= List of New Zealand military personnel =

The following is a list of notable New Zealand people associated with the military, including those who participated in warfare or saw active service in New Zealand.

== Musket Wars ==
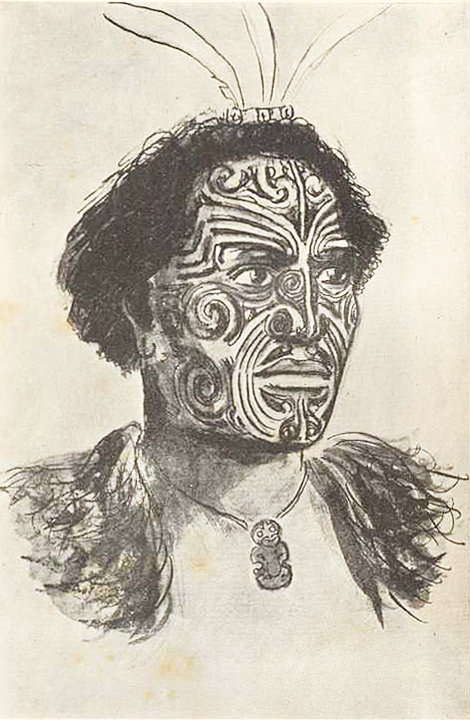
Hongi Hika - a sketch of an 1820 painting

- Hone Heke - Nga Puhi tribal chief and war leader
- Hongi Hika - Nga Puhi tribal chief and war leader
- Te Pēhi Kupe
- Te Rangihaeata
- Te Rauparaha
- Tītore - Nga Puhi tribal chief; led war parties to the East Cape in 1820 and 1821 and participated in the Girls' War

== New Zealand Wars ==
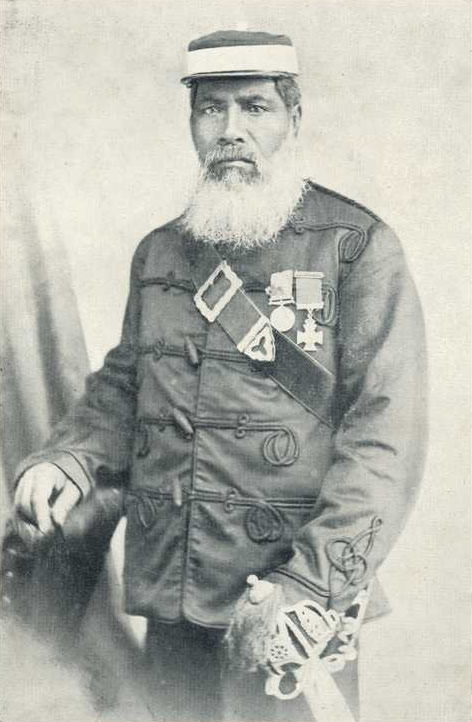
Major Ropata Wahawaha

- Samuel Austin - recipient of the New Zealand Cross
- Duncan Alexander Cameron - Commander of British forces during part of the New Zealand Wars
- George Jackson Carey
- Robert Carey - Commander of British forces at the Battle of Ōrākau
- Trevor Chute - Commander of British forces during part of the New Zealand Wars
- Thomas Bernard Collinson - Corps of Royal Engineers, Board of Ordnance, New Zealand, 1846–1850. Hosey's Battle, Whanganui, 1847
- Robert FitzRoy - Captain in Her Majesty’s Royal Navy, Governor and Commander in Chief in and over the Colony of New Zealand, Vice-Admiral of New Zealand, 1843-1845, Colonel of the Auckland Battalion of Militia, 1845. Flagstaff War, 1845
- Charles Emilius Gold - Commander of British forces during the early stages of the First Taranaki War, part of the New Zealand Wars
- Charles Heaphy - recipient of the Victoria Cross, awarded for his actions during an engagement in the Invasion of the Waikato; a surveyor and explorer prior to the New Zealand Wars, he was later a Member of Parliament
- William Magee Hunter (1834-1868)
- Tāmati Wāka Nene - Māori rangatira (chief) of the Ngāpuhi iwi. British ally, Flagstaff War, 1845–1846
- Marmaduke Nixon - officer in the militia during the Invasion of the Waikato; killed in action at Rangiaowhia
- William Odgers VC - first man to win the Victoria Cross in the New Zealand land wars
- Thomas Simson Pratt - British commander in the First Taranaki War
- George Preece - officer in the Armed Constabulary during the later stages of the New Zealand Wars and recipient of the New Zealand Cross
- Kepa Te Rangihiwinui - Maori leader on British side in the Taranaki Wars
- Beauchamp Seymour, 1st Baron Alcester - British naval commander in New Zealand, 1860-1861
- Te Kooti - the founder of the Ringatū religion and guerrilla fighter during the later stages of the New Zealand Wars
- Tītokowaru - Ngāti Ruanui tribal chief and war leader during the later stages of the New Zealand Wars
- Ropata Wahawaha - Ngāti Porou tribal chief who fought on the British side during the later stages of the New Zealand Wars

== Boer War ==
- Edward Chaytor - commanded the Second and Eighth Contingents sent to South Africa; commanded the ANZAC Mounted Division during World War I and was Commandant of the New Zealand Military Forces, from 1919 to 1924
- Janet Gillies, nurse
- William James Hardham - awarded Victoria Cross, later served in World War I
- John Gethin Hughes - soldier in the First Contingent sent to South Africa and first New Zealand recipient of the Distinguished Service Order; later commanded an infantry battalion at Gallipoli during World War I
- James O'Sullivan - defence storekeeper at the time of Boer War
- Alfred William Robin - commanded the First Contingent sent to South Africa; later Commandant of the New Zealand Military Forces, from 1914 to 1919

== World War I ==
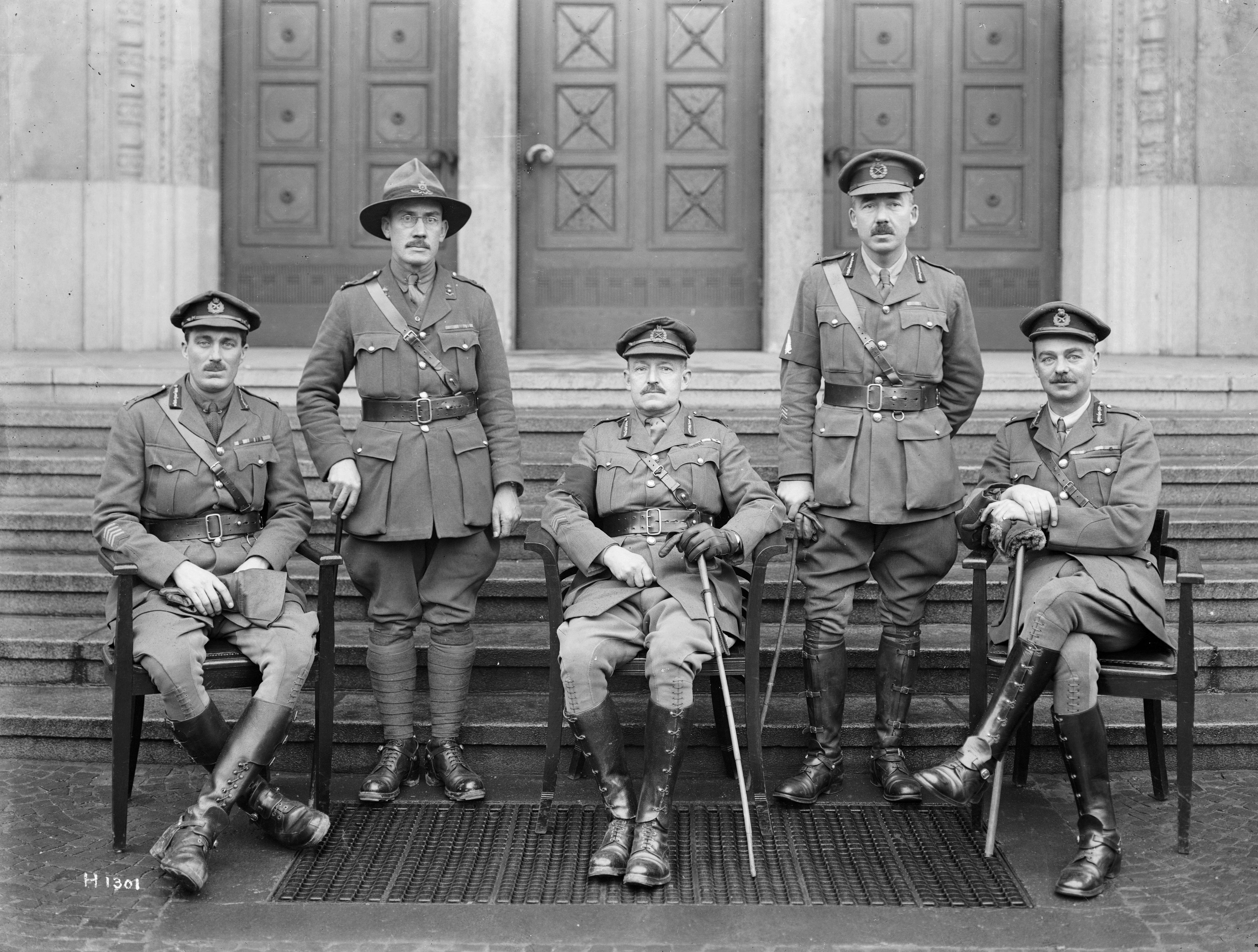
Major-General Andrew Russell, centre front, in 1919 with some of the senior officers of the New Zealand Division, including Brigadier-General Herbert Hart (front left) and Brigadier-General Charles Melvill (front right)

- Leslie Cecil Lloyd Averill - Platoon Commander and first New Zealander to scale the walls of Le Quesnoy
- Ronald Bannerman - World War I fighter ace
- Cyril Bassett - first soldier of the New Zealand Expeditionary Force to receive the Victoria Cross, awarded for his actions during the Battle of Chunuk Bair at Gallipoli, in August 1915
- Arthur Bauchop - commander of the Otago Mounted Rifles
- Harold Beamish - fighter ace with No. 3 Squadron Royal Naval Air Service
- William Thomas Beck - first New Zealand soldier ashore at Gallipoli
- Charles Mackie Begg - medical officer who served at Gallipoli and on the Western Front
- Charles Henry Brown - officer who served at Gallipoli and commanded an infantry brigade on the Western Front; killed in action during the Battle of Messines in 1917
- Donald Forrester Brown - posthumous recipient of the Victoria Cross, the first such award to a soldier of the New Zealand Expeditionary Force serving on the Western Front
- Keith Caldwell - fighter ace and commander of the Royal Flying Corps' No. 74 Squadron; later a senior officer in the Royal New Zealand Air Force during World War II and the postwar period
- Thomas Culling - first New Zealand fighter ace of World War I
- James Lloyd Findlay - soldier and fighter pilot
- Nora FitzGibbon - nurse
- Harry Fulton - senior officer who commanded an infantry brigade on the Western Front; killed in action in 1918
- Herbert Ernest Hart - senior officer who served at Gallipoli and commanded an infantry brigade on the Western Front; later administrator of Western Samoa
- Francis Earl Johnston - senior officer who commanded an infantry brigade at Gallipoli and on the Western Front; killed in action in 1917
- George Napier Johnston - Commander Royal Artillery of the New Zealand Division
- George Augustus King - officer who served at Gallipoli and on the Western Front; killed in action during the Battle of Passchendaele in 1917
- Norman Joseph Levien - Ordnance Officer Egypt, Gallipoli, France and United Kingdom
- William George Malone - Commander of the Wellington Infantry Battalion, killed in action at Gallipoli
- Thomas James McCristell - officer in charge of the Ordnance Corps in New Zealand
- Charles Melvill - senior officer who commanded an infantry brigade on the Western Front; later Commandant of New Zealand Military Forces, from 1924 to 1925
- Arthur Plugge - officer who served at Gallipoli and on the Western Front
- Andrew Hamilton Russell - Commander of the New Zealand Division
- William Sinclair-Burgess - New Zealand officer serving with Australian forces
- James Waddell - New Zealand soldier serving with the French Foreign Legion
- Bright Williams - last surviving New Zealand Soldier of the First World War
- Robert Young - senior officer who commanded an infantry brigade on the Western Front; later Commandant of New Zealand Military Forces, from 1925 to 1931

== World War II ==
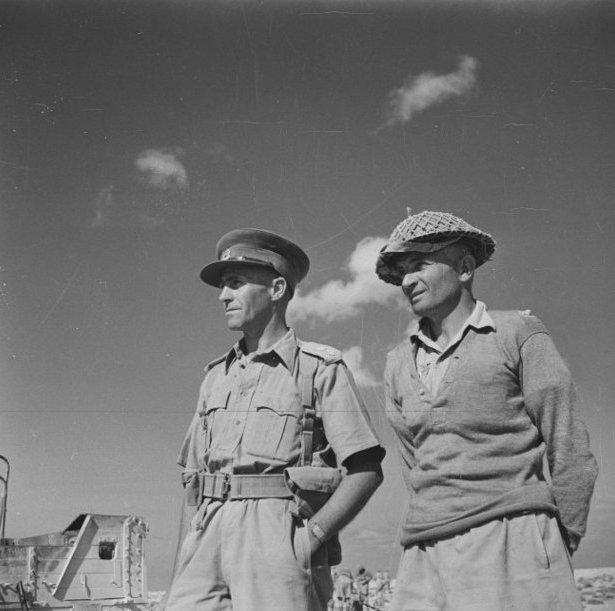
The then Brigadier Howard Karl "Kip" Kippenberger, on the left, with double Victoria Cross recipient Captain Charles Upham

(some served also in World War I)

- Russell Aitken - pilot in the Royal Air Force who pioneered the use of amphibian aircraft for rescuing downed British pilots during the Battle of Britain
- Leslie Andrew - senior officer who served with the 2NZEF in Greece, Crete, and North Africa; also a Victoria Cross recipient of World War I
- Fred Baker - Commander, 28th Maori Battalion
- Fraser Barron - bomber pilot with the Royal New Zealand Air Force; served with Bomber Command and one of only four personnel of the RNZAF to be awarded the Distinguished Service Order twice
- Harold Eric Barrowclough - Commander, 3rd New Zealand Division
- Minden Blake - fighter pilot and flying ace with the Royal Air Force
- Stanley Browne - fighter pilot and flying ace with the Royal New Zealand Air Force
- Maurice Buckley - bomber pilot commander of No. 75 Squadron
- Brian Carbury - fighter pilot and flying ace with the Royal Air Force
- Sir Roderick Carr - RAF Bomber Command and Chief of the Indian Air Force
- Johnny Checketts - fighter pilot and flying ace with the Royal New Zealand Air Force; commanded No. 485 Squadron RNZAF for a period in 1943
- George Herbert Clifton - senior officer who served with the 2NZEF in Greece and North Africa
- Wilfred Clouston - fighter pilot and flying ace with the Royal Air Force; commanded fighter squadrons during the course of World War II
- Basil Collyns - fighter pilot and flying ace with the Royal Air Force
- Sir Arthur Coningham - RAF Second Tactical Air Force commander
- Bill Crawford-Crompton - fighter pilot and flying ace with the Royal Air Force; commanded several squadrons and fighter wings during the course of World War II
- William Cunningham - Commandant of the Fiji Defence Force
- Dan Davin - 2NZEF officer and author of war history
- Alan Deere - fighter pilot and flying ace with the Royal Air Force
- Antonio Dini - fighter pilot and flying ace with the Royal Air Force
- John Dinsdale - Coastal Command pilot and commander of No. 489 Squadron
- John Evelyn Duigan - Chief of General Staff, New Zealand Military Forces, from 1937 to 1941
- Owen Eagleson - fighter pilot and flying ace with the Royal New Zealand Air Force
- Keith Elliott - soldier and recipient of the Victoria Cross
- Mick Ensor - Coastal Command pilot with the Royal New Zealand Air Force, later serving in the Royal Air Force
- Geoffrey Bryson Fisken - RNZAF fighter ace, initially on Brewster Buffalo
- Mick Ensor - high decorated Coastal Command pilot of the Royal New Zealand Air Force, later served in the Royal Air Force
- Trevor Freeman - bomber and fighter pilot with the Royal New Zealand Air Force
- Baron Freyberg of Wellington - Commander, 2NZEF and 2nd New Zealand Division; later Governor-General of New Zealand
- Colin Falkland Gray - fighter pilot and flying ace with the Royal Air Force; commanded several squadrons and fighter wings during the course of World War II
- James Hayter - fighter pilot and flying ace with the Royal Air Force
- Gilbert Hayton - fighter pilot and flying ace with the Royal Air Force
- Michael Herrick - fighter pilot and flying ace with the Royal Air Force; commanded No. 15 Squadron RNZAF for a period in 1943
- Jack Hinton - soldier and recipient of the Victoria Cross
- Thomas W. Horton - Commander of No 105 RAF Pathfinder squadron
- Clive Hulme - soldier and recipient of the Victoria Cross
- Reginald Hyde - fighter pilot and flying ace with the Royal Air Force
- Ivon Julian - fighter pilot and flying ace with the Royal New Zealand Air Force
- Lindsay Merritt Inglis - senior officer who served with the 2NZEF in Greece, Crete, North Africa and Italy
- Edgar James "Cobber" Kain - fighter pilot and flying ace with the Royal Air Force; the first pilot to win a Distinguished Flying Cross in World War II
- Thomas Joseph King - DADOS HQ 2nd New Zealand Division
- Howard Karl "Kip" Kippenberger - Commander, 2nd New Zealand Division
- John Noble MacKenzie - fighter pilot and flying ace with the Royal Air Force
- Haane Manahi - soldier and recipient of the Distinguished Conduct Medal
- Owen Mead - senior officer who served with the 2NZEF and the highest ranking soldier of the New Zealand Military Forces to be killed on active service
- Reginald Miles - senior officer who served with the 2NZEF in Greece and North Africa
- Harold North - fighter pilot and flying ace with the Royal Air Force
- Sir Keith Park - No. 11 Group RAF commander during the Battle of Britain; later commanded in Malta and Southeast Asia
- Nigel Park - fighter pilot and flying ace with the Royal New Zealand Air Force; nephew of Sir Keith Park
- Graham Beresford Parkinson - senior officer who served with the 2NZEF in Greece, North Africa and Italy
- John Pattison - fighter pilot with the Royal Air Force; later transferred to the Royal New Zealand Air Force and commanded No. 485 Squadron RNZAF for a period in 1944–45
- Sir Peter Phipps - founding Chief of Defence Staff
- Edward Puttick - senior officer who served with the 2NZEF in Greece and Crete; later Chief of General Staff, New Zealand Military Forces, from 1941 to 1945
- Raymond Queree - senior officer who served with the 2NZEF in Greece, North Africa and Italy
- Paul Rabone - fighter pilot and flying ace with the Royal Air Force
- Jack Rae - fighter pilot and flying ace with the Royal New Zealand Air Force
- Robert Row - senior officer who served with the 2NZEF in Greece and in the Pacific; commanded 8th Brigade during the Battle of the Treasury Islands
- Warren Schrader - fighter pilot and flying ace with the Royal New Zealand Air Force
- Desmond J. Scott - fighter pilot and flying ace with the Royal New Zealand Air Force
- Gage Sise - Coastal Command pilot
- Irving Smith - fighter pilot and flying ace with the Royal New Zealand Air Force; later served with the Royal Air Force in the postwar period
- Robert Spurdle - fighter pilot and flying ace with the Royal Air Force
- Gray Stenborg - fighter pilot and flying ace with the Royal New Zealand Air Force
- William George Stevens - senior officer who served with the 2NZEF
- Keith Lindsay Stewart - senior officer who served with the 2NZEF in Greece, Crete and Italy; later Chief of General Staff, New Zealand Military Forces, from 1949 to 1952
- Donald Stott - soldier in the 2NZEF, later served in Special Operations Executive and Z Special Unit
- Ernest Tacon - Coastal Command pilot and later commander in the King's Flight
- Leonard Trent - pilot and recipient of the Victoria Cross
- Lloyd Alan Trigg - pilot and recipient of the Victoria Cross; only person so awarded solely on recommendation of the enemy
- Charles Upham - soldier of 20th Battalion and two-time recipient of the Victoria Cross
- Nancy Wake - most decorated servicewoman of World War II
- Sidney Wallingford - senior officer of the Royal New Zealand Air Force
- Derek Harland Ward - fighter pilot and flying ace with the Royal Air Force
- James Allen Ward - bomber pilot with the Royal New Zealand Air Force, 75 Squadron RNZAF; recipient of the Victoria Cross
- Norman Weir - senior officer who served with the 2NZEF; later Chief of General Staff, New Zealand Military Forces, from 1946 to 1949
- Edward Wells - fighter pilot and flying ace with the Royal Air Force
- Bert Wipiti - fighter pilot with the Royal New Zealand Air Force

== Post-WWII ==
- Denis Barnett - Commander, British Forces Cyprus
- Richard Bolt - bomber pilot with the Royal New Zealand Air Force during World War II; later Chief of the Air Staff from 1974 to 1976 and then Chief of the Defence Staff from 1976 to 1980
- Malcolm Calder - Chief of the Air Staff from 1958 to 1962
- Sir William Gentry - officer who served with the 2NZEF during World War II; later Chief of General Staff, New Zealand Army, from 1952 to 1955
- Ronald Hassett - officer who served with the 2NZEF during World War II and with Kayforce in the Korean War; later Chief of General Staff, New Zealand Army, from 1976 to 1978
- Walter McKinnon - officer who served with the 2NZEF during World War II; later Chief of General Staff, New Zealand Army, from 1965 to 1967
- Ian Morrison - bomber pilot with the Royal New Zealand Air Force during World War II; later Chief of the Air Staff from 1962 to 1966
- Melissa Ross - senior officer in the Royal New Zealand Navy
- Douglas St George - fighter pilot with the Royal New Zealand Air Force during World War II; later Chief of the Air Staff from 1971 to 1974
- William Stratton - fighter pilot with the Royal New Zealand Air Force during World War II; later Chief of the Air Staff from 1969 to 1971

== See also ==
- List of World War II aces from New Zealand
- Military history of New Zealand
- New Zealand Defence Force#Previous Chiefs
