= Thomas W. Horton (RAF officer) =

New Zealand pilot (1919–2021)

Thomas Welch Horton
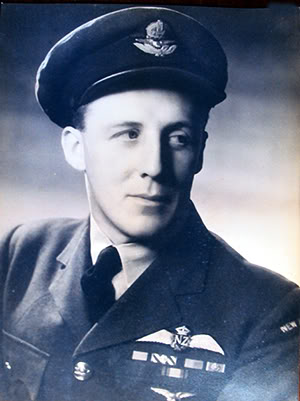
- Horton in 1945
- Born: 29 December 1919; Masterton, New Zealand
- Died: 6 December 2021 (aged 101); Florida, U.S.
- Military career
- Allegiance: New Zealand; United Kingdom
- Branch: Royal New Zealand Air Force (1939–47); Royal Air Force (1947–66)
- Service years: 1939–1966
- Rank: Wing Commander
- Service number: 39920 (RNZAF); 59071 (RAF)
- Commands: No. 105 Squadron RAF; No. 203 Squadron RAF
- Conflicts: Second World War
- Awards: Distinguished Service Order; Distinguished Flying Cross & Bar

Thomas Welch Horton, DSO, DFC & Bar (29 December 1919 – 6 December 2021) was a Royal New Zealand Air Force (RNZAF) officer, pilot, and combat veteran who served with the Royal Air Force (RAF) in a number of significant engagements during the Second World War. He was a member of No. 88 Squadron and flew anti-ship missions in the Bristol Blenheim and Douglas Boston. Horton also served with and later commanded No. 105 Squadron flying the de Havilland Mosquito in the Pathfinder Force (PFF) that marked targets for destruction by following groups of heavy bombers.

After the war, Horton was commissioned with the RAF and commanded No. 203 Squadron, flying maritime patrol missions in the Neptune MR.1. He served on the United Kingdom's Air Ministry staff and as a liaison officer in the Pentagon to the North Atlantic Treaty Organization (NATO). Horton retired with the rank of wing commander in 1966.

== Early years ==
Horton was born on 29 December 1919 in Masterton, New Zealand, the only child of Constance Welch and Thomas Hector 'Bill' Horton. He grew up in Masterton and attended Wairarapa High School. Horton learned to fly in a de Havilland Gipsy Moth biplane at the Wairarapa & Ruahine Aero Club where he was selected in July 1937 for training as part of the civil reserve of pilots. He worked in a law office before joining the Royal New Zealand Air Force on 26 October 1939.

== Air Force career ==
=== No. 88 Squadron ===
Horton received additional flight training at Blenheim, in the Vickers Vildebeest, and then headed to England at the end of April 1940 aboard the SS Mataroa. At RAF Benson, he trained in the Fairey Battle light bomber and was assigned to No. 88 Squadron RAF where he flew anti-ship patrols from RAF Sydenham in Northern Ireland. The squadron moved to RAF Swanton Morley in July 1941 where Horton transitioned to the Bristol Blenheim and flew more anti-ship patrols.

The devotion of the attacks on Rotterdam ... are beyond all praise.

— Winston Churchill, Message to the surviving aircrews

In 1942, Flight Lieutenant Horton was awarded the Distinguished Flying Cross for his skill and bravery on anti-ship missions including the hazardous low-level attack on shipping at Rotterdam on 28 August 1941. On at least three missions, he successfully returned to base after one of his aircraft's engines had been disabled by anti-aircraft fire.

Horton transitioned to the Douglas Boston and flew more anti-ship strikes from RAF Attlebridge northwest of Norwich, Norfolk, England. He participated in a number of Circus missions in which RAF bombers, escorted by friendly fighters, were used to draw out Luftwaffe fighters to their destruction. After completing his first combat tour, Horton spent a year as an instructor teaching instrument flying.

=== Pathfinder Force ===
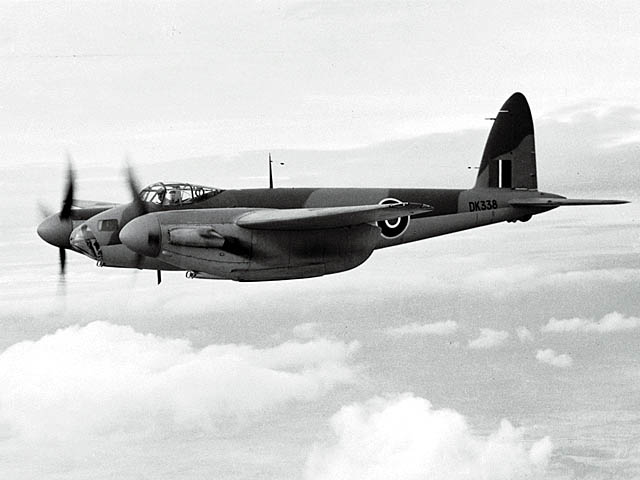
Mosquito B Mk IV serial DK338 before delivery to 105 Squadron

In July 1943, Horton was assigned to No. 105 Squadron RAF where he flew the de Havilland Mosquito light bomber from RAF Marham in Norfolk as part of the Pathfinder Force (PFF). The Pathfinders specialized in locating and marking targets with flares thereby improving the accuracy of the following main bomber force. No. 105 Squadron was part of the No. 8 (Pathfinder Force) Group. For Horton, this meant a change from low-level daylight to high altitude nighttime missions.

The squadron utilized precision navigation aids such as the "Oboe" system that allowed the Pathfinders to accurately mark targets despite the industrial haze and cloud cover that obscured the area by night. Horton also dropped bombs, including the 4,000-pound (1,800 kg) "cookie", from his Mosquito. He participated in the Battle of the Ruhr in 1943 and protected the Normandy landings in 1944. In 1944, Squadron Leader Horton was awarded a Bar to his Distinguished Flying Cross for demonstrating "great courage and determination" on his missions with No. 105 Squadron. In June of the following year, he took command of the squadron. On 21 September 1945, Wing Commander Horton received the Distinguished Service Order. The citation recognized his "sound judgement and fine leadership as a flight commander". FlightGlobal included Horton in their 1945 photo presentation of Pathfinder leaders.

Horton completed his World War II service with 111 sorties, 84 of them with the Pathfinders, and returned to New Zealand in 1946. He separated from the RNZAF on 10 April 1947.

=== RAF career ===
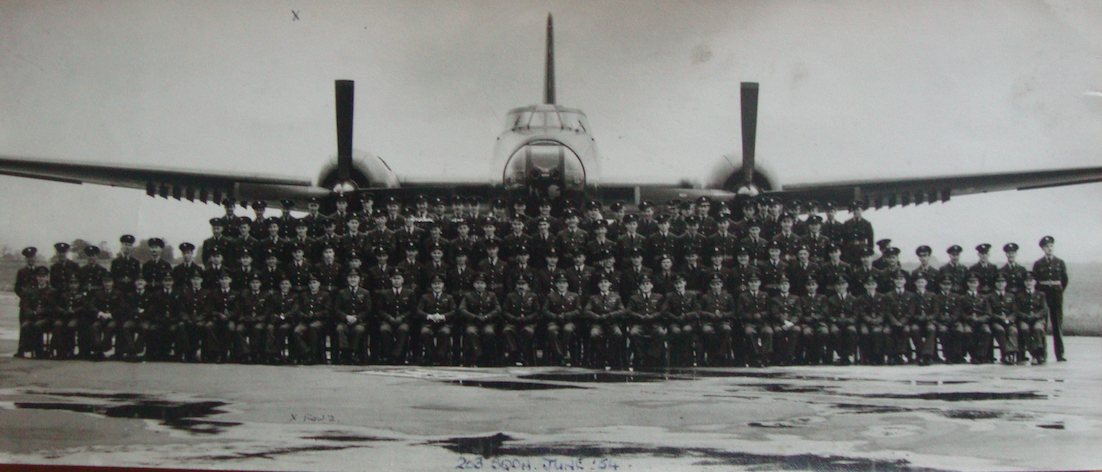
No 203 Squadron RAF in 1954

The United Kingdom's Air Ministry offered Horton an appointment to a permanent commission with seniority for his wartime service if he would accept a position with the Royal Air Force. Horton left New Zealand and returned to England in late 1947 where he began his RAF service on 1 January 1948. After several staff appointments, including the Air Ministry in London and RAF Coastal Command headquarters, Horton took command of No. 203 Squadron RAF from December 1952 to January 1955. The squadron relocated in late 1952 to RAF Topcliffe and re-equipped with the Neptune MR.1 to perform North Atlantic Ocean maritime and anti-submarine patrols during the Cold War with the Eastern Bloc (the Soviet Union and its satellite states).

In 1955, Horton returned to the Air Ministry and served with the department of the Chief of the Air Staff. Horton was promoted to RAF wing commander in 1956 and in 1964 was assigned to the staff of the North Atlantic Treaty Organization (NATO) Military Committee at the Pentagon in the United States. From 1959 to 1960, Horton served in a dual capacity as senior air staff officer at RAF Gibraltar and British air attaché to Rabat, Morocco. Horton retired from the RAF with the rank of wing commander on 29 December 1966 with a total of 27 years of military service.

== Honours ==
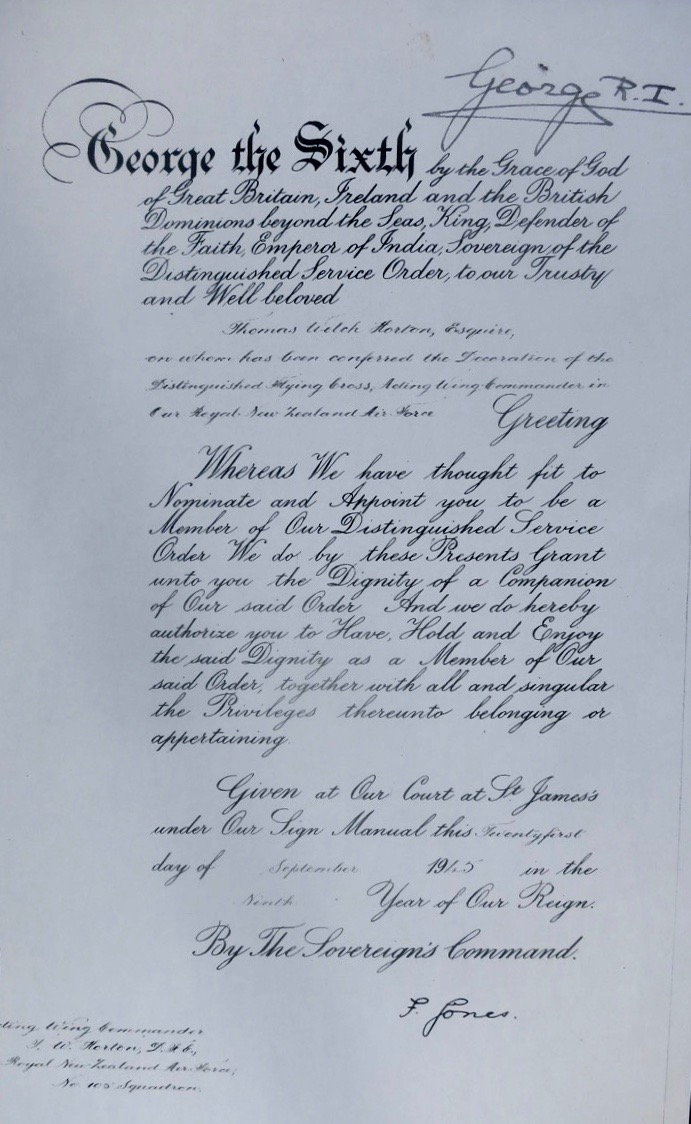
DSO certificate presented by George VI

Horton was awarded the Distinguished Flying Cross in 1942, and a Bar to his DFC in 1944. In 1945, he was awarded the Distinguished Service Order. King George VI formally presented Horton with this honour at an investiture ceremony at the Court of St James's on 21 September 1945. For his service, Horton received the following campaign and commemorative medals: 1939–1945 Star, Air Crew Europe Star, Defence Medal, War Medal 1939–1945, Queen Elizabeth II Coronation Medal, and the New Zealand War Service Medal.

In 2013, Horton was recognized for his contributions by Mike Moore, New Zealand's ambassador to the United States, during the 98th anniversary Anzac Day. Horton met with Mr. and Mrs. Moore again in 2014 at the 99th anniversary of Anzac Day.

== Personal life ==
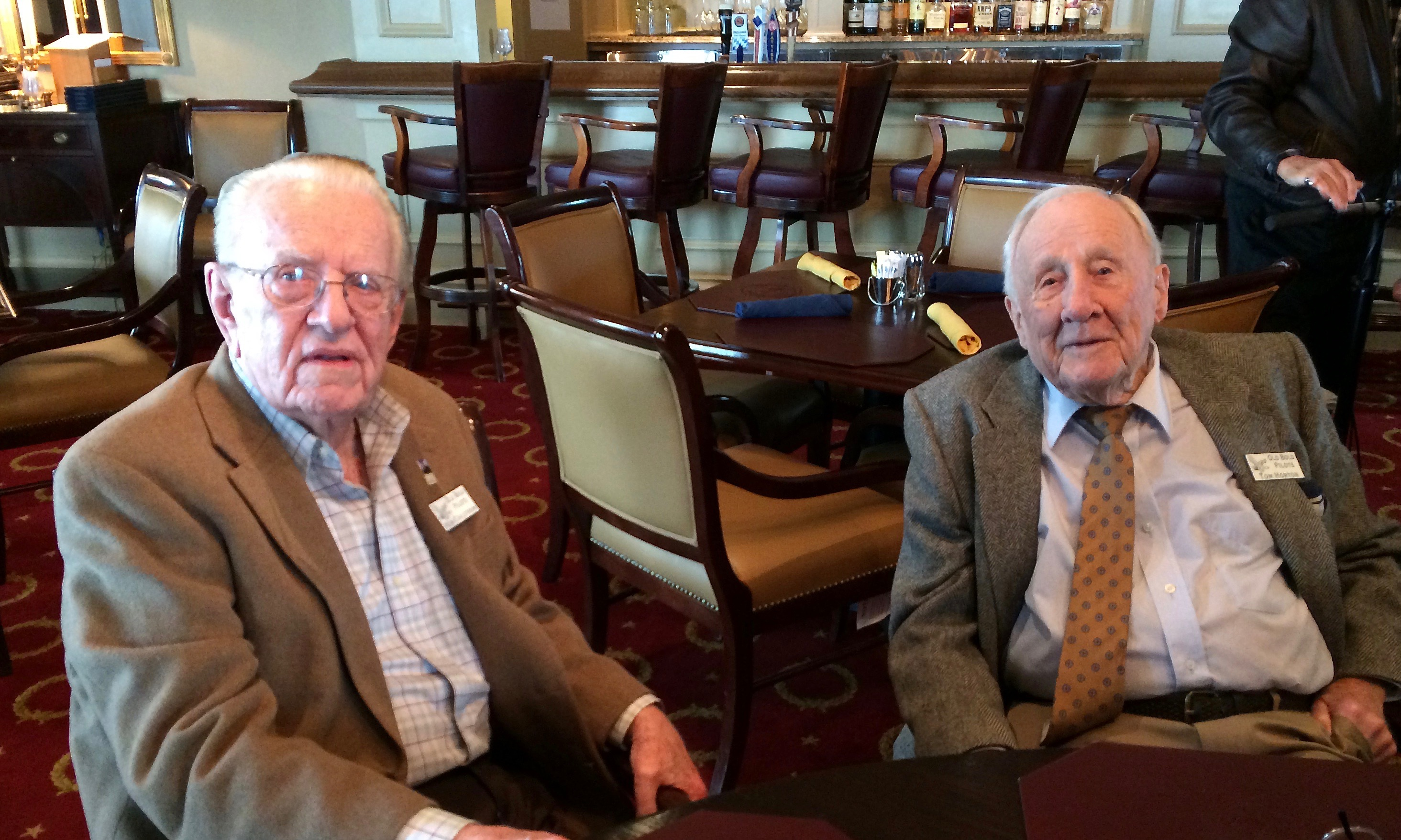
Second World War aviators Ken Chilstrom and Tom Horton at an OBPA luncheon in 2014

Horton married in December 1943 and had one daughter, Gail, and one son, Peter. His wife of 68 years, Beris, died in October 2011. Horton remained interested in aviation and attended luncheons with fellow pilots. During a 2012 interview, he expressed a desire to visit a restored de Havilland Mosquito at the nearby Military Aviation Museum, but age had made travel increasingly difficult for him.

As of 2019, Horton resided with his daughter in Naples, Florida in the United States. Horton died in Florida on 6 December 2021, at the age of 101.

== See also ==
- Hughie Edwards – Fellow commander and pilot with No. 105 Squadron RAF
- John Wooldridge – Fellow commander and pilot with No. 105 Squadron RAF
- List of New Zealand military personnel
- RAF Bomber Command aircrew of World War II
