= Fred Ascani =

United States Air Force general

Fred J. Ascani
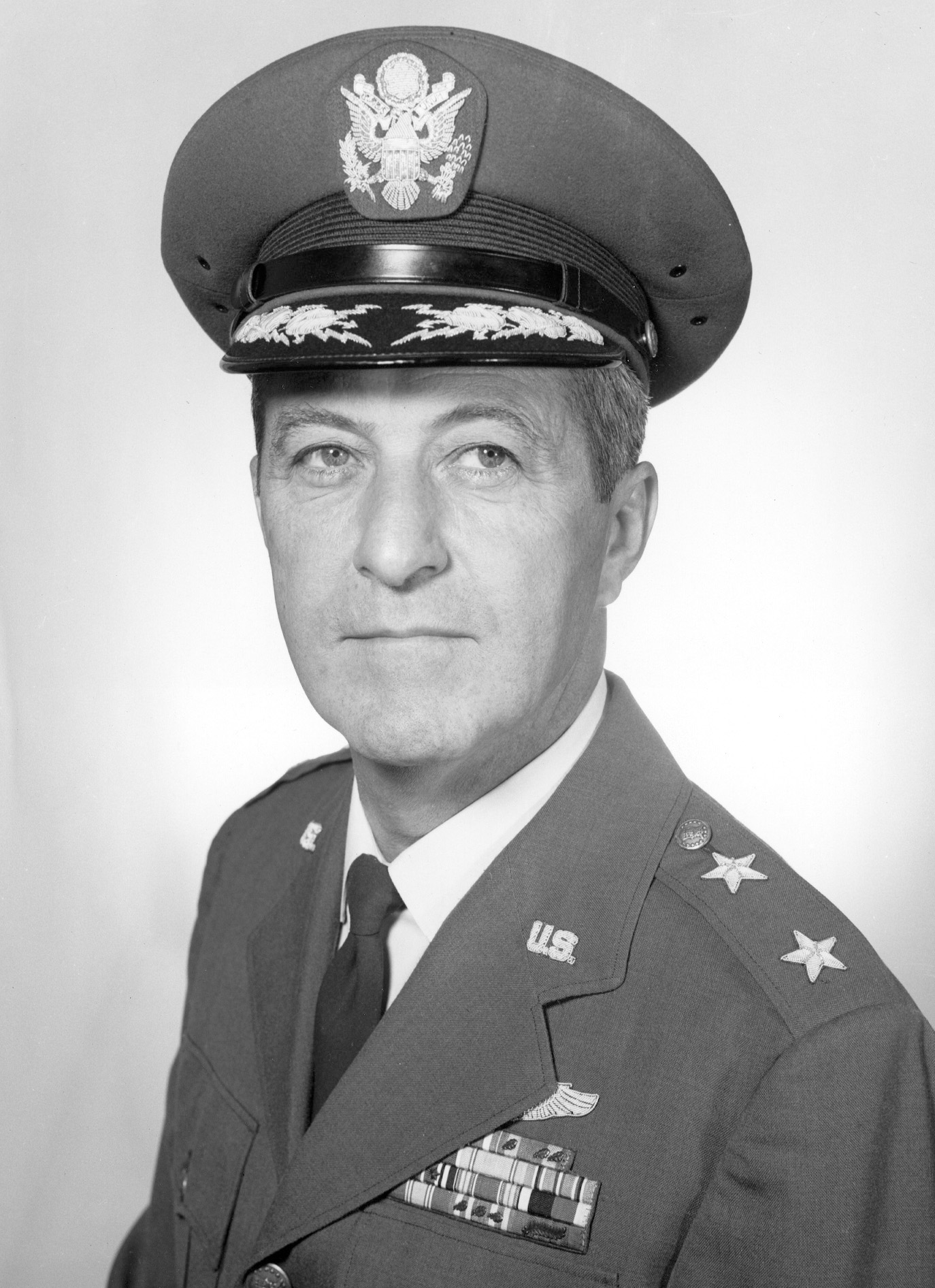
- Born: May 29, 1917; Beloit, Wisconsin, U.S.
- Died: March 28, 2010 (aged 92); Alexandria, Virginia, U.S.
- Military career
- Allegiance: United States of America
- Branch: United States Air Force
- Service years: 1937–1973 (32 yrs)
- Rank: Major general
- Nickname: Fred
- Commands: Vice commander, Fifth Air Force, 1965–67; WP AFB Systems Eng. Group, 1964–65; 50th Fighter Bomber Wing, 1955–57; 86th Fighter Interceptor Group, 1954; Vice commander, AFFTC, 1951–53; 816th Bombardment Squadron, 1944; 815th Bombardment Squadron, 1943
- Conflicts: World War II
- Awards: Air Force Distinguished Service Medal; Legion of Merit, 1 OLC; Distinguished Flying Cross, 1 OLC; Air Medal, 4 OLCs; Army Commendation Medal, 1 OLC; Croix de Guerre with palm

Fred J. Ascani (born Alfredo John Ascani; May 29, 1917 – March 28, 2010) was an American major general and test pilot of the United States Air Force. He was one of the "Men of Mach 1" and was considered the father of systems engineering at Wright Field.

== Early years ==
Ascani was born on May 29, 1917, in Beloit, Wisconsin, to Italian immigrants just 14 years after the Wright brothers achieved powered flight. His interest in aviation was sparked in 1927 when he watched Charles Lindbergh fly overhead in the Spirit of St. Louis on his historic flight to Paris. His family moved to Rockford, Illinois, several miles downriver from Beloit, where Ascani attended Rockford High School and enjoyed a hobby building model airplanes. He graduated as high school valedictorian in 1935 and attended Beloit College for two years. In 1937, Ascani was accepted at the United States Military Academy at West Point, New York. He graduated 34th out of a class of 425 and in 1941 was commissioned a second lieutenant in the Army Corps of Engineers. Engineering took a back seat to aviation when Ascani was sent to Hicks Field for initial flight training and Foster Army Air Field for advanced flight training.

== World War II ==
After the U.S. entered World War II, Ascani was assigned as an instructor and squadron commander of the Twin Engine Advanced Flying School in Columbus, Mississippi. Although he had hopes this assignment would be a stepping stone for a combat tour in fighters, Captain Ascani was instead sent to Hendricks Field in Florida, to transition to four-engine aircraft. In December 1943, he was placed in command of the 815th Bombardment Squadron of the 483rd Bomb Group. After additional training in the B-17 Flying Fortress, Major Ascani joined the 816th Bombardment Squadron as its commander. The 816th was based in Foggia, Italy, and Ascani flew 53 combat missions in the B-17, including a secret mission delivery of supplies in German-occupied Czechoslovakia to partisans and the evacuation of escaping Allied airmen. Two of his missions were to Ploiești, Romania, and one to Memmingen, Germany, where he lost his entire squadron flying at the rear on an unescorted mission after being attacked from behind by over 200 German fighters.

== Flight test ==
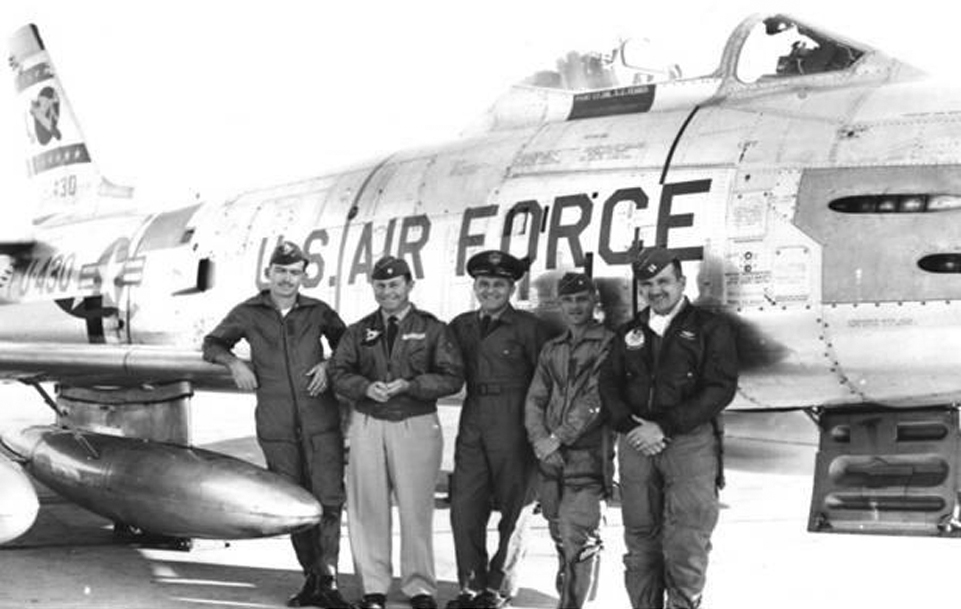
Members of the 50th Fighter Wing at Nellis in 1956. (left to right) Capt. Coleman Baker, Lt. Col. Chuck Yeager, Col. Fred Ascani, Maj. James Gasser and Capt. Robert Pasqualicchio

Upon his return to the U.S., Lt. Colonel Ascani was transferred to the Flight Test Division at Wright Field where he was assigned chief of the bomber test section. He attended the Flight Performance School (now the U.S. Air Force Test Pilot School) and graduated with class 46. In January 1946, Ascani met his new boss, Colonel Al Boyd, who would have a significant impact on both USAF flight test and Ascani's career. Boyd and Ascani worked well together, and Ascani became Boyd's deputy both at Wright Field and later at Edwards Air Force Base. One notable decision made by Boyd and Ascani was the pilot choice for who would first break the sound barrier. Although Ascani had initially recommended Major Ken Chilstrom, they eventually agreed that Chuck Yeager would pilot the Bell X-1, and Chilstrom would fly the performance, stability and control tests in the new XP-86. During his tour at Edwards AFB, Ascani flew a wide variety of research aircraft including the X-1, X-4, X-5, and the XF-92A. A highlight of his flying career occurred in 1951 when he flew an F-86E at the National Air Show in Detroit, Michigan, and established a new 100-kilometer closed course speed record of 635 mph. In September 1951, Colonel Ascani was named vice commander of the Air Force Flight Test Center at Edwards AFB.

In 1953, Ascani left flight test for a time. He studied for a year at the Air War College at Maxwell Air Force Base. After completing the coursework, Ascani was selected as the group commander of the 86th Fighter Interceptor Group based in Landstuhl, Germany. In June 1955, he was assigned as the wing commander of the 50th Fighter Bomber Wing, Hahn, Germany, and Toul-Rosières Air Base, France.

== Systems engineering ==
After completing his overseas tour, Ascani returned to Wright-Patterson AFB in 1957 as the Deputy Chief of Staff/Plans and Operations at the Wright Air Development Center (WADC). For many years, the USAF was under increasing pressure to reduce the time needed to convert new technologies into usable weapon systems. In May 1959, Ascani was one of twelve Colonels appointed to a committee, by the commander of the, then, Air Research and Development Command (ARDC), General Bernard Schriever, to resolve this issue. Ascani wrote a paper describing a systems engineering group that would be the interface between the laboratories and the product managers. Ascani's paper was the genesis of the committee's recommendations, which became known as the Maxwell Report, released in July 1959. Over the next four years, Wright Field science, engineering, and management capabilities were reorganized to comply with the details of the Report and the vision of General Schriever. Ascani played a key role in implementing the reorganization and was assigned as the first Director of Systems Engineering.

In April 1961, Ascani was assigned as deputy commander and system program director of the XB-70 Valkyrie project. Although only two were constructed, the sleek Mach 3 bomber pioneered technological advances used in later high speed aircraft such as the YF-12 and SR-71. Ascani's organizational skills were put to the test once again when, in 1962, he was appointed chairman of a task force to realign the Air Force Systems Command functions at Wright Field. The resulting structure of four laboratories and a systems engineering group has remained relatively unchanged to the present day. In 1964, Ascani was named commander of the Systems Engineering Group and deputy commander of the Research and Technology Division at Wright-Patterson AFB.

In 1965, Major General Ascani became vice commander of Fifth Air Force, Pacific Air Forces, with headquarters at Fuchu Air Station, Japan. He returned to Wright-Patterson in 1967 as director of operations for Air Force Logistics Command. In 1970, Ascani was named the senior Air Force member of the Weapon System Evaluation Group within the Office of Secretary of Defense. Ascani retired from active duty on August 1, 1973, after 32 years of service.

== Later years ==
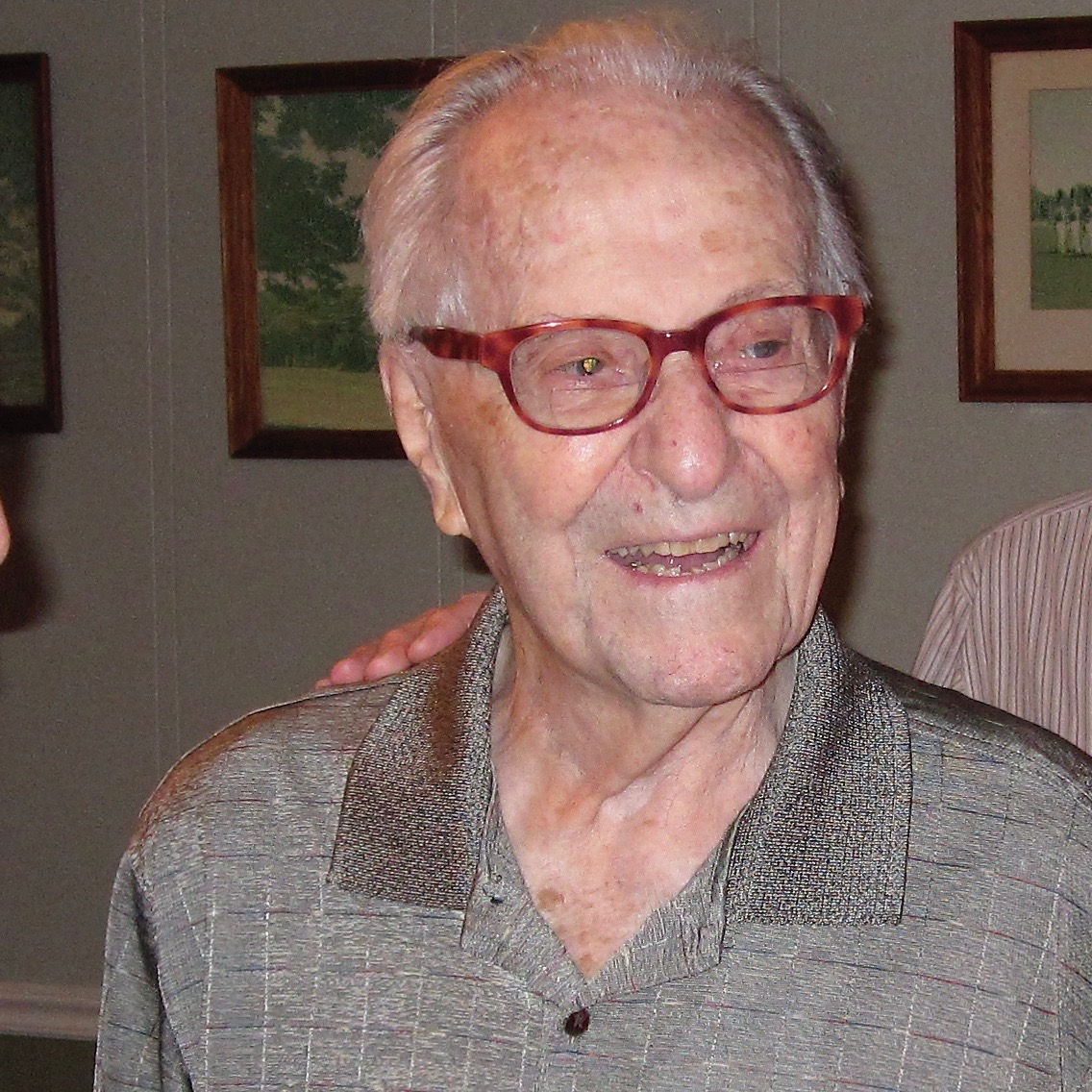
Fred Ascani at the Old Bold Pilots Association luncheon in August 2009

Ascani earned a Master of Science degree from the University of Southern California in 1971. From 1973 to 1981, he served as a USC adjunct professor teaching systems management organization in the Washington, D.C., area. He reached his "second retirement" in June 1981.

Ascani had lung cancer and died in his home in Alexandria, Virginia, on March 28, 2010. He is survived by his eight children: John Ascani, Bill Ascani, Carole Jo McDaniel, Susan Ascani, Stephen Ascani, Clare Ascani, Betsy Henderson and Dave Ascani. A Requiem was held at Good Shepherd Catholic Church in Alexandria. Ascani was interred with full military honors on June 3, 2010, at Arlington National Cemetery with his wife of 61 years, Catherine Ascani (1918–2003).

== Honors ==
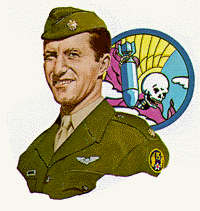
Fred Ascani's Gathering of Eagles 1992 Lithograph

Ascani's military decorations and awards include the Air Force Distinguished Service Medal, Legion of Merit with oak leaf cluster, Distinguished Flying Cross with oak leaf cluster, Air Medal with four oak leaf clusters, Army Commendation Medal with oak leaf cluster, and Croix de Guerre with palm (France). He is an Honorary Fellow of the Society of Experimental Test Pilots, a member of the Military Aviation Hall of Fame, and an honoree in the city of Lancaster's Aerospace Walk of Honor. In 1992, Ascani was honored as an Eagle in the Air Command and Staff College's Gathering of Eagles Program. Beloit College presented him with its Distinguished Service Citation/DSC Award. In recognition of his absolute speed record in the F-86, he was awarded in 1951 the Thompson Trophy, the Mackay Trophy, and the De la Vaulx Medal.

In June 2012, a street at Wright-Patterson Air Force Base was named after Ascani.

== Dates of promotion ==
The effective dates of Ascani's promotions are:

- Second Lieutenant, 1941
- First Lieutenant, not specified
- Captain, December 7, 1942
- Major, January 1944
- Lieutenant Colonel, November 6, 1944
- Colonel, January 19, 1951
- Brigadier General, July 1, 1961
- Major General, September 24, 1964
