= Kenneth O. Chilstrom =

American test pilot (1921–2022)

Kenneth Oscar Chilstrom
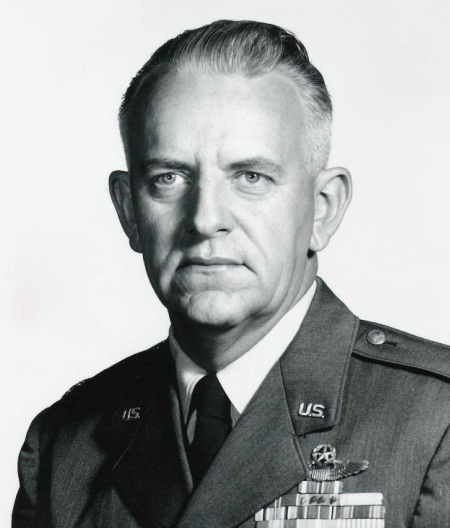
- Chilstrom in 1961
- Born: April 20, 1921; Zumbrota, Minnesota, U.S.
- Died: December 3, 2022 (aged 101); Fort Belvoir, Virginia, U.S.
- Burial place: Arlington National Cemetery
- Military career
- Allegiance: United States of America
- Branch: United States Air Force
- Service years: 1939–1964 (25 years)
- Rank: Colonel
- Nickname: K.O.
- Commands: Chief of Fighter Test, 1946–48; USAF Test Pilot School, 1949–50; F-108 Program Manager, 1958–59
- Conflicts: World War II; Cold War
- Awards: Distinguished Flying Cross; Air Medal
- Other work: Aerospace Industry; Author

Kenneth Oscar Chilstrom (April 20, 1921 – December 3, 2022) was a United States Air Force officer, combat veteran, test pilot, and author. He was the first USAF pilot to fly the XP-86 Sabre, chief of fighter test at Wright Field, commandant of the U.S. Air Force Test Pilot School, and program manager for the XF-108 Rapier. Chilstrom was a pilot in the first jet air race and delivered the first air mail by jet. He flew over eighty combat missions in the Italian Campaign of World War II and tested over twenty foreign models of German and Japanese fighters and bombers to evaluate their strengths and weaknesses.

== Early life ==
Chilstrom was born on April 20, 1921, in Zumbrota—a small town in the southeast part of Minnesota. He developed an interest in aviation at an early age and began building model airplanes while still in grade school in Chicago, Illinois. After graduating from high school in 1939, Chilstrom went to a military recruiting office to sign up for pilot training. Since he did not have the two years of college needed to enter the air cadet training program, Chilstrom enlisted in the United States Army Air Corps to train as an aircraft mechanic.

== Military career ==
Chilstrom completed the aircraft mechanics school at Chanute Field in Rantoul, Illinois, and eventually became an instructor. Still yearning to fly, he attended night school to earn the needed college credits. But the Army Air Corps now faced a shortage of pilots, and Chilstrom was accepted into the pilot training program anyway. In October 1942, he earned his wings and a second lieutenant's commission when he graduated with class 42I at Lake Charles, Louisiana. Chilstrom was assigned to the 58th Fighter Group at Bolling Field whose mission was to guard the nation's capital in Washington, D.C.

=== Combat in World War II ===
In February 1943, the 58th Fighter Group received new Curtiss P-40 Warhawks and took them to North Africa aboard the USS Ranger. Chilstrom and his fellow aviators arrived at an airfield near Casablanca shortly after the Allied defeat at Kasserine Pass. The 58th Fighter Group was forced to turn over their P-40s to a combat-experienced unit that lost their aircraft when German troops overran their airfield. Chilstrom transferred to the 27th Fighter Bomber Group and flew eighty missions in the North American A-36 over Sicily and Italy. At the end of his tour in November 1943, he returned home to the United States.

=== Flight test ===
Chilstrom strongly desired a position in flight test at Dayton, Ohio's Wright Field—the dream job of many fighter pilots. Although no flight test positions were open at the time, he was able to secure a position as maintenance officer for Major Chris Petrie, Chief of Fighter Test. Flight test at Wright Field expanded rapidly and provided Chilstrom with the opportunity to realize his dream. He tested a number of P-47 Thunderbolt variants including the XP-47E with a pressurized cockpit and the XP-47J—one of the fastest piston engine fighters ever built.

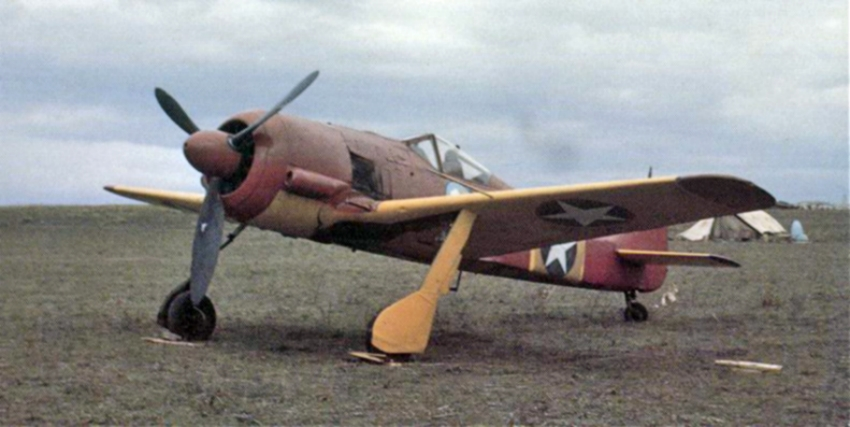
Captured Fw 190

During his seven years in flight test, Chilstrom flew 147 different aircraft including X, Y, and production models from the United States, Germany, and Japan. Many German and Japanese aircraft captured during World War II were sent to Wright Field, and Chilstrom had the opportunity to fly and evaluate over twenty different models including the Focke-Wulf Fw 190, the Messerschmitt Me 262, the A6M Zero, and the Kawasaki Ki-45 Nick. He flew the Fw 190 extensively and during his tenth flight on February 24, 1945, a malfunctioning trim switch nearly killed him. Chilstrom was landing at Wright Field when the elevator trim switch malfunctioned causing the nose to pitch up while the Fw 190 was dangerously close to the ground. After regaining control and climbing to a safe altitude, he identified the problem and determined the trim could also be driven to a full nose-down position. With full nose-down trim, Chilstrom had just enough control to successfully land the aircraft. Other Fw 190 pilots were not as fortunate as electrical problems in the trim switch caused or were suspected to have caused a number of crashes.

Chilstrom flew the United States' first twin jet engined fighter aircraft—the Bell P-59 Airacomet. In February 1945, while delivering a P-59 to Langley Field, he experienced an engine failure during take off that resulted in a runway excursion. Unable to stop or take off, Chilstrom crashed into a stand of trees just past the end of the runway. Although the P-59 was destroyed, Chilstrom survived one of the first major jet accidents in a U.S. military aircraft with only minor injuries.

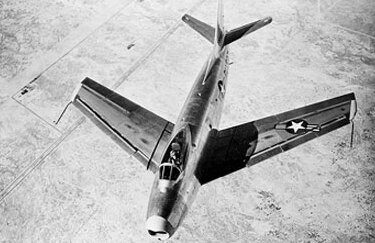
XP-86 in flight over the Mojave Desert in 1947

Chilstrom graduated in the first group, class 45, of the recently formed Flight Performance School (now known as the United States Air Force Test Pilot School) with his friend and roommate Glen Edwards, who would later become the namesake of Edwards Air Force Base. Chilstrom was highly regarded by his superiors and in September 1946 succeeded Gabby Gabreski as chief of the Fighter Test section. He was in charge of a very select group of pilots including Richard Bong, John T. Godfrey, Bob Hoover, Don Gentile, Steve Pisanos, and Chuck Yeager. In 1947, Lieutenant Colonel Fred Ascani, deputy of the Flight Test Division, recommended Chilstrom fly the Bell X-1 on the historic mission to break the sound barrier, but division commander Colonel Al Boyd wanted Chilstrom as project officer for the XP-86 Sabre. Chilstrom was the first Air Force officer to test the XP-86, and by December 1947 had completed the XP-86 Phase II performance, stability and control tests pushing the aircraft to 45,000 feet (14,000 m) and Mach number 0.9.

Between 1949 and 1950, Chilstrom was assigned as the commandant of the USAF Test Pilot School and commanded the last classes held at Wright Field. Following classes, 51A and later, were held at Edwards Air Force Base in California. In the summer of 1949 he took his wife to Hollywood and at Warner Bros. Studios he was the technical advisor on the movie Chain Lightning starring Humphrey Bogart, Raymond Massey, and Eleanor Parker. In 1950, Chilstrom was selected for a test pilot exchange tour with the United Kingdom's Royal Air Force. While at Farnborough Airfield and Boscombe Down, he flew twenty five different British aircraft in two months.

=== Aircraft development ===
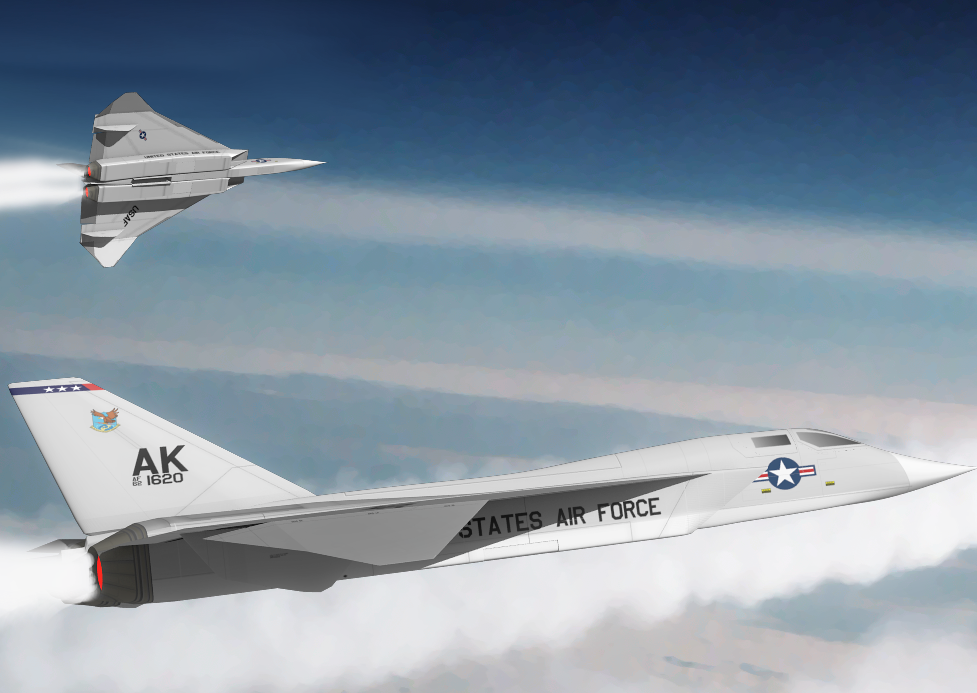
Artist's impression of two F-108s attached to Elmendorf AFB, Alaska

In 1950, Chilstrom reluctantly left flight test to work as the Fighter Requirements officer at headquarters, Far East Air Forces. He was then assigned to research and development at Air Force Headquarters on the F-100 Super Sabre, F-105 Thunderchief, and North American F-107 programs. In 1958, Chilstrom was promoted to Colonel and returned to Wright Field as the program manager for the F-108 Rapier, a long-range, high-speed interceptor aircraft. After the F-108 was cancelled on September 23, 1959, he supported the Lockheed YF-12 program. Chilstrom's last assignment was chief of program surveys at the headquarters of Air Force Systems Command at Andrews Air Force Base, Maryland. He retired from the Air Force in January 1964 after 25 years of service and worked in the aircraft industry for a number of companies including General Electric, Boeing-Vertol, Science Applications International Corporation, and Pratt & Whitney.

== Aviation firsts ==
In addition to being the first USAF pilot to test the XP-86, Chilstrom was involved in a number of aviation "firsts" including:

=== First jet air mail ===
To demonstrate the capabilities of the Army Air Corps, Chilstrom and fellow pilot Captain Robert Baird carried out the first transport of air mail by jet aircraft on June 22, 1946. Carrying a collection of mail that included a letter for Orville Wright, Chilstrom flew a P-80 Shooting Star from Schenectady County Airport in Schenectady, New York, to Dayton, Ohio. After stopping at Wright Field, he flew on to Chicago, Illinois, to complete the air mail delivery.

=== First jet air race ===
Chilstrom participated in the first "closed course" jet air race at the 1946 Cleveland National Air Races in Ohio. In this race, three P-80 Shooting Stars from Wright Field competed against three P-80s from the 1st Fighter Group at March Field, California. Chilstrom was forced out of the race due to mechanical problems when his aircraft's aileron boost failed. The Thompson trophy (Jet Division) was won by Major Gustav E. Lundquist of Wright Field, and Major Robin Olds of March Field took second place.

=== First USAF/USN pilot exchange program ===
In 1948, Chilstrom requested assignment in the first USAF exchange tour with the United States Navy. He trained at Naval Air Station Pensacola and checked out in the SNJ with six carrier landings on the USS Wright. Chilstrom was then assigned to Carrier Air Group Seven based at Naval Air Station Quonset Point, Rhode Island. After eighty Field Carrier Landing Practice (FCLP) touchdowns on shore, he completed fifty carrier landings in the F8F Bearcat aboard the USS Leyte.

== Later years ==
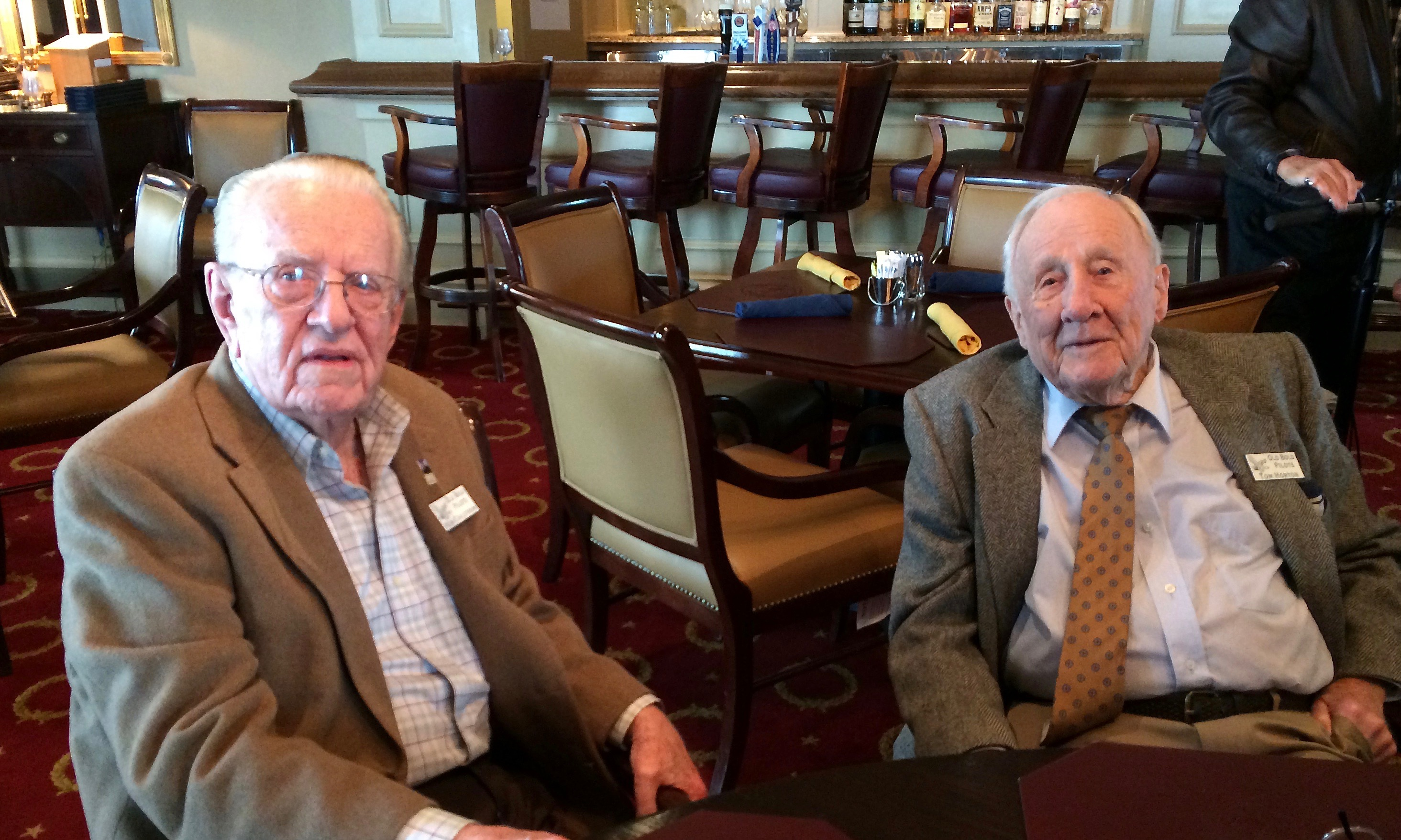
WWII aviators Ken Chilstrom and Tom Horton at an OBPA luncheon in 2014

In 1991, Chilstrom and fellow pilot Penn Leary documented the experiences of the "Wright Stuff" pilots and engineers in a book entitled, Test flying at Old Wright Field. A second edition was published in 1993 that included photographs and additional stories. Ruth, his wife of 57 years, died in May 2006 and is buried in Arlington National Cemetery. At the time of her death, Chilstrom has two sons, a daughter, and six grandchildren.

In 2016, Chilstrom traveled to Wright-Patterson AFB to attend the grand opening of a new building at the National Museum of the United States Air Force. The Albert Boyd and Fred Ascani Research and Development Gallery contains a collection of flight test aircraft flown by test pilots such as Chilstrom to help advance the state aerospace technology.

Chilstrom died in Fort Belvoir, Virginia, on December 3, 2022, at the age of 101. He was interred with his wife at Arlington National Cemetery in Section 66, Grave 272 on March 15, 2023.

== Honors ==
During his combat tour in World War II, Chilstrom earned the Distinguished Flying Cross, and the Air Medal with eight oak leaf clusters. In 2008, he was recognized in Air Force Magazine as a famous flyer of the F-86 Sabre.
