= Gray Stenborg =

New Zealand WWII flying ace (1921–1943)

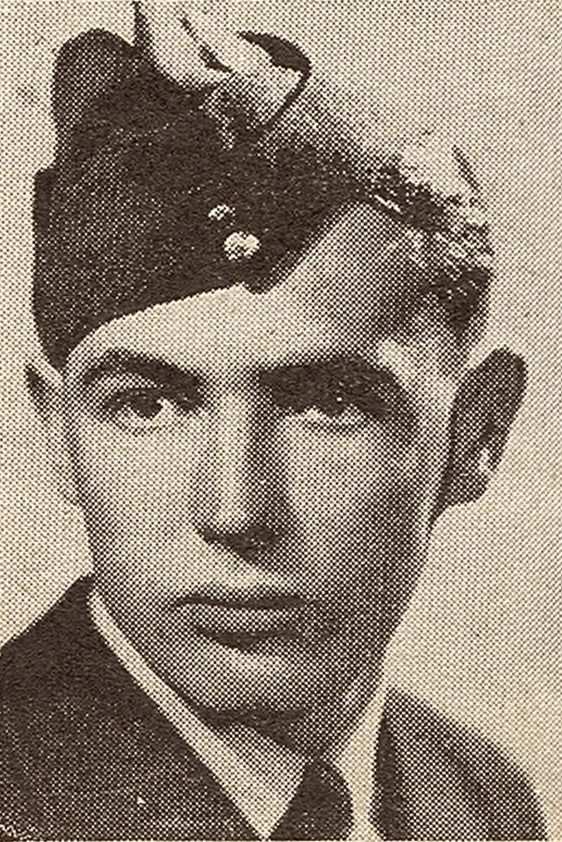
- Born: 13 October 1921; Auckland, New Zealand
- Died: 24 September 1943 (aged 21) near Beauvais, France
- Burial place: Marissel French National Cemetery, Beauvais, France
- Military career
- Allegiance: New Zealand
- Branch: Royal New Zealand Air Force
- Service years: 1940–1943 †
- Rank: Flight Lieutenant
- Units: No. 91 Squadron; No. 185 Squadron; No. 111 Squadron
- Conflicts: Second World War; Circus offensive; Battle of Malta
- Awards: Distinguished Flying Cross

Gray Stenborg DFC (13 October 1921 – 24 September 1943) was a New Zealand flying ace of the Royal New Zealand Air Force (RNZAF) during the Second World War. He is credited with having shot down fifteen aircraft.

Born in Auckland, Stenborg joined the RNZAF in July 1940. After receiving flight training in New Zealand and Canada, he was sent to England to serve with the Royal Air Force. His first operational posting was to No. 485 Squadron and he later flew with No. 111 Squadron. During his time with the latter, he destroyed four German aircraft. In June 1942, he was sent to Malta as a reinforcement pilot, flying a Supermarine Spitfire off the flight deck of HMS Eagle to the island where he joined No. 185 Squadron. He destroyed several aircraft during his time on Malta, returning to the United Kingdom in late August 1942. After a period of time as an instructor, he was posted to No. 91 Squadron. Stenborg was killed on 24 September 1943 during a mission escorting bombers to France.

== Early life ==
Gray Stenborg was born in Auckland on 13 October 1921, the only son of Gunnar Stenborg, a Swedish emigrant to New Zealand, and his wife Ruby (née Moore). The family lived in the Auckland suburb of Parnell and Stenborg was educated at King's College, where he played in the school's first XI cricket team. He was also active in rowing and yachting.

== Second World War ==
In July 1940, Stenborg joined the Royal New Zealand Air Force and underwent initial training at Whenuapai as an aircrafthand on Blackburn Baffin and Vickers Vildebeest aircraft. Despite periods of sickness, by the end of the year he was an airman pilot and went on to No. 4 Elementary Flying Training School in February 1941. Two months later, he proceeded to Canada for further flight training at No. 32 Service Flying Training School. He gained his wings and was promoted to sergeant in August. Shortly afterwards he was dispatched to England to serve with the Royal Air Force (RAF).

=== United Kingdom ===
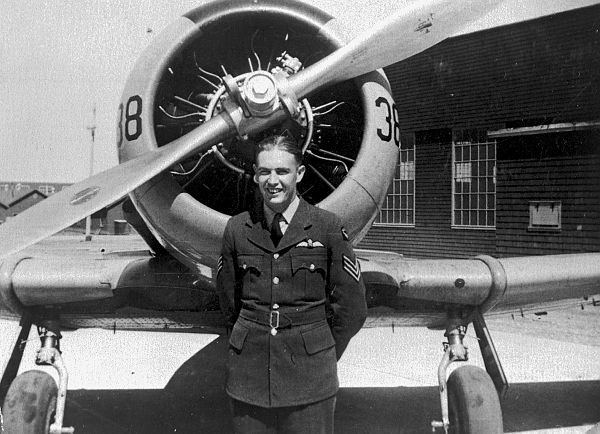
Stenborg standing in front of a North American Harvard trainer during his time in Canada, 1941

On arrival in the United Kingdom in September, Stenborg went to No. 58 Operational Training Unit (OTU) at Grangemouth, for familiarisation on the Supermarine Spitfire fighter. In December he was posted to No. 485 Squadron. With mostly New Zealand flying personnel and equipped with Spitfires, this was based at Kenley and engaged in the RAF's Circus offensive, which involved operations to German-occupied Europe intended to engage and wear down the Luftwaffe fighter presence there. Stenborg only flew on three operations before being transferred to No. 111 Squadron in January 1942. Like his previous unit, the squadron was engaged in the Circus offensive, flying Spitfires from Debden. Stenborg claimed his first aerial victory on 26 April, shooting down a Focke-Wulf Fw 190 fighter near St. Omer. He destroyed a Fw 190 in the same area the next day and then on 30 April shot down another two Fw 190s, near Andres and Abbeville respectively.

=== Malta ===
In early June 1942, Stenborg, now a pilot officer, was sent to Malta, sailing aboard the aircraft carrier HMS Eagle as a reinforcement for the squadrons operating from the island, which was besieged by the Luftwaffe and Regia Aeronautica (Royal Italian Air Force). He flew a Spitfire off the flight deck of Eagle early in the morning of 9 June and on arrival at Malta was assigned to No. 185 Squadron at Hal Far. Stenborg was one of four pilots of the squadron who were scrambled in the evening of 15 June to deal with a bombing raid on a convoy approaching Malta from the southwest. On reaching the convoy, which was about 48 kilometres (30 mi) from Gozo, he damaged two Junkers Ju 88 medium bombers and destroyed an escorting Messerschmitt Bf 109 fighter. He shot down two Bf 109s on 5 July; they were part of a group of between 15 and 20 fighters escorting Ju 88s making a bombing raid on Malta. Another two Bf 109s were destroyed by Stenborg on 9 July, when he was part of a group of 30 Spitfires that intercepted six Ju 88s and escorting fighters raiding Takali. For his exploits during the early part of the month, he was awarded the Distinguished Flying Cross (DFC). The citation, published on 28 July in the London Gazette, read:

Pilot Officer Stenborg has displayed great determination and keenness to engage the enemy. One day in July, 1942, he encountered a superior force of enemy fighters which were acting as escort to bombers. Pilot Officer Stenborg attacked the enemy fighters, destroying two of them, and dispersed the remainder, thus enabling other Royal Air Force fighters to attack the bombers. A few days later he completed a similar operation and again shot down two enemy fighters. Pilot Officer Stenborg has now destroyed eight enemy aircraft.

— London Gazette, No. 35646, 28 July 1942

On the last day of July, while carrying out an air test on a Spitfire, Stenborg encountered three Bf 109s. Having the benefit of height he surprised the trio, destroying one of them. On 17 August, while leading a flight of four Spitfires, he came across several Bf 109s near Kalafrana. One of the pilots in his flight destroyed two Bf 109s while Stenborg shot down another. However, his aircraft was badly damaged. With his aircraft in a dive from 8,200 metres (26,900 ft), he struggled to open the hood. He was eventually able to bale out, landing in the sea 8 kilometres (5.0 mi) from Malta and taking to his inflatable dinghy before being rescued. He later admitted that the experience "shook him to his teeth". By this time, Stenborg had been joined at No. 185 Squadron by another New Zealander, John Houlton, who later described him as "an amusing, volatile type". According to Houlton, when he arrived at the squadron earlier in the month, Stenborg had just been grounded for performing low-level acrobatics over the squadron's airfield.

=== Service with No. 91 Squadron ===
Having flown 34 operational flights for No. 185 Squadron, Stenborg returned to England in late August 1942 and spent a period of time on instructing duties at No. 58 OTU. He then went on to Flight Leaders School before being posted in May 1943 to No. 91 Squadron. It was based at Hawkinge and was equipped with Mk XII Spitfires, flying on offensive sorties to German-occupied Europe and escorting bombers. Now a flight lieutenant, on 24 August, Stenborg shared in the destruction of a Fw 190 near Bernay and on 4 September claimed sole credit for shooting down another Fw 190 and damaging a second, both near Le Touquet. He destroyed a Bf 109 over Verneuil on 16 September and shot down a Bf 109 to the northeast of Rouen a week later.

The next day, 24 September, while flying a Ramrod mission escorting bombers to Beauvais in France, No. 91 Squadron encountered a large group of enemy fighters. During the resulting dogfight, Stenborg was shot down and killed. His aircraft crashed 14 kilometres (8.7 mi) from Beauvais. He was buried nearby at the Marissel French National Cemetery, Oise. By the time of his death, Stenborg had flown 120 operational flights for No. 91 Squadron and 188 sorties altogether. He was credited with having destroyed fifteen aircraft, one of which was shared with other pilots, and damaging three others.

== Legacy ==
Stenborg is one of the 191 New Zealanders killed in the Second World War who are listed on the Takapuna War Memorial in Auckland. He is also listed on the nearby Howick and Pakuranga First World War Memorial, in a section for those killed in the Second World War.
