= No. 105 Squadron RAF =

Defunct flying squadron of the Royal Air Force

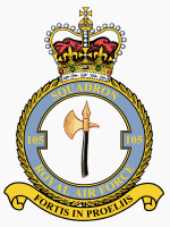
- No. 105 Squadron badge
- Active: 23 Sep 1917 – 1 Feb 1920; 12 Apr 1937 – 1 Feb 1946; 21 Feb 1962 – 20 Jan 1968
- Country: United Kingdom
- Branch: Royal Air Force
- Nickname: "Hereford's own Squadron"
- Mottos: Latin: Fortis in Proeliis ("Valiant in battles")

Commanders
- Notable commanders: Wing Cdr H.I. Edwards; Wing Cdr T.W. Horton

Insignia
- Squadron Badge heraldry: A battle axe The battle axe commemorates the fact that at one time the squadron was equipped with Battle aircraft. The emerald green handle of the axe signifies the squadron's service in Ireland.
- Squadron Codes: MT (Oct 1938); GB (Sep 1939 – Jan 1946 )

No. 105 Squadron was a flying squadron of the Royal Air Force, active for three periods between 1917 and 1969. It was originally established during the First World War as a squadron of the Royal Flying Corps and disbanded after the war. Reactivated shortly before the Second World War, it was inactive again after the conflict. During its second existence it was a bomber unit and had the distinction to be the first to operate the de Havilland Mosquito light bomber. During the 1960s it was reactivated again for six years to provide transport support for the British Army in the Aden Protectorate and the Far East.

== History ==
=== Formation and early years ===
No. 105 Squadron of the Royal Flying Corps was formed on 23 September 1917 at RAF Waddington and soon moved to RAF Andover, Hampshire with a variety of aircraft to train as a bomber squadron. Before it became operational it was decided to move the squadron to Omagh, County Tyrone, with RE8 biplanes on anti-submarine and reconnaissance duties. Within a year it had re-equipped with the Bristol F2B Fighter. Though other squadrons were disbanded after the armistice, 105 Squadron continued on duties in Ireland until 1 February 1920, when the squadron was disbanded by being re-numbered to 2 Squadron at Oranmore.

=== Reformation and World War II ===
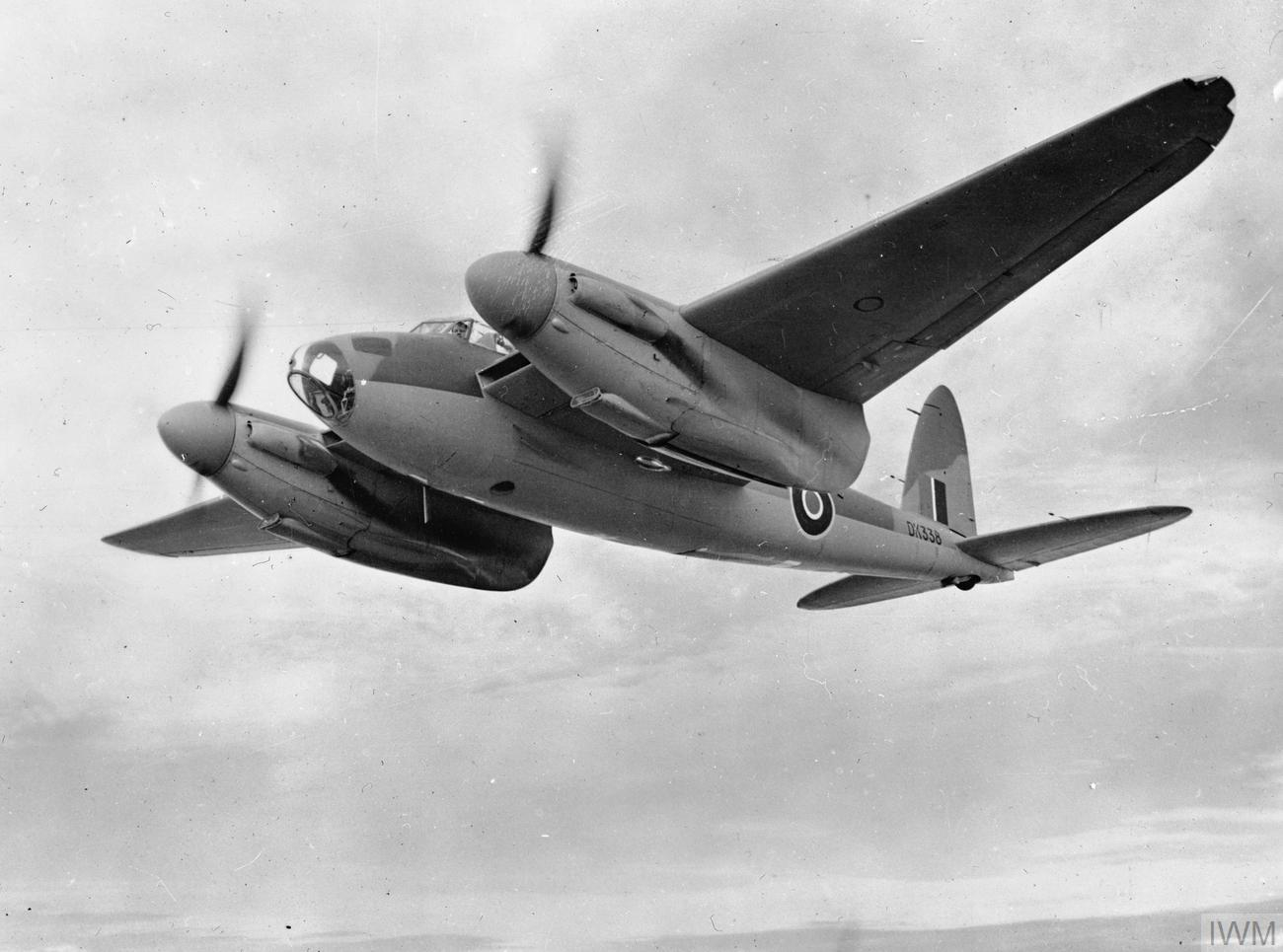
105 Sqn Mosquito B.IV (serial DK338).

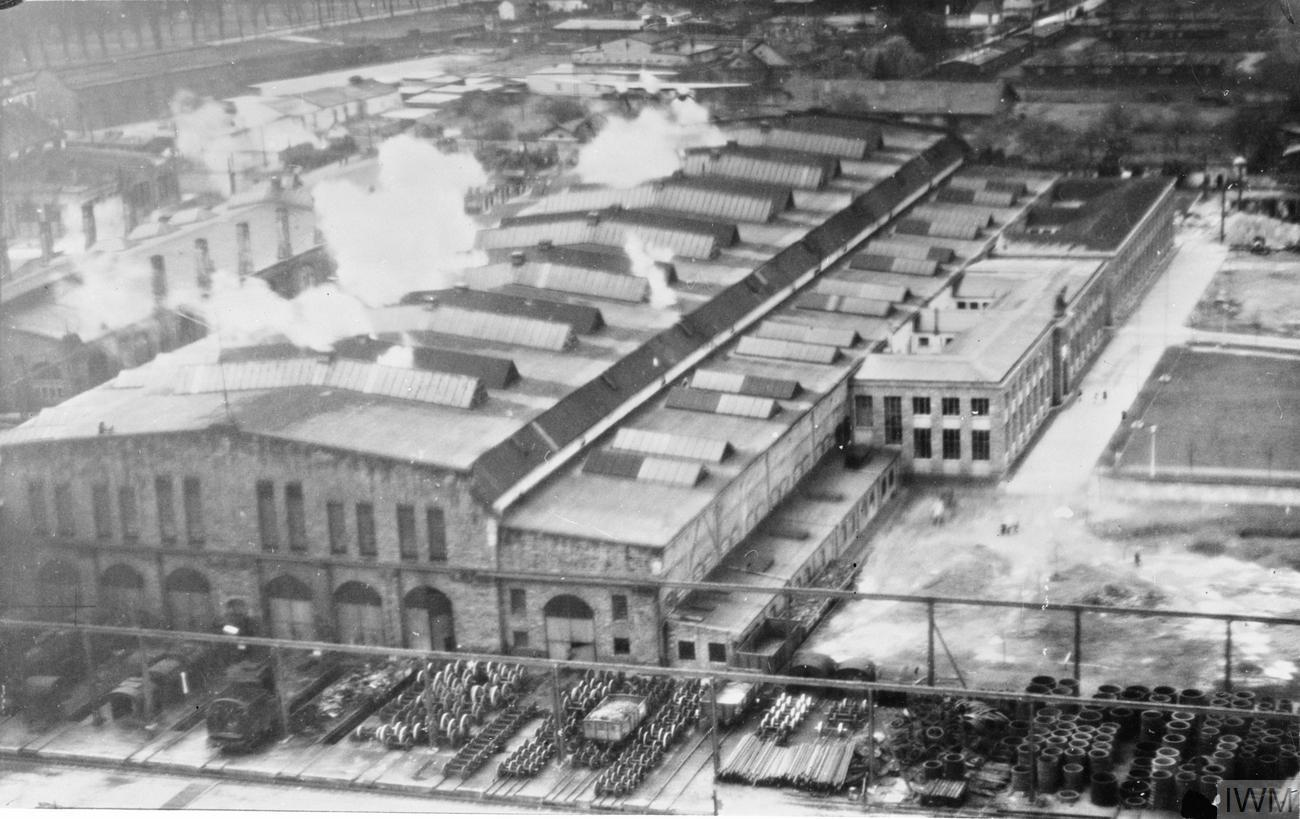
Photo of an attack by six 105 Sqn Mosquito B.IVs on the railyard in Trier, Germany, 1 April 1943.

The squadron was formed again on 12 April 1937 at RAF Harwell from B Flight of 18 Squadron as a day bomber squadron. Its first equipment was the biplane Hawker Audax while it awaited delivery of the more modern monoplane Fairey Battle. The Battles arrived in August 1937 and 105 Squadron was one of the first to be operational on the type.

At the start of the Second World War in September 1939, as part of the Advanced Air Striking Force, the squadron moved to France, initially on reconnaissance missions along the France-German border. The Germans invaded France in May 1940 and the squadron was soon busy attacking the advancing German troops. One of the most important targets was the bombing of the bridges over the River Meuse in attempt to slow down the German advance. It suffered heavily from the attention of German fighters and the squadron had to retire back to England in June 1940. At RAF Honington the squadron was re-equipped with the Bristol Blenheim to join 2 Group's offensive against the invasion ports and German shipping. The squadron had many losses particularly from the German Flak ships. In October 1940 part of the squadron was detached to Malta to carry out attacks on Axis shipping in the Mediterranean Sea. It moved to RAF Swanton Morley in Norfolk. After losing its commanding officer in a raid near Stavanger in 1941, it gained a new CO, Wing Commander H.I. Edwards. For his part in planning and leading a low level daylight attack on the port of Bremen he was awarded the Victoria Cross.

In October 1941 the Malta detachment returned to England and the squadron began to operate at a reduced level. The reason for the reduction in sorties was the squadron had been chosen to be the first to use the Mosquito Mk.IV and was concentrating on training. In December the squadron moved to RAF Horsham St Faith near Norwich.

On the 2 July 1942, No. 105 Squadron raided the submarine yards at Flensburg, near the border of Germany and Denmark. Flying a Mosquito FB Mk. IV, Reg. DK 298, Wing Commander Alan Robertson Oakeshott DFC flew his final mission, departing from RAF Horsham St. Faith, Norfolk. The bomb load of 4,000lbs was successfully dropped on the submarine slipways. Shortly after leaving the target area the aircraft was intercepted by a Focke-Wulf Fw 190. The Mosquito was shot down. W/Cdr (33209) Alan Robertson Oakeshott DFC (pilot) RAF was killed. He is commemorated on the RAF Runnymeade Memorial and on the Naphill War Memorial, in Buckinghamshire, near RAF High Wycombe (formerly Bomber Command). F/O (44980) Vernon Frank Evans Treherne DFM (obs) RAF – was also killed in this action.

The squadrons commanding officer, Wing Commander Geoffrey Longfield, was killed during a raid on Rennes on 26 February 1943. His replacement, Wing Commander John William Deacon, was killed the following day in a training accident.

Another early Mosquito operation was a high-level attack on Cologne as a follow-on to the "thousand-bomber" raid on the city. It was not the best use of the new aircraft and the squadron soon moved to low-level precision attacks where the aircraft had an outstanding performance. The first precision attack was against the Gestapo Headquarters in Oslo on 25 September 1942. The squadron was the first to do a daylight raid on Berlin on 30 January 1943. By June 1943 the squadron joined No. 8 (Pathfinder) Group and upgraded to Oboe-equipped Mosquito Mk.IXs. It performed precision target-marking for Bomber Command until the end of the war. The squadron was disbanded at RAF Upwood on 1 February 1946.

=== Post war ===
Between 1949 and 1957 the squadron was linked with 109 Squadron as 109/105 Squadron, but on 21 February 1962 the squadron re-formed in its own right at RAF Benson with the Armstrong Whitworth Argosy, a medium-range tactical transport. By June it had moved to RAF Khormaksar, Aden, to provide support to ground forces in the area. It also carried out transport runs through the middle-east and parts of Africa. It was involved in paradropping supplies to the British Army during operations in the Radfan and was also involved in supporting the operations in Borneo. In 1966 it was supporting troops in Aden again. When the terrorist activity worsened, it was also tasked with providing search-and-rescue searches over the Indian Ocean and Red Sea. As the British withdrawal from Aden got nearer the squadron moved out the Muharraq, Bahrain, in 1967. On 20 January 1968 the squadron disbanded for the last time there.

== Aircraft operated ==
Aircraft operated by No. 105 Squadron
From	To	Aircraft	Variant	Notes
September 1917	April 1918	Various		Airco DH.6, Royal Aircraft Factory B.E.2, Airco DH.9
April 1918	January 1919	Royal Aircraft Factory R.E.8		
December 1918	February 1920	Bristol F2B Fighter		
April 1937	October 1937	Hawker Audax		
August 1937	June 1940	Fairey Battle	Mk.I	
June 1940	May 1942	Bristol Blenheim	Mk.IV	
November 1941	March 1944	de Havilland Mosquito	Mk.IV	
July 1943	February 1945	de Havilland Mosquito	Mk.IX	
March 1944	February 1946	de Havilland Mosquito	Mk.XVI	
January 1962	January 1968	Armstrong Whitworth Argosy	C.1	

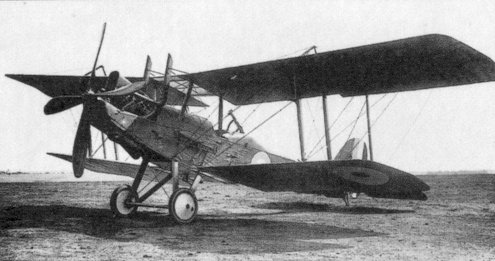
A Royal Aircraft Factory R.E.8

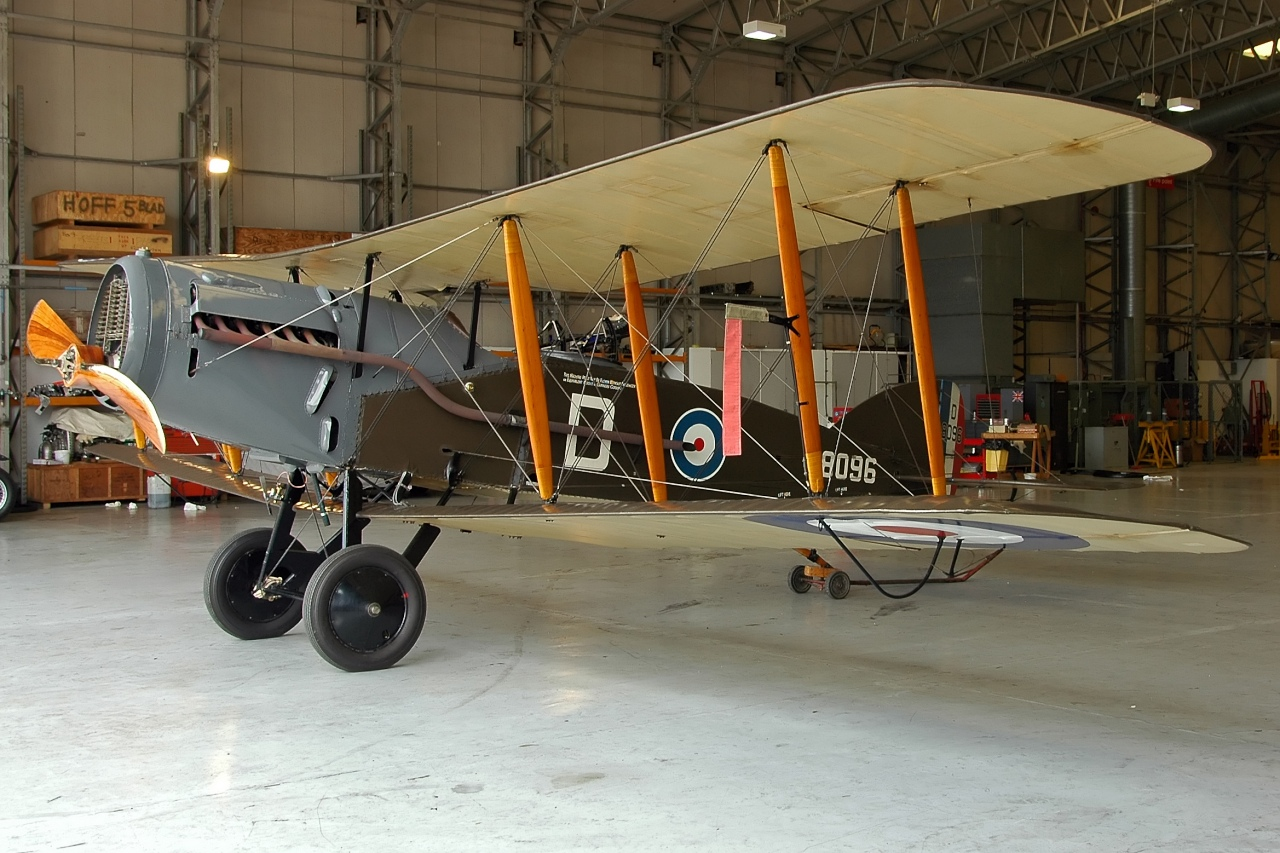
A Bristol F2B of the Shuttleworth Collection

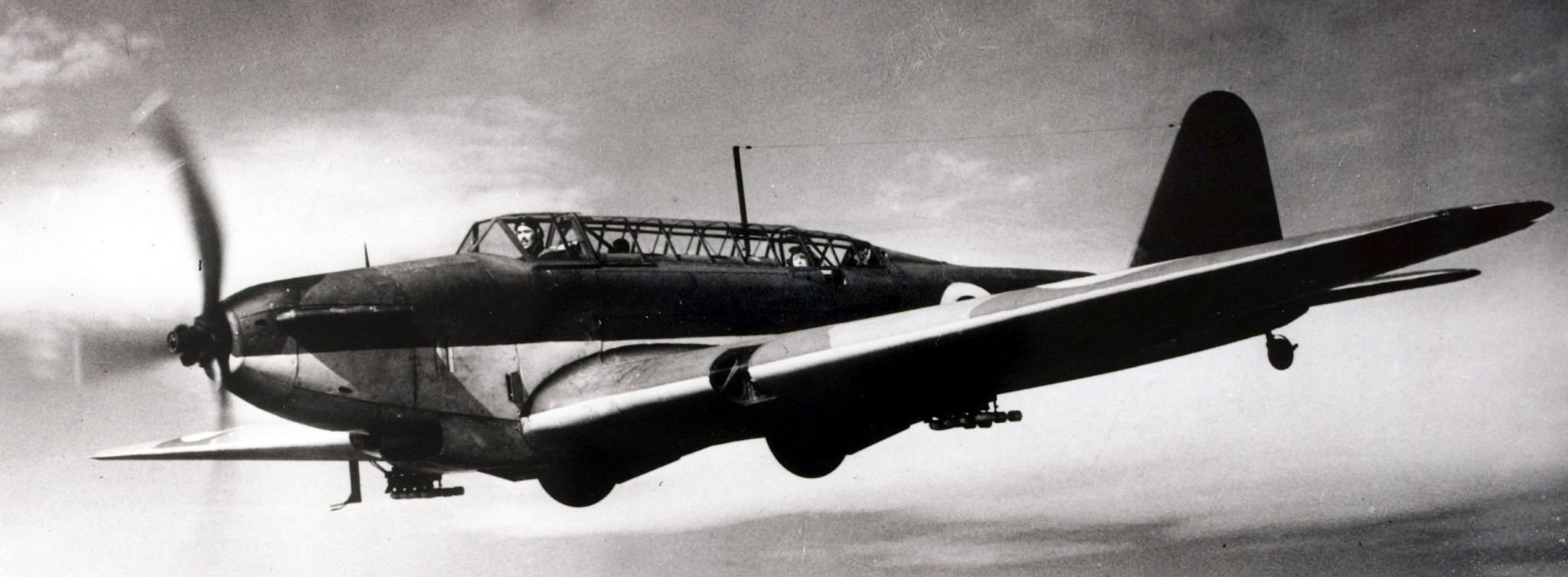
A Fairey Battle

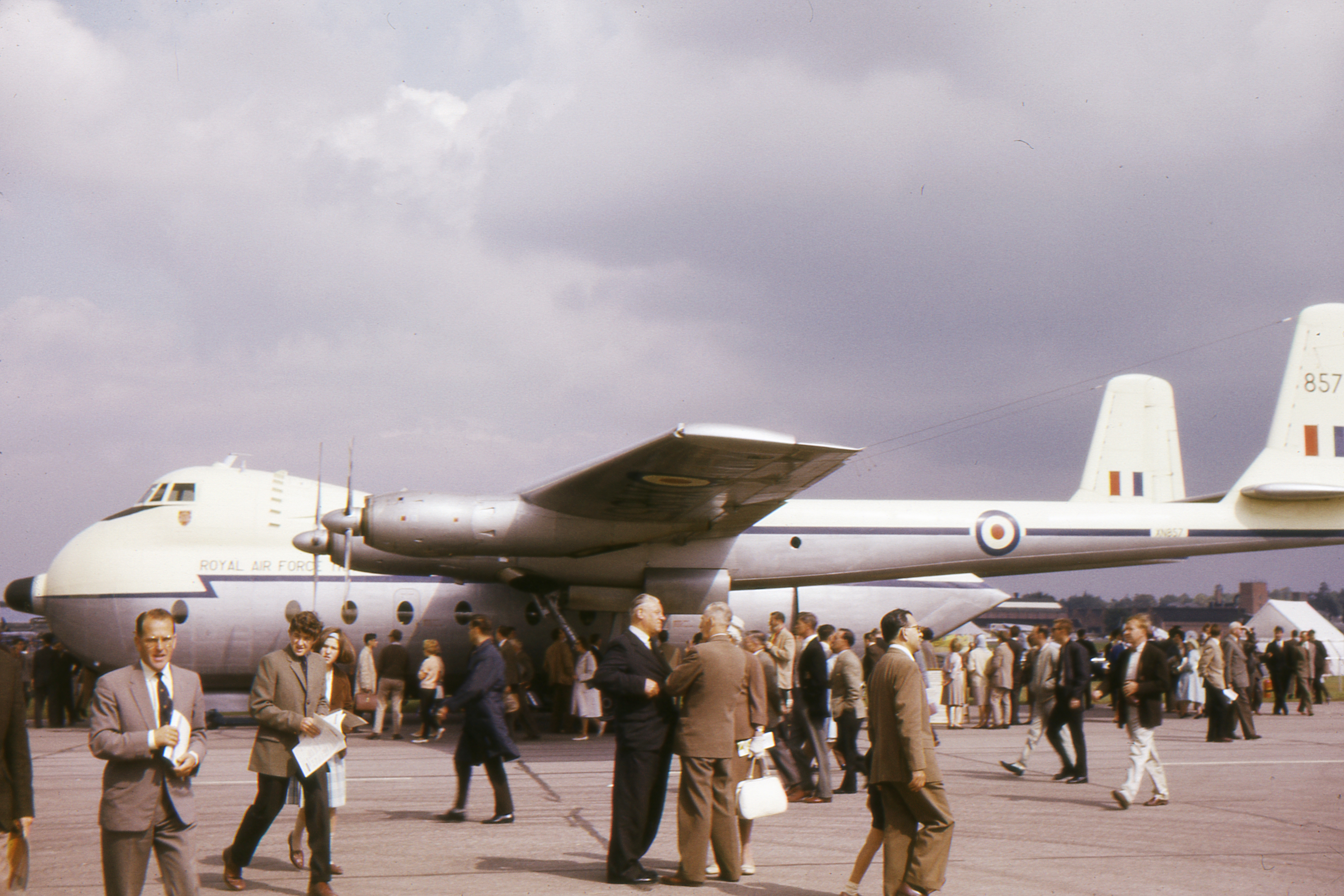
An Armstrong Whitworth Argosy in 1962

== See also ==
- Hughie Edwards
- Thomas W. Horton
- John Wooldridge
- Kenneth Wolstenholme
