= Gilbert Hayton =

New Zealand flying ace

- Born: 12 May 1917; Hāwera, New Zealand
- Died: 20 October 1942 (aged 25); At sea, northeast of Ascension Island
- Military career
- Allegiance: New Zealand
- Branch: Royal Air Force
- Rank: Flight Lieutenant
- Nickname: 'Gillie'
- Service number: 42503
- Units: No. 266 Squadron; No. 66 Squadron; No. 255 Squadron; No. 1435 Flight
- Conflicts: Second World War; The Blitz; Siege of Malta
- Awards: Distinguished Flying Cross

Gilbert McLean Hayton DFC (12 May 1917 – 20 October 1942) was a New Zealand fighter pilot and flying ace who flew in the Royal Air Force (RAF) during the Second World War. He was officially credited with the destruction of at least five enemy aircraft.

Born in Hāwera, Hayton joined the RAF in early 1939. After completing flight training, and initial service with units operating the Fairey Battle light bomber, he was posted to No. 266 Squadron, a fighter unit equipped with Supermarine Spitfires in August 1940. He subsequently flew Spitfires with No. 66 Squadron. At the end of the year he was posted to No. 255 Squadron and flew the Boulton Paul Defiant fighter on night fighting duties during The Blitz. Sent to the Middle East in February 1942, he flew Bristol Beaufighter night fighters with No. 1435 Flight, achieving a number of aerial victories operating from Malta during the siege of that island. Hayton died at sea after the ship on which he was travelling was torpedoed while en route to the United Kingdom. His award of the Distinguished Flying Cross was announced after his death.

== Early life ==
Gilbert McLean Hayton was born on 12 May 1917 in Hāwera, New Zealand, the son of Ernest and Lilian Hayton. He was educated at New Plymouth Boys' High School, before going on to Wellington Technical College and Victoria University College. He graduated with a Bachelor of Commerce and briefly taught at Wellington Technical College. He also served in the Territorial Force from 1934 to 1939 as a gunner, firstly in the field artillery and then subsequently in the garrison artillery.

In April 1939, Hayton, who was nicknamed Gillie, was a successful applicant for a short service commission in the Royal Air Force and left New Zealand for the United Kingdom the following month. He commenced flight training at No. 10 Elementary & Reserve Flying Training School at Yatesbury on 12 June. Passing through the first phase of training, he was commissioned as an acting pilot officer in August with the service number 42503 and proceeded to No. 2 Flying Training School in early September and then to No. 10 Service Flying Training School. He gained his wings on 12 December.

== Second World War ==
After a period of time at No. 12 Operational Training Unit familiarising himself with the Fairey Battle light bomber, Hayton was posted to No. 98 Squadron in mid-May 1940. By this time, he had been confirmed in his rank as pilot officer. He was only here for a couple of weeks before being sent to No. 12 Squadron, also operating Battles.

In August, Hayton was posted to No. 266 Squadron, which had been heavily engaged in the Battle of Britain and withdrawn to Wittering for a respite. Operating Supermarine Spitfire fighters, it was only occasionally involved in scrambles when called up to provide aerial cover for Duxford. After two months, Hayton was transferred to No. 66 Squadron, another fighter unit operating Spitfires, on 27 October. Flying from West Malling, on 14 November, he engaged two Junkers Ju 87 dive bombers, damaging both. However, his Spitfire was also damaged and he had to make a crash landing.

In December, Hayton was assigned to No. 255 Squadron. The squadron was newly reformed for night fighting duties with the Boulton Paul Defiant fighter and based at Kirton-in-Lindsey. It became operational in January 1941 and was soon flying extensively during the Blitz. In June, it began to upgrade to the Bristol Beaufighter and from August to late September it was non-operational. Aerial activity was limited once it returned to operations due to weather and teething issues with the Beaufighter. Hayton, who had been promoted to flying officer in March, was briefly attached to the Blind Approach Calibration Flight at Oxford during his time with the squadron.

=== Mediterranean ===
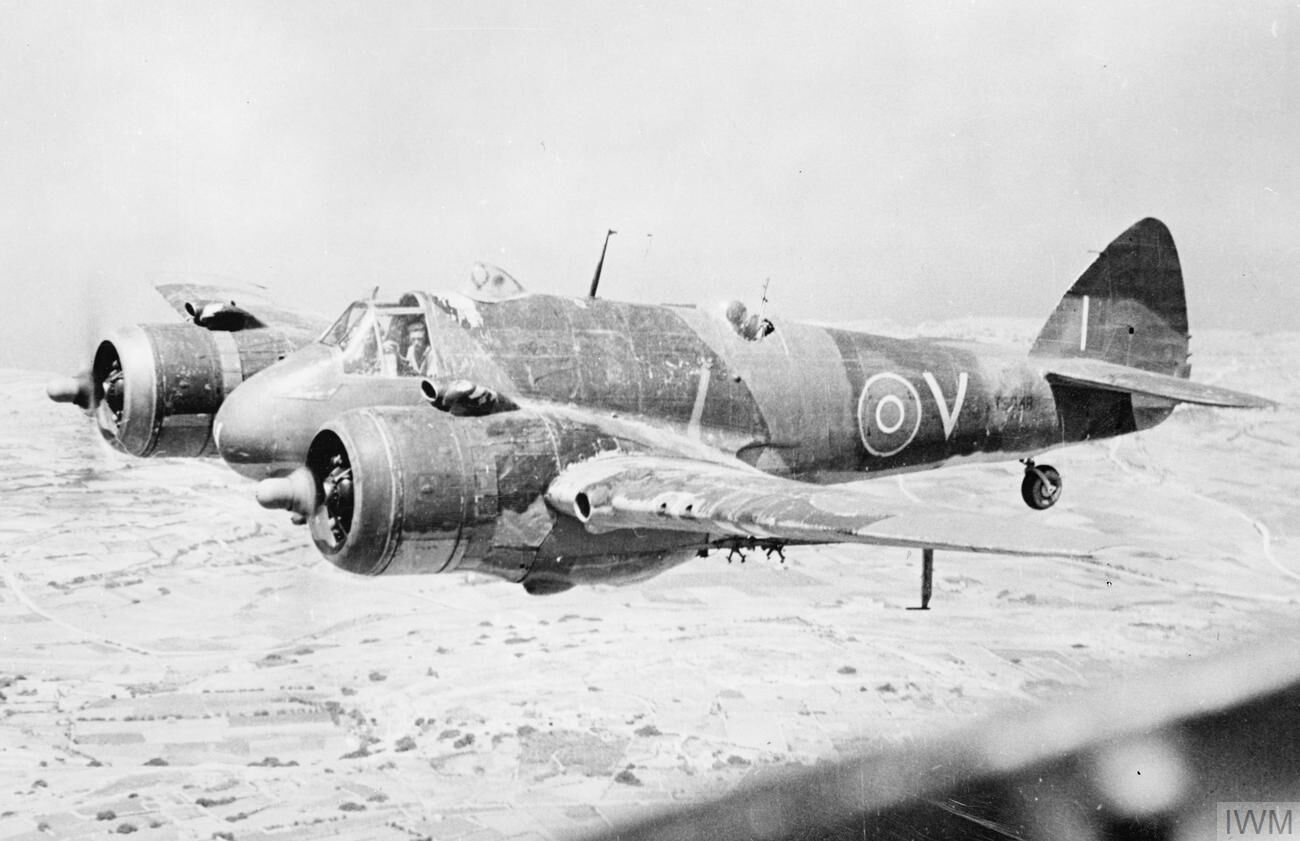
A Bristol Beaufighter over Malta

In February 1942, Hayton was posted to the Middle East, joining No. 89 Squadron at Abu Sueir. Promoted to flight lieutenant on 9 March, he led one of the squadron's flights to the Mediterranean island of Malta to join No. 1435 Flight, the local night fighter unit. Paired with Pilot Officer H. Josling as his radar operator, Hayton made his first claim with his new unit on the night of 12 March, when he engaged and damaged an unidentified bomber. Subsequent research by military aviation historians Christopher Shores and Clive Williams suggests that this may have been a Junkers Ju 88 medium bomber, which was recorded as having been lost in the night in question.

On the night of 19 March, Hayton engaged and destroyed a Fiat BR.20 Cicogna. He shot down a Ju 88 on 8 April over Safi. He destroyed another BR.20 on 17 May and then a second on 22 May, this time near Gela. Another BR.20 was claimed by Hayton as probably destroyed in the same sortie, although Shores and Williams note that it actually returned home, with wounded crew. A Ju 87 of the Regia Aeronautica (Italian Air Force) was damaged by Hayton on the night of 29 May, and he engaged and destroyed Ju 88s on 14 June and 17 June respectively.

Towards the end of June, Hayton returned to Egypt and service with No. 89 Squadron. He and Josling was posted back to the United Kingdom later in the year. Departing Cape Town, in South Africa, in early September aboard the RMS Laconia, the ship was torpedoed by the U-Boat U-156 on 12 September to the northeast of Ascension Island. Although Hayton survived, taking to a lifeboat with 50 other survivors, he subsequently died of thirst and exposure. His date of death was deemed to be 20 October, the date on which his lifeboat was found by searchers; there were only four survivors from Hayton's lifeboat. Josling, in another lifeboat, survived as he was picked up after six days.

Hayton's award of the Distinguished Flying Cross had been published in The London Gazette in the week following the sinking of the Laconia. His total number of aerial victories is uncertain, due to variance between official records and research conducted in the postwar period. Shores and Williams credit him with destroying five, possibly six, aircraft, and also probably destroying one or two more. He has no known grave and is commemorated on the Commonwealth War Graves Commission's Alamein Memorial in Egypt.
