= Edward Darling (RAF officer) =

British flying ace of WWII

- Born: 11 October 1914; Wellington, Madras, British India
- Died: 2 June 1942 (aged 27); English Channel
- Military career
- Allegiance: United Kingdom
- Branch: Royal Air Force
- Service years: 1939–1942
- Rank: Flight Lieutenant
- Nickname: 'Mitzi'
- Units: No. 41 Squadron; No. 602 Squadron
- Conflicts: Second World War: Battle of Britain; Circus offensive
- Awards: Distinguished Flying Cross

Edward Darling, DFC (11 October 1914 – 2 June 1942) was a British flying ace who served with the Royal Air Force (RAF) during the Second World War. He was credited with having shot down at least six aircraft.

Born in British India, Darling worked in civil engineering and was a prewar volunteer in the Royal Air Force Volunteer Reserve. On the outbreak of the Second World War and was called up for service with the RAF in September 1939. Once his training was completed he was posted to No. 41 Squadron. He flew Supermarine Spitfire fighters during the Battle of Britain, claiming several aerial victories over the English Channel and along England's southern coast. He went missing, presumed killed, during an operation to German-occupied France on 2 June 1942.

== Early life ==
Edward Vivian Darling was born on 11 October 1914 at Wellington in Madras, British India, where his father was a schoolmaster. He was raised in Wembley in Middlesex and when his schooling was completed, worked in civil engineering. In August 1937, he joined the Royal Air Force Volunteer Reserve to train as a pilot.

== Second World War ==
On the outbreak of the Second World War in September 1939, Darling, who was nicknamed 'Mitzi', was called up for service with the Royal Air Force (RAF) and commenced further training. He was posted to No. 41 Squadron as a sergeant pilot in mid-December but at the end of the month went to Aston Down for familiarisation on Hawker Hurricane fighters. He was back at No. 41 Squadron by the end of January 1940. Despite his training on Hurricanes, the squadron was equipped with Supermarine Spitfire fighters and, operating from Catterick, carried out patrols along the East Coast and over shipping convoys until late May. At that time it relocated to Hornchurch for two weeks while it carried out patrols over the beaches at Dunkirk during the evacuation of the British Expeditionary Force. It returned to Catterick in mid-June.

=== Battle of Britain ===
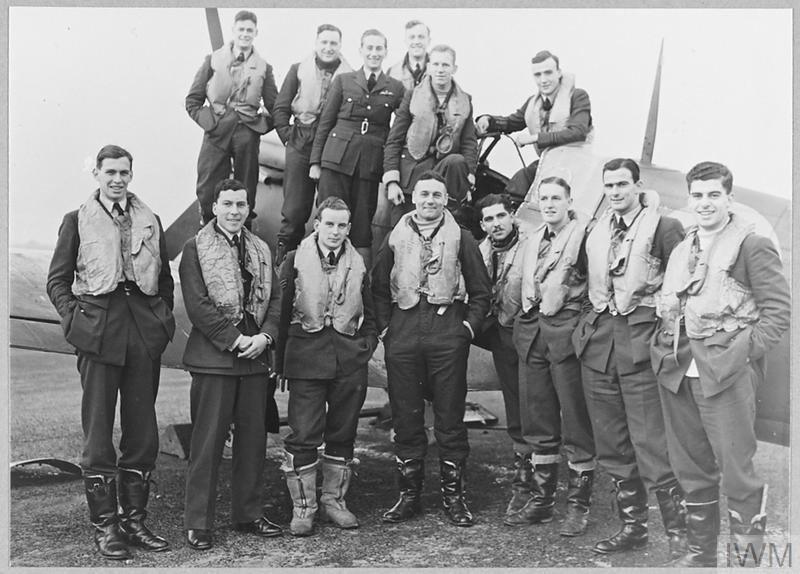
Pilots of No. 41 Squadron at Hornchurch, Essex, December 1940; Darling is in the top row, fourth from the left

As the Luftwaffe's aerial campaign against the southeast of England began to escalate in late July, No. 41 Squadron shifted back to Hornchurch for two weeks, then went back to Catterick. On 11 August, Darling shared in the destruction of a Junkers Ju 88 medium bomber over Helmsley. On 6 September, with the squadron once again operating from Hornchurch, he probably destroyed a Messerschmitt Bf 109 fighter over the Thames Estuary. Three days later he shot down a pair of Bf 109s near London. On 15 September, now known as Battle of Britain Day, he damaged a Dornier Do 17 medium bomber off Dover and later in the day, destroyed a Heinkel He 111 medium bomber near Hornchurch. Darling shot down a Bf 109 near Dover on 18 September, and also damaged a Ju 88 near Chatham. On 23 September he damaged a Bf 109 over Dover.

The next day, his Spitfire was damaged in an encounter with the Luftwaffe, forcing Darling to ditch in the sea off the coast of Kent. He was shot down again on 27 September, this time over West Malling. He bailed out although was wounded as a result of the engagement. Hospitalised at Preston Hall Hospital, he soon returned to the squadron. The pace of operations slowed across October and into November and the squadron began to receive the new Spitfire Mk II. Flying one of these, he shot down a Bf 109 near Tonbridge on 27 November.

=== Circus offensive ===
In January 1941, No. 41 Squadron switched to offensive operations to German-occupied France, carrying out bomber escort duties. However this was only for a few weeks before it returned to Catterick in February. On reduced operations, it reverted to the older Spitfire Mk Is. By this time Darling was a pilot officer, having been commissioned the previous month. While at Catterick Darling resumed his friendship with Alan Deere, the well-known New Zealand flying ace of No. 54 Squadron, who he had known since they were both based at Hornchurch the previous year. The two developed a routine of referring to each other by their surnames when ordering drinks at the local pub, which caused amusement among their companions.

When Deere was posted to No. 602 Squadron as a flight commander, he requested Darling join him and he duly arrived in June. The squadron, another Spitfire-equipped unit, was part of the Kenley Wing and regularly flew Circus operations. Darling was promoted to acting flight lieutenant in August and posted away to No. 616 Squadron to lead a flight there. The next month Deere, who had just become commanding officer of No. 602 Squadron arranged for Darling's return. He was subsequently recognised for his successes over the preceding months with an award of the Distinguished Flying Cross. The citation was published in The London Gazette and read:

This officer has been engaged in active operations over a long period and has proved himself to be a skilful and courageous fighter pilot. He fought in the Dunkirk operations and later in the Battle of Britain. He has since completed 32 operational sweeps and throughout he has displayed excellent leadership, keenness and efficiency. He has destroyed at least 3 enemy aircraft and damaged a further 2.

— London Gazette, No. 35312, 17 October 1941

Later in October, Darling's substantive rank was made up to flying officer. At the start of 1942, he was rested from operations and posted as instructor to No. 53 Operational Training Unit at Llandow in Wales. He was still there in May, at which time he was posted to No. 403 Squadron as one of its flight commanders. Deere was the squadron's commander and had specifically asked for Darling. The squadron was stationed at Rochford and involved in the Circus offensive.

Darling failed to return from a sortie to France on 2 June 1942; his Spitfire was seen going down into the English Channel off Calais after being shot down by Focke Wulf 190 fighters. Despite aerial searches mounted by Deere, he was not found and is believed to have died. He is credited with having shot down six aircraft, one of which was shared with another pilot, as well as damaging three others. He is also credited with the probable destruction of one aircraft. With no known grave, Darling is commemorated on the Air Forces Memorial at Englefield Green.

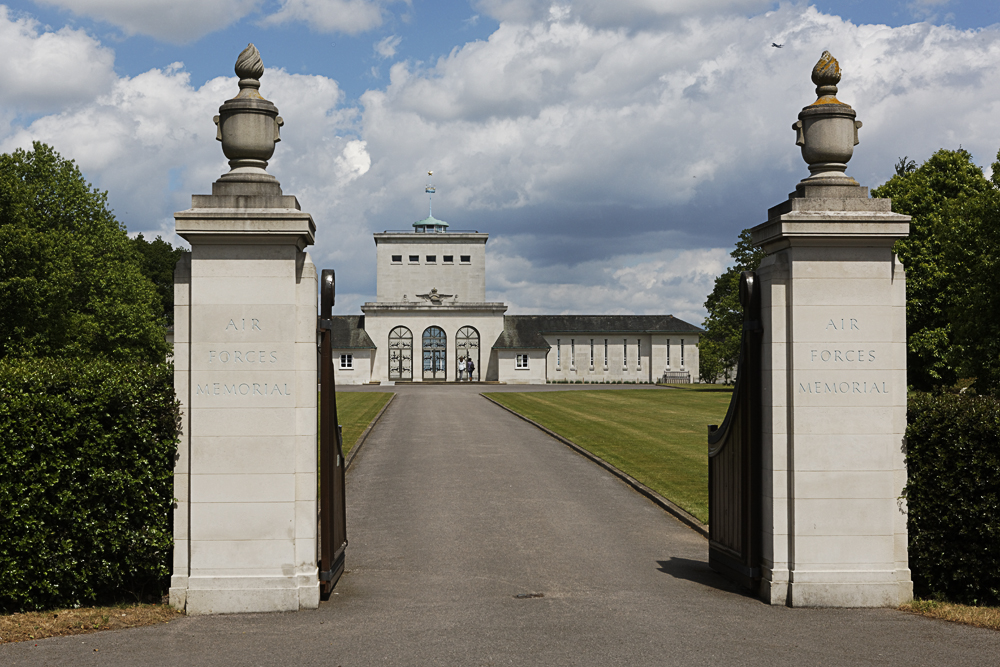
The Air Forces Memorial at Englefield Green in England, where Darling is commemorated
