= James Latta =

James Latta may refer to:

- James P. Latta (1844–1911), Nebraska Democratic politician
- James Latta (RAF officer) (1897–1974), British World War I flying ace
