= Alan Deere =

New Zealand flying ace (1917–1995)

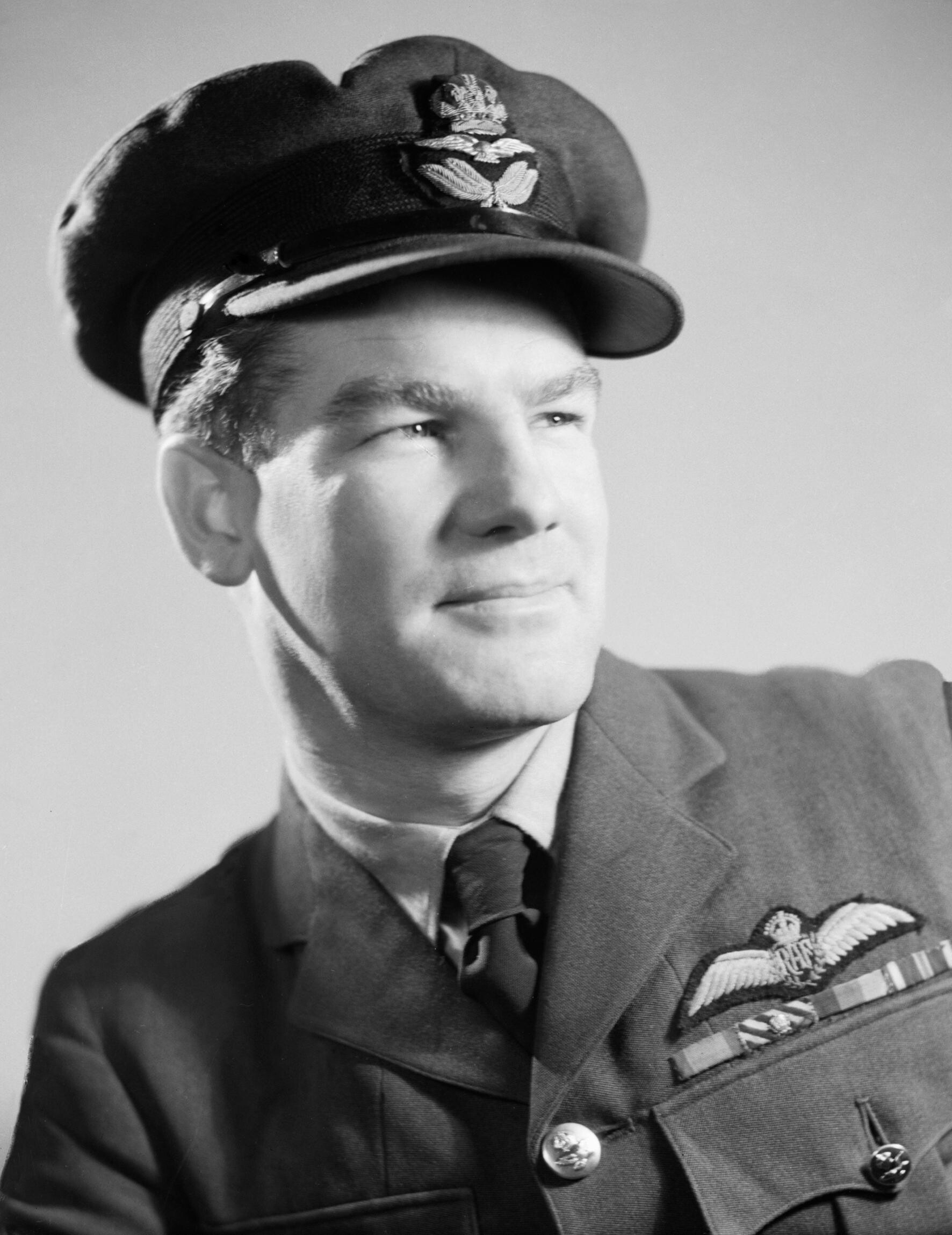
- Alan Deere, July 1944
- Born: Alan Christoper Deere; 12 December 1917; Westport, New Zealand
- Died: 21 September 1995 (aged 77); United Kingdom
- Military career
- Allegiance: United Kingdom; British Empire
- Branch: Royal Air Force
- Service years: 1937–1967
- Rank: Air Commodore
- Nickname: Al
- Unit: No. 54 Squadron
- Commands: No. 602 Squadron; No. 403 Squadron RCAF; Biggin Hill Wing; RAF Duxford; RAF North Weald; 12 (East Anglia) Sector, Fighter Command; No. 1 School of Technical Training
- Conflicts: Second World War; Battle of France; Battle of Britain; Invasion of Normandy
- Awards: Distinguished Service Order; Officer of the Order of the British Empire; Distinguished Flying Cross & Bar; Croix de Guerre (France); Distinguished Flying Cross (United States)
- Other work: Author

Air Commodore Alan Christopher Deere, DSO, OBE, DFC & Bar (12 December 1917 – 21 September 1995) was a New Zealand fighter ace with the Royal Air Force (RAF) during the Second World War. He was also known for several near-death experiences over the course of the war. This led to his published autobiography being titled Nine Lives.

Born in Westport, New Zealand, in 1917, Deere was commissioned in the RAF in January 1938. Posted to No. 54 Squadron, he flew Supermarine Spitfires during the Battle of France and became a fighter ace by the end of May 1940. For his exploits he was awarded the Distinguished Flying Cross (DFC) the following month. He participated in the subsequent Battle of Britain, during which he shot down several more enemy aircraft, and had his Spitfire destroyed from under him more than once. His continued accomplishments earned him a bar to his DFC in September 1940. He was soon promoted to squadron leader, and commanded No. 403 Squadron RCAF for several months in 1942. He led a fighter wing from Biggin Hill for six months in 1943, and was awarded the Distinguished Service Order for his achievements. By the end of the war, he was credited with the destruction of 22 enemy aircraft, ranking him the second-highest scoring New Zealand fighter ace. Later research has seen this total revised to 17 victories.

Deere remained in the RAF after the war, commanding several stations and training establishments. He also wrote his autobiography, which was published in 1959. He left military service in 1967, having risen to the rank of air commodore, and continued to live in the United Kingdom. In civilian life, he worked with the RAF as its sporting director until his retirement in 1972. As a well-known fighter ace of the Second World War, he was sought after by media and historians for commentary and interviews on air warfare. He died of cancer in 1995.

== Early life ==
Alan Christopher Deere was born in Westport, New Zealand, on 12 December 1917, the third of six children of Terrence Deere, a New Zealand Railways worker, and his wife, Teresa née Curtain. Descended from Irish immigrants, the family lived in Westport, on the coast of the South Island, until 1930, when they moved to Wanganui. Deere attended Marist Brothers' School and then Wanganui Technical College, becoming an accomplished athlete in rugby, cricket and boxing; he represented Wanganui at the New Zealand Boxing Championship. He was also successful academically.

When Sir Charles Kingsford Smith visited Wanganui in his 1933 tour with the Southern Cross, he offered paid flights in his aircraft; Deere was one who took up the offer and, from then on, became interested in learning how to fly. After finishing his schooling, Deere worked on a sheep farm before taking up employment as a law clerk. In 1936, through his family doctor, he discovered that the Royal Air Force (RAF) was open to applications from men from the Dominions, reinvigorating his desire to fly. As his father did not approve of his intention to join the RAF, Deere persuaded his mother to sign the necessary application form. He passed the selection board, presided over by Wing Commander Ralph Cochrane, in April 1937 and sailed for England on the Rangitane in September.

== Military career ==
Arriving in London in October 1937, Deere began his flight training with No. 13 Elementary and Reserve Flying Training School at White Waltham. He had failed a medical check owing to high blood pressure, and had to undertake further tests that he passed, the previously high readings being put down to excitement at the prospect of flying.

Deere's flight training went well and he soloed in a de Havilland Tiger Moth trainer aircraft in November 1937. On 9 January 1938 he was granted a short service commission as an acting pilot officer on probation. He then commenced initial officer training at RAF Uxbridge for two weeks before, on 21 January, proceeding to No. 6 Flying Training School at Netheravon in Wiltshire. His prowess at boxing saw Deere selected for the RAF boxing team to tour South Africa but he chose to remain in England to focus on flight training. The aircraft on which the boxing team travelled crashed at Bulawayo, in Rhodesia, killing several of the RAF personnel on board.

In May 1938, Deere was awarded his wings. Selected for Fighter Command, he progressed to flying the Hawker Fury, a biplane fighter, before being posted to No. 54 Squadron three months later. His new squadron, which was based at Hornchurch in Essex, flew Gloster Gladiator fighters. As the entire squadron was on leave at the time of his arrival, for two weeks he was temporarily attached to No. 74 Squadron, which also flew out of Hornchurch. He was assigned to the section commanded by Flight Lieutenant Adolph 'Sailor' Malan, who arranged for him to have some flying time on a Gloster Gauntlet fighter. When Deere began service with No. 54 Squadron he initially performed administrative duties and it was some time before he was given the opportunity to fly his own Gladiator. Much of the squadron's training in peacetime involved formation flying and fighter tactics, but Deere also played rugby for Rosslyn Park, a South London club. Opponents included London Welsh and Old Blues RFC. His rank as a pilot officer was made substantive on 28 October 1938.

No. 54 Squadron began converting to Supermarine Spitfire fighters in early 1939, Deere flying his for the first time on 6 March. Although he enjoyed flying Gladiators, he found the Spitfire to be "marvellous". At one point, as he familiarised himself with the aeroplane, he blacked out as he was climbing at 27,000 feet (8,200 m). When he recovered the Spitfire was diving towards the sea. Pulling out of the dive, he returned to Hornchurch and sought medical attention. It was found that one of Deere's eardrums had burst as a consequence of neglecting to increase his flow of oxygen as he increased his altitude. He was unable to fly until he recovered.

== Second World War ==
On the outbreak of the Second World War, No. 54 Squadron began flying convoy escort patrols and missions aimed at intercepting German reconnaissance aircraft. Within a matter of days, it was involved in the Battle of Barking Creek, when it was one of several squadrons scrambled in pursuit of aircraft detected by radar and two Hawker Hurricane fighters were shot down in a friendly fire incident. At the time, Deere noted the need for improvement in how ground controllers directed the intercepting fighters as he found the volume of directions issued difficult to follow. The squadron also occasionally flew night patrols, which were not popular with pilots as the Spitfire was ill-equipped for this role. On one such patrol Deere, directed by a controller, very nearly flew into a set of barrage balloons over Harwich and then ran into a perimeter fence when landing at a foggy Hornchurch.

=== Battle of France ===
The Battle of France had commenced on 10 May 1940 and saw the gradual retreat of the British Expeditionary Force (BEF) to the French coast at Dunkirk and Calais. With the British squadrons already operating in France struggling to cope, from 16 May, No. 54 Squadron began to provide extra air cover over the Allied positions there. Deere was involved with the first, uneventful, patrol, and over the coming days flew several more such patrols, often two or three a day, across the English Channel to Dunkirk.

On 23 May Deere and Pilot Officer John Allen were detailed to escort Flight Lieutenant James Leathart, flying a Miles Master, a two-seat trainer, over to Calais to rescue No. 74 Squadron's commanding officer, Squadron Leader Laurie White, who had made a forced landing at an airfield there. During this mission, and in sight of Leathart, Deere claimed his first combat victories, shooting down two of several Messerschmitt Bf 109s fighters that had approached while the Magister was still on the airfield. He damaged a third Bf 109 but ran out of ammunition and, with Allen, had to return to England. The mission was a success, for Leathart was able to collect White and fly back to Hornchurch. The action gave Deere an insight into the qualities of the Bf 109, which he considered "in the hands of a good pilot was a tough nut to crack. Initially, it was faster in the dive, but slower in the climb; the Spitfire could out-turn but it was at a disadvantage in manoeuvres that entailed negative G forces [sic]. Overall, there was little to choose between the two fighters."

The following day, while the squadron was flying near Saint-Omer in the Calais region, a formation of Heinkel He 111 medium bombers accompanied by Bf 109s and Messerschmitt Bf 110 heavy fighters was spotted. An attempt to attack the bombers was interrupted by the Bf 109s and during the resulting melee, Deere shot down one of the fighters. On 26 May, with the squadron at 17,000 feet (5,200 m) over Gravelines covering a convoy of ammunition ships, he shot down two Bf 110s. These had disrupted his attempt to intercept some German bombers that were attacking a British destroyer off Calais. His aircraft was badly damaged during this action, part of a wing being shot away.

Operation Dynamo, the British effort to evacuate the BEF from Dunkirk, commenced on 26 May. The RAF now began to tightly cover Dunkirk and the English Channel, protecting the ships of the evacuation fleet as much as possible. Accordingly, No. 54 Squadron would fly several times a day to Dunkirk during the evacuation. On an afternoon patrol on 27 May, Deere destroyed a Junkers Ju 88 medium bomber attacking a hospital ship, and shared in the destruction of another. The next day, Deere led the squadron, now down to eight serviceable aircraft, on its final dawn patrol before it was withdrawn for a rest. Coming across a Dornier Do 17 light bomber, he led a section of his flight in pursuit while the rest the squadron continued with its patrol. In making an attack on the Do 17, his own Spitfire was damaged by machine-gun fire from its rear gunner. This forced him to make an emergency landing on a Belgian beach, during which he was knocked unconscious. After coming to, he made his way on foot to a nearby town where his head injuries were dressed. He hitched a ride on a British Army lorry to Dunkirk, and boarded a boat to Dover, then travelled via London to Hornchurch, where he had taken off some 19 hours earlier. During his boat ride to Dover, he was subject to scathing comments from soldiers about the effectiveness of the RAF's fighter cover.

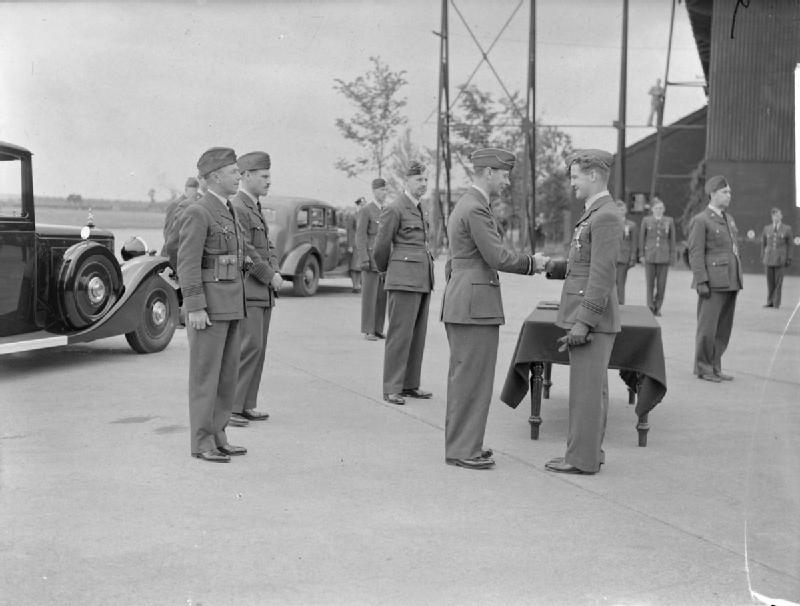
Deere being presented with his DFC by King George VI, 27 June 1940

For its rest, No. 54 Squadron had moved to RAF Catterick in Yorkshire. After ten days of non-stop flying over Dunkirk, it had been depleted in both pilots and aircraft. It returned to Hornchurch on 4 June 1940, with new Spitfires and replacement pilots, and began flying reconnaissance missions to northern France and Belgium. On one such mission in the Abbeville area, Deere and Leathart between them badly damaged a Ju 88, counting it as a probable. Later in the month Deere's award of the Distinguished Flying Cross (DFC) was announced, and was presented to him by King George VI at a ceremony at Hornchurch on 27 June. His citation for the DFC read:

During May 1940, this officer has, in company with his squadron, taken part in numerous offensive patrols over Northern France, and has been engaged in seven combats often against superior numbers of the enemy. In the course of these engagements he has personally shot down five enemy aircraft and assisted in the destruction of others. On one occasion, in company with a second aircraft, he escorted a trainer aircraft to Calais Marck aerodrome, for the purpose of rescuing a squadron commander who had been shot down there. The trainer aircraft was attacked by twelve Messerschmitt 109s whilst taking off at Calais, but Pilot Officer Deere, with the other pilot, immediately attacked, with the result that three enemy aircraft were shot down, and a further three severely damaged. Throughout these engagements this officer has displayed courage and determination in his attacks on the enemy.

— London Gazette, No. 34873, 14 June 1940.

By July 1940, No. 54 Squadron was back to flying convoy and coastal patrols. On the afternoon of 9 July, while leading a patrol between Deal and Dover, a Heinkel He 59 seaplane was sighted along with an escort of several Bf 109s. Ordering one section to pursue the seaplane, Deere took another section to deal with the escort. He shot down one Bf 109 but collided with a second, flown by Oberfeldwebel Johann Illner of Jagdgeschwader 51. As a result of the glancing blow with the Bf 109, the propeller blades of Deere's Spitfire were bent backwards, his cockpit hood partially stove in, the engine disabled, and much of the fin and rudder lost. Already heading inland prior to the collision, he glided to a forced landing in a paddock near Manston, in Kent. The hood, damaged in the collision, proved difficult to open but he was able to escape before his burning aircraft was destroyed by flames. He spent the night at the nearby RAF airbase before returning to Hornchurch the next day. In the meantime, Illner was able to return to France in his own badly damaged aircraft while the He 59 was forced down at Goodwin Sands and its crew taken prisoner.

=== Battle of Britain ===
The first phase of the Battle of Britain commenced on 10 July 1940, when Luftwaffe attacks on targets along the coast of England and on shipping were stepped up in the Kanalkampf (Channel war). These were designed to draw out and destroy RAF Fighter Command, necessary for the proposed invasion of Britain. As part of No. 11 Group, tasked with the defence of southeast England, Deere's squadron was heavily involved.

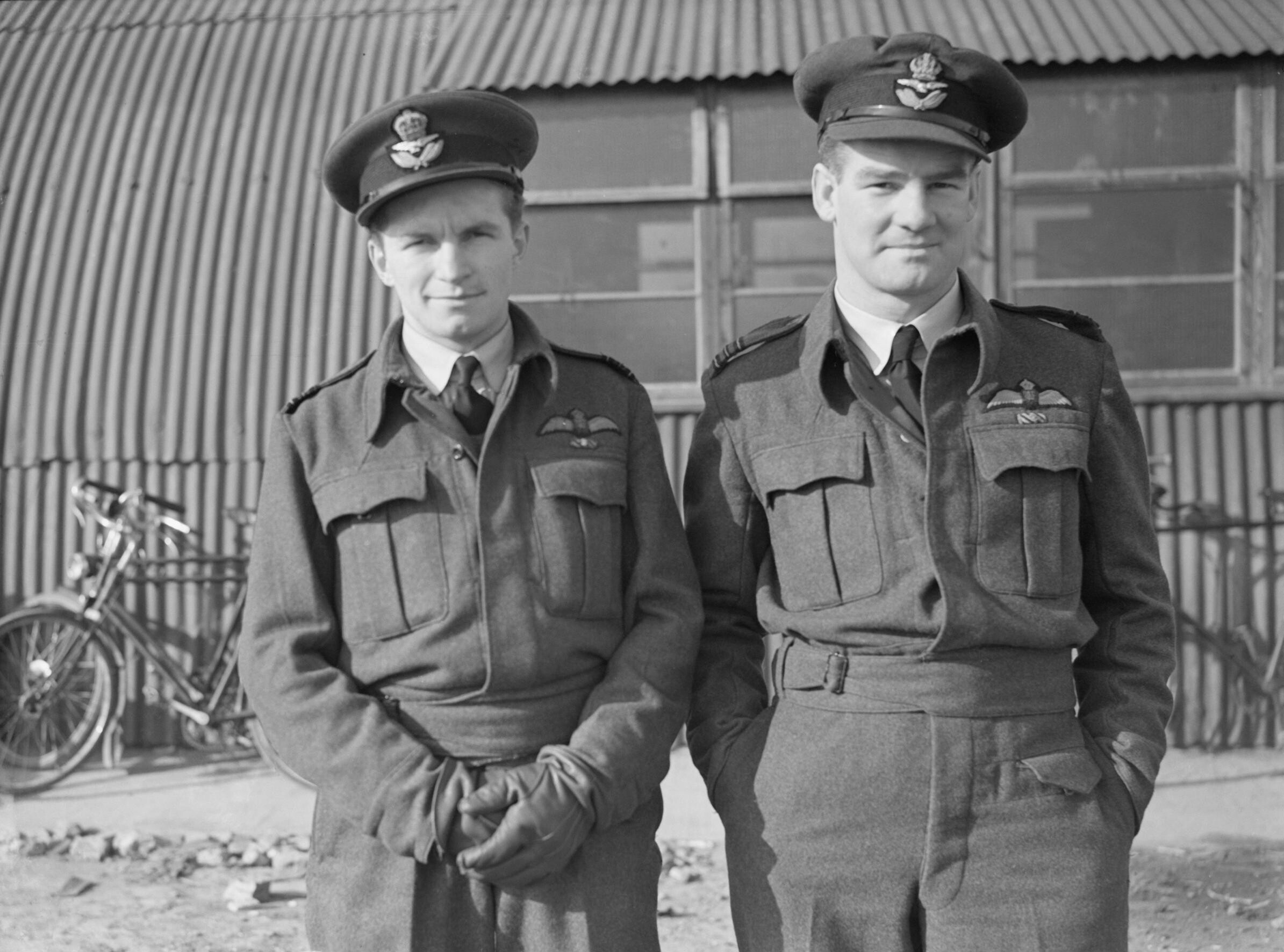
Deere on the right, standing alongside fellow Battle of Britain pilot Denis Crowley-Milling, 1940

Poor weather conditions meant that No. 54 Squadron saw little action until 24 July, when the Luftwaffe mounted several large bombing raids against convoys in the Thames Estuary. Deere and his flight disrupted one raid in the morning. During a second raid at midday that included at least 20 bombers and 30 fighters, he destroyed a Bf 109. This was his first victory of the Battle of Britain; by the end of the action, the squadron had accounted for 16 Bf 109s for the loss of two pilots. A few days later, Deere was promoted to the rank of flying officer and the squadron, having flown more sorties than any other during July, was sent back to Catterick for a rest.

No. 54 Squadron returned to Hornchurch on 8 August 1940 and flew an uneventful patrol later that day. On 12 August, Deere, while leading the squadron, pursued and shot down a Bf 109 that broke up his section's attack on a group of bombers off the Kent coast, near North Foreland. While returning to Hornchurch, he encountered a group of Bf 110s, one of which he shot down. On 15 August, during an attempt by the squadron to intercept a bombing raid they encountered 40 Bf 109s. Deere destroyed one and damaged another. On another interception mission that evening, the squadron engaged a group of Bf 109s escorting Do 17 bombers flying towards London. He pursued one Bf 109 and shot it down over the English Channel. A second was also destroyed, Deere having pursued it inland of the French coast. Heading back to England, he encountered five Bf 109s which attempted to block his flight path. Despite repeated attacks by the Bf 109s, he was able to make the English coast although his Spitfire was badly damaged with its engine on fire. He bailed out at low altitude and, as he exited the cockpit, struck the tailplane and injured his wrist. Initially taken to RAF Kenley, at which time he discovered his watch had been damaged by a German bullet, he was admitted to Victoria Hospital for treatment. He discharged himself the following day and was back on operations on 17 August. A few days later Winston Churchill, the British Prime Minister, paid tribute to the fighter pilots of the RAF in the House of Commons, making his famous "The Few" speech; to a fellow pilot, Deere wryly noted "...he can say that again. There aren't many of us left".

Deere was shot down again on 28 August, this time by a Spitfire in an incidence of friendly fire, but parachuted to safety. He had earlier scored hits on a pair of Bf 109s but, not being able to see either one crash, only claimed one probable. He later conceded that the "strain had almost reached breaking point". His abandoned Spitfire crashed at Boreham, in Essex; its engine and other remnants were recovered in 1973. On 30 August, a quieter day for the squadron with only two patrols, he engaged a Do 17 but was not able to confirm its destruction, and claimed it as a probable.

On 31 August the Luftwaffe raided Hornchurch, which had been caught unawares. No. 54 Squadron was scrambled, Deere leading a section of three Spitfires as they taxied down the runway. The German bombers in the meantime released their ordnance onto the runway. All three aeroplanes of Deere's section were destroyed and his Spitfire was blown on its back, trapping him. With injuries to his scalp, he was extracted by another pilot of his section. Deere was instructed to rest for three days, but disregarded this and started flying again on 2 September. He only had two more days of operations before the squadron moved back to Catterick for yet another period of rest and recovery. Its withdrawal was well overdue as Deere believed it should have happened the previous month. It would play no further role in the Battle of Britain. Since the beginning of 1940, its pilots had accounted for the destruction of at least 92 enemy aircraft.

Shortly after the squadron's return to Yorkshire, Deere's award of a bar to his DFC was announced. The published citation read:

Since the outbreak of war this officer has personally destroyed eleven, and probably one other, enemy aircraft, and assisted in the destruction of two more. In addition to the skill and gallantry he has shown in leading his flight, and in many instances his squadron, Flight Lieutenant Deere has displayed conspicuous bravery and determination in pressing home his attacks against superior numbers of enemy aircraft, often pursuing them across the Channel in order to shoot them down. As a leader he shows outstanding dash and determination.

— London Gazette, No. 34940, 6 September 1940.

No. 54 Squadron remained in Yorkshire for the remainder of 1940, classified as a training unit. Deere was an instructor, involved in practice flights with new pilots and bringing them up to speed with combat tactics. On one such flight in December 1940, he collided with a trainee's aircraft, his Spitfire losing most of its tail and going into a spin. Bailing out with some difficulty due to the centrifugal forces of the spinning aircraft, he became trapped against the remnants of the tailplane. He was finally able to break free as the Spitfire approached the ground but his parachute, which had been damaged, failed to fully open. Deere landed in a pool of farm sewerage that broke much of his fall. As a result of this incident he was rested from active flying.

=== Squadron leader ===
In January 1941 Deere was promoted to acting squadron leader and tasked as an operations room controller at Catterick. Due to weather conditions, flying was limited and No. 54 Squadron shifted back to Hornchurch in February. The squadron's role was now to conduct offensive sweeps, codenamed Rhubarbs, over France. Deere soon tired of his controller duties and sought a return to flying operations. In May 1941, he was posted to No. 602 Squadron, which operated Spitfires from Ayr, in Scotland, as one of its flight commanders. This move saw him return to the rank of flight lieutenant.

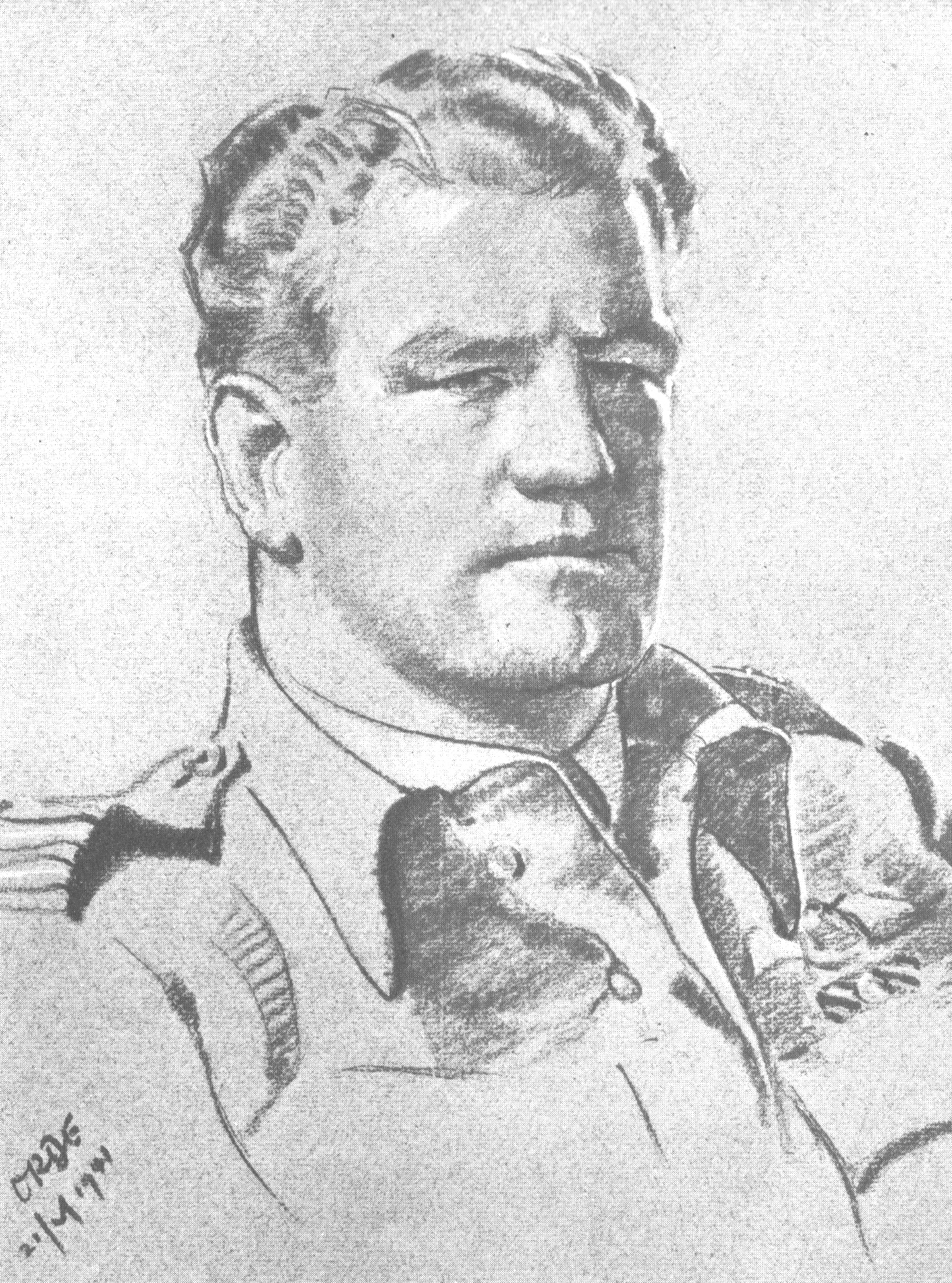
A sketch of Deere, made by Cuthbert Orde, 1941

When Deere arrived at No. 602 Squadron, he was already well known as a fighter ace and for his narrow escapes. On an early practice flight over the North Sea with the squadron, his Spitfire developed engine trouble. He only just made the Scottish coast and crash landed in a potato field, flipping his aircraft onto its back, temporarily trapping him. He was able to wriggle free and make his way back to Ayr. In May 1941, the squadron provided air cover for the battleship HMS Prince of Wales, which was returning to Scotland after its involvement in the Battle of the Denmark Strait.

In July, No. 602 Squadron was transferred to Kenley, operating with No. 452 and 485 Squadrons as part of the fighter wing flying from Kenley. The Kenley wing, as it was known, was to conduct operations over northern France, escorting bombers and carrying out fighter sweeps. Later that month, his rank of flight lieutenant was made substantive, and at the beginning of August, Deere took over the squadron while its regular commander was in hospital. The same day, he claimed a Bf 109 shot down. Although officially credited with this kill, his biographer, Richard Smith, considers it a possibility that this was in fact a friendly fire incident, and the aircraft destroyed may have been a Hurricane of No. 242 Squadron.

On a sweep over Béthune, on 9 August 1941, Deere, unable to see them go down, claimed three Bf 109s as damaged. A fellow pilot noted Deere had a high level of integrity when it came to claiming enemy aircraft shot down. A few days later, while escorting Handley Page Hampden bombers near Lille, his Spitfire was damaged by a Bf 109 that had surprised him. Enemy cannon tore a large hole in his wing and there were over 30 bullet holes through the fuselage. Despite leaking glycol, he was able to cross the English Channel and land at Manston airfield. Deere claimed two more Bf 109s as damaged between September and November 1941, and his rank of flight lieutenant was made permanent. By this time, high losses among fighter pilots and bomber crews saw the RAF reduce its offensive operations to Belgium and France over the winter months.

In January 1942, No. 602 Squadron was taken over by Squadron Leader Brendan Finucane and Deere was sent on a lecturing and public relations trip to America. Arriving in early March, he taught American pilots fighter tactics learnt in the Battle of Britain and the later fighting over France. He was also able to fly American aircraft. After six weeks in the United States, he returned to England. He found that he had been assigned to a staff post in the Far East but preferred to remain in Europe. He arranged a meeting with the commander of No. 11 Group, Air Vice-Marshal Trafford Leigh-Mallory, who gave him command of No. 403 Squadron, of the Royal Canadian Air Force, instead. He took up his command, based at North Weald in Essex, on 30 April.

The morale of No. 403 Squadron was low due to losses earlier in the month, including its former commander, and it had been taken off operations. Deere quickly brought the squadron back to operational status, commencing with an uneventful sweep over the Belgian coastline on 5 May 1942. After further such operations during the rest of the month, the intensity increased in June; on a mission on 2 June, when flying as cover for the North Weald wing, the squadron encountered around 40 to 50 Focke-Wulf Fw 190 fighters and half of its 12 aircraft were lost. Deere used up all his ammunition but the hectic nature of the engagement meant that he was unable to observe whether any of his strikes were successful. Among those lost was Flight Lieutenant Edward Darling, who Deere had personally recruited to the squadron. He mounted a search for Darling, who had been seen to go down in the sea off Calais but no trace of him was found. Due its losses, the squadron moved to Martlesham Heath to carry out convoy patrols and was scheduled for a rest period later in the month. Deere felt this move unnecessary as morale among the remaining pilots remaining high despite the losses of 2 June, and he met with Leigh-Mallory in an attempt to have the squadron remain on operations. To his dismay, he found that Leigh-Mallory held him partially responsible for the losses due to his aggressive leadership and did not rescind his orders for the squadron to have a rest.

From 18 June, No. 403 Squadron was based at Catterick; it was still there in August, performing local patrols and working on practicing formation flying, when Deere was posted to the headquarters of No. 13 Group on staff duties. He was only briefly in this role before he was sent to the RAF Staff College for a three-month course. In late January 1943 he returned to No. 13 Group. Wanting to get back to flying duties, he soon engineered a return to operations for two weeks as a supernumerary with No. 611 Squadron at Biggin Hill. While serving with the squadron, he shot down an Fw 190, on 16 February. When he went back to No. 13 Group, he was surprised with news that he was to be wing leader of the Kenley wing. This posting was changed at the last minute and instead he given command of the fighter wing at Biggin Hill, whose previous commander had just been shot down over the English Channel. He was also promoted to wing commander.

=== Wing leader ===
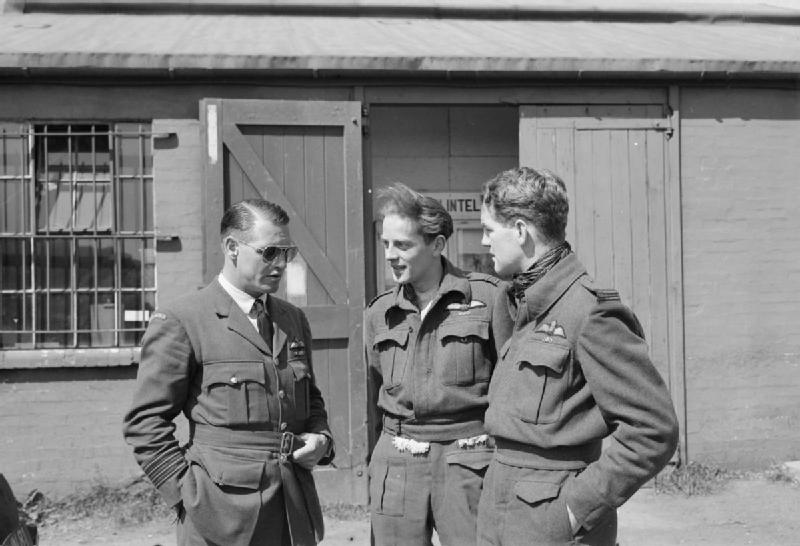
Biggin Hill station commander, Sailor Malan, on the left, with Alan Deere, on the right, 1943

At Biggin Hill, Deere became reacquainted with Sailor Malan, who was the station's commander and had been helpful when Deere was first posted to No. 54 Squadron in 1938. By this stage of the war, Fighter Command's daytime operations were increasingly focused on escorting bombers on raids into France, often operating as two-squadron wings. This meant the fighter pilots needed to learn new operational techniques, which Deere had to impart in his role as wing leader. Malan supported Deere as he introduced new tactics for escorting bombers; in particular, he emphasized the need for independence for squadrons and sections when flying as a wing and to not be tied too closely to the speed of the bombers. The latter had been an issue during the Battle of Britain, for the Luftwaffe's tactics of providing a close escort to bombers meant that fighters lost their advantage of speed. His first operation as wing leader was on 4 April 1943, escorting bombers to Abbeville, but he had to return prematurely when his Spitfire developed engine trouble. Similar missions followed in April and May, during which time the Biggin Hill wing claimed its 1000th victory, on 15 May. On 4 June, Deere's award of the Distinguished Service Order (DSO) was announced, the published citation reading:

This officer has displayed exceptional qualities of skill which have played a large part in the successes of formations he has led. His fearlessness, tenacity and unswerving devotion to duty have inspired all with whom he has flown. Wing Commander Deere has destroyed 18 enemy aircraft.

— London Gazette, No. 36041, 4 June 1943.

Later in June, Deere claimed a damaged Fw 190 during a melee with 50 German fighters as his wing escorted a bombing raid to France. On 23 June he claimed a Fw 190 as destroyed when he forced it into an unrecoverable spin over the Pas de Calais. At the start of July, No. 485 Squadron, which had mainly New Zealand flying personnel, joined the Biggin Hill wing. It was commanded by Squadron Leader Johnny Checketts, who Deere had recommended for the post. Checketts had to twice take over command of the wing as Deere encountered further reliability issues with his aircraft, having to turn back early on two occasions in early July. On 14 July, Deere shot down a Fw 190, claiming it as a probable.

By late September 1943, Deere had become fatigued, not helped by a bout of dysentery. He had lost close friends in recent months; René Mouchotte, the commander of the Free French No. 341 Squadron, which was part of the Biggin Hill wing, had been killed in late August and Checketts was shot down over France in early September although he was to make it back to England seven weeks later with the assistance of the French resistance. Deere had also crashed his Spitfire during a takeoff. After recovering from his illness, Malan took him off flying duties and placed him on leave. During his term as commander of the Biggin Hill wing, Deere had flown on 42 operations and the wing had accounted for sixty enemy aircraft destroyed.

=== Later war experiences ===
While on leave, and in recognition of his leadership of the Biggin Hill wing when it escorted bombers of the Eighth Air Force, Deere was awarded the Distinguished Flying Cross by the United States. On 21 October 1943 he was sent to RAF Sutton Bridge, where he was to be the chief instructor at the Fighter Wing of the Central Gunnery School. In November, he went to Buckingham Palace to be invested with the DSO that he had been awarded earlier in the year.

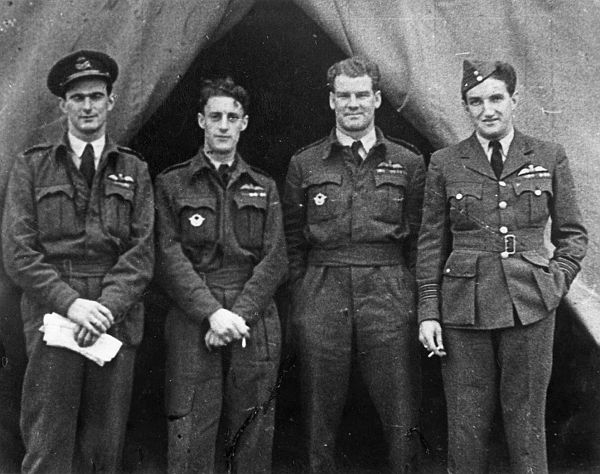
Deere stands third left in this group of New Zealand wing commanders, sometime in 1944. The others, from left to right, are Edward Wells, Colin Gray, and Bill Crawford-Compton

Deere was given a staff role at the headquarters of No. 11 Group in March 1944. Shortly afterwards, he received the Croix de Guerre from the Free French forces, in recognition of his role in leading the French squadrons that were part of the Biggin Hill wing. On 1 May, at the request of the Chief of Staff of the Free French Air Force, Général de division (General) Martial Valin, Deere took command of No. 145 Wing, which comprised two French squadrons operating Spitfires. Part of the 2nd Tactical Air Force, the wing provided air cover over the beaches on D-Day. Deere went with the wing to France when it began operating from continental Europe but in late July he was posted to the headquarters of No. 84 Group. He acted in a co-ordination role, moving with ground forces and calling in air strikes on ground targets. When the war in Europe ended in May 1945, he was at Celle, in Germany, with a joint planning team.

Deere was one of New Zealand's best-known fighter pilots of the war. He was credited with 22 victories, one of which was shared, 10 probables and 18 damaged. Of the several New Zealanders who became aces, he was second only to Colin Gray. Later research by aviation historians Christopher Shores and Clive Williams suggests that he actually destroyed 17 enemy aircraft, with a share in the destruction of one more, plus four probables and a share in another, and seven damaged with one shared.

== Post-war career ==
In July 1945, Deere took over leadership of the Polish P-51 Mustang wing based at Andrew's Field in Essex. This command lasted until October, when the wing was disbanded, and he was appointed commanding officer of RAF Duxford. He also received a permanent commission, as a squadron leader, in the RAF on 1 September 1945, although he continued to retain his acting wartime rank of wing commander. At the end of the year, he was appointed to the Order of the British Empire in recognition of his military service.

In August 1946 Deere commenced a nine-month course on air strategy at the Air University in Alabama. On returning to the United Kingdom in June 1947, he was posted to the staff of Air Headquarters in Malta, commencing in July. He remained in the role for two years, which included a period of leave in New Zealand. Once back in the United Kingdom, he joined the staff of No. 61 Group, based at Kenley. His acting rank of wing commander was made permanent on 1 July 1951, and at the end of the year he took up a post at Fighter Command's No. 11 Group, at the headquarters of its northern sector at RAF Linton-on-Ouse, in North Yorkshire.

Deere returned to his former wartime base at RAF North Weald in May 1952, becoming the station's commander. Part of his work at the station involved organising and supervising the construction of a new control tower. He kept his hand in on flight duties, flying Gloster Meteor jet fighters, including one on a demonstration flight to Hornchurch in 1953 for celebrations of the anniversary of the Battle of Britain. In June 1954 he was posted to West Germany, where he acted as an administrator at the headquarters of the 2nd Tactical Air Force, based at Wildenrath. From March 1957 he began instructing at the RAF Staff College in Bracknell and later that year was promoted to group captain. In between his instructing duties at Bracknell, Deere worked on his autobiography. He had been inspired to do so by his return to Hornchurch a few years previously, which had prompted memories of his wartime service there. This was published by Hodder & Stoughton in 1959 as Nine Lives, a reference to his many close calls, to largely favourable reviews.

Deere's teaching duties at Bracknell ended in late 1959 and, after a short period at Transport Command in a liaison capacity, Deere was assigned to the Air Ministry as Director of Postings. In March 1961, he was appointed aide-de-camp to the Queen, a role he fulfilled until June 1964. By then he was leading Fighter Command's East Anglia sector, having spent the previous year as Assistant Commandant at the RAF College, Cranwell. Promoted to air commodore in July 1964, on 30 January 1965, he was given the honour of leading fellow Battle of Britain fighter pilots in the main funeral cortège for Winston Churchill at St. Paul's Cathedral. When the Fighter Command sectors were disestablished in August 1965, he appointed commandant at the RAF's No. 1 School of Technical Training at RAF Halton. This was his last posting; he retired from the RAF on 12 December 1967.

== Later life and death ==
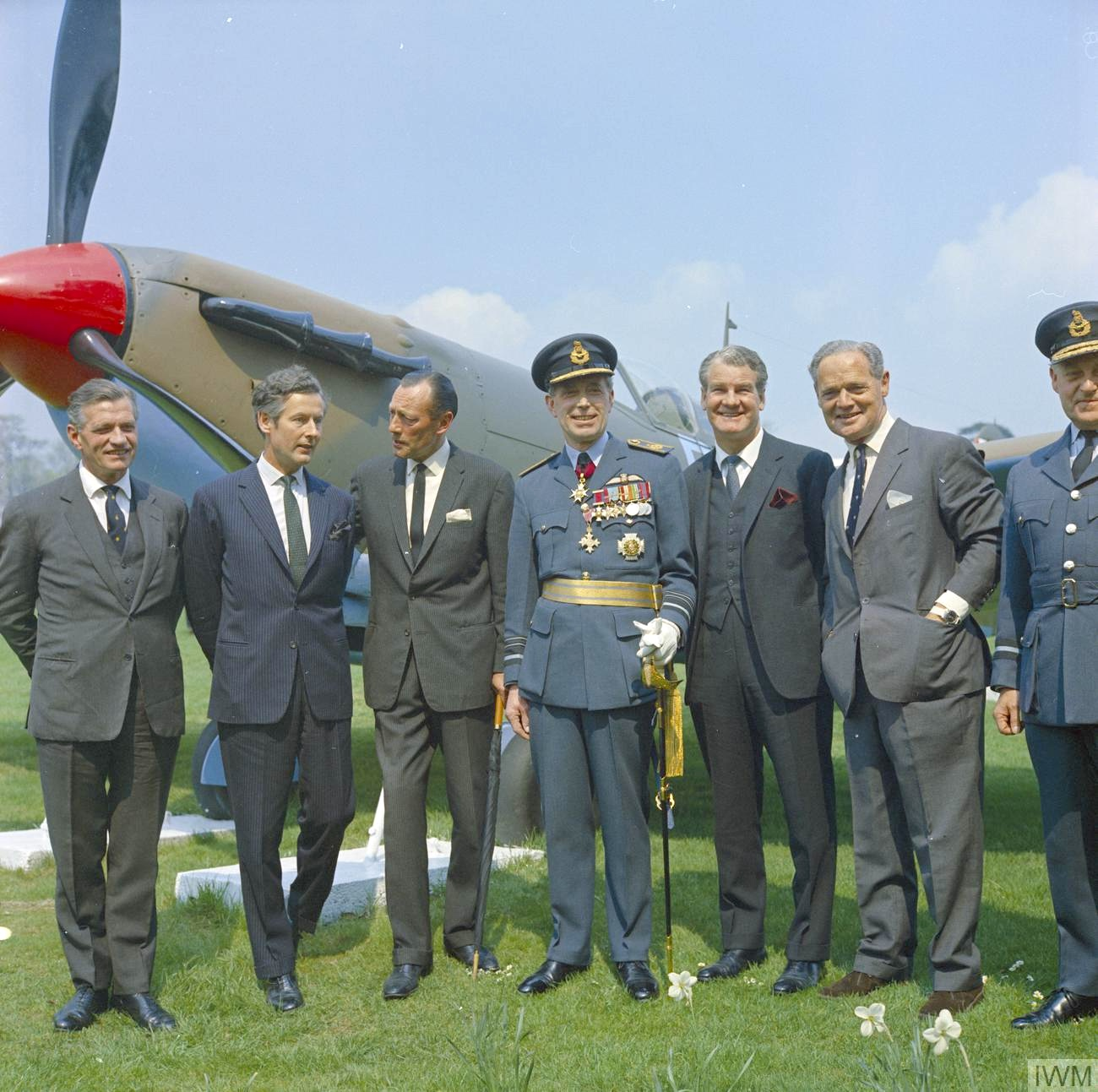
Deere in 1968 with several other World War II aces

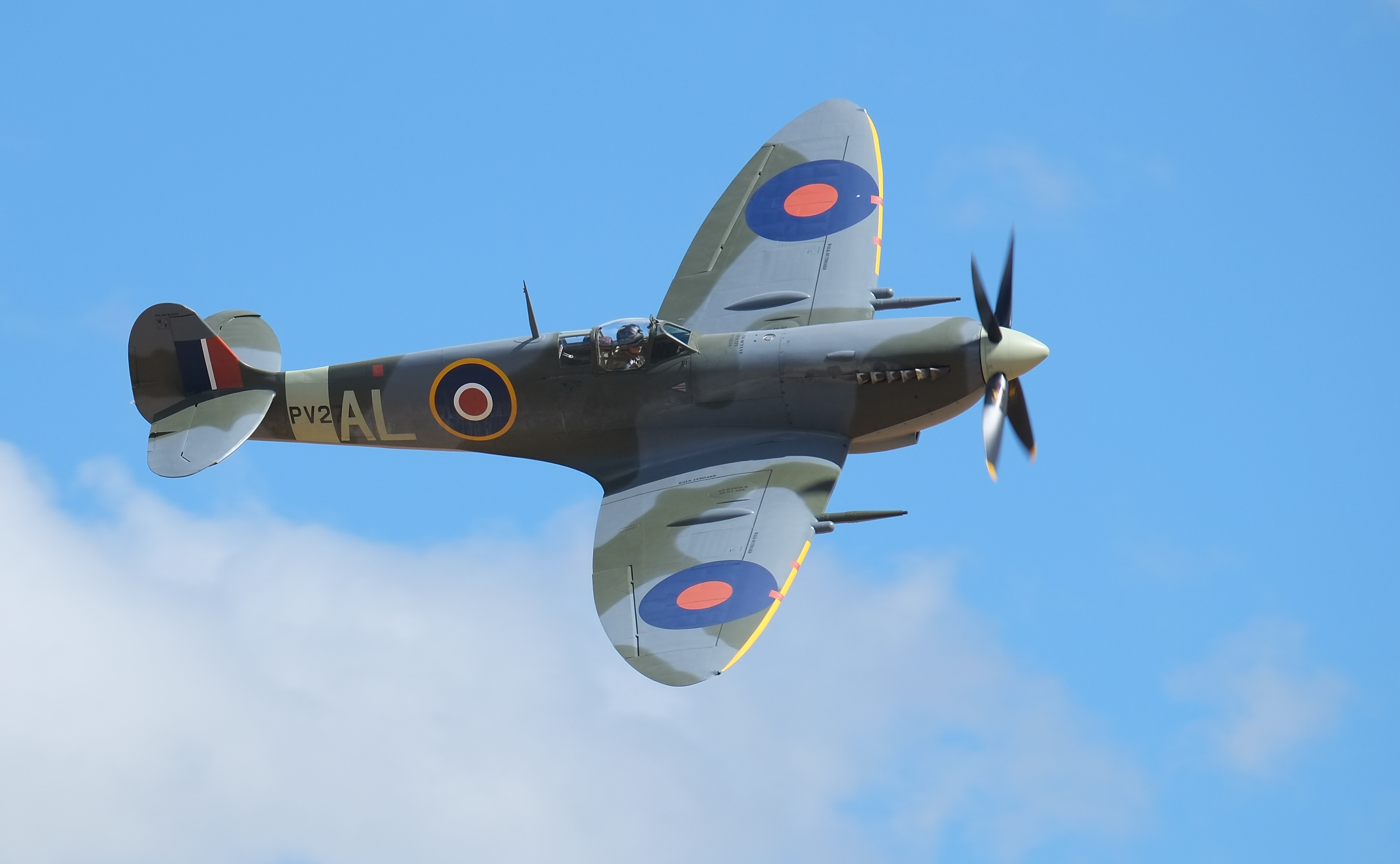
A restored Spitfire IX, bearing Deere's markings as they appeared during his time at Biggin Hill. At this stage of his career, his Spitfire was personalised with his nickname Al, in large letters on the fuselage.

Upon his retirement, Deere immediately took up a civilian position as the RAF's Director of Sport, a role he would hold until December 1972. He also became the chairman of the RAF Rugby Committee, helping to select playing teams. In March 1972, he participated in a This Is Your Life television programme in honour of Douglas Bader, the famous British fighter pilot who flew with false legs; Deere recounted the story of how he flew as an escort to the aircraft delivering a replacement leg for Bader, who had been shot down and was a prisoner of war. In 1990, he was again involved with This Is Your Life, this time a New Zealand version, for his compatriot Checketts, who had flown with him during his days as commander of the Biggin Hill wing. It was to be Deere's last visit to New Zealand.

As a well-known Spitfire pilot, Deere was often called upon by authors of military history and publishers for his reminiscences of the Second World War, particularly in relation to the Battle of Britain and Spitfires. His Nine Lives autobiography was republished in 1991 and he was interviewed for a documentary series on New Zealand in the Second World War. In his later years, he suffered from cancer of the colon, which led to his death, aged 77, on 21 September 1995. He was cremated and his ashes were scattered over the River Thames from a Spitfire. He was survived by his wife Joan née Fenton, whom he had married on 18 September 1945, and their two children.

== Legacy ==
Deere's medals were acquired by the RAF Museum at Hendon, along with his original manuscript for Nine Lives. Other memorabilia associated with him is displayed in the Hornchurch Wing Collection at the Heritage and Military Centre in Purfleet, Essex. The engine of the Spitfire shot from under him on 28 August 1940 is displayed at the Kent Battle of Britain Museum. In New Zealand, the Air Force Museum of New Zealand holds one of his boxing trophies, donated by his wife. A nephew, Brendon Deere, from 2001 to 2009 restored a Spitfire Mk IX back to flying status. This aircraft is presented in the markings of Deere's aircraft as it would have appeared when he was a wing commander at Biggin Hill in June 1943.
