= Colin Falkland Gray =

Royal air force officer and New Zealand fighter ace in World War II

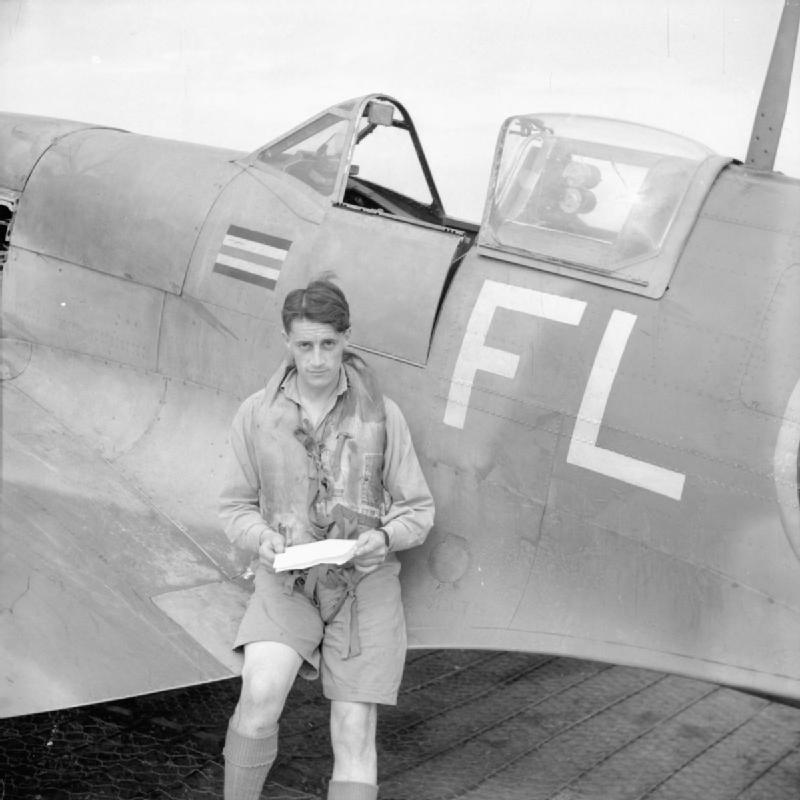
- Gray, pictured during his time in command of No. 81 Squadron
- Born: 9 November 1914; Christchurch, New Zealand
- Died: 1 August 1995 (aged 80); Porirua, New Zealand
- Military career
- Allegiance: United Kingdom
- Branch: Royal Air Force
- Service years: 1939–1961
- Rank: Group Captain
- Commands: RAF Church Fenton (1954–56); Lympne Wing (1944); No. 322 Wing (1943); No. 81 Squadron (1943); No. 64 Squadron (1942); No. 616 Squadron (1941–42)
- Conflicts: Second World War; Battle of France; Battle of Britain; Circus offensive; Tunisian campaign; Allied invasion of Sicily; Battle of Arnhem; Malayan Emergency
- Awards: Distinguished Service Order; Distinguished Flying Cross & Two Bars
- Other work: Personnel Director at Unilever

Group Captain Colin Falkland Gray, DSO, DFC & Two Bars (9 November 1914 – 1 August 1995) was a Royal Air Force (RAF) officer and the top New Zealand fighter ace of the Second World War. He was credited with at least 27 aerial victories.

Born in Christchurch, Gray was accepted into the RAF in 1939 on a short service commission, after two previous attempts failed on medical grounds. He flew with No. 54 Squadron during the Battle of France. His twin brother Ken, who had also joined the RAF and was a bomber pilot, was killed in a flying accident at this time. He flew extensively for the majority of the Battle of Britain and by September 1940, he had shot down 14 German aircraft and had been awarded the Distinguished Flying Cross (DFC). He fulfilled a training role for the next few months before returning to offensive operations in early 1941.

Gray commanded No. 616 Squadron during the Circus offensive and was awarded a Bar to his DFC before being sent to the Mediterranean theatre of operations to lead No. 64 Squadron. By 1943 he was a wing commander and flew a number of operations in the North African and Italian Campaigns and by the end of the year he had been awarded the Distinguished Service Order. A return to Europe followed and in September 1944, he commanded a wing supporting the airborne operations of the Battle of Arnhem. After the war he held a number of staff and command positions in the RAF before his eventual retirement in 1961. He returned to New Zealand to work for Unilever. He died in 1995 at the age of 80.

== Early life ==
Colin Falkland Gray and his twin brother Kenneth (known as Ken) were born in Christchurch, New Zealand, on 9 November 1914, the sons of an electrical engineer, Robert Leonard Gray, and his wife, Margaret née Langford. He attended several different schools, including two years at Christ's College in Christchurch, a year at Wellesley College in Wellington, before finishing his formal education at Napier Boys' High School in Napier. He then gained employment as a clerk in 1933, working at a livestock company in Napier. In April 1937, Gray and his brother applied for a short service commission in the Royal Air Force (RAF). While Ken was accepted, Colin was rejected for health reasons; he was suffering influenza at the time of his medical examination.

Gray then applied to join the Civilian Reserve of Pilots but was again rejected on medical grounds. Disregarding advice that he would unlikely to ever be deemed fit enough to serve in the RAF on account of osteomyelitis of a leg bone and being prone to conjunctivitis, Gray took up sheep mustering to improve his fitness. In September 1938 he passed a medical check and was subsequently accepted for a short service commission in the RAF. He had the opportunity to train with the Royal New Zealand Air Force (RNZAF) but opted to go to the United Kingdom. His flight training commenced in early 1939 at No. 1 Elementary Flying Training School at Hatfield in Hertfordshire. He was posted to No. 11 Flying Training School in April, gained his wings in July, and graduated from advanced training in October as a probationary pilot officer in October 1939.

== Second World War ==
With the Second World War underway, Gray was posted to No. 54 Squadron, at the time equipped with Supermarine Spitfire fighters and based at Hornchurch, in November 1939. Another pilot at the squadron was fellow New Zealander Alan Deere, who would go on to have a notable career with the RAF during the war. During the early months of the war, the squadron alternated between Hornchurch and Rochford, carrying out patrols and being scrambled to intercept Luftwaffe aircraft. He was confirmed in his rank of pilot officer on 17 January 1940. Meanwhile, his brother Ken was a bomber pilot flying Armstrong Whitworth Whitleys. He was flying south from his squadron's base in Scotland to visit Colin but was killed when his aircraft flew into a hill on 1 May 1940. The death of Ken greatly affected Colin's morale.

=== Battle of France ===
As the situation in France deteriorated after the German invasion, No. 54 Squadron began patrolling over Calais and Dunkirk. Gray flew his first sortie in the area on 16 May and first encountered the Luftwaffe on 24 May, when he engaged a pair of Messerschmitt Bf 109 fighters. Firing at both, he claimed one as a probable and the other as a possible. Gray achieved his first confirmed enemy aircraft, a Bf 109, the next day while escorting a formation of Fairey Swordfish to dive-bomb Gravelines. His Spitfire received numerous cannon strikes in the engagement, and damage to the port aileron forced the aircraft into a dive that was controlled only with great difficulty. His aircraft had also lost its airspeed indicator and control of guns, flaps and brakes. Despite this damage, Gray managed to land safely at Hornchurch.

With the pilots of the squadron exhausted after extensive operations over Dunkirk, it was withdrawn to Catterick in Yorkshire for a short rest. It returned to Hornchurch on 4 June and spent most of the month flying reconnaissance patrols into France and Belgium, monitoring the activities of the Germans. From 25 June, No. 54 Squadron started operating from Rochford and on 3 July, Gray engaged a Dornier Do 215 of 9./KG 77, claiming it as a probable.

=== Battle of Britain ===
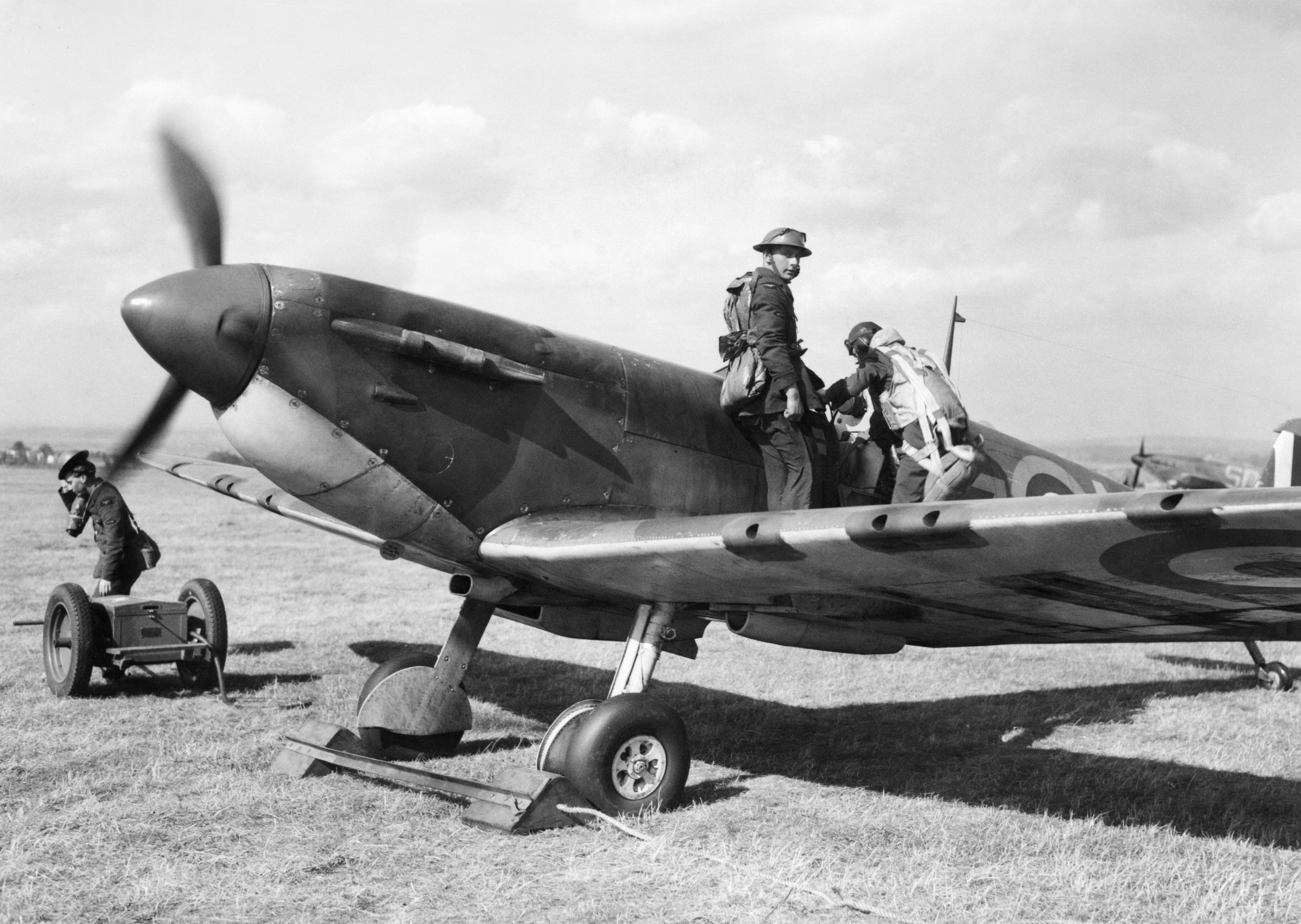
A Spitfire Mk I being readied for a sortie during the Battle of Britain

The first phase of the Battle of Britain commenced on 10 July 1940, when Luftwaffe attacks on targets along the coast of England and on shipping were stepped up in the Kanalkampf (Channel war). These were designed to draw out and destroy RAF Fighter Command, necessary for the proposed invasion of Britain. As part of No. 11 Group, which had been given the task of defending South Eastern England, Gray's squadron was heavily involved in the Battle of Britain.

On 13 July Gray shot down a Bf 109 near Calais having pursued it across the English Channel. A week and a half later, No. 54 Squadron intercepted a group of bombers escorted by 30 Bf 109s. Targeting the fighters, Gray shot down one Bf 109 and then a second. He observed the latter's pilot bailing out into the Channel and swimming for a dinghy. He radioed the man's position, but the pilot did not survive the water conditions. The next day, 25 July, he claimed a probable Bf 109 that was escorting a group of Junkers Ju 87 dive bombers attacking a convoy off Dover. On 26 July, No. 54 Squadron went back to Catterick for a rest, having flown more operations than any other in No. 11 Group; Gray had flown 68 sorties in July.

Gray's squadron reentered the Battle of Britain on 8 August, operating again from Hornchurch. He soon added to his tally of victories, shooting down a pair of Bf 109s on 12 August, one near Dover and the other over Cap Gris-Nez, where it crashed onto a beach. He repeated the feat just a few days later when, on 16 August, he destroyed two Bf 109s of JG 54 during a dogfight over Dover. On the morning of 18 August, he shared in the destruction of a Messerschmitt Bf 110 heavy fighter and damaged a Dornier Do 17 bomber on a second sortie. On his third patrol of the day, he shot down another Bf 110 over Clacton, the enemy aircraft crashing onto the nearby beach. On 24 August, he shot down a further Bf 110 which he had encountered over Dover. Although he expended all his ammunition, the enemy aircraft was severely damaged with one crew member bailing out over the Channel and the aircraft itself, with Gray following at a distance, crashing into the sea off Cap Gris-Nez. He destroyed a Bf 109 on 25 August near Dover. His award of the Distinguished Flying Cross (DFC) was announced two days later, the published citation for his DFC reading:

Since May, 1940, Pilot Officer Gray has flown continuously with his squadron on offensive patrols. He took part in numerous engagements against the enemy throughout the Dunkirk operations, and subsequently throughout intensive air operations over the Kentish coast and in protection of shipping in the Channel. He has shot down four Messerschmitt 109's and, it is believed destroyed a further four. He also assisted in destroying one Messerschmitt 109 and one Dornier 215. His example, courage and determination in action have contributed materially in maintaining the high morale of his squadron.

— London Gazette, No. 34932, 27 August 1940.

Two Bf 109s were damaged on 28 August, and in another sortie the same day, he damaged a Do 17. On the last day of the month, he downed another Bf 109, this time near Maidstone. Gray was in the area again the following day when he engaged three Heinkel He 111 bombers. With one of the He 111s having both its engines set ablaze by Gray's machine gun fire, he dove away out of ammunition but found his Spitfire had been damaged and his ailerons were inoperative. Despite this, he was able to land back at Hornchurch. Flying another Spitfire the same day, he had to make a forced landing when his engine was damaged following an encounter with Bf 109s over Biggin Hill. He flew five sorties on 2 September; he shot down a Bf 109 in the morning although his own aircraft received damage. He took to another Spitfire for his remaining sorties of the day, and destroyed a Bf 110 that was escorting bombers raiding Hornchurch.

The following day, Gray shared in the destruction of a Bf 110 that was part of a raid on North Weald. Later in the day he shot down a Bf 109. This was his last engagement of the battle for at the end of the day, No. 54 Squadron flew north to rest and re-equip. Badly fatigued, he had flown over 60 sorties in August and encountered enemy aircraft on at least 16 occasions, and for the three days of September until his squadron's shift north, recorded 13 sorties. Alan Deere noted that at this time Gray was "noticeably more hollow-cheeked" in appearance. At this stage of the war, Gray had accounted for 14½ enemy aircraft destroyed and was one of only four pilots who had been with the squadron when it began operating from Hornchurch in May.

Based back at Catterick, No. 54 Squadron was deemed to be unsuitable for a return to operations and was placed in reserve. It fulfilled a training role with Gray teaching new pilots in aerial warfare. He was promoted to flying officer on 23 October and two months later was posted to No. 43 Squadron, which was also in reserve and equipped with Hawker Hurricanes. Although he considered the Hurricane nice to fly, he did prefer the Spitfire. He continued to train pilots sent from Operational Training Units until mid-January 1941, when he returned to No. 54 Squadron as one of its flight commanders.

=== Circus offensive ===
By late February, No. 54 Squadron was back at Hornchurch and was involved in the RAF's Circus offensive, carrying out offensive patrols and bomber escort missions to France. In the middle of the year, Gray was posted to No. 1 Squadron, which operated Hurricanes. He was the commander of one of the squadron's flights. One of the first sorties after his arrival involved escorting Westland Lysanders that were carrying out air-sea rescues in the English Channel, during which they encountered a Heinkel He 59 seaplane escorted by Bf 109s. Gray and another pilot shot down the He 59 and three Bf 109s were destroyed by others in the squadron. In July, No. 1 Squadron began operating from Tangmere, where its duties involved the protection of Allied shipping but it was also engaged in training for night interceptions. Gray was promoted to flight lieutenant in August 1941. The same month, he flew at least one operation with No. 41 Squadron to Le Havre, shooting down a Bf 109 on 22 August. In September, he was awarded a Bar to his DFC. The published citation read:

"This officer has destroyed a further eight enemy aircraft bringing his total victories to seventeen. In addition he has probably destroyed a further nine enemy aircraft. Flight Lieutenant Gray has always shown the greatest keenness and enthusiasm and has been of great assistance to his squadron commander."

— London Gazette, No. 35291, 30 September 1941.

At the end of September, Gray was promoted to acting squadron leader and posted to No. 616 Squadron, to serve as its commander. This unit was based at Westhampnett as part of the Tangmere Wing, and operated Spitfire Vbs on daylight operations into occupied France. It soon shifted to north and switched to a patrol role, monitoring the east coast of England until early 1942, when it moved to Kings Cliffe. Shortly afterwards, Gray relinquished command to take up a staff posting at No. 9 Group, advising on fighter tactics.

Returning to operations in September 1942, Gray spent a short period of time at No. 485 Squadron, largely made up of New Zealand flying personnel, before taking command of No. 64 Squadron. This operated the latest model of Spitfire, the Mk IX, from Hornchurch across the English Channel and France. Its work included escorting the early bombing raids carried out by Boeing B-17 Flying Fortresses of the United States Eighth Air Force.

=== Mediterranean ===
At the end of 1942, Gray was posted to the Mediterranean theatre of operations. Reporting to No. 333 Group in January 1943 he was sent to Gibraltar to take command of No. 81 Squadron. Normally based in Algeria, the squadron's flying personnel were on the island to collect the first Spitfire Mk. IXs sent to the theatre. No. 81 Squadron flew across the Mediterranean back to Algeria towards the end of the month. Gray soon encountered the enemy; flying from Bone on 31 January 1, he led a group of Spitfires in an interception of a raid on Cap Negro. Three Bf 109s were shot down in this engagement. Although he made no official claim for this encounter, according to his memoir he did destroy one of three Bf 109s although gave the credit for it to his wingman. He claimed a Bf 109 as probably destroyed on 22 February and followed this up with another Bf 109 reported as damaged a few days later. With another pilot, he claimed a shared probable, a Bf 109, on 2 March.

No. 81 Squadron moved to Souk-el-Khemis Airfield in mid-March and a week later Gray shot down a Macchi C.202 fighter. This was followed by a Bf 109 two days later. At the end of the month, he shot down another Bf 109, observing its pilot bail out after he scored hits at the wing root of the enemy aircraft. At the time, it was reported that his victim was the German flying ace Friedrich-Karl "Tutti" Müller but in fact it was another pilot with the same surname. Early the following month, soon after the squadron had taken off for a patrol, the engine of Gray's Spitfire began running roughly. He turned back to the airfield which, since his departure, had been raided by a group of eight Focke-Wulf Fw 190 fighter-bombers. Despite his engine issues, he pursued the Fw 190s but was unable to catch up. Giving up the chase, he returned to the airfield but then encountered and shot down a Bf 109.

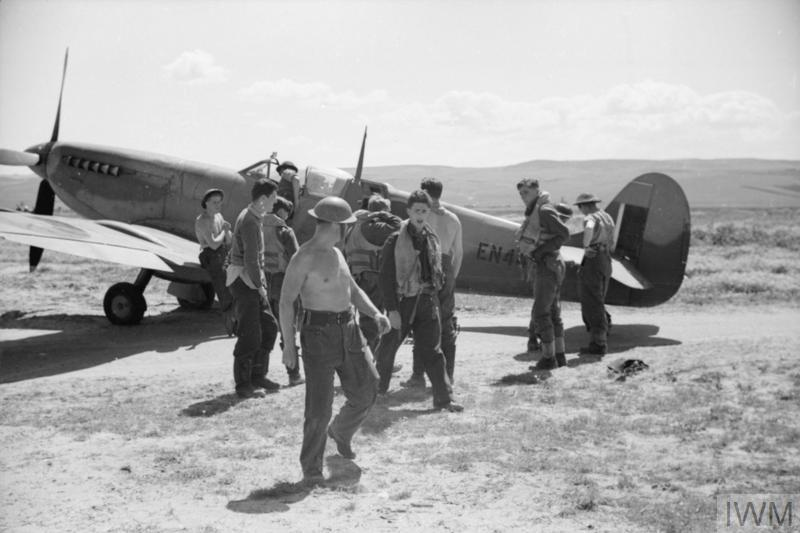
Gray, centre, wearing a Mae West lifejacket, after landing his Spitfire at Souk el Khemis, Tunisia, having just shot down his 20th enemy aircraft

On 18 April, during a sweep over Tunis, Gray claimed a Bf 109 as a probable and had a share in the destruction of another Bf 109 two days later, a fellow pilot confirming the crash of the enemy aircraft. He destroyed a second Bf 109 over Tunis later the same day. Two more Bf 109s were destroyed later in the month. The campaign in North Africa ended the following month. For his leadership and actions during his period of service in North Africa, Gray was awarded the Distinguished Service Order (DSO). The citation, published on 1 June 1943 in the London Gazette, read:

"Squadron Leader Gray is a first class fighter, whose personal example has fostered a fine fighting spirit in the squadron. He has taken part in many sorties in operations in North Africa and has destroyed 5 enemy aircraft, bringing his total victories to at least 21. His gallant leadership has been inspiring."

— London Gazette, No. 36036, 1 June 1943.

Gray was promoted to acting wing commander on 1 June and took over the leadership of No. 322 Wing, which at the time was based at Takali, on the island of Malta. The wing conducted offensive patrols and escorted bombers over the Italian coast. There was only occasional opposition from by the Luftwaffe. Gray shot down a Bf 109 on 14 June and this was followed by a C.202 a few days afterwards. On 1 July the wing flew in support of the Allied invasion of Sicily. That day, several Bf 109s ambushed the wing but Gray was able to shoot down one of the attacking fighters. No. 322 Wing moved to Lentini, on Sicily, towards the end of July. On 25 July 1943, he led 33 Spitfires of No. 322 Wing on a sweep to try and intercept Luftwaffe attempts to land supplies to the German ground forces near Milazzo. They encountered a large group of Junkers Ju 52 transports. Catching the escorting Bf 109s unawares, the Spitfires dived on the Ju 52s. At least 20 of the transports, many loaded with petrol, were destroyed, with Gray accounting for two of them, his last successes of the war. Four Bf 109s had also been destroyed by the Spitfires.

=== Return to Europe ===
Gray's acting rank of squadron leader was made substantive on 1 September 1943 and shortly afterwards he relinquished command of No. 322 Wing and was sent to Cairo to take up special duties at the headquarters of RAF Middle East Command. In October, he returned to England and took up a staff post with No. 9 Group headquarters before taking command of No. 2 Combat Training Wing, based at Balado Bridge in Scotland. He was presented with his DSO by King George VI at Buckingham Palace on 9 November. Alan Deere, Gray's compatriot from his days at No. 54 Squadron, was present at the investiture as he was also receiving a DSO. At the same time, an award of a second Bar to Gray's DFC was announced. Gray only found out about this award when he read about it in a newspaper a few days later.

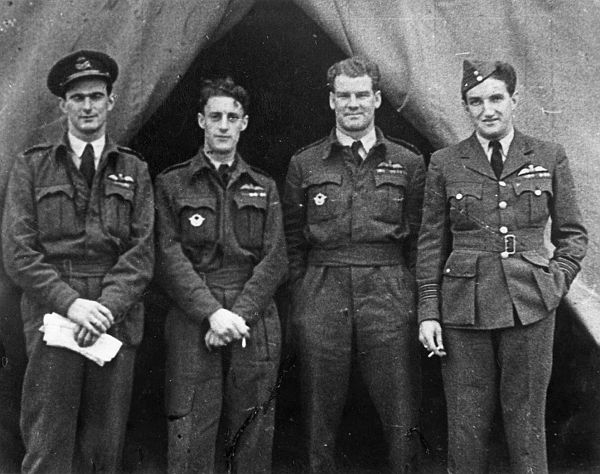
Gray stands second left in this group of New Zealand wing commanders, sometime in 1944. The others, from left to right, are Edward Wells, Alan Deere, and Bill Crawford-Compton

At the end of 1943, Gray was moved to another training role, this time with No. 61 Operational Training Unit at Rednal. He remained here until June 1944, when he became commander of the Spitfire Wing at the Fighter Leader's School based at Millfield. Within a few months, he was appointed commander of the Lympne Wing, which carried out offensive operations and escort missions to France and the occupied Netherlands. In September his wing supported the airborne operations during the Battle of Arnhem. The next month he returned to Buckingham Palace to be presented with the second DFC Bar that he had been awarded the previous November.

In January 1945, Gray attended a senior commander's course at RAF Cranwell before taking command of the RAF station at Skeabrae in the Orkney Islands. According to Gray in his memoirs, the main role of the Spitfire squadron based there was to protect the Royal Navy base at Scapa Flow. In April, his commission in the RAF was made permanent, with Gray holding the rank of squadron leader.

Gray finished the war with 27 confirmed German and Italian aircraft destroyed, shares in 2 others destroyed, 10 probably destroyed, 4 of which were shared with other pilots, and 12 damaged. He was the top New Zealand flying ace of the Second World War.

== Post-war ==
Gray returned to New Zealand on secondment to the RNZAF in July 1945 for several months although most of this period was spent on leave. His active duty in New Zealand primarily involved giving talks to units of the Air Training Corps. Back in England by March 1946 after the end of his secondment, Gray was promoted to acting wing commander, which was made substantive the following year, and posted to the Air Ministry to serve in the Directorate of Accidents Prevention. Then, after attending a course at the RAF Staff College at Bracknell, he served in the Directorate of Air Foreign Liaison.

In January 1950, Gray was sent to Washington, D.C. as an air liaison officer to the Joint Services Mission United States. In this role, he supervised the exchange program between the RAF and United States Air Force. He returned to the United Kingdom in September 1952, and after a period of time in an administrative role at a Gloster Meteor conversion unit at Stradishall, he commanded Church Fenton in Yorkshire from March 1954 to April 1956, during which time he was promoted to group captain.

He was then posted to the headquarters of the Far East Air Force in Singapore. During the Malayan Emergency, he served as a staff officer with responsibility for aerial operations. He returned to the Air Ministry in early 1959 to take up a position under the assistant chief of air staff as deputy director at Fighter Operations. By now he was considering a return to New Zealand for family reasons and he subsequently retired from the RAF in March 1961.

== Later life ==
Gray returned to New Zealand to work for Unilever in Petone as its personnel director until 1979, at which time he retired. He settled in Waikanae and in his later years, he wrote Spitfire Patrol, an autobiography detailing his time in the RAF and which was published in 1990. The same year, he returned to the United Kingdom for the fifty year anniversary celebrations of the Battle of Britain and formed part of the escort for the Roll of Honour in Westminster Abbey.

He died in Kenepuru Hospital, Porirua, on 1 August 1995, survived by his wife, Betty, whom he had married in October 1945, and his four children and a stepdaughter. His remains were cremated at Whenua Tapu crematorium, and his ashes interred in the RSA section at Waikanae Cemetery along with his wife Betty, who died in 2013.
