= Johnny Checketts =

New Zealand flying ace (1912–2006)

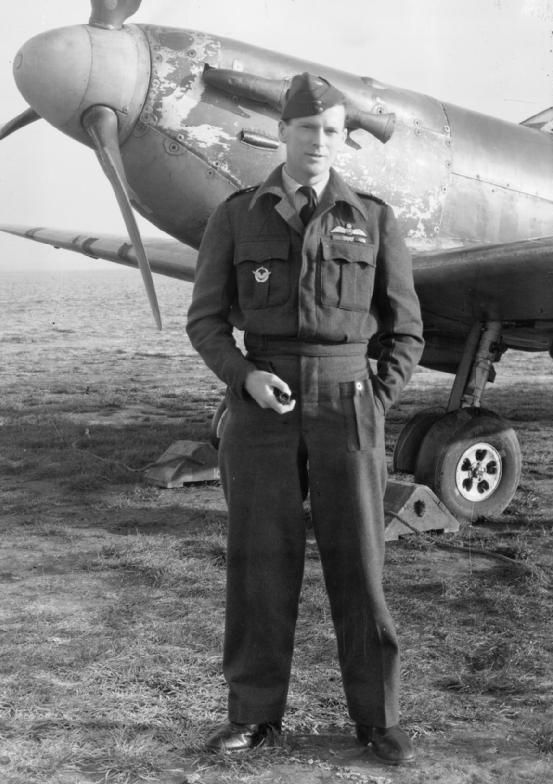
- Checketts in November 1943, when he commanded the Air-to-Air Combat Squadron of the Central Gunnery School at Sutton Bridge, Lincolnshire.
- Born: 20 February 1912; Invercargill, New Zealand
- Died: 21 April 2006 (aged 94); Christchurch, New Zealand
- Military career
- Allegiance: New Zealand
- Branch: Royal New Zealand Air Force
- Service years: 1940–1955
- Rank: Wing Commander
- Nickname: Johnny
- Commands: RNZAF Taieri Station; RNZAF Laucala Bay; Horne Wing; No. 1 Squadron RAF; No. 485 (New Zealand) Squadron
- Conflicts: Second World War
- Awards: Distinguished Service Order; Distinguished Flying Cross; Silver Star (United States); Cross of Valour (Poland)

John Milne Checketts, DSO, DFC (20 February 1912 – 21 April 2006) was a New Zealand flying ace of the Second World War, who was credited with the destruction of 14 1/2 enemy aircraft, three probably destroyed and 11 damaged.

Born in Invercargill, Checketts worked as a mechanic before joining the Royal New Zealand Air Force (RNZAF) in October 1940. After completing his flight training he was sent to the United Kingdom to serve with the Royal Air Force. From January 1942, he flew with No. 485 (NZ) Squadron before being posted to No. 611 Squadron. He returned to No. 485 Squadron in August 1943 as its commander but two months later was shot down over occupied France. He was returned to the United Kingdom by the French Resistance. He later commanded a wing carrying out operations in support of the D-Day landings and escorting heavy bombers on raids into Germany.

Checketts remained in the RNZAF after the war, commanding air bases in New Zealand and Fiji. Returning to civilian life in 1954, he set up an aerial topdressing company and later undertook conservation work. He died in 2006, aged 94.

== Early life ==
John Milne Checketts was born in Invercargill on 20 February 1912, the first of three children, to Ernest and Mary Jane Checketts. His father was a carrier, transporting loads around Southland, and he also kept animals. Checketts was educated at the Invercargill South School and then Southland Technical College, where he studied engineering. He graduated in 1928 but continued to study engineering at night school while undertaking an apprenticeship as a motor mechanic.

Finishing his apprenticeship in 1934, Checketts began working for a motor dealership. His father, who had moved the family to a small farm in 1918, had lost his job and Checkett's wages supplemented the family's income. He was interested in aviation; he had seen his first aeroplane, an Avro 504K, when he was eight years old, and was among the crowd that greeted Charles Kingsford Smith when Smith arrived at Invercargill's Myross Bush aerodrome in the Southern Cross. Checketts took his first flight in late 1937 or early 1938, as a passenger in a de Havilland Puss Moth.

In August 1939, Checketts enrolled in the Civil Reserve for the Royal New Zealand Air Force (RNZAF). Wishing to serve as a pilot rather than the RNZAF's preference for a ground mechanic given his technical background, he took evening classes in educational and technical subjects such as algebra, navigation, electricity and Morse code.

== Second World War ==
=== Training in New Zealand ===
In October 1940, with the Second World War well underway, Checketts was called up to the RNZAF. He underwent flight training at No. 1 Elementary Flying Training School, near Dunedin, soloing on 17 December 1940 in a Tiger Moth. Rated a below-average pilot, he nonetheless went on to No. 1 Service Flying Training School at Wigram, near Christchurch, and then progressed to the Advanced Training School, also at Wigram, after passing his wings examination.

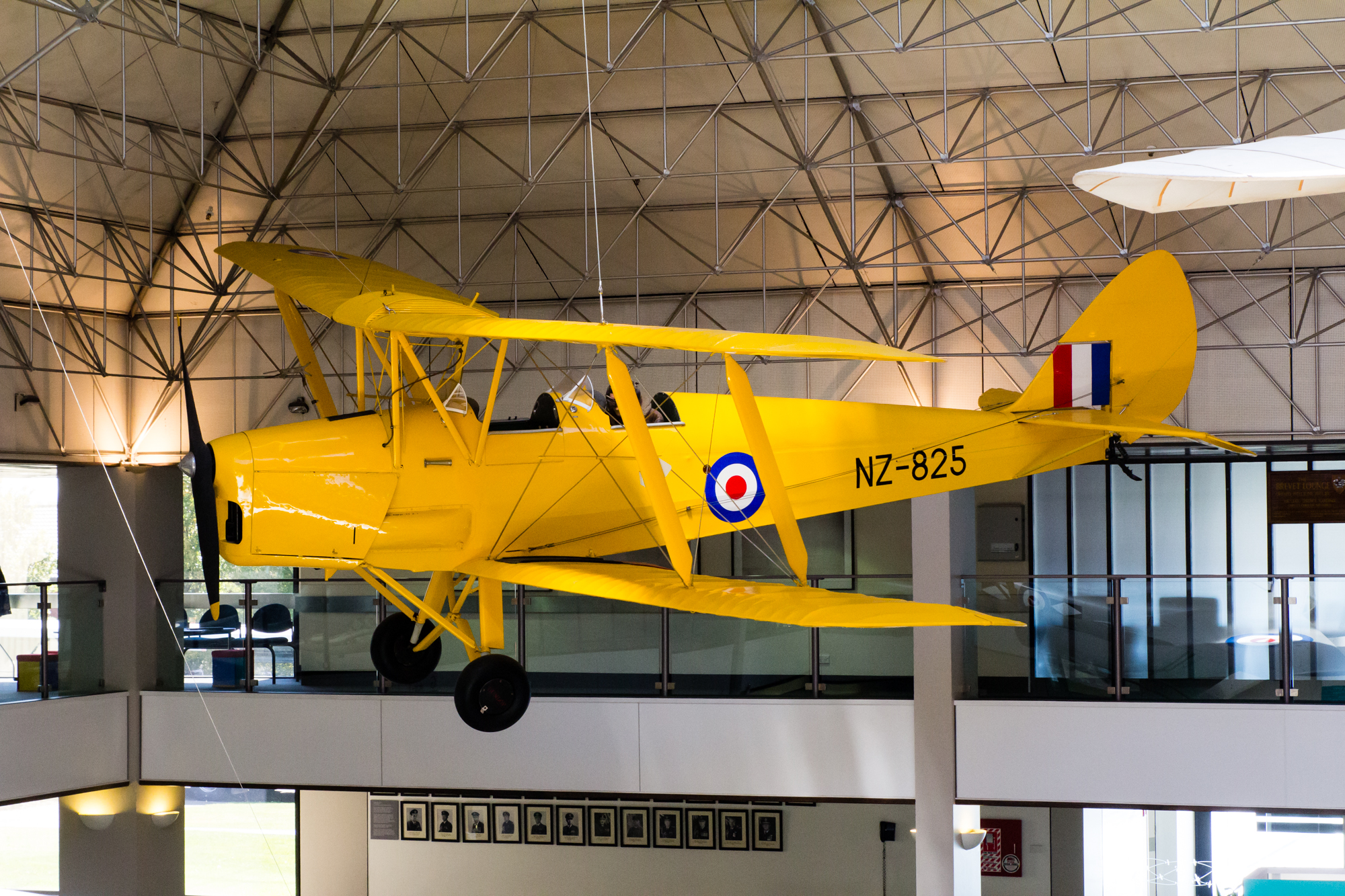
Checketts soloed on a Tiger Moth, shown here in RNZAF colours

Checketts completed his flight training in June 1941 and was commissioned as a pilot officer in the RNZAF. He was posted to the United Kingdom to serve with the Royal Air Force (RAF). He departed from Auckland on 22 July 1941 aboard the Dominion Monarch.

=== Operations ===
At the RAF's No. 56 Operational Training Unit, in Lincolnshire, Checketts learned to fly the Hawker Hurricane and was assessed as an above-average pilot. Despite his familiarity with the Hurricane, his first operational posting, in November 1941, was to the Supermarine Spitfire-equipped No. 485 (New Zealand) Squadron. Aged 29, he was much older than his fellow fighter pilots. The squadron, with largely New Zealand flying personnel but British ground crew and administration, was based at Kenley, south of London. It shared the facilities with No. 452 (Australia) Squadron and No. 602 Squadron, and these all formed the Kenley Wing. A New Zealander, Al Deere, was commander of No. 602 Squadron and he and Checketts became great friends. At their first encounter, Checketts was depressed; he had struggled on his orientation flight in a Spitfire and was concerned that his squadron commander would transfer him on account of his poor performance. Deere, seeing Checketts on his own, went over and after listening to him, provided reassurance.

Soon becoming familiar with the Spitfire, Checketts began flying missions, his first being on 7 January 1942. On 12 February 1942 the Kenley Wing took part in an operation escorting torpedo-bombers over the English Channel during Operation Cerberus, when the German battleships Scharnhorst and Gneisenau steamed rapidly from Brest in France to reach safety in German ports. Although he did not encounter any German aircraft, Checketts, flying at the rear of his four-man section, used his Spitfire's cannon to help sink an E-boat. The squadron shot down four aircraft and damaged several others, as well as accounting for an E-boat and their exploits received extensive publicity in British and New Zealand newspapers.

In March 1942, having already attacked an E-boat earlier in the flight, Checketts had his first dogfight with German aircraft while escorting Douglas Boston bombers on a mission to Le Havre. Attacked by Messerschmitt Bf 109s, he accidentally set off a series of Very flares while performing evasive moves. This apparently scared off the attacking Bf 109. Further missions across the English Channel followed, and on 4 May 1942, Checketts was set upon by six Bf 109s. He was shot down and bailed out over the channel. He was rescued from his inflatable dinghy by a rescue launch of the Royal Navy. It was only after he was aboard the launch that he realised he had been wounded in the leg by shrapnel. His injuries were minor and he returned to operational duties, carrying out interception and low-level strafing missions, escorting bombers, and undertaking fighter sweeps, within three days of being shot down.

Checketts was promoted to flying officer in June 1942 and was soon posted to "Sailor" Malan's Central Gunnery School at Sutton Bridge, in Lincolnshire. He soon became friendly with Malan, the two going hunting together, and he spent a month improving his aerial marksmanship. Rated "above average" at aerial marksmanship by Malan, Checketts rejoined No. 485 Squadron, which was being rested from frontline duties, on 23 July. Now based at King's Cliffe near Peterborough, the squadron was conducting convoy and night patrols over Norfolk as well as fighter sweeps across to the Low Countries. In mid-August 1942, having accumulated 220 operational flying hours in nine months, and in need of a rest, Checketts was sent to Martlesham Heath to serve as an instructor in fighter gunnery, specialising in deflection shooting. After a few months, he returned to operational duties, this time with No. 611 Squadron. Along with No. 340 Squadron, a Free French squadron, it formed a wing, commanded by Al Deere and based at Biggin Hill as part of No. 11 Fighter Group.

Checketts was soon flying offensive operations with the Spitfire Vb, escorting a bombing raid to Abbeville on 13 January 1943, during which he engaged and damaged a Focke-Wulf Fw 190. This was his first official claim for a damaged fighter; Malan, now station commander at Biggin Hill, had queried Checketts about the operation afterwards and ordered him to make a claim. Although Checketts had damaged others in the previous year he had never put in official claims for them. The Spitfire Vb was outclassed by the Fw 190 and the squadron soon reequipped with the Spitfire IXb. In April 1943, Checketts was given command of the squadron's B Flight. On 30 May 1943 he shot down a Fw 190 while on an escort mission to Caen. This was his first confirmed aerial victory; he had already damaged four Fw 190s earlier in the month.

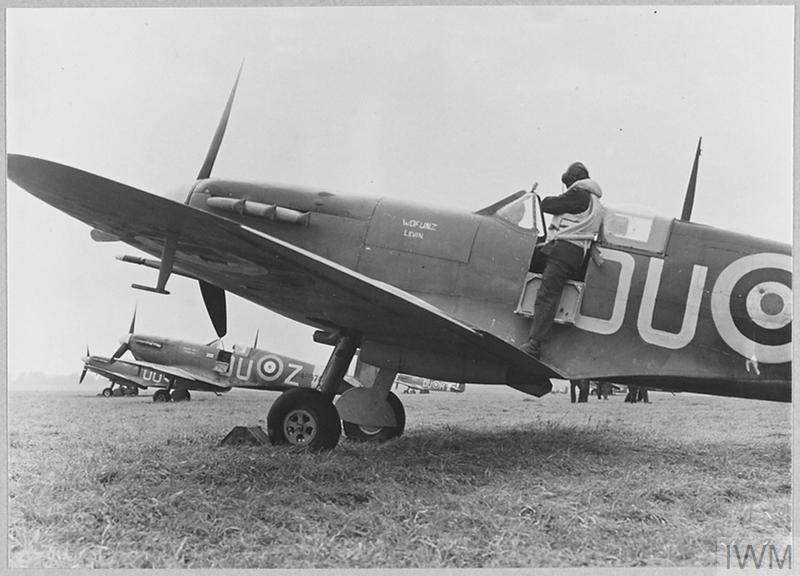
A line up of Spitfire Vbs of No. 485 (NZ) Squadron

Mid-1943 was spent primarily escorting medium bombers on raids to France, Belgium and the Netherlands, or in offensive operations against German fighters. In June 1943, Checketts was promoted to flight lieutenant and also received an honorary commission as a pilot in the Free French Air Forces. By this time, he was regularly flying alongside No. 341 Squadron, another Free French unit that had replaced No. 340 Squadron. Later in the month, he was able to test fly a captured Fw 190, considering it well matched against his Spitfire except at high altitudes. At the end of the month, he was advised that the squadron was to be withdrawn from the frontline for a rest. Since the start of the year, Checketts had recorded 196 flying hours and completed 100 missions; as it happened, he was to remain at Biggin Hill. On the recommendation of Deere, Checketts was given command of his former unit, No. 485 Squadron, now part of the Biggin Hill Wing, and promoted to squadron leader the following month. Checketts' new command would have had, as a typical fighter squadron, an operational establishment of 16 aircraft. It was to swap their old Spitfire Vbs with No. 611 Squadron's Spitfire IXbs.

=== Command of No. 485 Squadron ===
On assuming command of No. 485 Squadron, Checketts changed its tactics, drilling it in the "finger four" formation rather than the weaving formation previously used and which led to avoidable casualties. His new command spent several weeks on bomber escort duties and on 15 July 1943 he shot down a Fw 190 near the Somme Estuary. This was followed several days later by two more Fw 190s, one over Tricqueville and the other on the French coast. He had accounted for two of the four German aircraft shot down by No. 485 Squadron that day. The wing's No. 341 Squadron destroyed a further five aircraft. With neither squadron of the Biggin Hill Wing suffering any casualties, it was recognised for its efforts with congratulatory telegrams from Winston Churchill and Air Marshal Trafford Leigh-Mallory, the head of Fighter Command. On 31 July 1943, Checketts claimed a Bf 109G while on a bomber escort mission to Tricqueville. Guiding the squadron towards Douai as cover for a group of Martin B-26 Marauder bombers on 9 August 1943, Checketts spotted a flight of eight Bf 109s in the distance. With the permission of Deere, also flying as commander of the Biggin Hill wing, Checketts led a breakaway section of four Spitfires to attack them. He quickly destroyed three of the Bf 109s and damaged another while the other pilots in the section destroyed one each. This action received considerable publicity and was the subject of a BBC radio broadcast featuring Checketts. For his exploits he was later awarded the Distinguished Flying Cross (DFC); the citation, published on 17 August 1943, read:

This officer has led the squadron and, on occasions the wing, with great skill. He has invariably displayed great keenness to engage the enemy and has destroyed two enemy aircraft and damaged several more. In addition he has destroyed two E-boats and successfully attacked military installations.

— London Gazette, No. 36135, 17 August 1943.

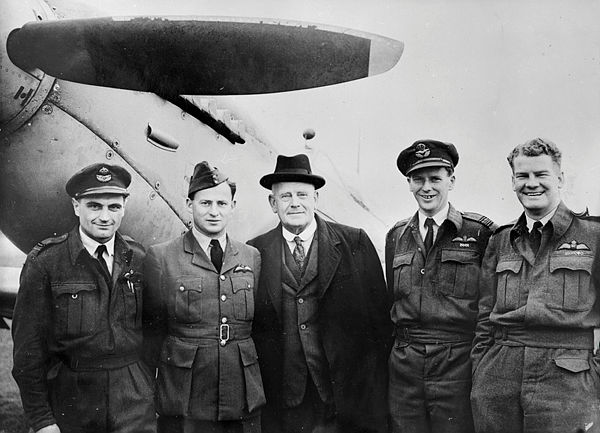
Checketts stands fourth left, with Wing Commander Alan Deere on his left and the New Zealand High Commissioner, William Jordan, on his right, on the latter's visit to No. 485 Squadron, 1943

While acting as high cover for bombers attacking an airfield near Rouen on 22 August, No. 485 Squadron was jumped by a force of Fw 190s and Bf 109s, and several pilots were shot down. Checketts probably destroyed a Bf 109 but as he did not see it go down, he claimed it as damaged. The following day, he shot down a Fw 190. By now he was occasionally leading the Biggin Hill Wing on its raids, one being on 24 August 1943, when it covered a bombing raid on an airfield near Paris.

On 6 September 1943, No. 485 Squadron flew high cover for B-26 Marauders bombing the rail marshalling yards at Serqueux, Seine-Maritime. The Spitfires were attacked by 20 Fw 190s from above. Checketts shot one down but was then attacked by several others and his aircraft was set on fire. Burned and wounded, he struggled to bail out. He landed 10 kilometres (6.2 mi) from Abbeville in a field where he was approached by a French boy who helped him on to his bicycle and then wheeled him to nearby woods. The next day he was taken by a Frenchman to his own home, where his injuries were tended by the Frenchman's wife.

After several days of recovery, Checketts was passed onto the French Resistance, which shuttled him from house to house until he met with four other downed pilots in hiding, including another from his squadron, Flight Sergeant Terry Kearins, who had been shot down on 15 July. Several days of travel around the north of France ensued as various plans to get the pilots to England were formulated and discarded. During this time, they stayed with the Lavanants, a French farmer and his family. Their daughter, Marie, was active in the resistance. Eventually, they were taken across the English Channel in a fishing boat.

Checketts underwent an intensive debriefing to confirm his identity and to eliminate the possibility that he was a German spy before returning to No. 485 Squadron, which was now based at Hornchurch. He requested a return to operational duty but this was denied; he was advised by the commander of No. 11 Group, Air Vice Marshal Hugh Saunders, that he needed a less stressful role. Checketts was posted to the Central Gunnery School as an instructor, ending his tenure as commander of No. 485 Squadron.

From the time he took command until he was shot down, No. 485 Squadron had destroyed more enemy aircraft than any other squadron of No. 11 Fighter Group. In December 1943, he was awarded the Distinguished Service Order (DSO). The citation, published in the London Gazette, read:

In air operations this officer has displayed courage, fortitude and skill of a high order. He has taken part in a very large number and has proved his skill in many combats, having destroyed at least 11 aircraft; he has also caused the destruction of 2 E. boats. By his exceptional keenness and fine fighting spirit, Squadron Leader Checketts has proved a source of inspiration to all.

— London Gazette, No. 36271, 3 December 1943.

=== Return to operations ===
After six months as an instructor, in April 1944 Checketts was given command of No. 1 Squadron. It was equipped with the Hawker Typhoon fighter-bomber but was to convert to Spitfires. After six weeks, he was promoted to wing commander and appointed to lead Horne Wing, which included three squadrons of Spitfires and was based at Horne in Surrey. From Horne, he led his command as it provided cover for the invasion of Normandy and subsequent operations into Caen. He carried out four sorties on D-Day, logging seven hours and 35 minutes of flight time. During the course of the day, his aircraft was struck by friendly fire from British ships off the landing beaches. Soon after D-Day the Germans started launching V-1 flying bombs and by the middle of the month, he had destroyed two of these. On 27 August 1944, he was leading one squadron as an escort to Avro Lancaster and Handley Page Halifax heavy bombers on their way to attack an oil refinery near Düsseldorf. Messerschmitt Me 163 rocket fighters of Jagdgeschwader 400 were scrambled to intercept the bombers and were engaged by his fighters. Checketts was attacked by an Me 163 but managed to evade it.

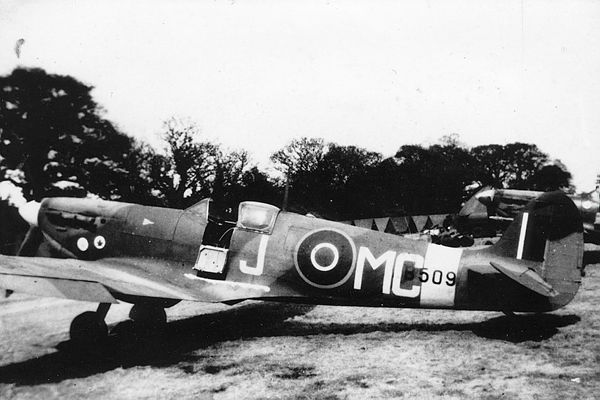
Checkett's Spitfire when he flew as wing commander of Horne Wing, 1944

By September 1944, Checketts' wing was primarily engaged in escorting American heavy bombers on daylight missions to Germany. He was later awarded the Silver Star for this work. His last operation with Horne Wing was on 25 September 1944. While flying as high escort cover over Arnhem, he shared in the destruction of a Bf 109 with one of his flight commanders. The next day, overdue for a rest having flown 115 missions and logging 301 flying hours as wing commander, he was removed from flight duty.

This would prove to be the end of Checketts' operational career in the war. He was credited with destroying 14½ enemy aircraft, along with three probables and 11 damaged. He had also destroyed two V-1 flying bombs. Aviation historians Christopher Shores and Clive Williams consider he had achieved 14 victories, three probables, eight damaged and two V-1s destroyed. He was the eighth most successful New Zealand fighter pilot of the war, based on enemy aircraft destroyed. As well as receiving the DSO, DFC and Silver Star, he was made an honorary member of the Free Polish Air Force, having flown 25 missions with the RAF's No. 303 Polish Squadron, part of the Horne Wing, and awarded the Cross of Valour.

=== Final months of war service ===
In October 1944, Checketts was posted to the Central Fighter Establishment at the RAF base at Wittering, near Peterborough. He specialised in the analysis of short-range high altitude fighters, discussing and writing about the tactics of using these types of aircraft. In the course of his duties, he flew several types of aircraft, both Allied and German. He also returned to France to visit the various people who had helped him evade capture there after being shot down. He was distressed to find that at least one had been arrested by the Germans and later died in captivity.

By April 1945, with the war in Europe nearly over, Checketts sought a transfer to the Pacific Theatre of Operations so that he could fly with the RNZAF against the Japanese. This was declined and he instead was sent to the Empire Central Flying School in Wiltshire. This was considered to be a "university of flying", and when he graduated in August 1945 it was with a "Distinguished Pass". The war against Japan had ended and the RNZAF ordered him home for repatriation. He arrived back in New Zealand on 1 October 1945, having travelled there via Canada, the United States and Fiji. His reception at Auckland included a large press contingent.

== Postwar career ==
After the war Checketts, wanting to remain in the RNZAF, was encouraged by the Chief of Air Staff, Air Vice-Marshal Leonard Isitt, to consider a transfer to the RAF. Isitt advised that career prospects in the RNZAF were likely to be limited as it would be downsized considerably from its war footing. Checketts reaffirmed his desire to serve in New Zealand, notwithstanding the comments of Walter Nash, the Minister of Finance, to expect a cut in pay. Nash's comments greatly angered Checketts, who pointed out that the government was quite prepared to pay more when pilots' lives were at risk serving their country in wartime.

On 10 November 1945, in Christchurch, Checketts married Natalie Grover, whom he had first met during training at Wigram in 1940. Several former pilots of No. 485 Squadron attended the ceremony as did the New Zealand High Commissioner from London, on a visit to Christchurch at the time. Checketts' first post-war position with the RNZAF was as administrative officer at Wigram, assisting with the demobilisation of RNZAF personnel. He soon lost his rank of acting wing commander, reverting to squadron leader but this was restored in February 1947. Later that year, he set a new record of three hours and 38 minutes for an aeroplane crossing the Tasman Sea when he delivered a de Havilland Mosquito recently acquired by the RNZAF from the Royal Australian Air Force.

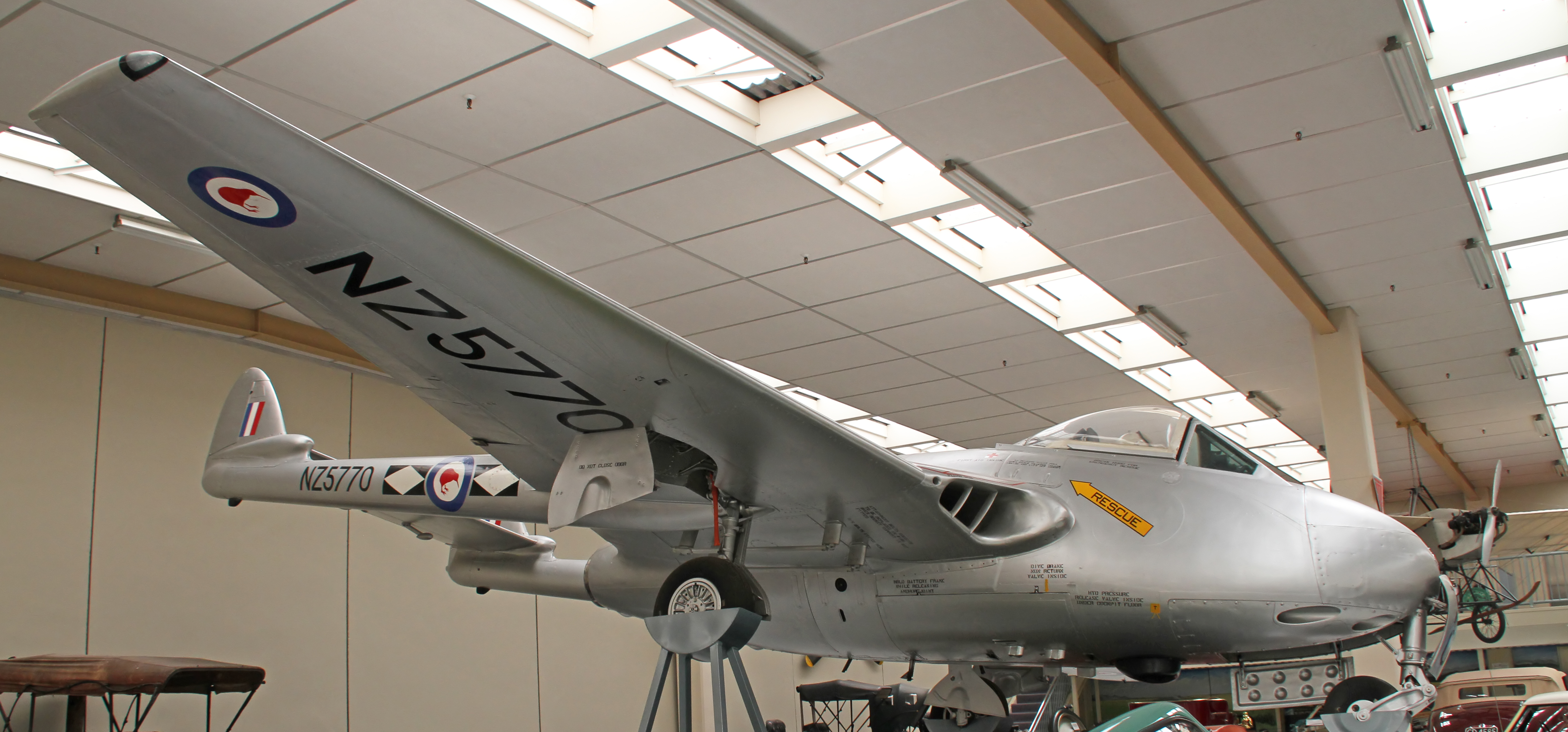
Checketts implemented the introduction of the de Havilland Vampire, shown here at the Southward Car Museum in Otaihanga, to the RNZAF

In November 1947, with his wing commander rank made substantive, Checketts was appointed commander of the RNZAF Station at Laucala Bay in Fiji. This was followed by a year, beginning in January 1950, at the Royal Air Force Staff College in Bracknell, England. He then held a short posting with British Air Forces of Occupation in Germany before returning to New Zealand in April 1951. Checketts was appointed officer commanding the RNZAF Flying Wing based at Ohakea in May 1951. He was responsible for introducing the de Havilland Vampire to form No. 14 Squadron, the RNZAF's first jet squadron.

Checketts became commander of Taieri Station in December 1952, training flyers for the New Zealand Territorial Air Force. He also served for a time as aide-de-camp to the Governor General, Sir Willoughby Norrie, was involved in the New Zealand leg of the 1953–54 Royal Tour, and was awarded the Queen Elizabeth II Coronation Medal.

At the time of Checketts' command of Taieri Station, the main aircraft used in flight training were the Harvard and the North American P-51 Mustang, the latter of which he considered unsuitable for use by inexperienced territorial pilots. In September 1954, an aircraft practicing night flying from Taieri Station crashed, killing the pilot and his passenger. Unbeknown to Checketts, territorial pilots were not allowed to perform night flying and at the subsequent inquiry, he was held responsible for the accident. Checketts resigned from the RNZAF in protest, considering the outcome unjustified.

== Later life ==
Following his resignation from the RNZAF, Checketts started an aerial topdressing company, going into partnership with Leonard Wright, the mayor of Dunedin, and Jack Manchester, a former captain of the All Blacks. Recognising that aerial topdressing, not widely employed in farming in New Zealand at the time, could be a lucrative business, he purchased a Tiger Moth to form the basis of the business. Although Checketts had intended to focus on bringing in orders, he ended up doing most of the flying for the company when the original pilot crashed the Tiger Moth. In July 1958, having experienced two plane crashes, he sold the business. He became a salesman of agricultural chemicals, working for his former business partner, Wright.

In 1963, Checketts was the successful applicant for the position of secretary-manager for the Otago Acclimatisation Society. In this role, he was involved in the regulation of hunting and fishing as well as conservation work. In 1973, he moved to Christchurch to take up similar work on behalf of the North Canterbury Acclimatisation Society. His role required him to liaise with hunting and fishing organisations, which were often in conflict. Worn down by the stresses, he resigned from the society in 1978 and found part-time employment in the leather-working industry. He retired in 1982.

In his later years, Checketts was involved in the development of the Royal New Zealand Air Force Museum at Wigram. He was already an honorary member of the No. 1 Officer's Mess at the RNZAF base at Wigram. In 1990, he was the subject of a "This Is Your Life" television show, which reunited him with Marie Lavenant, who had helped him return to England after he had bailed out over France. Another participant in the show was Deere, his former commander. Checketts died of cancer at his home in Christchurch on 21 April 2006, aged 94. He was survived by two sons and a daughter, his wife having predeceased him by several years. After a service at St. Matthew's Anglican Church, for which the RNZAF provided a guard of honour, a P-51D Mustang performed a flypast.

== Legacy ==
Checketts is remembered by at least two street names in New Zealand towns; Checketts Avenue in Christchurch and Checketts Place in his hometown, Invercargill. The engine from the Spitfire which he bailed out of over France in 1943 was later recovered and is now displayed at the Air Force Museum of New Zealand at Wigram.
