= James Latta (RAF officer) =

British flying ace

- Born: 13 May 1897; Hendon, Middlesex, England
- Died: 1974 (aged 76–77); Lancashire, England
- Military career
- Allegiance: United Kingdom
- Branch: British Army; Royal Air Force
- Service years: 1914–1919; 1925–1927
- Rank: Squadron Leader
- Units: No. 1 Squadron RFC; No. 60 Squadron RFC; No.66 Squadron RFC
- Commands: No. 602 (City of Glasgow) (Bomber) Squadron
- Conflicts: First World War; Western Front
- Awards: Military Cross
- Other work: Businessman

James Douglas Latta, MC (13 May 1897 – 1974) was a British flying ace of the First World War, credited with five aerial victories.

== Early life and background ==
Latta was the second son of James Gilmore Latta (1865–1927) from Troon and Agnes (née Douglas) from Tarbolton. His father was an engineer who had worked for the companies of Andrew Barclay and G. & J. Weir, before becoming part-owner and managing director of the Scottish Stamping & Engineering Company at Ayr in 1920. Latta was educated at University College School, London.

== First World War ==
On the outbreak of the First World War in 1914, both Latta and his older brother, John, enlisted in the London Scottish Regiment, but both subsequently transferred to the Royal Flying Corps. Latta was commissioned as a second lieutenant (on probation) in the RFC on 9 February 1915, and was granted Royal Aero Club Aviators' Certificate No. 2067 on 16 November, after flying a Maurice Farman biplane at the Military School at Norwich, while serving in No. 5 Reserve Aeroplane Squadron. He was appointed a flying officer on 24 February 1916, and confirmed in his rank on 11 March.

Latta was posted to No. 1 Squadron to serve as a fighter pilot flying a Nieuport. Latta gained his first victory by destroying an enemy aircraft over Wezmacquart on 1 June 1916. His next two victories, on 25 and 26 June, made him a balloon buster, as he shot down an enemy observation balloon on each day. It also won him the Military Cross, which was gazetted a month later on 27 July. His citation read:

Second Lieutenant James Douglas Latta, RFC, Special Reserve.
For conspicuous gallantry and skill. On two occasions he attacked enemy kite balloons, and each time brought down the kite in flames. He has often driven off enemy aircraft, and his own machine has been badly hit.

On 1 July 1916 Latta was promoted to lieutenant, and was transferred to No. 60 Squadron where he drove down two enemy aircraft out of control on 31 August and 19 September. On 4 October Latta was appointed a flight commander with the temporary rank of captain. He was withdrawn from battle for a rest on 23 November, but in May 1917 joined No. 66 Squadron as a flight commander, flying a Sopwith Pup. He was shot down and wounded in action on 8 June. He saw no further active duty in WWI after that.

Latta was transferred to the unemployed list of the RAF on 2 February 1919.

== Post-war career ==
Latta returned home to pursue a career in engineering, but retained his interest in aviation. Following the formation of the Auxiliary Air Force, Latta was appointed commander of No. 602 (City of Glasgow) (Bomber) Squadron in October 1925, with the rank of squadron leader. He was unable to take up command until 1 February 1926, so Squadron Leader C. N. Lowe was appointed temporary commander until then. No. 602 Squadron's initial complement consisted of two DH.9As, two Avro 504s, four AAF officers, 83 AAF airmen and 22 regular RAF airmen. However, on 6 May 1927, Latta resigned his commission.

In 1934 Latta became chairman and managing director of the Scottish Stamping and Engineering Co. Ltd. At the 1937 British Industries Fair, Scottish Stamping listed its products as drop forgings for the automobile, aircraft, shipbuilding and general engineering trades. In 1938, in co-operation with the Air Ministry, it invested in new buildings and plant for the production of heavy forgings, and during the Second World War became a specialised producer of components for aircraft. In 1939 Latta, alongside such notables as Sir James Lithgow and Sir Steven Bilsland, was among the founders of Scottish Aircraft Components Ltd., a new company formed in Glasgow. Post-war, Scottish Stamping returned to producing vehicle components and drop forgings. The company was bought by GKN in 1953.

Latta died in Lancashire in 1974.

== Bibliography ==
- Shores, Christopher F.; Franks, Norman & Guest, Russell F. (1990). Above the Trenches: a Complete Record of the Fighter Aces and Units of the British Empire Air Forces 1915–1920. London, UK: Grub Street. ISBN 978-0-948817-19-9.
