= RAF Staff College =

The RAF Staff College may refer to:

- RAF Staff College, Andover (active: 1922 to 1940 and 1948 to 1970)
- RAF Staff College, Bulstrode Park (active: 1941 to 1948)
- RAF Staff College, Bracknell (active: 1945 to 1997)
- RAF Staff College, Bracknell, Berkshire, painting by Ronald Wong
- RAF Staff College (Overseas) in Haifa (active: 1944 to 1946)
