= RAF Southend =

RAF Southend RAF Rochford
- Rochford, Essex in England
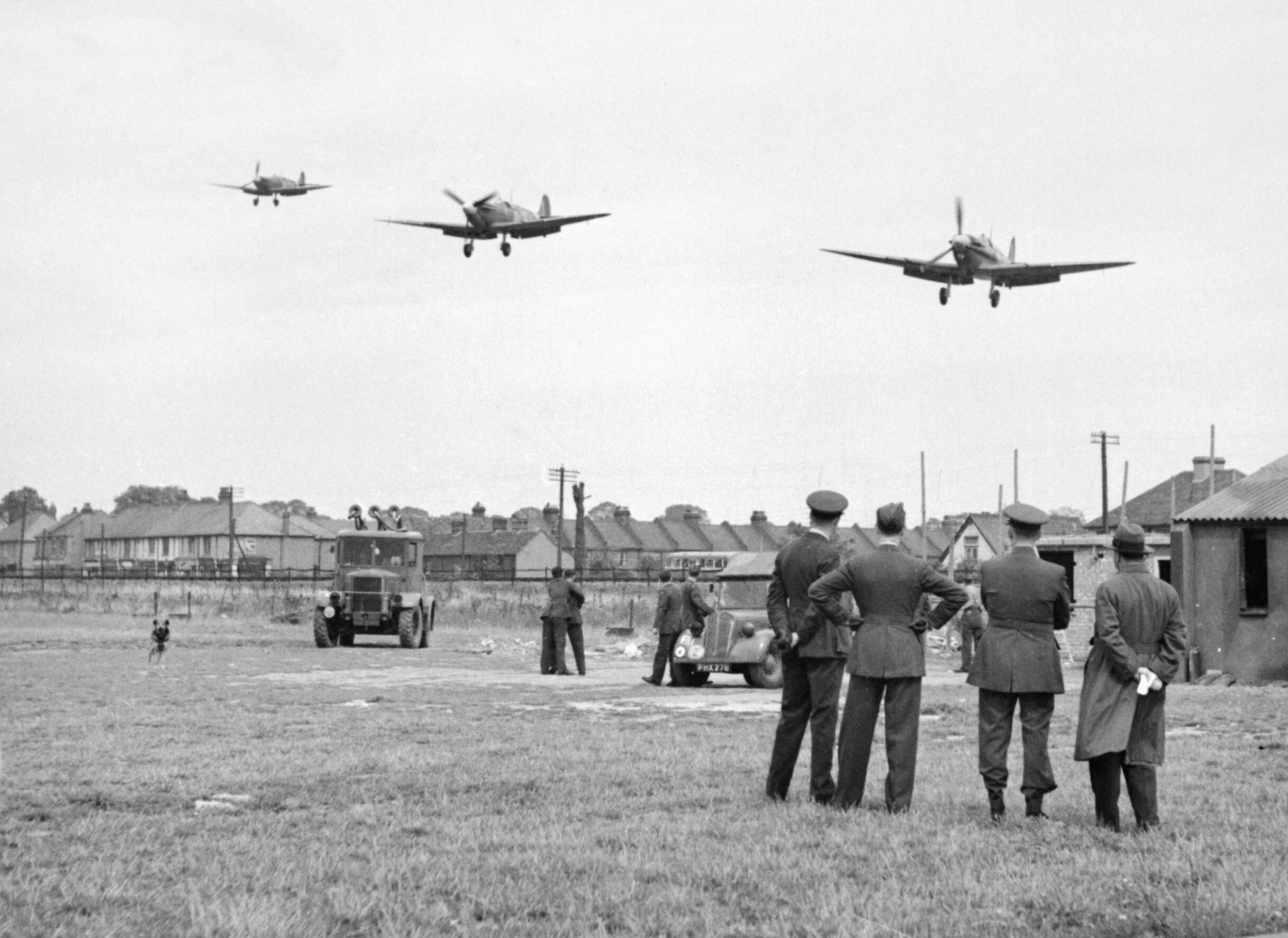
- Personnel of 121 Squadron watch Supermarine Spitfires coming into land at RAF Rochford, August 1943

Site information
- Type: Royal Air Force station
- Owner: Air Ministry; Admiralty
- Operator: Royal Air Force; Royal Naval Air Service
- Controlled by: RAF Fighter Command

Location
- Shown within Essex RAF Southend (the United Kingdom)
- Coordinates: 51°34′13″N 000°41′36″E

Site history
- Built: 1915 & 1939
- In use: 1915 - 1919; 1939 - 1945
- Fate: Civilian use as London Southend Airport
- Battles/wars: European theatre of World War II

Airfield information
Runways
| Direction | Length and surface |
|---|---|
| 05/23 | Grass |

Royal Air Force Southend or more simply RAF Southend is a former Royal Air Force station located near to Rochford, Essex, UK. At the start of the Second World War it was known as RAF Rochford.

The site is now known as London Southend Airport.

== Units ==
The following units were here at some point:

- No. 19 Squadron RAF between 16 and 20 August 1942 with the Supermarine Spitfire VB then again between 12 and 20 May 1944 with the North American Mustang III
- No. 37 Squadron RAF
- No. 41 Squadron RAF
- No. 54 Squadron RAF
- No. 56 Squadron RAF
- No. 61 Squadron RAF
- No. 64 Squadron RAF
- No. 65 (East India) Squadron RAF
- No. 66 Squadron RAF
- No. 74 Squadron RAF
- No. 121 (Eagle) Squadron RAF
- No. 122 (Bombay) Squadron RAF
- No. 124 (Baroda) Squadron RAF
- No. 127 Squadron RAF
- No. 137 Squadron RAF
- No. 141 Squadron RAF
- No. 151 Squadron RAF
- No. 152 (Hyderabad) Squadron RAF
- No. 222 (Natal) Squadron RAF
- No. 234 (Madras Presidency) Squadron RAF
- No. 264 (Madras Presidency) Squadron RAF
- No. 287 Squadron RAF
- No. 291 Squadron RAF
- No. 302 Polish Fighter Squadron
- No. 310 (Czechoslovak) Squadron RAF
- No. 312 (Czechoslovak) Squadron RAF
- No. 313 (Czechoslovak) Squadron RAF
- No. 317 Polish Fighter Squadron
- No. 331 (Norwegian) Squadron RAF
- No. 332 (Norwegian) Squadron RAF
- No. 349 (Belgian) Squadron RAF
- No. 350 (Belgian) Squadron RAF
- No. 402 Squadron RCAF
- No. 403 Squadron RCAF
- No. 411 Squadron RCAF
- No. 453 Squadron RAAF
- No. 501 (County of Gloucester) Squadron AAF
- No. 600 (City of London) Squadron AAF
- No. 603 (City of Edinburgh) Squadron AAF
- No. 611 (West Lancashire) Squadron AAF
- No. 616 (South Yorkshire) Squadron AAF

First World War units

- No. 11 (Home Defence) Reserve Squadron RFC between 24 January and 8 February 1917 became No. 98 Depot Squadron RFC between 8 February and 27 June 1917, became No. 198 Depot Squadron RFC between 27 June and 21 December 1917, became No. 198 (Night) Training Squadron RAF between 21 December 1917 and May 1919 when the unit disbanded
- No. 99 Depot Squadron RFC between 1 and 23 June 1917
- No. 190 Depot Squadron RFC between 24 October and 21 December 1917, became No. 190 (Night) Training Squadron RFC between 21 December 1917 and 14 March 1918

Units

- Detachment from No. 6 Anti-Aircraft Co-operation Unit RAF between 19 August and 18 September 1943
- No. 17 Armament Practice Camp RAF between 18 October 1943 and 27 August 1944
- No. 34 Elementary and Reserve Flying Training School RAF between 1 January and 3 September 1939
- Salvage Ferry Service Detachment from No. 71 Maintenance Unit RAF from 1 April 1945
- No. 148 Gliding School RAF between July 1944 and 16 June 1949
- No. 413 (Polish) Repair & Salvage Unit RAF between 3 January and 15 March 1944
- No. 1488 (Fighter) Gunnery Flight RAF initially between 22 April and 7 June 1942 then between 17 August and 18 October 1943
- No. 1488 (Target Towing) Flight RAF between 9 February and 22 April 1942
- No. 2703 Squadron RAF Regiment
- No. 2729 Squadron RAF Regiment
- No. 2761 Squadron RAF Regiment
- No. 2766 Squadron RAF Regiment
- No. 2810 Squadron RAF Regiment
- No. 2820 Squadron RAF Regiment
- No. 2830 Squadron RAF Regiment
- No. 2834 Squadron RAF Regiment
- No. 2839 Squadron RAF Regiment
- No. 2877 Squadron RAF Regiment
- 'C' Section from No. 3209 Servicing Commando between 12 December 1943 and 1 February 1944

== Current use ==
The site is now London Southend Airport.

== See also ==
- List of former Royal Air Force stations
