= No. 602 Squadron RAuxAF =

Squadron of the Royal Air Force

No. 602 (City of Glasgow) Squadron RAuxAF
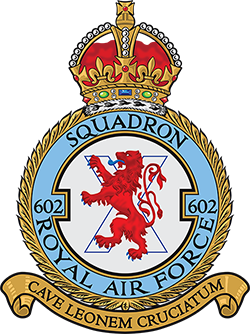
- No. 602 Squadron badge with Edinburgh Castle Lion heraldry and crown of King George during WWII.
- Active: 12 September 1925 – 15 July 1945; 10 May 1946 – 10 March 1957; 1 July 2006 – present
- Country: United Kingdom
- Branch: Royal Auxiliary Air Force
- Role: General Service Support Squadron
- Part of: No. 1 Group RAF
- Headquarters: Kings Park, Glasgow (present)
- Nickname: City of Glasgow "Glasgow's Own"
- Mottos: Latin: Cave leonem cruciatum (Translation: "Beware the crossed lion")
- Colours: Grey Douglas tartan
- Battle honours: Home Defence, 1940–1945; Battle of Britain, 1940; Fortress Europe, 1940–1944; Channel and North Sea, 1940–1943; Dieppe; France and Germany, 1944–1945; Normandy,1944; These honours are those emblazoned on the squadron standard.

Commanders
- Current commander: Sqn Ldr C Loughlin RAF
- Honorary Air Commodore (HAC): Charles Berry BSc MSc DEng
- Notable commanders: Sandy Johnstone, Al Deere, Paddy Finucane

Insignia
- Squadron Badge: In front of a saltire, a lion rampantThe lion was adopted in view of the squadron's association with Scotland and the saltire to represent the cross of St Andrew, being fimbriated to show it as a white saltire on a blue background.
- Squadron Codes: ZT (May 1939 – Sep 1939); LO (Jan 1939 – May 1939; Sep 1939 – May 1945, 1949 – 1953); RAI (May 1946 – 1949)

602 (City of Glasgow) Squadron is a Royal Auxiliary Air Force squadron. Originally formed in 1925 as a light bomber squadron, its role changed in 1938 to army co-operation and in 1939 to that of a fighter squadron.

During the Second World War, the squadron flew Spitfires and took part in the Battle of Britain. After the war, the squadron was reinstated as a fighter squadron within the Royal Auxiliary Air Force, until all these units disbanded in March 1957.

Reformed on 1 July 2006, the Squadron assumed the ISTAR mission support role formerly held by the Mission Support Element (MSE) of 603 (City of Edinburgh) Squadron. In this role the squadron provided flight operations and intelligence support to the RAF at home and overseas, first from Edinburgh before returning to its home city of Glasgow in August 2008.

The squadron underwent a transformation between 2012 and 2014 as it took on more diverse branches and trades and moved under the command of AOC 1 Group, reporting through the UK Joint Force Air Component and Headquarters 1 Group Reserves. At the end of 2014 the squadron moved its headquarters to the Reserve Centre in the King's Park area on the south side of Glasgow. It was later confirmed as a 1 Group General Service Support (GSS) Squadron and, along with the other 1 Group GSS Squadrons, moved from auspices of the UK Joint Force Air Component to sit under the 1* Commandant Air & Space Warfare Centre.

== Formation and early years ==
The squadron was formed at RAF Renfrew on 15 September 1925 as a light bomber squadron in the Auxiliary Air Force, and initially equipped with Airco DH.9As. These were replaced by Fairey Fawns in 1927, Westland Wapitis in 1929, Hawker Harts in 1934 and finally Hawker Hinds in 1936.

The squadron continued in the light bomber role until 1 November 1938 when it was redesignated as an Army Co-operation unit. This did not last long, and on 14 January 1939 the squadron became a fighter squadron. It received Hawker Hectors in November, but was re-equipped with Gloster Gauntlets on conversion to a fighter role. These were short-lived, as Spitfires arrived in May 1939.

== Second World War ==
Like 603 (City of Edinburgh) Squadron, 602 Squadron spent the early part of the war and Battle of Britain on defensive duties in Scotland. In August 1940, it moved south to join the battle, returning to Scotland in December. It moved south again in July 1941, remaining for a year before returning north. Another move came in January 1943, this time to the southwest, where in April it joined the newly forming 2nd Tactical Air Force. It briefly returned to Scotland from January to March 1944, when it returned south prior to taking part in the invasion of Europe.

From the end of June 1944, it operated from advance airfields in Normandy following the Army's advance into Belgium until September, when it returned from Antwerp to the UK. From RAF Coltishall flying Spitfire XVIs it carried out operations against V2 sites in the Netherlands over an area ranging from The Hook to Den Helder, until disbanding on 15 May 1945 at Coltishall.

Among No. 602's pilots was Raymond Baxter, later to become well known on television as a presenter of the BBC TV series Tomorrow's World. Andrew McDowall became a flying ace with the squadron during the Battle of Britain. Pierre Clostermann served as a pilot officer in the squadron in 1943 and 1944.

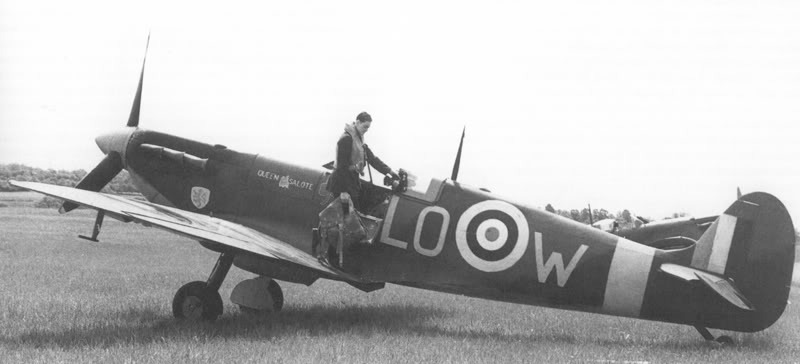
'Paddy' Finucane on top of his Spitfire Mk Vb (BM124) LO-W, "QUEEN of SALOTE", while in command of No.602 Squadron at RAF Redhill, early 1942.

== Post-war ==
With the reactivation of the Royal Auxiliary Air Force, No 602 was reformed on 10 May 1946 at RAF Abbotsinch as a day fighter squadron. It was initially equipped with Spitfire F.14s and later with F.21s and F.22s, until January 1951 when Vampire FB.5s were received. It also acquired some F.3s in August 1953, which it flew alongside the FB.5s until February 1954. FB.9s arrived in November 1954 and the squadron continued to fly both types (FB.5 and FB.9s) until, along with all the flying units of the RAuxAF, it was disbanded on 10 March 1957.

== Present role ==
As part of the new Royal Air Force Reserves umbrella organisation encompassing both the RAuxAF and RAFR, No 602 Squadron was reformed on 1 July 2006 when the mission support element of 603 (City of Edinburgh) Sqn was separated to form a new unit. As detailed above, it first provided operational support to the RAF Air Traffic Management Force, in the UK as well as to other deployed locations as needed before transforming as part of No 1 Group to become a General Service Support Squadron with approximately 20 branches and trades. The Squadron Mission is to generate, develop, sustain and retain trained volunteer Reservists prepared to deploy within the UK and overseas in support of the RAF. Since 2012 some 39 individual deployments have included support to the RAF as far north as RAF Lossiemouth and as far south as the National Air Traffic Control Centre Swanwick as well as many other units in the UK. Additionally, personnel have deployed to Cyprus, Iraq, Qatar, the Falkland Islands, Malaysia and Singapore, Gibraltar and Oman.

The Squadron trains ab initio recruits in the basics of RAF service before they go on to specialise in their chosen branch or trade. The Squadron also recruits ex-Regular Subject Matter Experts (SME) who bring a huge range of skills which can be deployed in support of the Whole Force with little or no additional training.

Moray Flight of No. 602 Squadron was established in 2013 at RAF Lossiemouth and staffed entirely with SMEs to support NATO maritime patrol aircraft and the UK Maritime Air Operations Centre when deployed to the airfield. The unit is also supporting the introduction of the Boeing P-8A Poseidon at Lossiemouth. Moray Flight detach from 602 Squadron and become part of RAF Lossiemouth over late 2020 and early 2021.

== Aircraft operated ==
Aircraft operated by No 602 Squadron RAF-
From	To	Aircraft	Version
October 1925	January 1928	Airco DH.9	DH.9A
September 1927	September 1929	Fairey Fawn	
July 1929	April 1934	Westland Wapiti	Mk.IIa
February 1934	June 1936	Hawker Hart	
June 1936	January 1939	Hawker Hind	
November 1938	January 1939	Hawker Hector	Mk.I
January 1939	May 1939	Gloster Gauntlet	Mk.II
May 1939	June 1941	Supermarine Spitfire	Mk.I
May 1941	August 1941	Supermarine Spitfire	Mk.IIa
August 1941	September 1943	Supermarine Spitfire	Mk.Vb
September 1942	October 1942	Supermarine Spitfire	Mk.Va
September 1942	October 1942	Supermarine Spitfire	Mk.VI
October 1942	April 1943	Supermarine Spitfire	Mk.Vc
September 1943	January 1944	Supermarine Spitfire	Mk.IXb
January 1944	March 1944	Supermarine Spitfire	LF.Vb
March 1944	August 1944	Supermarine Spitfire	Mk.IXb
August 1944	September 1944	Supermarine Spitfire	Mk.IXe
September 1944	November 1944	Supermarine Spitfire	Mk.IXb
November 1944	May 1945	Supermarine Spitfire	Mk. XVI
August 1946	August 1947	Supermarine Spitfire	F.14
April 1947	May 1951	Supermarine Spitfire	F.21
June 1948	January 1951	Supermarine Spitfire	F.22
January 1951	March 1957	de Havilland Vampire	FB.5
August 1953	February 1954	de Havilland Vampire	F.3
November 1954	March 1957	de Havilland Vampire	FB.9

== Commanding officers ==
Officers Commanding No 602 Squadron RAF
From	To	Name
September 1925	February 1926	Sqn Ldr C.N. Lowe, MC, DFC
February 1926	May 1928	Sqn Ldr J.D. Latta, MC
May 1928	June 1931	Sqn Ldr J. Fullerton
June 1931	June 1936	Sqn Ldr Lord Clydesdale, AFC
June 1936	October 1937	Sqn Ldr D.F. McIntyre, AFC
October 1937	March 1940	Sqn Ldr A.D. Farquhar, DFC
March 1940	July 1940	Sqn Ldr G. Pinkerton, DFC
July 1940	June 1941	Sqn Ldr A.V.R. Johnstone, DFC
June 1941	August 1941	Sqn Ldr P.E. Meagher
August 1941	January 1942	Sqn Ldr A.C. Deere, DFC & Bar
January 1942	June 1942	Sqn Ldr B.E. Finucane, DSO, DFC & Bar
June 1942	October 1942	Sqn Ldr P.M. Brothers, DFC
October 1942	October 1943	Sqn Ldr M.F. Beytagh, DFC
October 1943	July 1944	Sqn Ldr R.A. Sutherland
July 1944	August 1944	Sqn Ldr J.J. Le Roux, DFC & 2 Bars
August 1944	September 1944	Sqn Ldr A.R. Stewart
September 1944	May 1945	Sqn Ldr R.A. Sutherland, DFC
May 1946	1950	Sqn Ldr M. Robinson, AFC
1950	1952	Sqn Ldr H.M. Stephen, DSO, DFC
1952	December 1953	Sqn Ldr J.A. Forrest
December 1953	1956	Sqn Ldr R.B. Davidson, DFC
1956	March 1957	Sqn Ldr C.D. Bartman
2006	2012	Sqn Ldr G. Lyall AE
2012	2020	Sqn Ldr A McCallum
2020	Present	Sqn Ldr C Loughlin

== Squadron airfields ==
Airfields used by No 602 Squadron RAF, data from

From	To	Station
12 September 1925	20 January 1933	RAF Renfrew, Renfrewshire, Scotland
20 January 1933	7 October 1939	RAF Abbotsinch, Renfrewshire, Scotland
7 October 1939	13 October 1939	RAF Grangemouth, Stirlingshire, Scotland
13 October 1939	14 April 1940	RAF Drem, East Lothian, Scotland
14 April 1940	28 May 1940	RAF Dyce, Aberdeenshire, Scotland
28 May 1940	13 August 1940	RAF Drem, East Lothian, Scotland
13 August 1940	17 December 1940	RAF Westhampnett, West Sussex
17 December 1940	15 April 1941	RAF Prestwick, Ayrshire, Scotland
15 April 1941	10 July 1941	RAF Ayr, Ayrshire, Scotland
10 July 1941	14 January 1942	RAF Kenley, Surrey
14 January 1942	4 March 1942	RAF Redhill, Surrey
4 March 1942	13 May 1942	RAF Kenley, Surrey
13 May 1942	17 July 1942	RAF Redhill, Surrey
17 July 1942	16 August 1942	RAF Peterhead, Aberdeenshire, Scotland
16 August 1942	20 August 1942	RAF Biggin Hill, Kent
20 August 1942	10 September 1942	RAF Peterhead, Aberdeenshire, Scotland
10 September 1942	20 January 1943	RAF Skaebrae, Orkney Islands, Scotland
20 January 1943	14 April 1943	RAF Perranporth, Cornwall
14 April 1943	29 April 1943	RAF Lasham, Hampshire
29 April 1943	1 June 1943	RAF Fairlop, Essex
1 June 1943	1 July 1943	RAF Bognor, West Sussex
1 July 1943	13 August 1943	RAF Kingsnorth, Kent
13 August 1943	12 October 1943	RAF Newchurch, Kent
12 October 1943	18 January 1944	RAF Detling, Kent
18 January 1944	12 March 1944	RAF Skeabrae, Orkney Islands, Scotland

From	To	Base
12 March 1944	13 March 1944	RAF Detling, Kent
13 March 1944	20 March 1944	RAF Llanbedr, Gwynedd, Wales
20 March 1944	18 April 1944	RAF Detling, Kent
18 April 1944	25 June 1944	RAF Ford, West Sussex
25 June 1944	13 August 1944	B.11/Longues-sur-Mer, France
13 August 1944	2 September 1944	B.19/Lingèvres, France
2 September 1944	5 September 1944	B.40/Nivillers, France
5 September 1944	17 September 1944	B.52/Douai, France
17 September 1944	29 September 1944	B.70/Deurne, Belgium
29 September 1944	18 October 1944	RAF Coltishall, Norfolk
18 October 1944	20 November 1944	RAF Matlaske, Norfolk
20 November 1944	19 February 1945	RAF Swannington, Norfolk
19 February 1945	23 February 1945	RAF Coltishall, Norfolk
23 February 1945	5 April 1945	RAF Ludham, Norfolk
5 April 1945	15 May 1945	RAF Coltishall, Norfolk
10 May 1946	30 July 1949	RAF Abbotsinch, Renfrewshire, Scotland
30 July 1949	15 April 1951	RAF Renfrew, Renfrewshire, Scotland
15 April 1951	14 July 1951	RAF Leuchars, Fife, Scotland
14 July 1951	15 April 1952	RAF Abbotsinch, Renfrewshire, Scotland
15 April 1952	18 June 1954	RAF Renfrew, Renfrewshire, Scotland
18 June 1954	10 March 1957	RAF Abbotsinch, Renfrewshire, Scotland
1 July 2006	27 October 2007	Combined HQ with 603 Sqn, Edinburgh, Scotland
27 October 2007	November 2014	Avenuepark Street, Maryhill, Glasgow, Scotland
November 2014	Present	Kings Park, Glasgow, Scotland
