= John Pattison (RNZAF officer) =

John Gordon Pattison
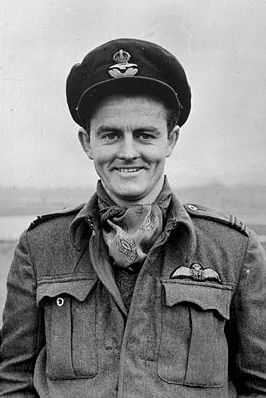
- Pattison during the Second World War
- Born: 27 January 1917; Waipawa, New Zealand
- Died: 11 September 2009 (aged 92); Hastings, New Zealand
- Military career
- Allegiance: New Zealand
- Branch: Royal New Zealand Air Force
- Service years: 1939–1945
- Rank: Squadron Leader
- Nickname: Johnnie
- Units: No. 266 Squadron; No. 92 Squadron; No. 485 (NZ) Squadron; No. 66 Squadron
- Commands: No. 485 (NZ) Squadron
- Conflicts: Second World War; Battle of Britain; Circus offensive; Invasion of Normandy
- Awards: Distinguished Service Order; Distinguished Flying Cross; Légion d'honneur

John Gordon Pattison, DSO, DFC (27 January 1917 – 11 September 2009) was a New Zealand fighter pilot and squadron commander of the Second World War.

Born in Waipawa, New Zealand, Pattison joined the RNZAF on the outbreak of the Second World War in 1939. After completing flight training he was sent to the United Kingdom to serve with the Royal Air Force. He flew Supermarine Spitfires with Nos. 266 and 92 Squadrons during the Battle of Britain and later flew with No. 485 (NZ) Squadron. After a period of service on instructing duties from mid-1943 to mid-1944, he flew with No. 66 Squadron before being appointed commander of No. 485 (NZ) Squadron. He led the unit, part of the 2nd Tactical Air Force, on operations in France, Belgium and Holland from September 1944 to February 1945 and was awarded the Distinguished Service Order for his service during this time. After the war, he returned to New Zealand and took up farming. In 2004, he was awarded the Légion d'honneur by the French government, in recognition of his services in the Normandy landings. He died in 2009, aged 92. At the time of his death he was one of the last surviving New Zealand fighter pilots of the Battle of Britain.

== Early life ==
John Gordon Pattison, the son of Charles Pattison, a farmer, was born 27 January 1917 in Waipawa, in the Hawke's Bay region, and was educated at schools in Havelock North before going on to Whanganui Collegiate School for three years from 1931. After completing his education, he worked on his father's farm. He joined the Civil Reserve of Pilots in January 1939, and learned to fly de Havilland Tiger Moths at Hastings.

== Second World War ==
Having accumulated 20 hours of flying time by the time of the outbreak of the Second World War in September 1939, Pattison volunteered for service with the Royal New Zealand Air Force (RNZAF). His training commenced on 26 October at Weraroa and he proceeded on to No. 2 Elementary Flight Training School at New Plymouth, flying Tiger Moths. This was followed with further training on Vickers Vildebeests and Fairey Gordons at No. 2 Flight Training School at RNZAF Base Woodbourne. His training was completed in late May 1940, when having gained his flying badge the previous month, he was commissioned as a pilot officer.

=== Battle of Britain ===
Pattison was sent to England to serve with the Royal Air Force (RAF), departing New Zealand on 7 June aboard the RMS Rangitata with some fellow RNZAF pilots, including Robert Spurdle and Edward Wells. He arrived in Britain in late July, and after a short period at RAF Uxbridge was posted to No. 7 Operational Training Unit (OTU) at Hawarden. Here he converted to Supermarine Spitfires and then joined No. 266 Squadron based at Wittering on 27 August. It moved forward to Debden shortly after his arrival and it was from here he departed on his first operational flight. The squadron was tasked with intercepting a force of Luftwaffe bombers making their way over the Thames Estuary, and passing through cloud he became separated from the other Spitfires of his unit. Unable to make radio contact with the ground, he became lost, ran out of fuel and executed a wheels-up landing in a field.

On 14 September Pattison was posted to No. 92 Squadron, stationed at Biggin Hill. At the time, the Battle of Britain was at its peak and less than two weeks later, he crash landed his Spitfire at West Malling; during a dogfight over Gravesend, he had been attacked by a Messerschmitt Bf 109 fighter and received serious thigh wounds from a cannon shell. He spent the next eight months in hospital and on recovery, rejoined the squadron on 1 June 1941 having been promoted to flying officer. He was only at the squadron for a month before being posted as an instructor to No. 61 OTU. In November Pattison contravened standing orders regarding low flying and flew under the Severn railway bridge. After a court martial, he lost three months seniority.

=== Circus offensive ===
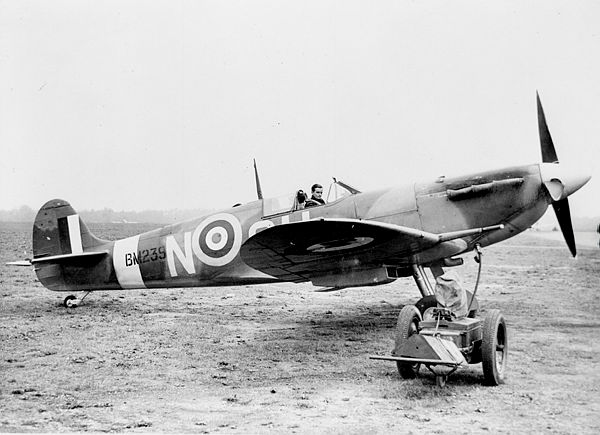
Pattison in the cockpit of his Spitfire during his service with No. 485 Squadron

Returning to operations in April 1942, Pattison was posted to No. 485 (NZ) Squadron, based at Kenley. On 26 April the squadron, providing cover for Hurribombers attacking targets in Calais, was engaged by Focke-Wulf Fw 190 fighters. During the encounter, the engine of Pattison's Spitfire was damaged. He was able to make it most of the way back across the English Channel but bailed out off the Sussex coast. He rescued by an air-sea rescue launch. Four of the squadron's pilots were shot down in the engagement, two fatally. He was promoted to flight lieutenant the following month and for most of the next twelve months would fly extensively on operations, many to France.

Stood down from operations in July 1943, Pattison was sent to No. 56 OTU in Kinnell, Scotland, as a chief flying instructor. He was also promoted to acting squadron leader. The same month, he was awarded the Distinguished Flying Cross. He returned to operations in March 1944 as a supernumerary flight lieutenant with No. 66 Squadron, which was part of No. 132 Wing. The squadron carried out a number of operations in preparation for the Invasion of Normandy and on D-Day itself, provided aerial cover for the landing beaches. A flight commander during his time with the squadron, he destroyed two German fighters over Normandy.

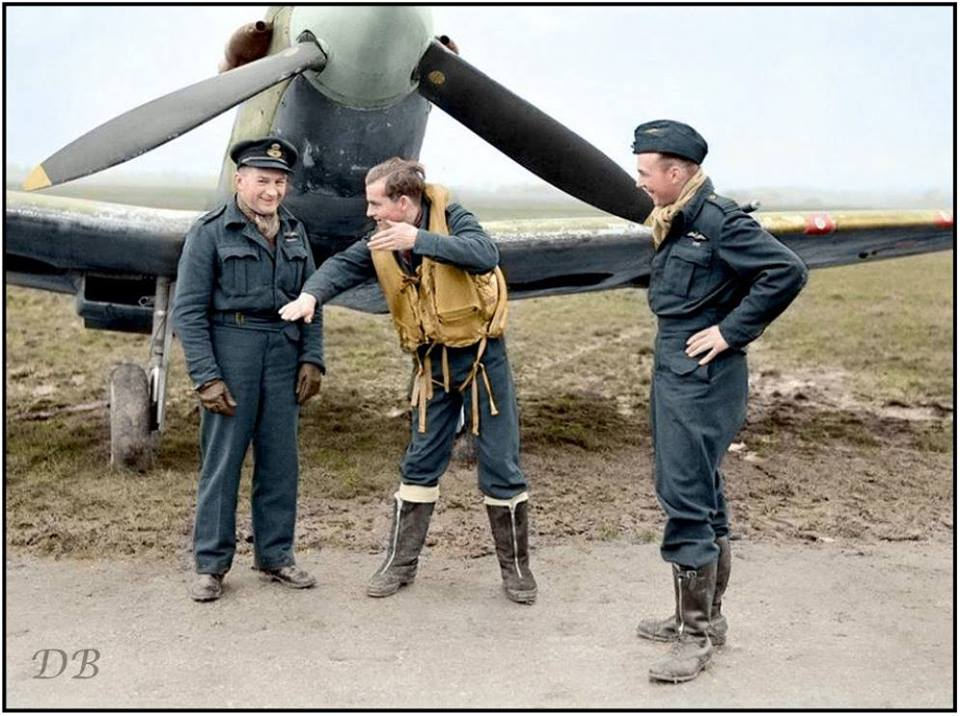
Pattison (centre) with Reg Grant (left) at RAF Westhampnett, West Sussex on 21 January 1943

Pattison, resuming his acting squadron leader rank, returned to No. 485 (NZ) Squadron, this time as its commander, in September 1944. At the time, it was operating from Merville, in France, as part of the 2nd Tactical Air Force (2TAF). He led it in numerous dive bombing missions in support of the Canadian Army's operations in France, Belgium and Holland, as they advanced along the north-east coast of the European continent, dealing with pockets of resistance and securing shipping ports. During this time it claimed many enemy ground vehicles destroyed without incurring any casualties. From early 1945, it performed reconnaissance flights towards the Rhine and it was during one of these when the first death in the squadron occurred while it was under Pattison's command. When the squadron was withdrawn from the front line in February 1945 to begin converting to the Hawker Tempest fighter, Pattison was posted to the staff at the headquarters of No. 84 Group. In May 1945, he was awarded the Distinguished Service Order in recognition of his leadership of No. 485 Squadron in its operations in Europe. The citation, published in The London Gazette read:

This officer has completed a third tour of operational duty. He has displayed the highest standard of skill and courage and throughout his devotion to duty has been unfailing. He has shown the finest qualities of leadership both in the air and on the ground and his sterling work had contributed in good measure to the success of the squadron he commands. Within recent months, Squadron Leader Pattison has destroyed very many enemy mechanical vehicles and shot down 2 enemy aircraft.

— London Gazette, No. 37070, 4 May 1945.

Part of his role at No. 84 Group was to seek out targets for the 2TAF. In early May he was sent into the Hague for the purpose of verifying information from the Dutch underground regarding potential targets. By the end of the Second World War, Pattison was based in Hanover.

== Later life ==
Pattison returned to New Zealand in January 1946 and was discharged from the RNZAF. On resuming his civilian life, he farmed at Waipawa before retiring to Havelock North. In 2004, he was awarded the Légion d'Honneur at the time of the 60th anniversary commemorations of the Normandy landings in 2004. The award was personally bestowed by the nation's then-president Jacques Chirac. Pattison himself, although surprised, was embarrassed at being honoured; he felt he was "merely flying above it" [the landing beaches] and that it was the soldiers making the landings who should have been recognised.

He died at Hastings on 11 September 2009, one of the last living of the New Zealand fighter pilots to have flown in the Battle of Britain. He was survived by four children.
