= John Houlton =

New Zealand flying ace (1922–1996)

John Arthur Houlton
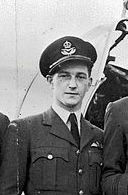
- Born: 23 September 1922; Christchurch, New Zealand
- Died: 16 April 1996 (aged 73); Whangaparaoa, New Zealand
- Military career
- Allegiance: New Zealand
- Branch: Royal New Zealand Air Force (1941–1955)
- Rank: Squadron Leader
- Nickname: Johnnie
- Conflicts: Second World War; Channel Front; Siege of Malta; Operation Overlord
- Awards: Distinguished Flying Cross

John Arthur Houlton DFC (23 September 1922 – 16 April 1996) was a New Zealand flying ace of the Royal New Zealand Air Force (RNZAF) during the Second World War. He was credited with the destruction of at least five German aircraft.

Born in Christchurch, Houlton joined the RNZAF in June 1941 and, after completing training in New Zealand, was sent to England to serve with the Royal Air Force. After a brief period of service with No. 485 (NZ) Squadron, he volunteered to go to Malta as part of the island's aerial defence. He was based there from August to December 1942 before returning to Europe and No. 485 Squadron. He shot down a German bomber on the day of the Normandy landings, often considered to be the first German aircraft destroyed during the invasion of France. After the war he stayed in the RNZAF and later took up commercial flying. He died in 1996, aged 73.

== Early life ==
John Arthur Houlton, known as Johnnie, was born in Christchurch on 23 September 1922. After his schooling was completed he worked as a clerk in the public service.

== Second World War ==
Houlton joined the Royal New Zealand Air Force (RNZAF) in June 1941 and received his initial training at Woodbourne before proceeding on to England the following year to serve with the Royal Air Force (RAF). He underwent further training at an Operational Training Unit (OTU) and was then posted as a sergeant pilot to No. 485 (NZ) Squadron in June 1942. His new unit, composed mainly of New Zealand flying personnel, operated Supermarine Spitfire Mk Vb fighters.

=== Malta ===
After a month with No. 485 Squadron, Houlton volunteered to serve on Malta. He deployed to the Mediterranean on the aircraft carrier HMS Furious, which was taking part in Operation Pedestal, a supply convoy bound for Malta. He flew a Spitfire off the flight deck of Furious and landed on the island on 11 August. He served with No. 185 Squadron but had periods of ill-health and on one flight in September, a search and rescue mission for a downed pilot, experienced sinusitis. It was not until several weeks had elapsed after his arrival before he had an encounter with the Luftwaffe, when, while the squadron was returning from a dive-bombing raid on Gela, in Sicily, he intercepted and damaged a pair of Junkers Ju 52 transports on 28 November. He was admonished by his squadron commander afterwards for breaking formation when making his attack. In early December he was criticised again, this time for poor aircraft recognition, when he was involved in a friendly fire incident. He and three other pilots were on a reconnaissance flight when they attacked a Hawker Hurricane fighter of the Fleet Air Arm off the Italian island of Lampedusa. Houlton, having already damaged the Hurricane, broke off the attack when he realised his error. In the mission briefing the pilots had been advised that there would be no friendly aircraft in the area. The damaged Hurricane was able to return to Malta; it transpired that its pilot was flying over Lampedusa contrary to his orders. Houlton returned to England the following month.

=== Channel Front ===
In January 1943, Houlton was posted to No. 602 Squadron but had only been with the unit a few weeks when he transferred back to No. 485 Squadron, at the behest of its commander, Squadron Leader Reg Grant. Soon afterwards he received a temporary commission as a pilot officer. Over the summer period, the squadron flew extensively as part of the Biggin Hill fighter wing. The New Zealanders flew operations nearly every day, sometimes two or more daily. Many of these were 'Ramrod' raids, which involved bombers attacking targets in France, distracting the Luftwaffe while a main raid was mounted on locations elsewhere. The Spitfire squadrons, which had a shorter operational range, escorted the bombers making their way to France while North American P-51 Mustangs and Republic P-47 Thunderbolts, having greater fuel endurance, accompanied the main force.

On 27 August, flying a Spitfire Mk IX, Houlton destroyed a Focke-Wulf Fw 190 fighter over St Pol. The next month he shared in the destruction of another Fw 190 and also damaged a Messerschmitt Bf 109 fighter. He received a further promotion in September, to flying officer. The squadron had a period of reduced operations in Scotland with No. 12 Group over the winter period before returning to the south of England in February as part of the RAF's Second Tactical Air Force. The 2nd TAF had been raised to provide air cover protection and support during the operations of the Second British Army and the First Canadian Army during the impending invasion of France. Accordingly, it began training in the appropriate tactics, including operating in a fighter-bomber role. The squadron returned to operations in March, carrying out bomber escorts and sweeps to France.

=== Europe ===
On the day of the Normandy landings, there were only a few aerial encounters with the Luftwaffe for the RAF, Houlton having one of them. Leading a section of Spitfires in an afternoon patrol over the landing beaches, Houlton destroyed a Junkers Ju 88 medium bomber. This was alleged to be the first enemy aircraft shot down on D-Day. However, it is likely that RAF de Havilland Mosquitos had destroyed some enemy aircraft earlier in the day, before dawn. With the three other pilots of his section, he also shared in the destruction of a second Ju 88. Two days later he destroyed a Bf 109 near Caen. Another Bf 109 was shot down on 12 June near Aunay-sur-Odon and at the end of the month he claimed a further Bf 109 as damaged.

In July Houlton was taken off operations and seconded to the Ministry of Aircraft Production. In the preceding weeks No. 485 Squadron had been involved in the development of a new gyroscopic gunsight and Houlton embarked on a lecture tour around the various factories involved in its production. He returned to the squadron in August and shortly afterwards it began operating from airfields in France, supporting the First Canadian Army in its advance along the coast of France and the Low Countries. In September, he was awarded the Distinguished Flying Cross (DFC). The citation, published in the London Gazette read:

Flying Officer Houlton has completed a very large number of varied sorties and has displayed notable skill and determination throughout. He has shot down four enemy aircraft, three of them within a short period recently.

— London Gazette, No. 36686, 5 September 1944

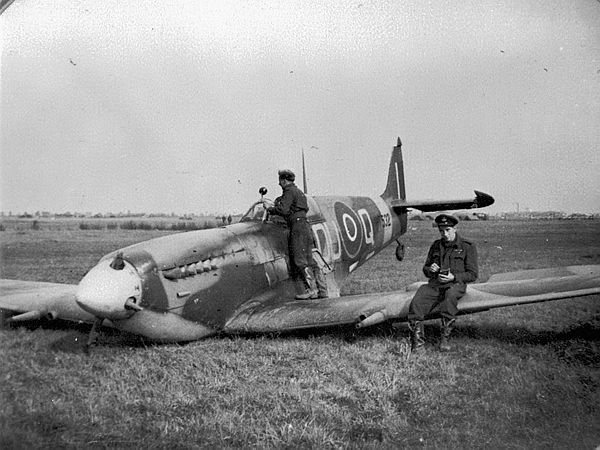
A Spitfire of No. 485 Squadron which made a belly-landing; Houlton sits on its wing

Houlton then had a period off operations in England, where he attended the Fighter Leaders school and then proceeded on to the Central Gunnery School at Sutton Bridge for more training. A period of instructing duties at an OTU followed before he was promoted to flight lieutenant and returned to operations in Europe with No. 274 Squadron. He was a flight commander with his new unit, which flew the Hawker Tempest and on 3 May 1945 he shot down a Dornier Do 217 bomber that was on route for Norway.

At the end of the war, Houlton was credited with shooting down at least five German aircraft, two shared as destroyed and four damaged. It is possible that he actually destroyed seven aircraft; the two Ju 52 transport aircraft that he claimed as damaged on 28 November 1942 are believed to have crashed into the sea.

== Later life ==
Promoted to squadron leader in July, Houlton stayed in the RNZAF in the postwar period and was commander of No. 41 Squadron from 1952 to 1955. He then started commercial flying, and this led to him establishing the Agricultural Pilot's Association of New Zealand in 1965. He worked for the New Zealand Defence Department, managing its field station on Great Barrier Island for a number of years until 1983.

In his retirement, he wrote his autobiography, Spitfire Strikes, which was published in 1985 by John Murray. The Spitfire that he had flown during the Normandy landings was the subject of a restoration by Nick Grace. In 1986, Houlton was involved with a television documentary concerning the restored aircraft. It was flown by Grace's widow Carolyn and subsequently her son Richard in numerous airshows and aerial displays, carrying the markings representing Houlton's Spitfire. His final years were spent living in Whangaparaoa in Auckland, where he died on 16 April 1996. His ashes are interred at North Shore Memorial Park in Auckland.

His medals which, as well as the DFC, included the 1939–1945 Star, Air Crew Europe Star with France and Germany clasp, Africa Star with North Africa 1942–43 clasp, War Medal 1939–1945, and New Zealand War Service Medal, were held privately but came up for auction in April 2018, where they were expected to make £5,000 under the hammer. On the day of the auction, the medals sold for £7,000.
