= Jack Rae =

New Zealand Second World War flying ace (1919–2007)

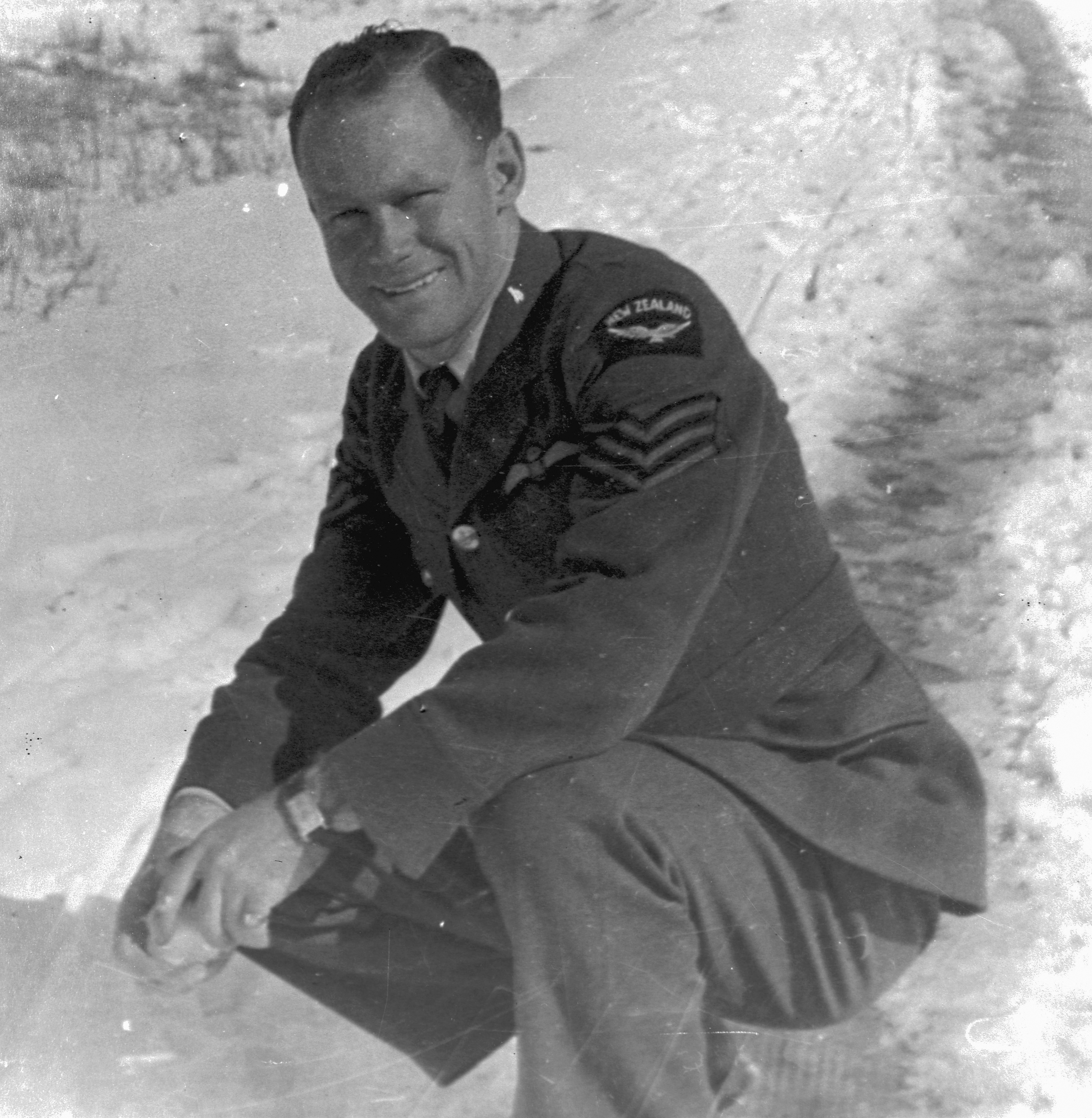
- Born: John Donald Rae; 15 January 1919; Auckland, New Zealand
- Died: 19 December 2007 (aged 88); Kerikeri, New Zealand
- Military career
- Allegiance: New Zealand
- Branch: Royal New Zealand Air Force
- Service years: 1940–1946
- Rank: Flight Lieutenant
- Nickname: JD
- Units: No. 485 (New Zealand) Squadron; No. 603 Squadron; No. 249 Squadron
- Conflicts: Second World War; Channel Dash; Siege of Malta; Channel Front
- Awards: Distinguished Flying Cross & Bar

John Donald Rae, DFC & Bar (15 January 1919 – 19 December 2007) was a flying ace of the Royal New Zealand Air Force (RNZAF) during the Second World War. He was officially credited with the destruction of twelve enemy aircraft, as well as eight probably destroyed and six damaged.

Born and educated in Auckland, Rae joined the RNZAF following the outbreak of the Second World War. Rae was posted to England in 1941 to serve with the Royal Air Force, and he flew Supermarine Spitfires over the Channel Front with No. 485 (New Zealand) Squadron. In April 1942, he was attached to No. 603 Squadron, which was tasked with flying Spitfires from the American aircraft carrier USS Wasp to the island of Malta. He then served on Malta with No. 249 Squadron before being repatriated to England due to wounds. Once recovered, he served as a flying instructor before rejoining No. 485 Squadron, still serving on the Channel Front, in May 1943. He was forced down over France a few months later and became a prisoner of war. After the war, he established a business manufacturing clothing and spent his later years living in Kerikeri. He died in 2007, aged 88.

== Early life ==
John Donald Rae, known as Jack or JD, was born in Auckland, New Zealand, on 15 January 1919, the son of Ethelbert Charles Rae and his wife, Helena Annie Rae née McLeod. He was educated at Cornwall Park School and then at Auckland Grammar. When he finished his schooling, he took up employment as a stonemason.

== Second World War ==
The Second World War had been under way for several months before Rae joined the Royal New Zealand Air Force (RNZAF) in September 1940. After completing his flight training in New Zealand in March 1941, he was sent to England to serve with the Royal Air Force (RAF). Ranked sergeant pilot, he was posted to the RAF's No. 485 (New Zealand) Squadron in mid-July 1941. The squadron had been formed earlier in the year and its flying personnel were mainly New Zealanders but with British administrative staff and ground crew. Rae considered himself lucky to have been posted to the unit. By the time he arrived, it was operating Spitfire Mk. IIs from Redhill airfield as part of No. 11 Group's Kenley Wing. The squadron soon received an improved model of Spitfire, the Mk. V.

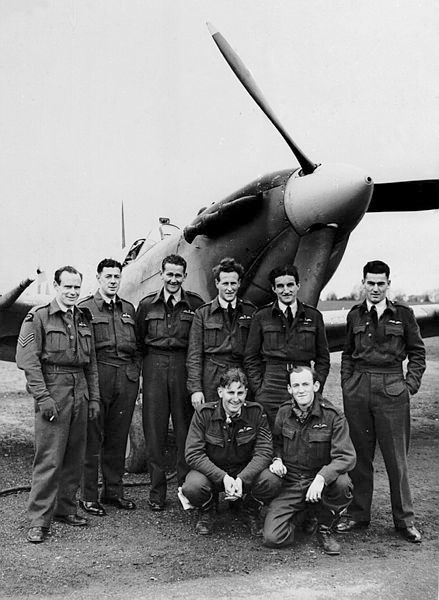
Some pilots of No. 485 Squadron's B flight, 1942, with Jack Rae standing on the left

Rae, who decorated his Spitfire with the emblem of his former high school, Auckland Grammar, regularly flew with the squadron on escort missions over France. On one such mission, while protecting bombers targeting Gosnay on 9 August, he came close to running out of fuel and just made the return flight to England, setting down on a grass airstrip where other aircraft were parked. He discovered that these were decoys, the airfield a deception to fool German reconnaissance flights. Receiving directions from a local farmer, he took off and landed at a nearby RAF base, running out of fuel on his landing. He shot down his first German aircraft, a Messerschmitt Bf 109 fighter, a few days later on 12 August. He destroyed another Bf 109 over Gravelines on 19 August.

On 12 February 1942, No. 485 Squadron was tasked with escorting torpedo-bombers attempting to disrupt the Channel Dash by the German battleships Scharnhorst and Gneisenau. Unable to rendezvous with the torpedo-bombers due to poor weather conditions, the squadron was instructed to proceed to the battleships. Encountering fighters as they approached, Rae engaged and damaged one Bf 109. He shot down a Focke-Wulf Fw 190 fighter the next month, on 28 March.

=== Malta ===
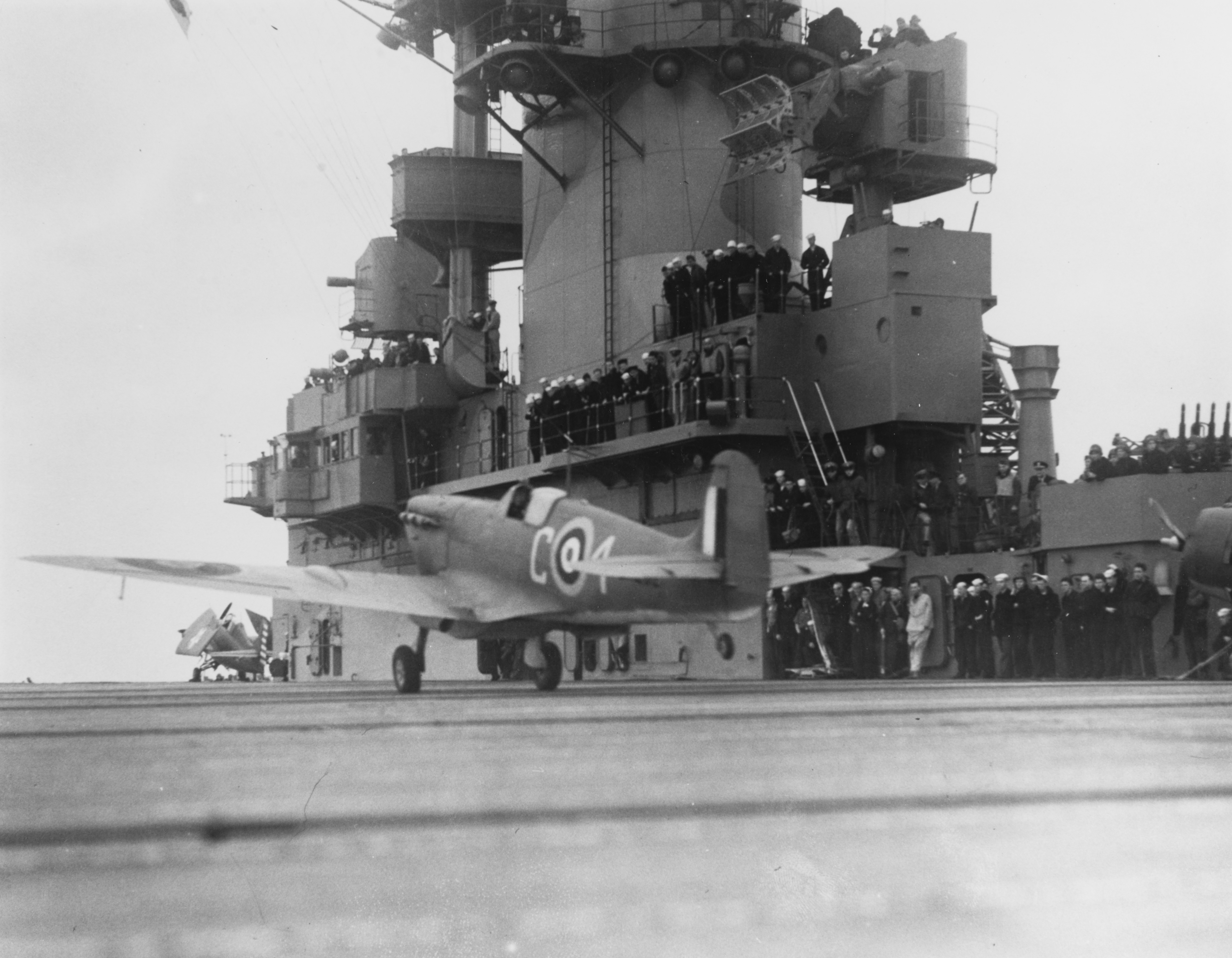
A Spitfire, bound for Malta, taking off from the flight deck of the USS Wasp

In April 1942, as part of Operation Calendar, Rae was attached to No. 603 Squadron, which was tasked with delivering Spitfires to Malta to reinforce the aerial defences of the island. Embarking on the USS Wasp, he flew a Spitfire from the carrier's flight deck and landed at the RAF base at Tekali, Malta, on 20 April. According to Rae, he was ordered to change from his assigned aircraft to another shortly before takeoff; this left him with no time to remove the extra supplies of cigarettes and canned food he had stowed in the Spitfire but the pilot who took over his aircraft also landed safely at Malta and Rae was able to retrieve his goods. Shortly after Rae's arrival, the airfield was raided and two of the Spitfires destroyed. The squadron remained on the island as part of its defence and Rae flew his first mission on 22 April, a scramble to intercept raiding enemy aircraft, during which his gunsight failed.

On 1 May, Rae was part of a group of four Spitfires scrambled to deal with an incoming Italian bombing raid. They were instead met with Bf 109s, one of which damaged his aircraft. Wounded in the leg, Rae had to bail out over the sea 7 miles (11 km) from Malta. The prevailing breeze carried him to the island, where he landed near Rabat and encountered an aggressive Maltese farmer armed with a shotgun. Rae later recounted he was only saved from harm when British soldiers turned up.

After recovering from his wounds, Rae was posted to No. 249 Squadron, which also operated Spitfires at Malta. He flew his first patrol with his new squadron on 5 June. He damaged a Bf 109 on 12 June when scrambled along with three others to meet approaching German fighters. Several days later, Rae encountered Italian fighters and shot down a Reggiane Re.2001 and damaged another. He destroyed an Italian CANT Z.1007 bomber on 4 July, one of three attempting to bomb Grand Harbour. Rae shot down a Bf 109 on 7 July and a Macchi C.202 fighter two days later. He shot down another C.202 on 13 July when No. 249 Squadron was called upon to assist in dealing with a large bombing raid on Luqa.

On 27 July, Rae claimed a probable Bf 109 and a damaged C.202 during an interception of another bombing raid on Luqa. He shared in the probable destruction of a Junkers Ju 88 bomber the next day. He also damaged a second Ju 88. By the end of the month, the wounds to his leg had become infected and Rae was hospitalised and eventually repatriated to the United Kingdom for treatment. By this time, he had been promoted to pilot officer.

=== Channel Front ===
After convalescing from the wounds received on Malta, Rae had a period of leave. He attended a Flying Instructor's School and was posted as an instructor to No. 57 Operational Training Unit. In December 1942 he was awarded the Distinguished Flying Cross (DFC) for his service while operating from Malta. The citation, published in the London Gazette, recognised:

...gallantry and devotion to duty in the execution of air operations.

— London Gazette, No. 35809, 4 December 1942

In May 1943, Rae rejoined No. 485 Squadron, by now operating out of Biggin Hill, as a flying officer. According to Rae, this was at the behest of the squadron's commander at the time, Reg Grant, who departed shortly afterwards for a rest. If not for this, Rae believed that he would have been posted to Canada as an instructor. Now back on operations, Rae shared in the destruction of a Fw 190 on 27 July and received the sole credit for shooting down a Bf 109 on 9 August, when his section of four Spitfires, led by Squadron Leader Johnny Checketts, accounted for seven Me 109s. On 17 August, while flying cover for a bombing raid being carried out by Martin Marauders, he shot down two Me 109s. During an escort mission on 22 August, the squadron was surprised by 50 or 60 German fighters. Rae destroyed a Fw 190 but was one of four New Zealanders shot down; he force landed in France and became a prisoner of war (POW). Other pilots in the squadron confirmed Rae's aerial victory on their return to base. Rae had been due to be promoted and made a flight commander in another squadron. He had also been recommended by Checketts for a bar to his DFC; not long after Rae's capture, this award was promulgated. The published citation read:

Flying Officer Rae is an outstanding and determined pilot. He has undertaken many sorties displaying gallant leadership and great skill. Within recent weeks, Flying Officer Rae has shot down 4 enemy aircraft, bringing his total victories to at least 11. He has displayed exceptional keenness and devotion to duty.

— London Gazette, No. 36183, 24 September 1943

Rae was incarcerated at Stalag Luft III, a POW camp well to the southeast of Berlin, in what is now Żagań, Poland. He made an escape attempt that led to his being placed in solitary confinement for a time. This meant that he was not involved in the subsequent Great Escape, during which 50 escapees who were recaptured were murdered. As the war drew to a close, the POWs at Stalag Luft III were force marched deeper into Germany. They were liberated by the advancing Allied forces near Hamburg at the end of the war. Like many other former POWs, Rae struggled to adjust to normal life once he was back in England. In London for VE Day, he found the crowds there to be overwhelming and sought peace and quiet instead.

Repatriated to New Zealand, Rae was discharged from the RNZAF in 1946 as a flight lieutenant, having been promoted while in captivity. He ended the war with sole credit for eleven enemy aircraft destroyed and a half share in the destruction of two more for a total of twelve victories. He was also credited with eight probable enemy aircraft destroyed and six damaged.

== Later life ==
Returning to civilian life, Rae married Vera Grant; she was the sister of Reg Grant, a wing commander in the RNZAF who had been killed during the war. With Vera, he set up and ran a factory manufacturing clothing. He was also involved in volunteer work, particularly for the International Red Cross, which had provided aid when he was a POW in Germany. He was also a Rotarian, and spent his final years in Kerikeri. His memoirs, titled Kiwi Spitfire Ace, were published by Grub Street in 2001. Rae died in Kerikeri on 19 December 2007, survived by four children. His wife had predeceased him.
