= No. 485 Squadron RNZAF =

No. 485 (NZ) Squadron RAF
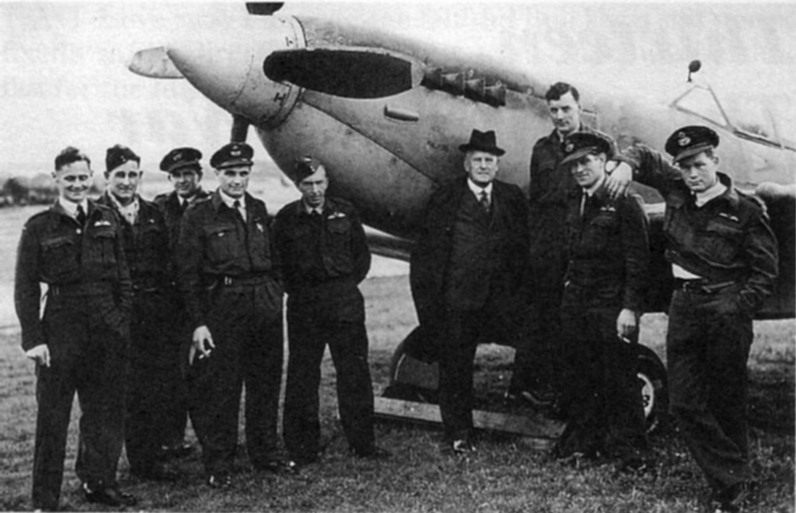
- Pilots of the squadron with NZ High Commissioner Bill Jordan circa 1944
- Active: 1 March 1941 – 26 August 1945
- Country: United Kingdom
- Allegiance: New Zealand
- Branch: Royal Air Force
- Role: Fighter
- Garrison/HQ: RAF Driffield, RAF Redhill
- Mottos: Māori: Ka Whawhai Tonu ("We Will Fight On")
- Equipment: Supermarine Spitfire
- Engagements: Second World War: Channel Front; Channel Dash; Dieppe Raid; Invasion of Normandy

Insignia
- Squadron Badge: A demi Māori warrior holding a Taiaha
- Squadron Codes: OU (Mar 1941 – Aug 1945)

No. 485 (NZ) Squadron was a fighter squadron established for service during the Second World War. It was the first New Zealand squadron formed under Article XV of the Empire Air Training Plan. Although many of its flying personnel were largely drawn from the Royal New Zealand Air Force, the squadron served in Europe under the operational and administrative command of the Royal Air Force.

Formed in March 1941 and equipped with Supermarine Spitfires, No. 485 Squadron became operational the following month, initially flying patrols protecting convoys making their way through the North Sea. It was soon doing bomber escort duties and carrying out sweeps designed to draw out the Luftwaffe from their airfields in France. In February 1942, it was involved in the Channel Dash, attempting to disrupt the aerial cover provided by the Luftwaffe for the German battleships Scharnhorst and Gneisenau. Later in the year it helped cover the Dieppe Raid. From mid- to late-1943 it flew extensively as part of the Biggin Hill fighter wing. Early the following year it became part of the 2nd Tactical Air Force and switched to a fighter-bomber role. In the run up to D-Day, it attacked numerous military targets in Normandy. On the day of the invasion, it provided aerial cover for some of the landing beaches. For much of the rest of the year it carried out operations supporting the advance of the First Canadian Army in Northwest Europe. In the final months of the war, it was often engaged in attacking ground targets, rarely encountering the Luftwaffe. It was disbanded in August 1945.

== Background ==
In the mid-1930s, the Royal Air Force (RAF) was in the process of expanding and required an increasing number of suitable flying personnel. A number of schemes were implemented for New Zealanders to obtain short-service commissions in the RAF with the intention of then transferring to the Royal New Zealand Air Force (RNZAF) in the future. This led to over 500 New Zealanders serving in the RAF by the time of the outbreak of the Second World War.

At around the same time there was discussion between the governments of Britain, Australia, Canada and New Zealand to facilitate the co-ordination of training of air crew in the event of hostilities. This led to the implementation of the Empire Air Training Scheme (ETAS) in December 1939. Under this agreement, the RNZAF was to initially supply 880 full trained pilots for attachment to the RAF, with another 520 pilots being trained to an elementary standard annually. As each of the Dominion governments desired its personnel to serve together, the ETAS also had a clause, Article XV, that required the British Air Ministry to establish, pay and equip new squadrons belonging officially to the three Dominion air forces, for service within RAF formations. In theory, the Dominions would supply the ground crew as well as flying personnel for these "Article XV squadrons". However, in New Zealand's case, there was a reluctance to maintain fully-fledged RNZAF squadrons in Britain, so the decision was made to allow for the formation of squadrons within the RAF designated as being New Zealand. The New Zealand Article XV squadrons were formed around a cadre of New Zealand flying personnel already serving in the RAF, supplemented by newly trained pilots from the RNZAF, while their administrative and ground crew were predominantly British.

== Formation ==
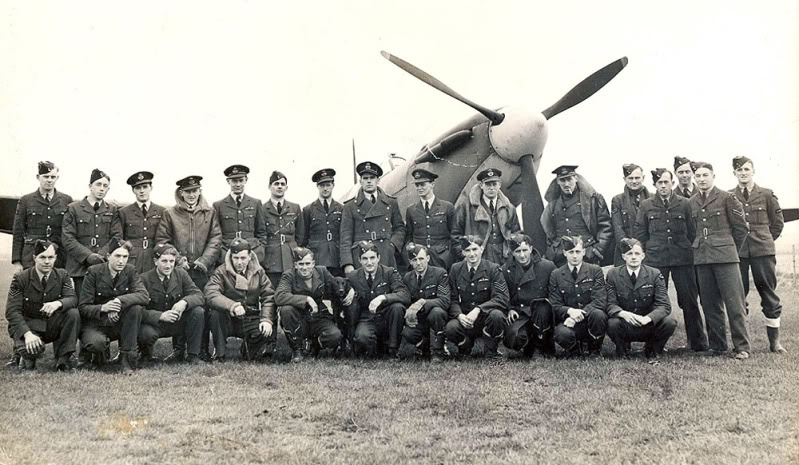
No. 485 (NZ) Squadron members in 1941; its commander, Marcus Knight, stands in the centre of the back row, wearing a greatcoat

No. 485 (NZ) Squadron was the first of the New Zealand Article XV squadrons, formed on 1 March 1941 at RAF Driffield, in Yorkshire. Its first commander was Squadron Leader Marcus Knight, a pilot from Dannevirke who had joined the RAF in 1935. Following the outbreak of the war, he had spent several months as a flying instructor before taking a fighter pilots course at No. 57 Operational Training Unit in December 1940. He then flew Hawker Hurricanes with No. 257 Squadron and No. 310 Squadron prior to being appointed commander of No. 485 Squadron. The two flight commanders, Frank Brinsden, who was a veteran of the Battle of Britain, and John Martin, were experienced pilots, and among the other personnel were Pilot Officers Edwards Wells and Bill Crawford-Compton. While the majority of the pilots that flew with the squadron during the war were New Zealanders, at times its flying personnel included Britons, Canadians and Australians, and even briefly, an American of the United States Army Air Force. There were some ground crew from New Zealand as well, although the majority were British.

Allocated the code letters OU, the squadron was equipped with Supermarine Spitfire Mk Is for its working up period. Although there was an experienced cadre of pilots, the rest were novice pilots of the RNZAF who had trained in New Zealand on old biplanes, such as the Vickers Vildebeest, and needed time to become acquainted with the modern Spitfire. These novices accounted for nearly half of the 25 flying personnel that made up the squadron by the start of April.

The squadron became operational in mid-April 1941, initially tasked with carrying out convoy patrols over the North Sea. Its first weeks of duty were quiet and towards the end of the month, it moved to Leconfield and its Spitfire Mk Is were exchanged for newer Mk IIs. Its first aerial victory was achieved in the evening of 3 June when Knight, leading a flight of four Spitfires, intercepted and destroyed a Junkers Ju 88 medium bomber that was attacking a convoy off the Yorkshire coast. The Ju 88 was seen to go down into the sea off Cleethorpes.

== Channel Front ==
=== 1941 ===
By the mid-June, the squadron was taking part in offensive operations across the English Channel to France. The RAF had started these in December the previous year as a way of taking the fight to the Luftwaffe and then expanded them to what were called 'Circus' raids in which a small number of RAF bombers were used as bait to draw up enemy fighters. On other occasions large scale sweeps would be mounted by the RAF fighters to northern France, again to draw out the Luftwaffe. Smaller scale operations, carried out by roving sections and flights, targeted shipping, port facilities and airfields.

Initially, the squadron provided detachments that were sent south to an airfield of Fighter Command's No. 11 Group and from there joined up with one of the fighter wings heading to France on a Circus raid. Its first combat loss was on one of these missions. Flying on 23 June as part of the Wittering Wing accompanying Bristol Blenheims on a bombing raid on a power station at Chocques, it saw no action until it turned back to the United Kingdom at which several Messerschmitt Bf 109 fighters intercepted the squadron. A Spitfire was shot down off the French coast and its pilot killed.

On 1 July, the squadron moved to Redhill, a satellite airfield of Kenley. It took a more permanent role in the offensive against the Luftwaffe in northern France as part of the Kenley Wing, alongside Nos. 452 and 602 Squadrons. Wells shot down a Bf 109 on 5 July, the first claim over France for the squadron, while escorting Short Stirling heavy bombers on a raid to Lille. The squadron ended up being involved in 22 Circus raids over the course of the month but also did convoy patrols and provided protection for air-sea rescues. By the end of the month, five enemy aircraft had been destroyed although for the loss of seven pilots.

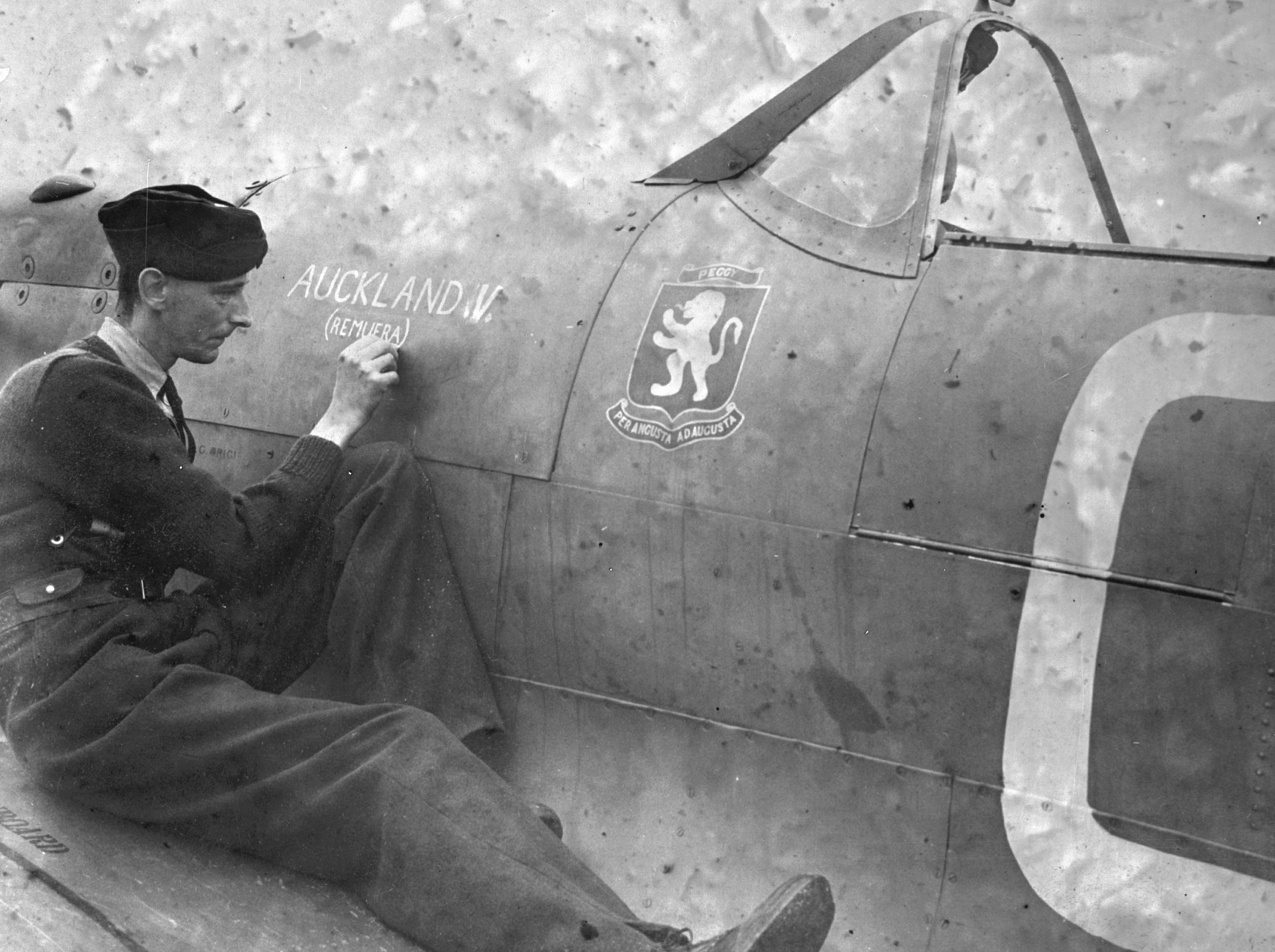
A member of No. 485 Squadron's ground crew marking up one of the Spitfires paid for through a public subscription in New Zealand

Starting in August the squadron began to receive the upgraded Spitfire Mk Vb. At least 20 of the new aircraft had been paid for by a subscription fund in which citizens of New Zealand and Pacific Island 'Protectorates' could participate. Most of these aircraft bore the names of New Zealand provinces stenciled on the aircraft, just ahead of the cockpit. One bore the initials WDFUNZ, in recognition of the fundraising efforts of the Women's Division Farmers Union New Zealand. Operations to France continued through the month, the squadron often flying twice a day. They began to encounter the newly introduced Focke-Wulf Fw 190 fighter, superior in performance to their Spitfire Mk Vbs and, together with the Germans implementing an improved raid detection system, this advantaged the Luftwaffe in its aerial engagements with the RAF. At the end of the month, the squadron was involved in Operation Iliad, designed to draw out the Luftwaffe into combat. Two non-operational and obsolete destroyers were taken to the English Channel and the squadron mounted standing patrols over the ships for nearly two hours, ready to intercept any enemy aircraft attempting to attack. The Germans did not take the bait.

At times there was tension between the New Zealanders and the reportedly more successful Australian No. 452 Squadron that was also part of the Kenley Wing. There were suspicions that the Australians were overstating their claims of aerial victories and Wells was spurred so far as to complain to the station commander, Wing Commander Prickman. His complaint was dismissed as sour grapes. Weather began to affect operations and only seven circuses were flown by the New Zealanders in September and three in October. The squadron's last operation from Redhill, a sweep to St. Omer which saw two Bf 109s damaged, was carried out on 21 October. It then shifted to Kenley, swapping with No. 452 Squadron which went to Redhill. In November, Wells succeeded Knight as commander of No. 485 Squadron.

By this stage the effectiveness of the German aerial defences was resulting in high casualties in Fighter Command and together with the winter weather this saw an end to the Circus raids for the time being. The squadron flew in the last Circus raid of the year, on 8 November, proving high cover for 12 Blenheims attacking railway facilities at Lille. The last operation of the year for the New Zealanders was providing aerial cover for minesweepers working in the North Sea. A Ju 88 that attempted to bomb the ships was intercepted and driven off although the Spitfire that did so was damaged. Its pilot bailed out and was collected by one of the minesweepers. The squadron ended the year credited with 18 enemy aircraft destroyed, six probably destroyed and 12 damaged.

=== 1942 ===
Particularly poor weather meant there was little operational flying for the early part of 1942 but on 12 February, the squadron flew a mission to target the fighter screen put up by the Luftwaffe to cover the Channel Dash by the German battleships Scharnhorst and Gneisenau. The squadron was split into three flights, with two flights dispatched to deal with German fighters spotted between the ships and the Belgian coast while the other, led by Wells, flew the seaward side of the battleships. Four Bf 109s were destroyed, another was probably destroyed and Wells' flight strafed a Kriegsmarine E-boat to the point of sinking. While the RAF lost 37 aircraft in its efforts to attack the German fleet, none were from the squadron and its exploits were widely reported.

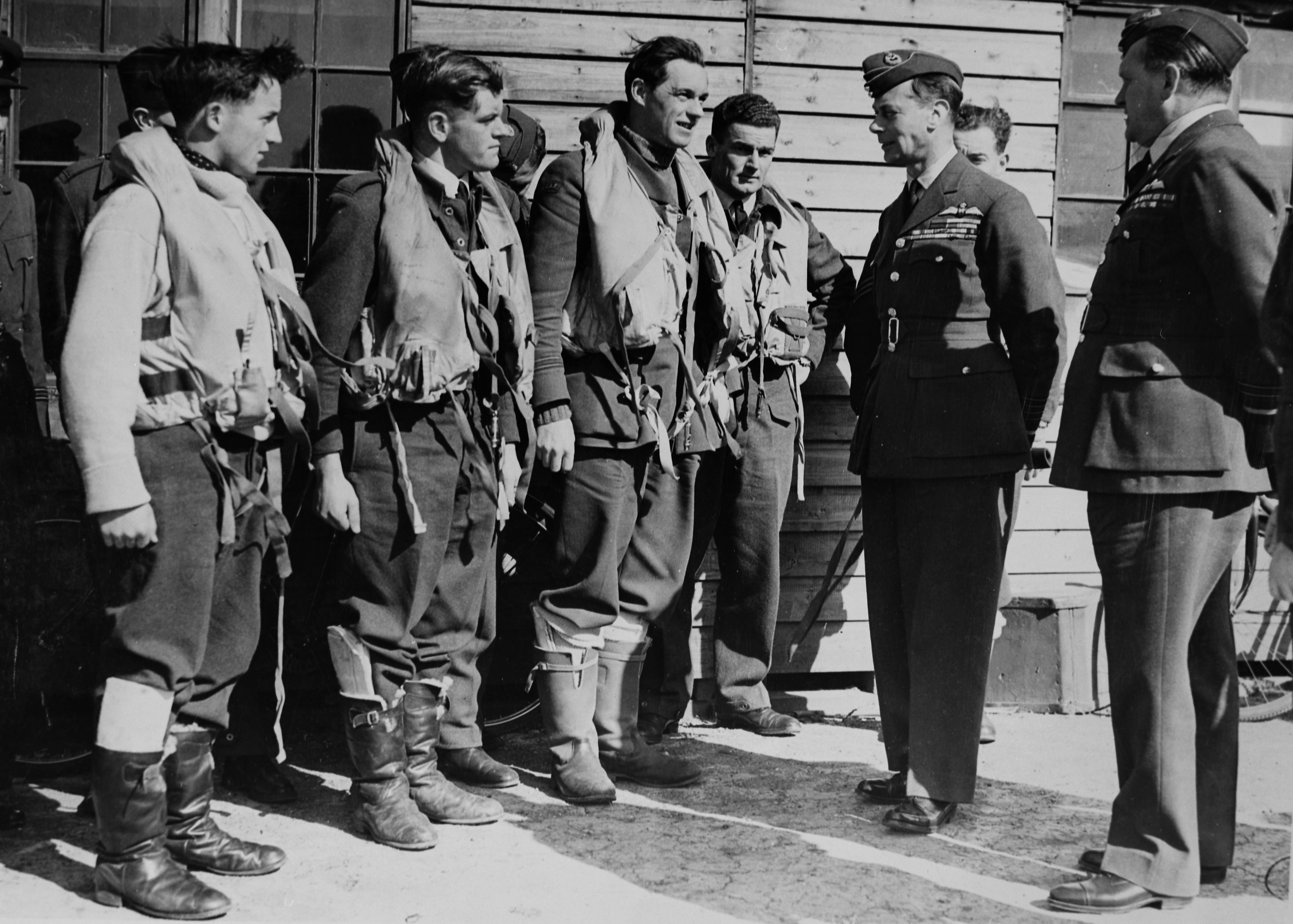
King George VI talking to pilots of No. 485 Squadron, on the occasion of his visit of 29 April 1942

In March the RAF's Circus operations and fighter sweeps to France resumed. In April the squadron, still part of Kenley Wing, flew on 26 missions; Wells occasionally flew as the wing leader. At the end of the month, King George VI visited Kenley to observe the squadron while it was on an operation to France. Although a quiet mission had been planned, the New Zealanders were engaged by the Luftwaffe and a dogfight ensued. While all returned, a few with minor injuries or damaged aircraft, the King, listening in on the radio during the engagement heard surprisingly frank language being used and commented on this later with the returned pilots.

Wells was promoted to wing commander and appointed to command of the Kenley Wing in early May 1942. Newly promoted Squadron Leader Reg Grant took over command of No. 485 Squadron. The squadron had suffered a number of casualties late the previous month due to the increasing numbers of Fw 190 fighters being encountered and this trend continued with a number of pilots being killed or bailing out over France and becoming prisoners of war. Soon the Circus operations were abandoned and Fighter Command switched to mounting smaller, synchronised raids on variety of different targets. The squadron was not as fully engaged in these, as they had yet to receive the new Spitfire Mk IX, and instead were used for convoy patrols and close escort missions. The New Zealanders were withdrawn to Kings Cliffe, in No. 12 Group, in July for a period of less demanding duties of convoy patrols over the North Sea. However, it was still called upon to carry small scale low level sweeps, termed 'Rhubarbs' and involving two to six aircraft at a time, to northern France and the Low Countries.

No. 485 Squadron was one of the 66 fighter squadrons tasked with providing aerial cover for the Dieppe Raid on 19 August. It was part of a wing of three squadrons, under the command of Wing Commander Patrick Jameson, especially formed for the Dieppe Raid. Jameson flew with the squadron for a total of four patrols; once during the landings as fighter cover, and then three times during the withdrawal. On the first, one of its pilots shot down a Fw 190 as did Jameson. The next two patrols were quiet but the last saw it intercepting German bombers that targeted ships in the English Channel. In October the squadron operated from Ballyhalbert in Northern Ireland for three weeks, proving aerial cover for ships leaving the northwestern ports of the United Kingdom with the Allied invasion force for Operation Torch, the invasion of French North Africa. It then returned to Kings Cliffe and resumed its duties with No. 12 Group. A highlight at the end of the year was the return to the squadron of two pilots, Stanley Browne and Garry Barnett, that had been shot down over France earlier in the year but managed to escape capture.

=== 1943 ===
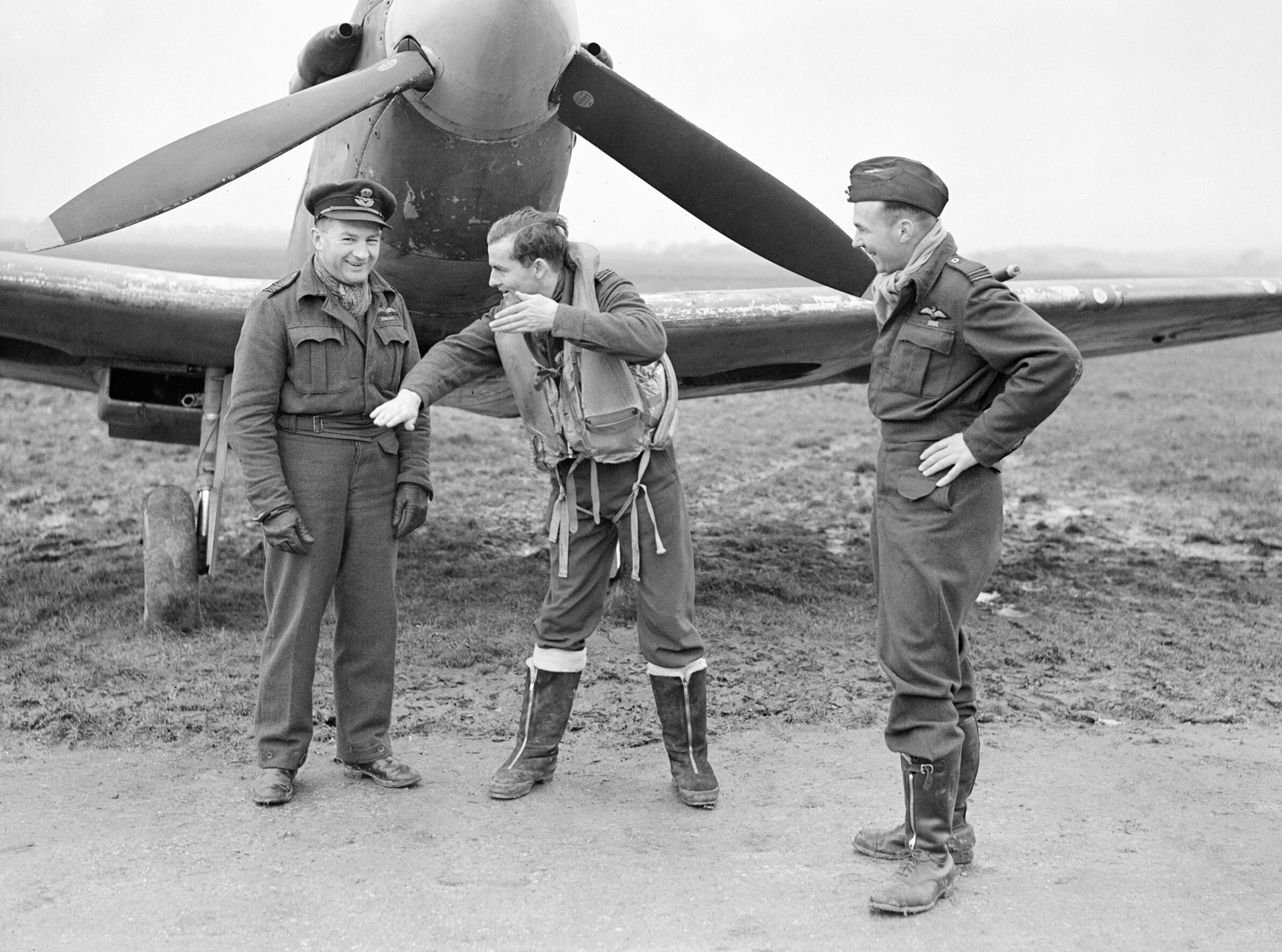
John Pattison demonstrates a dogfight to Squadron Leader Reg Grant, while Reg Baker looks on, 21 January 1943

At the start of 1943, No. 485 Squadron, still equipped with Spitfire Vbs, moved to RAF Westhampnett which was a satellite airfield of Tangmere, a No. 11 Group station. Now part of the Tangmere Wing alongside Nos. 610 and 165 Squadrons, they continued with their patrol work and escort duties as these types of missions meant that they were less likely to encounter the Fw 190s. The occasional Rhubarb was flown but by February these were reduced and instead were allocated to squadrons operating Hawker Hurricanes and the new Hawker Typhoon. The following month Grant was posted to Canada on instructing duties for a rest, having flown 150 missions. He was replaced by Squadron Leader Reg Baker, who had been with the squadron for 18 months.

In June, a contingent of pilots were detached to Scotland to practice takeoffs and landings on "dummy" aircraft carrier decks. They then moved to Ayr and flew Supermarine Seafire Mk Ibs from the training carrier HMS Argus. At the end of the month, the squadron shifted to Biggin Hill, one of Fighter Command's best-known bases. The unit, now commanded by Squadron Leader Johnny Checketts, commenced operating the Spitfire Mk IXb. Checketts had previously flown with the squadron in 1942 and then served with No. 611 Squadron as a flight commander.

With its new Spitfires, No. 485 Squadron had a busy summer flying as part of the Biggin Hill Wing, alongside the Free French No. 341 Squadron. Over the July–August period, the New Zealanders flew operations nearly every day, sometimes two or more daily. Many of these were 'Ramrod' raids, which involved bombers attacking targets in France, diverting Luftwaffe resources while a main raid was mounted on locations elsewhere. The Spitfire squadrons, which had a shorter operational range, escorted the bombers making their way to France while North American P-51 Mustangs and Republic P-47 Thunderbolts, having greater fuel endurance, accompanied the main force. During this time the squadron destroyed the most enemy aircraft of any squadron of No. 11 Group; on one occasion, 27 July, four German fighters were destroyed. This resulted in a congratulatory telegram from Winston Churchill the next day. This was bettered on 9 August; while escorting B-26 Marauders bombers on their return to England after a bombing raid, a section led by Checketts encountered eight Bf 109s that had not noticed their approach. He destroyed three of them, while the other three pilots of the section shot down one each.

On 22 August the squadron suffered its worst day; during a high cover escort mission for B-26 Marauders, over 50 German fighters attacked the Biggin Hill Wing. Four of the squadron's pilots were shot down with two enemy aircraft shot down in return. One of the pilots lost was Jack Rae, who had destroyed at least eleven enemy aircraft by that stage of the war; he became a prisoner of war. Checketts was shot down the next month but despite receiving burns to his hands and face, he was able to link up with the French Resistance. With their help he, and another pilot of the squadron who had also been shot down and avoided capture, was able to return to England via a fishing boat in October.

Squadron Leader Martin Hume took command of No. 485 Squadron after the loss of Checketts and it continued with its escort duties and patrols to France. Pilots continued to be killed during this time, one being Warrant Officer Bert Wipiti, a Māori who had flown with the RNZAF's No. 488 Squadron in Malaya earlier in the war. In mid-October, the squadron shifted to Hornchurch for two weeks and carried on with its duties. In early November it returned to the operational control of No. 12 Group for a rest period, based at Drem in Scotland. It carried out patrols of Edinburgh and the Firth of Forth but these were uneventful. During the time at Drem, its pilots were also involved in the testing of new pressurised flying suits. One was killed when his Spitfire had to ditch in the Firth of Forth; it was believed that the bulky suit hindered his efforts to bail out.

== Service with 2nd Tactical Air Force ==
=== 1944 ===
No. 485 Squadron remained at Drem until February 1944, at which time it shifted back to Hornchurch. It was now a part of No. 135 Wing, along with Nos. 122 and 222 Squadrons. The wing was assigned to the 2nd Tactical Air Force's No. 84 Group. The 2nd TAF had been raised to provide air cover protection and support during the operations of the Second British Army and the First Canadian Army during the impending invasion of France. Accordingly, it began training in the appropriate tactics, including operating in a fighter-bomber role. The squadron returned to operations in March, carrying out bomber escorts and sweeps to France.

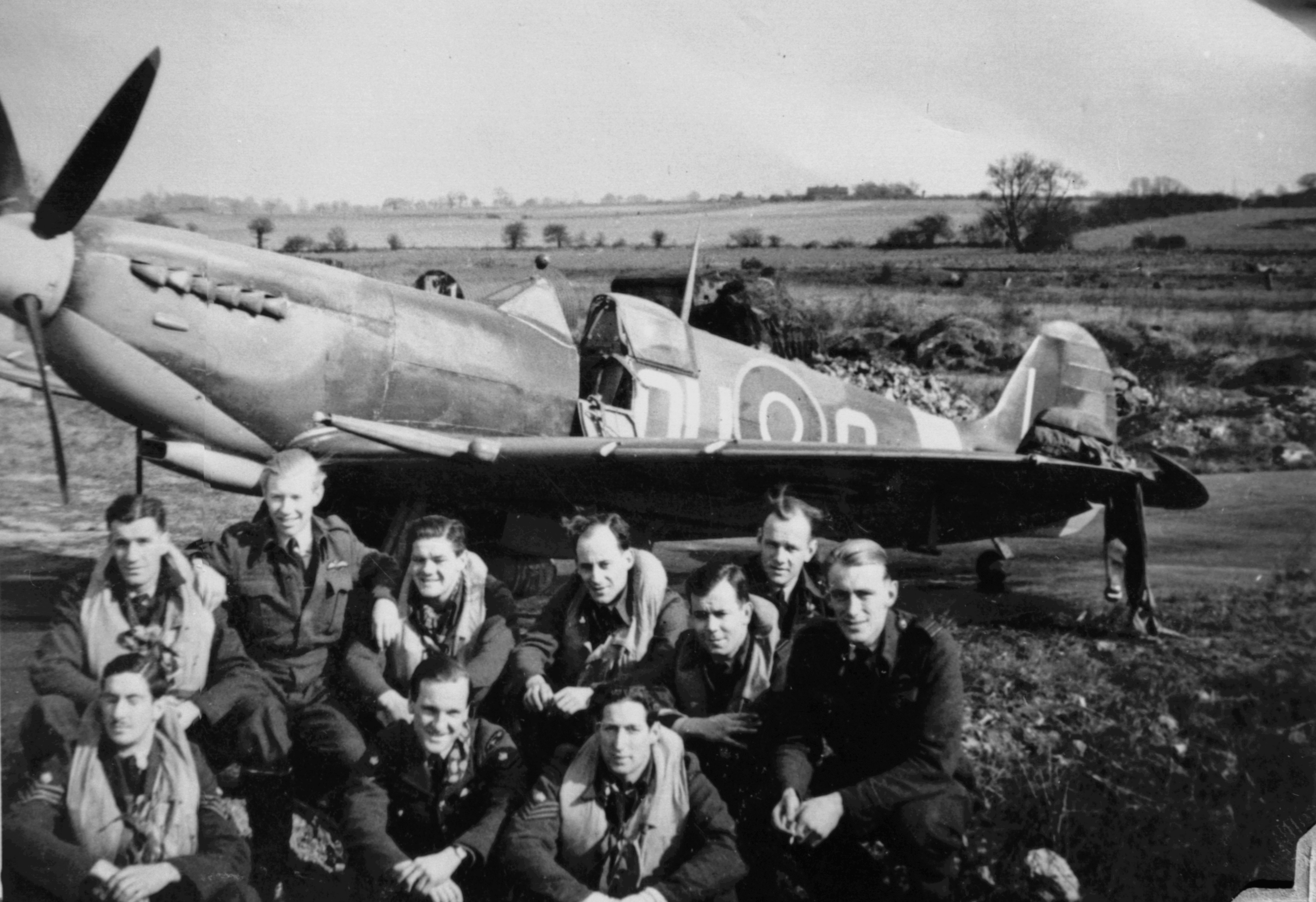
A group of No. 485 Squadron pilots at Selsey, on D-Day, 6 June 1944

The following month, now operating from Selsey, it started fighter-bomber operations, attacking the launching sites for the V-1 flying bombs that were being targeted against England. In the run up to the Normandy landings, the German coastal radar facilities on the French coast were also attacked. Despite flying 400 missions from April until just prior to D-Day, there were few encounters with the Luftwaffe. However, opportunities for air-to-air combat came on D-Day, 6 June, on which it flew four patrols covering the landings on Gold, Juno and Sword beaches. On one of these, Flying Officer John Houlton destroyed a Ju 88 that was alleged to be the first enemy aircraft shot down on D-Day. However, it is likely that RAF de Havilland Mosquitos had destroyed some enemy aircraft earlier in the day, before dawn. As well as sharing in the destruction of another Ju 88 that day, Houlton went on to shoot down two Bf 109s in the following days. A few days after D-Day, a friendly fire incident occurred. While on patrol just off the landing beaches, a section was attacked by a Seafire. Despite the New Zealanders' attempts to identify themselves, the Seafire persisted in its attack and in response was shot down into the sea. Its pilot, of the Fleet Air Arm and on his first operational mission, was killed.

By the middle of June, the squadron, although still based in the south of England, was regularly landing at airstrips in the Normandy beachhead to refuel. It continued on patrolling duty for the remainder of the month, carrying out 49 patrols altogether. During this time, the squadron's pilots shot down a total of nine German aircraft with no losses by 30 June; these were to be the last enemy aircraft shot down. They also continued to seek out the V1 flying bomb launching sites, either to attack them directly with 500 pounds (230 kg) bombs or as escorts to heavy bombers.

From late August, the squadron were flying from a base in Caen-Carpiquet, supporting the Canadians as they advanced along the north coast of France dealing with the ports that remained in the hands of the Germans. They regularly harassed transportation, including ambulances which were used by the Germans to transport munitions. These were often observed to explode particularly violently. John Pattison took over as commander of the unit in September; his predecessor, Squadron Leader John Niven, had led the squadron since February and during his period in command, no pilots had been killed while on operations. By this time, the squadron was operating from Merville in its efforts to provide close support to the First Canadian Army. As a brief respite from these duties, it was briefly recalled to England in early November for training in air gunnery. During this period one of its pilots was killed when he crashed into the sea conducting low-level manoeuvres. Back in the Low Countries a couple of weeks later, the squadron recommenced working with the Canadians, now at the Scheldt Estuary. At the end of the month, two of its pilots attacked midget submarines in the estuary, and claimed two as destroyed.

=== 1945 ===
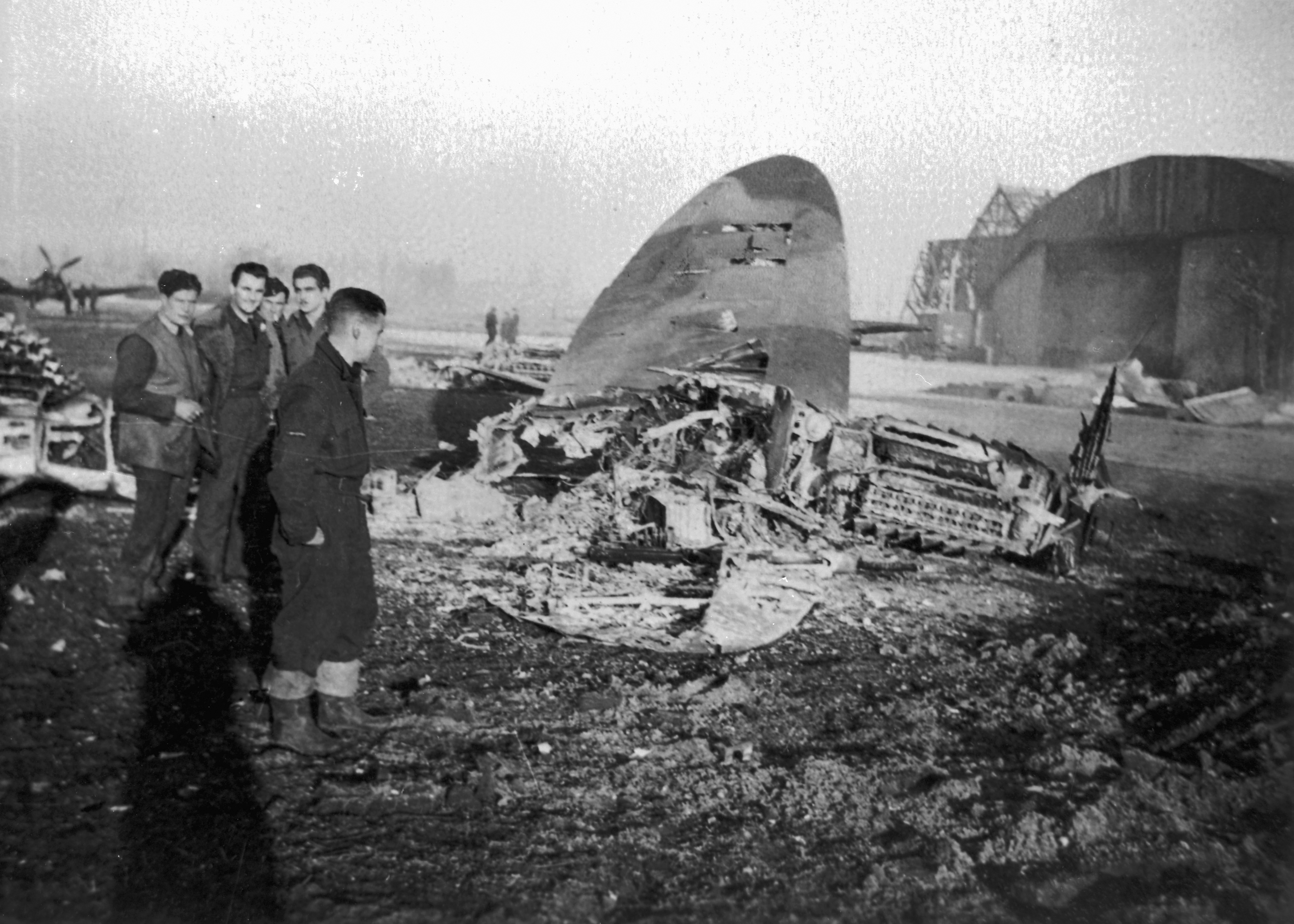
Members of the ground crew examining a burned out No. 485 Squadron Spitfire after it was destroyed by the Luftwaffe when it attacked Maldegem, in Belgium, on 1 January 1945

On 1 January 1945 No. 485 Squadron, based at Maldegem in Belgium at the time, lost eleven Spitfires on the ground when attacked by Bf 109s during Operation Bodenplatte. There were no pilot or ground crew casualties and new Spitfires were quickly made available the next day. A few days later, it suffered its first operational casualties in over 12 months, when two pilots were killed strafing a train. In February, the squadron returned to the United Kingdom and were based at RAF Predannack in Cornwall where Typhoons were flown in preparation for a planned conversion to the similar Hawker Tempest. However, the change in aircraft never happened due to a lack of availability of Tempests, and the squadron went back to Europe after two months and reequipped with Spitfire Mk XVIs at Twente, in Holland.

Now one of the squadrons of No. 132 Wing, it flew mainly reconnaissance missions and also targeted transportation infrastructure. The squadron rarely encountered the Luftwaffe. Its final fatality was on 8 February, when a pilot crashed into a building while making a low level attack on a train. In April, near Bremen, several pilots attempted to attack a Messerschmitt Me 262 jet fighter that they spotted beneath them while escorting some bombers. It was easily able to evade them despite the Spitfires having the advantage of height. No. 485 Squadron ended the war based at Fassberg, an airfield in Germany. Its last mission, a patrol over Oldenburg, was carried out on 7 May. It was officially disbanded on 26 August 1945, with many of its personnel having already returned to England and then onto New Zealand. Some opted to join the RAF or RNZAF in peacetime service.

During the course of the Second World War, No. 485 Squadron flew 10,717 sorties and, according to the Official History of New Zealand in the Second World War 1939–45, claimed 63 enemy aircraft destroyed with another 25 probably destroyed. However, aviation historians Paul Sortehaug and Phil Listemann credit the squadron with 72 confirmed enemy aircraft destroyed and 25 probably destroyed. A total of 39 pilots were killed while serving with the squadron, including nine of the original complement. Following its switch to a fighter-bomber role, pilots destroyed 70 motor vehicles and five railway engines. While serving with the squadron, two of its personnel were awarded the Distinguished Service Order and 17 were awarded the Distinguished Flying Cross (DFC), with five being awarded a bar to their DFC. One airman received the Distinguished Flying Medal.

== Commanding officers ==
The following served as commanding officers of No. 485 Squadron:

- Squadron Leader M. W. B. Knight (April – November 1941);
- Squadron Leader E. P. Wells (November 1941 – May 1942);
- Squadron Leader R. J. Grant (May 1942 – March 1943);
- Squadron Leader R. W. Baker (March – June 1943);
- Squadron Leader J. M. Checketts (July – September 1943);
- Squadron Leader M. R. D. Hume (September 1943 – February 1944);
- Squadron Leader J. B. Niven (February – November 1944);
- Squadron Leader J. G. Pattison (November 1944 – February 1945);
- Squadron Leader J. J. Macdonald (February – July 1945);
- Squadron Leader S. F. Browne (July – August 1945).

== Legacy ==
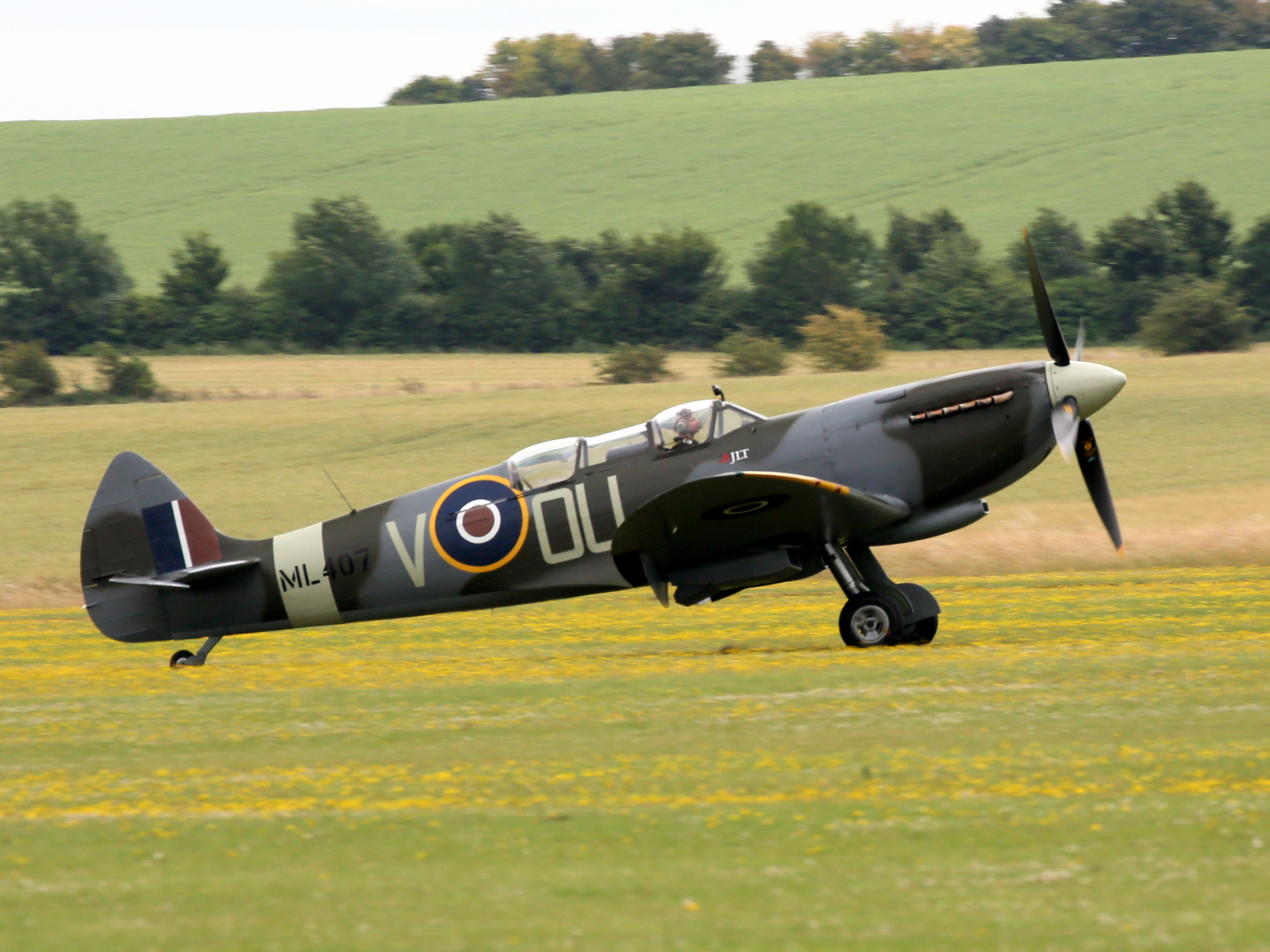
The 'Grace Spitfire', a restored Spitfire MkIXc in the colours and markings of No. 485 Squadron pilot John Houlton, as it appeared on D-Day at Duxford in 2016

The Spitfire Mk IXc in which John Houlton shot down a Ju 88 on D-Day is now an airworthy display aircraft. After the war it was converted to a two-seat trainer for the Irish Air Corps and then acquired and restored to flying condition by Nick Grace. It was flown by Grace's widow Carolyn and her son Richard in numerous airshows and aerial displays. A Spitfire Mk XVIe, in the colours of No. 485 (NZ) Squadron and depicting aircraft OU-V as it appeared in 1945, is displayed at the Air Force Museum of New Zealand at Wigram.

The squadron's motto, in Māori, is Ka Whawhai Tonu meaning "We Will Fight On". Its badge was adopted in 1967 as the official badge for the RNZAF Strike Wing, based at Ohakea.

No. 485 Wing RNZAF was formed on 1 July 2002 to command the units stationed at RNZAF Base Auckland. The wing was disbanded on 2 March 2015 as part of a reorganisation of the RNZAF.

Owen Hunter, the last surviving pilot to have flown with No. 485 Squadron died on 27 February 2026, at the age of 101.
