= Edward Wells (RNZAF officer) =

New Zealand flying ace (1916–2005)

Edward Preston Wells
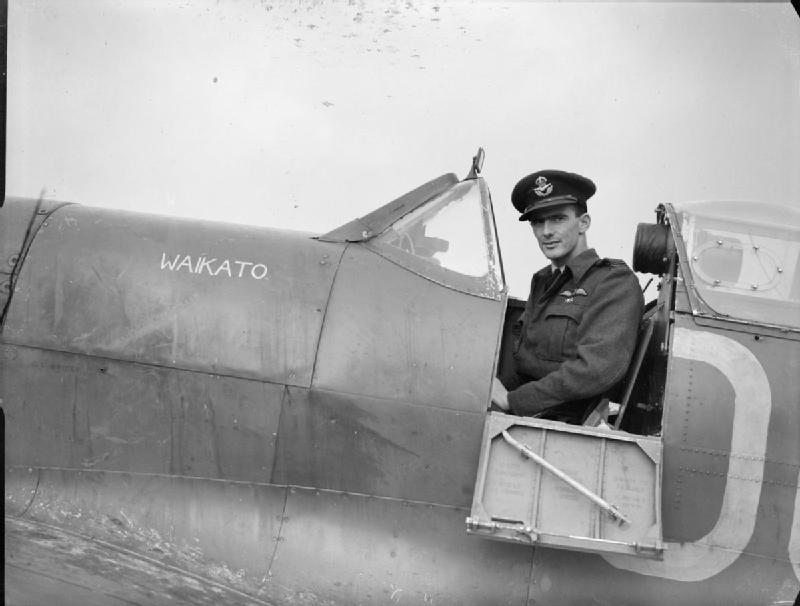
- Wells, sitting in the cockpit of a Spitfire Mk. Vb named for one of the provinces of New Zealand
- Born: 26 July 1916; Cambridge, New Zealand
- Died: 4 November 2005 (aged 89); England
- Military career
- Allegiance: New Zealand
- Branch: Royal New Zealand Air Force (1939–1947); Royal Air Force (1947–1960)
- Rank: Group Captain
- Nickname: Hawkeye
- Commands: RAF Bawdsey; Day Fighter Leaders' School; West Malling Wing; Detling Wing; Tangmere Wing; Kenley Wing; No. 485 (NZ) Squadron
- Conflicts: Second World War; Battle of Britain; Circus offensive
- Awards: Distinguished Service Order; Distinguished Flying Cross & Bar

Group Captain Edward Preston Wells DSO, DFC & Bar (26 July 1916 – 4 November 2005) was a New Zealand flying ace of the Royal New Zealand Air Force (RNZAF) during the Second World War. He was credited with the destruction of twelve enemy aircraft.

Born in Cambridge, New Zealand, Wells joined the RNZAF in 1939. After completing flight training he was sent to the United Kingdom to serve with the Royal Air Force (RAF). He flew Supermarine Spitfires with No. 41 Squadron during the later stages of the Battle of Britain and later flew with No. 485 (NZ) Squadron, becoming its commander in November 1941. For much of 1943 to 1944, he commanded fighter wings over England and France. By the end of the war he was commander of the Day Fighter Leaders' School. He transferred to the RAF in 1947, holding a series of senior posts until his retirement in 1960 at which time he took up farming. In his later years, he moved to Spain and took up fruit growing and research. He died in 2005 at the age of 89.

== Early life ==
Edward Preston Wells was born in Cambridge in New Zealand on 26 July 1916, the son of Mervyn Wells, a farmer, and his wife. He was educated at Cambridge High School and after completing his education, took up farming. In early 1938, he changed vocations, moving to Auckland to work as a car salesman. Later in the year he began managing a Studebaker car yard in Hamilton. He was a noted marksman, winning the Auckland provincial championship in clay-bird shooting and earning the nickname 'Hawkeye'.

In October 1938, Wells applied for a short service commission in the Royal New Zealand Air Force (RNZAF). His application was accepted in April 1939 and six months later he reported for his initial training. He went onto to No. 2 Elementary Flight Training School in New Plymouth the following month and No. 2 Flight Training School at Woodbourne in January 1940. He gained his wings on 23 April.

== Second World War ==
The Second World War was well underway at the time of Wells' completion of flying training and, now a pilot officer, he was posted to England to join the Royal Air Force (RAF). Along with 22 other RNZAF pilots, including Robert Spurdle who, like Wells, would go on to lead a fighter squadron in the war, he sailed from New Zealand aboard the RMS Rangitata in June 1940. On his arrival was sent to No. 7 Operational Training Unit at Hawarden to convert to Supermarine Spitfires. His first operational posting was to No. 266 Squadron, based at Wittering in late August.

=== Battle of Britain ===
At the time Wells joined No. 266 Squadron, it had just been withdrawn from Hornchurch and was in the process of switching to the latest model Spitfire. It also flew patrols over London and Duxford. Wells was only with No. 266 Squadron for a month before being posted to No. 41 Squadron on 2 October, flying out of Hornchurch. As part of No. 11 Group, this was a much more active posting and the squadron was repeatedly scrambled to meet incoming German raids. On his second day with the squadron, his Spitfire was badly damaged in an encounter with Messerschmitt Bf 109s. In an engagement on 7 October, he had a share in a Dornier Do 215, along with several other pilots. During the later stages of the Battle of Britain, he shot down a Bf 109 near Boulogne on 17 October and another as a probable on 29 October. A further Bf 109 was confirmed as destroyed on 2 November.

On 11 November, while on convoy patrol over the English Channel, Wells encountered aircraft of the Corpo Aereo Italiano, a formation of the Regia Aeronautica (the Italian Royal Air Force) that participated in the Battle of Britain. Some Fiat CR.42s dove on his Spitfire but he was able to evade them and made his own attack, claiming one as damaged. He was the first fighter pilot based in Britain to engage the Italians. The same day he damaged a Henschel Hs 126. At the end of the month, flying as wingman to Flying Officer John MacKenzie, he shot down a Bf 109 near Dymchurch. It was one of 10 shot down by pilots of No. 41 Squadron that day. On 22 January 1941, he damaged a Heinkel He 111.

=== Circus offensive ===
In early March 1941, Wells was posted to No. 485 (NZ) Squadron, based at Driffield, in Yorkshire. This was a newly formed unit, with its flying personnel being New Zealanders. Wells was one of its more experienced pilots, having by this time accounted for a confirmed three enemy aircraft destroyed. After an initial training period, the squadron became operational from mid-April, flying convoy patrols and the occasional interception mission targeting nighttime raids carried out by German bombers. The next month Wells was promoted to flying officer. Then in late June, the squadron began carrying out offensive sweeps over northern France as part of the RAF's Circus offensive. By this time it was operating from Redhill with the Kenley Wing, which also included Nos. 452 and 602 squadrons.

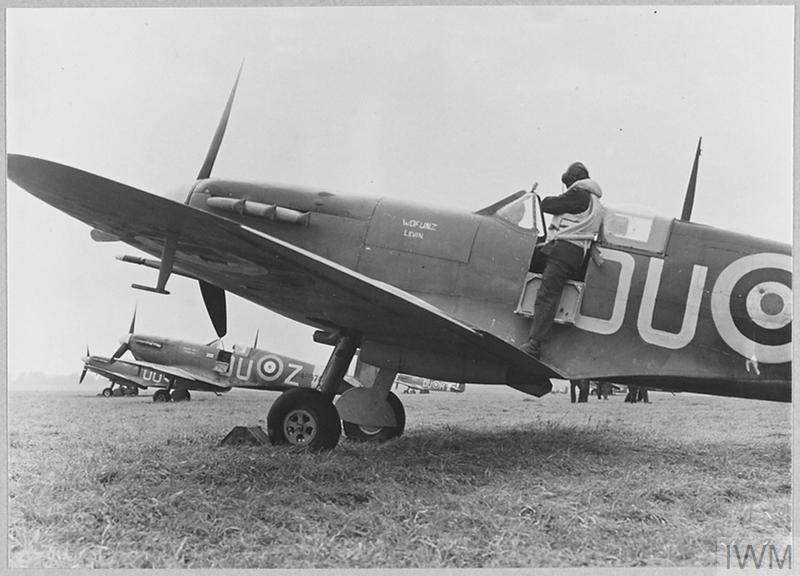
A line up of Spitfires of No. 485 Squadron at Redhill airfield

While escorting Short Stirling bombers on a raid targeting a steelworks facility in Lille on 5 July, Wells destroyed a Bf 109, the first enemy fighter shot down over France by a pilot of No. 485 Squadron. The German was seen to bail out. Then, on the return flight to England, he encountered another Bf 109 and this too was destroyed. Later in the month, while on another escort mission, this time to Cherbourg, he shot down a Bf 109. By this stage of the war, Wells had been promoted to acting flight lieutenant and was one of No. 485 Squadron's flight leaders. A Bf 109 was claimed as damaged on 16 August and then, three days later, while No. 485 Squadron was escorting Bristol Blenheim light bombers on a raid to Lille, it became involved in a wide-ranging melee from Dunkirk to Calais after being surprised by several Bf 109s. Wells shot down one Bf 109 that was targeting another Spitfire of the squadron and damaged a second German fighter.

At times there was tension between the New Zealanders of No. 485 Squadron and the reportedly more successful Australian No. 452 Squadron that was also part of the Kenley Wing. There were suspicions that the Australians were overstating their claims of aerial victories and Wells was spurred so far as to complain to the station commander, Wing Commander Prickman. His complaint was dismissed as sour grapes. At the end of the month, Wells, the most successful fighter pilot in the squadron with six aerial victories at the time, was awarded the Distinguished Flying Cross (DFC). The citation, published in The London Gazette read:

This officer has served with fighter squadrons since May, 1940, and has taken part in many engagements against the enemy. He has destroyed at least five of their aircraft and has damaged others. He has at all times shown the greatest courage and determination.

— London Gazette, No. 35260, 29 August 1941

Wells damaged a Bf 109 on 17 September, and the next day, while on another escort mission, the squadron was again attacked by several Bf 109s. Wells shot down one of the eight Bf 109s claimed by the squadron's pilots in the encounter. A few days later, the squadron was again engaged in a dogfight when he came to the aid of his wingman whose aircraft had been damaged. Wells destroyed a Bf 109 about to attack the struggling Spitfire. On his return flight to England, he was repeatedly attacked by a flight of four Bf 109s. During this engagement, he shot down one Bf 109 whose pilot had a made a mistake and exposed his aircraft to Well's guns. He was able to evade the remaining pursuers over the English Channel. A Bf 109 was claimed as a probable on 2 October, when he attacked it during a squadron patrol covering Dunkirk to Ostend. By early November, Wells was still the leading flying ace in No. 485 Squadron and had completed 46 missions to German-occupied France. He was awarded a Bar to the DFC he had received a few months earlier. The published citation read:

This officer has completed 46 operational sorties over enemy territory He is a splendid leader and a most determined and skilful fighter pilot whose keenness in action sets a splendid example Flight Lieutenant Wells has definitely destroyed 13, probably destroyed 5 and damaged a further 8 hostile aircraft.

— London Gazette, No. 35341, 7 November 1941

Wells took command of No. 485 Squadron at the end of November, having been promoted to acting squadron leader. No. 485 Squadron was now based at Kenley and on 12 February 1942, it flew a mission to target the fighter screen put up by the Luftwaffe to cover the Channel Dash by the German battleships Scharnhorst and Gneisenau. The squadron was split into three flights, with Wells leading one. The other two flights were dispatched to deal with German fighters spotted between the ships and the Belgian coast while Wells' flight flew the seaward side of the battleships. Not meeting any enemy fighters, with his flight he attacked one of the E-boats screening the battleships.

In the squadron's operations over France, it was now beginning to meet the new Focke-Wulf Fw 190 fighter. Wells destroyed one on 16 April, followed by another on 24 April. A further Fw 190 was damaged the next day. The following month, he was promoted to acting wing commander and given command of the Kenley Wing. While flying with the wing on 24 May, he damaged a Bf 109 and he destroyed a Fw 190 the next month. In August 1942, Wells' award of the Distinguished Service Order (DSO) was announced. The published citation read:

This officer has completed many operational sorties. He has destroyed 11, probably destroyed 3 and damaged many more hostile aircraft. His courage, skill and initiative have proved a source of inspiration to his colleagues and his fine leadership has contributed materially to the many successes achieved by the wing.

— London Gazette, No. 35658, 7 August 1942

=== Later war service ===
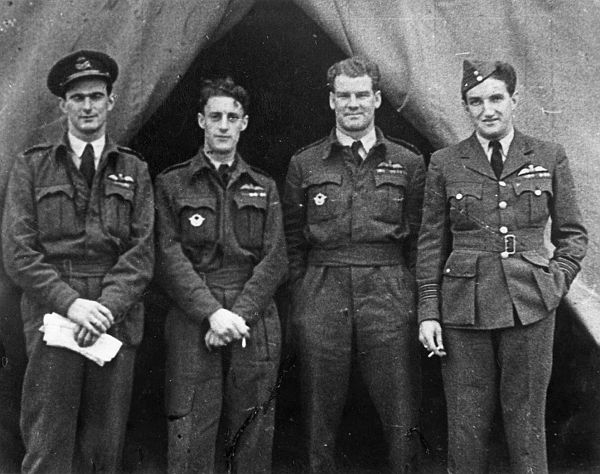
Wells stands first left in this group of New Zealand wing commanders, sometime in 1944. The others, from left to right, are Colin Gray, Alan Deere, and Bill Crawford-Compton

By the time of his award of the DSO, Wells had been stood down from operational duty. He had flown on continuous active service for two years, including 133 missions to France. He was sent back to New Zealand on leave in September 1943. While there, he was asked to take on a role with the New Zealand military authorities. He declined, preferring to serve in Europe. After six months, he returned to England by way of the United States, where he visited aircraft factories. By April 1943, Wells was back in England. After attending a course at RAF Staff College, he resumed command of Kenley Wing. In mid-August, he married a Dutchwoman, Mary Dorothea née de Booy, in London. Three years earlier, she and her sister and parents had escaped to England from the Nazi-occupied Netherlands in a fishing boat.

In November 1943, Wells was posted to the headquarters of No. 11 Group as Wing Commander, Training. He remained in this role until March 1944, when he was assigned to the Tactical Air Force, flying in command of Tangmere Wing. Within days of his arrival, he destroyed a Messerschmitt Me 410 which he had caught on the ground. He then assumed command of the Detling Wing, composed of three Spitfire squadrons recently transferred from Sicily. A period in command of the West Malling Wing followed. In November 1944 he was appointed commander of the Day Fighter Leaders' School at the Central Fighter Establishment at Wittering. He remained in this role for the remainder of the Second World War.

Wells ended the war having official credit for 13 destroyed enemy aircraft, three probably destroyed and 15 damaged. However, more recent scholarship has revised Wells' tally; the aviation historians Christopher Shores and Clive Williams suggest Wells' score was 12 destroyed, four probables and six damaged with a half share in another damaged enemy aircraft, plus a Me 410 destroyed on the ground. Mike Spick credits Wells with a similar tally: 12 destroyed, four probables and seven damaged.

== Postwar career ==
In the immediate postwar period, Wells remained in command of the Day Fighter Leaders' School. Then, in 1947, Wells resigned from the RNZAF in order to transfer to the RAF, having been granted a permanent commission. He held a series of postings with RAF Fighter Command, and by 1954 was commander of RAF Bawdsey, an air defence radar station in Suffolk. He later served on the Joint Planning Staff at the Ministry of Defence before retiring with the rank of group captain in June 1960.

== Later life ==
In his retirement, Wells began farming near Woodbridge, in Suffolk but in his later years moved with his wife to Spain. The couple had an orchard and subsequently Wells developed a keen interest in fruits and the diseases that affected them. He died in England on 4 November 2005, survived by two children. His wife had predeceased him by four years.
