= Robert Spurdle =

New Zealand flying ace (1918–1994)

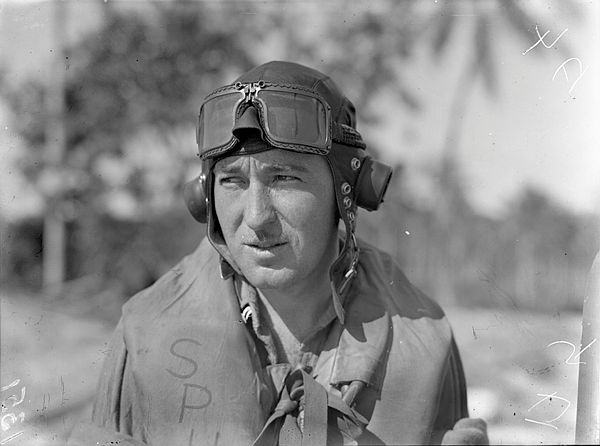
- Robert Spurdle, as a flight lieutenant in 1943 with No. 16 Squadron in Espiritu Santo
- Born: 3 March 1918; Wanganui, New Zealand
- Died: 5 March 1994 (aged 76); Whitianga, New Zealand
- Military career
- Allegiance: New Zealand
- Branch: Royal New Zealand Air Force (1939–1940; 1945–1946); Royal Air Force (1940–1945)
- Rank: Wing Commander
- Nicknames: Peter, Spud
- Commands: No. 80 Squadron
- Conflicts: Second World War; Battle of Britain; Channel Front; Solomon Islands campaign; Operation Varsity
- Awards: Distinguished Flying Cross & Bar; Mention in despatches

Robert Lawrence "Peter" Spurdle DFC & Bar (3 March 1918 – 5 March 1994) was a New Zealand flying ace of the Royal Air Force (RAF) during the Second World War. He was credited with the destruction of ten enemy aircraft.

Born in Wanganui, New Zealand, Spurdle joined the Royal New Zealand Air Force (RNZAF) in 1939. After completing flight training in 1940 he was sent to the United Kingdom and transferred to the RAF. He flew Supermarine Spitfires with No. 74 Squadron during the later stages of the Battle of Britain and later flew with No. 91 Squadron. From late 1942 and into the following year, he was temporarily attached to the RNZAF, firstly in a training capacity in New Zealand, and then in the Solomon Islands campaign with No. 16 Squadron. He returned to Europe in 1944, flying with No. 80 Squadron as its commander. After the end of the war in Europe, Spurdle returned to service with the RNZAF and was discharged in 1946. In civilian life he worked as an engineer before taking up yachting. He died in 1994 at the age of 76.

== Early life ==
Robert Lawrence Spurdle, known to his family as Peter, was born in Wanganui on 3 March 1918. He was a son of F. M. Spurdle and his wife. Educated at Wanganui Collegiate School, he worked as a warehouseman after completing his schooling. He decided to pursue a career in military aviation and in early 1939, applied for a short-service commission in the Royal New Zealand Air Force (RNZAF). He was accepted and commenced his training in September.

== Second World War ==
By the time Spurdle's training started, the Second World War had been underway for some weeks and his short service course was the last to be run by the RNZAF. He went to No. 1 Elementary Flying Training School at the RNZAF station at Taieri and then No. 1 Flight Training School at Wigram Air Base in Christchurch. Sickness affected the progress of his training which, at this stage, was as a light bomber pilot. Instead of graduating with his group of trainees, he was held back and completed his course with another intake.

Along with 22 other RNZAF pilots, among them Edward Wells, who like Spurdle, would go on to lead a fighter squadron in the war, he travelled to the United Kingdom in early June 1940 to serve with the Royal Air Force (RAF). Officially transferred to the RAF in July, he went to Uxbridge and then onto No. 7 Operational Training Unit at Hawarden, where he learnt to fly the Supermarine Spitfire.

=== Battle of Britain ===
On 21 August, Spurdle was posted to No. 74 Squadron, which was commanded by Squadron Leader Sailor Malan. At the time he joined the squadron, it was at Kirton-in-Lindsey, reequipping with the Mk IIa Spitfire. Spurdle began operational flying on 28 August and two weeks later, was one of three pilots that damaged a Heinkel He 111 medium bomber. In mid-October, the squadron joined No. 11 Group, based at the RAF's station at Biggin Hill. Soon afterwards, he was involved in a dogfight which saw him having to bail out when his Spitfire broke up while in a high speed dive in pursuit of a Messerschmitt Bf 109. At the end of the month he claimed a Bf 109 as probably destroyed. A few days later, he had his first confirmed enemy aircraft destroyed, when No. 74 Squadron, patrolling with No. 92 Squadron, encountered a group of 60 Bf 109s over Maidstone. He engaged and shot down a Bf 109, which crashed near Ashford in Kent. He had just been promoted to flying officer.

Another significant encounter was on 14 November, when No. 74 Squadron intercepted a force of 50 Junkers Ju 87 dive bombers over Dover, accompanied by 25 Bf 109s. A total of 15 German aircraft was confirmed as destroyed with two probables and many others damaged. Spurdle claimed one of the probables, a Ju 87, and two others damaged. He then shot down a Bf 109 on 5 December.

=== Channel Front ===
In early 1941, there was change in tactics and Fighter Command began carry out offensive sweeps over the English Channel and the coast of occupied France to draw the Luftwaffe into combat. On 3 March, while on such a sweep with No. 74 Squadron, Spurdle shot down two Bf 109s. Later in the month, he shared in the probable destruction of a Junkers Ju 88 bomber and damaged another bomber, a Dornier Do 217. On his last operational flight with the squadron, carried out on 6 April, his Spitfire received damage when he was attacked by German fighters while strafing an airfield in Belgium. Despite this, on his return flight back to RAF Manston, from where the squadron was operating at the time, he spotted a Messerschmitt Bf 110 heavy fighter and was able to shoot it down. Later in the month he was posted to No. 92 Squadron. Operating from Hawkinge in Kent, the squadron patrolled the Kentish coast and made reconnaissance flights over the North Sea. In May he claimed a Bf 109 as a probable and damaged another later in the month.

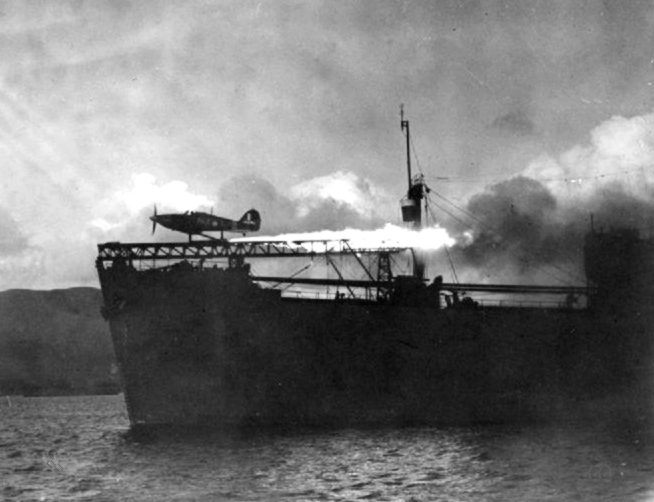
A Hawker Hurricane being launched from a CAM ship, 1941

By June, Spurdle was on new duties, having been transferred to the Merchant Ship Fighter Unit, based at Speke. The unit operated Hawker Hurricanes, which were launched from catapults mounted on merchant vessels; these were known as CAM ships. They provided some protection against long-range Focke-Wulf Fw 200 bombers that operated against shipping convoys crossing the Atlantic. In the early stages of his posting at Speke, he crashed a de Havilland Tiger Moth while stunting the aircraft. He was court-martialed for his misdemeanor. He made two voyages to the United States aboard CAM ships but these were without incident due to a lack of enemy activity. By February of the following year, he was back with No. 92 Squadron. Two months later he was appointed a flight commander and received a promotion to acting flight lieutenant.

On 25 July, Spurdle destroyed a Bf 109 and the following day, flying over Hastings, had a successful engagement with a Focke-Wulf Fw 190, one of a flight of four. The German pilot bailed out and was recovered by a British Air Sea Rescue launch. Spurdle visited the pilot, who had been hospitalised, and found that he was Horst Bennokruger, a flying ace of the Luftwaffe who had shot down a reported 17 British aircraft. Just two days later, Spurdle had an encounter with another Fw 190, claiming it as damaged. Early in August, a Bf 109 was damaged. Later in the month he was awarded the Distinguished Flying Cross (DFC). The published citation read:

This officer is a keen and determined pilot He has destroyed 5, probably destroyed 4 and damaged several more enemy aircraft. His devotion to duty has set a praiseworthy example.

— London Gazette, No. 35667, 14 August 1942.

Shortly after his award of the DFC was announced, he took part in the Dieppe Raid. During the operation, No. 92 Squadron was tasked with targeting German vessels that could disrupt the landings being made by the Canadian forces. Spurdle flew four patrols during the day. By the end of the month, he was very fatigued and was shifted to No. 116 Squadron, which was involved in less strenuous work: radar and anti-aircraft cooperation duties. He was then loaned to the RNZAF, returning to New Zealand in December 1942.

=== Solomon Islands ===
Spurdle was tasked with establishing a Camera Gun Assessing School, based at the RNZAF's base at Ohakea, a duty that he performed from January to May 1943. He was then posted as a flight commander in the RNZAF's No. 16 Squadron. At the time, it was operating Curtiss P-40 Kittyhawks and based at Woodbourne, preparing for service in the Solomon Islands campaign.

By the end of June, it was operating from Espiritu Santo, carrying out anti-submarine patrols and intercepting Japanese aircraft. The following month, it shifted to Guadalcanal where its main role was to be acting as escort to American bombers. Although the Japanese fighter aircraft were carrying fewer offensive operations by this time, Spurdle shot down a Hap, a variant of the Mitsubishi A6M Zero, on 13 August. A Zeke fighter, another Zero variant, was destroyed nearly two weeks later. During its time at Guadalcanal, the squadron also searched for Japanese barges transporting supplies to isolated garrisons in the Solomons. On one such mission, Spurdle and his wingman damaged a barge at Choiseul Island and also destroyed three Japanese patrol boats. In mid-September, the squadron ceased operations on Guadalcanal and returned to New Zealand.

=== Return to Europe ===
After a period of rest, Spurdle ended his attachment to the RNZAF and returned to England aboard the steamer Umgeni. He was posted to No. 130 Squadron in April; it operated from Lympe and flew Spitfire Vbs in bomber escort missions. His time with the squadron was brief for the following month, he was sent to No. 80 Squadron, based at Hornchurch. It was flying offensive operations to the continent, in preparation for the invasion of Normandy. A flight commander by the end of May, on D-Day, the squadron was originally held in reserve. Towards the end of the day, it escorted Short Stirlings that were towing gliders and during this mission, Spurdle and his flight attacked a German tank.

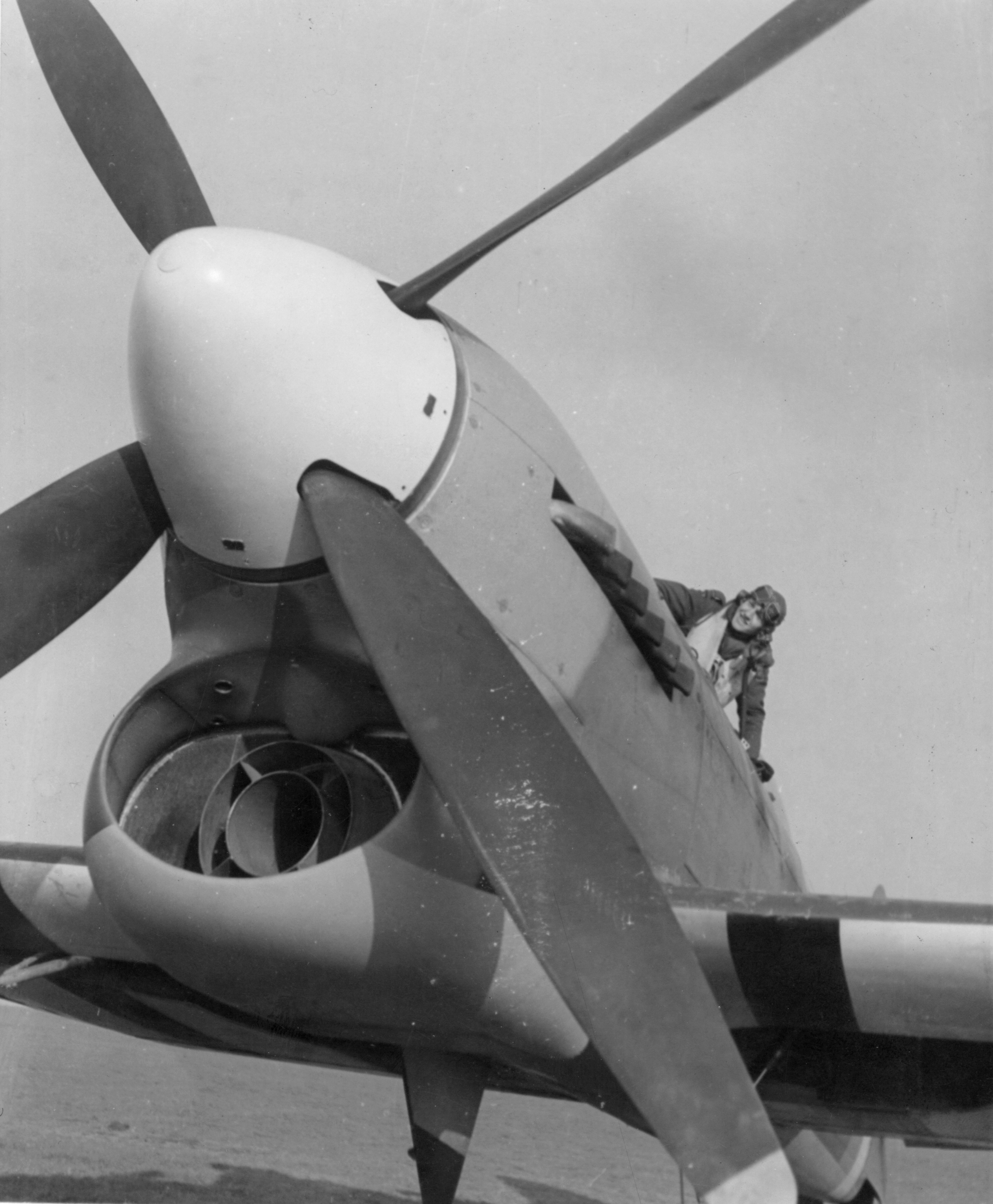
Spurdle and his Hawker Tempest

He was given command of the squadron two months later. Now an acting squadron leader, he oversaw his command's conversion from Spitfire IXs to the Hawker Tempest. He led the squadron during its support of the parachute landings at Arnhem, targeting the German flak guns.

Afterwards, and now flying from Holland, No. 80 Squadron joined No. 122 Wing. Originally tasked with defensive work, protecting bridges and airfields from attacks by the Luftwaffe, in December the squadron switched to offensive operations. Soon afterwards, he was credited with damaging two Junkers Ju 188 bombers. He was stood down from operations in early January 1945, on account of being fatigued from his extensive war service, and was sent to serve at the headquarters of No. 83 Group. Later that month, his award of a bar to his DFC was announced. He was invested with the DFC in a ceremony at Buckingham Palace later in the year.

Tiring of his headquarters role, Spurdle volunteered for duty as an air-support controller. Having received training in radio duties, Spurdle participated in Operation Varsity, the second airborne crossing of the Rhine. Attached to the British 6th Airborne Division, he was commander of three RAF radio teams. Landed by glider at Wesel on 24 March, his teams were tasked with handling of air-support for the ground forces involved in the action. For his work on this occasion, he was mentioned in despatches. He was later attached to the 11th Armoured Division, working in a similar role co-ordinating fighter activities in support of the British forces as they advanced to the Elbe, where he finished the war in May 1945.

Spurdle, now a wing commander, flew 565 operational sorties, including his glider flight with the 6th Airborne Division, during the course of the war, and was credited with destroying ten enemy aircraft, two, and a half share in another, probably destroyed and nine damaged. The aviation historian Mike Spick gives similar totals for Spurdle, although credits him with eleven damaged rather than nine.

== Later life ==
In July 1945, Spurdle was sent to the Central Gunnery School at Catfoss. He was to take an instructor's course there but a few days after his arrival, his service with the RAF ended and he was transferred to the RNZAF. This required him to give up his commission in the RAF. He was repatriated to New Zealand in November, sailing aboard the RMS Rangitata. He was transferred to the reserve in April 1946, after a period of leave.

Returning to civilian life, Spurdle established an engineering business in Wanganui. He became interested in maritime pursuits, taking up diving and going on a sailing cruise for four months around the South Pacific. Following this, he constructed a catamaran, the Whai, an endeavour which took four years. Once completed, he sailed the Whai to Japan. His account of the construction of the catamaran and its subsequent voyage to Japan was published as Into the Rising Sun in 1972. Moving to Whitianga, he completed a second catamaran in 1978. He later wrote his memoirs, The Blue Arena, published in 1986. He died on 5 March 1994 at Whitianga and his remains were interred at Mercury Bay cemetery. With his wife, Shirley, he had three children.
