= Stanley Browne (RNZAF officer) =

New Zealander flying ace (1919–2011)

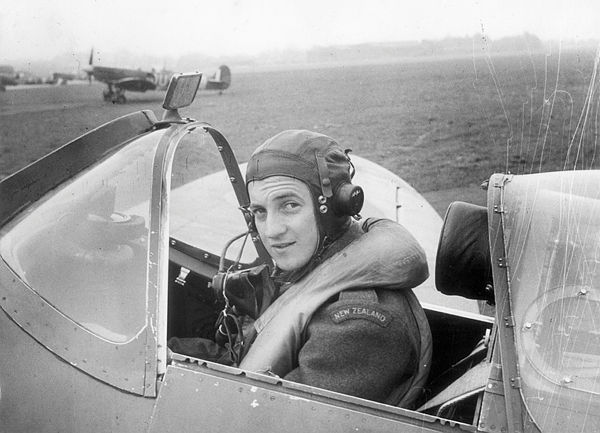
- Browne, sitting in his Supermarine Spitfire fighter at Kenley
- Born: 29 October 1919; Wellington, New Zealand
- Died: 15 January 2011 (aged 91); Tauranga, New Zealand
- Military career
- Allegiance: New Zealand
- Branch: Royal New Zealand Air Force
- Service years: 1941–1945
- Rank: Squadron leader
- Commands: No. 485 Squadron
- Conflicts: Second World War; Channel Front; Tunisian campaign; Allied invasion of Sicily; Western Allied invasion of Germany
- Awards: Distinguished Flying Cross and Bar

Stanley Franklin Browne, DFC & Bar (29 October 1919 – 15 January 2011) was a New Zealand flying ace of the Royal New Zealand Air Force (RNZAF) during the Second World War. He was officially credited with at least five aerial victories.

Born in Wellington, Browne was a university student when he joined the RNZAF in March 1941. Once his flight training in New Zealand was completed, he proceeded to the United Kingdom to serve with the Royal Air Force. He was posted to No. 485 Squadron in early 1942 but was shot down later in the year over German-occupied France. With the help of the French Resistance he avoided the Germans and made his way to the south of France. He was caught when crossing the border into Vichy France and was interned for several weeks. He escaped captivity and eventually got back to the United Kingdom. He was transferred to the Middle East where he ferried aircraft before being posted to No. 93 Squadron. He flew Supermarine Spitfires in the Tunisian campaign and in the Allied invasion of Sicily, shooting down a number of German aircraft before being rested in December 1943. After a spell on instructing duties he returned to operational flying with No. 485 Squadron during the final stages of the war in Europe. He briefly commanded the squadron before it was disbanded in August 1945.

Returning to civilian life after the war, he resumed his university studies, becoming a chemist. He briefly served in the New Zealand Territorial Air Force and later became a farmer and then a teacher. He died in 2011, aged 91, at Tauranga.

== Early life ==
Stanley Franklin Browne was born on 29 October 1919 in Wellington, New Zealand. He was educated at Wellington Boys' College and went on to study medicine at Victoria University. In 1940, he applied to join the Royal New Zealand Air Force (RNZAF) and was accepted.

== Second World War ==
Browne formally entered the RNZAF on 23 March 1941 and commenced his training. Once this was complete, he was sent to the United Kingdom to serve with the Royal Air Force (RAF). He was posted to No. 485 Squadron as a sergeant in December. His new unit, equipped with the Supermarine Spitfire fighter, was based at Kenley and composed largely of New Zealand flying personnel.

=== Channel Front ===
Weather conditions meant there was little operational flying over the winter of 1941 and into early 1942 but the pace of operations soon picked up and the squadron began to regularly fly to German-occupied France, escorting bombers or carrying out sweeps to draw out the Luftwaffe. On 29 April, King George VI visited Kenley to observe the squadron while it was on an operation. Browne was the last pilot to land. He overshot slightly on his landing and required the services of a tractor to turn his Spitfire around before he could taxi to the dispersal area and meet the King.

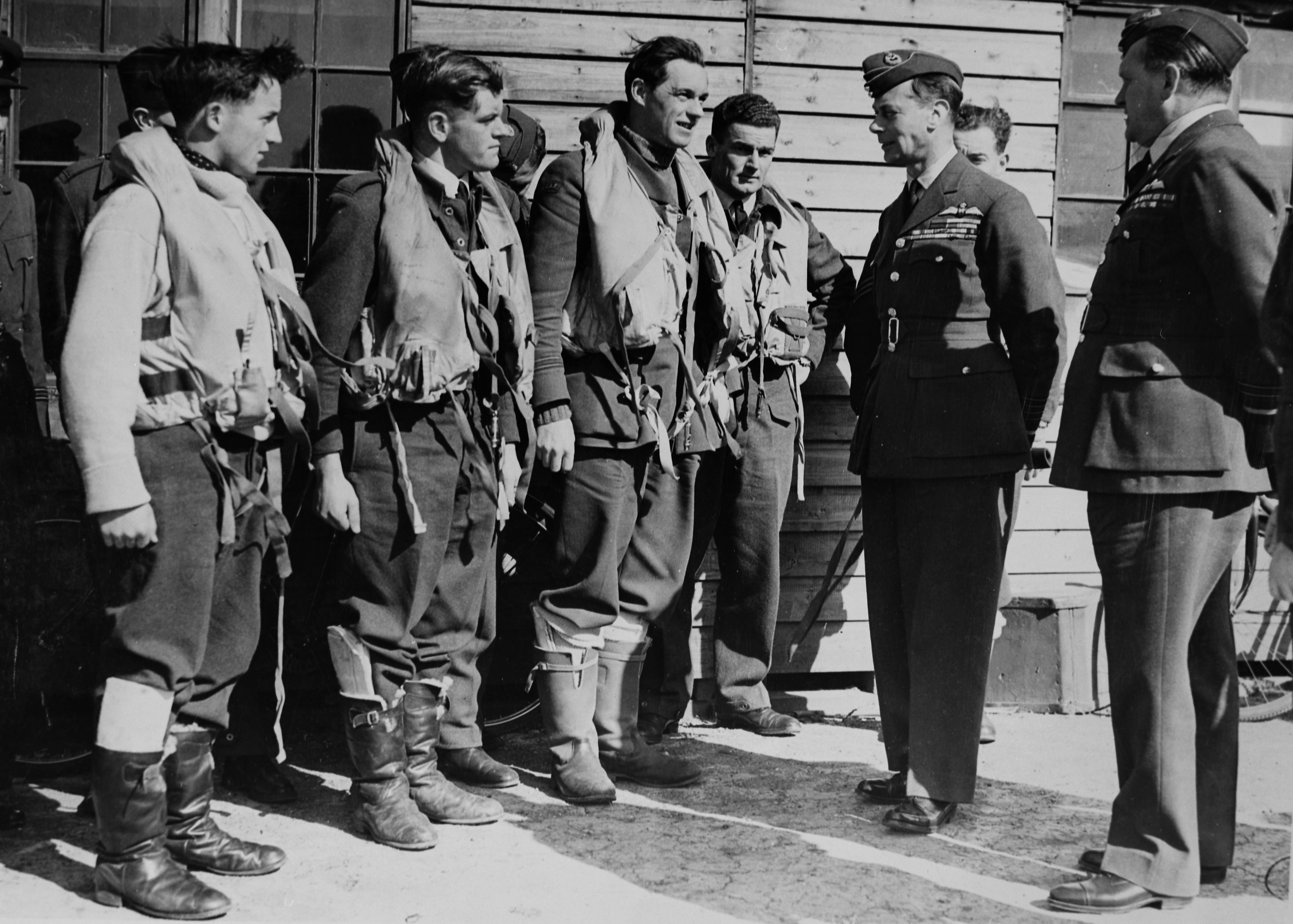
King George VI talking to pilots of No. 485 Squadron, on the occasion of his visit of 29 April 1942; Browne stands far left

On 31 May, No. 485 Squadron was taking part in a large sweep mounted by the RAF over northern France when it was intercepted by several Focke-Wulf Fw 190 fighters. He had become separated from his section leader, Johnny Checketts, and had to try to evade several pursuing Fw 190s. Despite being able to make it into low cloud, his Spitfire was damaged by cannon fire from the Fw 190s and he bailed out. He landed near Abbeville but with the help of local villagers, was able to evade Germans searching for him. He was sheltered at Amiens until false travel documentation was prepared for him by the French Resistance and, with another downed pilot, travelled south by rail where in mid-June they arrived at the border with Vichy France. However, as they crossed the border, the two were detected by the Vichy police and detained. Browne had taken photographs of military installations during his transit south but, fearing being treated as a spy, was able to destroy the negatives before they could be found. He was taken to Fort de la Revere, between Nice and Monte Carlo, where he met up with another pilot of No. 485 Squadron who had also been shot down on 31 May, Garry Barnett.

Browne escaped from Fort de la Revere in the first week of September as part of a breakout made by 50 prisoners. They had knocked down a wall in the shower block to gain access to the exterior of the prison. Although most of the escapees were captured within a few hours, Browne managed to get to Nice. Here, with the help of the Maquis, he linked up again with Barnett, who had made his own escape two weeks before Browne. They boarded a fishing boat, which already carried several other escapees, at a beach and sailed out to the Mediterranean where it was intercepted by a destroyer of the Royal Navy. The escapees were taken off and transported to Gibraltar where after an interrogation to confirm their identities, they were returned to the United Kingdom. Arriving on 9 October, Browne and Barnett rejoined No. 485 Squadron. They were the first two of what would be six pilots from the squadron to manage a return to the unit after having bailed out over enemy territory.

Browne was commissioned a pilot officer soon afterwards but on account of his spying activities while evading the Germans in France, it was deemed too risky for him to return to operations with No. 485 Squadron. He was transferred to another theatre of operations, North Africa. He was dispatched to Gibraltar, and until March 1943 ferried aircraft from there to Algiers. He was then posted to No. 93 Squadron.

=== North Africa and Sicily ===
At the time, his new unit was engaged in the Tunisian campaign, flying Spitfire Mk Vs from Souk-el-Khemis Airfield on fighter sweeps, bomber escort duties and Rhubarb missions. On 3 April, he damaged a Messerschmitt Bf 109 fighter near Sedjenane and then, two days later, shot down a Bf 109 over Tunis. He damaged another Bf 109 on 18 April. A week later, he destroyed another Bf 109 over Medjez el Bab. Once the fighting in North Africa ended, No. 93 Squadron shifted to Malta, flying from Hal Far in support of the Allied invasion of Sicily. It flew patrols over the invasion beaches and on 10 July, Browne destroyed a Junkers Ju 88 medium bomber. He destroyed another Ju 88 the next day over the coast but his Spitfire was damaged by friendly fire, the anti-aircraft guns of the battleship HMS Warspite firing on him. He bailed out over Sicily, becoming one of the first pilots to land on the island following the invasion. He was returned to Malta the next day.

On 13 July, while patrolling around the Augusta area, Browne and another pilot shared in the destruction of a Bf 109, without firing a shot at it. The duo had driven the German fighter close to the ground and it flew into a valley, where it crashed into the side while evading the pursuing Spitfires. Browne was awarded the Distinguished Flying Cross (DFC) in September for "gallantry and devotion to duty in the execution of air operations". He shot down a Bf 109 on 15 October, north of the Volturno River. At the end of the year he was taken off operations for a rest.

=== Return to Northern Europe ===
Posted to Catfoss to attend the Central Gunnery School there, Browne then proceeded to No. 61 Operational Training Unit as an instructor, teaching gunnery and bombing skills. After a course at the Fighter Leaders' School at Milfield, he was posted back to No. 485 Squadron, his old unit. It was operating Spitfire Mk IXs from France, flying as part of the 2nd Tactical Air Force and engaged in low-level operations, supporting the Allied ground forces as they advanced across France, into Belgium and then the Netherlands. This work was not without risk; on 5 January 1945, he damaged his Spitfire by flying too low and coming into contact with treetops.

In February, the squadron returned to the United Kingdom and were based at RAF Predannack in Cornwall where Hawker Typhoons were flown in preparation for a planned conversion to the similar Hawker Tempest. However, the change in aircraft never happened due to a shortage of Tempests, and the squadron went back to Europe after two months and reequipped with Spitfire Mk XVIs at Twente, in Holland. Now one of the squadrons of No. 132 Wing, it flew mainly reconnaissance missions and also targeted transportation infrastructure. The squadron rarely encountered the Luftwaffe.

By this time, Browne was a flight lieutenant and commander of the squadron's 'A' Flight. The squadron was based at Fassberg, in Germany, when the war in Europe ended. It would remain there on occupation duties, engaging in the odd ceremonial flypast for visiting dignitaries. In July, Browne was promoted acting squadron leader and given command of the unit. He led the squadron in its last flight on 24 August, flying from Fassberg to Lasham, before it was disbanded two days later.

Browne was awarded a Bar to his DFC in September and, returning to New Zealand, his service in the RNZAF officially ended on 26 January 1946. Having flown on over 250 operations, he was credited with the destruction of five enemy aircraft with a share in another destroyed, and two damaged.

== Later life ==
Following his return to New Zealand, Browne resumed his tertiary studies and became a chemical scientist. He also joined the New Zealand Territorial Air Force in December 1948, flying with No. 3 (Canterbury) Squadron as one of its flight commanders, before going onto the reserve of pilots in November 1951, where he remained for four years. He later turned to farming in Taumarunui, in the central North Island. The final years of his working life were spent as a teacher of the sciences at a high school in Taumarunui.

In 1990, Browne participated in the making of a This Is Your Life television show, in honour of his fellow pilot at No. 485 Squadron, Johnny Checketts. Browne died on 15 January 2011 in Tauranga. He was cremated and his remains interred at the city's Pyes Pa cemetery.
