= Reg Grant =

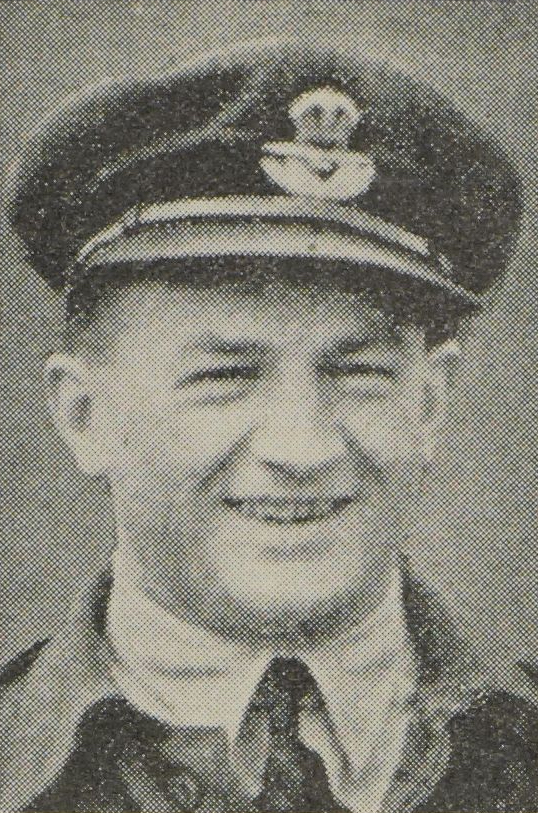
- Born: 3 June 1914; Woodville, New Zealand
- Died: 28 February 1944 (aged 29)
- Military career
- Allegiance: New Zealand
- Branch: Royal New Zealand Air Force
- Service years: 1939–1944
- Rank: Wing Commander
- Unit: No. 145 Squadron RAF
- Commands: No. 65 Squadron RAF (1943–44); No. 485 Squadron RNZAF (1942–43)
- Conflicts: Second World War; Channel Front
- Awards: Distinguished Flying Cross & Bar; Distinguished Flying Medal

Reginald Joseph Cowan Grant, DFC & Bar, DFM (3 June 1914 – 28 February 1944) was a New Zealand flying ace of the Royal New Zealand Air Force (RNZAF) in the Second World War.

Born in Woodville, he joined the RNZAF shortly after the outbreak of the Second World War. Posted to the United Kingdom to serve with the Royal Air Force, he initially flew with No. 145 Squadron. He later transferred to No. 485 Squadron, which he would eventually command for a period. After a rest off operations, he returned to duty in November 1943 as commander of No. 65 Squadron. In January 1944, he was promoted to wing commander and appointed wing leader of No. 122 Wing. He was killed in a flying accident two months later.

== Early life ==
Reginald Joseph Cowan Grant was born on 3 June 1914 in Woodville, a small town in New Zealand's North Island. His father, W. E. Grant, owned the Ponsonby Club Hotel in Auckland. He was educated at Mount Albert Grammar School and after completing his schooling, he commenced working as a metal spinner.

== Second World War ==
=== Flight training ===
Grant joined the Royal New Zealand Air Force (RNZAF) in November 1939. He proceeded to No. 2 Elementary Flying Training School as an airman pilot the following month. He was injured when he crashed his aircraft while attempting a landing on 19 January 1940 but despite this went on to No. 2 Flying Training School at Woodbourne. He gained his wings on 13 May but then spent most of the next four months on sick leave. He was promoted to sergeant pilot at the end of the year.

=== Channel Front ===
In January 1941, Grant was posted to the United Kingdom to serve with the Royal Air Force. After a period of further training at No. 53 Operational Training Unit, he was posted to No. 145 Squadron at Tangmere in March 1941. It subsequently moved to Manston, operating Supermarine Spitfire fighters from there during the period from June to July. He achieved his first aerial victory on 21 June, when he shot down a Messerschmitt Bf 109 fighter into the English Channel. This was followed four days later with another Bf 109, destroyed near Le Touquet. On 25 July he destroyed a further Bf 109 near Knokke. In August, Grant was awarded the Distinguished Flying Medal. The citation, published in the London Gazette, read:

This pilot has taken part in twenty-two operations over enemy territory during which he has destroyed two enemy aircraft and damaged several others. His keenness and devotion to duty have set an excellent example.

— London Gazette, No. 35241, 8 August 1941

In October, having flown on 84 operations, Grant was posted to No. 485 Squadron, a fighter squadron with mostly New Zealand flying personnel and equipped with Spitfires. The following month he was commissioned as a pilot officer. At the time, the squadron, flying as part of the Kenley Wing, was engaged in fighter sweeps to northern France. On 12 February 1942, No. 485 Squadron flew a mission escorting bombers attempting to disrupt the Channel Dash by the German battleships Scharnhorst and Gneisenau. During this mission, Grant shot down a Bf 109 5 miles (8.0 km) from Ostend.

=== Squadron command ===
In March, Grant was promoted to flight lieutenant and the same month he shot down a Focke-Wulf Fw 190 fighter inland of Calais while on a large scale sweep from Cap Gris Nez to Dunkirk; another Fw 190 was claimed as probably destroyed on the same sortie. In May, having been promoted to squadron leader, he took command of No. 485 Squadron and four months later was awarded the Distinguished Flying Cross (DFC). The published citation read:

Since being awarded the Distinguished Flying Medal, Squadron leader Grant has completed numerous sorties and has destroyed three enemy aircraft. He has set an excellent example of leadership and efficiency.

— London Gazette, No. 35721, 7 August 1942

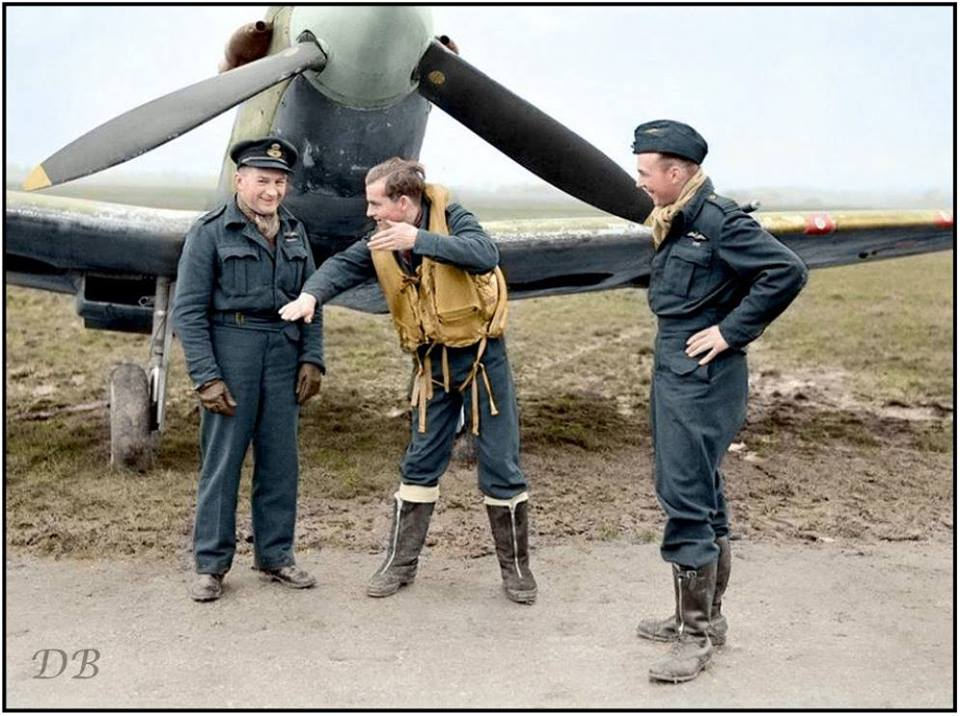
Grant (left) with John Pattison (centre) at RAF Westhampnett, West Sussex on 21 January 1943

Grant destroyed a Heinkel He 115 seaplane off the Dutch coast on 28 November. He had become separated from the flight of Spitfires he was leading on a sortie to attack shipping on canals in Holland and had encountered the seaplane, taking the opportunity to shoot it down. On 13 February 1943, the squadron took off for a mission across northern France and shortly after crossing the French coast the Spitfires sighted and engaged a force of Fw 190s. However, a further 20 German fighters attacked out of the sun. Ian Grant, Reg Grant's brother who also flew with No. 485 Squadron, was killed during the attack, one of three Spitfires to be shot down. Reg Grant engaged the Fw 190 that had carried out the attack and shot it down. Grant completed his operational tour in March, by this time having carried out over 180 sorties and destroying at least seven enemy aircraft. He was awarded a bar to his DFC in June. The citation for the bar read:

This officer has completed a very large number of sorties and has displayed exceptional keenness, a fine fighting spirit and great devotion to duty. He has destroyed at least 8 enemy aircraft.

— London Gazette, No. 36054, 15 June 1943

After a brief attachment at RNZAF headquarters in London, Grant spent some months in Canada as part of the New Zealand Air Mission, lecturing New Zealand air crew trainees and also touring the United States. He then returned to England and attended Fighter Leaders' School. In November he was given command of No. 65 Squadron, at the time operating the Spitfire Mk. IX but shortly to begin converting to the North American P-51 Mustang fighter. Early in 1944 Grant was promoted to wing commander and appointed wing leader of No. 122 Wing, of which No. 65 Squadron was part. On 21 January, while flying a Spitfire Mk. IX, he shared in the destruction of a Messerschmitt Me 210 heavy fighter over St. Pol. On 28 February, he took off for a sortie across the English Channel. Shortly after takeoff, in cloud, the engine of his fighter cut out. After ordering the wing to carry on without him, he turned back to base. On coming out of cloud at 1,000 feet (300 m), he bailed out but was too low for his parachute to open properly and fell to his death.

Buried at Brookwood Military Cemetery, Grant was credited with having destroyed seven German aircraft, a half share in another aircraft shot down and one probably destroyed.
