= RMS Rangitata =

Ocean passenger liner (1929–1962)

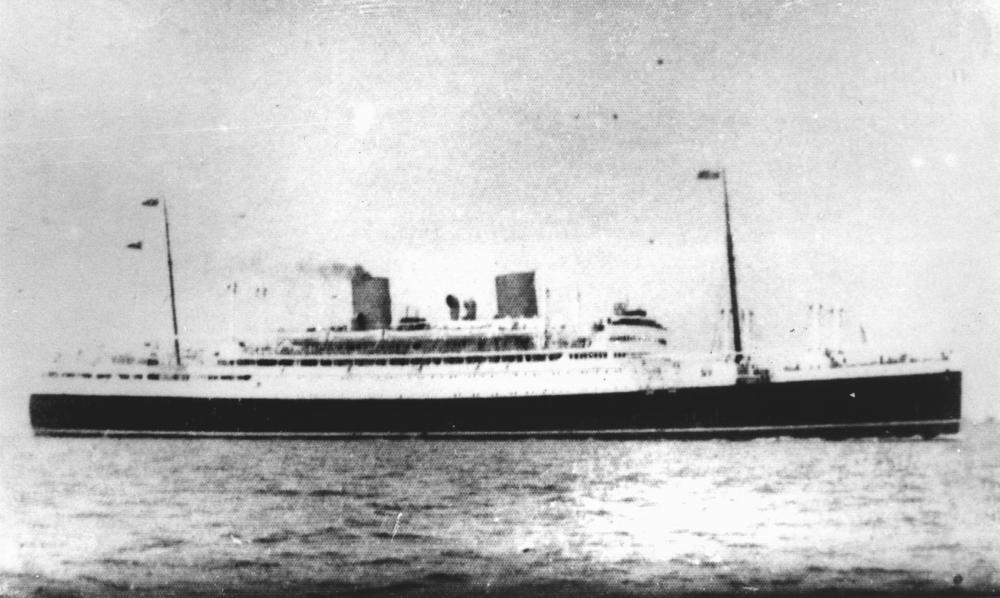

History

United Kingdom
- Name: RMS Rangitata
- Owner: New Zealand Shipping Company
- Port of registry: Plymouth
- Builder: John Brown & Company, Clydebank
- Yard number: 517
- Launched: 26 March 1929
- Fate: Scrapped in 1962

General characteristics
- Type: Ocean liner
- Tonnage: 16,737 GRT, 10,315 NRT
- Length: 531.0 ft (161.8 m)
- Beam: 70.2 ft (21.4 m)
- Draught: 33 feet 9 inches (10.29 m)
- Depth: 38.1 ft (11.6 m)
- Propulsion: As built: 2 × 5 cyl 2SCSA Sulzer oil engines; twin screws; 9300 bhp; After 1949: 2 × 6 cyl 2SCSA Doxford opposed piston oil engines; twin screws; 15000 bhp
- Speed: 15 knots (17 mph) (original engines); 16 knots (18 mph) (after 1949)

RMS Rangitata was an ocean passenger liner that was built in Scotland in 1929 and scrapped in Yugoslavia in 1962. She was operated by the New Zealand Shipping Company between London and Wellington, New Zealand, via the Panama Canal with her two sister ships Rangitiki and Rangitane.

In World War II, in 1940 Rangitata sailed from Liverpool with 113 evacuated children under the Children's Overseas Reception Board (CORB) scheme on 28 August 1940, bound for New Zealand through the Panama Canal in convoy OB 205, with Volendam which was carrying children bound for Canada, and was torpedoed, with 113 CORB children arriving safely in New Zealand.

She also served as a troopship, for example in Convoy US1 taking New Zealand troops to the Middle East in January 1940. She had returned to civilian service by 1949.

A scale model of Rangitata can be found in the New Zealand Maritime Museum in Auckland.

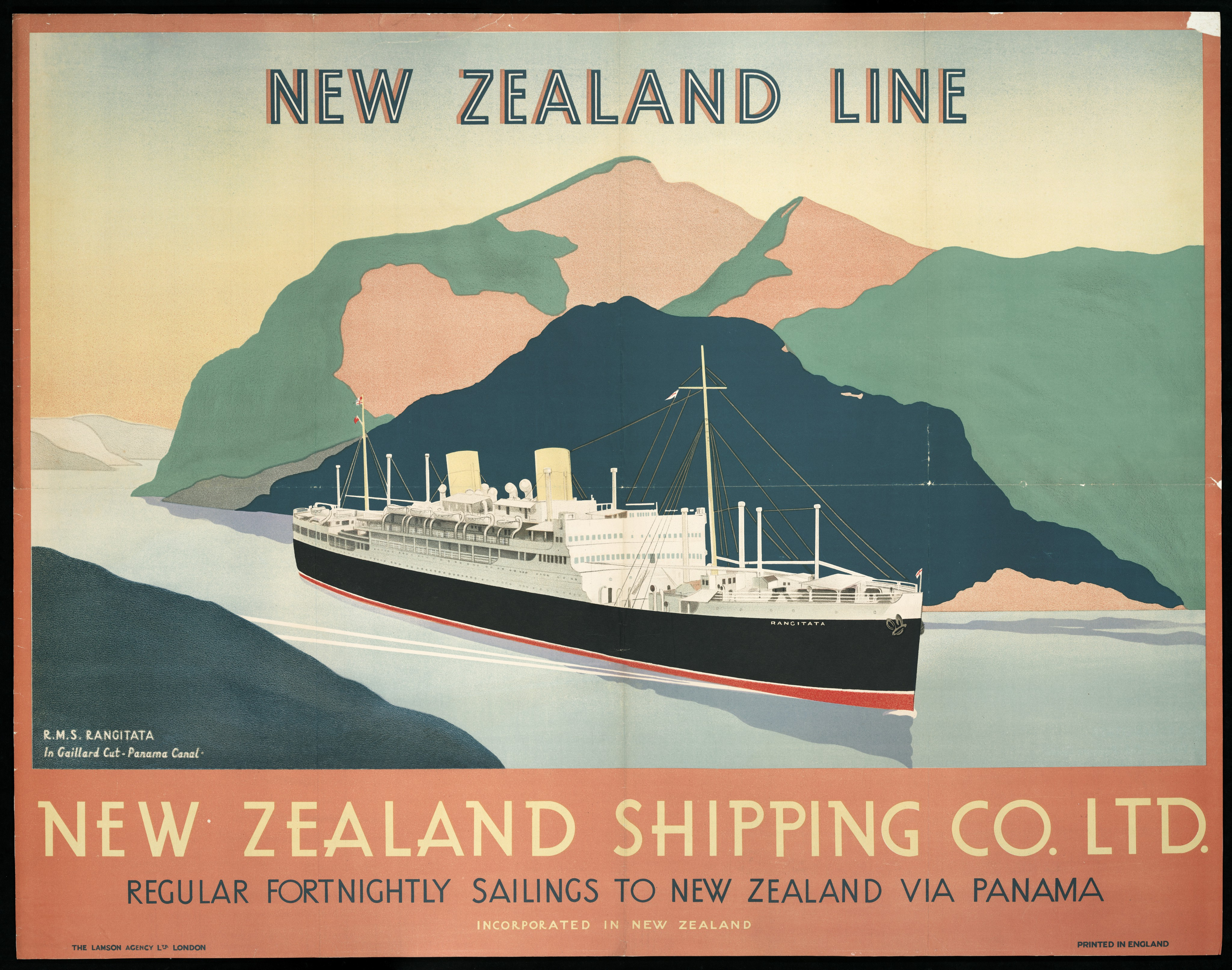
RMS Rangitata, Gaillard Cut, Panama Canal
