= RAF Findo Gask =

Former RAF station in Perth, Scotland

RAF Findo Gask No. 25 SLG
- Perth, Perth & Kinross in Scotland

Site information
- Type: Satellite station
- Owner: Air Ministry
- Operator: Royal Air Force
- Controlled by: RAF Flying Training Command

Location
- Shown within Perth and Kinross RAF Findo Gask (the United Kingdom)
- Coordinates: 56°22′28″N 003°36′09″W

Site history
- Built: 1940/41
- In use: June 1941 – 1948
- Battles/wars: European theatre of World War II

Airfield information
- Elevation: 110 metres (361 ft) AMSL
Runways
Direction	Length and surface
01/19	1,005 metres (3,297 ft) Sommerfeld Tracking
07/25	1,784 metres (5,853 ft) Sommerfeld Tracking
11/29	1,143 metres (3,750 ft) Sommerfeld Tracking

RAF Findo Gask was a Royal Air Force satellite station located 7 mi (11 km) west of Perth, Scotland used during the Second World War.

== History ==
RAF Findo Gask was opened on 14 June 1941 as a Flying Training Airfield. It would appear that it had three runways made of Sommerfeld Track (a form of wire netting based surface). The tower is of the "Watch Office for All Commands" (12779/41) type, with an extra floor and reduced size front windows. There were eight hangars, One T2 hangar (415 ft × 117 ft or 126 m × 36 m), three Blisters (85 × 85 × 20 ft or 25.9 × 25.9 × 6.1 m in height), four Dorman Long Blisters (90 × 90 × 20 ft or 27.4 × 27.4 × 6.1 m in height).

There seems to have been a flooding problem at the airfield due poor drainage; it was often waterlogged and muddy and continued flooding led to the eventual abandonment of the airfield in 1944, when all training moved to RAF Tealing. The airfield also proved to be unsuitable for the North American Mustang.

In late 1944 the airfield was used by units from the Polish Army for training purposes.

After the war ended the airfield was designated as Camp 233, and the accommodation was used to house German prisoners of war, who worked the land in the area.

The airfield was then home to a maintenance unit, No. 260 Maintenance Unit, and used as Equipment Disposal sub site from November 1945 until 1948. A satellite of No. 44 Maintenance Unit RAF also used the site from August 1945

The Perth and District Motor Club held motorcycles races at Gask (also at Errol Aerodrome and Balado).

There are no signs of the airfield runways today and the area is mainly used for agriculture, although one area of the airfield near the tower does appear to have had housing built on it.

The control tower, previously in a derelict state, is now being restored as a private home.

== Operational units and aircraft ==
Unit	Period	Aircraft
No. 309 Polish Fighter-Reconnaissance Squadron 'A' & 'C' Flights	26 October 1942 to 8 March 1943	Westland Lysander
No. 309 Polish Fighter-Reconnaissance Squadron 'B' Flight	15 December 1942 to 10 January 1943	North American Mustang Mk. I

It was also used as a "Relief Landing Ground" from 12 July 1943 to 2 November 1944 for No. 9 (Pilots) Advanced Flying Unit based at RAF Errol.
