= Robert Dafforn =

British flying ace of WWII

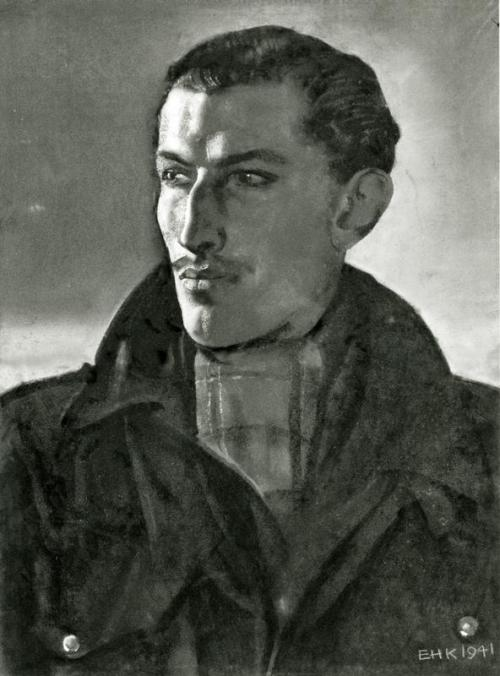
- Portrait of Dafforn, painted by the war artist Eric Kennington in 1941
- Born: 2 March 1916; Horton, Berkshire, England
- Died: 9 September 1943 (aged 27); Sutton Bridge, England
- Burial place: St.Mary’s Churchyard, White Waltham, England
- Military career
- Allegiance: United Kingdom
- Branch: Royal Air Force
- Service years: 1937–1943
- Rank: Squadron Leader
- Unit: No. 501 Squadron
- Commands: No. 229 Squadron
- Conflicts: Second World War: Battle of France; Battle of Britain; Siege of Malta
- Awards: Distinguished Flying Cross

Robert Dafforn, DFC (2 March 1916 – 9 September 1943) was a British flying ace who served in the Royal Air Force (RAF) during the Second World War. He was credited with having shot down at least eight aircraft.

Born in Horton, Berkshire, Dafforn was training with the RAF at the time of the outbreak of the Second World War. Once his training was completed, he was posted to No. 501 Squadron in September 1939. He flew through the Battle of France and in the following aerial campaign over southeast England until he was wounded in December 1940. He soon returned to the squadron and was awarded the Distinguished Flying Cross early the following year. He carried out instructing duties from October 1941 to January 1942, at which time he was posted to the Middle East. After a period of training, in April he was assigned to No. 229 Squadron on Malta, briefly leading the unit until he was shot down and wounded. After a period of hospitalisation, he returned to the United Kingdom and recommenced instructing duties. He was killed in a flying accident on 9 September 1943.

== Early life ==
Robert Chippindall Dafforn was born on 2 March 1916, in Horton, Berkshire, in England. He was educated at Harrow School, his final year being 1934, after which he commenced working for the Bank of England. He attempted to join the Royal Air Force Volunteer Reserve (RAFVR) in 1936, but was declined on the basis of being underweight. A subsequent application to the RAFVR was successful, Dafforn having completed a program of physical training in the interim. He trained at No. 8 Elementary and Reserve Flying Training School at Woodley from October 1937.

== Second World War ==
At the time of the outbreak of the Second World War, Dafforn was partway through a four-month training commitment with the Royal Air Force, based at the Air Fighting School at St Athan. His training was curtailed and he was posted to No. 501 Squadron in mid-September as a sergeant pilot. At the time, the squadron was based at Filton and operated Hawker Hurricane fighters as part of the aerial defences around Bristol. In November, it moved south to Tangmere but saw little activity for the next few months. During his time at Tangmere, Dafforn was commissioned as a pilot officer.

=== Battle of France ===
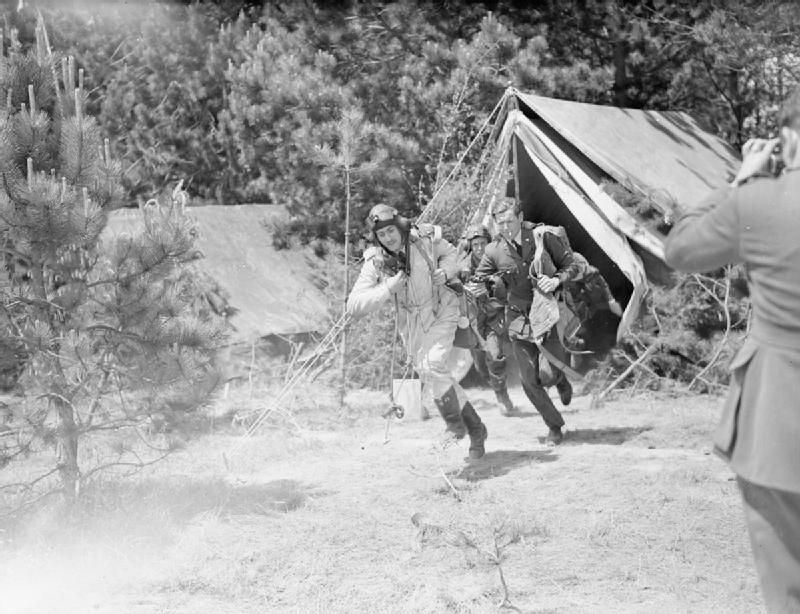
Pilots of No. 501 Squadron being scrambled from the airfield at Bétheniville, May 1940

Following the German invasion of France and the Low Countries that commenced on 10 May 1940, No. 501 Squadron was immediately sent to France and began operating from Bétheniville the next day, 11 May. It was promptly in action, Dafforn destroying a Dornier Do 17 medium bomber to the south of Rheims that day. He shot down a Heinkel He 111 medium bomber, also near Rheims, on 14 May. He claimed both a Messerschmitt Bf 110 heavy fighter on 19 May and a He 111 the following day as probably destroyed.

By this time, No. 501 Squadron was having to retreat into the southwest of France as the Germans advanced. Dafforn destroyed one He 111 and damaged another on 27 May, both in the Blagny-Abancourt area. These were his last aerial victories in France, for on 18 June, the surviving Hurricanes were flown from Dinard to St Helier on the island of Jersey. From here, it provided aerial cover for the evacuation of the British Expeditionary Force from Cherbourg and then flew on to Croydon, where it reassembled on 21 June.

=== Battle of Britain ===
At Croydon, No. 501 Squadron received reinforcements and replacement Hurricanes but as part of No. 11 Group, it was soon drawn into the aerial fighting over the southeast of England as the Battle of Britain commenced. As the Luftwaffe's campaign progressed, the squadron, which was now based at Gravesend was scrambled multiple times a day to intercept incoming raids. Dafforn damaged a Junkers Ju 87 dive bomber southeast of Dover on 29 July and then on 12 August, destroyed another Ju 87 off North Foreland. He shot down a Do 17 to the south of Folkestone on 15 August and the same day damaged two Ju 87s, also near Folkestone. The following day he damaged yet another Ju 87.

On 18 August, what is now known as The Hardest Day, his Hurricane was damaged by Bf 110s, forcing Dafforn to bail out near Biggin Hill, which he accomplished without injury. Near Ramsgate on 24 August he damaged a Junkers Ju 88 medium bomber. With five other pilots, he combined to destroy a Do 17 over the Thames estuary on 11 September. The intensity of operations began to reduce from October and on the last day of the month, Dafforn, by this time a flight commander, shot down a Messerschmitt Bf 109 fighter to the northwest of Maidstone. On 2 December, he was wounded during an engagement with some Bf 109s and crash-landed his Hurricane at Detling. Dafforn was awarded the Distinguished Flying Cross the following month.

=== Later war service ===
Dafforn returned to No. 501 Squadron once he recovered from his wounds. By this time, the squadron was back at Filton and in April it began to reequip with the Supermarine Spitfire fighter. Soon afterward it switched to offensive operations in German-occupied France. Dafforn, who had been promoted to flying officer in July, was the last of the squadron's original wartime pilots when in October, he was posted away to No. 56 Operational Training Unit (OTU) at RAF Sutton Bridge to serve as an instructor.

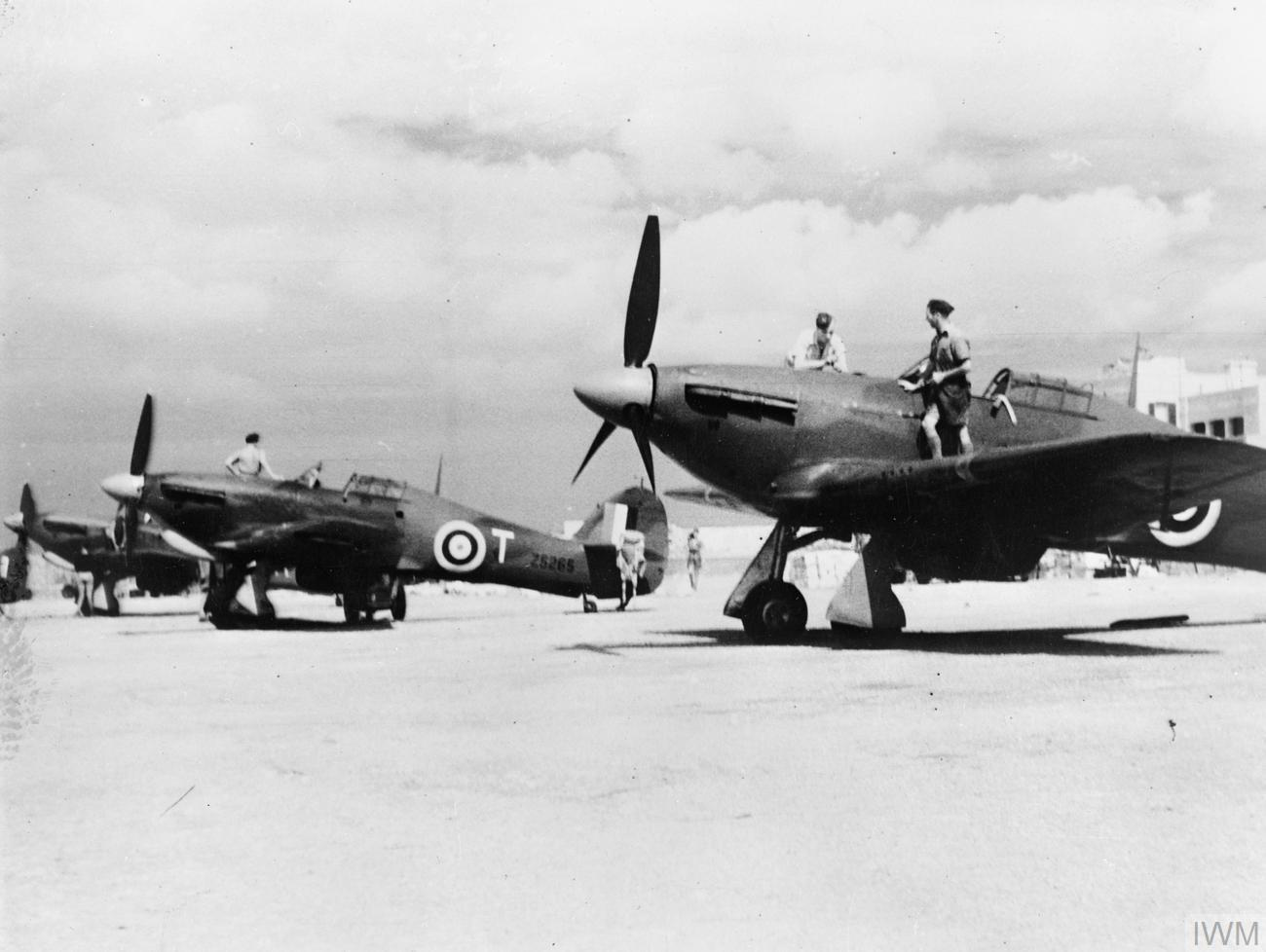
Hawker Hurricane fighters lined up on the airfield at Hal Far, Malta

In January 1942, Dafforn was posted to the Middle East. He sailed to West Africa and flew a Hurricane from the airfield at Takoradi on a ferry flight to Egypt. On 1 April he was sent to El Ballah for training at the Air Fighting School and Conversion and Refresher School, in preparation for operations in the Western Desert campaign. However, partway through the month, he was posted to Malta, where he was assigned to No. 229 Squadron as part of the island's aerial defence. The squadron had been based at Hal Far since March, using Hurricanes. Two days after Dafforn's arrival on Malta, he was promoted to acting squadron leader and appointed commander of the squadron. On his second operational flight, carried out on 26 April, he was wounded in a dogfight and crash-landed back at Hal Far. Although the wounds, cannon shell fragments to his legs, one arm, and his lower back, were relatively minor, during his brief hospitalisation he became ill with undulant fever for several weeks. In the meantime, the squadron's losses in aircraft and personnel saw it disbanded at the end of April.

After 14 weeks of hospital treatment, Dafforn was medically repatriated back to the United Kingdom in early August. He still required medical care for a time at Hendon and it was not until October that he returned to duty, with a posting to No. 52 OTU at Aston Down, as the commander of the Night Flying Squadron. From March to June 1943, he flew Spitfires from Ibsley with No. 54 Squadron as a supernumerary. He was then appointed chief flying instructor at the Central Gunnery School at RAF Sutton Bridge. On 9 September, Dafforn was returning to the airfield after an air gunnery exercise when he performed a turn at a low altitude. The wingtip of his Spitfire made contact with the ground, and the aircraft crashed into the ground. Dafforn was killed in the accident.

At the time of his death, Dafforn was credited with having destroyed eight aircraft, two of which were shared with other pilots. In addition to two aircraft deemed as probably destroyed, he is credited with five damaged aircraft. He is buried in the churchyard of St Mary's at White Waltham.
