= RAF Tealing =

Former RAF station in Angus, Scotland

RAF Tealing
- Tealing, Angus in Scotland

Site information
- Type: Royal Air Force station
- Code: TG
- Owner: Air Ministry
- Operator: Royal Air Force
- Controlled by: RAF Fighter Command; 1942-44; RAF Flying Training Command 1944-

Location
- Shown within Angus RAF Tealing (the United Kingdom)
- Coordinates: 56°31′38″N 002°58′20″W

Site history
- Built: 1941/42
- In use: March 1942 - June 1945
- Battles/wars: European theatre of World War II

Airfield information
- Elevation: 122 metres (400 ft) AMSL
Runways
Direction	Length and surface
03/21	967 metres (3,173 ft) Concrete
09/27	1,281 metres (4,203 ft) Concrete

Royal Air Force Tealing or more simply RAF Tealing is a former Royal Air Force station located at Tealing, Angus, Scotland.

== Overview ==
During the Second World War, the Air Ministry built an aerodrome at Tealing and in March 1942 No. 56 Operational Training Unit (OTU) was relocated to RAF Tealing from RAF Sutton Bridge in south Lincolnshire, equipped with Hawker Hurricane, Miles Master and Westland Lysander aircraft. The number of pilots training at the unit varied from about 35 to 40 in 1942, reaching a peak of 150 in 1943.

It was at the aerodrome that Tealing's most famous visitor arrived. On 20 May 1942, a strange four engined aircraft appeared in the circuit at Tealing, piloted by Endel Puusepp. It was one of the first Russian TB7s to visit Britain and it brought Vyacheslav Molotov, Soviet Foreign Minister and Deputy Chairman of the State Committee of Defence, on a military mission to meet with Sir Winston Churchill at Chequers. RAF Tealing was probably chosen to attract as little attention as possible and for security reasons, as there was a local news blackout at the time.

Molotov was given the choice of two aircraft in which to continue his journey to England. The aircraft he did not select—as was later revealed by Sir Archibald Hope, Senior Controller of RAF Fighter Command in Scotland in 1942—crashed in the Vale of York, killing various members of Molotov's staff and senior RAF personnel. Molotov arrived safely in London for the signing of the Anglo-Soviet Treaty on 26 May 1942.

== Timeline ==
- March 1942: Site opened.
- March 1942 to July 1944: No. 56 OTU moved here from RAF Sutton Bridge with Hawker Hurricanes, Westland Lysanders and Miles Masters. Training for all types of fighter, ground and anti-shipping exercises.
- October 1943: Renamed 1 Combat Training Wing and then 1 Tactical Exercise Unit.
- February 1944: Hawker Hurricanes replaced with Supermarine Spitfires.
- August 1944 to June 1945: No. 9 (P) AFU, Flying Training Command with Miles Masters then Harvards.

== Operational units and aircraft ==
Unit	From	To	Aircraft	Version
No. 63 Squadron RAF	1 May 1939	September 1939	Hawker Hart de Havilland Tiger Moth	? ?
No. 527 Squadron RAF	28 April 1944	8 November 1945	Supermarine Spitfire	Mk. Vb

== Other units/wings ==
=== No. 56 Operational Training Unit (27 March 1942 – 5 October 1943) ===
Formed at RAF Sutton Bridge from No. 6 OTU on 1 November 1940 within No. 81 Group to train fighter pilots for RAF Fighter Command, using Hawker Hurricanes. In March 1942 it moved to RAF Tealing and in April 1943 it passed to the control of No. 9 Group. It disbanded on 5 October 1943. It was then redesignated No. 1 Combat Training Wing (changed to No. 1 Tactical Exercise Unit at a later date).

In the event of a German invasion the OTU's 'E' and 'F' Flights would have become No. 556 Squadron to operate within the Peterhead Sector.

The unit was reformed on 15 December 1944, at Milfield in No. 12 Group, equipped with both Hawker Typhoon and Hawker Tempest V's until disbanding on 14 February 1946.

=== No. 1 Combat Training Wing (5 October 1943 – 1 January 1944) ===
See No. 56 Operational Training Unit.

=== No. 1 Tactical Exercise Unit (1 January - 31 July 1944) ===
See No. 56 Operational Training Unit.

=== No. 9 (Pilots) Advanced Flying Unit (12 September 1944 – 21 June 1945) ===
Satellite Landing Ground for No. 9 (Pilot) Advanced Flying Unit ((P)AFU) based at RAF Errol.

=== HQ, No. 70 (Signal) Wing (25 August 1945 – 31 May 1946) ===
Satellite to RAF Inverness
