= No. 229 Squadron RAF =

Defunct flying squadron of the Royal Air Force

- Active: 20 August 1918 – 31 December 1919; 6 October 1939 – 29 April 1942; 3 August 1942 – 10 January 1945
- Country: United Kingdom
- Branch: Royal Air Force
- Motto: Be bold
- Engagements: Battle of Britain

Insignia
- Squadron Badge: A boar's head erased, pierced by a sword The badge indicates triumph over a powerful and ferocious enemy
- Squadron Codes: RE (Oct 1939 – May 1941); HB (May 1941 – Apr 1942, Jan 1944 – Apr 1944); X (Aug 1942 – Jan 1944); 9R Apr 1944 – Jan 1945

No. 229 Squadron RAF was a squadron of the Royal Air Force, and is an officially accredited Battle of Britain Squadron. It became No. 603 Squadron RAF in January 1945.

== History ==
=== Formation and World War I ===
No. 229 Squadron RAF was formed on 20 August 1918 at Great Yarmouth, made up from Nos 428, 429, 454 and 455 Flights of the Royal Naval Air Service. It flew a mixture of types including Short Type 184 and Type 320, Sopwith Baby and the closely related Fairey Hamble Baby, and Fairey IIIC, for coastal patrols. It was officially disbanded on 31 December 1919.

=== World War II ===
On 6 October 1939, No. 229 Squadron was reformed at RAF Digby as a fighter squadron and was equipped with Bristol Blenheims for a role protecting shipping. It began convoy patrols on 21 December but also carried out night training and radar trials. In March 1940, the squadron was re-equipped with Hawker Hurricane fighters and soon after the German invasion of France in May 1940, one flight was sent to reinforce the French-based fighter squadrons for eight days during the Battle of France. After flying defensive patrols over the East Coast, the squadron moved to RAF Northolt in September and remained there for the rest of the Battle of Britain. The future air chief marshal Frederick Rosier was a flight commander on the squadron during this time.

In December 1940 the squadron moved to Merseyside and in May 1941 left for the Middle East. The squadron's pilots were embarked in HMS Furious and flown off to Malta where, after refuelling, they moved on to Egypt, two separate detachments being convoyed fifteen days apart by the carrier. On arrival the first detachment was attached to No. 274 Squadron RAF to cover the evacuation of Crete and the second detachment was divided between Nos. 6, 208 and 213 Squadrons. A flight was transferred from No. 274 to No. 73 Squadron on 11 June as the latter's C Flight, and remained detached in Egypt at the end of July. It was September before the squadron began functioning as an independent unit. Fighter sweeps were flown over Libya until the end of March 1942 when the squadron was transferred to Malta to reinforce the island's fighter defences. On 29 April 1942, with its commanding officer, Squadron Leader Robert Dafforn having been shot down, it ceased to function; its surviving aircraft and pilots was absorbed by other units.

On 3 August 1942, the squadron was reformed at RAF Ta Kali, Malta from No. 603 Squadron and flew Supermarine Spitfire fighters in the defence of Malta during the last months of the siege. In January 1943 the island's squadrons took the offensive, flying sweeps over Sicily, and in May 229 Sqn began to operate fighter-bombers. After covering the landings in Sicily, in July 1943, the squadron remained in Malta for defensive duties until January 1944, when it moved to Sicily.

On 1 April 1944, it was withdrawn for transfer to the UK and re-assembled at RAF Hornchurch on 24 April. During Operation Overlord (the Allied invasion of Normandy) it was equipped with the Spitfire IX F, operating from RAF Detling in Air Defence of Great Britain (ADGB), though under the operational control of RAF Second Tactical Air Force (2nd TAF). After providing escort missions over the Low Countries it re-equipped with Spitfire XVIs in December, and then flew fighter-bomber sweeps until renumbered No. 603 Squadron RAF on 10 January 1945.

== See also ==
- List of Royal Air Force aircraft squadrons
