= Allan Wright =

British flying ace (1920–2015)

Allan Richard Wright
- Born: 12 February 1920; Teignmouth, Devon
- Died: 16 September 2015 (aged 95); Bradworthy, Devon
- Military career
- Allegiance: United Kingdom
- Branch: Royal Air Force
- Service years: 1938–1967
- Rank: Group captain
- Unit: No. 92 Squadron
- Commands: Air Fighting Development Unit
- Conflicts: Second World War: Battle of France; Battle of Britain; Circus offensive
- Awards: Distinguished Flying Cross & Bar; Air Force Cross; King's Commendation for Valuable Service in the Air

Group Captain Allan Richard Wright, DFC & Bar, AFC (12 February 1920 – 16 September 2015) was a Royal Air Force (RAF) fighter pilot and flying ace of the Second World War. He was credited with having destroyed at least fourteen German aircraft.

From Devon, Wright was a flight cadet at the RAF's Cranwell College at the time of the outbreak of the Second World War. Entering service with the RAF, he was posted to No. 92 Squadron. He flew Supermarine Spitfire fighters during the aerial fighting over Dunkirk during the later stages of the Battle of France and then in the subsequent Battle of Britain, claiming several aerial victories. He was awarded the Distinguished Flying Cross (DFC) in recognition of his successes. He flew in part of No. 92 Squadron's campaign during the 1941 Circus offensive, claiming further victories and being awarded a Bar to his DFC. Rested from operations with a posting as an instructor in July 1941, he spent much of the remainder of the war in staff and instructing posts but did spend a period on operations flying with a night fighter squadron. He remained in the RAF in the postwar period, until his retirement in 1967 as a group captain. He died in 2015, at the age of 95.

== Early life ==
Allan Richard Wright was born in Teignmouth in Devon, England, on 12 February 1920. His father was an air commodore in the Royal Air Force (RAF) and would later reach the rank of acting air vice-marshal. He was schooled at St Edmund's College, Hertfordshire, and then entered the RAF's Cranwell College as a flight cadet in April 1938.

== Second World War ==
On the outbreak of the Second World War, flight cadets at Cranwell were called up for full time service in the RAF. Wright continued his training and once this was completed, in October 1939, he was commissioned as a pilot officer and posted to No. 92 Squadron. This unit was based at Tangmere and equipped with Bristol Blenheim heavy fighters. The following March, the squadron converted to Supermarine Spitfire fighters becoming operational with these on 9 May. It made its first sortie on 23 May, patrolling over Dunkirk. On this occasion, Wright destroyed one Messerschmitt Bf 110 heavy fighter and damaged two others. The following day, the squadron was again patrolling over Dunkirk when Wright damaged a Heinkel He 111 medium bomber. On 2 June he shot down a Messerschmitt Bf 109 fighter.

=== Battle of Britain ===
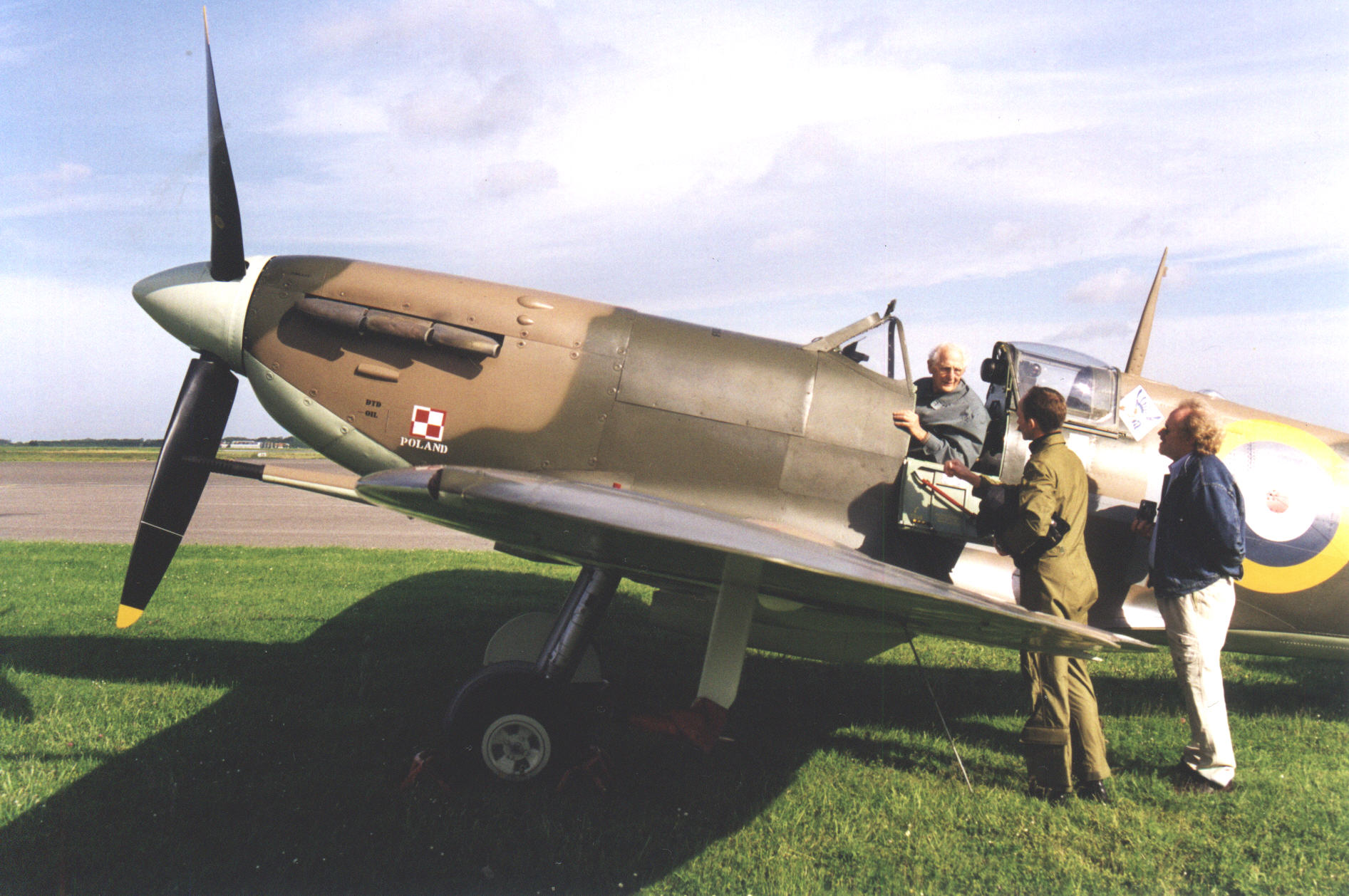
In 1999 Allan Wright sits in Spitfire V BM597 at Calais, France, during the filming of a Time Team archaeological dig of a Spitfire

In mid-June No. 92 Squadron was based at Pembrey in Wales, from where it conducted convoy patrols. On 14 August, Wright shared in the destruction of a He 111 over Hullavington. Two weeks later, on the night of 29 August, he shot down a He 111 over Bristol. On 9 September, the squadron was moved to Biggin Hill, from where it would be heavily engaged in the Battle of Britain. Two days later, Wright shot down a He 111 to the east of London and probably destroyed a Bf 109 over Folkestone. He damaged a Bf 109 near Tunbridge Wells on 14 September and claimed a Bf 109 as probably destroyed over Canterbury the next day.

On 19 September, Wright probably shot down a Junkers Ju 88 medium bomber over Dover. He destroyed a Dornier Do 17 medium bomber near Tenterden on 26 September. The next day he was appointed a flight commander in the squadron. During the course of that day, he shot down a Ju 88 and damaged two more, shared in the destruction of a He 111 and damaged a Do 17, all in the vicinity of Sevenoaks. On 30 September, he destroyed two Bf 109s, one near Redhill and the other over the English Channel. In a subsequent sortie that day, his Spitfire was damaged in an engagement with a Bf 109 and, slightly wounded, Wright made a crash landing at Shoreham. His injuries, cannon splinters in his legs, required treatment at Southlands Hospital. In recognition of his successes over the previous months, he was awarded the Distinguished Flying Cross (DFC). The citation, published in The London Gazette on 22 October, read,

One night in August 1940, this officer displayed great determination and skill in destroying a Heinkel 111, under difficult conditions. Pilot Officer Wright has consistently shown a keen desire to engage the enemy on all occasions. He has brought down a total of four enemy aircraft and has badly damaged four more.

— London Gazette, No. 34976, 22 October 1940

Wright recovered from his wounds and returned to No. 92 Squadron; on 6 December he destroyed a Bf 109 over Dover.

=== Circus offensive ===
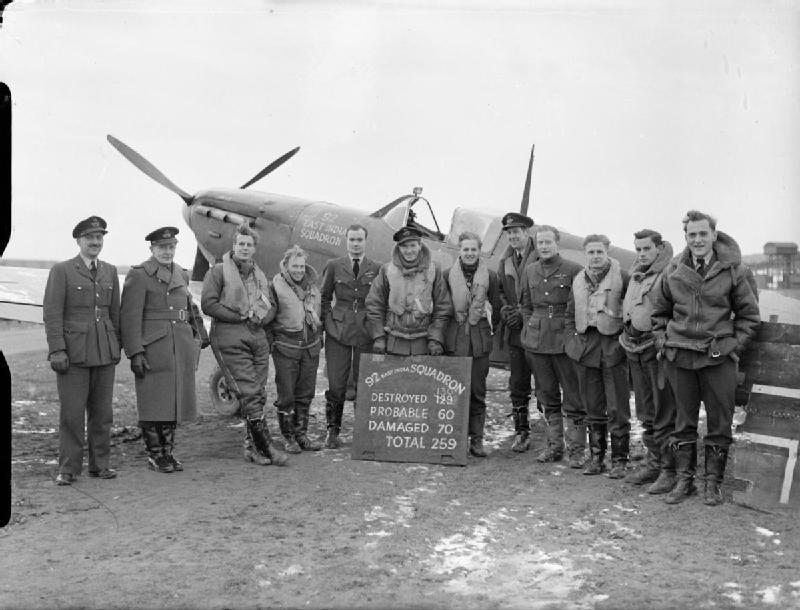
Pilots of No. 92 Squadron in late 1940/early 1941 with their scoreboard; Wright stands third from right

In February 1941, No. 92 Squadron reequipped with upgraded Spitfire VBs and began carrying out sorties to German-occupied Europe as part of the RAF's Circus offensive. On 13 March, Wright damaged two Bf 109s and then on 16 May, over the English Channel near Dungeness, shared in the shooting down of a Bf 109. He was credited with the probable destruction of a Bf 109 over Béthune on 17 June June. On a sortie providing cover to Blenheim light bombers attacking railway infrastructure at Hazebrouck on 25 June, Wright probably destroyed another Bf 109 to the south of Gravelines. The next day he shot down a Bf 109 over Dunkirk. His successes saw him awarded a Bar to his DFC in mid-July. The published citation read

This officer has been continually engaged in operational flying since May, 1940. He has led his flight and sometimes his squadron with great skill and determination. Flight Lieutenant Wright has destroyed at least nine enemy aircraft. On one occasion he flew his damaged aircraft back from France making a successful landing despite extreme difficulties. His keenness and devotion to duty have been outstanding.

— London Gazette, No. 35219, 15 July 1941

=== Later war service ===
Later in July Wright was posted to No. 59 Operational Training Unit at Crosby-on-Eden, where he was in charge of one of its flights. In September, he was briefly assigned to No. 9 Group as a staff officer before going to the headquarters of Fighter Command the following month. He was promoted to flight lieutenant at about the same time. In February 1942, he became chief instructor at the Pilot Gunnery Instructor Wing of the Central Gunnery School based at Sutton Bridge.

In October 1942, Wright went to the United States, one of four officers selected to go there and train personnel of the United States Army Air Force before they were posted to serve in the United Kingdom. In March 1943, he was posted to No. 29 Squadron. Stationed at West Malling, the squadron was equipped with the Bristol Beaufighter heavy fighter which were used for night intruder missions. On a sortie carried out on the night of 3 April, Wright destroyed one Ju 88 and damaged a second near Calais, his final aerial victories. In the 1943 Birthday Honours, announced on 2 June, he received the King's Commendation for Valuable Service in the Air.

For the remainder of the war, Wright worked on training and fighter tactics. He commanded the Air Fighting Development Unit at Wittering from December until August 1944, at which time he went to the Army Staff College at Camberley. He was awarded the Air Force Cross in September. In December he was in charge of training in light aircraft at No. 12 Group at Watnall and in early 1945, he was transferred to El Bellah in Egypt where he commanded the fighter wing of the Middle East Advanced Bombing and Gunnery School.

== Postwar service ==
Remaining in the RAF in the postwar period in the substantive rank of flight lieutenant, but retaining an acting rank of squadron leader, Wright served at the Air Ministry for a time. His substantive rank was made up to squadron leader in August 1947. In 1950, he went to Cranwell as a lecturer and was promoted to wing commander two years later. He returned to the Air Ministry and worked on air defence planning. A later posting, once he qualified on jet fighters, was as wing leader at Waterbeach. Towards the end of his career he commanded the Ballistic Missile Early Warning Station at Fylingdales in Yorkshire. He retired as a group captain on 12 February 1967.

== Later life ==
Wright retired to North Devon and took up farming. He died on 16 September 2015 at Bradworthy in Devon. He is credited with having shot down fourteen aircraft, three of which were shared with other pilots, and seven more damaged. He is also credited with the probable destruction of five aircraft.
