= Andrew McDowall =

British flying ace of WWII

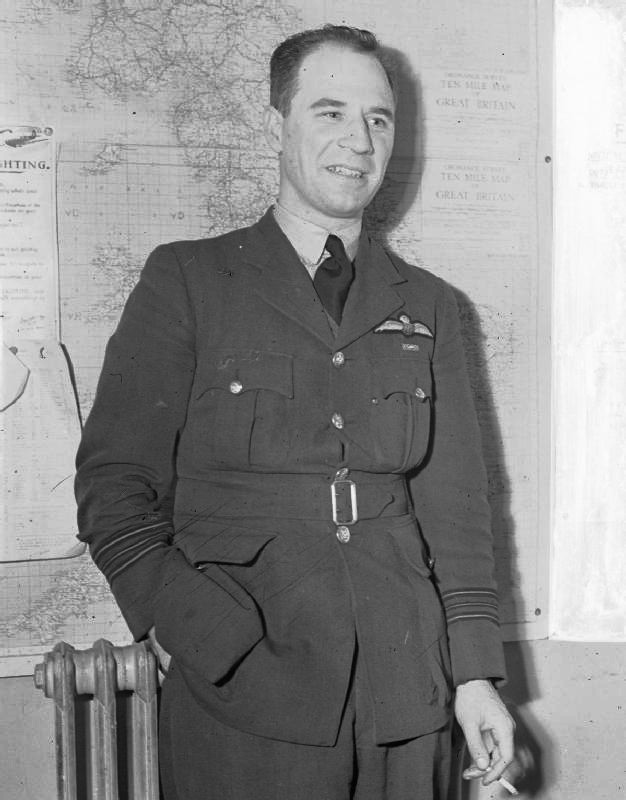
- Born: 26 June 1913; Kirkinner, Wigtownshire, Scotland
- Died: 26 November 1981 (aged 68); Derby, England
- Military career
- Allegiance: United Kingdom
- Branch: Royal Air Force
- Rank: Wing Commander
- Commands: No. 616 Squadron (1944–1945); No. 232 Squadron (1942)
- Conflicts: Second World War: Battle of Britain; The Blitz; Dieppe Raid; Operation Diver; Western Allied invasion of Germany
- Awards: Air Force Cross; Distinguished Flying Medal & Bar; Mention in Despatches (2)

Andrew McDowall AFC, DFM & Bar (26 June 1913 – 26 November 1981) was a British flying ace with the Royal Air Force (RAF) during the Second World War. He was credited with having destroyed at least thirteen German aircraft.

Born in the Scottish town of Kirkinner, McDowall joined the Royal Air Force Volunteer Reserve prior to the Second World War. Called up for service on the outbreak of hostilities, he completed his training and was posted to No. 602 Squadron. He flew extensively with the squadron during the Battle of Britain, destroying a number of German aircraft and being awarded the Distinguished Flying Medal twice. After a period off operations as an instructor, he commanded No. 232 Squadron during the Dieppe Raid. He was later a test pilot for the Gloster Aircraft Company, working on the development of the Gloster Meteor jet fighter. From July 1944 to May 1945, he commanded the RAF's first jet fighter squadron. Returning to civilian life after the war, he worked for Gloster as a test pilot and was awarded the Air Force Cross for this work. He died in Derby, aged 68.

== Early life ==
Andrew McDowall was born on 26 June 1913 in Kirkinner, Wigtownshire, in Scotland. Once he finished his schooling, he worked as an engineer. At some point he joined the Royal Air Force Volunteer Reserve (RAFVR), serving initially as an aircraftsman in No. 602 Squadron of the Auxiliary Air Force. He subsequently commenced training as a sergeant pilot.

== Second World War ==
A few days prior to the outbreak of the Second World War, McDowall was called up for service in the Royal Air Force (RAF). It was not until May 1940 that his training was completed and he rejoined No. 602 Squadron. The squadron was based at Grangemouth, from where it conducted patrols with its Supermarine Spitfire fighters over the Firth of Forth. McDowall, flying a night sortie on 23 July, destroyed a Heinkel He 111 medium bomber over East Linton that crashed into the sea.

=== Battle of Britain ===
In August, No. 602 Squadron moved to Westhampnett, in the south of England, as part of the Tangmere Wing. The squadron was regularly scrambled to try and intercept bombers prior to their crossing the English coastline but later in the campaign, when the Luftwaffe's focus shifted to London, more of the squadron's inceptions were achieved over England. McDowall destroyed a Messerschmitt Bf 109 fighter over the airfield at the Royal Naval Air Station Ford on 18 August, what is now known as The Hardest Day. He shot down a He 111 over Selsey Bill on 26 August. Another Bf 109 was destroyed by McDowall to the south of Mayfield on 9 September and two days later he shot down a Messerschmitt Bf 110 heavy fighter 5 mi (8.0 km) from Selsey Bill. On Battle of Britain Day, 15 September, McDowall probably destroyed a Dornier Do 17 medium bomber over Beachy Head. On the last day of the month, he destroyed a Junkers Ju 88 medium bomber and shared in the destruction of a second. His run of successes saw him awarded the Distinguished Flying Medal (DFM). The announcement was made on 8 October; the citation, published in The London Gazette, read:

This airman has led his section on many occasions and has destroyed at least six enemy aircraft, one of which he destroyed in a brilliant head-on attack at night. His capable leadership has contributed largely to the many successes of his section.

— London Gazette, No. 34945, 8 October 1940

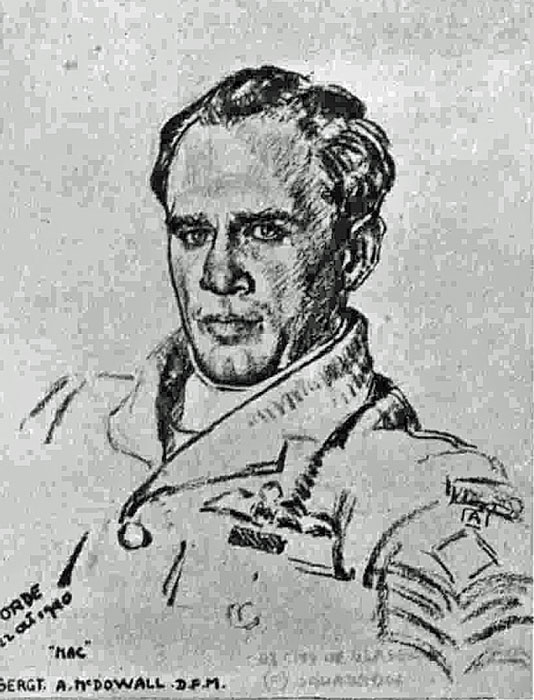
Portrait of McDowall, drawn by Cuthbert Orde, an official war artist, October 1940

McDowall continued to have successful engagements; he destroyed one Ju 88 near St Catherine's Point and also claimed the probably destruction of a second in the area on 27 October. Two days later he shot down a pair of Bf 109s near Biggin Hill. A further Bf 109 was destroyed by McDowall near Dungeness on 30 October. A week later he destroyed two more Bf 109s to the south of the Isle of Wight, one being shared with another pilot. The following month, by which time he held the rank of pilot officer, having been commissioned on 14 December, he was awarded a Bar to his DFM. The published citation read:

Sergeant McDowall has shown outstanding ability as a fighter pilot. He has destroyed at least fourteen enemy aircraft, and his leadership and courage have been of the highest order.

— London Gazette, No. 35015, 17 December 1940

=== Later war service ===
By this time, No. 602 Squadron had ended its service in the south of England and had shifted to Prestwick in Scotland. From here for the next few months, the squadron mostly carried out convoy patrols. In April 1941 McDowall was posted to No. 245 Squadron where he was to command one of its flights. His new unit, equipped with the Hawker Hurricane fighter, was based at Aldergrove in Northern Ireland from where it patrolled over Belfast and the Irish Sea. Promoted to flying officer in early May, he was rested from operations in July.

McDowall carried out instructing duties at No. 52 Operational Training Unit at Debden until April 1942, by which time he was a flight lieutenant and holding an acting squadron leader rank. He was then appointed commander of No. 232 Squadron. His command, which had just been reformed after its predecessor had been combined with another squadron in Java, was based at Atcham and operated Spitfires. It became operational the following month carrying patrols. It moved south briefly to Gravesend in mid-August from where it participated in the Dieppe Raid on 19 August. McDowall led the squadron as it provided cover for the shipping transporting troops to and from Dieppe during the day.

The month after the Dieppe Raid, McDowall was posted to the headquarters of No. 13 Group in a staff role. His substantive rank was made up to squadron leader in October 1943 and he became a test pilot for Gloster Aircraft Company. He was involved in the development of the Gloster Meteor jet fighter. He was mentioned in despatches on 14 January 1944 and again later in the year on 8 June.

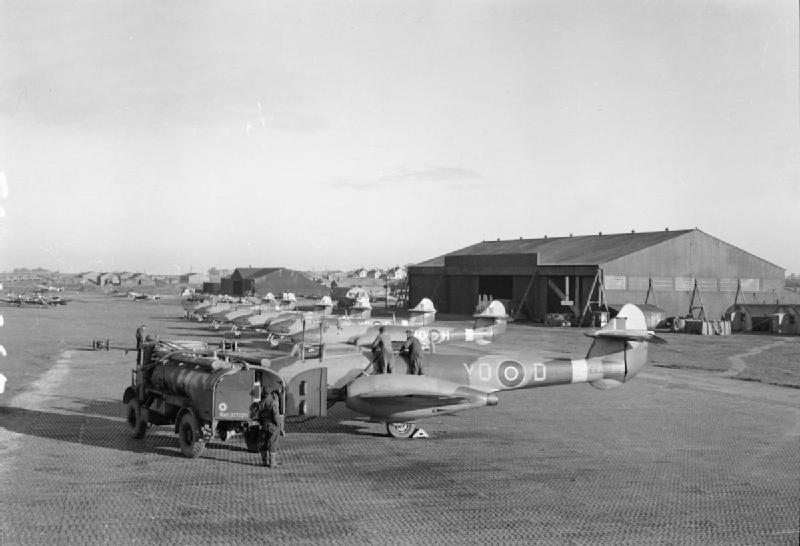
A line up of Gloster Meteor jet fighters of No. 616 Squadron at Manston

In July McDowall was promoted to wing commander and appointed commander of No. 616 Squadron. The squadron was converting to the Meteor, thus becoming the RAF's first jet fighter squadron. Based at Manston, it commenced using the Meteors operationally in early August as part of Operation Diver, the RAF's campaign against German V-1 flying bombs targeting southern England. By the end of the year it was stationed at Colerne and receiving upgraded Meteor Mk IIIs. Early in 1945, a flight, led by McDowall, was detached to Melsbroek airfield in Belgium. Then in March 1945 the entire squadron moved to Gilze-Rijen airfield in the Netherlands, from where it started carrying out armed reconnaissances into Germany, looking for targets of opportunity. On 24 April while on a sortie over northern Germany he caught a Ju 88 on the ground at Nordholz airfield and destroyed it. This was the first claim for a destroyed aircraft by a Meteor pilot. McDowall relinquished command of the squadron at the start of the following month.

== Later life ==
After the war, McDowall returned to civilian life although he remained in the RAFVR. He joined Rolls-Royce Limited as a test pilot and subsequently returned to Gloster, carrying out similar test duties. He was a recipient of the Air Force Cross for this work. In June 1958, he relinquished his commission in the RAFVR. He died in Derby on 26 November 1981. McDowall is credited with the destruction of thirteen German aircraft, although two of these were shared with other pilots, plus one destroyed on the ground. He also believed to have probably destroyed two other aircraft.
