= RAF Sutton Bridge =

Former RAF station in Lincolnshire

RAF Sutton Bridge
- Sutton Bridge, Lincolnshire in England
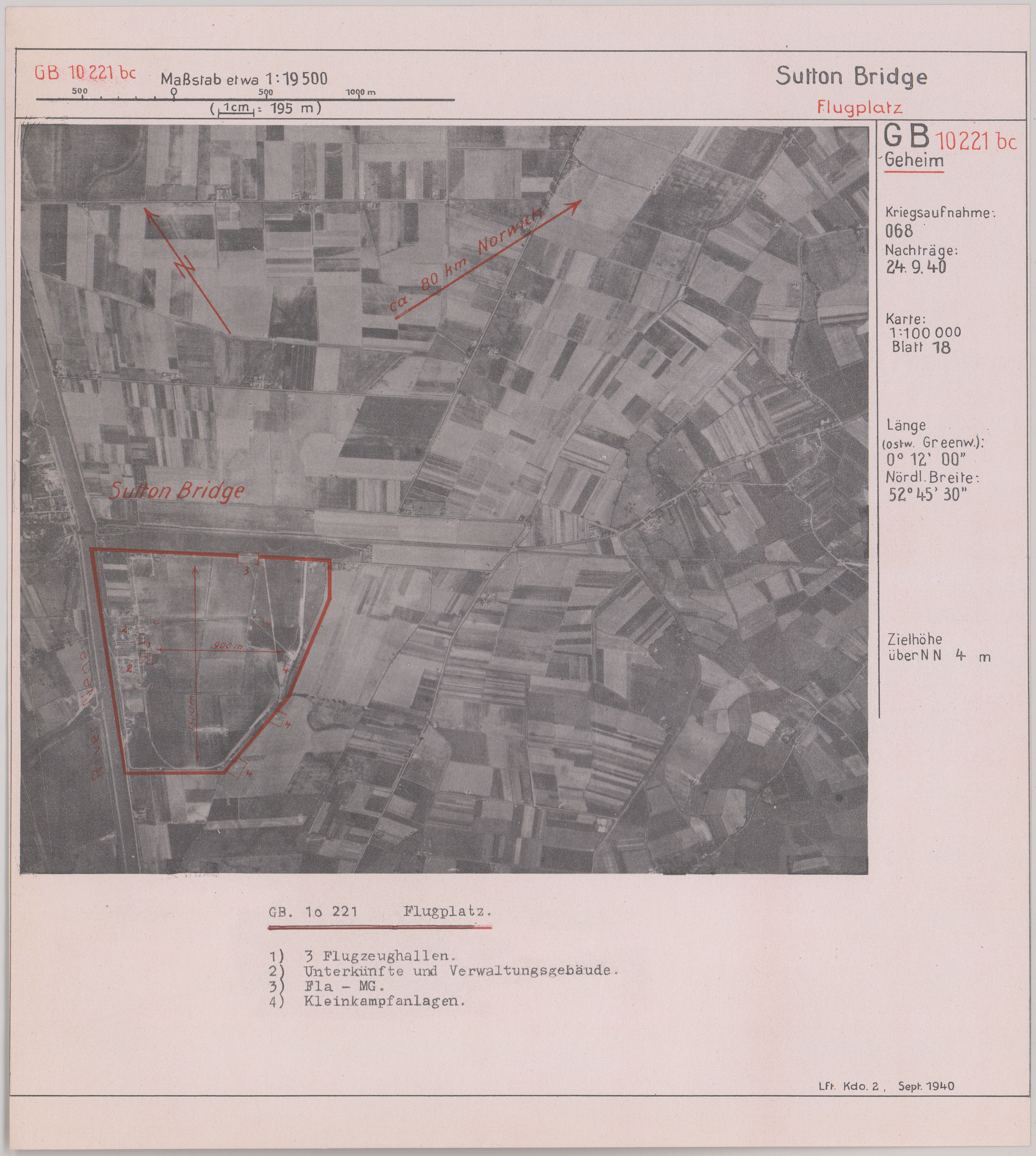
- RAF Sutton Bridge on a target dossier of the German Luftwaffe, 1940

Site information
- Type: Royal Air Force station
- Owner: Air Ministry
- Operator: Royal Air Force
- Controlled by: RAF Flying Training Command

Location
- Shown within Lincolnshire RAF Sutton Bridge (the United Kingdom)
- Coordinates: 52°45′35.65″N 0°11′41.55″E

Site history
- Built: 1926
- In use: 1926 - 1958
- Battles/wars: European theatre of World War II

Airfield information
- Elevation: 3 metres (10 ft) AMSL
Runways
Direction	Length and surface
08/26	1,052 metres (3,451 ft) PSP (Pierced steel planking) - Marsden Matting
13/31	732 metres (2,402 ft) Sommerfeld Tracking
NE/SW	1,280 metres (4,199 ft) Grass

Royal Air Force Sutton Bridge or more simply RAF Sutton Bridge is a former Royal Air Force station found next to the village of Sutton Bridge in the south-east of Lincolnshire. The airfield was to the south of the current A17, and east of the River Nene, next to Walpole in Norfolk.

== History ==
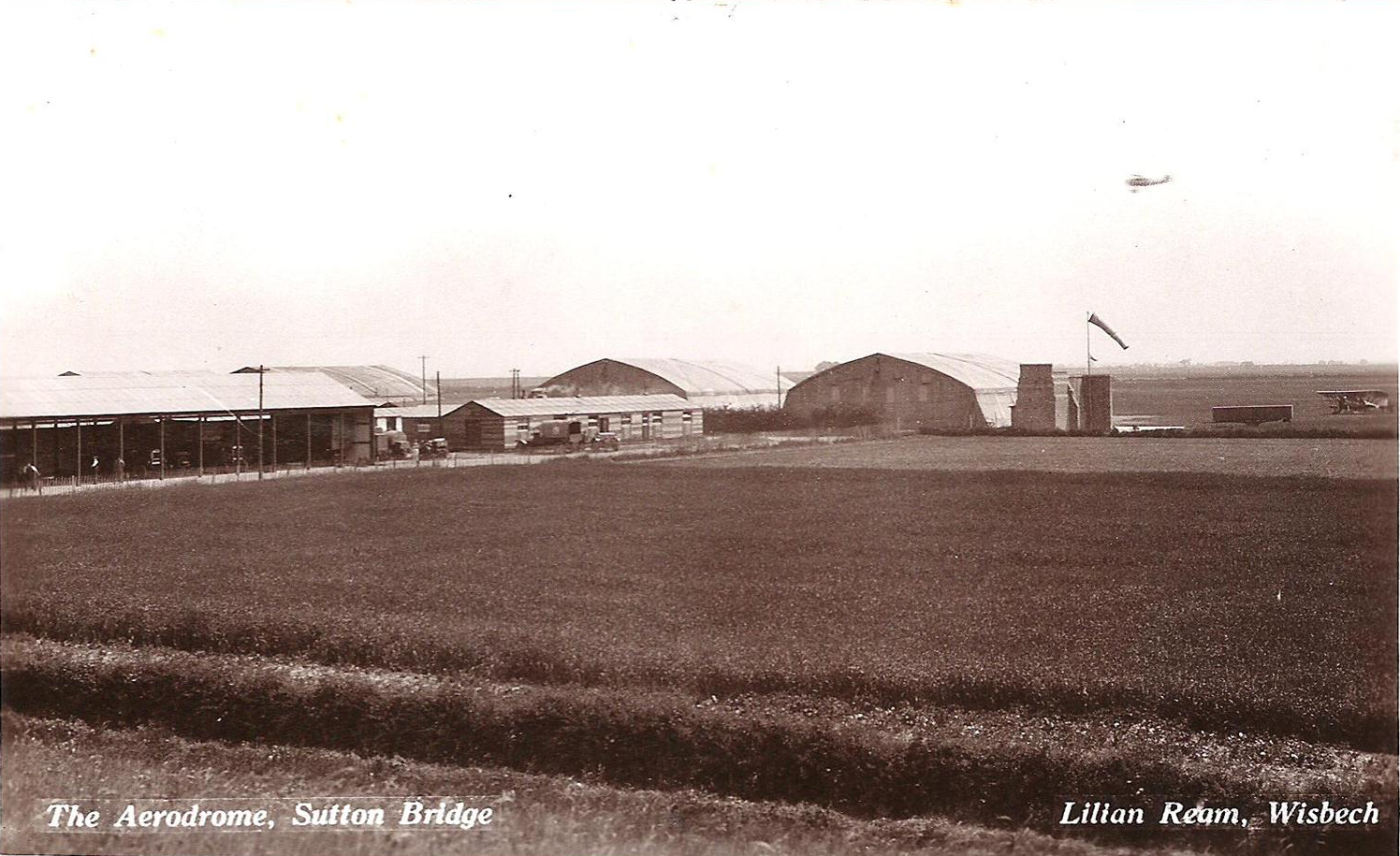
R.A.F. Practice Camp Sutton Bridge late 1920s. View from west side airfield embankment main entrance. Photograph by Lilian Ream.

On 1 September 1926 the Air Ministry established R.A.F. Practice Camp Sutton Bridge on 289 acres of acquired agricultural land next to Sutton Bridge village from Guy's Hospital Agricultural Estates. It was the responsibility of the first camp commandant, Flight Lieutenant A. Mackenzie, to establish the base camp and its flying ground, to set up, operate and maintain ground and towed targets for practice machine gun firing and bomb dropping by the Royal Air Force and Fleet Air Arm biplane squadrons. Its principal gunnery range was to be located along the coastal marshland on The Wash in close vicinity to the small village of Gedney Drove End (see Holbeach Marsh Range). Although an RAF aircraft gunnery practice camp from 1926, from 1 January 1932 it was officially renamed to No. 3 Armament Training Camp Sutton Bridge, subsequently No. 3 Armament Training Station Sutton Bridge, and later simply RAF Sutton Bridge.

In October 1939 No. 266 Squadron RAF reformed at RAF Sutton Bridge as a fighter squadron and from January 1940 operated the Supermarine Spitfire, becoming the RAF's second Spitfire fighter Squadron after RAF Duxford’s No. 19 Squadron RAF.

In March 1940 No. 6 Operational Training Unit (OTU) was formed and arrived at RAF Sutton Bridge for training fighter pilots, commanded by Squadron Leader Philip Campbell Pinkham, with a complement of Hawker Hurricane, Miles Mentor and North American Harvard aircraft, including one Gloster Gladiator, its first pilot pool came from No. 11 Group RAF transferring to No. 12 Group RAF of RAF Fighter Command. No. 6 OTU RAF was re-numbered in November 1940 to No. 56 OTU RAF and remained at RAF Sutton Bridge until relocating in March 1942 to RAF Tealing.

The single most important function of RAF Sutton Bridge was as the home for the RAF's Central Gunnery School (CGS) from April 1942 to March 1944. Here for the first time, fighter pilots of RAF Fighter Command and air gunners of RAF Bomber Command were trained together so as to become Gunnery Instructors who would then be sent to airfields around the country to pass on newly acquired skills. In the words of Group Captain Allan Wright "the Central Gunnery School itself was the first of its kind in the world".

== Runway ==
4,200 ft Grass runway, orientated North-East/South-West (NE/SW).
2,400 ft x 50 ft Sommerfeld Tracking runway, numbered 13/31.
3,450 ft x 150 ft PSP (Pierced steel planking) Marsden Matting runway, numbered 08/26.

== Units present at Sutton Bridge ==
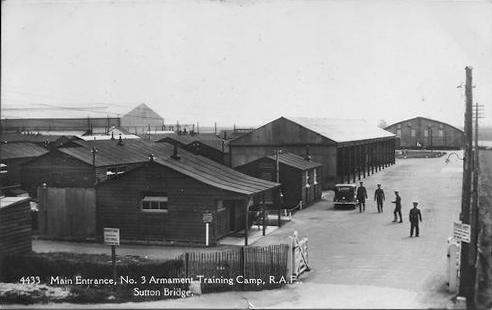
1930s, No. 3 Armament Training Camp, RAF, Sutton Bridge: Airfield west side embankment main entrance. Visible in the far left background is the new Hinaidi type aircraft hangar built during the 1930s replacing two of the airfield's original four Bessonneau type aircraft hangars.

- R.A.F. Practice Camp, 1 September 1926 ― 31 December 1931
- Sutton Bridge Station Flight, April 1929 ― September 1941
- No. 3 Armament Training Camp, 1 January 1932 ― 28 February 1936
- No. 3 Armament Training Station, 1 March 1936 ― 3 September 1939
- No. 3 Recruits Sub-Depot, 3 September 1939 ― (re-designated)
- No. 3 Recruits Training Pool, September 1939 ― 16 November 1939 (unit deactivated)
- No. 264 Squadron RAF, 1 November 1939 ― 25 November 1939
- No. 266 Squadron RAF, 30 October 1939 ― 29 February 1940
- Towed Target Flight, later Station Flight, Sutton Bridge, 1 January 1940 ― 30 November 1940
- No. 254 Squadron RAF, 9 December 1936 ― 27 January 1940
- No. 6 Operational Training Unit RAF (OTU), 10 March 1940 ― 31 October 1940
- No. 56 Operational Training Unit RAF (formerly No. 6 OTU), 1 November 1940 ― 31 March 1942
- No. 1489 Flight, later Target Towing Flight, Sutton Bridge, 1 October 1941 ― ca. April 1942
- No. 2884 Squadron RAF Regiment (LAA Squadron), between 1 June 1943 ― 30 November 1943
- RAF Central Gunnery School (CGS), 1 April 1942 ― 23 February 1944
- No. 2750 Squadron RAF Regiment (Duxford), with detachment at RAF Wittering, 1 June 1943 ― 31 October 1943
- No. 7 (Pilots) Advanced Flying Unit RAF, 1 March 1944 ― 1944
- No. 16 (Pilots) Service Flying Training School (SFTS), 1944 ― August 1944
- No. 7 (French Air Force) Service Flying Training School (SFTS), September 1944 ― November 1944
- No. 1 Ground & Target Towing Flight (United States Army Air Forces USAAF), May 1944 ― November 1944
- No. 7 (Pilots) Advanced Flying Unit RAF, 21 June 1944 ― November 1944
- No. 7 Service Flying Training School RAF (SFTS), November 1944 ― April 1946
- No. 58 Maintenance Unit RAF, 20 July 1954 ― 1 November 1957

== Airfield ground defences ==
During the Second World War, airfield ground defence at RAF Sutton Bridge consisted an array of Anti-Aircraft (AA) weapons, such as Bofors 40 mm cannons and Lewis or Vickers machine guns, manned by some 66 officers and men of "D" Company 1st Battalion of the Cambridgeshire Regiment, from defences and pillboxes distributed around the airfield station perimeter. Two such pillboxes still stand and can be found along the former airfield perimeter (see Pillbox #1: 52°45′22.45″N 0°12′21.04″E, Pillbox #2: 52°45′41.31″N 0°12′25.52″E). As most air raid warnings occurred during the hours of darkness, a searchlight battery operated by 10 men of the Royal Engineers was also present.

=== Decoy "Q" site ===
Expecting attacks by the German Luftwaffe on RAF airfields, the Air Ministry implemented a plan for secret decoy airfields in 1939. Sites intended to attract night raids were designated "Q" sites, while decoys for day raids were known as "K" sites. RAF Sutton Bridge had a "Q" site, four miles north-east of the airfield (52°46′49.77″N 0°18′35.13″E), on cultivated farmland in Norfolk, at Terrington Marsh, near the village of Terrington St Clement. The "Q" site consisted of an elaborate lighting system, including adjustable-intensity electric lights, to simulate a runway flare path, and other runway lights. Obstruction lights were also installed, to prevent Allied aircraft from mistakenly landing on the decoy dummy airfield.

=== Air raid attacks ===
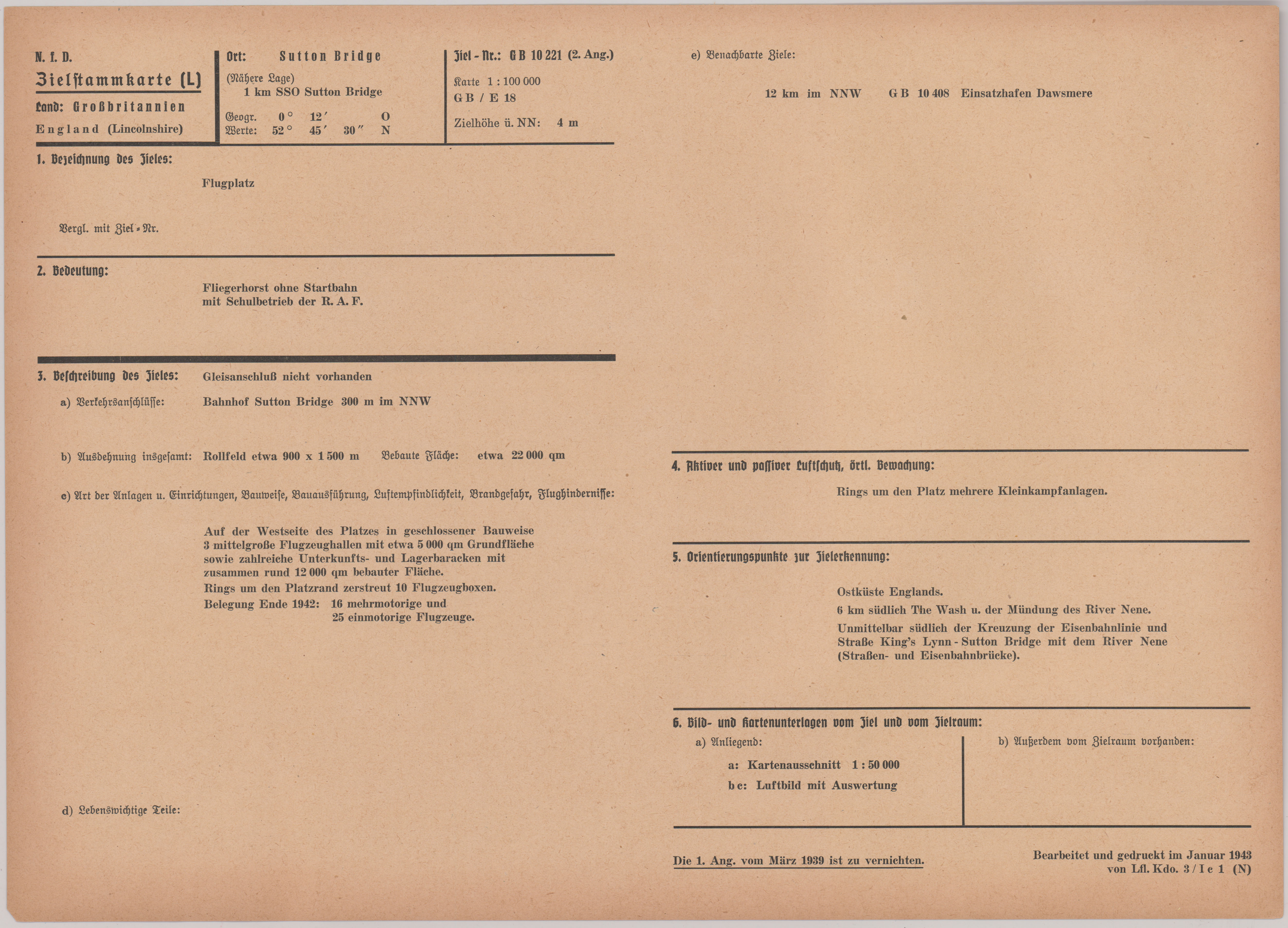
German Luftwaffe target intelligence dossier for RAF Sutton Bridge airfield, dated January 1943

The German Luftwaffe took its first aerial bombing assault on RAF Sutton Bridge on the night of 30–31 August 1940, where the Terrington decoy "Q" site would prove its effectiveness. On that night, four High Explosive (HE) bombs were dropped North-West of the detected "Q" site flare-path, with a further fifteen explosions minutes later. Another air raid, on 22 September 1940, saw a single German bomber drop a further seven bombs on the "Q" site. The Luftwaffe returned in strength on 14 February 1941, twelve bombers unloaded 47 High Explosive bombs and approximately 1,000 incendiary bombs, once again the decoy "Q" site proved its effectiveness, on the next night the Luftwaffe returned.

On 16 February 1941, amidst low cloud and afternoon drizzle, and without warning, a single Heinkel He 111 bomber appeared out of the grey sky, circuited RAF Sutton Bridge airfield, dropped nine bombs and sprayed the area with machine gun fire, before disappearing back into the cloud as quickly as it had appeared. One further air raid followed on the "Q" site when two bombers dropped eight High Explosive bombs shortly after midnight on 17–18 February 1941. No further direct air raid attacks materialized during the Blitz until the early hours of 12 May 1941 when Sutton Bridge was re-visited by the Luftwaffe, as part of a series of countrywide air raids targeting infrastructures and RAF airfields. Between the hours of 1-2 am on 12 May 1941, in addition to attacking the neighbouring town of Spalding, three bombers conducted a separate aerial bombing assault on RAF Sutton Bridge airfield, sixteen bombs fell in total on parked Hawker Hurricanes, setting two on fire and causing severe damage to seven others. On 24 July 1942 during a raid four bombs were dropped, one landing on the armoury. The Fighter Wing office and lecture rooms were destroyed, two hangars, a decontamination centre and the orderly room were damaged. An airman was critically injured.

== Central Gunnery School ==
The Central Gunnery School (CGS) was formed on 6 November 1939 after the RAF recognised the need for both continuing and advanced instruction, initially for air gunners in Bomber Command. Its first base was RAF Warmwell and the CGS ran its first course in April 1940, where the main focus was on turret-gunnery. On 1 April 1942 the CGS moved from RAF Chelveston near Northampton to RAF Sutton Bridge.

During the Battle of Britain, it became apparent that while aircrew had acquired essential flying skills, they had received little or no training in aerial gunnery. This was a serious deficiency for inexperienced pilots, meaning such training and the teaching of deflection shooting had largely to be carried out or just picked up during operations, resulting in fewer combat successes. For this reason, and after repeated approaches to senior officers by Wing Commander Adolph Malan widely known as ‘Sailor’ Malan, he finally received authority to set up a Fighter Wing at the CGS. He was a respected leader and high-scoring fighter pilot, whose Ten Rules For Air Fighting were already on many fighter squadron notice boards.

There was mutual advantage for the Bomber and Fighter wings to be based at the same location so that relevant gunnery flying exercises could be carried out together. Thus, the Central Gunnery School transferred to Sutton Bridge on 1 April 1942, with its new wider remit, and remained until February 1944. It comprised the Gunnery Leader (Bomber) Wing and the Pilot Gunnery Instructors Training Wing. Each training course lasted a month and comprised 10 fighter pilots and 32 air gunners; with a 50% overlap of courses there were always twice that number of airmen at the School.

Thus, its purpose was to give advanced training to experienced aircrew to become gunnery Instructors who were then posted to airfields around the country to use their newly acquired instructing skills. Fighter Command and Bomber Command worked together at the airfield. The two principal aircraft used were the Supermarine Spitfire and the Vickers Wellington respectively, although a large number of aircraft types were based at the airfield.

=== Pilot Gunnery Instructors Training Wing ===
Spitfire pilots with operational experience were given a month's training to become gunnery Instructors who would then be posted out to APCs (Armament Practice Camps) to teach freshly trained pilots deflection shooting.

Some of the training was undertaken using wing-mounted cine-cameras, simulating attacks with machine guns and cannons. In order to learn how to attack bombers and to learn dogfighting skills, the simulated attacks were made on both Wellingtons and on other Spitfires; for some purposes the School's target towing aircraft were sufficient as targets for these attacks. The gunnery film taken during simulated attacks was subsequently evaluated to assess proficiency.

Training using live ammunition was carried out on drogue targets (similar to a windsock), towed behind a target tug, most commonly Miles Masters or Westland Lysanders. Hawker Henleys were also used briefly at the School - see link for photograph of a drogue. The CGS operated its own Target Towing Flight. The ammunition of various Spitfires was painted in different colours, for example, blue green and red. Three Spitfires made attacks on one drogue, after which the target-towing aircraft dropped the drogue at a dropping zone near the airfield; it would then stream another drogue in readiness for another three pilots to make their attacks. By subsequent examination of the colour of the paint around the holes in the drogue, percentage hit rates of individual pilots could be assessed.

In 1943, the Air Ministry produced a 48-page training book for fighter pilots titled "Bag The Hun". This dealt with the estimation of range and angle off in deflection shooting, with the sub-title "Try This Series Of Exercises & Improve Your Shooting". This formed the basis of the training, and was issued to all instructors and pilots attending fighter gunnery courses. (For modern animation of a gunnery training class, see external links.)

A typical series of pilot's logbook entries for training flights during a course at the School would include:

Ranging and line of flight on Spitfire;
Range estimation on Wellington Bomber (Wimpy);
¼ attack on Wimpy;
Deflection practice on Spitfire 200mph;
Deflection 250mph;
Deflection 300mph;
¼ attack on Spitfire;
Half roll attack on Miles Master;
¼ attack and half roll from above on Wimpy;
Spitfire evading 200mph;
Spitfire evading 300mph;
¼ attack on Miles Master;
¼ attack on Miles Master with patter;
Varied attacks on Wimpy;
Astern shots at Spitfire;
Snap shots at Spitfire;
Attacking Wimpy taking full evasion.
(Wimpy = RAF aircrew nickname for Vickers Wellington bomber).

=== Gunnery Leader (Bomber) Wing ===
During the simulated attacks by Spitfires on Wellingtons, the bomber Gunnery Leaders were also trained using cine-film rather than live ammunition. Again, the film was subsequently evaluated to assess proficiency. After passing the course, trainees were posted to Operational Training Units around the country, where they became Instructors to train bomber gunnery crews.

=== Officers commanding Central Gunnery School 1942 to 1944 ===
Station Commanders RAF Sutton Bridge:

- 7 May 42 to 5 Sep 42 Gp. Capt. Claude Hilton Keith
- 5 Sep 42 to 26 Nov 43 Gp. Capt. Charles Eric St John Beamish
- 26 Nov 43 to 22 Feb 44 Gp. Capt. Michael Harington Dwyer

Officers Commanding Pilot Gunnery Instructor Training Wing, CGS:

- Mar 1942 to Sep 1942 Wg. Cdr. Adolph Malan
- Sep 1942 to Dec 1942 Wg. Cdr. Peter Russell 'Johnnie' Walker
- Dec 1942 to Jun 1943 Wg. Cdr. James Rankin
- Jun 1943 to Oct 1943 Wg. Cdr. Peter Russell 'Johnnie' Walker
- Oct 1943 to (Feb 1944) Wg. Cdr. Alan Christopher Deere

Officers Commanding Gunnery Leader (Bomber) Wing, CGS:

- Mar 1942 to Jun 1942 Wg. Cdr. John Mortimer Warfield
- Jun 1942 to Jun 1943 Wg. Cdr. J.J. Sutton
- Jun 1943 to Dec 1943 Wg. Cdr. Claydon
- Dec 1943 to (Feb 1944) Wg. Cdr. Arthur Ernest Lowe

Chief Instructors Fighter Wing, CGS:

- Mar 1942 to Sep 1942 Sqn. Ldr. Allan Richard Wright
- Oct 1942 to Feb 1943 Sqn. Ldr. Peter William Lefevre
- Feb 1943 to Jun 1943 Sqn. Ldr. Thomas Balmforth
- Jun 1943 to Sep 1943 Sqn, Ldr. Robert Dafforn (K)
- Sep 1943 to (Feb 1944) Sqn. Ldr. Archibald Winskill

The Central Gunnery School transferred to RAF Catfoss in March 1944.

== Closure and later use ==
In 1958, RAF Sutton Bridge was closed, and its land site sold to the Ministry of Agriculture. The former RAF station site continues to be utilised by the Potato Marketing Board as a leading UK agricultural experiment station (Sutton Bridge Crop Storage Research). Small remnants of RAF Sutton Bridge airfield still exist, including the recladded Hinaidi-type aircraft hangar, a repurposed Bellman-type aircraft hangar (located at 52°45′32.7″N 0°11′37.2″E), an RAF station radio mast, and two airfield perimeter pillboxes. The Hinaidi-type hangar (located at 52°45′36.57″N 0°11′38.75″E), was built during the airfield's expansion and maintenance works carried out throughout the 1930s by the 'En-Tout-Cas Co. (Syston) Ltd., (Aviation Dept.)' of Leicester, who were the Air Ministry contractors of Landing Grounds, Aerodrome Buildings and Gun Ranges. The Hinaidi-type aircraft hangar replaced two of the airfield's original four Bessonneau hangars during the 1930s. It is believed to be one of very few, if not the only one of this type, still existing in the UK. Additionally, the RAF station radio mast (located at 52°45′28.7″N 0°12′23.4″E) and two perimeter pillboxes (see Pillbox #1: 52°45′22.45″N 0°12′21.04″E, Pillbox #2: 52°45′41.31″N 0°12′25.52″E) still remain. The main gate entrance to the former RAF station site was on the west airfield side embankment (located at 52°45′36.1″N 0°11′26.5″E).

== See also ==
- Wartime Sutton Bridge
- UK Airfields : Sutton Bridge
