= Peter Lefevre =

British flying ace of WWII

- Born: 1918; Cambridge, United Kingdom
- Died: 6 February 1944 (aged 25); English Channel, near l'Aber-Vrac'h, France
- Military career
- Allegiance: United Kingdom
- Branch: Royal Air Force
- Rank: Squadron Leader
- Commands: No. 126 Squadron; No. 616 Squadron; No. 266 Squadron
- Conflicts: Second World War: Norwegian campaign; Battle of Britain; Siege of Malta
- Awards: Distinguished Flying Cross

Peter Lefevre DFC (1918 – 6 February 1944) was a flying ace of the Royal Air Force (RAF) during the Second World War. He is credited with the destruction of at least ten aircraft.

Born in Cambridge, Lefevre joined the RAF in 1938. At the time of the outbreak of the Second World War he was serving with No. 46 Squadron, and claimed his first aerial victory on 21 October 1939. He flew Hawker Hurricane fighters in the Norwegian campaign of late May–early June 1940, and was one of the few pilots of the squadron to return to the United Kingdom. After the squadron was rebuilt, he claimed more successes in the Battle of Britain. In May 1941 he was sent to Malta, where he became a flight commander with No. 126 Squadron and later its commander. Awarded the Distinguished Flying Cross in recognition of his service, he returned to the United Kingdom at the end of the year. He carried out instructing duties for over a year before returning to operations, first with No. 129 Squadron and then as commander of No. 616 Squadron. He was shot down over France in April 1943, but was able to evade capture and eventually made his way to England. In July he became commander of No. 266 and flew Hawker Typhoon fighters on sorties to France. He was killed on operations on 6 February 1944, while attacking a minesweeper off the Brittany coast.

== Early life ==
Peter William Lefevre was born in Cambridge in England, in 1918, the son of Frederick and Lilian Lefevre who were from Whitstable in Kent. His father was the mayor of Canterbury, where the Lefevre family lived. He was educated at Tonbridge School before going on to attend Pembroke College in Cambridge. In March 1938, he gained a short service commission in the Royal Air Force (RAF), commencing his initial training at No. 4 Elementary and Reserve Flying Training School at Brough. Two months later he proceeded to No. 6 Flying Training School at Netheravon and subsequently gained his wings.

Lefevre was posted to No. 46 Squadron as an acting pilot officer at the end of the year. The squadron was based at Digby, where it was operating Gloster Gauntlet biplane fighters. In March 1939, it began to switch to the monoplane Hawker Hurricane fighter.

== Second World War ==
At the time of the outbreak of the Second World War, Lefevre was still serving with No. 46 Squadron and was confirmed in his pilot officer rank a few days later. For the first few months of the war, the squadron patrolled the east coast and its first engagement with the Luftwaffe took place on 21 October when it intercepted some Heinkel He 115 floatplanes off the northeast coast, near Spurn Head. Lefevre shared in the shooting down of one of the three He 115s destroyed in this engagement.

=== Norwegian campaign ===
In May 1940, No. 46 Squadron transferred its Hurricanes to the HMS Glorious and left the United Kingdom, destined for Norway. Towards the end of the month it began operating over Narvik as part of the British effort to secure that port from the Germans. On 7 June, Lefevre shared in the destruction of a Heinkel He 111 medium bomber about 12 miles (19 km) to the south of Bardufoss. While much of the squadron's flying personnel flew their surviving Hurricanes back to Glorious later that evening of 7 June, the rest, including Lefevre, later traveled to the United Kingdom on the Blue Star liner SS Arandora Star. The Glorious was sunk by the German battleships Scharnhorst and Gneisenau on 8 June, with all but of two of the squadron's pilots aboard being killed. This left Lefevre as one of its few remaining pilots.

=== Battle of Britain ===
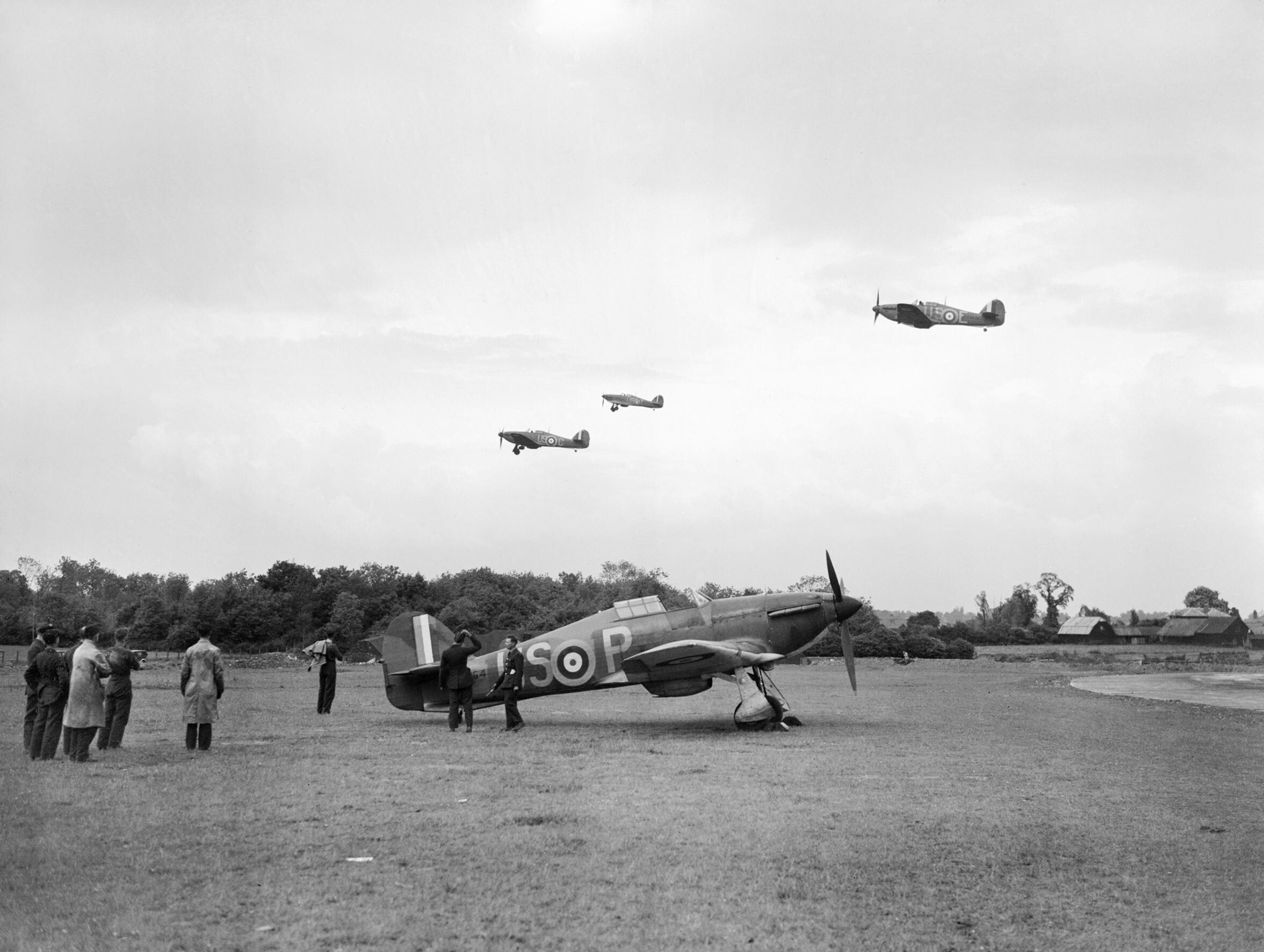
Hawker Hurricane fighters at North Weald, from where No. 46 Squadron operated during the Battle of Britain

No. 46 Squadron was rebuilt at Digby and resumed operations on 25 June with patrolling duties. At the start of September, it moved to North Weald as a reinforcement for No. 11 Group, which was heavily engaged in the Battle of Britain. On 3 September, Lefevre destroyed a Junkers Ju 88 medium bomber to the northwest of Southend, although there is a possibility that this may have been a misidentified RAF Bristol Blenheim light bomber. This was followed on 8 September by his share in the probable destruction of a Dornier Do 17 medium bomber over the Isle of Sheppey. By this time he held the rank of flying officer, having been promoted earlier this month. He survived being shot down on 18 September, bailing out of his Hurricane despite being slightly wounded. He shared in the shooting down of another Do 17 on 3 November near Gravesend.

=== Siege of Malta ===
In May, No. 46 Squadron began preparing for a move to the Mediterranean and were embarked together with Hurricanes aboard the aircraft carrier HMS Argus. However, on arrival at Gibraltar, the pilots were transferred to HMS Ark Royal which was transporting Hurricanes to Malta; the island was under an aerial siege mounted by the Regia Aeronautica (Royal Italian Air Force). On 29 May, the pilots, including Lefevre, flew the Hurricanes off Ark Royal's flight deck to Malta. On arrival there, the pilots and aircraft were the basis for No. 126 Squadron, with Lefevre as one of its flight commanders. His first claims over Malta was for one Macchi C.200 fighter shot down and a second damaged on 12 June.

The squadron soon started to carry out offensive operations to Sicily as well as its defensive duties and on 27 July Lefevre shot up and damaged an Italian motor torpedo boat. He destroyed a MC.200 off the Sicilian coast on 19 August and then, having been recently promoted to flight lieutenant, shot down another of the same type on 4 September, this time over Grand Harbour. In October he took command of another Malta-based unit, No. 185 Squadron, for a week after its leader had been lost. On his return to No. 126 Squadron, he was promoted to acting squadron leader and appointed its commanding officer.

On 12 December, Lefevre's award of the Distinguished Flying Cross was announced. The citation, published in The London Gazette, read:

This officer has shown the utmost devotion to duty over a long period of operational flying, in which he has destroyed several enemy aircraft. He carried out over 250 hours flying on convoy patrols over the North Sea as well as participating in other operational missions. Squadron Leader Lefevre has participated in operations in the Middle East, and in July, 1941, he attacked an Italian E boat which was forced to surrender.

— London Gazette, No. 35378, 12 December 1941

=== Return to Europe ===
Lefevre was repatriated back to the United Kingdom at the end of the year. For the next several months he served in an instructing capacity at No. 52 Operational Training Unit at Aston Down before becoming the chief flying instructor at the Central Gunnery School at Sutton Bridge for a time. He returned to operations in February 1943 with a posting as a flight commander with No. 129 Squadron. This was based at Ibsley and operated the Supermarine Spitfire fighter on escort duties and offensive operations to France.

In early April Lefevre was appointed commander of another unit at Ibsley, No. 616 Squadron. Although also equipped with Spitfires, this was a high-altitude variant with pressurised cockpits. On 16 April Lefevre was shot down by anti-aircraft fire while on a sortie escorting Lockheed Ventura medium bombers targeting Brest. He parachuted out of his stricken aircraft, and landed at Plouguin. He made contact with the French resistance which sheltered him for several weeks, and was eventually guided across the border into Spain where he linked up with the British ambassador. He made his way to Gibraltar from where he was repatriated to the United Kingdom on 13 July. He returned No. 616 Squadron the following month but after a few days was posted away to command of No. 266 Squadron.

This was equipped with the Hawker Typhoon fighter and, stationed at Exeter, was mainly engaged in bomber escort duties. Later in the year it began operating in a fighter-bomber role. Lefevre shared in the shooting down of a Ju 88 near Point Penmarc'h on 1 December. He destroyed a Bf 109 over Lannion Airfield on 21 January 1944 and two days combined with three other pilots to destroy a Focke Wulf 190 fighter near Gaël. On 6 February his squadron carried out an attack on an anti-aircraft installation at l'Aber-Vrac'h on the coast of Brittany. Lefevre spotted a minesweeper and opted to strafe it but his Typhoon was hit by flak. He bailed out but was too low for his parachute to fully open by the time he landed in the sea. His body was never recovered and he is presumed to have died, aged 25.

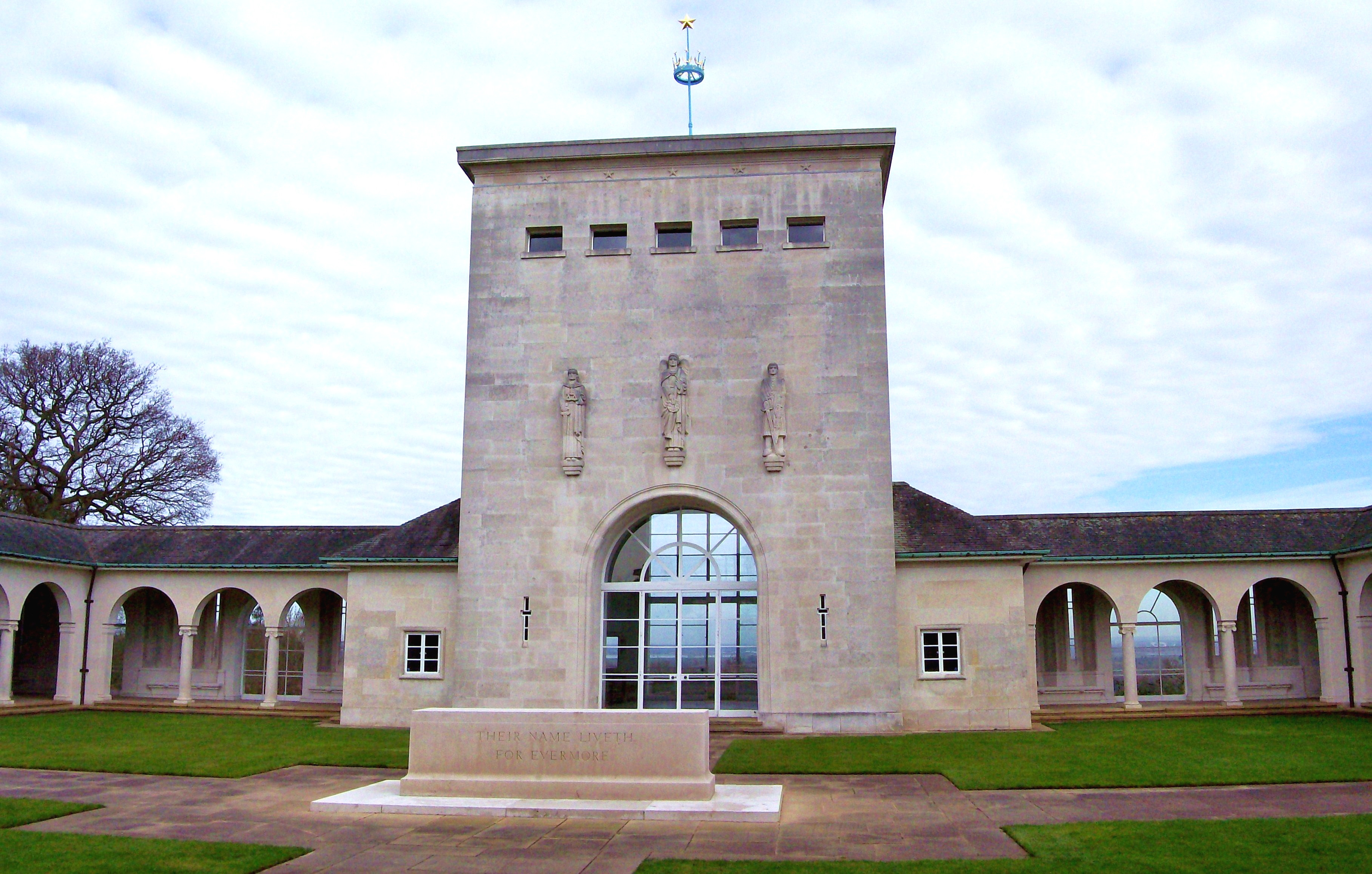
Lefevre is commemorated on the Runneymeade Memorial at Englefield Green

With no known grave, Lefevre is commemorated on the Runneymeade Memorial at Englefield Green. He is credited with the shooting down of ten aircraft, five of which were shared with other pilots, as well as a share in one aircraft that was probably destroyed. He also damaged one aircraft.
