= Arthur Jacob Nature Reserve =

Local nature reserve located in Horton

Coordinates: 51.472°N 0.530°W

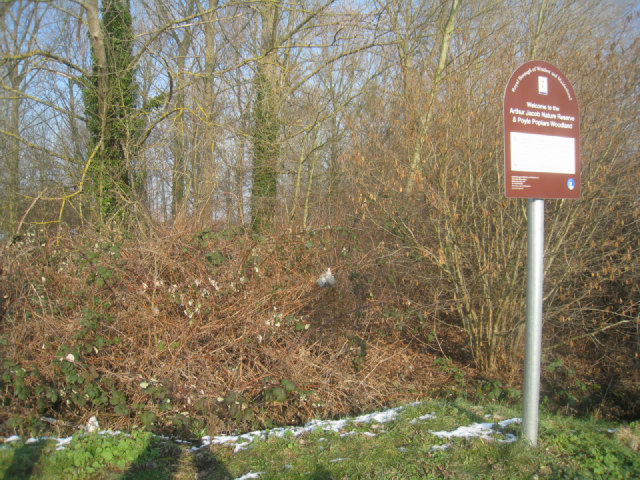
- Interactive map of Arthur Jacob Nature Reserve
- Type: Local Nature Reserve
- Location: Horton, Berkshire
- OS grid: TQ 022 758
- Area: 4.1 hectares (10 acres)
- Manager: Royal Borough of Windsor and Maidenhead

Arthur Jacob Nature Reserve is a 4.1-hectare (10-acre) Local Nature Reserve in Horton in Berkshire. It is owned and managed by the Royal Borough of Windsor and Maidenhead.

The reserve has four former gravel pits which have been converted from derelict land into lagoons managed for wildlife. There are several islands and the site has been planted with trees and shrubs, while some areas have been turned into wildflower meadows.
