= No. 616 Squadron RAuxAF =

No. 616 (South Yorkshire) Squadron RAuxAF
- Squadron badge
- Active: 1 November 1938 – 29 August 1945; 10 May 1946 – 10 March 1957; 1 April 2019 – present
- Country: United Kingdom
- Branch: Royal Air Force
- Type: Reserve Sqn
- Role: ISTAR
- Part of: Royal Auxiliary Air Force
- Garrison/HQ: RAF Waddington
- Nickname: South Yorkshire
- Mottos: Latin: Nulla Rosa Sine Spina (Translation: "No rose without a thorn")
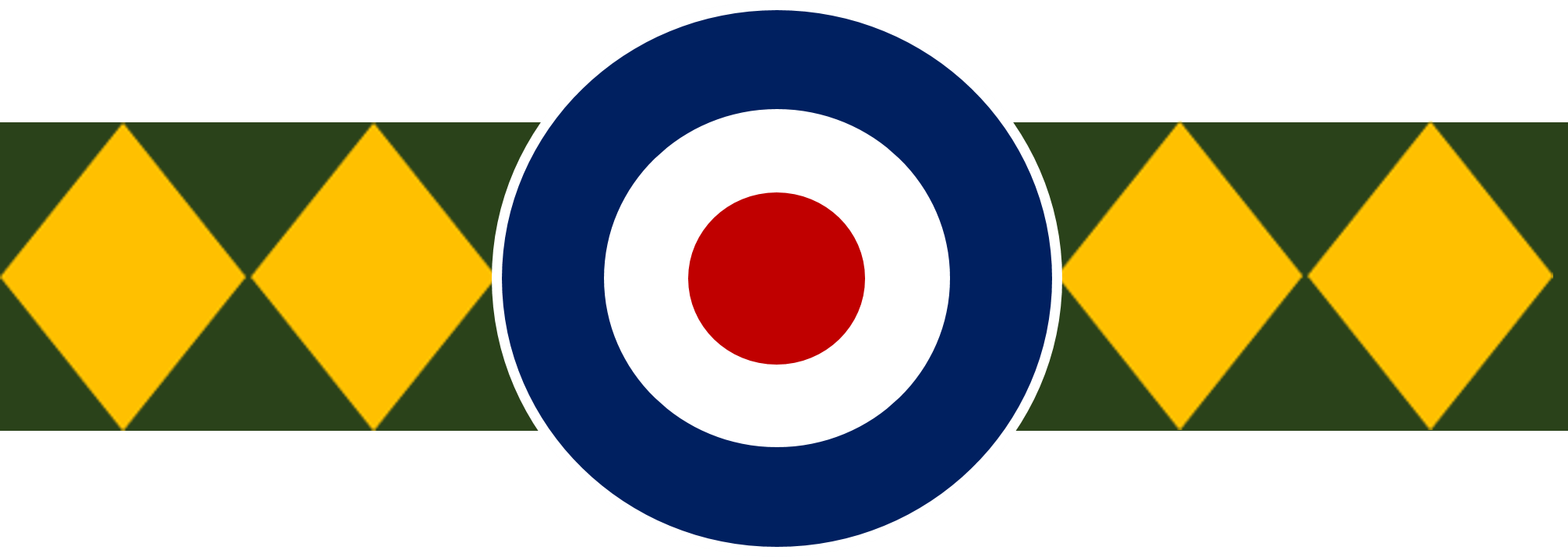
- post 1951 aircraft insignia

Commanders
- Honorary Air Commodore: The Duke of Portland
- Notable commanders: Colin Falkland Gray, Percy "Laddy" Lucas

Insignia
- Squadron Badge heraldry: A white Yorkshire rose, superimposed on an arrow The badge commemorates the squadron's association with Yorkshire as the South Yorkshire Auxiliary Squadron
- Squadron Codes: QJ (April 1939 – July 1941); YQ (July 1941 – August 1945, 1949 – April 1951); RAW (July 1946 – 1949)

No. 616 (South Yorkshire) Squadron is an active Reserve unit of the Royal Auxiliary Air Force (RAuxAF) assigned to the RAF ISTAR Force at RAF Waddington. It was originally formed as a unit of the British Auxiliary Air Force in 1938, active throughout World War 2 as a fighter unit, becoming the 1st operational RAF unit to fly jets and disbanded in 1957. The unit reformed in its current guise in April 2019 as 616 (South Yorkshire) Squadron Royal Auxiliary Air Force.

== History and Operations ==
=== Formation ===
No. 616 Squadron was formed on 1 November 1938 at RAF Doncaster and was at first allotted the bomber role, receiving Hawker Hinds for that role. The role soon changed however and the squadron's first operational fighter aircraft were Gloster Gauntlet biplane fighters received in January 1939. Fairey Battle monoplane light bombers were delivered in May 1939 for training duties to assist the squadron in preparing for re-equipment with Supermarine Spitfire Mk.Is in October 1939. During that month No. 616 moved to RAF Leconfield and by the end of November conversion to the modern fighter was complete.

The squadron's first operational sorties were over the Dunkirk withdrawal in late May 1940. During the first phase of the Battle of Britain No. 616 was based at Leconfield, moving south to RAF Kenley on 19 August to be nearer the front line. The improved Spitfire Mk.II was received in February 1941 and was used from April on sweeps over occupied France from RAF Tangmere, continuing until October. Further periodic updating with Spitfire Mks.V, VI and VII continued through the mid-war years. From March 1943 onwards, No. 616 was stationed in southwest England.

=== First on Meteors ===
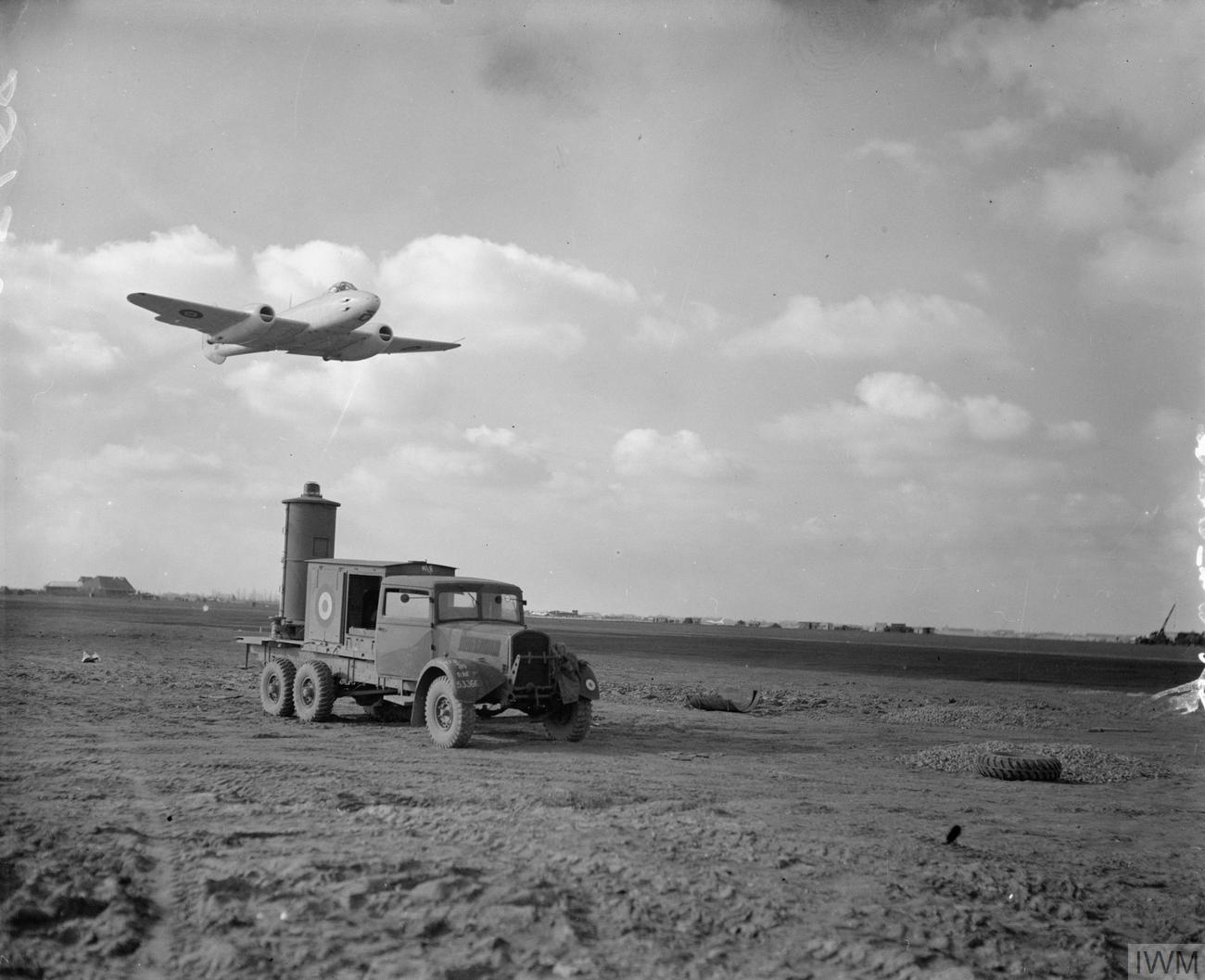
616 Squadron Meteor F Mark III takes off from B58/Melsbroek, Belgium, 1945

On 12 July 1944 the unit became the first RAF squadron to receive jet equipment in the form of Gloster Meteor Mk.I fighters, testing them at RAF Culmhead. The first Meteor operational sortie was on 27 July from RAF Manston when it intercepted V-1 flying bombs launched against southern England. The first victories came on 4 August when one V1 was tipped over after a pilot's cannon jammed and another was shot down. The loss rate of the still unproven Meteor Mk.I was high, with three being written off in non-combat incidents between 15 and 29 August. Re-equipment with improved Meteor Mk.IIIs began in January 1945 and in February a detachment was deployed to Melsbroek near Brussels in Belgium. It was intended as a defence against Me 262s but in the event they did not ever face them. In early April the complete squadron moved to Gilze-Rijen in the Netherlands, commencing ground attack sorties on 16 April. The squadron was disbanded at Lübeck, Germany on 29 August 1945 by being renumbered to No. 263 Squadron RAF.

=== Post-war ===
No. 616 squadron was officially reformed at RAF Finningley as the South Yorkshire Squadron on 10 May 1946, with volunteers being recruited over the following few months till embodied on 11 July 1946. It was allocated the night fighter role within Reserve Command and the first Mosquito T.3 trainers were received in October, but it was not until January 1948 that the operational Mosquito NF.30s were delivered to Finningley.

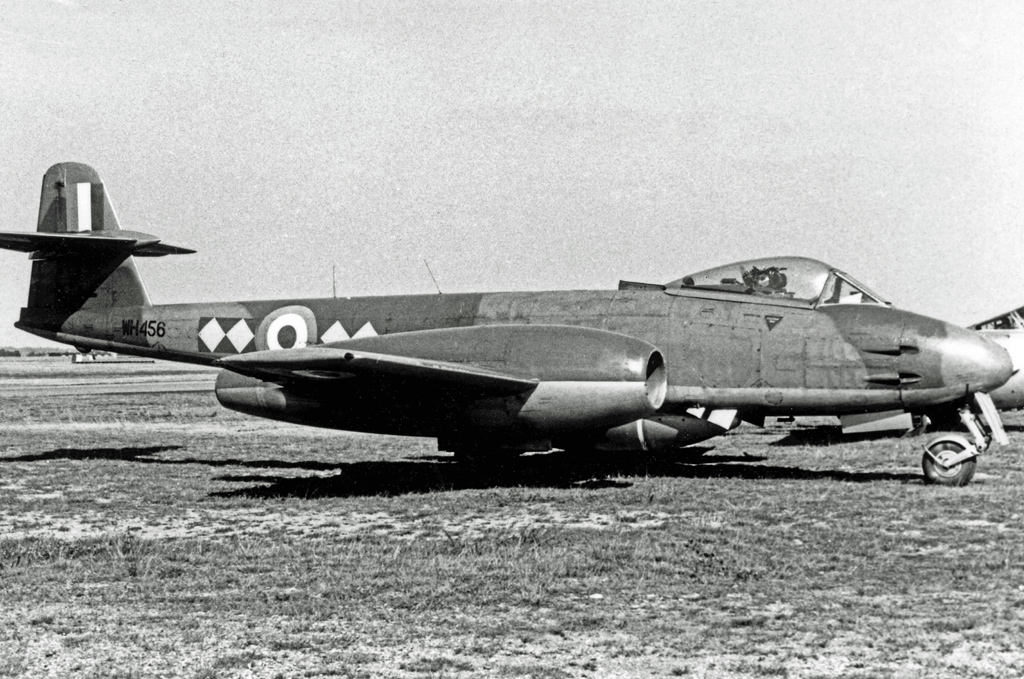
Gloster Meteor F.8 of 616 Squadron in 1955 wearing the distinctive unit markings.

At the end of 1948 No. 616 was redesignated as a day fighter squadron and began to receive Meteor F.3s in January 1949. Conversion to the updated Meteor F.8 took place in December 1951, which wore the distinctive Green and Gold Diamond markings of 616 Sqn on the rear fuselage. The squadron moved base to RAF Worksop on 23 May 1955, where it either disbanded on 10 March 1957 (per Halley and Jefford or Pitchfork), together with all RAuxAF flying units, or disbanded on 15 January 1957 according to Rawlings in Fighter Squadrons of the Royal Air Force, at RAF Finningley.

=== Re-activation and current role ===
In April 2019, the unit reformed as 616 (South Yorkshire) Squadron Royal Auxiliary Air Force (RAuxAF) at RAF Waddington to augment the RAF’s Intelligence, Surveillance, Target Acquisition and Reconnaissance (ISTAR) Force and delivering a Combat Air capability. Personnel assigned to 616 Sqn are former Regular RAF specialists, providing expertise, experience and mentoring to augment the RAF's Front Line ISTAR Squadrons.

== Aircraft operated ==
Aircraft operated by no. 616 Squadron RAF, data from
From	To	Aircraft	Version	Remarks
Nov 1938	Jan 1939	Hawker Hind		Used for training
Jan 1939	Dec 1939	Gloster Gauntlet	Mk.II	
May 1939	Nov 1939	Fairey Battle		Used for training
Oct 1939	Feb 1941	Supermarine Spitfire	Mk.I	
Feb 1941	Jul 1941	Supermarine Spitfire	Mk.IIa	
Jul 1941	Jun 1942	Supermarine Spitfire	Mk.Vb	
Oct 1941	Nov 1941	Supermarine Spitfire	Mk.IIb	
Apr 1942	Nov 1943	Supermarine Spitfire	Mk.VI	
Sep 1943	Aug 1944	Supermarine Spitfire	Mk.VII	
Jul 1944	Jan 1945	Gloster Meteor	Mk.I	
Jan 1945	Aug 1945	Gloster Meteor	Mk.III	
Sep 1947	May 1949	de Havilland Mosquito	NF.30	
Jan 1949	May 1957	Gloster Meteor	F.3	
Apr 1951	Dec 1951	Gloster Meteor	F.4	
Dec 1951	Feb 1957	Gloster Meteor	F.8	
Apr 2019	Oct 2021	Sentry	AEW.1	
Apr 2019	Mar 2021	Sentinel	R.1	
Apr 2019	Sep 2025	MQ-9A Reaper		Foreign Military Sale
Apr 2019	Date	Shadow	R.1 & R.2	Due to be withdrawn from Service following DIP
Apr 2019	Date	RC-135W Rivet Joint		Foreign Military Sale
Aug 2019	Date	Protector	RG.1	UK version of MQ-9B SkyGuardian

== Squadron bases ==
Bases and airfields used by no. 616 Squadron RAF, data from
From	To	Base	Remark
1 November 1938	23 October 1939	RAF Doncaster	Formed here
23 October 1939	23 February 1940	RAF Leconfield	
23 February 1940	9 March 1940	RAF Catfoss	Detached due to thaw at Leconfield
9 March 1940	27 May 1940	RAF Leconfield	
27 May 1940	6 June 1940	RAF Rochford	Detached for air cover during Dunkirk evacuation
6 June 1940	19 August 1940	RAF Leconfield	
19 August 1940	3 September 1940	RAF Kenley	
3 September 1940	9 September 1940	RAF Coltishall	
9 September 1940	26 February 1941	RAF Kirton-in-Lindsey	
26 February 1941	9 May 1941	RAF Tangmere	
9 May 1941	6 October 1941	RAF Westhampnett	
6 October 1941	30 January 1942	RAF Kirton-in-Lindsey	
30 January 1942	3 July 1942	RAF Kings Cliffe	
3 July 1942	8 July 1942	RAF West Malling	
8 July 1942	29 July 1942	RAF Kenley	
29 July 1942	14 August 1942	RAF Great Sampford	
14 August 1942	20 August 1942	RAF Hawkinge	Detached for Dieppe Raid
20 August 1942	1 September 1942	RAF Great Sampford	
1 September 1942	7 September 1942	RAF Ipswich	Det.
7 September 1942	23 September 1942	RAF Great Sampford	
23 September 1942	29 October 1942	RAF Tangmere	
29 October 1942	2 January 1943	RAF Westhampnett	
2 January 1943	15 March 1943	RAF Ibsley	
15 March 1943	18 March 1943	RAF Harrowbeer	Det.
18 March 1943	17 September 1943	RAF Ibsley	
17 September 1943	16 November 1943	RAF Exeter	
16 November 1943	1 December 1943	RAF Fairwood Common	Detached for armament practice camp
1 December 1943	18 March 1944	RAF Exeter	
18 March 1944	24 April 1944	RAF West Malling	
24 April 1944	16 May 1944	RAF Fairwood Common	
16 May 1944	21 July 1944	RAF Culmhead	
21 July 1944	17 January 1945	RAF Manston	
17 January 1945	28 February 1945	RAF Colerne	
4 February 1945	26 March 1945	B.58 Melsbroek, Belgium	Detachment flying all-white Meteors
28 February 1945	1 April 1945	RAF Andrews Field	
1 April 1945	13 April 1945	B.77/Gilze-Rijen, Netherlands	
13 April 1945	20 April 1945	B.91/Nijmegen, Netherlands	
20 April 1945	26 April 1945	B.109/Quakenbrück, Germany	
26 April 1945	3 May 1945	B.152/Fassberg, Germany	
3 May 1945	7 May 1945	B.156/Luneberg, Germany	
7 May 1945	29 August 1945	B.158/Lübeck, Germany	Disbanded here
10 May 1946	15 June 1951	RAF Finningley	Reformed here
15 June 1951	11 July 1951	RAF Church Fenton	Call-up training during Korean crisis
11 July 1951	23 May 1955	RAF Finningley	
23 May 1955	10 March 1957	RAF Worksop	Disbanded here
1 April 2019	Present	RAF Waddington	Reformed here

== Commanding officers ==
Officers commanding no. 616 Squadron RAF, data from
From	To	Name
November 1938	September 1939	S/Ldr the Earl of Lincoln
September 1939	May 1940	S/Ldr W.K. Beisiegel
May 1940	September 1940	S/Ldr M. Robinson
September 1940	September 1941	S/Ldr H.F. Burton, DFC
September 1941	February 1942	S/Ldr C.F. Gray, DFC & Bar
February 1942	January 1943	S/Ldr H.L.I. Brown DFC
January 1943	April 1943	S/Ldr G.S.K. Haywood
April 1943	April 1943	S/Ldr P.W. Lefevre DFC
April 1943	July 1943	S/Ldr P.B. Lucas DFC
July 1943	July 1944	S/Ldr L.W. Watts DFC
July 1944	May 1945	W/Cdr A. McDowall DFM & Bar
May 1945	August 1945	W/Cdr W.E. Schrader DFC
July 1946	December 1950	S/Ldr K. Holden DFC
December 1950	November 1954	S/Ldr L.H. Casson DFC
November 1954	March 1957	S/Ldr W.G. Abel
April 2019	Present	Sqn Ldr Stephen (Bertie) Lewis Beddoes

== Notable Members of 616 Squadron ==
- Air Vice Marshal James Edgar 'Johnnie' Johnson CB CBE DSO & Two Bars DFC & Bar
- Group Captain Sir Hugh Dundas CBE DSO & Bar DFC
- Group Captain Denys Gillam DSO & Two Bars DFC & Bar AFC
- Group Captain Sir Douglas Bader CBE DSO & Bar DFC & Bar DL FRAeS

== See also ==
- List of Royal Air Force aircraft squadrons
