= Horton, Berkshire =

Coordinates: 51.473°N 0.543°W

Horton
- Village and civil parish
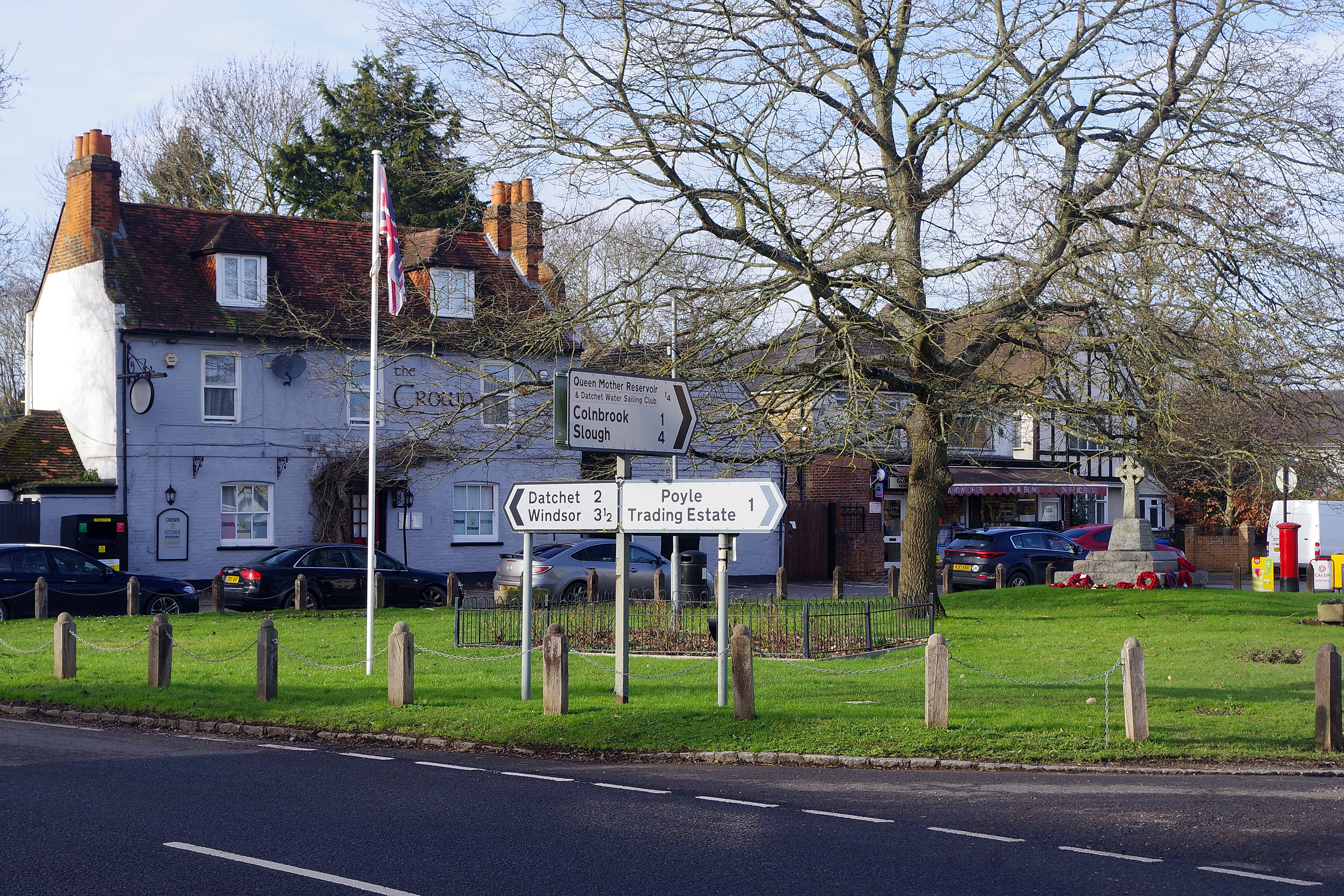
- The Green, Horton

- Location within Berkshire
- Population: 983; 2001 United Kingdom census 1,033 (2011 Census)
- OS grid reference: TQ0175
- Civil parish: Horton
- Unitary authority: Windsor and Maidenhead
- Ceremonial county: Berkshire
- Region: South East
- Country: England
- Sovereign state: United Kingdom
- Post town: Slough
- Postcode district: SL3
- Dialling code: 01753
- Police: Thames Valley
- Fire: Royal Berkshire
- Ambulance: South Central
- UK Parliament: Windsor

Horton is a village and civil parish in Berkshire, England. It is between Windsor and Staines-upon-Thames.

== History and etymology ==
The village name is a common one in England. It is Old English in origin and derives from the two words horu 'dirt' and tūn 'settlement, farm, estate', presumably meaning 'farm on muddy soil'. In the Domesday Book of 1086 it was recorded as Hortune. The Horton Manor was assessed at 10 hides and held by Walter son of Other.

== Geography ==
Through the Horton parish flows the Colne Brook which runs to the River Thames from the River Colne. Wraysbury railway station is nearest to its southern end, and Sunnymeads railway station is nearest to its western end. Heathrow Airport is to its east, separated from Horton by the M25 motorway. Horton has a local nature reserve, the Arthur Jacob Nature Reserve.

== Parish church ==
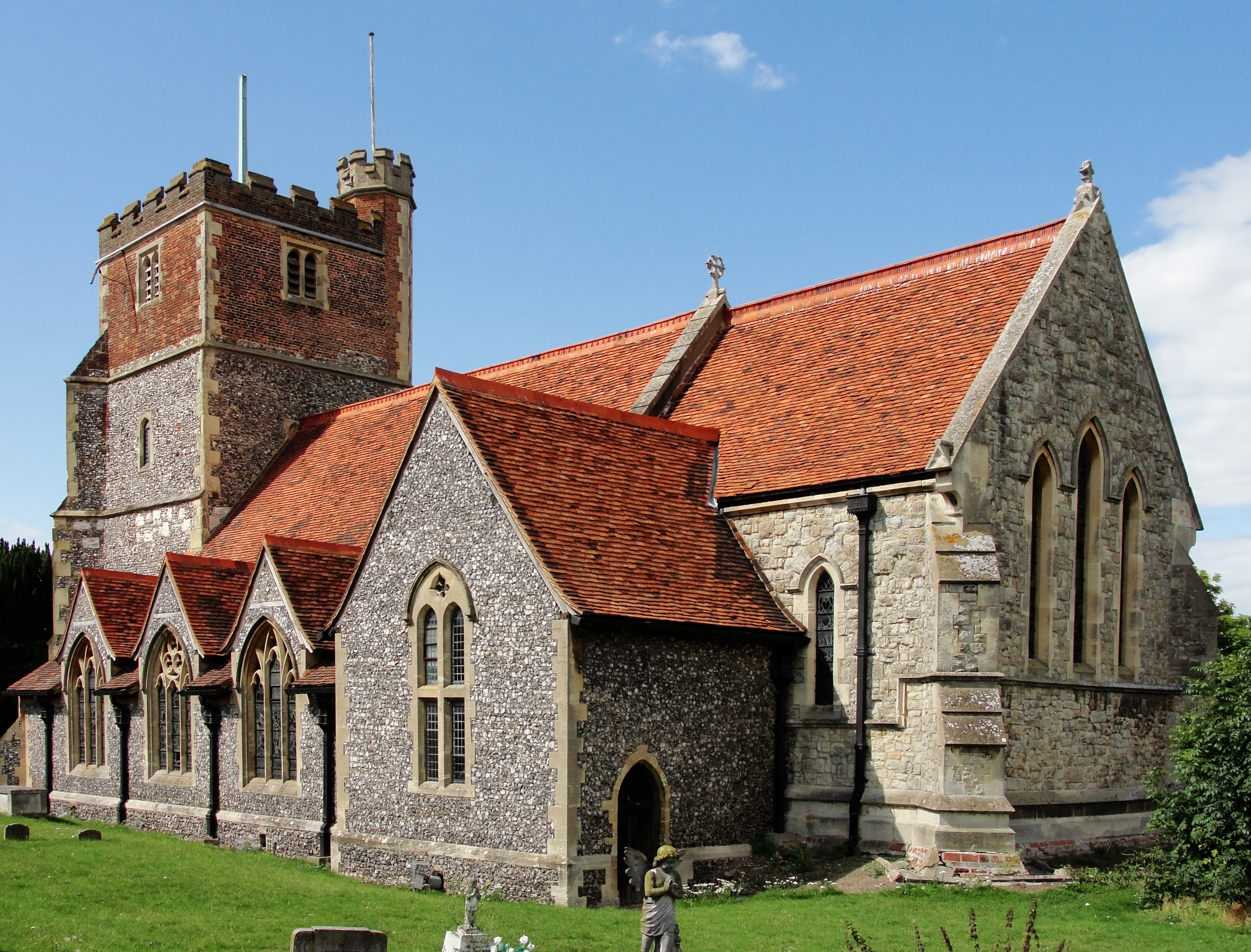
St Michael and All Angels parish church

The Church of England parish church of St Michael has a 12th-century nave, with an ornate Norman arch over the north door in the porch. The north transept is 15th century and the square bell-tower is late 16th century. The aisle, chancel and vestry were rebuilt in 1875–76. The exterior of the church is chequered with brickwork, limestone and flint. The tower is square and between 70 and 80 feet (21 and 24 m) high. It has a clock, and the ring of bells was augmented from five to six in 1987. The church is a Grade I listed building.

== Governance ==
Horton was transferred from Buckinghamshire to Berkshire in 1974. At parish level the village is represented by nine councillors of the Horton Parish Council. At borough level the town is part of the Datchet Horton and Wraysbury electoral ward and is currently represented by three independent councillors, David Buckley, Ewan Larcombe and Jodie Grove, in the Royal Borough of Windsor and Maidenhead. Nationally, since 1997, the ward has formed part of the UK Parliamentary constituency of Windsor, which has been represented since 2024 by Jack Rankin of the Conservative Party. Before 1997 the town was part of the UK Parliamentary constituency of Windsor and Maidenhead which was consistently held by the Conservative Party.

== Notable residents ==
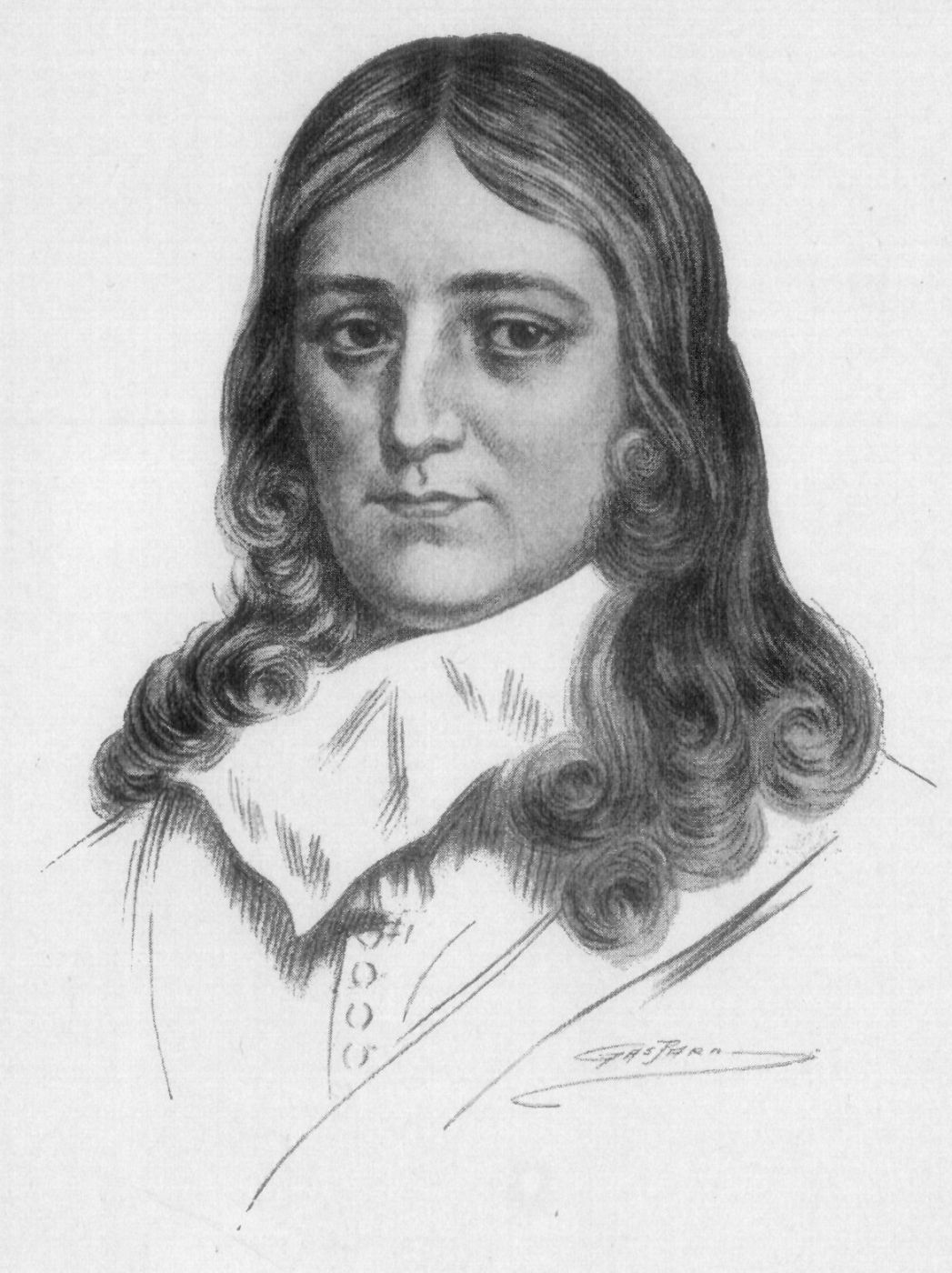
John Milton (1608–74) wrote many of his poems, including Il Penseroso and L'Allegro, while living at Horton

John Milton the English poet is one of the more famous former residents of Horton. His family rented Berkyn Manor, a house that belonged to Sir John Egerton, in the parish between 1632 and 1640. The chancel of St Michael's parish church contains the grave of Milton's mother Sara; and a 19th-century stained glass window on the church commemorates Milton's poem Paradise Lost. The current Berkyn Manor was rebuilt in 1848 by Edward Tyrrell (Remembrancer of the City of London) reputedly on the site of Milton's house.

== Gallery ==
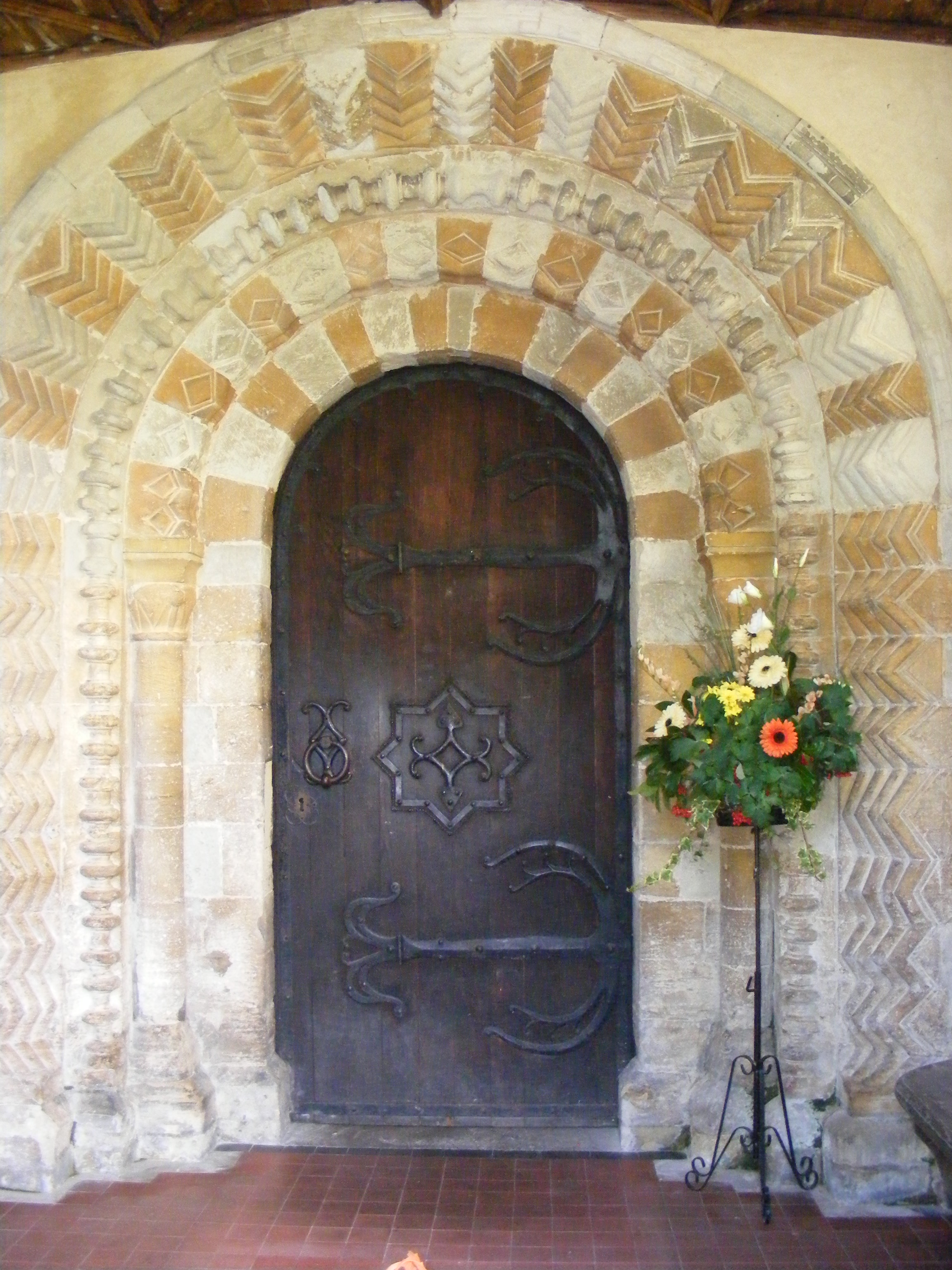
Norman north door of St Michael's parish church

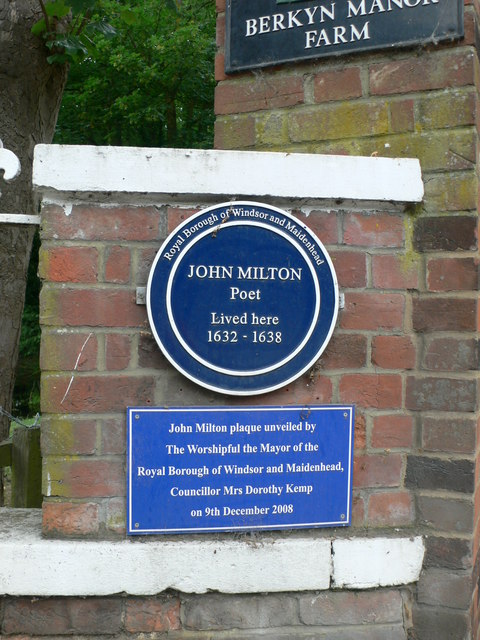
John Milton blue plaque at the entrance to Berkyn Manor

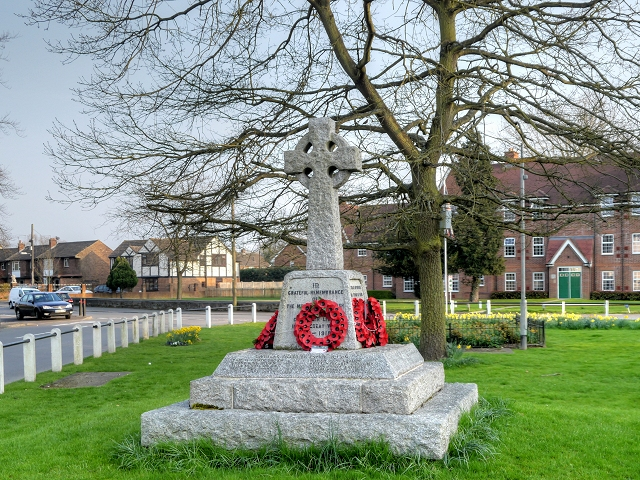
Horton War Memorial

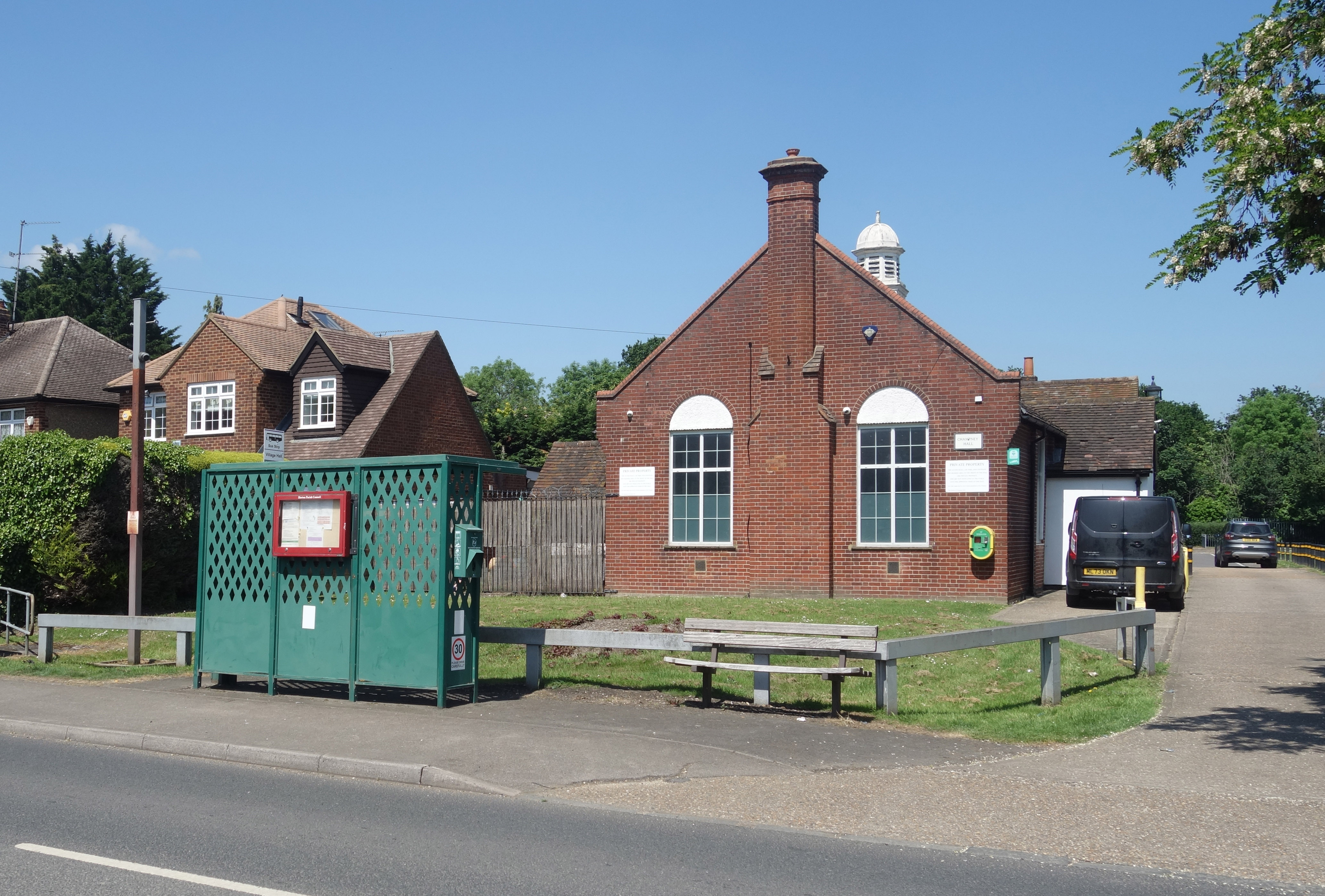
Champney Hall
