= RAF Errol =

Former Royal Air Force station in Perth and Kinross, Scotland

RAF Errol
- Errol, Perth and Kinross in Scotland
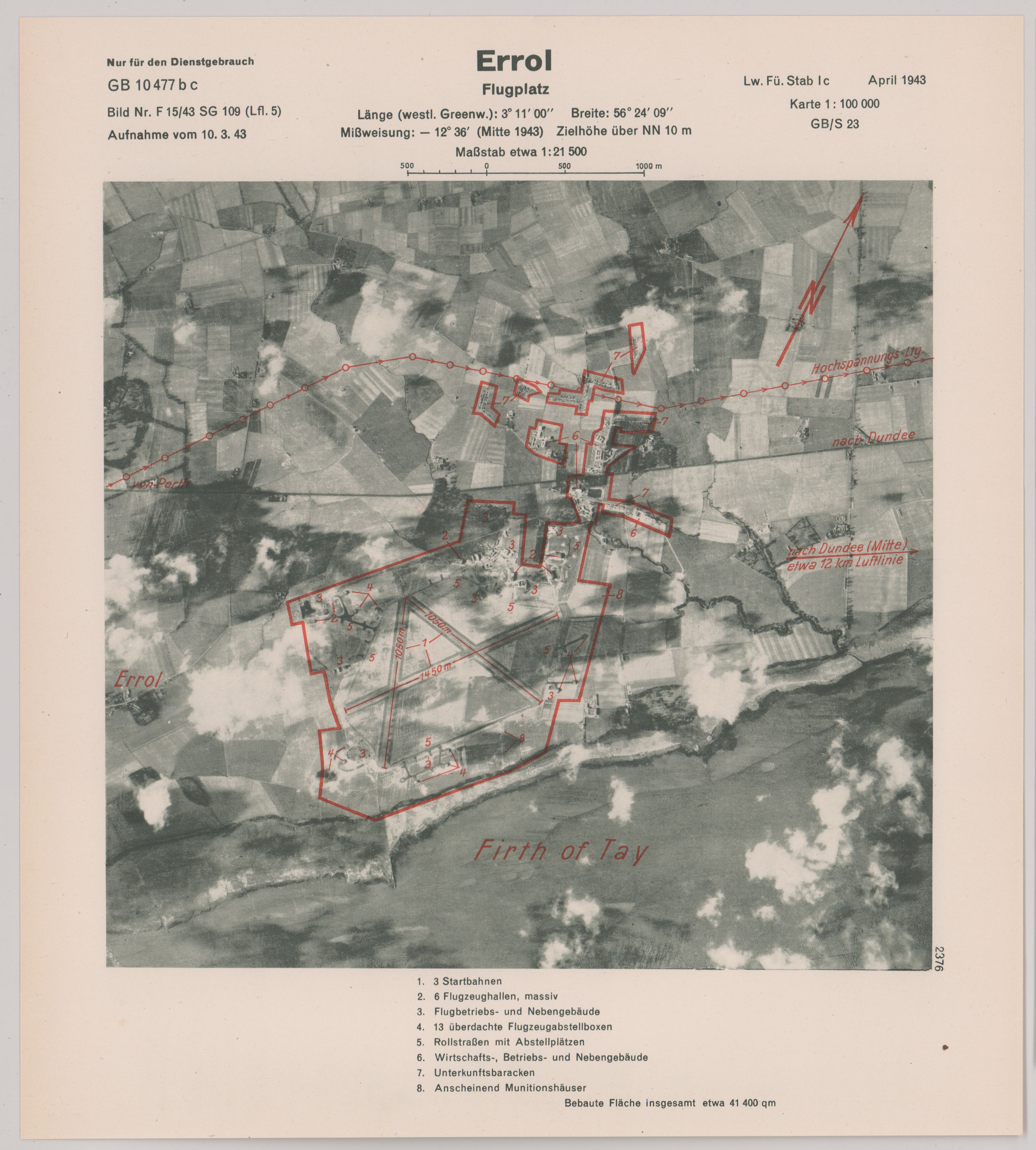
- RAF Errol on a target dossier of the German Luftwaffe, 1943

Site information
- Type: Royal Air Force station
- Owner: Air Ministry
- Operator: Royal Air Force
- Controlled by: RAF Flying Training Command

Location
- Shown within RAF Errol (the United Kingdom)
- Coordinates: 56°24′20″N 003°10′48″W

Site history
- Built: 1941/42
- In use: August 1942 -1948
- Battles/wars: European theatre of World War II

Airfield information
- Elevation: 5 metres (16 ft) AMSL
Runways
Direction	Length and surface
00/00	1,388 metres (4,554 ft) Tarmac
00/00	1,046 metres (3,432 ft) Tarmac
00/00	1,035 metres (3,396 ft) Tarmac

Royal Air Force Errol or more simply RAF Errol is a former Royal Air Force station located near the village of Errol in Perth & Kinross, Scotland, on the north bank of the Firth of Tay approximately halfway between Perth and Dundee.

== History ==
The airfield opened in January 1943. Errol housed No. 305 Ferry Training Unit RAF as a special air training conversion unit for the Soviet crews receiving deliveries of Armstrong Whitworth Albemarles. This joint operation continued until April 1944, despite cancellation of Albemarle deliveries in September, 1943. The RAF station originally featured a control tower, 6 hangars, and three runways arranged in an 'A' shape which are still visible today from the air. The military role of Errol airfield ended in 1948, shortly after the end of World War II.

== Units ==
The following units were here at some point:

- No. 9 Gliding School RAF (May – November 1945)
- No. 9 (Pilots) Advanced Flying Unit RAF (August 1942 – June 1945)
- No. 260 Maintenance Unit RAF (June 1945 – July 1948)
- No. 271 Squadron RAF
- 810 Naval Air Squadron
- No. 1544 (Beam Approach Training) Flight RAF (January – March 1944)
- No. 1680 (Transport) Flight RAF (April – May & September 1944)

== Post war ==
In 1988, the eastern section of the airfield was purchased by Morris Leslie Group as a site for auctioning plant. The site serves as their headquarters, and they created a mixed-use business park on the Errol side of the airfield. As of 2007 a haulage company and a garden supplies wholesaler are in residence.

Vintage car rallies and other events requiring large flat open spaces take place at the airfield throughout the year. A weekly car boot sale is held every Sunday, which, in the summer months, is one of the largest in Scotland.

The western and core section of Errol Airfield is owned WL&JA Doe, a farming partnership at Muirhouses Farm, which has belonged to the Doe Family since 1911. Muirhouses Farm includes the majority and heart of Errol Airfield including the main runways, control tower, hangars, workshops, huts, gunner posts and air raid shelters.

Many of the buildings around the airfield are now derelict or in a state of poor repair. Only one runway appears to be in service for light aircraft for activities such as skydiving.
