= List of RAF aircrew in the Battle of Britain (O–R) =

The following is a list of pilots and other aircrew who flew during the Battle of Britain, and were awarded the Battle of Britain Clasp to the 1939–45 Star by flying at least one authorised operational sortie with an eligible unit of the Royal Air Force or Fleet Air Arm during the period from 0001 hours on 10 July to 2359 hours 31 October 1940.

== History ==
In 1942, the Air Ministry made the decision to compile a list from records of the names of pilots who had lost their lives as a result of the fighting during the Battle of Britain (Note: This was initially regarded as being from 8 August to 31 October 1940; however, the dates were later amended to also include those who lost their lives between 10 July and 7 August.) for the purpose of building a national memorial. This became the Battle of Britain Chapel at Westminster Abbey, which was unveiled by King George VI on 10 July 1947. The Roll of Honour within the Chapel contains the names of 1,497 pilots and aircrew killed or mortally wounded during the Battle.

Nothing was done officially, however, to define the qualifications for the classification of a Battle of Britain airman until 9 November 1960. AMO N850, published by the Air Ministry, stated for the first time the requirements for the awarding of the Battle of Britain Star, and listed the 71 units which were deemed to have been under the control of RAF Fighter Command.

In 1955 Flt Lt John Holloway, a serving RAF officer, began a personal challenge to compile a complete list of "The Few". After fourteen years of research Flt Lt Holloway had 2,946 names on the list. Of these airmen, 537 were killed during the Battle or later died of wounds received.

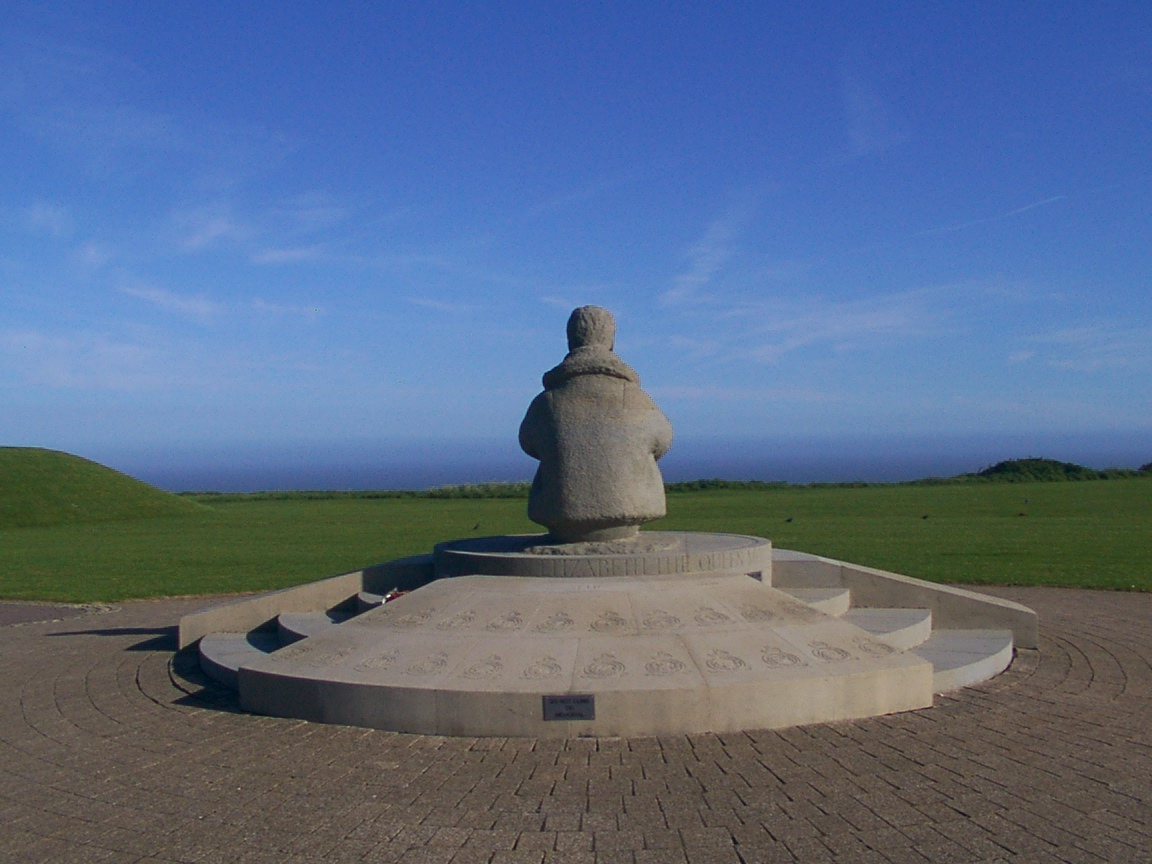
Battle of Britain Memorial at Capel-le-Ferne

The Battle of Britain Memorial Trust, founded by Geoffrey Page, raised funds for the construction of the Battle of Britain Memorial at Capel-le-Ferne near Folkestone in Kent. The Memorial, unveiled by Queen Elizabeth The Queen Mother on 9 July 1993, shares the site with the Christopher Foxley-Norris Memorial Wall on which a complete list of "The Few" is engraved.

More recently, the Battle of Britain Monument on the Victoria Embankment in London was unveiled on 18 September 2005 by Charles, Prince of Wales and his wife Camilla, Duchess of Cornwall. The idea for the monument was conceived by the Battle of Britain Historical Society which then set about raising funds for its construction. The outside of the monument is lined with bronze plaques listing all the Allied airmen who took part in the Battle.

== O ==
Name	Rank	Nationality	Sqn during Battle	Awards	Notes
Oaks, Trevor Walter	Sgt	NZ	235 Sqn		
O'Brian, Peter Geoffrey St.George	Flt Lt	CAN	152 & 257 Sqns	DFC*, ADC, OBE	Died 15 April 2007
O'Brien, Joseph Somerton	Sqn Ldr	BR	92 & 234 Sqns		KIA 7 September 1940
O'Byrne, Peter	Sgt	BR	73 & 501 Sqns		Died 13 June 1998
O'Connell, Anthony	Fg Off	BR	264 Sqn		Died 17 December 1976
O'Leary, Arthur Alexander	Sgt	BR	604 Sqn	DFC, DFM	Died 21 April 1987
O'Malley, Derek Keppel Coleridge	Fg Off	BR	264 Sqn		KIA 4 September 1940 (Pilot)
O'Meara, James Joseph	Plt Off	BR	64, 72 Sqns & 421 Flt	DSO, DFC*	Died 1974
O'Neill, Desmond Hugh	Fg Off	BR	611 & 41 Sqns		KIFA 11 October 1940: Mid-air collision with Sgt L R Carter; bailed out but parachute failed aged 25; son of Lt Col Edward M. M. & Ethel M. O'Neill of Glasnevin, Dublin, Ireland; husband of Muriel O'Neill. Buried in Streatham Park Cemetery, Surrey, Square 7A, Grave 12104.
O'Neill, John Anthony	Flt Lt	BR	601 & 238 Sqns	DFC	Died May 2008
Oelofse, Johannes Roelof Stephanus	Plt Off	SA	43 Sqn		KIA 8 August 1940
Odbert, Norman Cyril	Sqn Ldr	BR	64 Sqn	OBE	
Offenberg, Jean Henri Marie "Pyker"	Plt Off	BEL	145 Sqn		KIFA 22 January 1942
Ogilvie, Alfred Keith "Skeets"	Plt Off	CAN	609 Sqn	DFC	Later bailed out and taken POW 9 January 1941
Oglivie, Donald Bruce	Plt Off	BR	601 Sqn		Captured November 1943 and made POW
Ogilvy, Charles Alexander "Alastair"	Flt Lt	BR	610 Sqn	DFC	(30 November 1915 – 1995) Last name to be added to the Battle of Britain London Monument
Oldfield, Trevor Guest	Sgt	BR	64 & 92 Sqns		KIA 27 September 1940 (Pilot)
Olesen, Wilfrid Pallasen	Plt Off	BR	607 Sqn		Died 6 July 1950
Olenski, Zbigniew	Fg Off	POL	234 & 609 Sqns	KW	Died 20 June 1970
Olewinski, Boleslaw	Sgt	POL	111 Sqn		KIA 3 November 1940
Olive, Charles Gordon Chaloner	Flt Lt	AUS	65 Sqn	DFC	Died 1987
Oliver, George Dixon	Sgt	BR	23 Sqn		KIA 8 September 1941
Olver, Peter	Plt Off	BR	603 Sqns	DFC	Shot down, captured and taken POW 11 June 1943; Surviving aircrew Died 14 February 2013
Ommanney, Rupert John	Sgt	BR	229 Sqn		KIA 12 February 1942
Orchard, Harold Charles	Sgt	BR	65 Sqn		KIA 5 February 1941 (Pilot)
Orgias, Eric	Plt Off	NZ	23 Sqn		KIA 25 September 1940 aged 25 when as part of the crew of Blenheim L8369 it stalled and crashed on approach to landing near Stourbridge.
Ortmans, Victor Marcel M "Vicky"	Plt Off	BEL	229 Sqn		Captured and made POW 21 October 1941, KIFA 8 August 1950
Orzechowski, Jerzy	Plt Off	POL	607 Sqn	VM, KW**, DFC	Died 1988 in Canada.
Osmand, Alexander Gordon	Plt Off	BR	3 & 213 Sqns		KIA 20 October 1943
Ostaszewski-Ostoja, Piotr	Fg Off	POL	609 Sqn	KW**, DFC	Died 1965 London
Ostowicz, Antoni	Fg Off	POL	145 Sqn	KW*	MIA 11 August 1940
Overton, Charles Nevil "Teeny"	Fg Off	BR	43 Sqn	DFC	
Owen, Arthur Edward	AC	BR	600 Sqn		KIA 24 July 1941
Owen, Henry	Sgt	BR	219 Sqn		
Owen, William Gethin	Sgt	BR	235 Sqn	DFC	
Oxspring, Robert Wardlow "Bobby"	Flt Lt	BR	66 Sqn	DFC**, AFC	Died 8 August 1989

== P ==
Name	Rank	Nationality	Sqn during Battle	Awards	Notes
Page, Anthony Durrant "Tony"	Sgt	BR	111 Sqn		KIA 8 November 1940 (Pilot)
Page, Alan Geoffrey	Plt Off	BR	56 Sqn	OBE, DSO, DFC*	Died 3 August 2000.
Page, Arthur John	Sgt	BR	257 Sqn		KIA 24 October 1941 (Pilot)
Page, Cyril Leslie	Flt Lt	BR	234 Sqn		
Page, Vernon Douglas	Sgt	BR	610 & 601 Sqns	DFC	
Page, Wilfrid Thomas	Sgt	BR	1 Sqn		KIA 16 November 1943 (Malta)
Pain, John Francis	Plt Off	BR	32 Sqn		Died 12 September 1980
Paisey, Frederick George	Sgt	BR	235 Sqn	DFC	
Palak, Jan	Sgt	POL	303 & 302 Sqns	VM, KW**, DFC	Died 1987 Bath UK
Palliser, George Charles Calder "Titch"	Sgt	BR	43 & 249 Sqns	DFC, AE	Died 25 September 2011
Palmer, Norman Nelson	Sgt	BR	248 Sqn		KIA 8 February 1942
Palusinski, Jerzy Hipolit	Plt Off	POL	303 Sqn	VM, KW	Died 1984 UK
Pankratz, Wilhelm	Flt Lt	POL	145 Sqn	KW	MIA 12 August 1940
Pannell, Geoffrey Charles Russell	Sgt	NZ	3 Sqn	DFC, CdeG	Born Christchurch, New Zealand 22 August 1913. Commissioned August 1941; transferred to reserve January 1946; retired July 1962. Died Christchurch, 3 May 1980
Parke, Thomas Robert Verner	Sub Lt (FAA)	BR	804 NAS		KIA 7 July 1941
Parker, Denis Keith	Sgt	BR	66 Sqn		
Parker, Kenneth Bruce	Sgt	BR	64 & 92 Sqns		KIA 15 October 1940 (Pilot)
Parker, Thomas Campbell	Plt Off	BR	79 Sqn	OBE	
Parker, Vincent	Plt Off	BR	234 Sqn		Crashed taken as POW 15 August 1940; KIFA 29 January 1946
Parkes, William Bert	Sgt	BR	501 Sqn		
Parkin, Eric Gordon	Plt Off	BR	501 Sqn		Died 23 July 2008
Parkinson, Cecil	Sgt	BR	238 Sqn		WIA 20 July 1940; Died 21 July 1940 (Pilot)
Parnall, Denis Geach	Flt Lt	BR	249 Sqn		KIA 18 September 1940 (Pilot)
Parnall, Stuart Boyd	Plt Off	BR	607 Sqn		KIA 9 September 1940 (Pilot)
Parr, Douglas John	Sgt	BR	29 Sqn		KIA 7 November 1941
Parr, Leslie Alfred	Sgt	BR	79 Sqn		Died 1986
Parrott, Dennis Thomas	Fg Off	BR	19 Sqn		KIA 22 June 1941 (Pilot)
Parrott, Peter Lawrence	Fg Off	BR	145 & 605 Sqns	DFC, AFC	Retired as a Wg Cdr in 1965
Parrott, Reginald James	Sgt	BR	32 Sqn		KIA 5 May 1941 (Pilot)
Parry, Emlyn	AC2	BR	23 Sqn		KIA 28 May 1943 (Wireless Operator/Air Gunner)
Parry, Montague Edward	Sgt	BR	604 Sqn		
Parsons, Claude Arthur	Sgt	BR	66 & 610 Sqns		KIA 20 August 1941
Parsons, Edwin Ernest	Sgt	NZ	23 Sqn		Died 4 October 1977,
Parsons, John Graham	Sgt	BR	235 Sqn		
Parsons, Philip Trevor	Fg Off	BR	504 Sqn		KIA 2 October 1942 (Pilot)
Paszkiewicz, Ludwik Witold	Fg Off	POL	303 Sqn	VM, KW, DFC	KIA 7 September 1940
Paszkiewicz, Konrad Jozef	Fg Off	POL	303 Sqn	VM, KW**	Born 29 November 1920, Gorzkowice, Poland; discharged in 1948; died 29 May 2001 (aged 80) at Mablethorpe, Lincolnshire, England.
Paterek, Edward	Sgt	POL	302 & 303 Sqns	KW	MIA 28 March 1941
Paterson, Brian "Blinkers"	Sub Lt (FAA)	BR	804 NAS		
Paterson, James Alfred	Flt Lt	NZ	92 Sqn	MBE	KIA 27 September 1940 (Pilot); Posthumously awarded the MBE on 1 January 1941 for services in France during May 1940 (Battle of France).
Patrick, Leon Fred	Sgt	BR	222 Sqn		
Patston, Arthur George	Sgt	BR	604 Sqn		
Patten, Hubert Paul Frederick	Fg Off	BR	64 Sqn		Died 24 December 2002.
Patterson, Leonard John	Sgt	BR	501 Sqn		KIA 28 November 1940
Patterson, Peter John	Mid (FAA)	BR	242 Sqn		KIA 20 August 1940
Patterson, Norris Henry	Sub Lt (FAA)	BR	804 NAS		KIA 22 December 1941 (HMS Audacity)
Patterson, Robert Lawson	Plt Off	BR	242 Sqn		MIA 18 July 1940
Pattinson, Aberconway John Sefton	Fg Off	BR	616, 23 & 92 Sqns		KIA 12 October 1940 (Pilot)
Pattison, John David	Fg Off	CAN	1 RCAF Sqn		
Pattison, John Gordon	Fg Off	NZ	266 Sqn	DSO, DFC, CdeLd'H	Died 11 September 2009
Pattison, Kenneth Clifton	Sgt	BR	611 Sqn		WIA 13 October 1940 (Pilot)
Pattullo, William Blair	Plt Off	BR	151, 249 & 46 Sqns		WIA 26 October 1940 (Pilot)
Paul, Frank Dawson	Sub Lt (FAA)	BR	64 Sqn		WIA 30 July 1940
Pavitt, Harold John	Sgt	BR	235 Sqn		Died 1972
Pavlů, Otto	Sgt	CZ	1 Sqn		KIA 28 April 1943
Payne, Alec Dawson	Sgt	BR	610 Sqn		Died 16 December 2010.
Payne, Roy Ainley	Plt Off	BR	602 Sqn		
Payne, Reginald Irving	AC2	BR	23 Sqn		1909–1940 KIA 25 September 1940 when as radio operator/air gunner of Blenheim L8369 it stalled and crashed on approach to landing near Stourbridge.
Peachment, Charles Barton Gower	Plt Off	BR	236 Sqn		Retired as a Sqn Ldr in 1947; Died 1979
Peacock, Dennis Charles	Sgt	BR	605 Sqn		KIA 15 September 1942
Peacock, Reginald John	Fg Off	BR	235 Sqn	DFC	KIA 5 February 1943 (North Africa)
Peacock, William Albert	Sgt	BR	46 Sqn		MIA 11 September 1940
Peacock-Edwards, Spencer Ritchie	Plt Off	BR	253 & 615 Sqns	DFC	Died 1983
Pearce, Leonard Harold Borlase	Sgt	BR	32 & 615 Sqns		KIA 9 April 1941
Pearce, Peter Griffin	Sgt	BR	600 Sqn		KIA 15 December 1941
Pearce, Roy	Sgt	BR	29 Sqn		
Pearce, William John	Sgt	BR	236 & 23 Sqns		KIA 5 November 1941
Pearcy, Dennis Jack	Sgt	BR	219 Sqn		KIA 15 November 1940 (Air Gunner)
Pearman, Stanley James	Plt Off	BR	141 Sqn		
Pearse, Leslie Lewis	Sgt	BR	236 Sqn		
Pearson, Dennis Edward	Sgt	BR	236 Sqn		
Pearson, Geoffrey Wilberforce	Sgt	BR	501 Sqn		KIA 6 September 1940 (Pilot)
Pearson, Philip	Sgt	BR	238 Sqn		KIA 29 May 1942 (Egypt)
Pease, Arthur Peter	Plt Off	BR	74 Sqn & 603 Sqns		KIA 15 September 1940 (Pilot)
Peebles, William	Sgt	BR	235 Sqn		KIA 7 May 1941
Peel, Charles David	Fg Off	BR	603 Sqn		MIA 17 July 1940
Peel, John Ralph Alexander	Sqn Ldr	BR	145 Sqn (CO)	DFC	
Pegge, Constantine Oliver Joseph	Plt Off	BR	603 Sqn	DFC*	Died 9 May 1950
Pemberton, David Alwyne	Sqn Ldr	BR	1 Sqn (CO)	DFC	KIA 3 November 1940
Penfold, Paul Eric	Plt Off	BR	29 Sqn		
Penfold, William David	Sgt	BR	236 Sqn		
Penford, Vernon William Rex	Flt Sgt	BR	23 Sqn		Died 1976
Pennington, Denis Arthur	Plt Off	BR	263 & 245 Sqns	DFC	
Pennington-Leigh, Alan William	Flt Lt	BR	232 & 248 Sqns		KIA 1 June 1943 (Singapore)
Pennycuick, Bruce	Sgt	BR	236 Sqn		
Percy, Hugh Harold	Plt Off	BR	264 Sqn		KIA 22 May 1944
Perkin, Frederick Stanley	Sgt	BR	73 Sqn & 421 Flt		Died 1988
Perrin, Georges Camille	Adjutant	Free FR	615 & 249 Sqns		Died 1981
Perry, Harry Thomas	Sgt	BR	23 Sqn		KIA 30 October 1940
Peters, George Charles Boyce	Fg Off	BR	79 Sqn		KIA 29 September 1940 (Pilot)
Peterson, Otto John	Plt Off	CAN	1 Sqn RCAF		KIA 27 September 1940 (Pilot)
Pettet, Alexander Henry	Plt Off	BR	248 Sqn		MIA 13 December 1940
Pettit, Henry William	Sgt	BR	605 & 1 Sqns		KIA 2 February 1941
Pexton, Richard Dunning	Fg Off	BR	615 Sqn	DFC, AFC	
Pfeiffer, Jan Piotr	Plt Off	POL	257 & 32 Sqns		MIA 20 December 1943
Philipart, Jacques Arthur Laurent	Plt Off	BEL	213 Sqn		KIA 25 August 1940 when he was shot down in Hurricane V7226, Philipart baled out into the sea and was killed.
Phillip, James	Sgt	BR	25 Sqn		KIA 17 May 1942
Phillips, Austin	AC	BR	604 Sqn		
Phillips, Ernest Russell	Plt Off	BR	25 Sqn		KIA 14 February 1941 (Pilot)
Phillips, Norman Taylor	Flt Sgt	BR	65 Sqn		KIA 8 August 1940 (Pilot)
Phillips, Randall Frederick Prenter	Sgt	BR	602 Sqn		Died 28 March 1998
Phillipson, John Ross	Sgt	BR	604 Sqn	DFC	KIA 5 January 1943 (Wireless Operator/Observer)
Philo, Robert Ferguson	Plt Off	BR	151 Sqn		
Piatkowski, Stanislaw	Plt Off	POL	79 Sqn		KIA 25 October 1940
Pickering, James	Sgt	BR	64 Sqn	AFC	
Pickering, John Harcourt	Plt Off	BR	66 Sqn		KIA 15 March 1942 (Pilot)
Pickering, Tony Garforth	Sgt	BR	32 & 501 Sqns	MID, AE	Died 4 April 2016 | Aged 70 years of age | True, genuine and a modest hero to Britain (Pilot)
Pickford, James Thomas	Sgt	BR	604 Sqn		
Pidd, Leslie	Sgt	BR	238 Sqn		KIA 15 September 1940 (Pilot)
Pigg, Oswald St John	Fg Off	BR	72 Sqn		KIA 1 September 1940 (Pilot)
Pilch, Edward Roman	Plt Off	POL	302 Sqn	VM, KW*	KIA 20 February 1941
Pilkington, Alfred	Sgt	BR	23 Sqn		
Pilkington-Miksa, Wlodzimierz Janusz	Plt Off	POL	303 Sqn	VM, KW**, DFC	Flew as Wlodzimierz Miksa during the war.
Pinckney, David John Colin	Fg Off	BR	603 Sqn		KIA 23 January 1942
Pinfold, Herbert Moreton	Flt Lt	BR	56 Sqn (CO)		Died 19 October 2009
Pinkham, Philip Campbell	Sqn Ldr	BR	19 Sqn	AFC	KIA 5 September 1940 (Pilot)
Pípa, Josef	Sgt	CZ	43 Sqn	CdeG, MC***	Died 2 January 1977.
Piper, Arthur Howard	Sgt	BR	236 Sqn	DFC	
Pippard, Harold Alfred	Plt Off	BR	29 Sqn		
Pippet, John Gilbert	Fg Off	BR	64 Sqn		KIA 23 February 1941
Pisarek, Marian	Fg Off	POL	303 Sqn	VM IV & V, KW***, DFC	MIA 29 April 1942
Pitcher, Paul Brooke	Fg Off	CAN	401 Sqn	MiD	
Pittman, Geoffrey Edward	Plt Off	BR	17 Sqn		
Plant, Ronald Eric	Sgt	BR	603		KIA 21 November 1940 (Pilot)
Pledger, Geoffrey Frank Colman	Plt Off	BR	141 Sqn		KIA 4 April 1941 (Air Gunner)
Plenderleith, Robert	Sgt	BR	73 Sqn	DFC	
Plummer, Richard Pryer	Fg Off	BR	46 Sqn		WIA 4 September 1940; died 14 September 1940
Plzák, Stanislav	Sgt	CZ	310 & 19 Sqns		MIA 7 August 1941
Pniak, Karol	Plt Off	POL	32 Sqn	VM, KW***, DFC	Died 10980 Poland
Pocock, Maurice Henry	Sgt	BR	72 Sqn		
Pollard, John Kenneth	Sgt	BR	232 Sqn		KIA 12 December 1941
Pollard, Phillip Selwyn Covey	Fg Off	BR	611 Sqn		KIA 22 June 1941
Pond, Arthur Herbert Dorrien	Flt Sgt	BR	601 Sqn	AFC	
Ponting, William Alan	Plt Off	BR	264 Sqn		KIA 24 August 1940
Pool, Peter Desmond	Plt Off	BR	266 & 72 Sqns		MIA 19 August 1942
Poole, Eric Leonard Ronald	Sgt	BR	604 Sqn		
Poplawski, Jerzy	Plt Off	POL	111 & 229 Sqns	VM, KW***	Died 2004 Argentina
Porter, Edward Francis	Sgt	BR	141 Sqn		KIA 2 July 1941 (Pilot)
Porter, John Anthony	Sgt	BR	615, 19 & 242 Sqns		
Porter, Owen Wells	Sgt	BR	111 Sqn		KIA 31 July 1944 (France)
Posener, Frederick Hyam	Plt Off	SA	152 Sqn		MIA 20 July 1940
Potter, John Alfred	Sgt	BR	19 Sqn		Wounded and taken POW 15 September 1940; died 1977
Poulton, Harry Robert Godfrey	Plt Off	BR	64 Sqn	dfc	Captured and taken POW January 1944
Pound, Reginald Robert Charles	Sgt	BR	25 Sqn		(Wireless Operator)
Powell, Edwin	Sgt	BR	25 Sqn		KIA 21 November 1940
Powell, Robin Peter Reginald	Flt Lt	BR	111 Sqn		Died 28 January 1970
Powell, Ronald James	Plt Off	BR	248 Sqn		KIA 2 July 1941
Powell, Sydney William Martin	Sgt	BR	141 Sqn		Died 1979
Powell-Shedden, George Ffolliott	Flt Lt	BR	242 Sqn	DSO*DFC	Died November 1994
Power, Richard Maurice	Flt Lt	AUS	236 Sqn		
Prchal, Eduard Maximilian	Sgt	CZ	310 Sqn		Died 4 December 1964 Died 1984
Preater, Stanley George	Sgt	BR	235 Sqn		→ died 2 December 2008.
Prevot, Leon O J	Plt Off	BEL	235 Sqn	CDeG, DFC	
Priak, K	Plt Off	BEL	32 & 257 Sqns		KIA – details unknown
Price, Arthur Owen	Plt Off	BR	236 Sqn		Died 1982
Price, James	Sgt	BR	29 Sqn	DFM	Died 16 March 1988
Price, Norman Albert Joseph	Sgt	BR	236 Sqn		
Price, Robert Buckton	Sgt	BR	245, 222 & 73 Sqns		KIA 15 November 1941
Priestley, John Sinclair	Fg Off	NZ	235 Sqn		KIA 30 August 1940
Příhoda, Josef	Sgt	CZ	1 Sqn		MIA 6 March 1943
Pritchard, Charles Arthur	Flt Lt	BR	600 Sqn	DFC	
Proctor, Jack	Sgt	BR	602 Sqn		KIA 18 April 1941 (Pilot)
Proctor, John Ernest	Plt Off	NZ	32 Sqn	DFC	
Prosser, Percy Rollo	Sgt	BR	235 Sqn		KIA 16 December 1940
Proudman, Douglas Harry	Sgt	BR	248 Sqn		WIA 27 April 1941 (Wirless Operator/Air Gunner)
Prowse, Harry Arthur Robin	Plt Off	BR	256 & 603 Sqns		(1921–2010)
Ptáček, Rudolf	Sgt	CZ	43 Sqn		KIA 28 March 1942
Půda, Rajmund	Sgt	CZ	310 & 605 Sqns		Died 17 March 2002
Pudney, Geoffrey Bruce	Sub Lt (FAA)	BR	64 Sqn		KIA 26 August 1941
Pugh, John Stuart	Sgt	BR	25 Sqn	DFC	
Pugh, Thomas Patrick	Flt Lt	BR	263 Sqn (CO)	DFC	KIA 2 August 1943
Pushman, George Rupert	Plt Off	CAN	23 Sqn	DFC	Died 2001
Putt, Alan Robert	Flt Lt	BR	501 Sqn		Died 1977
Puxley, William George Vernon	Sgt	BR	236 Sqn		
Pye, John Walter	Sgt	BR	25 Sqn		
Pyman, Lawrence Lee	Plt Off	BR	65 Sqn		MIA 16 August 1940 (Pilot)
Pyne, Colin Campbell	Sgt	NZ	219 Sqn		Died 19 February 1975.

== Q ==
Name	Rank	Nationality	Sqn during Battle	Awards	Notes
Quelch, Basil Herbert	Sgt	BR	235 Sqn	DFC	(1919–1994)
Quill, Jeffrey Kindersley	Fg Off	BR	65 Sqn	AFC	Development and production test pilot for Spitfire. Only flew in combat for 19 days to gain experience. Died 20 February 1996
Quinn, James	Sgt	BR	236 Sqn	DFC	

== R ==
Name	Rank	Nationality	Sqn during Battle	Awards	Notes
Rabagliati, Alexander Coultate "Sandy"	Flt Lt	BR	43 Sqn	DFC and Bar	KIA 6 July 1943
Rabone, John Henry Michael	Fg Off	BR	604 Sqn		
Rabone, Paul Wattling	Plt Off	BR	145 Sqn	DFC	KIA 24 July 1944 (Belgium)
Radomski, Jerzy	Plt Off	POL	303 Sqn	VM, KW***	Died 1978.
Radwanski, Gustaw	Plt Off	POL	151, 56 & 607 Sqns	KW**	
Rafter, William Pearce Houghton	Plt Off	BR	603 Sqn		KIA 29 November 1940
Raine, Woodrow	Sgt	BR	610 Sqn		KIA 21 August 1941 (France)(Pilot)
Rains, Douglas Norman	Sgt	BR	248 Sqn		KIA 12 August 1942 (Wireless Operator/Air Gunner)
Ralls, Leslie Francis	Sgt	BR	605 Sqn		(1916–1976)
Ramsay, John Basil	Plt Off	BR	151 Sqn		KIA 18 August 1940
Ramsay, John Strachan	Sgt	BR	235 Sqn		KIA 27 April 1941
Ramsay, Norman Hugh Donald	Sgt	BR	610 Sqn & 222 Sqns	DFC	
Ramshaw, John William	Sgt	BR	222 Sqn		KIA 4 September 1940 (Pilot)
Rasmussen, Laurie Andrew Woodney	Sgt	NZ	264 Sqn		KIA 4 September 1940
Ravenhill, Malcolm	Plt Off	BR	229 Sqn		KIA 30 September 1940 (Pilot)
Rawlence, Anthony James	Plt Off	BR	600 Sqn		
Rawnsley, Cecil Frederick	Sgt	BR	604 Sqn	DSO, DFC, DFM*	1904-1965
Ray, R W	Sgt	BR	56 Sqn		Died 1985
Raymond, P	Fg Off	BR	609 Sqn		
Rayner, Roderick Malachi Seaburne	Plt Off	BR	87 Sqn	DFC	Died 1982
Read, William Albert Alexander	Fg Off	BR	603 Sqn	AFC	
Ream, Charles Alfred	Sgt	BR	235 Sqn		Died 1947
Reardon-Parker, John	Sub Lt (FAA)	BR	804 NAS		KIA 7 June 1944
Řechka, Josef	Sgt	CZ	310 Sqn		Died 1984
Reddingon, Leslie Arthur Edwin	Sgt	BR	152 Sqn		MIA 30 September 1940
Redfern, Eric Arthur	Sgt	BR	232 Sqn		KIA 17 August 1941
Redman, John	Plt Off	BR	257, 245 & 43 Sqns		KIA 20 April 1943
Reece, Lawrence Hugh Murray	Sgt	BR	235 Sqn		MIA 18 July 1940
Reed, Horace	Sgt	BR	600 Sqn		
Rees, Brian Victor	Plt Off	BR	610 Sqn		Died 1979
Reid, Robert	Plt Off	BR	46 Sqn		MIA 23 March 1945
Reilley, Hugh William	Plt Off	CAN/AME	64 & 66 Sqns		KIA 17 October 1940
Reilly, Charles Christopher	Sgt	NZ	23 Sqn		KIA 28 October 1942
Renvoize, James Verdun	Sgt	BR	247 Sqn		
Reynell, Richard Carew	Flt Lt	AUS	43 Sqn		KIA 7 September 1940
Reyno, Edwin Michael	Flt Lt	CAN	1 Sqn RCAF	AFC, CD	Died 10 February 1982.
Rhodes, Richard Arthur	Plt Off	BR	29 Sqn		MIA 25 August 1940 when Blenheim L1330 was probably shot down in combat off Wainfleet and crashed into the sea, of the other two crew members one missing and one killed.
Rhodes-Moorhouse, William Henry	Flt Lt	BR	601 Sqn	DFC	KIA 6 September 1940
Ricalton, Alan Leslie	Plt Off	BR	74 Sqn		KIA 17 October 1940
Rich, Peter Godfrey	Sgt	BR	25 Sqn		
Richards, Duncan Hamilton	Sub Lt (FAA)	BR	111 Sqn		Died 2 September 1955.
Richards, William Charles	Sgt	BR	235 Sqn		MIA 11 August 1941
Richardson, Cecil James	Sgt	BR	29 Sqn		MIA 31 July 1940 aged 29 following a collision between Blenheims L6722 and L1408 over the Bristol Channel.
Richardson, Eric	Sgt	BR	242 Sqn	DFC	
Richardson, George Frederick	Sqn Ldr	BR	54 Sqn		Died 2007
Richardson, Roland Wharrier	Sgt	BR	610 Sqn	AFC	Died 18 November 1988.
Richardson, Ronald William	Sgt	BR	610 Sqn		Died December 1970.
Richardson, William Arthur	Sqn Ldr	BR	141 Sqn (CO)		Died 1970.
Ricketts, Herbert Wain	Sgt	BR	235 Sqn		KIA 31 March 1945
Ricketts, Victor Anthony	Plt Off	BR	248 Sqn	DFC	KIA 12 July 1942; Flew De Havilland Comet racer Grosvenor House from England to New Zealand and back in 1938.
Ricks, Leo Patrick Vincent John	Sgt	CAN	235 Sqn		Died 8 January 1985.
Riddell-Hannam, John Derrick	Sgt	BR	236 Sqn		
Riddle, Christopher John Henry "Jack"	Fg Off	BR	601 Sqn		Died 8 August 2009.
Riddle, Hugh Joseph	Fg Off	BR	601 Sqn		Died 16 April 2009.
Ridley, Marmaduke	Sgt	BR	616 Sqn		KIA 26 August 1940 (Pilot)
Rigby, Robert Harold	Plt Off	BR	236 Sqn		KIA 18 July 1940 (Pilot)
Riley, Frederick	Plt Off	BR	236 Sqn		Former Olympic footballer. KIA 7 December 1942 (Pilot)
Riley, William	Flt Lt	BR	302 Sqn	DFC	KIA 16 July 1942 (North Africa)
Rimmer, Reginald Frank	Flt Lt	BR	229 Sqn		KIA 27 September 1940 (Pilot)
Ringwood, Eric Alfred	Sgt	BR	248 Sqn		MIA 27 August 1940
Ripley, William George	Sgt	BR	604 Sqn	DFM	KIA 16 November 1943 (Belgium) (Navigator/Wireless Operator)
Rippon, Anthony John	Plt Off	BR	601 Sqn	DFC	KIA 25 August 1944 (Pilot)
Riseley, Arthur Harry	Sgt	BR	600 Sqn	DSO	
Ritcher, Geoffrey Louis	Plt Off	BR	234 Sqn		Died 1999
Ritchie, Ian Smail	Plt Off	BR	603 Sqn		
Ritchie, John Millar	Plt Off	BR	141 Sqn		
Ritchie, James Ritchie	Plt Off	BR	111 Sqn		
Ritchie, Robert Douglas	Sgt	BR	605 Sqn		KIA 9 August 1940 (Pilot)
Ritchie, Thomas Glyn Finlayson	Plt Off	BR	602 Sqn		KIA 21 July 1941 (Pilot)
Roach, Robert James Bain	Plt Off	BR	266 Sqn		
Robb, Robert Andrew Lindsay	Plt Off	BR	236 Sqn		
Robbins, Robert Horley	Sgt	BR	54 & 66 Sqns		
Roberts, Arthur John Alan	Sgt	BR	29 Sqn	DFC	
Roberts, David Francis	Sgt	BR	25 Sqn		KIA 3 April 1941 (Wireless Operator)
Roberts, David Neal	Wg Cdr	BR	609 & 328 Sqns	AFC	
Roberts, Elwyn Cooper	Sgt	BR	23 Sqn		
Roberts, George William	Mid (FAA)	BR	808 NAS		
Roberts, Ralph	Plt Off	BR	615 & 64 Sqns		Died 1994
Robertson, Basil Lionel	Sgt	BR	54 Sqn		KIA 12 February 1942
Robertson, Frederick Neal	Sgt	BR	66 Sqn	DFM	KIA 31 August 1943 (Pilot)
Robinson, Andrew Ian	Flt Lt	BR	222 Sqn		Died 1958
Robinson, Denis Norman	Sgt	BR	152 Sqn		24 Jun 1918 – 28 July 2015
Robinson, Gerald	Plt Off	BR	264 Sqn		
Robinson, James	Sgt	BR	111 Sqn	AFC	KIFA 2 July 1956
Robinson, James Clifton Edmeston	Plt Off	BR	1 Sqn		KIA 21 May 1941
Robinson, Marcus	Sqn Ldr	BR	616 Sqn	AFC	
Robinson, Maurice Wilbraham Sandford	Sqn Ldr	BR	73 Sqn	CBE	Died 1977
Robinson, Michael Lister	Flt Lt	BR	610, 619, & 238 Sqds	DSO, DFC	MIA 10 April 1942
Robinson, Peter Beverley	Flt Lt	BR	601 Sqn		
Robinson, Peter Trevor	Sgt	BR	257 Sqn		Died 3 October 1975
Robinson, Peter Ethelbert Merrick	Sgt	BR	56 Sqn		KIA 17 June 1941 (Pilot)
Robshaw, Frederick Aspinall	Plt Off	BR	229 Sqn		
Robson, Norman Charles Harold	Plt Off	BR	72 Sqn		Died 18 January 1954
Roden, Henry Adrian Charles	Sgt	BR	19 Sqn		WIA 15 November 1940; died 16 November 1940 (Pilot)
Rofe, Bernard John	Plt Off	BR	25 Sqn		KIA 12 January 1942
Rogers, Bruce Arthur	Plt Off	BR	242 Sqn		KIA 17 June 1941 (France)
Rogers, Everett Bryan	Plt Off	BR	501 & 615 Sqns	DFC	Died 1960
Rogers, George Wade	Sgt	BR	234 Sqn		KIA 16 January 1941
Rogowski, Jan	Sgt	POL	303 & 74 Sqn		Died Ipswich UK 1997
Roháček, Rudolf Bohumil	Plt Off	CZ	238 & 601 Sqns		KIA 27 April 1942
Rolls, William Thomas Edward	Sgt	BR	72 Sqn	DFC, DFM, AE	Died July 1988
Roman, Charles Louis	Plt Off	BEL	236 Sqn	DFC	Died 1951
Romanis, Andrew Lunn	Sgt	BR	25 Sqn		KIA 16 November 1940 (Wireless Operator/Air Gunner)
Rook, Anthony Hartwell	Flt Lt	BR	504 Sqn	DFC, AFC	Died 1976
Rook, Michael	Plt Off	BR	504 Sqn		KIFA 13 March 1948
Roscoe, Geoffrey Lawrence	Fg Off	BR	87 Sqn		KIA 24 February 1942 (Pilot)
Rose, Edward Brian Mortimer	Plt Off	BR	234 Sqn	DFC*	Pilot KIA 1943 (correct surname is Mortimer-Rose but appears in records as Rose)
Rose, Jack	Fg Off	BR	32 & 3 Sqns	CMG, MBE, DFC	Died 10 October 2009.
Rose, James Stanley	Sgt	BR	23 Sqn		KIA 4 March 1941 (Pilot)
Rose, Stuart Nigel	Plt Off	BR	602 Sqn	MID, AE	
Rose-Price, Arthur Thomas	Plt Off	BR	501 Sqn		KIA 2 September 1940
Rosier, Fredrick Ernest	Sqn Ldr	BR	229 Sqn	GCB, CBE, DSO	Died 10 September 1998
Ross, Alexander Richard	Plt Off	BR	25 & 610 Sqn		KIA 15 April 1941 (Pilot)
Ross, Jack Kenneth	Plt Off	BR	17 Sqn	DFC	KIA 6 January 1942.
Rothwell, John Hedley	Plt Off	BR	601, 605 & 32 Sqns		KIA 22 February 1941 (Pilot)
Round, James Henry	Sgt	BR	248 Sqn		KIA 19 August 1940
Rourke, John	Sgt	BR	248 Sqn		Died 1966
Rouse, Geoffrey Walter	Sgt	BR	236 Sqn		
Rowden, John Hampton	Plt Off	BR	64 & 616 Sqns		KIA 9 April 1941 (Pilot)
Rowell, Peter Archibald	Sgt	BR	249 Sqn	AFC	
Rowley, Richard Michael Bernard	Plt Off	BR	145 Sqn		
Royce, Michael Elliot Appelbee	Fg Off	BR	504 Sqn		
Royce, William Barrington	Fg Off	BR	504 Sqn	DFC	Died 1979.
Rozwadowski, Mieczyslaw	Plt Off	POL	151 Sqn	KW*	MIA 15 August 1940
Rozycki, Wladyslaw	Plt Off	POL	238 Sqn	VM, KW**, DFC	
Ruddock, Wilfred Shepherd	Sgt	BR	23 Sqn		Died 6 November 1980.
Rudland, Clifford Percival	Sgt	BR	263 Sqn	DFC	
Rushmer, Frederick William	Flt Lt	BR	603 Sqn		KIA 5 September 1940 (Pilot)
Russel, Blair Dalzell "Dal"	Fg Off	CAN	1 Sqn RCAF	DFC*, DSO, CdeG	Died 20 November 2007
Russell, Anthony Gerald	Sgt	BR	43 Sqn		Surviving aircrew
Russell, Godfrey Fredrick	Lt (FAA)	BR	804 NAS; HMS Merlin		KIA 13 December 1940
Russell, Graham Herbert	Plt Off	BR	236 Sqn	DFC	
Russell, John Trevor	Plt Off	BR	141 Sqn		
Russell, Leslie Plimmer	Sgt	NZ	264 Sqn		KIA 19 May 1942 (Air Gunner)
Russell, Humphrey a'Beckett	Flt Lt	BR	32 Sqn	DFC	
Rust, Charles Alan	Sgt	BR	85 & 249 Sqns		
Ruston, Paul	Flt Lt	BR	604 Sqn		Died 11 January 1954.
Rutter, Robert Durham	Plt Off	BR	73 Sqn		
Ryall, Browne	Cpl	BR	29 Sqn		MIA 7 May 1941
Ryalls, Derek Lang	Plt Off	BR	FIU		KIA 26 December 1944 (Belgium) (Pilot)
Ryder, Edgar Norman	Flt Lt	BR	41 Sqn	DFC*, MiD	Born Risalpur, India, 28 November 1914; Commissioned October 1936; shot down and taken POW, 31 October 1941 (while CO of Kenley Wg; retired October 1960, retaining Gp Capt; died October 1995 (aged 80)
Rypl, František	Plt Off	CZ	310 Sqn		

== Notes on table ==
- Ranks given are those held during the Battle of Britain, although a higher rank may have been achieved after the Battle.
- All individuals listed in bold and highlighted in silver are believed to be still alive.
- Aircrew listed as KIA, MIA, WIA or KIFA during the Battle of Britain are highlighted in blue.
- The awards listed include those made during the Battle of Britain and during the remainder of World War II, as well as any made post-war.
- In order to limit the numbers of footnotes which would otherwise be required, the symbol ‡ under "Notes" indicates several entries in the text of Ramsay 1989, while the symbol † indicates that information on the circumstances under which an airman became a casualty during the Battle is included in the text of the book. Where more than one crew member of a multi place aircraft was involved this is included as a cross-reference under "Notes"
- In addition to 2,353 British aircrew, the RAF Roll of Honour recognises 574 personnel from other countries; namely:

Australia, Barbados, Belgium, Canada, Czechoslovakia, France, Ireland, Jamaica, Newfoundland, New Zealand, Poland, Rhodesia, South Africa and the United States.

=== Abbreviations ===
- (CO) after "Sqn" denotes Commanding Officer of that squadron, as per the RAF Fighter Command Order of Battle on 15 September 1940, unless otherwise indicated.
- (FAA) after a rank denotes a member of the Fleet Air Arm rather than the RAF.
- "KIA" – "killed in action"
- "KIFA" – "killed in flying accident", i.e. not during combat
- "MIA" – "missing in action".
- "WIA" – "wounded in action" leading to death which, in some cases, may have occurred months later.
- "POW" – "prisoner of war".
- For details of RAF rank abbreviations, see RAF Commissioned Officer Ranks and RAF Non-Commissioned Officer Ranks.
- For details of FAA rank abbreviations, see FAA Commissioned Officer Ranks.

=== Nationalities ===
AME	American
AUS	Australian
BEL	Belgian
BR	British
CAN	Canadian
CZ	Czechoslovak
FR	French
IRE	Irish
NZ	New Zealander
POL	Poland
RHO	Rhodesian
SA	South African

=== Awards ===
Award	Title	Notes
AE	Air Efficiency Award	Awarded for ten years' efficient service in the Royal Auxiliary Air Force
AFC	Air Force Cross	Awarded for "an act or acts of valour, courage or devotion to duty whilst flying, though not in active operations against the enemy".
CB	Companion of The Order of the Bath	Awarded at the monarch's pleasure
CDeG	Croix de Guerre	A military decoration of both France and Belgium, also commonly bestowed to foreign military forces allied to France and Belgium.
CdeL	Croix de la Libération	A decoration of France awarded for very meritorious conduct with the Free French Forces during World War II.
CdeLd'H	Croix de Légion d'honneur	A decoration of France awarded for excellent civil or military conduct delivered, upon official investigation.
CdeLL	Croix de L'Ordre de Leopold	Awarded to Belgian nationals or some distinguished foreign persons who made very important contributions to the Belgian state or society.
DFC	Distinguished Flying Cross	Awarded to Royal Air Force commissioned officers and Warrant Officers for "an act or acts of valour, courage or devotion to duty whilst flying in active operations against the enemy".
DFC*	Distinguished Flying Cross and Bar	A bar is added to the ribbon for holders of the DFC who received a second award.
DFC**	Distinguished Flying Cross and Bar	A second bar is added to the ribbon for holders of the DFC and Bar who received a third award.
DFM	Distinguished Flying Medal	Awarded to military below commissioned rank, for "an act or acts of valour, courage or devotion to duty whilst flying in active operations against the enemy".
DSO	Distinguished Service Order	Awarded for meritorious or distinguished service by officers of the armed forces during wartime, typically in actual combat.
DSO*	Distinguished Service Order and Bar	A bar is added to the ribbon for holders of the DSO who received a second award.
DSO**	Distinguished Service Order and Two Bars	A second bar is added to the ribbon for holders of the DSO and Bar who received a third award.
GCB	Knight Grand Cross of The Order of the Bath	Awarded at the monarch's pleasure
KCVO	Knight Commander of the Royal Victorian Order	Awarded for personal service to the sovereign
KStJ	Knight of the Order of Saint John	
KW	Krzyz Walecznych, Polish "Cross of Valour"	Awarded to an individual who "has demonstrated deeds of valour and courage on the field of battle."
KZ	Krzyz Zaslugi, Polish "Cross of Merit"	Awarded for exemplary public service or humanitarian work that goes above and beyond the call of duty.
MBE	Member of the Order of the British Empire	Awarded at the monarch's pleasure
MC	Military Cross	Awarded for "an act or acts of exemplary gallantry during active operations against the enemy on land to all members, of any rank".
MM	Military Medal	Awarded for acts of gallantry and devotion to duty under fire
OBE	Officer of the Order of the British Empire	Awarded at the monarch's pleasure
OStJ	Officer of the Order of Saint John	
VC	Victoria Cross	Highest British military decoration, awarded for valour in the face of the enemy.
VM	Virtuti Militari	Highest Polish military award for courage in the face of the enemy.

== See also ==
- Non-British personnel in the RAF during the Battle of Britain
- List of World War II aces from the United Kingdom
- List of World War II flying aces by country
- List of World War II flying aces
- List of RAF aircrew in the Battle of Britain (A–C)
- List of RAF aircrew in the Battle of Britain (D–F)
- List of RAF aircrew in the Battle of Britain (G–K)
- List of RAF aircrew in the Battle of Britain (L–N)
- List of RAF aircrew in the Battle of Britain (S–U)
- List of RAF aircrew in the Battle of Britain (V–Z)

== Bibliography ==
- Ramsay, Winston, ed. The Battle of Britain Then and Now Mk V. London: Battle of Britain Prints International Ltd, 1989. ISBN 0-900913-46-0.
- Ringlstetter, Herbert (2005). Helmut Wick, An Illustrated Biography of the Luftwaffe Ace And Commander of Jagdgeschwader 2 During The Battle of Britain. Atglen, PA: Schiffer Publishing. ISBN 0-7643-2217-6.
- Remembering the Battle of Britain
- Robert Dixon, '607 Squadron: A Shade of Blue'. The History Press 2008. ISBN 978-0-7524-4531-1
- Robert Dixon, 'A Gathering of Eagles' PublishBritannica 2004, ISBN 1-4137-3498-7
