= List of RAF aircrew in the Battle of Britain (L–N) =

The following is a list of pilots and other aircrew who flew during the Battle of Britain, and were awarded the Battle of Britain Clasp to the 1939–45 Star by flying at least one authorised operational sortie with an eligible unit of the Royal Air Force or Fleet Air Arm during the period from 0001 hours on 10 July to 2359 hours 31 October 1940.

== History ==
In 1942, the Air Ministry made the decision to compile a list from records of the names of pilots who had lost their lives as a result of the fighting during the Battle of Britain (Note: This was initially regarded as being from 8 August to 31 October 1940; however, the dates were later amended to also include those who lost their lives between 10 July and 7 August.) for the purpose of building a national memorial. This became the Battle of Britain Chapel at Westminster Abbey, which was unveiled by King George VI on 10 July 1947. The Roll of Honour within the Chapel contains the names of 1,497 pilots and aircrew killed or mortally wounded during the Battle.

Nothing was done officially, however, to define the qualifications for the classification of a Battle of Britain airman until 9 November 1960. AMO N850, published by the Air Ministry, stated for the first time the requirements for the awarding of the Battle of Britain Star, and listed the 71 units which were deemed to have been under the control of RAF Fighter Command.

In 1955 Flt Lt John Holloway, a serving RAF officer, began a personal challenge to compile a complete list of "The Few". After fourteen years of research Flt Lt Holloway had 2,946 names on the list. Of these airmen, 537 were killed during the Battle or later died of wounds received.

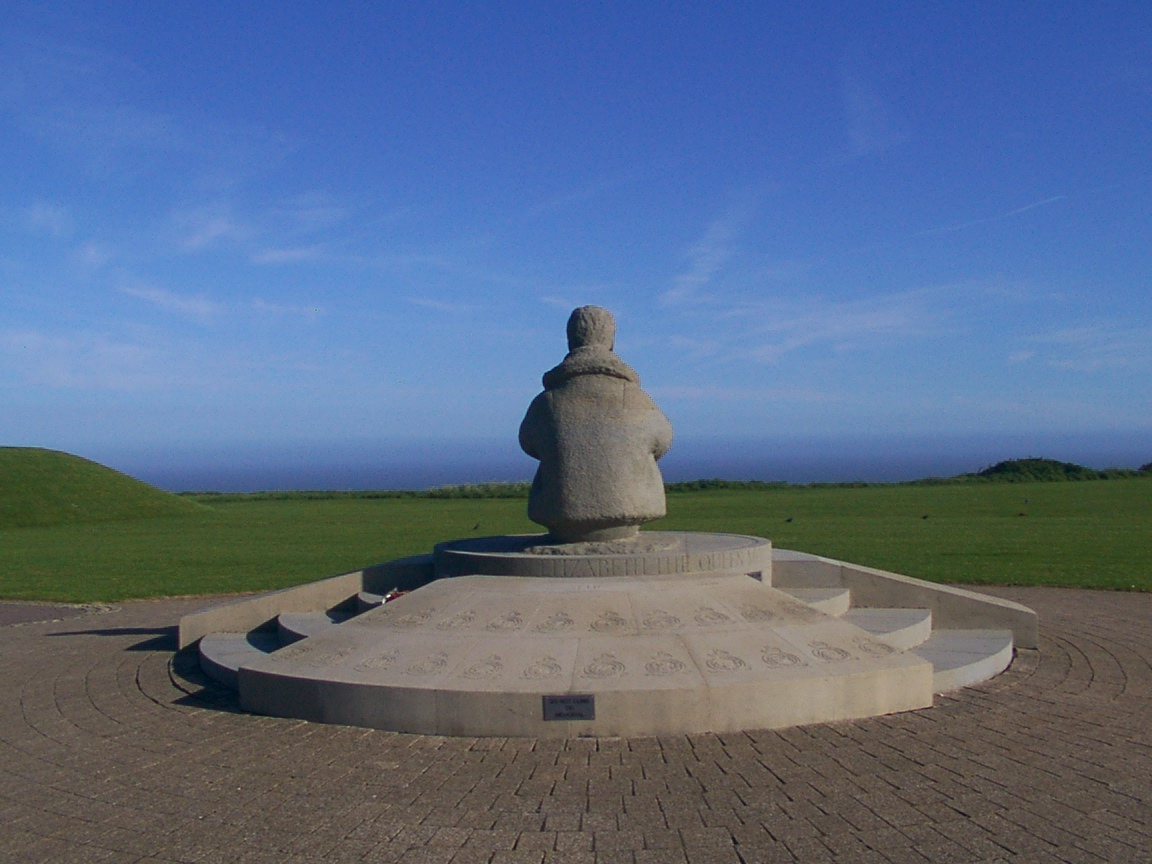
Battle of Britain Memorial at Capel-le-Ferne

The Battle of Britain Memorial Trust, founded by Geoffrey Page, raised funds for the construction of the Battle of Britain Memorial at Capel-le-Ferne near Folkestone in Kent. The Memorial, unveiled by Queen Elizabeth The Queen Mother on 9 July 1993, shares the site with the Christopher Foxley-Norris Memorial Wall on which a complete list of "The Few" is engraved.

More recently, the Battle of Britain Monument on the Victoria Embankment in London was unveiled on 18 September 2005 by Charles, Prince of Wales and his wife Camilla, Duchess of Cornwall. The idea for the monument was conceived by the Battle of Britain Historical Society which then set about raising funds for its construction. The outside of the monument is lined with bronze plaques listing all the Allied airmen who took part in the Battle.

== L ==
Name	Rank	Nationality	Sqn during Battle	Awards	Notes
Lacey, Edward Richard	Sgt	BR	219 Sqn	DSO	18 August 1920 – 10 March 1980
Lacey, James Harry "Ginger"	Sgt	BR	501 Sqn	CdeG, DFM*	1 February 1917 – 30 May 1989
Lackie, William Leckie	Sgt	BR	141 Sqn		
Lafont, Henrie Gaston	Adj	Free FR	615 Sqn		Surviving aircrew
Laguna, Piotr	Flt Lt	POL	302 Sqn	VM, KW	KIA 27 June 1941
Laing, Alan	Sgt	BR	151 Sqn		
Laing, Alexander James Alan	Fg Off	BR	64 Sqn		Resigned RAF Commission in 1948
Lake, Donald Millar	Fg Off	BR	219 Sqn		KIA 4 September 1941
Lamb, Albert	Sgt	BR	25 Sqn		Died 5 January 1948
Lamb, Owen Edward	Plt Off	NZ	151 Sqn		KIA 14 April 1941
Lamb, Peter Gilbert	Fg Off	BR	610 Sqn	AFC	
Lamb, Robert Lionel	Plt Off	BR	600 Sqn		
Lamb, Roderick Russell	Sub Lt (FAA)	BR	804 NAS		KIA 24 August 1942
Lambert, Hugh Michael Standford "Mike"	Flt Lt	BR	25 Sqn		KIA 15 September 1940 when Beaufighter R2067 crashed near Biggin Hill.
Lambie, William Gavib Mein	Plt Off	BR	219 Sqn		KIA 15 November 1940
Lammer, Alfred	Plt Off	BR	141 Sqn	DFC & Bar	
Landels, Leslie Ninlan	Plt Off	BR	32 & 615 Sqns		KIA 20 January 1942
Lane, Brian John Edward "Sandy"	Flt Lt	BR	19 Sqn (CO)	DFC	Author of Spitfire!, published in 1942 under the pseudonym B.J. Ellan; one of only a few contemporaneous, autobiographical accounts of the life of a Battle of Britain Spitfire pilot. MIA 13 December 1942
Lane, Roy	Plt Off	BR	43 Sqn		KIA 20 June 1944 (by Japanese in Burma)
Langdon, Charles Edward	Plt Off	BR	43 Sqn		MIA 26 February 1941
Langham-Hobart, Neville Charles	Plt Off	BR	73 Sqn		1912–1994 As a pilot of Hawker Hurricane P2036 he was badly injured following combat with a Bf 109 on 23 September 1940 and became a member of the Guinea Pig Club.
Langley, Gerald Archibald	Plt Off	BR	41 Sqn		KIA 15 September 1940 when Spitfire P9324 was shot down in combat with Bf 109s.
Langley, Leonard	Sgt	BR	23 Sqn		Died 26 September 1953
Lanning, Francis Charles Anthony	Plt Off	BR	141 Sqn	DFC	1907–2002
Lansdell, John	Sgt	BR	607 Sqn		KIA 17 September 1940; Name also incorrectly spelt as Landsell
Lapka, Stanislaw	Plt Off	POL	302 Sqn	VM, KW**	Died 1978
Lapkowski, Waclaw	Plt Off	POL	303 Sqn	VM, KW***	KIA 2 July 1941
Larbalestier, Basil Douglas	Plt Off	BR	600 Sqn		Died 1994
Laricheliere, Joseph Emile Paul	Plt Off	CAN	213 Sqn	DFC	MIA 16 August 1940 when he failed to return in his Hurricane from combat near Portland.
Latta, John Blandford	Plt Off	CAN	242 Sqn	DFC	MIA 12 January 1941 aged 27
Lauder, Arnold John	Sgt	BR	264 Sqn		
Laughlin, John Hamilton	Fg Off	BR	235 Sqn	MBE	
Laurence, George	Sgt	BR	141 Sqn	DFM	KIA 9 November 1944
Law, K S	Plt Off	BR	605 Sqn		Refer to Kennith Schadtler-Law
Lawford, Derek Napier	Sgt	BR	247 Sqn		
Lawler, Edgar Stanley	Sgt	BR	604 Sqn		
Lawrence, John Thornett	Sgt	BR	235 Sqn	OBE, AFC	
Lawrence, Keith Ashley	Plt Off	NZ	242, 603, 234 Sqns & 421 Flt	DFC	Surviving aircrew
Lawrence, Norman Anthony	Sgt	BR	54 Sqn		Died 22 August 1958
Laws, Adrian Francis	Plt Off	BR	64 Sqn	DFM	KIA 30 September 1940
Laws, George Godfrey Stone	Sgt	BR	501 & 151 Sqns		KIA 28 March 1941 (Pilot)
Lawson, Richard Chester	Plt Off	BR	601 Sqn		KIA 10 February 1941
Lawson, Walter John	Plt Off	BR	19 Sqn		KIA 28 August 1941
Lawson-Brown, John	Plt Off	BR	64 Sqn		KIA 12 May 1941
Lawton, Philip Charles Fenner	Fg Off	BR	604 Sqn	DFC	
Laycock, Herbert Keith	Plt Off	BR	79 & 87 Sqns		KIA 18 August 1943
Lazoryk, Włodzimierz	Flt Lt	POL	607 Sqn	VM, KW**	
Leary, David Cooper	Plt Off	BR	17 Sqn		KIA 18 December 1940
Leatham, Ernest George Cuthbert	Plt Off	BR	248 Sqn	DFC	
Leathart, James Anthony "The Prof"	Sqn Ldr	BR	54 Sqn	DSO	Died 1998; retired from RAF in 1962 at the rank of Air Cdre
Leather, William Johnson	Flt Lt	BR	611 Sqn		
Le Cheminant, Jerrold	Sgt	BR	616 Sqn	DFC	
Leckrone, Philip Howard	Plt Off	AME	616 Sqn		KIFA 5 January 1941 (practice flight)
Lecky, John Gage	Plt Off	BR	610 & 41 Sqns		KIA 11 October 1940
Le Conte, Edgar Francis	Sgt	BR	FIU	OBE	Died 4 May 1981
Ledger, Leslie	Sgt	BR	236 Sqn		
Le Dong, Terry	Sgt	BR	219 Sqn		KIA 8 February 1941 (Wireless Operator)
Lee, Kenneth Norman Thomas "Hawkeye"	Fg Off	BR	501 Sqn	DFC	Died 15 January 2008
Lee, Maurice Alexander William	Sgt	BR	72 Sqn & 421 Flt		KIA 31 December 1940 (Pilot)
Lee, Richard Hugh Antony	Flt Lt	BR	85 Sqn	DSO, DFC	MIA 18 August 1940 when he was last seen in his Hurricane P2923 chasing an enemy formation of the east coast.
Lees, Alan Farquhar Young	Flt Lt	BR	236 Sqn	DSO, DFC	Died 27 October 1987
Lees, Ronald Beresford	Sqn Ldr	AUS	72 Sqn	CB, CBE, DFC*, MID**, LoM(Cdr)(US)	Later CO RAF Coltishall (9 January 1941 – 11 September 1942); Died 18 May 1991; Retired from RAF with the rank of Air Marshal
Lefevre, Peter William	Plt Off	BR	46 Sqn		MIA 6 February 1944
Legg, Richard James	Plt Off	BR	601 Sqn		Died 1959
Legge, Brian Pauncefoote	Plt Off	BR	601 Sqn	DFC	
Leggett, Percival Graham	Plt Off	BR	245 Sqn		Surviving aircrew
Leigh, Arthur Charles	Sgt	BR	64 & 72 Sqns	DFM	
Leigh, Rupert Henry Archibald	Sqn Ldr	BR	66 Sqn (CO)		
Le Jeune, O G	Sgt	BEL	235 Sqn		Died 10 April 1947
Lenahan, John Desmond	Plt Off	BR	607 Sqn		KIA 9 September 1940 when his Hurricane P3177 crashed following combat with Do 17s and Bf 109s near Mayfield.
Leng, Maurice Equity	Sgt	BR	73 Sqn		Shot down, captured & made POW 30 September 1942
Lennard, Paul Lennard	Mid (FAA)	BR	501 Sqn		KIA 26 March 1942
Lenton, Edwin Claude	Plt Off	BR	56 Sqn		
Le Rougetel, Stanley	Fg Off	BR	600 Sqn		
Le Roy Du Vivier, Daniel Albert Raymond Georges	Plt Off	BEL	43 Sqn		Died 2 September 1981
Lerway, Frederick Thomas	Sgt	BR	236 Sqn		
Leslie, George Mennie	Sgt	BR	219 Sqn		KIA 17 December 1940 (Wireless Operator)
Levenson, Stephen Austin	Sgt	BR	611 Sqn		KIA 17 September 1942 (Pilot)
Lewis, Albert Gerald "Zulu"	Plt Off	SA	85 & 249 Sqns	DFC*	
Lewis, Charles Sydney	Sgt	BR	600 Sqn		Died 1954
Lewis, Raymond Grant	Plt Off	CAN	401 Sqn		MIA 5 February 1941
Lewis, William George	Sgt	BR	25 Sqn		KIA 14 July 1941
Leyland, Reginald Harry	Sgt	BR	FIU		KIA 23 October 1942
Lilley, Robert	Sgt	BR	29 Sqn	DFC	KIA 28 April 1944 (Wireless Operator/Navigator)
Lillie, P	Sgt	BR	264 Sqn		
Limpenny, Eric Ronald	Sgt	BR	64 Sqn		
Lindsay, Alec Ian	Plt Off	BR	72 Sqn		KIA 23 October 1943
Lindsey, Patrick Chaloner	Fg Off	BR	601 Sqn		KIA 26 July 1940 when he was shot down in the channel in Hurricane P2753.
Lines, Arthur Peter	Fg Off	BR	17 Sqn		
Lingard, John Granville	Plt Off	BR	25 Sqn	DFC	
Linney, Anthony Stuart	Plt Off	BR	229 Sqn	OBE	Died 1983
Lipscombe, Alfred John	Sgt	BR	600 Sqn		KIA 20 September 1941 (Wireless Operator/Air Gunner)
Lister, Robert Charles Franklin	Sqn Ldr	BR	41 (CO) & 92 Sqns	DFC	Died March 1998
Litchfield, Peter	Plt Off	BR	610 Sqn		MIA 18 July 1940 when Spitfire P9452 was shot down in combat just north of Calais.
Litson, Frederick William Ronald	Sgt	BR	141 Sqn	DFC	
Little, Arthur Guthrie	Plt Off	BR	235 Sqn		
Little, Bernard Williamson	Fg Off	BR	609 Sqn	OBE	Died 1986
Little, James Hayward	Flt Lt	BR	219 Sqn (CO)	DFC	KIA 12 June 1943
Little, Ronald	Sgt	BR	238 Sqn		MIA 28 September 1940 when Hurricane N2400 crashed into the sea after being shot down by Bf 109s over the Isle of Wight.
Little, Thomas Burgess	Fg Off	CAN	401 Sqn		MIA 27 August 1941
Llewellin, Arthur John Alexander	Fg Off	BR	29 Sqn		KIA 7 February 1942
Llewellyn, Reginald Thomas	Sgt	BR	213 Sqn	DFM	
Lloyd, ?	AC	BR	29 Sqn		Flew only 1 operational sortie
Lloyd, David Edward	Sgt	BR	19 & 64 Sqns		KIA 17 March 1942
Lloyd, John Phillip	Plt Off	BR	72 & 64 Sqns		
Lloyd, Philip David	Sgt	BR	41 Sqn		KIA 15 October 1940 when his Spitfire X4178 was shot down in a surprise attack by Hptmn Fözö of 4/JG51.
Lochnan, Peter William	Fg Off	CAN	1 Sqn RCAF		KIFA 21 May 1941
Lock, Erick Stanley "Sawn Off Lockie"	Plt Off	BR	41 Sqn	DSO, DFC*, MiD	MIA 3 August 1941
Lockhart, James	Plt Off	BR	85 & 213 Sqns		KIA 5 April 1942
Lockton, Eric Edward	Sgt	BR	236 Sqn		MIA 20 July 1940 when Blenheim L1300 was shot down into the sea off Cherbourg.
Lockwood, Joseph Charles	Sgt	BR	54 Sqn		KIA 3 March 1941
Lofts, Keith Temple	Plt Off	BR	615 & 249 Sqns		KIFA 20 May 1951
Logan, Colin	Plt Off	BR	266 Sqn		KIA 27 March 1941
Logie, Ormonde Arthur	Plt Off	BR	29 Sqn		{1909–1989)
Lokuciewski, Witold "Tolo"	Plt Off	POL	303 Sqn	VM, KW**, PR, DFC, CdeG	Died 17 April 1990 in Warsaw
Long, ?	Sgt	BR	236 Sqn		Service details unknown
Lonsdale, John	Plt Off	BR	3 Sqn		KIA 26 November 1942
Lonsdale, Robert Henry	Sgt	BR	242 & 501 Sqns		
Looker, David John	Plt Off	BR	615 Sqn		
Loudon, Malcolm John	Flt Lt	BR	141 Sqn	DFC	
Lovell, Anthony Desmond Joseph	Plt Off	BR	41 Sqn	DSO*, DFC*, DFC (US)	KIA 17 August 1945
Lovell-Gregg, Terence Gunion	Sqn Ldr	NZ	87 Sqn		KIA 15 August 1940 when his Hurricane P3215 crashed near Abbotsbury after being shot down by enemy fighters over Portland.
Loverseed, John Eric	Sgt	BR	501 Sqn	AFC	Died 1962
Lovett, Reginald Eric	Flt Lt	BR	73 Sqn	DFC	KIA 7 September 1940
Lowe, Joseph	Sgt	BR	236 Sqn		Died 1973
Loweth, Philip Anthony	Plt Off	BR	249 Sqn		
Lowther, Walter	Sgt	BR	219 Sqn		
Loxton, Wilfred William "Bill"	Sqn Ldr	BR	25 Sqn (CO)		Died 15 November 1992
Lucas, Robin Morton McTaggart Delight	Plt Off	BR	141 Sqn		Surviving aircrew
Lucas, Sidney Edward	Sgt	BR	32 & 257 Sqns		
Lukaszewicz, Kazimierz	Fg Off	POL	501 Sqn	KW	MIA 12 August 1940
Lumsden, Dugald Thomas Moore	Plt Off	BR	236 Sqn		
Lumsden, John Clapperton	Sgt	BR	248 Sqn		
Lund, John Wilfred	Plt Off	BR	611 & 92 Sqns		KIA 2 October 1941
Lusk, Harold Stewart	Plt Off	NZ	25 Sqn		
Lusty, Kenneth Roy	Sgt	BR	25 Sqn		Died 18 September 2009
Lyall, Alastair McLaren	Flt Lt	BR	25 Sqn		
Lyall, Archibald "Pat"	Plt Off	BR	602 Sqn		KIA 28 November 1940
Lynch, James	AC	BR	25 Sqn		MIA 22 January 1944
Lyons, Emanuel Barrett	Plt Off	BR	65 Sqn	DFC	
Lysek, Antoni	Sgt	POL	302 Sqn	KW	MIA 5 July 1942

== M ==
Name	Rank	Nationality	Sqn during Battle	Awards	Notes
McAdam, John	Sgt	BR	41 Sqn		Born Gillingham, Kent, 21 March 1919; KIA 20 February 1941, buried in Island Magee (Ballyharry) Cemetery, County Antrim
McAdam, William David	Sgt	BR	23 Sqn		KIA 1 September 1941
McAllister, P J	AC	BR	23 & 29 Sqns		
MacArthur, Malcolm Robert	Fg Off	BR	236 Sqn	DFC	
McArthur, James Henry Gordon	Flt Lt	BR	238; 609 Sqns		KIFA May 1961.
McAvity, George Fellows	Fg Off	CAN	3 Sqn		KIFA 19 October 1940
McCann, Thomas Andrew	Sgt	BR	601 Sqn		KIA 27 July 1942 (El Alamein, North Africa)
McCarthy, James Patrick	Sgt	BR	235 Sqn		
McCarthy, Thomas Francis	Sgt	BR	235 Sqn		MIA 6 October 1942
McCaul, John Patrick	AC2	BR	219 Sqn		KIA 30 September 1940
McCaw, Derek Charles	Fg Off	BR	238 Sqn		KIA 8 August 1940
McChesney, Robert Ian	Sgt	NZ	236 Sqn		KIA 6 December 1942
McClintock, John Arthur Peter	Plt Off	BR	615 Sqn		KIFA 25 November 1940
McColl, John B	Plt Off	CAN	615 & 607 Sqns		
McComb, James Ellis	Sqn Ldr	BR	611 Sqn (CO)	DFC	Died August 1982
McConnell, John	Sgt	BR	145 Sqn		Died 1965
McConnell, William Winder	Plt Off	IRE	607; 245; 249	DFC	
McCormack, John Bernard	Sgt	BR (Note: parents given as Irish)	25 Sqn		MIA 10 September 1942
McDermott, John Alexander	Sgt	NZ	23 Sqn		Died 2 January 1970
MacDonald, Alexander Stewart	Sgt	BR	601 Sqn		
MacDonald, Donald Kennedy	Plt Off	BR	603 Sqn		MIA 28 August 1940; Brother of Harold Kennedy MacDonald←
MacDonald, Duncan Stuart	Flt Lt	BR	213 Sqn	DSO, DFC	
MacDonald, Harold Kennedy	Flt Lt	BR	603 Sqn		KIA 28 September 1940; Brother of Donald Kennedy MacDonald←
MacDonell, Aeness Ranald Donald	Sqn Ldr	BR	64 Sqn (CO)	DFC	
McDonough, Bryan Martin	Plt Off	AUS	236 Sqn		MIA 1 August 1940
MacDougal, Charles White	Sgt	BR	111 Sqn		KIA 5 March 1941 (Malta)
MacDougall, Ian Neil	Plt Off	BR	141 Sqn	DFC	Died August 1987
MacDougall, Ralph Ian George	Sqn Ldr	BR	17 Sqn		
McDougall, Roy	Plt Off	BR	3; 232 Sqns		
McDowall, Andrew	Sgt	BR	602 Sqn	DFM	Died 1981
McFadden, Aubrey	Plt Off	BR	73 Sqn		MIA 5 April 1942 (Singapore)
McFie, Colin Hamilton	Plt Off	BR	611 & 616 Sqns	DFC	
McGaw, Charles Alexander	Plt Off	AUS	73; 66 Sqns		KIA 1 October 1943
McGibbon, James	Plt Off	BR	615 Sqn		KIA 29 September 1940
McGlashan, Kenneth Butterworth	Plt Off	BR	245 Sqn	AFC	
McGowan, Roy Andrew	Plt Off	BR	46 Sqn		Died 20 March 2012
McGowan, Robert Henry	Plt Off	BR	92 Sqn		KIA 22 December 1944
McGrath, John Keswick Ulick Blake	Plt Off	BR	601 Sqn	DFC	
MacGregor, Alexander Noel	Sgt	BR	19 Sqn		
McGregor, Alan James	Plt Off	BR	504 Sqn	DSO	
McGregor, Gordon Roy	Flt Lt	CAN	1 RCAF	OBE, DFC, CdeG, MiD**	
McGregor, Hector Douglas	Sqn Ldr	NZ	213 Sqn	KCB, CBE, DSO	Died 11 April 1973; Retired from RAF with the rank of Air Marshal.
McGregor, Peter Reginald	Plt Off	BR	46 Sqn		
McGugan, Robert	Sgt	BR	141 Sqn		
McHardy, Donald Ballantine Hardy	Fg Off	BR	229 Sqn		POW 26 October 1940
McHardy, Eric Hartgill	Plt Off	NZ	248 Sqn	DSO, DFC	
McInnes, Archie	Plt Off	BR	601 & 238 Sqns		Died 31 July 2019
McIntosh, Peter Roy Charles	Sgt	BR	151 & 605 Sqns		KIA 12 October 1940
McIntyre, Athol Gordon	Plt Off	NZ	111 Sqn		
McKay, Donald Alastair Stewart	Sgt	BR	501 Sqn & 421 Flt	DFM	1917–1959
McKellar, Archibald Ashmore	Flt Lt	BR	605 Sqn	DSO, DFC*	KIA 1 November 1940
MacKenzie, Duncan Cameron	Plt Off	CAN	56 Sqn		KIA 11 June 1943
MacKenzie, John Noble	Plt Off	NZ	41 Sqn	DFC	Retired December 1957 retaining Sqn Ldr; died May 1993
Mackenzie, Kenneth William	Plt Off	BR	43 & 501 Sqns	DFC, AFC, AE	Died 4 June 2009
MacKinnon, Adam McLeod	Lt (FAA)	BR	804 NAS		
MacKinnon, Donald Duncan	Sgt	BR	236 Sqn		KIA 18 July 1940
McKnight, William Lidstone "Willie"	Plt Off	CAN	242 Sqn	DFC*	MIA 12 January 1941
MacLachlan, Alan Moncrieff	Sqn Ldr	BR	92 Sqn		
MacLachlan, James Archibald Findlay	Flt Lt	BR	145 & 73 Sqns	DSO, DFC**	Became well known for flying with a prosthetic arm. Died while POW 31 July 1943
MacLachlan, James Robert	Sqn Ldr	CAN	46 Sqn (CO)		
MacLaren, Archibald Colin	Plt Off	BR	604 Sqn		
McLaughlin, John William	Sgt	BR	238 Sqn		Died 16 June 2001.
MacLean, Charles Hector	Plt Off	BR	604 Sqn	AE*	Died 19 July 2007
McLean, Robert James	Sqn Ldr	CAN	400 Sqn		Died 20 October 2007
McLure, Andrew Crawford Rankin	Plt Off	BR	87 Sqn		KIA 20 July 1942
McMahon, John Reginald	Sgt	BR	235 Sqn		
McMullen, Desmond Annesley Peter	Fg Off	BR	54 & 222 Sqns	DFC	
McNab, Ernest Archibald	Sqn Ldr	CAN	1 Sqn RCAF (CO)	OBE, DFC, CD	
McNair, Robin John	Sqn Ldr	BR	3 Sqn, 249 Sqn, 87 Sqn, 247 Sqn, 124 Wing & 74 Sqn	DFC	
McNay, Alexander Logan	Sgt	BR	73 Sqn		MIA 5 September 1940
Macnamara, Brian Radley	Fg Off	BR	603 Sqn	DSO	
MacOnochie, Alfred Rippon Duke	Sgt	BR	235 Sqn		
MacPhail, Frederick John	Fg Off	BR	603 Sqn		
McPhee, Thomas	Sqn Ldr	BR	151 & 249 Sqns	DFC, DFM	Died 22 February 2009
MacPherson, Robert Reid	FSgt	BR	65 Sqn		KIA 13 October 1941
MacRae, Ian Nicholson	Sgt	BR	FIU		
MacRory, Harry Ian	Sgt	BR	23 Sqn		KIA 3 January 1941
Macháček, Jiří	Plt Off	CZ	310 & 145 Sqns		KIA 8 July 1941
Machin, William Howard	Sgt	BR	264 Sqn		KIA 24 August 1940
Maciejowski, Michał K	Sgt	POL	111 & 249 Sqns	VM, KW***, DFC, DFM	
Macinski, Janusz	Plt Off	POL	111 Sqn	KW	MIA 4 September 1940
Madle, Sydney James	Plt Off	BR	615 & 605 Sqns		
Maffett, Gerald Hamilton	Plt Off	BR	257 Sqn		KIA 31 August 1940
Maggs, Mervyn Henry	Plt Off	BR	264 Sqn		Died November 1987
Maguire, Harold John	Sqn Ldr	BR	229 Sqn (CO)	DSO	
Mahoney, Timothy Joseph	PO (FAA)	BR	804 NAS		Died 1 August 1977
Main, Alistair David Williams	Sgt	BR	249 Sqn		KIA 16 July 1940
Main, Hedley Ronald	Sgt	BR	25 Sqn		KIA 27 August 1941
Maitland-Walker, Wilford Hugh	Flt Lt	BR	65 Sqn		Died 1969
Makins, Arthur Edward	FSgt	BR	247 Sqn		Died Sep 2000 Lerwick Born Thetford, Norfolk 1915; Commissioned December 1941
Malan, Adolph "Sailor"	Flt Lt	SA	74 Sqn (CO)	DSO*, DFC	Died 17 September 1963
Malengreau, Roger Fernand Fulgeance Ghislaine	Plt Off	BEL	87 Sqn	CdeG, CBE	Died May 1996
Males, Ernest Edward	Plt Off	BR	72 Sqn		KIA 27 September 1940
Malinowski, Bronislaw	Sgt	POL	43 Sqn	VM, KW***, DFC	Died May 1982
Malinski, Jan L	Plt Off	POL	302 Sqn	KW***	
Mallett, Ronald Spencer	Sgt	BR	Sqn	DFC	KIA 28 June 1944
Malý, Jaroslav	Plt Off	CZ	310 Sqn		KIA 5 June 1941
Mamedoff, Andrew B "Andy"	Plt Off	AME	609 Sqn		KIA 8 October 1941
Manger, Kenneth	Plt Off	BR	17 Sqn	DFC	MIA 11 August 1940
Mann, Harold John	Plt Off	BR	1 Sqn		
Mann, Jackie	Sgt	BR	64 & 92 Sqns		Died 12 November 1995
Mansel-Lewis, John	Plt Off	BR	92 Sqn		KIA 4 April 1941
Mansfeld, Miroslav Jan	Sgt	CZ	111 Sqn	DFC, DSO, AFC	Died October 1991
Mansfield, Bernard Martin	Sgt	BR	236 Sqn		KIA 25 February 1941
Mansfield, David Ernest	Sgt	BR	236 Sqn		
Manton, Edward	Sgt	BR	610 Sqn		KIA 29 August 1940
Manton, Graham Ashley Leonard	Sqn Ldr	BR	56 Sqn		
Marchand, Roy Achille	Plt Off	BR	73 Sqn		KIA 15 September 1940
Marcinkowski, Mieczysław S	Sgt	POL	151 & 501 Sqn		MIA 1 November 1940
Marek, František	Sgt	CZ	310 & 19 Sqns		KIA 14 September 1940
Markiewicz, Antoni L	Sgt	POL	302 Sqn	KW**	
Marland, Rainford Gent	Sgt	BR	222 Sqn	MiD**	KIA 16 December 1941
Marples, Roy	Fg Off	BR	616 Sqn	DFC*	Born Muswell Hill, 22 January 1920; KIA 26 April 1944 near Horsham, Sussex, while Wg Cdr Flying of 145 Wing RAF
Marrs, Eric Simcox	Plt Off	BR	152 Sqn	DFC	KIA 24 July 1941
Marsh, Alan Edward	Lt (FAA)	BR	804 NAS		
Marsh, Edward Howard	Sgt	BR	152 Sqn		
Marsh, Henry James	Sgt	BR	238 Sqn		MIA 13 August 1940
Marsh, William Charles	Sgt	BR	236 Sqn		
Marshall, Alfred Ernest	Sgt	BR	73 Sqn	DFC, DFM	KIFA 27 November 1944
Marshall, James Eglington	Fg Off	BR	85 Sqn	DFC	KIA 18 April 1942
Marshall, John Victor	Plt Off	BR	232 Sqn	DFC	Died 24 June 1984
Marshall, Thomas Brian	Sgt	BR	235 Sqn	DFC	
Marshall, Thomas Robson	Sgt	BR	219 Sqn		KIA 29 June 1941
Marsland, Guy	Plt Off	BR	245 & 253 Sqns		Died 1983
Marston, Kenneth John	Plt Off	BR	56 Sqn		KIA 14 December 1940
Martel, Ludwik	Plt Off	POL	54 & 603 Sqns	VM, KW**	Died 25 April 2010
Martin, A	Sgt	BR	264 Sqn		Service details unknown
Martin, Alan William	Plt Off	BR	235 Sqn	DFC	
Martin, John Claverley	Fg Off	NZ	257 Sqn		MIA 27 August 1941
Martin, Richard Maurice Scott	Sub Lt (FAA)	BR	808 NAS		KIA 27 November 1940
Maslen, Thomas Arthur	Sgt	BR	235 Sqn		KIA 25 October 1941
Mason, William	Sgt	BR	235 Sqn		KIA 15 February 1941
Massey, Kenneth	Sgt	BR	248 Sqn		
Mather, John Romney	Plt Off	BR	66 Sqn		KIA 27 October 1940
Mathers, James W	AC2	BR	29 & 23 Sqns		
Matheson, Geoffrey Charles	Flt Lt	BR	222 Sqn		KIA 24 August 1943
Mathews, Kenneth	Plt Off	BR	23 Sqn		KIA 20 October 1943
Matthews, Henry George	Sgt	BR	236 Sqn	DFM	
Matthews, Henry Key Fielding	Fg Off	BR	54 & 603 Sqns		KIA 7 October 1940
Matthews, Ian Walter	Sgt	BR	64 Sqn		KIA 1 September 1942
Matthews, Peter Gerald Hugh	Fg Off	BR	1 Sqn	DFC	
Maxwell, David Alexander	Plt Off	BR	611 & 603 Sqns		KIA 14 February 1941
Maxwell, Hugh Lockhart	Sqn Ldr	BR	600 Sqn (CO)		
Maxwell, Walter	Sgt	BR	264 Sqn		MIA 26 August 1940
May, Leonard Dawson	Sgt	BR	601 Sqn		MIA 25 October 1940
Mayers, Howard Clive	Plt Off	AUS	601 Sqn	DFC*, DSO	MIA 20 July 1942
Mayhew, Paul Francis	Fg Off	BR	79 Sqn		KIA 19 February 1942
Mayne, Ernest	WO	BR	74 Sqn	AFC	Died 21 March 1978
Meaker, James Reginald Bryan	Plt Off	BR	249 Sqn	DFC	KIA 27 September 1940
Meares, Stanley Thomas	Flt Lt	BR	54 Sqn	DFC	KIA 15 November 1941
Measures, William Edward Geoffrey	Flt Lt	BR	74 & 238 Sqns	AFC	
Medworth, John Charles Oswald	Sgt	BR	25 Sqn		
Meeson, Charles Victor	Sgt	BR	56 Sqn		KIA 20 September 1940
Melville, James Cosmo	Plt Off	BR	264 Sqn		Surviving aircrew
Melville-Jackson, George Holmes	Plt Off	BR	236 Sqn	DFC	Died 9 March 2009
Menage, Thomas Nathan	Sgt	BR	29 Sqn		KIA 10 May 1941
Mercer, Robert Turner Deighton	Sgt	BR	609 Sqn		KIA 9 May 1941
Merchant, Henry James	Sgt	BR	1 Sqn		
Meredith, Arthur Douglas	Sgt	BR	242 & 141 Sqns		
Mermagen, Herbert W "Tubby"	Sqn Ldr	BR	266 & 222 Sqns (CO)	OBE, CBE, CB, CdeLd'H	Died 1997
Merrett, John Charles	Sgt	BR	235 Sqn	AE	Died approx March 2010
Merrick, Claude	Plt Off	BR	610 Sqn	DFC	Died 1984
Merryweather, Sidney William	Sgt	BR	229 Sqn	DFM	MIA 5 June 1942
Mesner, Bertram William	Sgt	BR	248 Sqn		MIA 13 September 1940
Metcalfe, Arthur Charles	Sgt	BR	604 Sqn		
Metham, James	Sgt	BR	253 Sqn		KIA 1 September 1942
Meyer, Reginald Henry Rome	Sgt	BR	236 Sqn		KIA 9 February 1944 (Greece)
Michail, ?	Sgt	BR	501 Sqn		
Michiels, Albert Charles Antoine	Sgt	BEL	235 Sqn		KIA 16 July 1944
Middlemiss, William	Sgt	BR	235 Sqn		
Middleton, William Arthur	Plt Off	NZ	266 Sqn		MIA 27 August 1941 (Dunkirk)
Mierzwa, Boguslaw	Plt Off	POL	303 Sqn	KW	KIA 16 April 1941
Miksa, Wlodzimierz	Plt Off	POL	303 Sqn	VM, KW**, DFC	After war changed name to Pilkington-Miksa
Milburn, Reginald Alan	Sgt	BR	601 Sqn		Died 19 December 1983
Milren, Peter Raymond	Plt Off	BR	54 & 66 Sqns		KIA 11 February 1941
Mileham, Denys Edgar "Den"	Plt Off	BR	41 Sqn		Born Bromley, Kent 13 December 1920; Commissioned February 1940; KIA 15 April 1942 whilst serving with 234 Sqn, aged 22
Miles, Ernest Edwin	Sgt	BR	236 Sqn		
Miles, Stanley Fredrick	Sgt	BR	23 Sqn		
Miley, Miles John	Fg Off	BR	25 Sqn		KIA 15 September 1940
Millard, Jocelyn George Power "Joce"	Plt Off	BR	1 & 242 Sqns	AE	Died 10 May 2010
Miller, Arthur Charles	Sgt	BR	604 Sqn	DFC	
Miller, Anthony Garforth	Sqn Ldr	BR	FIU & 17 Sqn (CO)	DFC	
Miller, Alfred John	AC2	BR	23 Sqn		
Miller, Roger Freeman Garland	Plt Off	BR	609 Sqn		KIA 27 September 1940 (Flying Spitfire X4107 it exploded when he collided with a Bf 110 over Chesilbourne, Dorset.)
Miller, Robert	Flt Lt	BR	3 Sqn		KIA 24 April 1942
Miller, Thomas Henry	Sgt	BR	25 Sqn		KIA 17 December 1942
Millington, William Henry	Plt Off	AUS	79 & 249 Sqns	DFC	MIA 30 October 1940
Millist, Kenneth Milton	Plt Off	BR	73 & 615 Sqns	DFC	KIA 7 April 1941 (El Alamein)
Mills, Jack Baillie	AC1	BR	23 Sqn		
Mills, Jack Percival	Sgt	BR	43 & 249 Sqns		
Mills, Randolph Stuart	Flt Lt	BR	87 Sqn (CO)	DFC	
Mills-Smith, Frank	Sgt	BR	601 Sqn		MIA 25 October 1940
Milne, John Archibald	Plt Off	CAN	605 Sqn		
Milne, Richard Maxwell	Fg Off	BR	151 Sqn	DFC	
Milnes, Ambrose Henry	Sgt	BR	32 Sqn		
Mitchell, George	Sgt	BR	23 Sqn		Died 1969
Mitchell, Gordon Thomas Manners	Plt Off	BR	609 Sqn		KIA 11 July 1940
Mitchell, Harry Thorpe	Plt Off	CAN	87 Sqn	DFC	
Mitchell, Henry Maynard	Sqn Ldr	BR	25 Sqn	DFC	Died 12 April 2004
Mitchell, Herbert Robert	Sgt (RNZAF)	NZ	3 Sqn		Born Deep Creek, near Havelock, New Zealand 13 March 1917; Commissioned January 1942; MIA 12 May 1942 whilst serving with 603 Sqn in Malta, aged 25. Remembered on the Malta Memorial
Mitchell, Lancelot Robert George	Fg Off	BR	257 Sqn		MIA 7 September 1940
Mitchell, Peter	Sgt	BR	65 Sqn		KIA 16 July 1942 (Calcutta)
Mitchell, Philip Henry Gurrey	Fg Off	BR	266 Sqn		
Mitchell, Richard Ronald	Sgt	BR	Sqn	MBE, DFC	
Moberly, George Edward	Fg Off	BR	616 Sqn		KIA 26 August 1940
Molson, Hartland de Montarville	Fg Off (RCAF)	CAN	1 Sqn RCAF	OBE, OC	Died September 2002
Monk, Denis Aubrey	Sgt	BR	236 Sqn		
Monk, Ernest William John	Plt Off	BR	25 Sqn		KIA 21 November 1940
Montagu, George Wroughton	Sqn Ldr	BR	236 Sqn (CO)		KIA 12 December 1940
Montague-Smith, Arthur M	Flt Lt	BR	264 Sqn	DL	Surviving aircrew (born 1915)
Montgomery, Cecil Robert	Plt Off	BR	615 Sqn		KIA 14 August 1940
Montgomery, Herbert Francis	Sgt	BR	43 Sqn		KIA 14 August 1940
Moody, Dennis George	Sgt	BR	604 Sqn		
Moody, Henry Wollaston	Plt Off	BR	602 Sqn		MIA 7 September 1940
Moore, Arthur Robert	Sgt	BR	245 & 3 Sqns	DFC	Died 1989
Moore, Peter John	Sgt	AUS	253 Sqn		KIA 3 June 1942
Moore, William Roy	Plt Off	BR	264 Sqn		Died 1984
Moore, William Storey	Fg Off	AUS	236 Sqn		KIA 24 December 1943
More, James Winter Carmichael	Sqn Ldr	BR	73 Sqn	DFC	POW 12 September 1944 (Japan)
Morewood, Roger Edward Guy	Flt Lt	BR	248 Sqn		Died December 2014
Morfill, Percy Frederick	FSgt	BR	501 Sqn	DFM	1914–2004
Morgan, Peter Jacques	Plt Off	BR	238 Sqn		1919–1977
Morgan, Thomas Frederick Dalton	Flt Lt	BR	43 Sqn	DSO, DFC	Left the RAF as a Group Captain in 1952 1917–2004
Morgan-Gray, Hugh		BR	46 Sqn		KIA 22 February 1941
Morris, Edward James	Plt Off	SA	79 Sqn	DSO, DFC	
Morris, Geoffrey Edward	Plt Off	BR	FIU		
Morris, John	Plt Off	BR	248 Sqn		
Morrison, Joseph Pearson	Sgt	BR	17 & 46 Sqns		KIA 22 October 1940
Morrison, Neil	Sgt	BR	54, 72 & 74 Sqns		KIA 24 February 1941
Morrough-Ryan, Oliver Bertram "Buck"	Plt Off	BR	41 Sqn		Born Co. Meath, Ireland 1919; KIA 26 July 1941 with 68 Sqn
Mortimer, Percival Alexander	Plt Off	BR	85 & 257 Sqns		KIA 6 November 1942
Mortimer-Rose, Edward Brian	Plt Off	BR	234 Sqn	DFC*	KIA 25 January 1943 (Tunisia)
Morton, James Storrs	Fg Off	BR	603 Sqn	DFC	1916–1982
Moss, Raymond Christopher	Sgt	BR	29 Sqn		
Moss, William James March	Sub Lt (FAA)	BR	213 Sqn		MIA 27 August 1940; ARAeS
Mott, Walter Henry	Sgt	BR	141 Sqn		
Mottram, Roy	Plt Off	BR	92 Sqn		KIA 31 August 1941
Mouchotte, Rene G O J	Adj	Free FR	245 & 615 Sqns	CdeG, DFC, CdeL, CdeLd'H	KIA 27 August 1943
Mould, Edward Anthony "Tony"	Sgt	BR	74 Sqn		KIA 20 January 1943
Moulton, Eric Walter	Sgt	BR	600 Sqn		
Mounsdon, Maurice Hewlett	Plt Off	BR	56 Sqn		1918–2019
Mount, Christopher John	Flt Lt	BR	602 Sqn	DSO, DFC	23 July 2002
Mowat, Noel Joseph	Fg Off (RNAF)	NZ	245 Sqn	DSO, MiD	KIA 7 November 1946
Mowat, Robert Innes	Sgt	BR	248 Sqn		
Moyham, Harold Frederick John	Sgt	BR	248 Sqn		KIA 3 November 1940
Mrázek, Karel	Plt Off	CZ	46 Sqn		
Muchowski, Konrad Antoni	Sgt	POL	85 & 501 Sqn		Died 1988
Mudie, Michael Robert	Plt Off	BR	615 Sqn		KIA 14 July 1940
Mudry, Wlodzimierz	Sgt	POL	79 Sqn		
Muirhead, Ian James	Plt Off	BR	605 Sqn	DFC	KIA 15 October 1940
Mumler, Mieczyslaw	Sqn Ldr	POL	302 Sqn (CO)	VM, KW*, CBE, DFC	Died 1985
Mungo-Park, John Colin	Flt Lt	BR	74 Sqn	DFC*	KIA 27 June 1941
Munn, Wellesley Spencer	FSgt	BR	29 Sqn	DFM	Died 1982
Munro, John Gray	Sqn Ldr	BR	263 Sqn		
Murch, Leonard Charles	Plt Off	BR	253 Sqn		Died of polio 16 September 1943 (Libya)
Murland, William John	Sgt	NZ	264 Sqn		Died 15 November 1978
Murray, Alan Duncan	Sqn Ldr	BR	46, 501 & 73 Sqns	DFC	
Murray, James	Sgt	BR	610 & 74 Sqns		KIA 3 April 1943 (El Alamein)
Murray, Patrick Hatton	Sgt	BR	73 Sqn		KIA 8 December 1942 (Kiel)
Murray, Thomas Burnley	Plt Off	BR	616 Sqn	AFC	Died 1984

== N ==
Name	Rank	Nationality	Sqn during Battle	Decorations	Notes
Naish, Kenneth Edward	Sgt	BR	235 Sqn	DFC	
Narucki, Aleksander Ryszard	Plt Off	POL	607 Sqn		KIA 11 May 1941
Naughtin, Harold Thomas	Sgt	BR	235 Sqn		MIA 28 May 1941
Neil, Thomas Francis "Ginger"	Plt Off	BR	249 Sqn	DFC, AFC, AE	Died 11 July 2018
Nelson, Dick	Flt Sgt	BR	235 Sqn		Died 26 June 1972
Nelson, William Henry	Fg Off	AME	74 Sqn	DFC	MIA 1 November 1940
Nelson-Edwards, George Hassall	Plt Off	BR	79 Sqn	DFC	
Nesbitt, Arthur Deane	Fg Off	CAN	1 Sqn RCAF	OBE, DFC, CdeG	Died 22 February 1978
Neville, William John	Sgt	BR	610 Sqn		KIA 11 August 1940
Newbury, John Charles	Plt Off	BR	609 Sqn		
Newbury, M A	Plt Off	BR	145 Sqn		KIA during the Battle of Britain, but date unknown
Newham, Edward Arnold	Sgt	BR	235 Sqn		
Newling, Michael Alan	Plt Off	BR	145 Sqn	DFC	KIA 6 July 1941
Newport, Douglas Victor	Sgt	BR	235 Sqn		
Newton, Edwin Frank	Sgt	BR	29 Sqn		
Newton, Harry Snow	Sgt	BR	111 Sqn	AFC	
Nicholas, John Beville Howard	Fg Off	BR	65 Sqn		
Nicholls, Douglas Benjamin Fletcher	Sgt	BR	87, 242 & 151 Sqns	DFC	Surviving aircrew
Nicholls, Thomas George Frank	Sgt	BR	23 Sqn		KIA 10 April 1941 (Air Gunner)
Nichols, Dennis Hugh	Sgt	BR	56 Sqn		Died 23 August 2001
Nicolson, James Brindley	Flt Lt	BR	249 Sqn	VC, DFC	MIA 2 May 1945 (in Singapore)
Nicolson, Peter Bethune	Sgt	BR	232 Sqn		KIA 29 May 1941 (in North Africa)
Niemiec, Pawel	Fg Off	POL	17 Sqn	VM, KW**	
Nightingale, Frederick George	Plt Off	BR	219 Sqn		KIA 17 December 1940
Niven, Hugh Glen	Plt Off	CAN	601 & 602 Sqns		Died 8 April 2008
Nixon, William	AC	BR	23 Sqn		KIA 30 August 1944 (in Germany) (Pilot)
Noble, Brian Robert	Plt Off	BR	79 Sqn		
Noble, Dennis	Sgt	BR	43 Sqn		KIA 30 August 1940 (Pilot)
Noble, William John	Sgt	BR	54 Sqn		Died 1979
Nokes-Cooper, Benjamin	Fg Off	BR	236 Sqn		KIA 1 August 1940 (Air Gunner)
Norfolk, Norman Robert	Plt Off	BR	72 Sqn	DFC	
Norris, Philip Purchell	Sgt	BR	213 Sqn		KIA 13 August 1940 (Pilot)
Norris, Robert Wilson C	Fg Off	CAN	401 Sqn		
Norris, Stanley Charles	Flt Lt	BR	610 Sqn	DFC	
North, Gerald	Plt Off	BR	257 Sqn		Continued service as flight instructor in Canada
North, Harold Leslie	Fg Off	NZ	43 Sqn		KIA 1 May 1942
North-Bomford, David John	Sgt	BR	17 Sqn		
Norwell, John King "Jock"	Sgt	BR	54 & 41 Sqns	AFC	Surviving aircrew Born Perth, Scotland 4 October 1917; Commissioned July 1942; granted commission as Fg Off in RAFVR 1947; retired 1954.
Norwood, Robin Keith Collen	Plt Off	BR	65 Sqn		Died 2 April 1970
Nosowicz, Zbigniew	Plt Off	POL	56 Sqn	KW	
Nowak, Tadeusz	Plt Off	POL	253 Sqn	VM, KW**	KIA 21 September 1941
Nowakiewicz, Eugeniusz Jan Adam	Sgt	POL	302 Sqn	VM, KW**	Crashed and taken POW 23 July 1942
Nowell, William Ronald	Sub Lt (FAA)	BR	804 NAS		Died 2 December 1976
Nowierski, Tadeusz	Plt Off	POL	609 Sqn	VM, KW***, DFC	Died 2 April 1983
Nunn, Stanley George	Plt Off	BR	236 Sqn	DFC	
Nute, Romilly Ronald James	Sgt	BR	23 Sqn		KIA 11 March 1941 (Air Gunner)
Nutter, Reginald Charles	Sgt	BR	257 Sqn	DFC	Died 9 December 2014

== Notes on table ==
- Ranks given are those held during the Battle of Britain, although a higher rank may have been achieved after the Battle.
- All individuals listed in bold and highlighted in silver are believed to be still alive.
- Aircrew listed as KIA, MIA, WIA or KIFA during the Battle of Britain are highlighted in blue.
- The awards listed include those made during the Battle of Britain and during the remainder of World War II, as well as any made post-war.
- In order to limit the numbers of footnotes which would otherwise be required, the symbol ‡ under "Notes" indicates several entries in the text of Ramsay 1989, while the symbol † indicates that information on the circumstances under which an airman became a casualty during the Battle is included in the text of the book. Where more than one crew member of a multi place aircraft was involved this is included as a cross-reference under "Notes"
- In addition to 2,353 British aircrew, the RAF Roll of Honour recognises 574 personnel from other countries; namely:

Australia, Barbados, Belgium, Canada, Czechoslovakia, France, Ireland, Jamaica, Newfoundland, New Zealand, Poland, Rhodesia, South Africa and the United States.

=== Abbreviations ===
- (CO) after "Sqn" denotes Commanding Officer of that squadron, as per the RAF Fighter Command Order of Battle on 15 September 1940, unless otherwise indicated.
- (FAA) after a rank denotes a member of the Fleet Air Arm rather than the RAF.
- "KIA" – "killed in action"
- "KIFA" – "killed in flying accident", i.e. not during combat
- "MIA" – "missing in action".
- "WIA" – "wounded in action" leading to death which, in some cases, may have occurred months later.
- "POW" – "prisoner of war".
- For details of RAF rank abbreviations, see RAF Commissioned Officer Ranks and RAF Non-Commissioned Officer Ranks.
- For details of FAA rank abbreviations, see FAA Commissioned Officer Ranks.

=== Nationalities ===
AME	American
AUS	Australian
BEL	Belgian
BR	British
CAN	Canadian
CZ	Czechoslovak
FR	French
IRE	Irish
NZ	New Zealander
POL	Polish
RHO	Rhodesian
SA	South African

=== Awards ===
Award	Title	Notes
AE	Air Efficiency Award	Awarded for ten years' efficient service in the Royal Auxiliary Air Force
AFC	Air Force Cross	Awarded for "an act or acts of valour, courage or devotion to duty whilst flying, though not in active operations against the enemy".
CB	Companion of The Order of the Bath	Awarded at the monarch's pleasure
CDeG	Croix de Guerre	A military decoration of both France and Belgium, also commonly bestowed to foreign military forces allied to France and Belgium.
CdeL	Croix de la Libération	A decoration of France awarded for very meritorious conduct with the Free French Forces during World War II.
CdeLd'H	Croix de Légion d'honneur	A decoration of France awarded for excellent civil or military conduct delivered, upon official investigation.
CdeLL	Croix de L'Ordre de Leopold	Awarded to Belgian nationals or some distinguished foreign persons who made very important contributions to the Belgian state or society.
DFC	Distinguished Flying Cross	Awarded to Royal Air Force commissioned officers and Warrant Officers for "an act or acts of valour, courage or devotion to duty whilst flying in active operations against the enemy".
DFC*	Distinguished Flying Cross and Bar	A bar is added to the ribbon for holders of the DFC who received a second award.
DFC**	Distinguished Flying Cross and Bar	A second bar is added to the ribbon for holders of the DFC and Bar who received a third award.
DFM	Distinguished Flying Medal	Awarded to military below commissioned rank, for "an act or acts of valour, courage or devotion to duty whilst flying in active operations against the enemy".
DSO	Distinguished Service Order	Awarded for meritorious or distinguished service by officers of the armed forces during wartime, typically in actual combat.
DSO*	Distinguished Service Order and Bar	A bar is added to the ribbon for holders of the DSO who received a second award.
DSO**	Distinguished Service Order and Two Bars	A second bar is added to the ribbon for holders of the DSO and Bar who received a third award.
GCB	Knight Grand Cross of The Order of the Bath	Awarded at the monarch's pleasure
KCVO	Knight Commander of the Royal Victorian Order	Awarded for personal service to the sovereign
KStJ	Knight of the Order of Saint John	
KW	Krzyz Walecznych, Polish "Cross of Valour"	Awarded to an individual who "has demonstrated deeds of valour and courage on the field of battle."
KZ	Krzyz Zaslugi, Polish "Cross of Merit"	Awarded for exemplary public service or humanitarian work that goes above and beyond the call of duty.
MBE	Member of the Order of the British Empire	Awarded at the monarch's pleasure
MC	Military Cross	Awarded for "an act or acts of exemplary gallantry during active operations against the enemy on land to all members, of any rank".
MM	Military Medal	Awarded for acts of gallantry and devotion to duty under fire
OBE	Officer of the Order of the British Empire	Awarded at the monarch's pleasure
OStJ	Officer of the Order of Saint John	
VC	Victoria Cross	Highest British military decoration, awarded for valour in the face of the enemy.
VM	Virtuti Militari	Highest Polish military award for courage in the face of the enemy.

== See also ==
- Non-British personnel in the RAF during the Battle of Britain
- List of World War II aces from the United Kingdom
- List of World War II flying aces by country
- List of World War II flying aces
- List of RAF aircrew in the Battle of Britain (A–C)
- List of RAF aircrew in the Battle of Britain (D–F)
- List of RAF aircrew in the Battle of Britain (G–K)
- List of RAF aircrew in the Battle of Britain (O–R)
- List of RAF aircrew in the Battle of Britain (S–U)
- List of RAF aircrew in the Battle of Britain (V–Z)

== Bibliography ==
- Ramsay, Winston, ed. The Battle of Britain Then and Now Mk V. London: Battle of Britain Prints International Ltd, 1989. ISBN 0-900913-46-0.
- Ringlstetter, Herbert (2005). Helmut Wick, An Illustrated Biography Of The Luftwaffe Ace And Commander Of Jagdgeschwader 2 During The Battle Of Britain. Atglen, PA: Schiffer Publishing. ISBN 0-7643-2217-6.
- Remembering the Battle of Britain
- Robert Dixon, '607 Squadron: A Shade Of Blue'. The History Press 2008. ISBN 978-0-7524-4531-1
- Robert Dixon, 'A Gathering Of Eagles' PublishBritannica 2004, ISBN 1-4137-3498-7
