= George Melville-Jackson =

George Holmes Melville-Jackson
- Born: 23 November 1919; Weston-super-Mare
- Died: 7 March 2009 (aged 89)
- Military career
- Allegiance: United Kingdom
- Branch: Royal Air Force
- Service years: 1938–1946; 1952–1968
- Rank: Wing Commander
- Commands: No. 47 Squadron RAF (1945–46)
- Conflicts: Second World War: Battle of Britain; Operation Pedestal
- Awards: Distinguished Flying Cross
- Other work: Headmaster; Attempted to obtain a pardon for Anne Boleyn

George Holmes Melville-Jackson, DFC (23 November 1919 – 7 March 2009) was a Royal Air Force officer and a flying ace of the Second World War who fought in the Battle of Britain and the siege of Malta.

== Early life ==
Born in Weston-super-Mare on 23 November 1919, George Melville-Jackson was educated at St Lawrence College, Ramsgate. He joined the Royal Air Force Volunteer Reserve in June 1938 to undertake pilot training.

== Second World War ==
Having been called up for service in the RAF as a sergeant on the outbreak of the Second World War, in July 1940 Melville-Jackson was posted to No. 236 Squadron. He was with the squadron throughout the Battle of Britain, flying Bristol Blenheims on convoy patrols and escort sorties over the Channel and Western Approaches.

Melville-Jackson flew Bristol Beaufighter heavy fighters with No. 248 Squadron, joining in July 1942. The squadron was assigned to Coastal Command to provide long-range fighter support to the anti-submarine aircraft operating against U-boats in the Western Approaches and the Bay of Biscay. In August, Melville-Jackson flew in support of Operation Pedestal, the crucial convoy mission that resupplied the island of Malta in 1942.

In April 1943 he was awarded the Distinguished Flying Cross for his actions. Melville-Jackson was released from the RAF in 1946. The same year he married Elizabeth Whyte; they later had two children, a son who went on to be a RAF pilot, and a daughter.

== Later life ==
After leaving the RAF, he studied at the University of Cambridge, attaining a Bachelor of Arts, before becoming co-headmaster of St Felix School in Felixstowe.

He rejoined the RAF in 1952 as a pilot, flying night fighters in Germany and England. He spent three years in the United States and then returned to Germany, where he was the sector controller at the Uedem air defence radar site. He retired from the RAF as a wing commander in 1968.

Melville-Jackson is also notable for his attempt to obtain a pardon for Anne Boleyn. He wrote to the then Home Secretary, Charles Clarke, asking him to pardon the wife of Henry VIII on the grounds that she "was 'obviously innocent' of the crimes of adultery, incest and witchcraft that led to her being beheaded in 1536". He also called for her remains to be moved to Westminster Abbey to be interred alongside her daughter, Elizabeth I (they currently lie in a traitor's grave in the Tower of London). The Home Office did not grant his requests.

Melville-Jackson was proud of his Battle of Britain link and was present when the Battle of Britain London Monument was unveiled by Prince Charles and the Duchess of Cornwall on Victoria Embankment.
