= Hugh Reilley =

Canadian Air Force officer (1918–1940)

Hugh William Reilley
- Born: Hugh William Reilley; 29 May 1918; London, Ontario, Canada
- Died: 17 October 1940 (aged 22); Crockham Hill, Sevenoaks
- Burial place: Gravesend Cemetery, Kent
- Military career
- Allegiance: United Kingdom
- Branch: Royal Air Force Volunteer Reserve
- Service years: 1940
- Rank: Pilot Officer
- Units: No. 64 Squadron RAF; No. 66 Squadron RAF
- Conflicts: World War II: European air campaign; Battle of Britain †

Hugh William Reilley (29 May 1918 – 17 October 1940) was a Canadian fighter pilot who flew for the RAF during the Battle of Britain.

== Early life ==
Born in London, Ontario, Canada. Reilley was educated at London South Collegiate from 1933 to 1938.

== Second World War ==
In May 1939, Reilley joined the Royal Air Force. He flew with No. 64 Squadron and No. 66 Squadron in Spitfires during the Battle of Britain. He was shot down in his Spitfire I (R6800) on 17 October 1940 by a Bf 109 of JG 51 flown by Oberstleutnant Werner Mölders over Westerham Kent at 15:25hrs. His Spitfire crashed and burned out at Crockham Hill, Sevenoaks.

Reilley was 22 years old. He is buried in Gravesend Cemetery, Kent.

== See also ==
- List of RAF aircrew in the Battle of Britain
- Non-British personnel in the RAF during the Battle of Britain § United States
