= Alastair Ogilvy =

Charles Alexander Ogilvy
- Nickname: Alistair
- Born: 30 November 1915; Kelso, Scotland
- Died: 23 February 1995 (aged 79)
- Allegiance: United Kingdom
- Branch: Royal Air Force
- Service years: 1939–1945
- Rank: Squadron Leader
- Conflicts: World War II: Battle of Britain
- Awards: 1939–45 Star medal (with the Battle of Britain Clasp)

Squadron Leader Charles Alexander "Alistair" Ogilvy (30 November 1915 – 23 February 1995) was a British Royal Air Force officer who flew with Fighter Command during the Battle of Britain. Due to records lost during World War II, he was not recognised as one of The Few until after his death.

== Early life ==
Ogilvy, who was known throughout his life as Alastair, was born on 30 November 1915 in Kelso, Scotland, the eldest of five sons. He was educated at Edinburgh Academy. After leaving school he moved to London and worked for the Northern Assurance Company. Whilst living in London Ogilvy played rugby union for the London Scottish rugby club.

== Royal Air Force ==
Ogilvy joined the Royal Air Force Volunteer Reserve in 1939 and was trained as a pilot at RAF Woodley near Reading. He was promoted to Sergeant on 29 September 1940. He joined No. 610 Squadron RAF at RAF Acklington on 14 October 1940 and flew two operational sorties on 25 October 1940, this qualifying him for the Battle of Britain Clasp.

Ogilvy was posted to RAF Cranwell as a flying instructor, where he trained more than 120 pilots over a 3-year period in over 1,000 flights. He was commissioned on 29 September 1941 and promoted to the rank of Flight Lieutenant on 29 September 1942.

He was posted to No. 622 Squadron RAF at RAF Mildenhall in 1945, flying Lancaster bombers, and took part in 16 bombing raids, as well as Operations Manna (delivering food parcels to the Netherlands), Exodus (bringing home British prisoners of war), Baedecker, and Dodge Bari.

== Later life ==
Ogilvy had married in 1939 and had two daughters, Anne born in 1940 and Susan born in 1942.

After the end of the war Ogilvy returned to the insurance business. He continued to play rugby union for the London Scottish rugby club, captaining the 1st XV in 1946–7 season.

He finally retired in 1985 by which time he was a director and secretary of the Reinsurance Offices Association. He enjoyed his golf and garden, and was a Church warden. Ogilvy died, aged 79, on 23 February 1995.

== Recognition as one of The Few ==
Upon the death of her mother, Susan, Ogilvy's daughter, found that her father's 1939–45 Star medal had a Battle of Britain Clasp on it. She also found records that showed her father had flown Spitfires and took part in two sorties on 25 October 1940. She hired a researcher and contacted the Battle of Britain Memorial Committee to start the process of verifying her father's wartime records.

Initially it was believed that Ogilvy's name could not be added to the Battle of Britain London Monument but after support from a company, the name was added to the bronze panel.

Ogilvy's name was unveiled on 26 July 2010. Present were Ogilvy's daughter, Susan, Robert Foster (pilot), the Chairman of the Battle of Britain Fighter Association, Councillor Robert Davis, Deputy Leader Westminster City Council, Michael Conway, managing director FM Conway (who had funded the addition), and Air Commodore Gordon Bruce, representing the Chief of the Air Staff.
