= Jean Offenberg =

Belgian flying ace

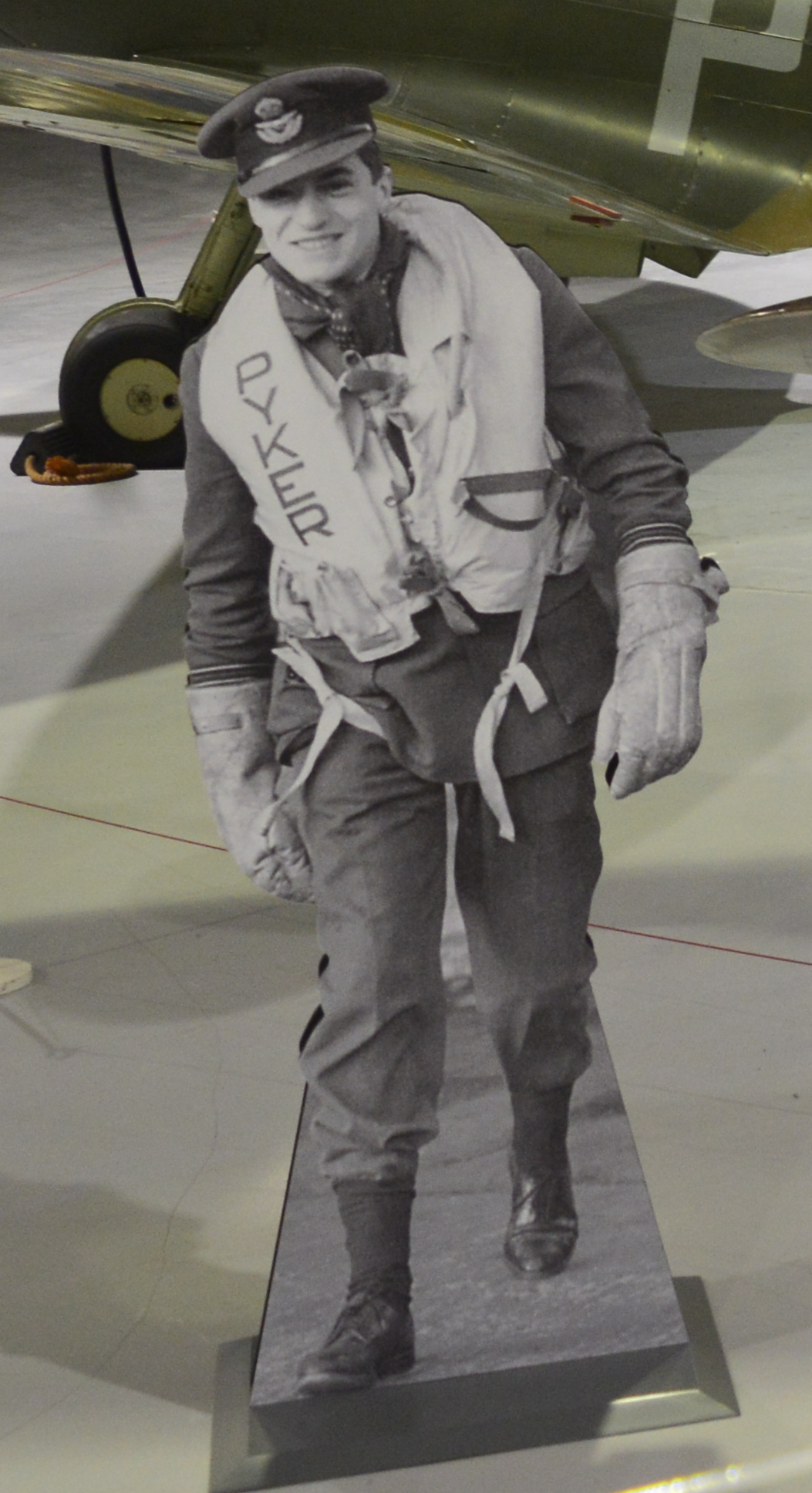
- Born: 3 July 1916; Laeken, Brussels, Belgium
- Died: 22 January 1942 (aged 24); Near Digby, England
- Military career
- Allegiance: Belgium; United Kingdom
- Branch: Aéronautique Militaire Belge; Royal Air Force
- Rank: Flight Lieutenant
- Nickname: Pyker
- Units: 4 Squadron (AéMI); No. 145 Squadron (RAF); No. 609 Squadron (RAF)
- Conflicts: Second World War; German invasion of Belgium; Battle of France; Battle of Britain; Channel Front
- Awards: Distinguished Flying Cross; Belgian Croix de guerre

Jean Henri Marie Offenberg, DFC (3 July 1916 – 22 January 1942) was a Belgian flying ace of the Royal Air Force (RAF) during the Second World War. He was credited with at least five aerial victories.

From Laeken, Offenberg began his military career as a fighter pilot with the Aéronautique Militaire Belge (Belgian Army Air Force). When Germany invaded Belgium in 1940, he destroyed one German bomber but the country was quickly overrun and he escaped to France. He was briefly involved in the efforts to defend that country against the invading Germans but on 20 June, began making his way to French-controlled North Africa before travelling with other Belgian pilots to join the RAF. Posted to No. 145 Squadron, he achieved several more aerial victories during the last few months of 1940 and throughout the following year. Transferred to No. 609 Squadron in mid-1941, he flew extensively on operations to continental Europe. He was killed in a flying accident on 22 January 1942.

== Early life ==
Born on 3 July 1916, Jean Henri Marie Offenberg was from Laeken, a suburb of Brussels. He joined the Aéronautique Militaire Belge or AéMI (Belgian Army Air Force) and underwent training to become a fighter pilot. Once this was completed, he was posted to 4 Squadron, 2 Group of the 2e Régiment d'Aéronautique (2nd Regiment), at the time based at Nivelles and equipped with the Fairey Firefly IIM biplane fighter. The squadron's aircraft was replaced in the beginning of 1940 with a more modern Italian biplane fighter, the Fiat CR.42 Falco.

== Second World War ==
On 10 May 1940, the German armed forces commenced their invasion of Belgium. Offenberg was immediately involved in the aerial fighting of the campaign, shooting down one Dornier Do 17 medium bomber and damaging another the same day near St Trond. Following the defeat of the Belgians, Offenberg and the other surviving pilots of his squadron flew their CR.42s to France, offering their services to that country. They provided the aerial defences of the airfield at Chartres. On 20 June, he and another pilot, Alexis Jollard, took two French Caudron Simoun aircraft and flew them to Corsica, and from there to Philippeville in Algeria. Their destination was the AéMI flying training school at Oujda but when they arrived they found morale to be low. Seeking to make contact with the British, the pair travelled to Casablanca where they joined up with other Belgian pilots along with a group of Polish aviators who had obtained passage to Gibraltar on a cargo ship. Once there, they found a berth on a ship to Britain, where they arrived on 16 July.

=== Battle of Britain ===
Immediately joining the Royal Air Force (RAF), Offenberg was given the rank of pilot officer. Soon nicknamed Pyker, he proceeded to No. 6 Operational Training Unit at Sutton Bridge on 30 July, and three weeks later was posted to No. 145 Squadron. When he arrived, the squadron, which operated the Hawker Hurricane fighter, was based at Westhampnett and was heavily engaged in the Battle of Britain but within a few days it was shifted north for a rest, based at Drem with a detachment at the RAF station at Montrose. On 8 September, flying to the east of Montrose, he and another pilot engaged and damaged a Do 17.

In October, No. 145 Squadron rejoined No. 11 Group, based at Tangmere. The pace of the aerial fighting over the south of England had slowed by this time, but on 27 October, Offenberg engaged a Messerschmitt Bf 109 fighter and probably destroyed it south of Bembridge. On 1 November, he shot down a Bf 109 north of Selsey. With a pilot of No. 56 Squadron, he combined to destroy another Bf 109 5 miles (8.0 km) to the south of the Isle of Wight on 6 November. Three days later he and a second pilot damaged a Junkers Ju 88 medium bomber off the Isle of Wight. Although the Ju 88 returned to its airfield, it crashed on landing. The deterioration of the weather as winter set in largely put an end to the RAF's fighter operations for a number of weeks but despite this, he was credited with a half share in a Heinkel He 111 medium bomber that was destroyed off Selsey Bill on 11 December.

=== Channel Front ===
In January 1941, Offenberg's squadron reequipped with Supermarine Spitfire Mk II fighters and began to be involved in Fighter Command's offensive operations to continental Europe. It flew its first of these missions, known as a 'Circus', on 5 March as part of the Tangmere Wing, providing cover for Bristol Blenheim light bombers attacking Boulogne. On 5 May, flying north of Pointe de Barfleur, he destroyed one Heinkel He 60 reconnaissance seaplane and damaged another. He then shot down a Bf 109 into the English Channel, his last aerial claim with No. 145 Squadron. Offenberg was awarded the Distinguished Flying Cross the following month; he was the first Belgian pilot serving in the RAF to receive this honour.

On 17 June, Offenberg was transferred to No. 609 Squadron. His new unit was based at Biggin Hill and, equipped with the Spitfire Mk Vb fighter, was heavily engaged in the ongoing 'Circus' offensive. A flight of the squadron was composed of Belgian personnel and within days of his arrival, Offenberg became its commander. His first claim with his new squadron was on 22 June, and was for a damaged Bf 109, encountered to the east of Gravelines, during a 'Circus' operation where No. 609 Squadron provided cover for Blenheims bombing railway marshaling yards at Hazebrouck.

In another 'Circus' operation on 7 July, Offenberg destroyed a Bf 109 on 7 July without firing his guns. His flight was engaged by a number of Bf 109s and he followed one into a near vertical dive; while he pulled out, the German fighter kept going and crashed into the sea off Le Touquet. Offenberg was responsible for the probable destruction of four Bf 109s, on 19 July, 6 August, 27 August and 29 August. Shortly after the first of this string of claims he was awarded the Belgian Croix de guerre. He damaged a Bf 109 north of Saint-Omer on 27 September and a second on 13 October, about 10 miles (16 km) north of Le Touquet.

In November, No. 609 Squadron relocated to Digby in the Midlands and commenced an intensive period of training. On 22 January 1942, Offenberg, now with the rank of flight lieutenant, was conducting a flying training session at about 1,000 feet (300 m) with a pilot who had only recently joined the squadron. A pilot from No. 92 Squadron, seeking to simulate a dogfight, dived on Offenberg's Spitfire but misjudged the distance. He crashed into the rear fuselage of Offenberg's aircraft, sending it out of control and crashing to the ground. Offenberg was killed in the crash, as was the other pilot. Offenberg was buried at the cemetery of a church at nearby Scopwick on 26 January. After the war his remains were moved to the Belgian Airmen's Field of Honour at Brussels Town Cemetery.

Offenberg is credited with destroying five German aircraft and sharing in the destruction of two more. He is also credited with five German aircraft probably destroyed, five damaged and shares in two more damaged. His diaries formed the basis of the book Lonely Warrior, prepared by Victor Houart and published in 1956 by Souvenir Press.
