= No. 235 Squadron RAF =

Defunct flying squadron of the Royal Air Force

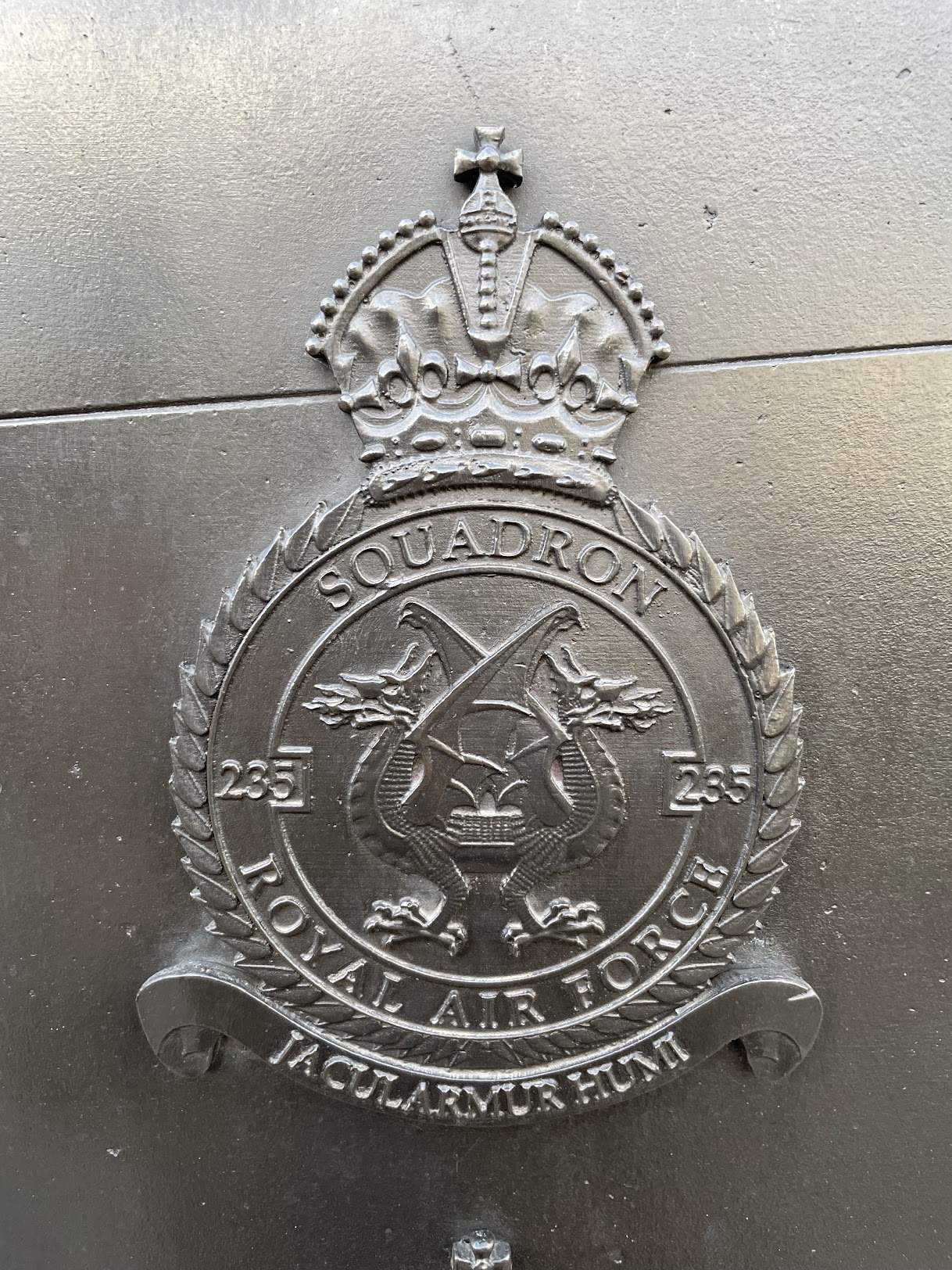
- The squadron's heraldic badge as it appears on the Battle of Britain Monument in London.
- Active: 20 August 1918 – 22 February 1919; 30 October 1939 – 10 July 1945
- Country: United Kingdom
- Branch: Royal Air Force
- Type: Flying squadron
- Role: Anti-submarine warfare Commerce raiding Aerial reconnaissance
- Part of: RAF Coastal Command
- Mottos: Latin: Jaculamur Humi ("We Strike Them to the Ground")

Insignia
- Squadron Badge heraldry: A double Wyvern spouting fire
- Squadron Codes: LA (Oct 1939 – Sep 1942, Jun 1944 – Jul 1945)

No. 235 Squadron RAF was an anti-submarine warfare squadron of the Royal Air Force which disbanded during July 1945. It was active in both the First World War, forming during August 1918 and disbanding in February 1919, and in the Second World War, reforming at the end of October 1939, and served as a squadron in RAF Coastal Command.

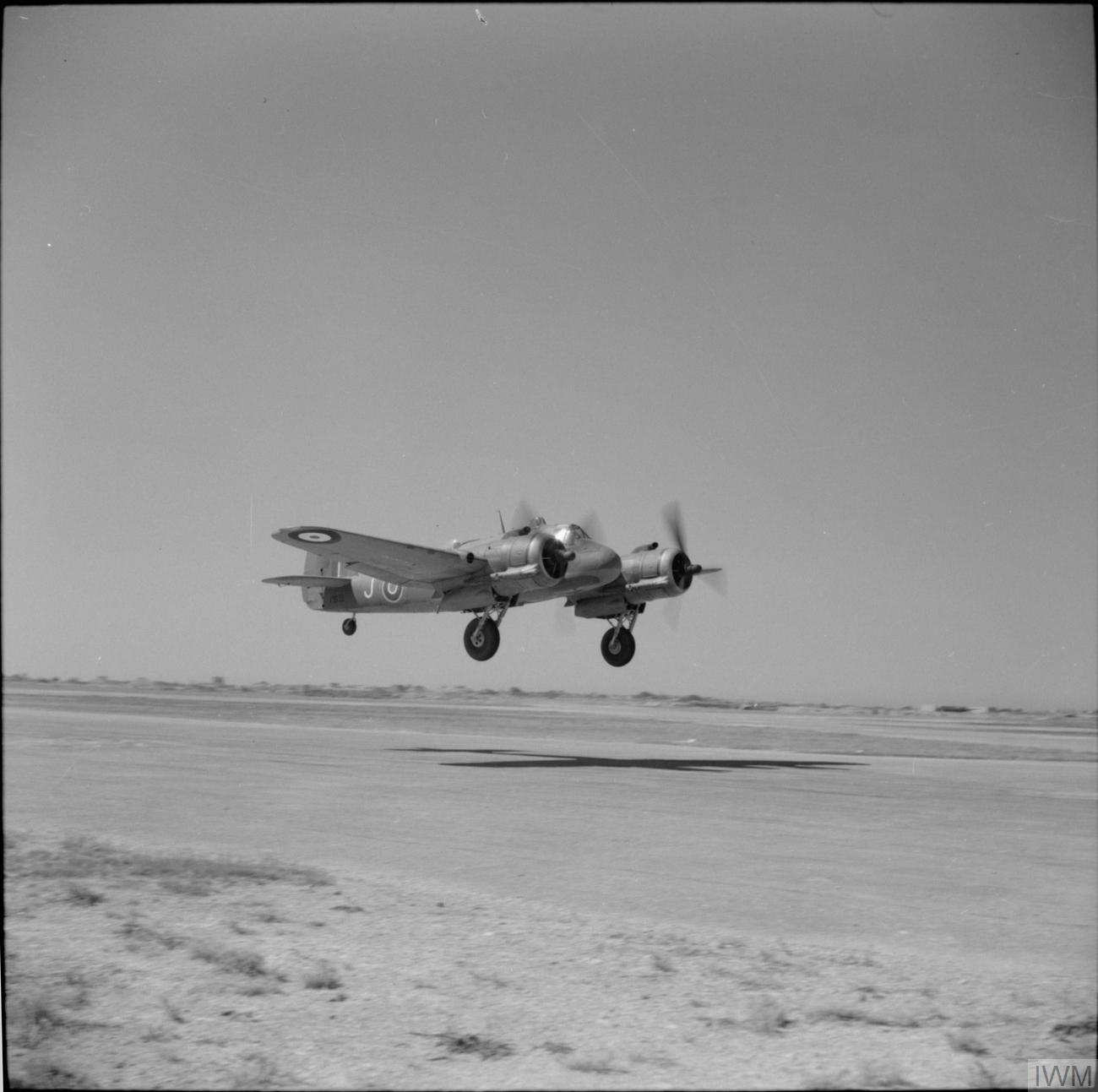
A 235 Sqn Beaufighter taking off from RAF Luqa airfield, Malta, during Operation Harpoon

== History ==
=== Formation and World War I ===
No. 235 Squadron RAF was formed at Newlyn, Cornwall on 20 August 1918 from the former No. 424 and 425 flights RNAS, and was equipped with Short 184 seaplanes for anti-submarine patrols. It flew these until the Armistice on 11 November 1918. The squadron disbanded three months later, on 22 February 1919.

=== Reformation and World War II ===
It reformed at RAF Manston, in Kent, on 30 October 1939 as a fighter squadron, but was equipped at first with Fairey Battle, a single-engine light bomber, for training purposes, which were in February 1940 replaced by Bristol Blenheim, a twin-engine light bomber. The squadron then transferred to Coastal Command and later moved RAF Dyce, near Aberdeen, in June 1941. In December 1941 the squadron began re-equipping with the Bristol Beaufighter, a twin-engine multirole aircraft, and in May 1942 moved to RAF Docking, in Norfolk. In July 1942 the squadron moved to RAF Chivenor, in Devon, and then returned to RAF Leuchars, Scotland, in January 1943. In August 1943 the squadron returned again to South West England, in preparation for the D-Day landings, later operating Atlantic anti-submarine patrols from RAF St Angelo in Northern Ireland. The squadron re-equipped in June 1944 with the de Havilland Mosquito twin-engine multirole combat aircraft, and moved to RAF Banff in Scotland during September 1944, joining the "Banff Strike Wing". The squadron disbanded on 10 July 1945.

== Aircraft operated ==
From	To	Aircraft	Variant
Aug 1918	Feb 1919	Short 184	
Dec 1939	Feb 1940	Fairey Battle	Mk.II ?
Feb 1940	May 1940	Bristol Blenheim	Mk.If
Feb 1940	Dec 1941	Bristol Blenheim	Mk.IVf
Dec 1941	Sep 1942	Bristol Beaufighter	Mk.Ic
Jul 1942	Oct 1943	Bristol Beaufighter	Mk.VIc
Oct 1943	May 1944	Bristol Beaufighter	Mk.X
Apr 1944	Jun 1944	Bristol Beaufighter	Mk.XI
Jun 1944	Jul 1945	de Havilland Mosquito	Mk.VI
