= Battle of Britain Memorial, Capel-le-Ferne =

WWII memorial in Kent, England

Coordinates: 51°05′55″N 1°12′21″E

The Battle of Britain Memorial
- United Kingdom
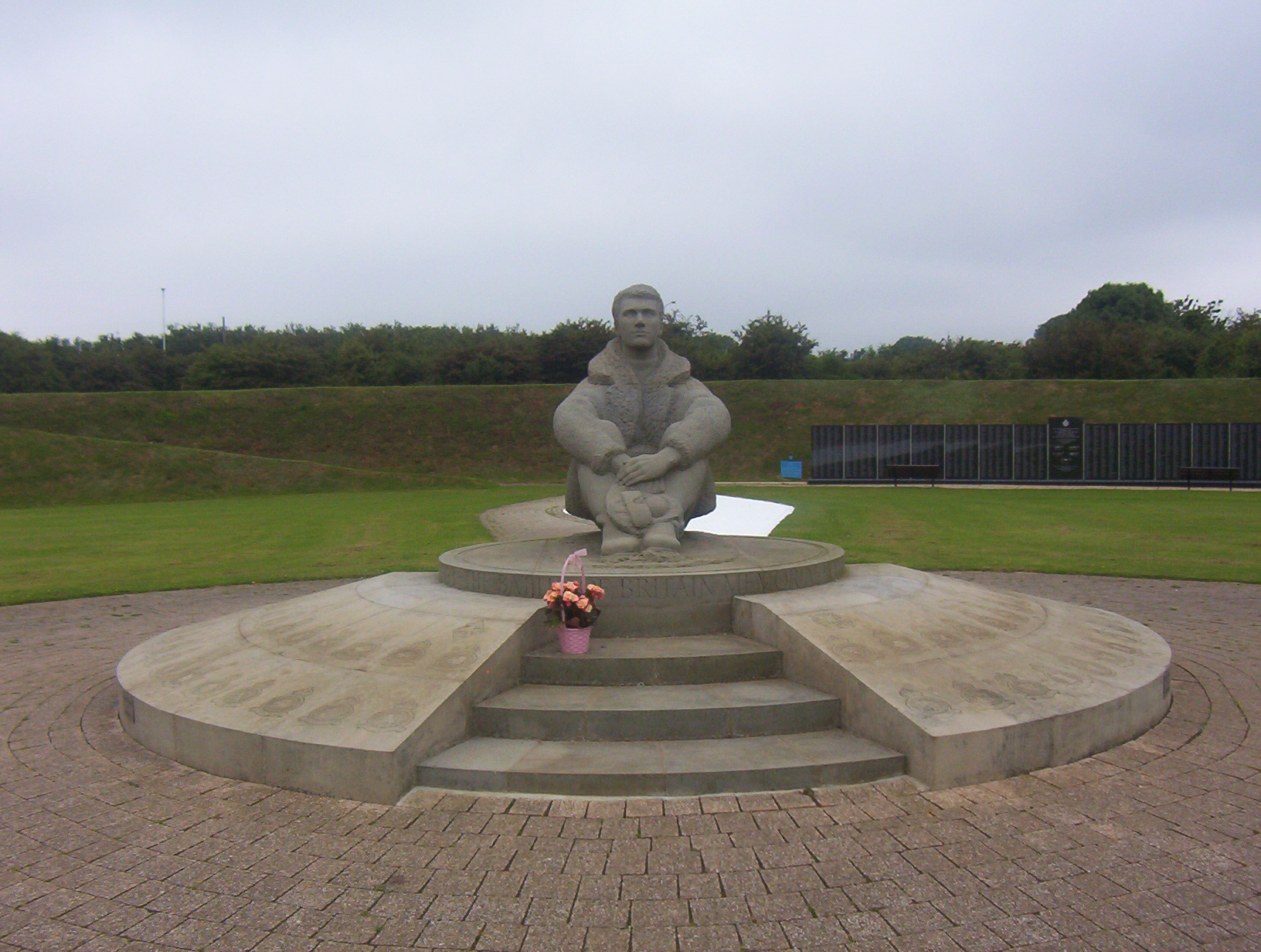
- Statue of a seated pilot at the Battle of Britain Memorial
- For the RAF casualties of the Battle of Britain
- Unveiled: 9 July 1993
- Location: near Capel-le-Ferne
- Designed by: Harry Gray

The Battle of Britain Memorial is a monument to aircrew who flew in the Battle of Britain. It is sited on the White Cliffs at Capel-le-Ferne, near Folkestone, on the coast of Kent.

== History ==
It was initiated by the Battle of Britain Memorial Trust, and opened by the Queen Mother on 9 July 1993. It is formed of a large propeller-shaped base, with the figure of a seated pilot carved by Harry Gray sitting at the centre.

Also on the site are replicas of a Hawker Hurricane and Supermarine Spitfire and the Christopher Foxley-Norris Memorial Wall, on which appears the names of the almost 3,000 fighter aircrew who flew in the Battle.

In October 2010 The Duchess of Cornwall unveiled a bust of Air Chief Marshal Sir Keith Park by sculptor Will Davies at the site.

== The Wing ==
The new visitor centre, 'The Wing' is an eye-catching design in the shape of a Spitfire wing, complete with dihedral angle. Architects Godden Allen Lawn, along with consulting engineers Crofton Consulting were appointed to undertake the building design with contractors Epps Construction undertaking the construction work. The building was opened by Queen Elizabeth II on 26 March 2015, and won 'Project of the Year' at the 2016 Kent Design and Development awards.

Conceived as an experience rather than a museum, the building contains The Scramble Experience and a central ‘cockpit’ area with an open balcony offering views across the Channel to France, from where the Luftwaffe would have appeared in 1940. A high-tech screen is used to superimpose historical film of incoming German aircraft over the real view of the same scene.

Battle of Britain Memorial

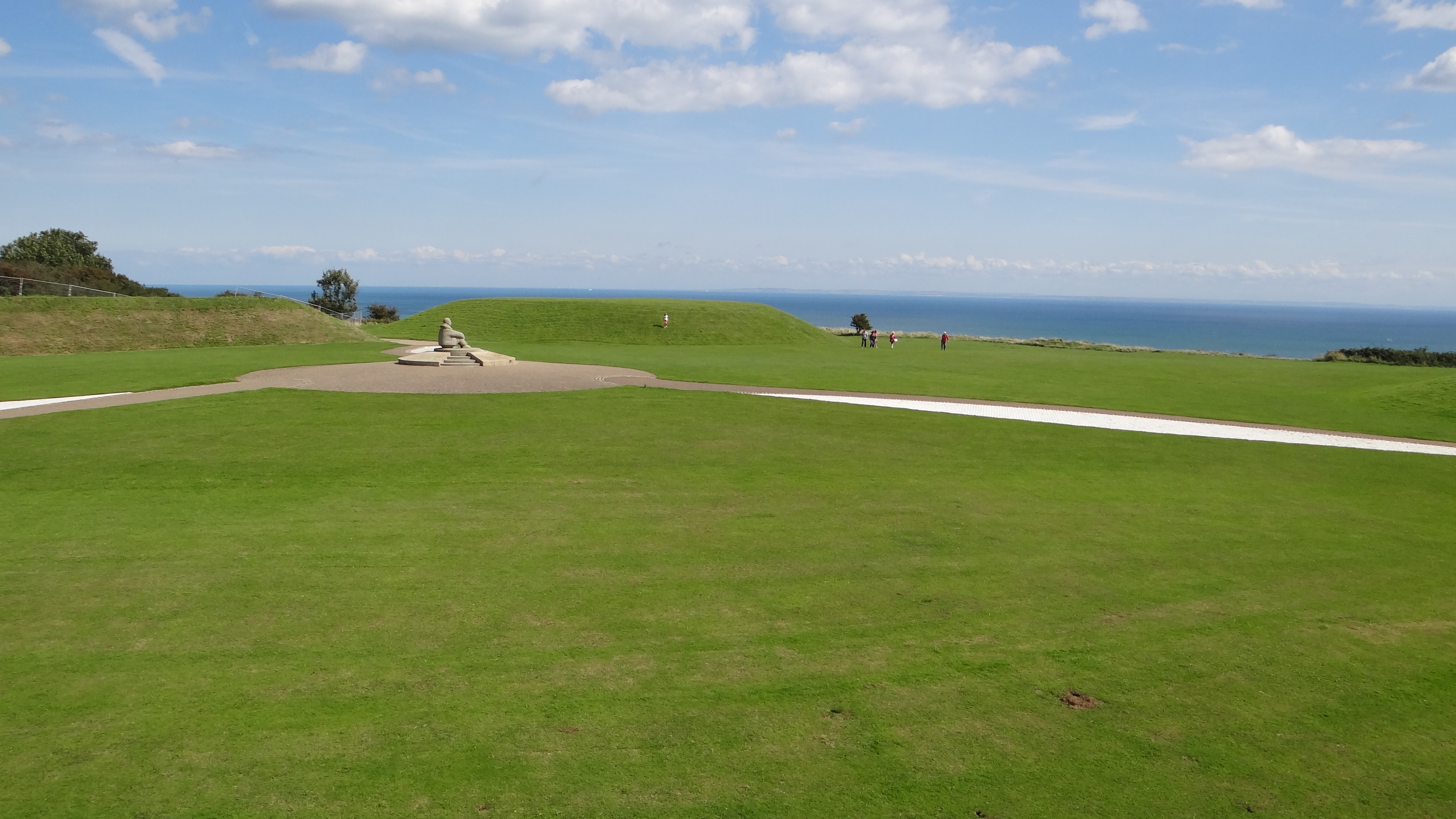

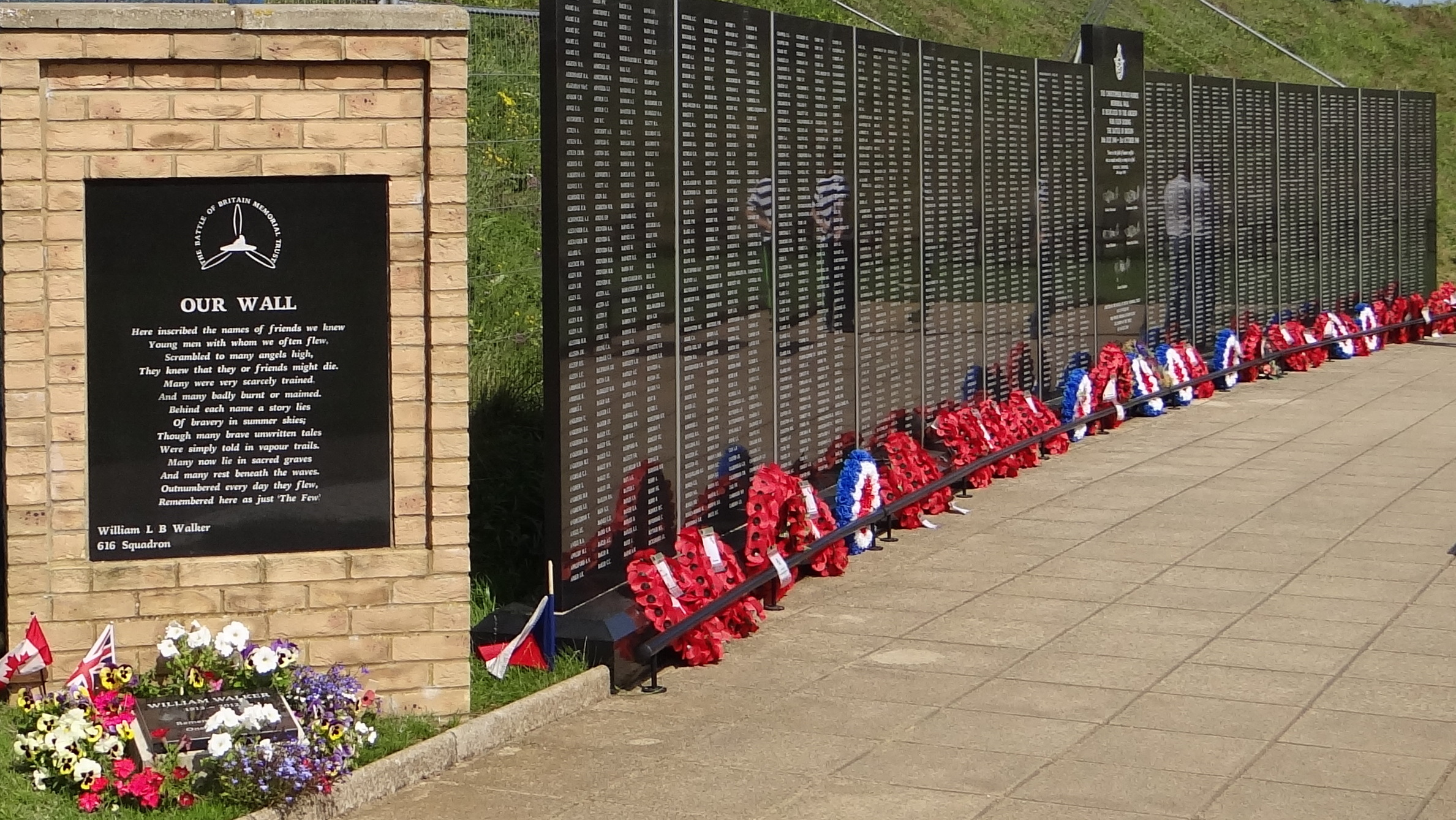
Memorial Wall

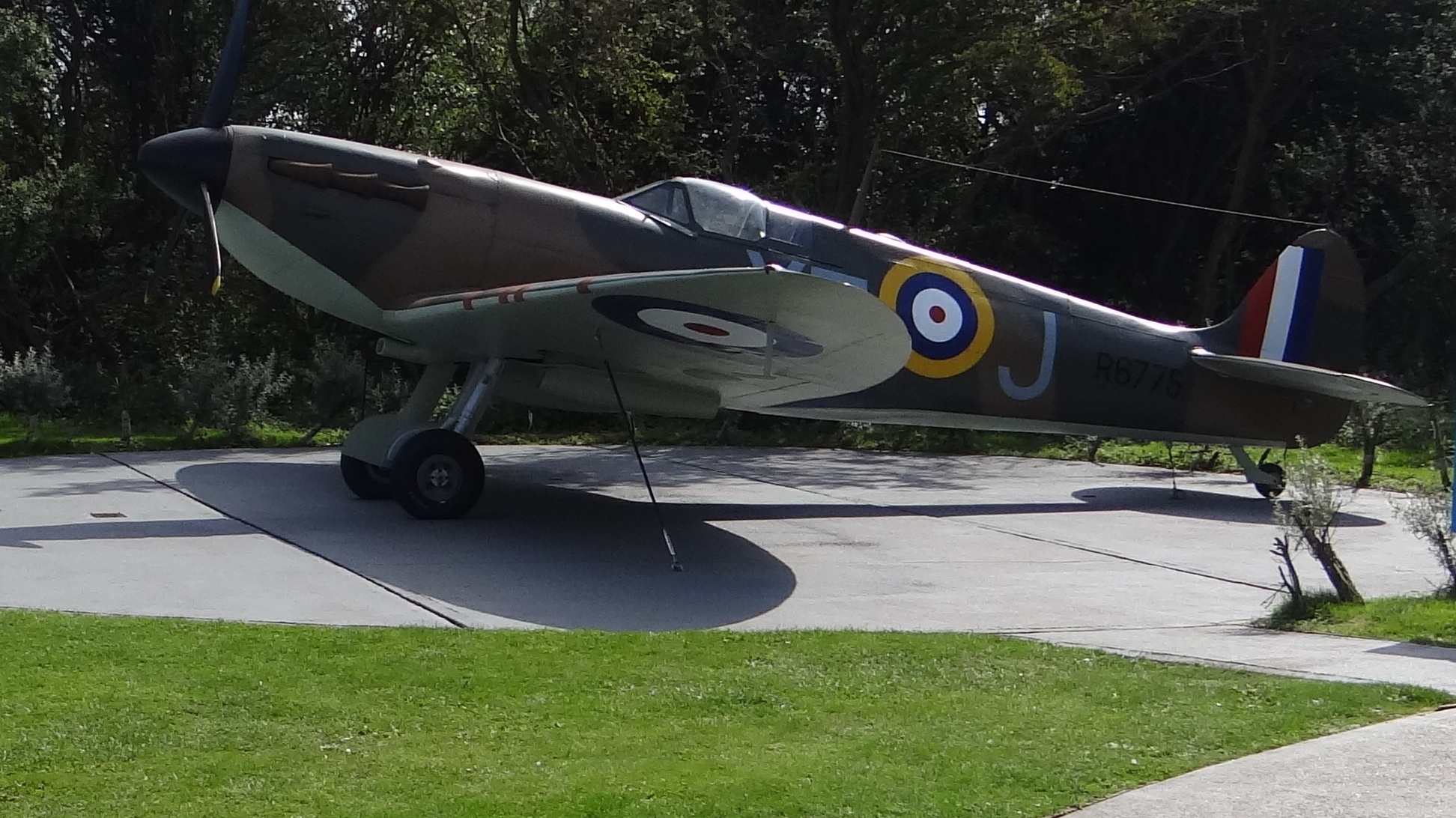
Spitfire Replica
