= No. 236 Squadron RAF =

Defunct flying squadron of the Royal Air Force

- Active: August 1918 - 15 May 1919; 31 October 1939 – 25 May 1945
- Country: United Kingdom
- Branch: Royal Air Force
- Mottos: Latin: Speculate nuntiate (Latin: Having watched, bring word)

Insignia
- Squadron Badge heraldry: In front of a fountain, a mailed fist grasping a winged sword.
- Squadron Codes: FA (Oct 1939 - 1941); ND (1941 - Aug 1943); MB (Jul 1944 - May 1945)

No. 236 Squadron RAF was a Royal Air Force aircraft squadron, which served during the First World War in the anti-submarine role, and for most of Second World War employed on anti-shipping operations.

== History ==
The squadron was formed on 20 August 1918 from No's 493, 515 & 516 Flights at Mullion, in Cornwall. Equipped with DH6s, it carried out anti-submarine patrols along the coast until the end of the war, disbanding on 15 May 1919.

Reformed as a fighter squadron at RAF Stradishall on 31 October 1939, the squadron was equipped with Blenheims. It took them to Bircham Newton in February 1940, where the unit was transferred to Coastal Command. In April it moved to Speke, rejoining Fighter Command and the following month moved to RAF Filton to fly defensive patrols over the English Channel; in July a move to Thorney Island saw it back in Coastal Command, where it stayed for the rest of the war.

From August 1940 it operated from bases in the south-west of England, carrying out anti-shipping patrols over the Channel, and Irish Sea, having re-equipped with Beaufighters in October 1941.

On 12 June, a Beaufighter flown by a volunteer crew of Flight Lieutenant A. K. Gatward and Sergeant G. Fern made a solo sortie to Paris intending to disrupt a noon parade of German troops down the Champs-Elysees. On arrival it was seen that there was no parade but dropped a French tricolore over the empty avenue and shot up the secondary target of the Gestapo headquarters in the Ministry of Marine on the Place de la Concorde before returning.

It was transferred to RAF Wattisham in February 1942 and reduced to a cadre. It received new Beaufighters in March and resumed its previous duties, although these were now flown over the North Sea, with detachments in the south-west who undertook similar duties over the Bay of Biscay. In September 1942 the squadron moved to North Coates and in April 1943 became a part of the strike wing formed there, operating as such until the end of the war. The squadron disbanded on 25 May 1945.
