= List of RAF aircrew in the Battle of Britain (V–Z) =

The following is a list of pilots and other aircrew who flew during the Battle of Britain, and were awarded the Battle of Britain Clasp to the 1939–45 Star by flying at least one authorised operational sortie with an eligible unit of the Royal Air Force or Fleet Air Arm during the period from 0001 hours on 10 July to 2359 hours 31 October 1940.

== History ==
In 1942, the Air Ministry made the decision to compile a list from records of the names of pilots who had lost their lives as a result of the fighting during the Battle of Britain (Note: This was initially regarded as being from 8 August to 31 October 1940; however, the dates were later amended to also include those who lost their lives between 10 July and 7 August.) for the purpose of building a national memorial. This became the Battle of Britain Chapel at Westminster Abbey, which was unveiled by King George VI on 10 July 1947. The Roll of Honour within the Chapel contains the names of 1,497 pilots and aircrew killed or mortally wounded during the Battle.

Nothing was done officially, however, to define the qualifications for the classification of a Battle of Britain airman until 9 November 1960. AMO N850, published by the Air Ministry, stated for the first time the requirements for the awarding of the Battle of Britain Star, and listed the 71 units which were deemed to have been under the control of RAF Fighter Command.

In 1955 Flt Lt John Holloway, a serving RAF officer, began a personal challenge to compile a complete list of "The Few". After fourteen years of research Flt Lt Holloway had 2,946 names on the list. Of these airmen, 537 were killed during the Battle or later died of wounds received.

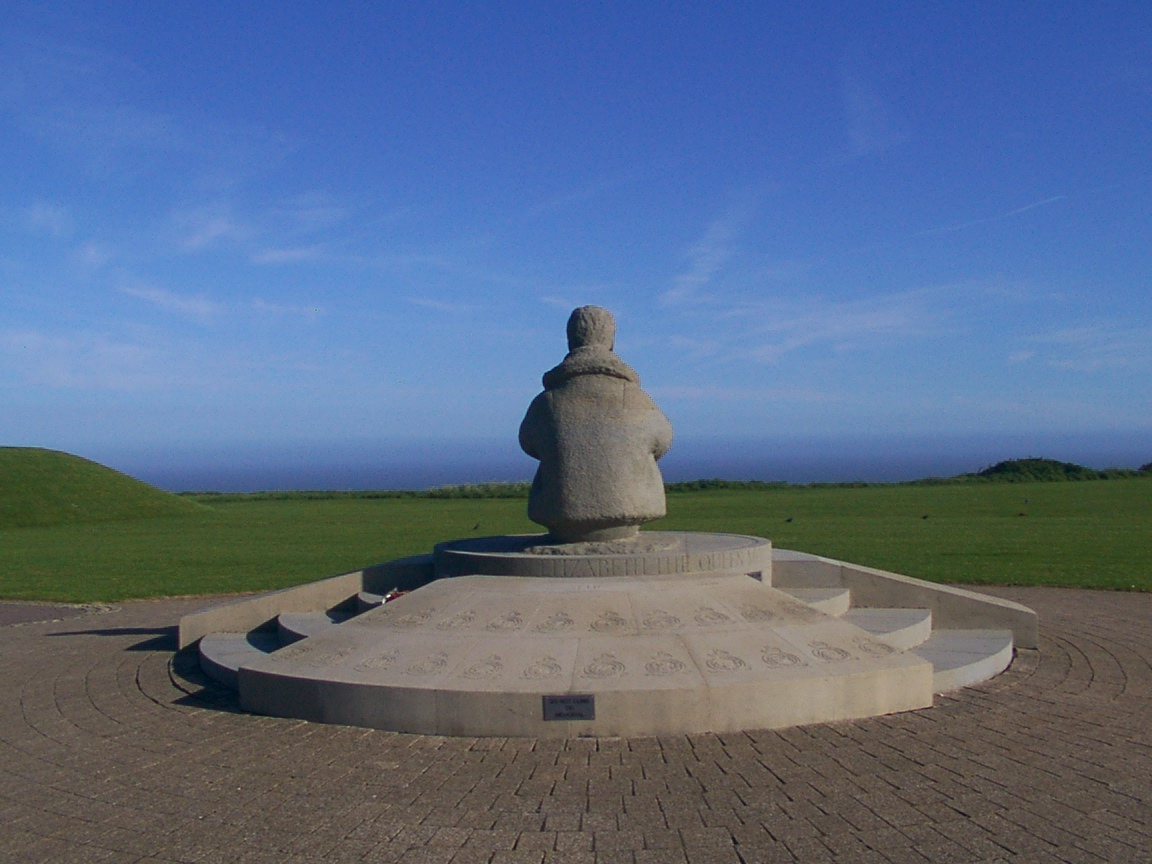
Battle of Britain Memorial at Capel-le-Ferne

The Battle of Britain Memorial Trust, founded by Geoffrey Page, raised funds for the construction of the Battle of Britain Memorial at Capel-le-Ferne near Folkestone in Kent. The Memorial, unveiled by Queen Elizabeth The Queen Mother on 9 July 1993, shares the site with the Christopher Foxley-Norris Memorial Wall on which a complete list of "The Few" is engraved.

More recently, the Battle of Britain Monument on the Victoria Embankment in London was unveiled on 18 September 2005 by Charles, Prince of Wales and his wife Camilla, Duchess of Cornwall. The idea for the monument was conceived by the Battle of Britain Historical Society which then set about raising funds for its construction. The outside of the monument is lined with bronze plaques listing all the Allied airmen who took part in the Battle.

== V ==
Name	Rank	Nationality	Sqn during Battle	Awards	Notes
Van-Den Hove d'Ertsenrijck, Albert Emmanuel Alix Dieudonne Jean Ghislain	Plt Off	BEL	501 & 43 Sqns		KIA 11 September 1940
Van-Lierde, Willi E	Plt Off	BEL	87 Sqn		
Van Mentz, Brian	Fg Off	SA	222 Sqn	DFC	KIA 26 April 1941
Van-Wayen Berghe, Arthur Albert Leopold	Plt Off	BEL	236 Sqn		KIA 10 March 1941
Varley, George Wallace	Plt Off	BR	247 & 79 Sqns		1921-1982 Died 11 February 1982
Vašátko, Alois	Plt Off	CZ	312 Sqn	DFC	KIA 23 June 1942
Velebnovský, Antonín	Plt Off	CZ	1 Sqn		KIA 16 July 1941
Venesoen, François Auguste "Sus"	Sgt	BEL	235 Sqn	DFC	KIA 6 June 1944
Verity, Victor Bosanquet Strachan	Plt Off	NZ	229 Sqn	DFC	5 November 1919-2 February 1979
Veselý, Vlastimil	Plt Off	CZ	312 Sqn		
Vick, James Anderson	Sqn Ldr	BR	607 Sqn (CO)		1908-2000
Vigors, Timothy Ashmead	Plt Off	BR	222 Sqn	DFC	1921-2003 Died 14 November 2003
Viles, Leslie William	Sgt	BR	236 Sqn		1913-1958
Villa, John Wolferstan "Pancho"	Flt Lt	BR	72 & 92 Sqns	DFC	Died 1983
Vincent, Stanley Flamank	Gp Capt	BR	257 & 229 Sqns	CB, DFC, AFC, DL	Retired as AVM in 1950; died 13 March 1976.
Vindiš, František	Sgt	CZ	310 Sqn		
Vinyard, Frederick Fenton	Sgt	BR	64 Sqn		MIA 6 October 1940
Voase-Jeff, Robert	Flt Lt	BR	87 Sqn	DFC*, CdeG	KIA 11 August 1940
Vokes, Arthur Frank	Plt Off	BR	19 Sqn		KIA 5 September 1941 (Pilot)
Vopálecký, Josef	Warrant Officer	CZ	310 Sqn		
Vrána, Adolf	Fg Off	CZ	312 Sqn		
Vybíral, Tomáš	Plt Off	CZ	312 Sqn	DFC, DSO	Died 21 February 1981
Vykoukal, Karel Jan	Plt Off	CZ	111 & 73 Sqns		Born Chotěboř, Czechoslovakia 20 December 1916; KIA 21 May 1942

== W ==
Name	Rank	Nationality	Sqn during Battle	Awards	Notes
Waddingham, John	Plt Off	BR	141 Sqn	DFC	KIA 27 September 1942 (Malta)
Wade, Trevor Sidney "Wimpy"	Plt Off	BR	92 Sqn	DFC, AFC	Later a test pilot for Hawker. KIFA 1951 when the Hawker P.1081 prototype crashed.
Wadham, John Victor	Sgt	BR	145 Sqn		KIA 12 October 1940 aged 21 as a Pilot of Hurricane V7426 which was shot down by Bf 109s over Hastings and crashed near Cranbrook.
Waghorn, Peter Harry	Sgt	BR	249 & 111 Sqns		KIA 11 April 1941 (Malta)
Wagner, Alan Derek	Sgt	BR	151 Sqn		KIA 17 July 1944 (Pilot)
Wainwright, Alec George	Plt Off	BR	151 Sqn		KIA 21 January 1941
Wainwright, Michael Terry	Plt Off	BR	64 Sqn	AFC	Surviving aircrew (born 1919)
Waite, Edward	Sgt	BR	29 Sqn		MIA 31 July 1940 aged 24 following a collision between Blenheims L6722 and L1408 over the Bristol Channel.
Wake, Frederick William	Sgt	BR	264 Sqn		
Wakefield, Herbert Kenneth	Plt Off	BR	235 Sqn	DFC	
Wakeham, Ernest Cecil John	Plt Off	BR	145 Sqn	DFC	MIA 8 August 1940
Wakeling, Sidney Richard Ernest	Sgt	BR	87 Sqn		KIA 25 August 1940 when his Hurricane V7250 was shot down inflames over Portland.
Walch, Stuart Crosby	Flt Lt	AUS	238 Sqn		KIA 11 August 1940
Walker, George Arthur	Sgt	BR	232 Sqn		
Walker, James Arthur "Johnnie"	Fg Off	CAN	111 Sqn	DFC	KIA 8 February 1944, Singapore
Walker, John Harold Gilbert	Fg Off	BR	25 Sqn		KIA 9 May 1942 (Pilot)
Walker, James Ian Bradley	Sgt	NZ	600 Sqn		Died 2009.
Walker, James Richard	Fg Off	CAN	611 & 41 Sqns		KIFA when aircraft ran out of fuel at sea between HMS Argus and Malta (transfer to 261 Sqn), 16 November 1940, aged 20. Robert J. Boret died in the same incident.
Walker, Norman MacDonald	Sgt	BR	615 Sqn		MIA 2 June 1941 (Malta)
Walker, Robert James	Plt Off	BR	72 Sqn	DSO	
Walker, Stanley	Sgt	BR	236 Sqn		KIA 12 February 1942
Walker, William Louis Buchanan	Plt Off	BR	616 Sqn	AE	Surviving aircrew
Walker-Smith, Francis Richard	Sgt	BR	85 Sqn		KIA 13 March 1941 (Pilot)
Wallace, Clarence Alfred Blake	Plt Off	CAN	3 Sqn		KIA 27 October 1941
Wallace, Thomas Young	Sgt	SA	610 & 111 Sqns	DFM	KIA 11 November 1944 (Pilot)
Wallen, Dennis Stanley	Flt Lt	BR	604 Sqn		
Wallens, Ronald Walter "Wally"	Plt Off	BR	41 Sqn	DFC	WIA 5 September 1940. Died 13 November 1995.
Waller, George Alfred	Sgt	BR	29 Sqn	DFC	Died 1983
Walley, Peter Kenneth	Sgt	BR	615 Sqn		KIA 18 August 1940 (Pilot)
Wallis, Donald Sylvester	Sgt	BR	235 Sqn		KIA 22 February 1941
Walmsley, Harold William	Sgt	BR	248 Sqn		MIA 13 December 1940
Walsh, Edmund	Sgt	BR	141 Sqn		
Walsh, John Joseph	Plt Off	CAN	615 Sqn		WIA 2 March 1941 (Malta)
Walsh, John Patrick	Sgt	BR	616 Sqn		KIFA 4 August 1940 when his Spitfire N3271 spun into the ground during dog fight training.
Walsh, Robert William Meade	Sub Lt (FAA)	BR	111 Sqn		
Walton, Herbert	Sgt	BR	87 Sqn		
Want, William Hudson	Sgt	BR	248 Sqn		MIA 19 August 1940 when his Bristol Blenheim went missing of south Norwegian coast during a reconnaissance flight.
Wapniarek, Stefan	Plt Off	POL	302 Sqn	VM, KW	KIA 18 October 1940 when his Hurricane P3872 crashed during an attempted forced landing on return from a patrol in bad weather.
Ward, Derek Harland	Fg Off	NZ	87 Sqn	DFC*	KIA 17 June 1942 (North Africa)
Ward, The Hon Edward Frederick	Sqn Ldr	BR	601 Sqn		Died April 1987
Ward, John Lewis	Plt Off	BR	32 Sqn		KIA 20 March 1942
Ward, Rufus Arthur	Sgt	BR	66 Sqn		KIA 8 October 1940 when he was killed following a bale out from his Spitfire N3043 which was shot down in combat with Bf 109s over Kent.
Ward, William Bruce	Sgt	BR (Note: Listed on CWGC website as Australian)	604 Sqn		KIA 6 April 1943
Ward-Smith, Peter	Sgt	BR	610 Sqn		
Warden, Noel Proctor	Sgt	BR	610 Sqn		KIA 1 October 1941
Ware, Ralph Taverham	Sgt	BR	3 Sqn		KIA 21 January 1945
Wareham, Michael Percy	Plt Off	BR	1 Sqn	DFC	KIA 21 January 1945 (?)
Wareing, Philip Thomas	Sgt	BR	616 Sqn	DCM	Taken POW 26 August 1940 but escaped. Died May 1987
Waring, William	Sgt	BR	23 Sqn		
Warner, William Henry Cromwell	Flt Lt	BR	610 Sqn		MIA 16 August 1940 when he failed to return in his Spitfire R6802 after combat with Bf 109s.
Warren, Charles	Plt Off	BR	152 Sqn	DFC	Died 19 October 2005
Warren, Douglas Albert Palmer	Plt Off	BR	248 Sqn		KIA 9 February 1941
Warren, John Benjamin William	AC1	BR	600 Sqn		KIA 8 August 1940 when Blenheim L8665 was shot down in flames into the sea near Ramsgate, Kent.
Warren, Stanley	Sgt	BR	1 Sqn		MIA 9 October 1940 when his Hurricane V7376 failed to return during a formation flight in cloud over the Wash.
Warren, Thornton Arrowsmith	Sgt	BR	236 Sqn		
Waterston, Robin McGregor	Fg Off	BR	603 Sqn		KIA 31 August 1940 when his Spitfire X4273 was shot down by Bf 109s over London.
Watkins, Douglas Herbert	Fg Off	BR	611 Sqn	DFC	Died 1969
Watkinson, Arthur Basil	Plt Off	SA	66 Sqn		Died 18 October 1985
Watling, William Charles	Plt Off	BR	92 Sqn		KIA 7 February 1941
Watson, Arthur Roy	Plt Off	BR	152 Sqn		KIA 28 November 1940
Watson, Edward James	Plt Off	BR	605 Sqn		KIA 26 February 1942
Watson, Evan Owens	Plt Off	BR	64 Sqn		
Watson, Fredrick Stanley	Plt Off	CAN	3 Sqn		KIA 11 October 1941
Watson, John Gordon	AC2	BR	604 Sqn		
Watson, Lionel George	Plt Off	BR	29 Sqn		
Watson, Rafael F	Fg Off	BR	87 Sqn		
Watson-Parker, Patrick Ian	Sgt	BR	610 Sqn		KIA 13 July 1940 when his Spitfire R6807 crashed during a routine patrol, cause not known.
Watters, Joseph	Plt Off	NZ	236 Sqn		Died 18 April 1981
Watts, Edwin Leslie	Sgt	BR	248 Sqn		KIA 13 April 1943
Watts, Roy Fredrick	Flt Lt	BR	253 Sqn		
Watts, Reginald Douglas Haig	Sgt	BR	235 Sqn		MIA 11 September 1940 when his Blenheim was shot down by Bf 109s and crashed into the sea.
Way, Basil Hugh "Wonky"	Flt Lt	BR	54 Sqn		KIA 25 July 1940 when his Spitfire R6707 crashed into the sea following combat with a Bf 109.
Way, Lewis Benjamin Roger	Plt Off	BR	229 Sqn		
Wczelik, Antoni	Fg Off	POL	302 Sqn	KW**	KIA 14 April 1942
Weaver, Percy Stevenson	Fg Off	BR	56 Sqn		MIA 31 August 1940 when his Hurricane V7378 was shot down by fighters and crashed into the River Blackwater.
Webb, Paul Clifford	Fg Off	BR	602 Sqn	DFC, CBE	10 March 1918-10 July 2007
Webber, Wyndham Frederick Peirson	Plt Off	BR	141 Sqn		
Weber, Frantisek	Plt Off	CZ	145 Sqn		
Weber, Jack	Sgt	BR	1 Sqn		Died 1988
Webster, Ernest Reginald	Sgt	BR	73 Sqn		
Webster, Frederick Kinnersley	Plt Off	BR	610 Sqn		KIA 26 August 1940 (Pilot)
Webster, Herbert Garth	Sgt	BR	73 Sqn		KIA 14 April 1941
Webster, John Terence "Terry"	Fg Off	BR	41 Sqn	DFC	KIA 5 September 1940
Wedgwood, Jefferson Heywood	Flt Lt	BR	253 Sqn	DFC	KIA 17 December 1942
Wedlock, Gordon Victor	Sgt	BR	235 Sqn	DFM	
Wedzik, Marian	Sgt	POL	302 Sqn	VM, KW***, DFC	Died 10 October 1977
Weir, Archibald Nigel Charles	Plt Off	BR	45 Sqn	DFC	MIA 7 November 1940 (his brother Maj. Adrian John Anthony Weir MC was also KIA)
Welch, Eric	Sgt	BR	604 Sqn		KIA 17 December 1941
Welford, George Henry Ettrick	Plt Off	BR	607 Sqn		
Wells, Edward Preston "Hawkeye"	Plt Off	NZ	266 & 41 Sqns	DSO, DFC*	Died 2005
Wells, Patrick Hardy Vesey "Pat"	Fg Off	BR	249 Sqn	DSO	Died 2002
Wellum, Geoffrey Harris Augustus "Boy"	Plt Off	BR	92 Sqn	DFC	Died 18 July 2018 (born 1921)
Wendel, Kenneth Victor	Fg Off	NZ	504 Sqn		KIA 7 September 1940
Westlake, George Herbert	Plt Off	BR	43 & 616 Sqns	DFC	Died 18 January 2006.
Westmoreland, Thomas Emyrs	Sgt	BR	616 Sqn		MIA 25 August 1940 when he failed to return in Spitfire R6966 after combat with Bf 109s over Canterbury.
Whall, Basil Ewart Patrick	Sgt	BR	602 Sqn	DFM	KIA 7 October 1940
Wheeler, Norman John	Flt Lt	BR	610 Sqn & 615 Sqn	AFC	<www.bbm.org.uk/Wendel.htm|title=Battle of Britain London Monument >
Whipps, George Albert	Sgt	BR	602 Sqn		KIA 26 August 1941
Whitbread, Herbert Laurance	Plt Off	BR	222 Sqn		KIA 20 September 1940
White, Blair Eustace Galloway	Flt Lt	BR	504 Sqn		MIA 5 July 1943 (Malta)
White, John	Sgt	BR	72 Sqn		KIA 14 June 1941 (Egypt)
White, John William	Plt Off	BR	3 Sqn & FIU		Surviving aircrew
White, Robert	Sgt	BR	235 Sqn		Surviving aircrew
Whitehead, Clifford	Sgt	BR	56 Sqn		KIA 4 July 1942
Whitfield, Joseph James	Sgt	BR	56 Sqn		MIA 13 July 1940
Whitley, David "Bull"	Plt Off	BR	264 Sqn		KIA 28 August 1940
Whitley, Eric William	Sqn Ldr	NZ	245 Sqn (CO)	DSO, DFC	Died 25 October 1973
Whitney, Douglas Mitchell	Plt Off	NZ	245 Sqn		Died 1981
Whitsun, Alfred Daniel	Sgt	BR	236 Sqn		MIA 6 May 1941
Whittick, Harry George	Sgt	BR	604 Sqn		
Whittingham, Charles Derek	Fg Off	BR	151 Sqn		Died 8 April 1958
Whitty, William Hubert Rigby	Flt Lt	BR	607 Sqn	DFC	Died 2003 Canada
Whitwell, Peter Coulson	Sgt	BR	600 Sqn		MIA 6/7 November 1942
Wickings-Smith, Peter Claude	Plt Off	BR	235 Sqn		MIA 11 September 1940
Wickins, Arthur Stanley	Sgt	BR	141 Sqn	DFC	
Wicks, Bryan John	Fg Off	BR	56 Sqn		KIA 12 October 1942
Widdows, Stanley Charles	Sqn Ldr	BR	29 Sqn (CO)	CB, DFC	Died 10 January 2010
Wigg, Ronald George	Fg Off	NZ	65 Sqn		Died 4 August 1976
Wigglesworth, John Spencer	Plt Off	BR	238 Sqn		KIA 6 February 1942
Wight, Ronald Derek Gordon	Flt Lt	BR	213 Sqn		KIA 11 August 1940
Wightman, Owen Maurice	Mid (FAA)	BR	151 Sqn		KIA 30 June 1941
Wilcox, Charles	Sgt	BR	248 Sqn		KIA 21 May 1942
Wilcox, Edgar John	Fg Off	BR	72 Sqn		KIA 31 August 1940
Wildblood, Timothy Seddon	Plt Off	BR	152 Sqn		MIA 25 August 1940 when he failed to return in Spitfire R6994 from combat over the channel.;
Wilde, Denis Clifton	Plt Off	BR	236 Sqn		Died 1989
Wilkes, Geoffrey Norman	Sgt	BR	213 Sqn		MIA 12 August 1940
Wilkinson, Kenneth Astill	Sgt	BR	616 Sqn		Died 2017
Wilkinson, Royce Clifford	Fg Off	BR	3 Sqn	OBE, DFM*	
Wilkinson, Rodney Levett	Sqn Ldr	BR	266 Sqn		KIA 16 August 1940
Wilkinson, Wilfred Arthur	Sgt	BR	501 Sqn		
Willans, Derek Alan	Plt Off	BR	23 Sqn	DFC	KIA 28 May 1941
Willcocks, Peter Hamilton	Sgt	BR	610 & 66 Sqn		KIA 28 November 1940
Williams, Cedric Watcyn	Sqn Ldr	BR	17 Sqn		MIA 25 August 1940 after Hurricane R4199 crashed near Portland after being badly damaged in a head-on attack with a Bf 110.
Williams, Dennis Conon	Fg Off	BR	141 Sqn		KIA 4 April 1941
Williams, Desmond Gordon	Plt Off	BR	92 Sqn	DFC	KIA 10 October 1940
Williams, Eric Edward	Flt Sgt	BR	46 Sqn		MIA 15 October 1940
Williams, Gwilym Trevor	Sgt	BR	219 Sqn	OBE, DFM	
Williams, Mark Alan	Plt Off	BR	604 Sqn		
Williams, Thomas Draper	Plt Off	BR	611 Sqn	DFC	
Williams, William Dudley	Plt Off	BR	152 Sqn	DFC	Died April 1976.
Williams, Wycliff Stuart	Plt Off	NZ	Sqn		KIA 21 October 1940
Willis, Ronald Frank	AC	BR	219 Sqn		KIA 8 February 1941
Willis, William Owen	Sgt	NZ	600 Sqn		Died 23 April 1969
Wills, William Claude	Sgt	BR	3 & 73 Sqn		KIA 12 April 1941 (Libya)
Wilsdon, Albert Alfred	Sgt	BR	29 Sqn		KIA 19 December 1940
Wilson, Donald Fraser	Fg Off	NZ	141 Sqn		
Wilson, Douglas Strachan	Flt Lt	BR	610 Sqn		Died 1985
Wilson, Leonard Donald	Plt Off	BR	29 Sqn		Died 1987
Wilson, Robert Roy	Plt Off	CAN	111 Sqn		MIA 11 August 1940
Wilson, William	Sgt	BR	235 Sqn	DFM	
Wilson, William Charles	AC2	BR	29 Sqn		KIA 12 April 1941
Wilson-Macdonald, D S	Sqn Ldr	BR	213 Sqn (CO)		
Wingfield, Victor John	Sgt	BR	29 Sqn		KIA 11 May 1941
Winn, Charles Vivian	Fg Off	BR	29 Sqn	DSO, DFC	
Winskill, Archibald Little "Archie"	Plt Off	BR	72 & 603 Sqns	DFC	Died 9 August 2005
Winstanley, John	Sgt	BR	151 Sqn		
Winter, Douglas Cyril	Plt Off	BR	72 Sqn		KIA 5 September 1940
Winter, Richard Arthur	Fg Off	BR	247 Sqn		Died 1970
Wise, John Francis	Sgt	BR	141 Sqn		MIA 19 July 1940
Wiseman, William Douglas	Plt Off	BR	600 Sqn		
Wissler, Denis Heathcote	Plt Off	BR	17 Sqn		MIA 11 November 1940
Withall, Latham Carr	Flt Lt	AUS	152 Sqn		MIA 12 August 1940
Witorzenc, Stefan	Fg Off	POL	501 Sqn	VM, KW**, DFC	Died 30 December 1994 in Poland
Własnowolski, Bolesław Andrzej	Plt Off	POL	32, 607 & 213 Sqns	VM, KW	KIA 1 November 1940
Wojcicki, Antoni	Sgt	POL	213 Sqn		MIA 11 September 1940
Wojciechowski, Miroslaw I	Sgt	POL	303 Sqn	VM, KW**	
Wojtowicz, Stefan	Sgt	POL	303 Sqn	VM	KIA 11 September 1940
Wolfe, Edward Chatham	Flt Lt	BR	219 & 141 Sqns	DFC	
Wolton, Ralph	Sgt	BR	152 Sqn		
Wood, Kenneth Russell	Sgt	BR	S23 qn		KIA 10 July 1941
Wood, Stanley Victor	Sgt	BR	248 Sqn		POW 20 October 1940
Woodgate, Joseph Eric	Sgt	BR	141 Sqn		MIA 24 August 1943
Woodger, David Noel	Plt Off	BR	235 Sqn		MIA 24 August 1940
Woodhall, Alfred Basil	Wg Cdr	BR	310 Sqn	Czechoslovak Military Cross	
Woodland, Norman Naylor	Sgt	BR	236 Sqn		
Woods-Scawen, Charles Anthony "Tony"	Plt Off	BR	43 Sqn	DFC	KIA 2 September 1940
Woods-Scawen, Patrick Philip "Woody"	Fg Off	BR	85 Sqn	DFC	KIA 1 September 1940
Woodward, Herbert John	Fg Off	BR	64 & 23 Sqns	DFC	KIA 30 October 1940
Woodward, Robert Sinckler	Fg Off	BR	600 Sqn	DFC	MIA 7 December 1942
Woolley, Arthur William	Sgt	BR	601 Sqn		
Wootten, Ernest Wait "Bertie"		BR	234 Sqn	CBE, DFC*, AFC	Died 1999
Wordsworth, Douglas Kenneth Alfred	Fg Off	BR	235 Sqn	DFC	KIA 30 October 1941 (El Alamein)
Worrall, John "Barron"	Sqn Ldr	BR	32 Sqn	DFC	Retired as AVM in 1963. Died 14 January 1988
Worrall, Pyers Arthur	Plt Off	BR	85 & 249 Sqns		KIA 8 June 1942 (India) (Pilot)
Worrall, Thomas Victor	Sub Lt (FAA)	BR	111 Sqn		KIA 20 February 1941
Worsdell, Kenneth Wilson	Fg Off	BR	219 Sqn		KIA 30 October 1940 (Pilot)
Worthington, Alec Sillavan	Fg Off	BR	219 Sqn		
Wotton, Harold John	Sgt	BR	234 Sqn		KIA 25 January 1941
Wright, Alexander James	Lt (FAA)	BR	804 NAS		
Wright, Allan Richard	Fg Off	BR	92 Sqn	DFC*, AFC	Surviving aircrew (born 1920)
Wright, Daniel Leslie	Sgt	BR	235 Sqn		KIA 24 August 1940 (Wireless Operator/Air Gunner)
Wright, Eric William "Ricky"	Sgt	BR	605 Sqn	CBE DFC DFM AE	Retired as Air Cdre in 1973; died 5 November 2007
Wright, John	Sgt	BR	79 Sqn		KIA 5 September 1940 (Pilot)
Wright, William	Plt Off	BR	604 Sqn		KIA 26 August 1941
Wroblewski, Zbigniew T A	Plt Off	POL	302 Sqn	VM, KW**	
Wunsche, Kazimierz Roman	Sgt	POL	303 Sqn	VM, KW***, DFM	WIA 9 September 1940, died 1980
Wyatt, John Pile	LAC	BR	25 Sqn		KIA 15 September 1940
Wyatt-Smith, Peter	Plt Off	BR	263 Sqn		KIA 5 January 1945 (Pilot)
Wydrowski, Bronislaw	Plt Off	POL	607 Sqn		
Wynn, Richard Edward Ney Elias	Plt Off	BR	249 Sqn		KIA 7 April 1941 (Pilot)

== Y ==
Name	Rank	Nationality	Sqn during Battle	Awards	Notes
Yapp, Derek Sydney	Sqn Ldr	BR	245 & 253 Sqns	DFC*	Survived War, Captain for British Airways. Died 14 June 2012 in Devon at age 93.
Yates, Gordon	Sgt	BR	248 Sqn		4 Jun 1921-1993 Wireless Operator/Air Gunner (Blenheim)
Yates, T M	Sgt	BR	64 Sqn		
Yates, William	AC2	BR	604 Sqn		Radar Operator
York, Ronald Lewis	Sgt	BR	610 Sqn		1920-1942 KIFA 28 March 1942 (Miles Master W8640)
Young, Cecil Reginald "Charlie"	Plt Off	BR	615, 607 & 46 Sqns		KIA 5 December 1940 when Hurricane V7617 crahed near Wrotham, Kent
Young, James Harold	Plt Off	BR	234 Sqn		
Young, James Hugh Roumieu	Plt Off	BR	74 Sqn		KIA 28 July 1940 aged 22. Shot down by a Bf 109 while flying Spitfire P9547 which crashed in the Channel near Goodwin Sands.
Young, John Reginald Cass	Fg Off	BR	249 Sqn	AFC, MiD, MiD	19 Jul 1915-20 Feb 2007 Joined BOAC in 1945
Young, James Stewart	Plt Off	BR	234 Sqn		Born 1915, Canada
Young, Michael Hugh	Plt Off	BR	264 Sqn	DFC	died 1998
Young, Robert Bett Mirk	Sgt	NZ	264 Sqn		1 August 1918-8 October 1940 Air Gunner KIA while flying as an Observer in Defiant N1627 which crashed at Marlow, possibly due to enemy action. aged 22
Young, Randolph Charles	Sgt	BR	23 Sqn		Born 14 Sep 1911
Yuile, Arthur McLeod	Fg Off	CAN	1 Sqn RCAF		Born 6 June 1917 Bailed Out of Hurricane R4171 after an engagement with Dornier 17s near West Malling, Kent. Wounded in the shoulder after combat with Bf 109 and He 111 south of London on 15 September 1940, landed his damaged Hurricane L1793 at RAF Northolt.
Yule, Robert Duncan	Plt Off	NZ	145 Sqn	DSO, DFC*	2 January 1920-11 September 1953 KIFA when his Meteor F8 WF695 collided with another Meteor while avoiding a Hurricane during a Battle of Britain flypast rehearsal, crashed near Woolwich Arsenal and later died in Hospital.

== Z ==
Name	Rank	Nationality	Sqn during Battle	Awards	Notes
Zak, Walerian	Plt Off	POL	303 Sqn	VM, KW***, DFC	14 April 1911-13 March 1969 For two weeks Squadron Leader of 303 Squadron, later 308 Squadron Leader and 3rd Polish Fighter Wing Commander.
Zaluski, Jerzy	Sgt	POL	302 Sqn		16 August 1916-17 October 1940 KIA when Hurricane V7417 overturned when attempting a forced landing at Colliers End.
Zaoral, Vladimír	Plt Off	CZ	310 & 501 Sqns		5 November 1915-19 November 1941 KIA failed to recover from a spin in low cloud
Zatonski, Alexander Roman	Plt Off	AME	79 Sqn		1 November 1915 - 6 December 1941 (aged 26) MIA
Zavoral, Antonín	Sgt	CZ	1 Sqn		14 January 1917-31 May 1941 MIA Failed to return from a sortie over France
Zenker, Pawel	Plt Off	POL	501 Sqn	KW**	25 December 1914-24 August 1940 MIA in Hurricane P3141 following combat with Do 17s and Bf 109s off Dover.
Zima, Rudolf	Sgt	CZ	310 Sqn		Died 1970s
Zimprich, Stanislav	Plt Off	CZ	310 Sqn		3 March 1916-12 April 1942 KIA Collision with another Spitfire
Zukowski, Aleksiej	Plt Off	POL	302 Sqn	KW	28 March 1911-18 October 1940 KIA in Hurricane V7651 when it ran out of fuel during bad weather near Detling
Zumbach, Jan Eugeniusz Ludwig	Plt Off	POL	303 Sqn	VM, KW***, DFC*	14 Apr 1915-3 January 1986
Zurakowski, Janusz "Jan"	Plt Off	POL	234 & 609 Sqns	VM, KW**	12 September 1914-9 February 2004 Canada Post war test pilot for Gloster and Avro Canada.

== Notes on table ==
- Ranks given are those held during the Battle of Britain, although a higher rank may have been achieved after the Battle.
- All individuals listed in bold and highlighted in silver are believed to be still alive.
- Aircrew listed as KIA, MIA, WIA or KIFA during the Battle of Britain are highlighted in blue.
- The awards listed include those made during the Battle of Britain and during the remainder of World War II, as well as any made post-war.
- In order to limit the numbers of footnotes which would otherwise be required, the symbol ‡ under "Notes" indicates several entries in the text of Ramsay 1989, while the symbol † indicates that information on the circumstances under which an airman became a casualty during the Battle is included in the text of the book. Where more than one crew member of a multi place aircraft was involved this is included as a cross-reference under "Notes"
- In addition to 2,353 British aircrew, the RAF Roll of Honour recognises 574 personnel from other countries; namely:

Australia, Barbados, Belgium, Canada, Czechoslovakia, France, Ireland, Jamaica, Newfoundland, New Zealand, Poland, Rhodesia, South Africa and the United States.

=== Abbreviations ===
- (CO) after "Sqn" denotes Commanding Officer of that squadron, as per the RAF Fighter Command Order of Battle on 15 September 1940, unless otherwise indicated.
- (FAA) after a rank denotes a member of the Fleet Air Arm rather than the RAF.
- "KIA" - "killed in action"
- "KIFA" - "killed in flying accident", i.e. not during combat
- "MIA" - "missing in action".
- "WIA" - "wounded in action" leading to death which, in some cases, may have occurred months later.
- "POW" - "prisoner of war".
- For details of RAF rank abbreviations, see RAF Commissioned Officer Ranks and RAF Non-Commissioned Officer Ranks.
- For details of FAA rank abbreviations, see FAA Commissioned Officer Ranks.

=== Nationalities ===
AME	American
AUS	Australian
BEL	Belgian
BR	British
CAN	Canadian
CZ	Czechoslovak
FR	French
IRE	Irish
NZ	New Zealander
POL	Poland
RHO	Rhodesian
SA	South African

=== Awards ===
Award	Title	Notes
AE	Air Efficiency Award	Awarded for ten years' efficient service in the Royal Auxiliary Air Force
AFC	Air Force Cross	Awarded for "an act or acts of valour, courage or devotion to duty whilst flying, though not in active operations against the enemy".
CB	Companion of The Order of the Bath	Awarded at the monarch's pleasure
CDeG	Croix de Guerre	A military decoration of both France and Belgium, also commonly bestowed to foreign military forces allied to France and Belgium.
CdeL	Croix de la Libération	A decoration of France awarded for very meritorious conduct with the Free French Forces during World War II.
CdeLd'H	Croix de Légion d'honneur	A decoration of France awarded for excellent civil or military conduct delivered, upon official investigation.
CdeLL	Croix de L'Ordre de Leopold	Awarded to Belgian nationals or some distinguished foreign persons who made very important contributions to the Belgian state or society.
DFC	Distinguished Flying Cross	Awarded to Royal Air Force commissioned officers and Warrant Officers for "an act or acts of valour, courage or devotion to duty whilst flying in active operations against the enemy".
DFC*	Distinguished Flying Cross and Bar	A bar is added to the ribbon for holders of the DFC who received a second award.
DFC**	Distinguished Flying Cross and Bar	A second bar is added to the ribbon for holders of the DFC and Bar who received a third award.
DFM	Distinguished Flying Medal	Awarded to military below commissioned rank, for "an act or acts of valour, courage or devotion to duty whilst flying in active operations against the enemy".
DSO	Distinguished Service Order	Awarded for meritorious or distinguished service by officers of the armed forces during wartime, typically in actual combat.
DSO*	Distinguished Service Order and Bar	A bar is added to the ribbon for holders of the DSO who received a second award.
DSO**	Distinguished Service Order and Two Bars	A second bar is added to the ribbon for holders of the DSO and Bar who received a third award.
GCB	Knight Grand Cross of The Order of the Bath	Awarded at the monarch's pleasure
KCVO	Knight Commander of the Royal Victorian Order	Awarded for personal service to the sovereign
KStJ	Knight of the Order of Saint John	
KW	Krzyz Walecznych, Polish "Cross of Valour"	Awarded to an individual who "has demonstrated deeds of valour and courage on the field of battle."
KZ	Krzyz Zaslugi, Polish "Cross of Merit"	Awarded for exemplary public service or humanitarian work that goes above and beyond the call of duty.
MBE	Member of the Order of the British Empire	Awarded at the monarch's pleasure
MC	Military Cross	Awarded for "an act or acts of exemplary gallantry during active operations against the enemy on land to all members, of any rank".
MM	Military Medal	Awarded for acts of gallantry and devotion to duty under fire
OBE	Officer of the Order of the British Empire	Awarded at the monarch's pleasure
OStJ	Officer of the Order of Saint John	
VC	Victoria Cross	Highest British military decoration, awarded for valour in the face of the enemy.
VM	Virtuti Militari	Highest Polish military award for courage in the face of the enemy.

== See also ==
- Non-British personnel in the RAF during the Battle of Britain
- List of World War II aces from the United Kingdom
- List of World War II flying aces by country
- List of World War II flying aces
- List of RAF aircrew in the Battle of Britain (A–C)
- List of RAF aircrew in the Battle of Britain (D–F)
- List of RAF aircrew in the Battle of Britain (G–K)
- List of RAF aircrew in the Battle of Britain (L–N)
- List of RAF aircrew in the Battle of Britain (O–R)
- List of RAF aircrew in the Battle of Britain (S–U)

== Bibliography ==
- Ramsay, Winston, ed. The Battle of Britain Then and Now Mk V. London: Battle of Britain Prints International Ltd, 1989. ISBN 0-900913-46-0.
- Ringlstetter, Herbert (2005). Helmut Wick, An Illustrated Biography of the Luftwaffe Ace And Commander of Jagdgeschwader 2 During The Battle of Britain. Atglen, PA: Schiffer Publishing. ISBN 0-7643-2217-6.
- Wynn, Kenneth G, 'Men of the Battle of Britain'. Gliddon Books 1989. ISBN 0-947-893-15-6
- Wynn, Kenneth G, 'Men of the Battle of Britain (Supplementary Volume)', Gliddon Books 1992. ISBN 0-947-893-25-3
