= List of RAF aircrew in the Battle of Britain (A–C) =

The following is a list of pilots and other aircrew who flew during the Battle of Britain, and were awarded the Battle of Britain Clasp to the 1939–45 Star by flying at least one authorised operational sortie with an eligible unit of the Royal Air Force or Fleet Air Arm during the period from 0001 hours on 10 July to 2359 hours 31 October 1940.

== History ==
In 1942, the Air Ministry made the decision to compile a list from records of the names of pilots who had lost their lives as a result of the fighting during the Battle of Britain (Note: This was initially regarded as being from 8 August to 31 October 1940; however, the dates were later amended to also include those who lost their lives between 10 July and 7 August.) for the purpose of building a national memorial. This became the Battle of Britain Chapel at Westminster Abbey, which was unveiled by King George VI on 10 July 1947. The Roll of Honour within the Chapel contains the names of 1,497 pilots and aircrew killed or mortally wounded during the Battle.

Nothing was done officially, however, to define the qualifications for the classification of a Battle of Britain airman until 9 November 1960. AMO N850, published by the Air Ministry, stated for the first time the requirements for the awarding of the Battle of Britain Star, and listed the 71 units which were deemed to have been under the control of RAF Fighter Command.

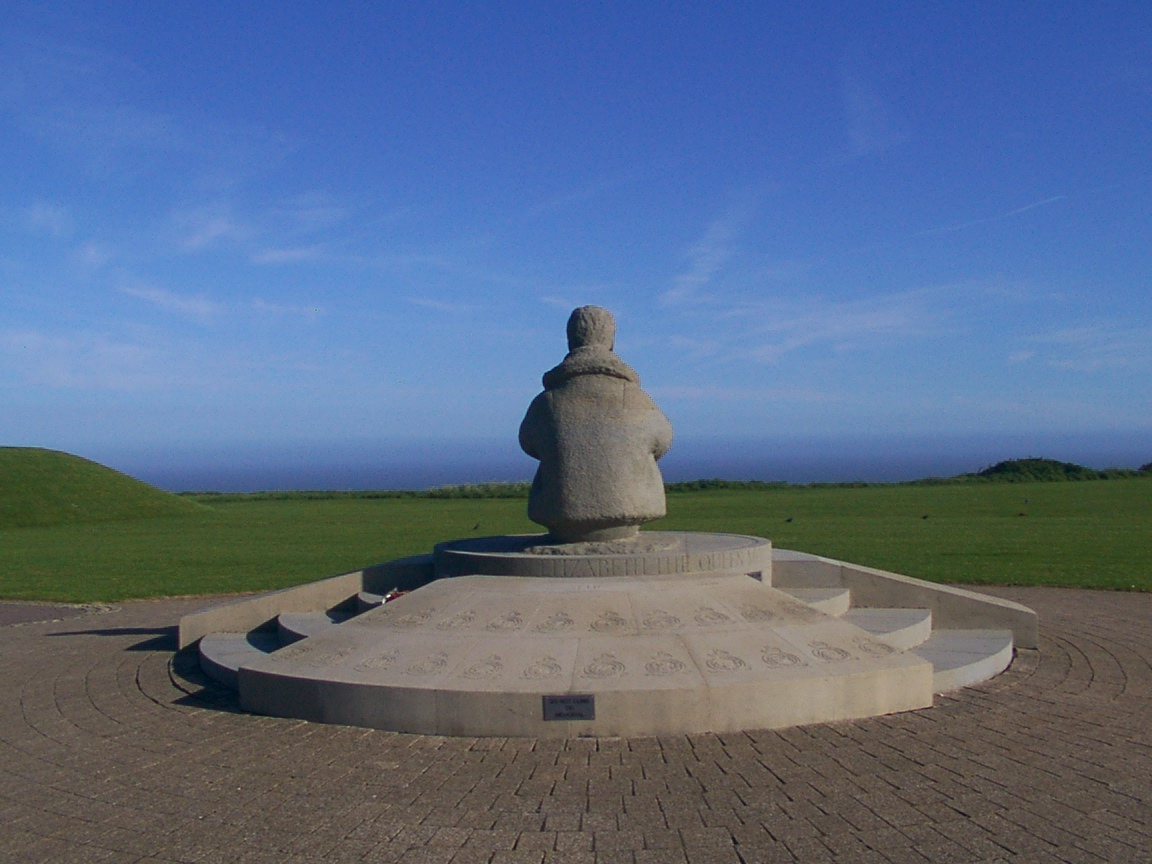
Battle of Britain Memorial at Capel-le-Ferne

In 1955 Flt Lt John Holloway, a serving RAF officer, began a personal challenge to compile a complete list of "The Few". After fourteen years of research Flt Lt Holloway had 2,946 names on the list. Of these airmen, 537 were killed during the Battle or later died of wounds received.

The Battle of Britain Memorial Trust, founded by Geoffrey Page, raised funds for the construction of the Battle of Britain Memorial at Capel-le-Ferne near Folkestone in Kent. The Memorial, unveiled by Queen Elizabeth The Queen Mother on 9 July 1993, shares the site with the Christopher Foxley-Norris Memorial Wall on which a complete list of "The Few" is engraved.

More recently, the Battle of Britain Monument on the Victoria Embankment in London was unveiled on 18 September 2005 by Their Royal Highnesses the Prince of Wales and the Duchess of Cornwall. The idea for the monument was conceived by the Battle of Britain Historical Society which then set about raising funds for its construction. The outside of the monument is lined with bronze plaques listing all the Allied airmen who took part in the Battle.

== A ==
Name	Rank	Nationality	Sqn during Battle	Awards	Notes
Adair, Hubert Hastings "Paddy	Sgt	British	213 & 151 Sqns		A pilot in a light bomber squadron during the Battle of France, transferred to Fighter Command. MIA 6 November 1940 presumed shot down.
Adams, Dennis Arthur	Plt Off	British	611 & 41 Sqn		Retired May 1958 as a Squadron Leader; died 1995
Adams, Eric Henry	Sgt	British	236 Sqn		
Adams, Hugh Charles	Plt Off	British	501 Sqn		KIA 6 September 1940 (Pilot) Shot down in combat with a Bf 109 over Ashford in Hurricane P3089
Adams, Jack Sylvester	Flt Lt	British	29 Sqn	DFC	
Adams, Reginald Thomas	Flt Sgt	British	264 Sqn		Joined 264 in September 1940. KIA 30 June 1942 over Germany as Air Gunner in No. 405 (Vancouver) Squadron RCAF
Addison, William Nathan	Sgt	British	23 Sqn	DFC DFM	
Aeberhardt, Raymond Andre Charles	Plt Off	British	19 Sqn		KIA 31 August 1940 (Pilot) Spitfire R6912 overturned and burned landing at RAF Fowlmere following combat damage to flaps.
Agazarian, Noel le Chevalier	Plt Off	British	609 Sqn		KIA 16 May 1941 (North Africa), ace with 7 victories
Aindow, Charles Robert	AC2	British	23 Sqn		Died 3 February 2010
Ainge, Eric Douglas	Sgt	British	23 Sqn		
Ainsworth, Sidney	Sgt	British	23 Sqn		
Aitken, Arthur	Sgt	British	219 Sqn		
Aitken, Henry Aloysius	Sgt	British	54 Sqn		
Aitken, Sir John William Maxwell "Max", 2nd Baron Beaverbrook	Sqn Ldr	British	601 Sqn (CO)	DSO, DFC	Died 30 April 1985
Akroyd, Harold John	Plt Off	British	152 Sqn		WIA 7 October 1940, Died 8 October 1940 Shot down in Spitfire N3039 during combat with fighters over Lyme Regis. Died the next day from burns received in the crash landing.
Albertini, Anthony Victor	Sgt	British	600 Sqn		
Aldous, Eric Stanley	Plt Off	BR	600 Sqn		KIA 16 October 1941: Hit by AA over Flushing, NL, whilst serving with 615 Sqdn.
Aldridge, Frederick Joseph	Plt Off	British	610 & 41 Sqns		Born Dublin, Ireland. Commended for Valuable Services in the Air 1945. Released from RAF 1947
Aldridge, Keith Russell	Plt Off	British	32 & 501 Sqns		
Aldwinckle, Aylmer James Martinus	Plt Off	British	601 Sqn		
Alexander, Edward Ariss	Sgt	British	236 Sqn		MIA 25 February 1941
Alexander, John William Edward	Plt Off	British	151 Sqn		
Allard, Geoffrey	Plt Off	British	85 Sqn	DFC, DFM*	KIFA 13 March 1941 (Pilot)
Allcock, Peter Owen Denys	Plt Off	British	229 Sqn		Died WIA 17 December 1941 (Egypt)
Allen, Hubert Raymond "Dizzy"	Plt Off	British	66 Sqn	DFC	Died 1987
Allen, John William	Sgt	British	266 Sqn		
Allen, John Henry Leslie	Fg Off	NZ	151 Sqn		MIA 12 July 1940 Hurricane P3275 hit by return fire from a Dornier Do 17 while protecting convoy off Orfordness. Ditched in the sea.
Allen, John Laurance	Fg Off	British	54 Sqn	DFC	KIA 24 July 1940 Spitfire R6812 crashed and burned at Cliftonville following damage to the engine in combat with Bf 109s over Margate.
Allen, Kenneth Mervyn	Flt Sgt	British	43, 257 & 253 Sqns		
Allen, Leslie Henry	Sgt	British	141 Sqn		
Allgood, Harold Henry	Sgt	British	85 & 253 Sqns		KIFA 10 October 1940 (Pilot) Hurricane L1928 of 253 Sqn crashed into houses at Albion Place, Maidstone.
Allison, Jack Whitewell	Sgt	British	611 & 41 Sqns		KIFA 15 October 1942. Commissioned August 1941; KIFA with 32 MU aged 26.
Allsop, Harold Gordon Leach	Sqn Ldr	British	66 Sqn		
Allton, Leslie Charles	Sgt	British	92 Sqn		KIFA 19 October 1940 (Pilot) Spitfire P3872 crashed at Tuesnoad Farm, Smarden.
Ambrose, Charles Francis	Plt Off	British	46 Sqn	DFC	
Ambrose, Richard	Plt Off	British	25 & 151 Sqns		KIFA 4 September 1940 (Pilot) Hurricane V7405 crashed into a crane and burned out on takeoff from Stapleford on a ferry flight.
Ambrus, Jan K	Plt Off	Czechoslovak	312 Sqn		Died 2 January 1994
Anderson, Donald John	Plt Off	British	29 Sqn		
Anderson, James Alexander	Sgt	British	253 Sqn		
Anderson, John Denis	Sgt	British	152 Sqn		
Anderson, Michael Frederic	Sqn Ldr	British	604 Sqn (CO)	DFC	
Andreae, Christopher John Drake	Fg Off	British	64 Sqn		MIA 15 August 1940 Spitfire R6990 failed to return from a combat mission against Bf 109s over the channel, Andrae missing.
Andrew, Stanley	Sgt	British	46 Sqn		KIA 11 September 1940 (Pilot) Hurricane P3325 crashed and burnt out during a patrol, cause not known.
Andrews, Maurice Raymond	Sgt	NZ	264 Sqn		
Andrews, Sydney Ernest	Plt Off	British	32 & 257 Sqns	DFM	KIFA 9 August 1942 Egypt (Pilot)
Andruszkow, Tadeusz	Sgt	POL	303 Sqn	KW	KIA 27 September 1940 Hurricane V7289 shot down in combat by Uffz. Heinirch Kopperschrager over Horsham and crashed at Holywych Farm, Cowden.
Angus, James George Colin	Sgt	British	23 Sqn		
Angus, Robert Alexander	Sgt	British	611 & 41 Sqns		MIA 20 February 1941
Appleby, Michael John	Plt Off	British	609 Sqn		
Appleford, Alexander Nelson Robin Langley	Plt Off	British	66 Sqn		
Arber, Ivor Kenneth	Sgt	British	603 Sqn	AFC	
Arbon, Paul Wade	Plt Off	British	85 Sqn	DFC	
Arbuthnott, John (Note: Born 1925. Killed Speke 4 February 1941 aged 26, flying Hawker Hurricane V7078. John Arbuthnott 564104 aged 26. He is buried in Carluke (Wilton) Cemetery, Lanarkshire, Section E, grave 89. Sergeant Arbuthnott was an ex apprentice and pre war pilot, at the start of the war he served with No 43 squadron at Tangmere and was then posted to No 1 Squadron in France, during the Battle of Britain he was posted to No 229 squadron[kittybrewster.com/members/table_13.htm])	Sgt	British	1 & 229 Sqns		KIA 4 February 1941 (Pilot)
Archer, Harold Thorpe	Sgt	British	23 Sqn		KIA 30 June 1941
Archer, Samuel	Sgt	British	236 Sqn		
Aries, Ellis Walter	Plt Off	British	602 Sqn		
Armitage, Dennis Lockhart "Tage"	Flt Lt	British	266 Sqn	DFC	Died 5 March 2004
Armitage, Joseph Fox	Sgt	British	242 Sqn		MIA 17 June 1941
Armstrong, William	Plt Off	British	54 Sqn		WIA 18 February 1943 North Africa
Arnfield, Stanley John	Sgt	British	610 Sqn		
Arthur, Charles Ian Rose	Plt Off	Canadian	141 Sqn	DFC	
Arthur, Charles John	Plt Off	British	248 Sqn		MIA 27 August 1940; Blenheim crashed into the sea during a reconnaissance mission along the south Norwegian coast, Arthur and Sgt E A Ringwood MIA; Sgt R C R Cox KIA.
Ash, Robert Clifford Vacy	Flt Lt	British	264 Sqn		KIA 28 August 1940; Defiant L7021 crashed in flames at Faversham following combat with Bf 109s; Sqn Ldr Gavin, the pilot, bailed out slightly injured, Ash baled out but was killed.(Air Gunner)
Ashcroft, Albert Edward David	Sgt	British	141 Sqn		KIA 6 October 1944
Ashfield, Glyn	Fg Off	British	FIU	AFC DFC	KIA 12 December 1942 (Pilot)
Ashton, Dennis Garth	Plt Off	British	266 Sqn		KIA 12 August 1940 Shot down in flames in Spitfire P9333 following combat with aircraft off Portsmouth. Body later recovered and buried at sea.
Ashton, Dennis Kenneth	Sgt	British	266 Sqn		KIA 26 November 1940 (Malta)
Ashworth, Jack	Sgt	British	29 Sqn		
Aslett, Arthur Thomas Reynor	Sgt	British	235 Sqn		
Aslin, Donald James	Sgt	British	257 & 32 Sqns		
Assheton, William Radclyffe	Plt Off	British	222 Sqn		
Atkins, Frederick Peter John	Sgt	British	141 Sqn		KIA 19 July 1940; Defiant L7015 shot down over the Channel following combat with Bf 109s; Plt Off R Kidson MIA, Atkins KIA. (Air Gunner)
Atkinson, Allan Arthur	Plt Off	British	23 Sqn		KIFA 30 October 1940; Blenheim L6721 crashed at South Bersted in bad weather during routine patrol. Sgt H T Perry, Plt Off H J Woodward KIFA. (Air Gunner)
Atkinson, George	Sgt	British	151 Sqn	DFM	KIFA 1 March 1945
Atkinson, Gordon Barry	Plt Off	British	248 Sqn	DFC	
Atkinson, Harold Derrick	Plt Off	British	213 Sqn	DFC	KIA 25 August 1940 (Pilot) Failed to return from combat over Warmwell in Hurricane P3200, thought to have crashed into the sea.
Atkinson, Matthew Richard	Flt Lt	British	43 Sqn		KIA 26 June 1942
Atkinson, Ronald	Plt Off	British	266, 242 and 213 Sqns		KIA 17 October 1940 (Pilot) Hurricane P3174 shot down in combat with Bf 109s and crashed at Egerton near Pluckley.
Austin, Albert Lawrence	LAC	British	604 Sqn		WIA 25 August 1940; died 26 August 1940; Blenheim L6782' crashed near Witheridge, Exeter, cause unknown; Sgts J G B Fletcher and C Haig KIA. Austin died the following day from injuries.
Austin, Anthony Thomas	Sgt	British	29 Sqn		
Austin, Frederick	Fg Off	British	46 Sqn		KIA 17 March 1941 (Pilot)
Austin, Sydney	Sgt	BR	219 Sqn	DFM	MIA 31 October 1941
Ayers, David Hart	Sgt	BR	600 & 74 Sqns		KIA 23 September 1940. Abandoned Spitfire P7362 during a routine patrol near Southwold for a cause unknown. His body later recovered from sea.
Ayling, Charles Albert Henry	Sgt	British	43, 266 Sqns & 421 Flight		(pilot) KIA 11 October 1940 when his Spitfire (P7303) crashed near Newchurch following combat over Hawkinge.

== B ==
Name	Rank	Nationality	Sqn during Battle	Awards	Notes
Babbage, Cyril Fredrick "Frank"	Sgt	BR	602 Sqn	DFM	Born Ludlow, Shropshire, 25 June 1917. Commissioned Nov 1940; retired as Wing Commander June 1964; died 1976.
Bachmann, Jack Henry	Plt Off	BR	145 Sqn		KIA 9 April 1943
Bacon, Charles Harvey	Fg Off	BR	610 Sqn		KIA 30 September 1940 Spitfire crashed on Alnmouth Beach due to a flying accident.
Baddeley, Douglas Hiram	Sgt	BR	25 Sqn		KIA OTU 26, 26 June 1942 raid over Bremen (Air Rear Gunner) Vickers Wellington 1c DV712-N
Bader, Douglas Robert Steuart	Sqn Ldr	BR	242 Sqn (CO)	CBE, DSO*, DFC*	POW 9 August 1941. Died 5 September 1982
Badger, Ivor James	Sgt	BR	87 Sqn	DFC	
Badger, John Vincent Clarence	Sqn Ldr	BR	43 Sqn (CO to 30 August 1940)	DFC	WIA 30 August 1940; Hurricane V6548 shot down in combat with Bf109s Badger seriously wounded. Died 30 June 1941. (Pilot) Awarded the RAF College Sword of Honour in 1933.
Bailey, Charles Gordon	Plt Off	BR	152 Sqn		
Bailey, Graham George	Plt Off	BR	56 Sqn		KIA 9 November 1941
Bailey, George John	Sgt	BR	234 & 603 Sqns		
Bailey, Henry Noel Dawson	Plt Off	BR	54 Sqn		
Bailey, James Richard Abe "Jim"	Plt Off	BR	264 & 85 Sqns	DFC	
Bailey, John Cyril Lindsay Dyson	Plt Off	BR	46 Sqn		KIA 2 September 1940; Hurricane P3067 shot down in combat over the Thames Estuary. (Pilot)
Baillon, Paul Abbott	Plt Off	BR	609 Sqn		KIA 28 November 1940 (Pilot)
Bain, George Stobie Preston	Plt Off	BR	111 Sqn		
Baines, Cyril Edgar Joseph	Sqn Ldr	BR	238 Sqn		
Baird, George Maurice	Flt Lt	NZ	248 Sqn		POW 20 October 1940; Blenheim P6952 shot down attacking enemy aircraft off Norwegian coast; Baird captured, Sgt D L Burton captured wounded, Sgt R Copcutt missing, W/O S V Wood captured wounded. Surviving aircrew
Baker, Aubrey Cyril	Sgt	BR	610 Sqn	DFC	
Baker, Barrie	Sgt	BR	264 Sqn		MIA 26 August 1940 (Note: Gunner Boulton Paul Defiant; Flt Lt Banham bailed out.) Defiant L6985 destroyed a Do 17 then was shot down by Bf 109s over Thanet, crashed into Herne Bay, Banham the pilot baled out and was rescued, Baker missing.
Baker, Clive Conrad Mahoney	Plt Off	BR	23 Sqn	OBE	
Baker, Eric Debnam	Sgt	BR	145 Sqn		MIA 8 August 1940 Hurricane P3381 shot down over the channel and crashed into the sea, Baker missing.
Baker, Henry Collingham "Butch"	Plt Off	BR	41 Sqn & 421 Flight		Born Worksop, Notts., 19 May 1920; Released from RAF as Squadron Leader, Jan 1946
Baker, Louis Victor	Sgt	BR	236 Sqn		
Baker, P	Plt Off	BR	600 Sqn		
Baker, Ronald David	Sgt	BR	56 Sqn		KIA 11 August 1940 (Pilot) Hurricane N2667 shot down possibly by Bf 109 and crashed into the sea, Baker baled out but died in the sea.
Baker, Stanley	Plt Off	BR	54 & 66 Sqns		MIA 11 February 1941
Baker-Falkner, Roy Sydney "Daddy"	Lt (FAA)	CAN	812 NAS	DSC, DSO	MIA 18 July 1944
Ball, George Eric	Flt Lt	BR	242 Sqn	DFC	KIFA 1 February 1946 (Pilot)
Bamberger, Cyril Stanley "Bam"	Sgt	BR	610 & 41 Sqns	DFC*	Died 3 February 2008
Bandinel, James Julius Frederick Henry	Plt Off	BR	3 Sqn		KIA 12 December 1941
Banham, Arthur John	Sqn Ldr	BR	264 & 229 Sqns (CO Oct 1940)		Defiant L6985 destroyed a Do 17 then was shot down by Bf 109s over Thanet, crashed into Herne Bay, Banham baled out and was rescued but air gunner Baker was missing.
Banister, Thomas Henry	Sgt	BR	219 Sqn	DFM	
Banks, William Henry	Sgt	BR	245, 32 & 504 Sqns		
Bann, Samuel Eric	Sgt	BR	238 Sqn		KIA 28 September 1940 (pilot) Hurricane V6776 damaged by Bf109s over Fareham, Bann baled out but was killed when parachute failed.
Baraldi, Ferdinand Henry Raphael "Jimmy"	Plt Off	BR	609 Sqn		
Baranski, Wienczyslaw	Flt Lt	POL	607 Sqn	VM, KW**	In September 1939 CO of 113 Fighter Escadrille, which defended Warsaw. Died 8 August 1970 in UK.
Barber, Robert Hugh	Plt Off	BR	46 Sqn		Died 31 March 1998
Barclay, Richard George Arthur	Plt Off	BR	249 Sqn		MIA 17 July 1942
Barker, Frederick James	Sgt	BR	264 Sqn	DFM	Died 2010?
Barker, George Leonard	Plt Off	BR	600 Sqn	DFM	KIA 18 July 1944 (Pilot)
Barker, John Keith	Sgt	BR	152 Sqn		KIA 4 September 1940 Spitfire R6909 possibly shot down by a Do 17 off Bognor, Barker baled out but was killed.
Barnard, Eric Charles	Sgt	BR	600 Sqn		
Barnes, John Guy Cardew	Fg Off	BR	600 Sqn		
Barnes, Leslie Dennis	Sgt	BR	257, 615 & 607 Sqns		
Barnes, Wilkinson	Plt Off	BR	504 Sqn		
Barnett, Richard Edgar	Sqn Ldr	BR	234 Sqn	MBE	
Baron, Rupert Victor	Plt Off	BR	219 Sqn		KIA 12 October 1940 Crew Bristol Blenheim; Sgt G M Mead Bailed out unhurt.
Barraclough, Richard George Victor	Sgt	BR	266 Sqn		
Barraclough, Stanley Michel	Sgt	BR	92 Sqn		
Barran, Philip Henry "Pip"	Flt Lt	BR	609 Sqn		KIA 11 July 1940 (Pilot) Spitfire L1069 damaged in combat with Bf109s off Portland, Barran bailed out and was rescued from the sea but died before reaching land.
Barrett, William Eric	Sgt	BR	25 Sqn		
Barron, Norman Percy Gerald	Sgt	BR	236 Sqn		
Barrow, Hector Jack Raymond	Plt Off	BR	607 & 43 Sqns		KIA 28 November 1940
Barry, Nathaniel John Merriman	Fg Off	SA	3 & 501 Sqns		KIA 7 October 1940 ¶ † (Pilot) Hurricane V6800 shot down in combat by a Bf 109 over Wrotham, crashed at Darenth.
Barthropp, Patrick Peter Colum "Paddy"	Fg Off	BR	602 Sqn		Died 16 April 2008
Bartlett, Leonard Harold	Sgt	BR	17 Sqn	DSO	Surviving aircrew (born 1916)
Bartley, Anthony Charles	Plt Off	BR	92 Sqn		Ace, 12 aircraft destroyed, Died 18 April 2001
Barton, Anthony Richard Henry	Plt Off	BR	32 & 253 Sqns		KIFA 4 April 1943
Barton, Robert Alexander "Butch"	Flt Lt	CAN	249 Sqn	OBE, DFC*	Born Kamloops, British Columbia, Canada, 7 June 1916. Retired Feb 1959 as Wing Commander; died 2 September 2010
Bartoš, Jindřich	Plt Off	CZ	312 Sqn		KIFA 13 February 1941
Barwell, Eric Gordon	Plt Off	BR	264 & 249 Sqns	DFC*, AE	Died 12 December 2007
Barwell, Philip Reginald	Wg Cdr	BR	242 Sqn	DFC	KIFA 1 July 1942 (Killed by inexperienced pilot)
Bary, Ronald Edward	Plt Off	NZ	229 Sqn		KIFA 12 April 1945
Bashford, Harry	Sgt	BR	248 Sqn		
Bassett, Francis Bernard	Fg Off	BR	222 Sqn		KIA 14 November 1942
Batchelor, Gordon Herbert (Note: Surname also spelt "Batcheloe" – CWGC website)	Plt Off	BR	54 Sqn		Shot down 9 July 1941. KIA 15 April 1942.
Batt, Leslie Gordon	Sgt	BR	238 Sqn		
Baxter, Sidney	Sgt	BR	222 Sqn		KIA 14 September 1940 (Pilot)
Bayles, Ian Norman	Fg Off	BR	152 Sqn	DFC	
Bayley, Edward Alan	Sgt	BR	32 & 249 Sqns		KIA 10 October 1940 (Pilot) Hurricane V7537 crashed at Cooling Marsh during a routine patrol, thought to be due to oxygen failure.
Bayliss, Derek	Plt Off	BR	604 Sqn		
Bayliss, Ernest John	Sgt	BR	248 Sqn		MIA 3 November 1940
Bayly, James	Sgt	NZ	111 Sqn		
Bayne, Alfred William Alexander	Flt Lt	BR	17 Sqn		
Bayne, David Walter	Sqn Ldr	BR	257 Sqn		
Baynham, Geoffery Theodore	Plt Off	BR	234 & 152 Sqns		
Bazin, James Michael	Flt Lt	Can/Pak parentage	607 Sqn	DFC DSO	Died 9 January 1985
Bazley, Sidney Howarth	Flt Lt	BR	266 Sqn		KIFA 2 March 1941
Beake, Percival Harold "Percy"	Plt Off	CAN	64 Sqn		Surviving aircrew
Beamish, Francis Victor	Wg Cdr	IRE	151, 249 & 56 Sqns	DSO*DFC AFC	MIA 28 March 1942
Beamish, Ronald	Sgt	BR	601 Sqn		
Beamont, Roland Prosper "Bee"	Fg Off	BR	87 Sqn	CBE, DSO*, DFC*	Died 19 November 2001
Beard, John Morris Bentley	Sgt	BR	249 Sqn	DFM	Died November 2000
Beardmore, Eric Walter	Plt Off	CAN	1(RCAF) Sqn		Died 23 August 1966
Beardsley, Robert Arthur "Bob"	Sgt	BR	610 & 41 Sqns	DFC	Commissioned June 1941; retired Aug 1970; died October 2003.
Beatty, Marcus Alfred	Sgt	BR	266 Sqn		
Beaumont, Stephen Gerald	Flt Lt	BR	609 Sqn		
Beaumont, Walter	Plt Off	BR	152 Sqn	DFC	MIA 23 September 1940 †(Pilot) Spitfire R7016 failed to return from operational sortie over the Channel, Beaumont missing.
Beazley, Hugh John Sherard "Beazle"	Plt Off	BR	249 Sqn		Died 13 June 2011
Beda, Antoni	Sgt	POL	302 Sqn	KW*	
Bee, Ernest Horace	Sgt	BR	29 Sqn		
Beechey, Alfred Francis	Sgt	BR	141 Sqn	DFC	
Beedham, Joseph Jeffery Ian	Plt Off	BR	245 Sqn		KIFA 7 October 1940 (Pilot) Hurricane N2707 destroyed on landing due to engine failure.
Beer, Cyril Sydney Frank	Sgt	BR	235 Sqn		KIA 10 September 1940 (Wireless Operator/Air Gunner)
Beggs, Henry William	Sub Lt (FAA)	BR	151 Sqn		KIA 15 November 1942
Bełc, Marian	Sgt	POL	303(Polish) Sqn	VM, KW***, DFC, DFM	KIFA 27 August 1942
Belchem, Leslie George	Sqn Ldr	BR	264 Sqn		KIA 14 July 1942
Beley, Robert Wilfred Garth	Plt Off	CAN	151 Sqn		KIA 12 August 1940 Hurricane P3304 shot down in combat with Bf 109s off Ramsgate, crashed into the sea and Beley was rescued but died of wounds.
Bell, Charles Algernon	Fg Off	BR	29 Sqn		
Bell, Charles Henry	Sgt	BR	234 Sqn		MIA 2 March 1941
Bell, Derek	Sgt	BR	23 Sqn		KIA 27 December 1941
Bell, John Swift	Fg Off	BR	616 Sqn		KIA 30 August 1940 Spitfire X4248 shot down in a head on attack on Bf 109s over RAF West Malling, crashed and burned.
Bell, Ralph	Sgt	BR	219 Sqn		Air Gunner
Bell-Salter, David Basil	Fg Off	BR	253 Sqn		
Bell-Walker Howard John	Sgt	BR	72 Sqn		
Benn, Gordon William	Sgt	BR	219 Sqn		
Bennett, Clarence Charles	Plt Off	AUS	248 Sqn		MIA 1 October 1940
Bennett, Hector Ernest	Sgt	BR	43 Sqn		KIA 4 February 1941
Bennette, Geoffrey Ryding	Fg Off	BR	17 Sqn		MIA 19 August 1942
Bennions, George Herman "Ben"	Plt Off	BR	41 Sqn	DFC	Born Burslem, Staffordshire, 13 March 1913. Cannon shell exploded in cockpit, 1 October 1940, blinding him in one eye and wounding his right arm and leg; baled out and hospitalised; underwent plastic surgery at Queen Victoria Hospital, East Grinstead, by facial reconstruction pioneer Dr. Archie McIndoe; became one of the founding members of McIndoe's "Guinea Pigs"; died 30 January 2004
Bennison, Alan A	Sgt	NZ	25 Sqn	AE	Surviving aircrew
Benson, James Gillies	Plt Off	BR	141 Sqn	DSO DFC*	Died 12 July 1987
Benson, Noel John Victor	Plt Off	BR	603 Sqn		KIA 28 August 1940 (Pilot) Spitfire N3105 crashed in flames at Tenterden after combat with Bf 109s.
Bent, Benjamin	Sgt	BR	25 Sqn	DFC	Surviving aircrew (born 1919)
Benzie, John	Plt Off	CAN	242 Sqn		KIA 7 September 1940 Hurricane P2962 failed to return after combat ober the Thames Estuary. Suspected crash site and remains found post war but not positively identified.
Beresford, Hugh Richard Aden	Flt Lt	BR	257 Sqn		MIA 7 September 1940 (Note: An archaeological dig in September 1979 unearthed the wreckage of a Hurricane and the pilot's remains. Beresford was buried with full military honours at Brookwood Military Cemetery, 16 November 1979.)(Pilot) Hurricane P3049 shot down in combat over the Thames Estuary and crashed as Sheppey.
Bergman, Václav	Plt Off	CZ	310(Czech) Sqn		Died 31 December 2002
Berkley, Thomas Colqhoun Edmonds	Sgt	BR	85 Sqn		MIA 14 June 1941
Bernard, Frantisek Antonin	Sgt	CZ	238 & 601 Sqns		Died 17 June 1980
Bernas, Bronislaw	Plt Off	POL	302(Polish) Sqn		
Berridge, Horace Walter	Sgt	BR	219 Sqn	DFC*	
Berry, Alan	Sgt	BR	264 Sqn		MIA 24 August 1940 (Note: Air Gunner Boulton Paul Defiant; Plt Off I G Shaw MIA.)
Berry, Frederick George	Flt Sgt	BR	1 Sqn	DFM	KIA 1 September 1940 (Pilot)
Berry, Ronald	Plt Off	BR	603 Sqn	CBE, DSO, DFC*	
Berwick, Robert Charles	Sgt	BR	25 Sqn		KIA 19 June 1941
Beveridge, Charles	Sgt	BR	219 Sqn		
Beytagh, Michael Leo	Sqn Ldr	BR	73 Sqn (CO)		
Bickerdike, John Laurence	Plt Off	NZ	85 Sqn		KIFA 22 July 1940 (during aerobatics) † (Pilot) Hurricane P3895 crashed prior to landing at Caste Camps aerodrome.
Bicknell, N	Sgt	BR	23 Sqn		No details after Jul 1940
Bicknell, Leslie Charles	Sqn Ldr	BR	23 Sqn		
Bidgood, Eric George	Plt Off	BR	253 Sqn		MIA 16 November 1940
Bidgood, Ivor Kenneth Jack	Sgt	BR	213 Sqn		KIA 2 June 1941
Biggar, Arthur James	Sqn Ldr	BR	111 Sqn		
Bignall, John Edward	Sgt	BR	25 Sqn		KIA 4 September 1941
Binham, Arthur Edward	Sgt	BR	64 Sqn		
Birch, Colin Norman	Plt Off	BR	1 Sqn	AFC	
Birch, Raymond Robert Grenville	Sgt	BR	19 Sqn		KIFA 13 July 1940 (Pilot) Spitfire R6688 stalled during dogfight training and crashed and burned at Balsham.
Bird, Ronald Arthur	Lt (FAA)	BR	804 NAS		
Bird-Wilson, Harold Arthur Cooper	Plt Off	BR	17 Sqn	CBE, DSO*, DFC*, DFC(Netherlands), MoM1 (Czech), AFC*	¶ AVM 1970. Died 27 December 2000.
Birkett, Thomas	Plt Off	BR	219 Sqn		KIA 13 November 1940
Birrell, Maurice Andrew	Mid (FAA)	BR	804 NAS & 79 Sqn		
Bisdee, John Derek	Plt Off	BR	609 Sqn	OBE, DFC	Became Gp Capt. Died 21 October 2000
Bisgood, Douglas Leonard	Plt Off	BR	3 Sqn	DFC	
Bitmead, Ernest Ralph	Sqn Ldr	BR	266 & 310 Sqns; 253 Sqn (CO)	DFC	
Black, Allan	Sgt	BR	54 Sqn		KIA 1 February 1944
Black, Herbert Ernest Bert	Sgt	BR	46, 257 & 32 Sqns		WIA 29 October 1940; Died 9 November 1940 †(Pilot) Hurricane shot down in combat with Bf 109s and crashed and burned near Ashford, Black badly wounded and died 9 November 1940.
Blackadder, William Francis	Flt Lt	BR	607 Sqn	OBE DSO	Born 23 January 1913 – Died 21 November 1997
Blackwood, George Douglas Morant	Sqn Ldr	BR	213 Sqn & 310 Sqn (CO)		Died 2 March 1997
Blair, Charles Ernest	Plt Off	BR	600 Sqn		KIA 25 April 1941
Blair, Kenneth	Flt Lt	BR	151 Sqn		Died 31 October 1953
Blaize, Pierre Michel	Plt Off	FR	111 Sqn		
Blake, Arthur Giles "Admiral"	Sub Lt (FAA)	BR	19 Sqn		KIA 29 October 1940 (Pilot) Believed attacked by a Bf 109 in his Spitfire P7423 during a patrol over London and crashed at Chelmsford.
Blake, Minden Vaughn "Mindy"	Sqn Ldr	NZ	238 Sqn(CO Aug) & 234 Sqn (CO September)		POW, (Wg Cdr) 19 August 1942 (Dieppe raid)
Bland, John Wellburn	Plt Off	BR	601 Sqn & 501 Sqn		KIA 18 August 1940 (Pilot) Hurricane P3208 crashed following attack by a JG26 pilot.
Blane, William Higgins	Sgt	BR	604 Sqn		
Blatchford, Howard Peter "Cowboy"	Flt Lt	CAN	17 & 257 Sqn	DFC	MIA 3 May 1943, (Wg Cdr) shot down in combat over Netherlands; aged 31; Born Edmonton, Alberta, Canada, 25 February 1912; son of Kenneth A. and Grace L. Blatchford, of Edmonton, Alberta, Canada; remembered on Panel 118 of the Runnymede Memorial. Shared 41 Squadron's first World War II victory, a He 111, with Sgts. E. A. Shipman & A. Harris on 17 October 1939;
Blayney, Adolf Jarvis	Plt Off	BR	609 Sqn		
Blenkharn, Frank	Sgt	BR	25 Sqn		
Bloomeley, David Henry	Plt Off	BR	151 Sqn		
Bloor, Ernest	Sgt	BR	46 Sqn		Born in Leeds
Blow, Kenneth Leslie Owen	Sgt	BR	235 Sqn		
Boddington, Michael Christopher Bindloss	Sgt	BR	234 Sqn		
Bodie, Crelin Arthur W "Bogle"	Plt Off	BR	66 Sqn	DFC	KIFA 24 February 1942
Boitel-Gill, Derek Pierre Aumale	Flt Lt	BR	152 Sqn	DFC 22 October 1940	KIFA 18 September 1941 (Wg Cdr)
Bolton, Henry Albert	Sgt	BR	No. 79 Squadron RAF		KIA 31 August 1940. Shot down in combat over RAF Kenley and crashed attempting a forced landing at Warlingham) †(Pilot)
Bon Seigneur, Camille Robespeirre	Plt Off	CAN	257 Sqn		KIA 3 September 1940 (Pilot)
Boot, Peter Victor	Plt Off	BR	1 Sqn		
Booth, Glendon Bulmer	Sgt	BR	46 Sqn		WIA 31 August 1940; Died 7 February 1941 (Pilot)
Booth, John James	Sqn Ldr	BR	23 Sqn & 600 Sqn		Air Gunner
Boret, Robert John	Plt Off	BR	41 Sqn		MIA 16 November 1940 (216 Sqn) when aircraft ran out of fuel at sea between HMS Argus and Malta; aged 20; Born London, 8 November 1919; son of Air Cdr. John A. Boret, CBE, MC, AFC, who commanded 41 Squadron from May 1933 – Mar 1937; remembered on Panel 7 of the Runnymede Memorial.
Borowski, Jan	Fg Off	POL	302(Polish) Sqn	VM	KIFA 18 October 1940 (Pilot) Hurricane P3930 crashed and burned at Kempton Park race course in bad weather returning from a patrol.
Boswell, Reginald Arthur	Sgt	BR	19 Sqn		
Boulding, Roger John Eric	Fg Off	BR	74 Sqn		
Boulter, John Clifford	Fg Off	BR	603 Sqn		KIA 17 February 1941
Boulton, John Eric	Plt Off	BR	603 Sqn & 310 Sqn		KIA 9 September 1940 (Pilot) (Note: Lost control following collision with Flt Lt G L Sinclair; hit He 111 of III.KG/53 amidships and crashed. He 111 destroyed.)
Boquillard, Henri Jacques	Adjutant	BR	615 Sqn & 249 Sqn		KIA 11 March 1941
Bowen, Charles Earle	Flt Lt	BR	607 Sqn		KIA 1 October 1940 (Pilot) Hurricane P2900 shot down in combat with Bf 110ss over the Isle of Wight, Bowen missing.
Bowen, Nigel Greenstreet	Plt Off	BR	266 Sqn		KIA 16 August 1940 (Pilot)
Bowen, Peter Duncan	Plt Off	BR	264 Sqn		MIA 13 February 1944
Bowen-Morris, Hugh	Sgt	BR	92 Sqn		
Bowerman, Oswald Robert	Sgt	BR	222 Sqn	MiD	KIA 24 October 1942
Bowman, Leonard Douglas	Sgt	BR	141 Sqn		
Bowring, Benjamin Harvey	Fg Off	BR	111 Sqn & 600 Sqn		
Bowyer, Walter Stafford	Flt Lt	SA	257 Sqn		KIA 24 January 1942
Boyd, Adrian Hope "Ginger"	Flt Lt	BR	145 Sqn(Acting CO 8 August 1940)	DSO, DFC*(Jun, Aug 1940)	Died 21 January 1975
Boyd, Archibald Douglas McNeill	Fg Off	BR	600 Sqn	DSO, DFC	Died 4 April 2014
Boyd, Robert Finlay	Flt Lt	BR	602 Sqn		
Boyle, Cyril	Sgt	BR	236 Sqn		
Boyle, John Greer "Beryl"	Fg Off	CAN	41 Sqn		KIA 28 September 1940, aged 26. Born Casselman, Ontario, Canada, 27 March 1914 (Pilot)
Braham, John Randall Daniel "Bob"	Sqn Ldr	BR	29 Sqn	DSO**, DFC**, AFC	Died 7 February 1974
Bramah, Henry George Kenelm	Sub Lt (FAA)	BR	213 Sqn		
Branch, Guy Rawstron	Fg Off	BR	145 Sqn	EGM (George Cross, 1937)	KIA 11 August 1940 (Pilot)
Brash, George Brown	Sgt	BR	248 Sqn		MIA 1 October 1940
Breeze, Reginald Arthur	Sgt	BR	222 Sqn		KIA 28 January 1945
Brejcha, Václav	Sgt	CZ	43 Sqn		KIA 19 June 1941
Brennan, Jack Stephen	Sgt	NZ	23 Sqn		KIA 21 August 1940 (ground accident)
Brett, Colin Peter Noel	Fg Off	BR	17 Sqn		
Brewster, John	Fg Off	BR	615 Sqn & 616 Sqn		KIA 6 April 1941
Briere, Yves J	Plt Off	FR	232 Sqn		MIA 14 May 1941
Briese, Carl E	Fg Off	CAN	1(RCAF) Sqn		
Briggs, Dennis Rushworth	Sgt	BR	236 Sqn		KIA 21 December 1940
Bright, Vernon Maxwell	Plt Off	BR	229 Sqn		KIA 24 September 1942
Brimble, George William	Sgt	BR	242 Sqn		KIA 1 December 1940
Brimble, John Joseph	Sgt	BR	73 Sqn		KIA 14 September 1940 †(Pilot)
Brinsden, Francis Noel	Fg Off	NZ	19 Sqn		POW 17 August 1943. Retired RAF (Wg Cdr) 1966.
Britton, Allen Walter Naylor	Fg Off	BR	263 Sqn		MIA 12 December 1940
Britton, Henry Wilfred Arthur	Plt Off	BR	17 Sqn		KIA 6 August 1940 (Pilot)
Broadhurst, Harry	Wg Cdr	BR	1 Sqn	GCB, KBE, DSO*, DFC*, AFC	Died 29 August 1995
Broadhurst, John William	Plt Off	BR	222 Sqn		KIA 7 October 1940 (Pilot)
Brooker, Robert Edgar Peter	Fg Off	BR	56 Sqn	DSO*, DFC*	KIA 16 April 1945 (Wg Cdr)
Brothers, Peter Malam	Flt Lt	BR	32 & 257 Sqns	DSO, DFC*	Died 18 December 2008
Brown, Archibald Wilkinson	Plt Off	BR	25 Sqn		Air Gunner
Brown, A E	Sgt	BR	234 Sqn		
Brown, Bernard Walter	Plt Off	NZ	610 & 72 Sqns		Died 23 January 2017
Brown, Cyril Bob	Sgt	BR	245 Sqn		
Brown, Charles Walter Dryburgh	Sgt	BR	236 Sqn		KIA 30 June 1941
Brown, D M	Fg Off	BR	1 Sqn		
Brown, De Peyster	Plt Off	AME	601 Sqn		Died 3 August 1991 ¶
Brown, Frederick Sydney	FSgt	BR	79 Sqn		
Brown, George Alfred	Fg Off	BR	253 Sqn		
Brown, James Wood	Sgt	BR	600 Sqn		KIA 22 November 1943
Brown, Mark Henry "Hilly"	Fg Off	CAN	1 Sqn	DFC*, MC (Czech)	KIA 12 November 1941 (Sicily)
Brown, Marvin Kitchener	Plt Off	CAN	242 Sqn		KIA 21 February 1941
Brown, Maurice Peter	Fg Off	BR	611 & 41 Sqns	AFC	Died 20 January 2011
Brown, Norman McHardy	Plt Off	BR	611 & 41 Sqns	AFC	Surviving aircrew Born Edinburgh, Scotland, 1919. Commission terminated on completion of service, 12 April 1941
Brown, Ronald Clifford	Fg Off	BR	229 Sqn		
Brown, Robert John Walker	Plt Off	BR	111 Sqn		¶
Brown, Robert Sydney	AC2	BR	604 Sqn		Radar Operator - Died 2010?
Browne, Charles	Sgt	BR	219 Sqn		
Browne, Dennis Owen Matthew	Plt Off	BR	1 Sqn		MIA 16 August 1940
Bruce, David Campbell	Fg Off	BR	111 Sqn		MIA 4 September 1940
Brumby, Norman	Sgt	BR	615 & 607 Sqns		KIA 1 October 1940 Hurricane V6686 shot down in combat with Bf 109s over the Isle of Wight.
Brunner, Geoffrey Clifford	Plt Off	BR	43 Sqn	AFC*	retired as Group Captain, died 1989
Bryant, R F	Mid (FAA)	BR	? Sqn		No Service Details Known
Bryant-Fenn, Leofric Trevor	Fg Off	BR	79 Sqn		
Bryson, John Samuel	Plt Off	CAN	92 Sqn		KIA 24 September 1940
Brzezina, Stanislaw	Flt Lt	POL	74 Sqn	VM, KW	Died, in rank of Colonel, 13 February 1946 in crash of Douglas DC-3 Dakota in Orpington near London.
Brzezowski, Michal	Sgt	POL	303 Sqn	KW	MIA 15 September 1940
Buchin, Maurice Simon Henri Charles	Plt Off	BEL	213 Sqn		MIA 15 August 1940 ¶
Buck, James Allen	Sgt	BR	43 Sqn		KIA 19 July 1940 (drowned)
Bucknole, John Stanley	Sgt	BR	54 Sqn		KIA 25 July 1941
Budd, George Oliver	Flt Lt	BR	604 Sqn		
Budzinski, Jan	Sgt	POL	605 & 145 Sqns	KW*	Died 26 August 2007 in Spring, Texas, USA
Bull, Cecil Halford	Flt Lt	BR	25 Sqn		KIA 8 August 1940
Bull, John Cecil	Plt Off	BR	600 Sqn		
Bulmer, Geoffrey Gordon Robinson	Sub Lt (FAA)	BR	32 Sqn		MIA 20 July 1940; HMS Daedalus
Bumstead, Ronald Frederick	Sgt	BR	111 Sqn		
Bunch, Douglas Campbell	Sgt	BR	219 Sqn		1920-1972 Radar Operator
Bunch Samuel Hoskin	Sun Lt (FAA)	BR	804 Sqn		KIA 11 May 1941; HMS Condor
Bungey, Robert Wilton	Fg Off	AU	145 Sqn	DFC	Committed suicide 10 June 1943 Adelaide, Australia
Burda, Frantisek	Plt Off	CZ	310 Sqn		Died 23 February 1988.
Burdekin, Alan George	Sgt	BR	600 Sqn		Air Gunner
Burgess, John Henry Bateman	Sgt	BR	222 Sqn		1920-1988
Burgoyne, Eric	Plt Off	BR	19 Sqn		KIA 27 September 1940
Burley, Peter Slater	Sgt	BR	600 Sqn		
Burnard, Fred Percy	Flt Sgt	BR	74 & 616 Sqns		
Burnell-Phillips, Peter Anthony	Sgt	BR	607 Sqn	DFM	KIFA 9 February 1941
Burnett, Norman Whitmore	Fg Off	BR	266 & 46 Sqns		MIA 11 June 1941
Burns, Owen V "OV"	Sgt	BR	235 Sqn		Surviving aircrew
Burton, D L	Sgt	NZ	248 Sqn		POW 20 October 1940; Blenheim P6952 shot down attacking enemy aircraft off Norwegian coast; Flt Lt G M Baird captured, Burton captured wounded, Sgt R Copcutt missing, W/O S V Wood captured wounded.
Burton, Howard Frizelle "Billy"	Flt Lt	BR	66 Sqn & 616 Sqns (CO)		
Burton, Leslie Gilbert	Plt Off	BR	236 Sqn		KIA 24 December 1941 (Observer)
Burton, Percival Ross Frances	Fg Off	SA	249 Sqn		KIA 27 September 1940
Bury-Burzymski, Jan	Plt Off	POL	303 Sqn	VM	KIA 24 October 1940
Bush, Basil Martin	Sgt	BR	504 Sqn		
Bush, Charles Roy	Plt Off	NZ	242 Sqn	DFC	KIFA 30 November 1948 in Ruahines, during photographic reconnaissance in Gisborne area of NZ. Born Wellington, New Zealand, 7 February 1918.
Bushell, Gordon Downs	Sgt	BR	213 Sqn		KIA 31 December 1940 (Pilot)
Butterfield, Samuel Leslie	Sgt	BR	213 Sqn	DFM	KIA 11 August 1940 (Pilot)
Butterick, Alec Frank	Sgt	BR	232 Sqn		
Butterworth, Kenneth	AC2	BR	23 Sqn		
Byng-Hall, Percy	Plt Off	CAN	29 Sqn		
Byrne, Edward Leslie "Paddy"	W/O	BR	FIU		POW 13 September 1940; Blenheim Z5721 crashed in Channel off Calais during night patrol (circumstances unknown); Flt Lt Ker-Ramsay, W/O George Dixon and Byrne baled out and were captured. KIA 24 July 1943 (Pilot)

== C ==
Name	Rank	Nationality	Sqn during Battle	Awards	Notes
Cain, Anthony Richard	Sgt	BR	235 Sqn		KIA 15 June 1941 (Wireless Operator)
Caister, James Russell	Plt Off	BR	603 Sqn		Official Ace
Calderhead, George Douglas	Plt Off	BR	54 Sqn		KIA 12 January 1942
Calderwood, Thomas Morrow	Sgt	BR	85 Sqn		Died 28 September 1957
Cale, Francis Walter	Plt Off	AUS	266 Sqn		KIA 15 August 1940
Calthorpe	Sgt	BR	25 Sqn		
Cambridge, William Percival	Flt Lt	BR	253 Sqn		KIA 6 September 1940 (Pilot)
Cameron, James Douglas	Sgt	BR	604 Sqn		KIA 9 May 1942 (Wireless Operator/Air Gunner)
Cameron, Matthew	Flt Sgt	BR	66 Sqn		
Cameron, Neil	Sgt	BR	1 & 17 Sqns	KT, GCB, CBE, DSO, DFC	Official Ace Died 29 January 1985
Campbell, Alan	Sgt	NZ	264 Sqn		KIA 29 July 1942
Campbell, Alexander Middleton	Flt Lt	BR	29 Sqn		Died 1974
Campbell, Alan Robert McLeod	Plt Off	CAN	54 Sqn		Died September 1974
Campbell, David Baillie	Sgt	NZ	23 Sqn		Died June 1984
Campbell, Donald Cairnie O	Sgt	BR	66 Sqn		KIA Sep 1940, Details not known.
Campbell, Gillian Lorne	Plt Off	BR	236 Sqn	DFC	KIA 23 December 1942
Campbell, Kenneth Charles	Plt Off	BR	43 Sqn		KIA 29 July 1940
Campbell, Norman Neil	Plt Off	CAN	242 Sqn		KIA 17 October 1940 (Pilot)
Campbell-Colquhoun, Ernest William	Flt Lt	BR	264 & 66 Sqns		Died 1989
Candy, Robert John	Plt Off	BR	25 Sqn		
Canham, Arthur William	Sgt	BR	600 Sqn		
Cannon, Bernard	Sgt	BR	604 Sqn		Died 17 September 1983
Capel, Bernard	Sgt	BR	23 Sqn		
Capon, Cardale Frederick Alexander	Plt Off	BR	257 Sqn		KIA 1 January 1941 (Pilot). Joined 257 Squadron on 17 May 1940. Claimed a He 111 destroyed on 12 August and a Ju 88 the next day. On 12 October was shot down in Hurricane V2798 in combat with Me 109's over Dungeness. From September 1940 Capon always flew as No 2 to Sqn Ldr Tuck. On 1 January 1941, after flying a night patrol, Capon was killed landing in a snow blizzard at Coltishall
Capstick, Herbert	Plt Off	Jamaican	236 Sqn		
Carbury, Brian John George	Fg Off	NZ	603 Sqn	DFC*	Born Wellington, New Zealand, 27 February 1918. Court-martialled and dismissed from RAF, Oct 1941, possibly due to bounced cheques; died UK Jul 1962
Cardell, Philip Melville	Plt Off	BR	603 Sqn		KIA 27 September 1940 (Pilot)
Cardnell, Charles Frederick	Plt Off	BR	23 Sqn		KIA 8 August 1940 (Pilot)
Carey, Frank Reginald	Flt Lt	BR	43 Sqn	DFC**, AFC, DFM	Official Ace, Died 6 December 2004
Carlin, Sydney "Timbertoes"	Plt Off	BR	264 Sqn	MC, DFC, DCM	KIA 9 May 1941
Carnaby, William Fleming	Fg Off	BR	264 & 85 Sqns		KIA 5 February 1943 (Pilot)
Carnall, Ralph	Sgt	BR	111 Sqn		Died 1984
Carpenter, Jack Conway	Sub Lt (FAA)	BR	229 & 46 Sqn		KIA 8 September 1940
Carpenter, John Michael Vowles	Plt Off	BR	222 Sqn		
Carr, William Joseph	Fg Off	BR	235 Sqn	AFC	KIA 26 August 1942
Carr-Lewty, Robert Albert	Sgt	BR	41 Sqn	AFC	Born Bradford, Yorkshire, 6 July 1911. Relinquished commission, Jul 1956, retaining Flt Lt; became Doctor; died 1997
Carriere, Jean Charles	Plt Off	CAN	219 Sqn	DFC	
Carswell, Malcolm Keith	Fg Off	NZ	43 Sqn		Died 7 July 2003
Carter, Laurence Richmond	Sgt	BR	610 & 41 Sqn		MIA 6 July 1941
Carter, Peter Edward George	Plt Off	BR	73 & 302 Sqn		KIA 18 October 1940. Died just 250 y from Borowski, who was his wingsman. Most tragic flight of 302 squadron. Scrambled in bad weather against Messerschmitts. Four ! pilots of 302 died in just one sortie hitting the ground: Borowski, Carter, Wapniarek, Zukowski. P/O Carter probably, as Borowski, was posthumously awarded with VM.Pupil at St Joseph's college, South Croydon, London 1928–30. D.O.B 4 May 1919
Carter, Victor Arthur	Plt Off	BR	607 Sqn		
Carthew, Gerald Charles Trewalla	Plt Off	CAN	253, 85 & 145 Sqns		Surviving aircrew
Carver, John Champion	Fg Off	BR	87 Sqn	DFC	MIA 6 June 1942
Carver, Kenneth Maltby	Plt Off	BR	229 Sqn		
Carver, Rodney Harold Power	Lt (FAA)	BR	804 NAS		
Case, Herbert Robert	Plt Off	BR	34 & 72 Sqns		KIA 12 October 1940
Cassidy, Ernest	Fg Off	BR	25 Sqn	DFC	
Casson, Lionel Harwood "Buck"	Plt Off	BR	79 & 616 Sqns	DFC, AFC, AE*	Official Ace Died 8 October 2003
Castle, Colin Ewart Patrick	Sgt	BR	219 Sqn		KIA 13 November 1940 (Air Gunner)
Cave, John Geoffry	Plt Off	BR	600 Sqn		Died 1962
Cawse, Frederick Norman	Plt Off	BR	238 Sqn		KIA 11 August 1940 (Pilot)
Cebrzynskli, Arsen	Fg Off	POL	302 Sqn	KW*	WIA 11 September 1940; Died 19 September 1940
Chábera, František	Sgt	CZ	312 Sqn		Died 21 October 1999
Chadwick, Dennis Frederick	Sgt	BR	64 Sqn		Died 1973
Chaffe, Ronald Ivor	Plt Off	BR	245 & 43 Sqn		KIA 22 February 1942
Chalder, Harry Hutchinson	Plt Off	BR	266 & 41 Sqn		Born Newcastle upon Tyne 1915. Seriously WIA 28 September 1940; Died of wounds 10 November 1940 Halton Hospital.
Chaloner Lindsey, Patrick	Plt Off	BR	601 Sqn		KIA 26 July 1940
Chalupa, Stanislaw Jozef	Plt Off	POL	302 Sqn	VM, KW, CdG	His CdG from 1940 received in 2000. Died 24 April 2004 in Katowice, buried in Kraków.
Chamberlain, George Philip	Wg Cdr	BR	FIU		
Chamberlain, Joseph Thomas Ronald	Plt Off	BR	235 Sqn		Surviving aircrew
Chandler, Horatio Herbert	Sgt	BR	610 Sqn		Official Ace
Chapman, Victor Ronald	Sgt	BR	264 Sqn		
Chappell, Alan Kingsley	Plt Off	BR	236 Sqn		
Chappell, Charles Gordon	Fg Off	BR	65 & 609 Sqns		Born Manchester, 7 September 1915. Commissioned May 1938; relinquished commission April 1965
Chapple, Douglas William Ernest	Sgt	BR	236 Sqn		KIA 28 June 1941
Chard, Wilfred Thomas	Sgt	BR	141 Sqn		
Charles, Edward Francis John "Jack"	Fg Off	CAN	54 Sqn	DSO, DFC*	Died 5 November 1986
Charnock, Gerard	AC2	BR	25 Sqn		Believed KIA 5 June 1941
Charnock, Harry Walpole	Sgt	BR	64 & 19 Sqns	DFC, DFM, CdeG	Born Chorley, Lancashire, 20 June 1905. Commissioned on graduation from RAF College Cranwell, December 1925; cashiered by General Court Martial for low flying, December 1930; re-joined RAFVR as NCO pilot, September 1939; re-commissioned January 1943; relinquished commission, January 1955; Also awarded Belgian Knight in the Order of Leopold. Died 24 May 1974
Chater, George Frederick	Sqn Ldr	SA	247 Sqn (CO) & 3 Sqn	DFC	
Cheetham, John Cowper	Sgt	BR	23 Sqn		KIA 15 July 1944
Chelmecki, Marian	Plt Off	POL	56 & 17 Sqns	VM, KW**	Died 28 March 1988
Chesters, Peter	Plt Off	BR	74 Sqn		KIFA 10 April 1941
Chetham, Charles Arthur Copeland	Plt Off	BR	1 Sqn		KIA 15 April 1941
Chevrier, Joseph Armand Jacques	Plt Off	CAN	1 Sqn		MIA 6 July 1942; ADC to His Excellency the Governor General, the Earl of Athlone, from 1 August 1941 to 31 March 1942.
Chew, Clifford Archibald	Sgt	BR	17 Sqn	AFC	KIA 24 March 1945
Chignell, Robert Alexander	Wg Cdr	BR	145 Sqn	MiD	KIA 14 February 1942
Chiltern, Patrick Charles Stuart	Sub Lt (FAA)	BR	804 Sqn		Also spelt "Chilton"
Chipping, Douglas James	Sgt	BR	222 Sqn		Died 1985
Chisholm, Roderick Aeneus	Plt Off	BR	604 Sqn	DSO, DFC	Later Air Cdre; died 1994
Chlopik, Tadeusz P	Flt Lt	POL	302 Sqn	KW*	KIA 15 September 1940
Chomley, John Allison George	Plt Off	RHO	257 Sqn		MIA 12 August 1940
Choran, Maurice Philipe Cesar	Adj	FR	64 Sqn		MIA 10 April 1942
Christie, George Patterson	Fg Off	CAN	242 & 66 Sqns	DFC*	KIA 6 July 1942
Christie, John McBean	Sgt	BR	152 Sqn		KIA 26 September 1940
Christmas, Beverley E	Plt Off	CAN	1 Sqn RCAF		17 May 1988
Chrystal(l), Colin	Sgt	NZ	235 Sqn		Killed 28 July 1961
Churches, Edward Walter Gillies	Plt Off	NZ	74 Sqn		MIA 19 April 1941
Churchill, Walter Myers	Sqn Ldr	BR	605 Sqn (CO)	DSO DFC	1907–1942 KIA 27 August 1942
Čízek, Evžen	Plt Off	CZ	1 Sqn		KIFA 26 November 1942 (By then a Gp Capt)
Clackson, David Lawrence	Flt Lt	BR	600 Sqn	MBE	
Clandillon, James Albert	Sgt	BR	219 Sqn		KIA 18 February 1943
Clark, Colin Anthony Gordon	Plt Off	SA	FIU		KIA 30 October 1941
Clark, David de Brassey	Sqn Ldr	BR	600 Sqn	CBE	
Clark, Godfrey Percival	Sgt	BR	604 Sqn	DFC	
Clark, Henry Reginald	Flt Lt	BR	66 & 610 Sqns		Surviving aircrew
Clark, William Terence Montague "Terry"	Sgt	BR	219 Sqn	DFM	Surviving aircrew Beaufighter radar navigator.
Clarke, Arthur William	Plt Off	BR	504 Sqn		KIA 11 September1940
Clarke, Gordon Stuart	Sgt	BR	248 Sqn		MIA 1 October 1940
Clarke, Gordon Thomas	Sgt	BR	151 Sqn	AFC	KIFA 11 August 1953
Clarke, Henry Reginald	Sgt	BR	66 & 610 Sqns	AE	(1918–26 July 2010)
Clarke, Ronald Neville	Sqn Ldr	BR	235 Sqn	DFC	Possibly KIA 4 March 1941
Clarke, Raymond Walter	Fg Off	BR	79 & 238 Sqns		MIA 16 November 1940
Cleaver, Gordon Neil S "Mouse"	Fg Off	BR	610 Sqn	DFC	Official Ace Died 1994
Clenshaw, Ian Charles Cooper	Sgt	BR	253 Sqn		KIA 10 July 1940; First Casualty of the Battle of Britain,
Clerke, Rupert Francis Henry	Flt Lt	BR	32 & 79 Sqns	DFC	
Clift, Douglas Gerald "Duggie"	Fg Off	BR	79 Sqn		Official Ace Died 2008
Clifton, John Kenneth Graham	Plt Off	BR	253 Sqn		KIA 1 September 1940
Clouston, Arthur Edmond	Sqn Ldr	NZ	219 Sqn	DSO, DFC, AFC	
Clouston, Wilfred Greville	Fg Off	NZ	19 Sqn	DFC	Died 24 May 1980
Clowes, Arthur Victor	Plt Off	BR	1 Sqn	DFC, DFM	Died 7 December 1949
Clyde, William Pancoast "Billy"	Fg Off	BR	601 Sqn		Official Ace
Coates, James Patrick	Lt (FAA)	BR	804 NAS		KIA 6 November 1940
Cobden, Donald Gordon	Plt Off	NZ	74 Sqn		KIA 11 August 1940
Cochrane, Arthur Charles "Cocky"	Plt Off	CAN	257 Sqn	DFC	MIA 31 March 1943
Cock, John Reynolds	Fg Off	AUS	87 Sqn	DFC	Died 29 August 1988
Cockburn, John Clayton	Lt Cdr (FAA)	BR	804 NAS		
Cockburn, Richard Cockburn	Lt (FAA)	BR	808 NAS		
Coggins, John	Plt Off	BR	235 Sqn	MBE, DFM*	MIA 16 December 1940
Coghlan, John Hunter	Fg Off	BR	56 Sqn	DFC	KIA 17 August 1940
Coke, The Hon. David Arthur	Fg Off	BR	257 Sqn		KIA 9 December 1941
Cole, Charles Frederick John	Sgt	BR	236 Sqn		
Colebrook, Christopher	Plt Off	BR	54 Sqn		MIA 21 April 1941
Coleman, Edward Jack	Plt Off	BR	54 Sqn		KIA 7 February 1941
Collard, Peter	Fg Off	BR	615 Sqn	DFC	KIA 14 August 1940
Collett, George Richard	Sgt	BR	54 Sqn		KIA 22 August 1940
Collingridge, Leon William	Plt Off	BR	66 Sqn		Died 20 October 1993
Collins, Anthony Roland	Sqn Ldr	BR	72 Sqn (CO) & 46 Sqn		Died 21 February 1976
Collyns, Basil Gordon	Plt Off	NZ	238 Sqn	DFC	KIA 20 August 1944 (Pilot) Buried in France
Comely, Peter Woodruff	Plt Off	BR	87 Sqn		MIA 15 August 1940
Comerford, Harry Alfred George	Flt Lt	BR	312 Sqn	AFC	
Compton, John William	AC2	BR	25 Sqn		
Connell, William Charles	Plt Off	CAN	32 Sqn		
Connor, Francis Hebblethwaite Powell	Fg Off	BR	234 Sqn		Died 1 May 1982
Connors, Stanley Dudley Pierce	Flt Lt	BR	111 Sqn	DFC*	KIA 18 August 1940
Considene, Brian Bertram	Plt Off	IRE	238 Sqn		
Constable-Maxwell, Michael Hugh	Fg Off	BR	56 Sqn	DSO, DFC	
Constantine, Alexander Noel	Plt Off	AUS	141 Sqn		KIFA 29 July 1947
Cook, Arthur Willson	Sgt	BR	604 Sqn	DFM	
Cook, Harry	Sgt	BR	66 & 266 Sqns		Born Grimsby, 31 August 1920. Commissioned June 1942, demobilised 1946
Cook, Robert Vincent	Sgt	BR	219 Sqn		
Cooke, Charles Alfred	Plt Off	BR	66 Sqn	DFC	Died 28 January 1985
Cooke, Herbert Reginald	Sgt	BR	23 Sqn	DFC	
Coombes, Eric	Sgt	BR	219 Sqn		
Coombs, Robert Johnson	Sgt	BR	600 Sqn	DFC	Died 1951
Cooney, Cecil John	FSgt	BR	56 Sqn		MIA 29 July 1940
Coope, William Edwin	Sqn Ldr	BR	17 Sqn		KIA 4 June 1941
Cooper, Charles Fredrick	AC2	BR	600 Sqn		KIA 3 October 1940
Cooper, Douglas Clifford	Sgt	BR	235 Sqn		
Cooper, James Enerton	Sgt	BR	610 Sqn		KIA 9 September 1941
Cooper, Roy Norman	Sgt	BR	610 & 65 Sqns		Died 28 October 1945
Cooper, Sidney Frederick	Sgt	BR	253 Sqn	AFC	
Cooper, Thomas Arthur	Sgt	BR	266 & 92 Sqns		
Cooper-Key, Aston Maurice	Plt Off	BR	46 Sqn		KIA 24 July 1940
Cooper-Slipper, Thomas Paul Michael	Fg Off	BR	605 Sqn	DFC	Died 23 February 2004
Coote, Leonard Edward Morgan	Sgt	BR	600 Sqn		KIA 23 October 1943
Copcutt, Richard	Sgt	BR	248 Sqn		MIA 20 October 1940; Blenheim P6952 shot down attacking enemy aircraft off Norwegian coast; Flt Lt G M Baird captured, Sgt D L Burton captured wounded, Copcutt missing, W/O S V Wood captured wounded.
Copeland, Norman Downey	Sgt	BR	235 Sqn		
Copeland, Percy	Sgt	BR	616, 66 & 73 Sqns	DFC	KIA 26 June 1942
Copeman, Jack Harry Hamilton	Plt Off	BR	111 Sqn		KIA 11 August 1940 aged 27 when he was shot down in Hurricane P3105 in combat off Margate.
Corbett, George Henry	Plt Off	CAN	66 Sqn		KIA 8 October 1940 aged 21 when as a Pilot of Spitfire R6779 he was shot down in combat by BF 109s and crashed Bayfors Marshes.
Corbett, Vaughan Bowerman	Flt Lt	CAN	401 Sqn	DFC	KIA 20 February 1945, by then a Gp Capt, buried in Toronto, Canada.
Corbin, William James	Sgt	BR	610 & 66 Sqns	DFC	Died 8 December 2012
Corcoran, Henry	Sgt	BR	236 Sqn		MIA 20 July 1940
Cordell, Horace Arthur	Sgt	BR	64 & 616 Sqns		
Corfe, Douglas Fredrick	Sgt	BR	73, 66 & 610 Sqns		KIA 25 April 1942
Cork, Richard John "Dickie"	Sub Lt (FAA)	BR	242 Sqn	DFC	Official Ace, KIA 14 April 1944
Corkett, Allan Henry	Plt Off	BR	253 Sqn		
Corner, Malcolm Charles	Plt Off	CAN	254 Sqn		WIA 23 April 1945
Cory, Noel Henry	Plt Off	BR	25 Sqn		Also spelt "Corry"
Cory, Guy Webster	Fg Off	BR	41 Sqn	AFC	Died 20 June 1981
Cosby, Eric Thomas	Sgt	BR	3 & 615 Sqns		Died 26 April 1978
Cosby, Ivor Henry	Plt Off	BR	610, 72 & 222 Sqns	DFC	
Cotes-Preedy, Digby Vawdre Cartmel	Plt Off	BR	236 Sqn	GM	Died 1972
Cottam, Gerald	AC2	BR	25 Sqn		
Cottam, Hubert Weatherby	Plt Off	BR	213 Sqn		Killed active service 5 December 1941
Courtis, Jack Burall	Sgt	NZ	111 Sqn		KIA 5 December 1940
Courtney, Ronald Noel Hamilton	Fg Off	BR	151 Sqn	DFC, AFC	
Coussens, Herbert William	Sgt	BR	601 Sqn		
Couzens, George Walter	Plt Off	BR	54 Sqn		Died June 1978
Coverley, William Hugh	Fg Off	BR	602 Sqn		KIA 7 September 1940
Covington, Aubrey Richard	Plt Off	BR	238 Sqn		
Coward, James Baird	Flt Lt	BR	19 Sqn	AFC	Retired from the RAF at the rank of Air Cdre. Born 1915. Died 25 July 2012.
Cowen, William	AC2	BR	25 Sqn		Died 20 June 1979
Cowley, James	Sgt	BR	87 Sqn		
Cowley, Thomas Donald	Flt Lt	BR	605 Sqn	DFC	Died 2012
Cowsill, James Roy	Sgt	BR	56 Sqn		MIA 13 July 1940
Cox, David George Samuel Richardson	Sgt	BR	19 Sqn	DFC*, CdeG	
Craig, George Dudley	Flt Lt	BR	607 Sqn	OBE	Died 1974
Craig, John Teasdale "Bobby"	Sgt	BR	111 Sqn		Official Ace, KIA 2 June 1941
Cranwell, Edward William "Ted"	Sgt	BR	610 & 102 Sqns	DFC	Commissioned from Warrant Officer to Flt in February 1943 – Died 1993
Crew, Edward Dixon	Fg Off	BR	604 Sqn	DFC*, DSO*, CB	Official Ace, Retired with the rank of AVM. 1917–2002
Crockett, Ronald Frederick	Plt Off	BR	236 Sqn		KIA 17 September 1942
Crook, David Moore	Plt Off	BR	609 Sqn	DFC	Official Ace, MIA 18 December 1944
Croskell, Michael Ernest	Sgt	BR	213 Sqn		Surviving aircrew
Crossley, Michael Nicholson	Flt Lt	BR	32 Sqn (CO)	DSO, OBE, DFC	Official Ace
Crowley-Milling, Denis W "Crow"	Plt Off	BR	242 Sqn	KCB, CBE, DSO, DFC*, AE	Official Ace, Retired in 1975 as AM Sir Denis Crowley-Milling. Appointed Controller of the RAF Benevolent Fund and became president of the Not Forgotten Association. Died 1 December 1996.
Cuddie, William Arthur	Plt Off	CAN	141 Sqn		MIA 3 October 1943
Cukr, Václav	Sgt	CZ	43 & 253 Sqns		Died 14 October 1989
Cullen, Reginald Walker	AC2	BR	23 Sqn		
Culmer, James Douglas	Sgt	BR	25 Sqn		
Culverwell, John Henry	Sgt	BR	87 Sqn		KIA 25 July 1940
Cumbers, Alfred Bernard	Sgt	BR	141 Sqn		
Cunningham, James	Sgt	BR	29 Sqn		
Cunningham, John "Cat's Eyes"	Flt Lt	BR	604 Sqn	OBE, CBE, DSO**, DFC*, AE	Official Ace, Left the RAF with the rank of Gp Capt to become chief test pilot for de Havilland. Died 21 July 2002.
Cunningham, John Laurence Gilchrist	Flt Lt	BR	603 Sqn		MIA 28 August 1940
Cunningham, W	Flt Lt	BR	43 Sqn		
Cunningham, Wallace	Flt Lt	BR	19 Sqn		Official Ace. Died 4 October 2011.
Cunnington, William George	Sgt	BR	607 Sqn		MIA 16 November 1940
Cupitt, Thomas	Sgt	BR	29 Sqn		
Curchin, John	Plt Off	AUS	609 Sqn	DFC	Official Ace, KIA 4 June 1941
Curley, Albert George	Sgt	BR	141 Sqn		MIA 19 July 1940
Currant, Christopher Frederick "Bunny"	Flt Lt	BR	605 Sqn	DFC*, DSO, CDeG	Official Ace, Died 12 March 2006
Curtis, Frank William	Sgt	BR	25 Sqn		
Cutts, John Wintringham	Fg Off	BR	222 Sqn		MIA 4 September 1940
Czajkowski, Franciszek	Plt Off	POL	151 Sqn	KW*	Died 25 October 1942 (Hospital bombed)
Czerniak, Jerzy	Plt Off	POL	302 Sqn	KW**	KIA 9 August 1941
Czernin, Count Manfred Beckett	Fg Off	BR	17 Sqn	DSO, MC, DFC	Official Ace Born Berlin, Germany, 18 January 1913. Changed name from Count Manfred Marie Ralph Edmund Czernin to Manfred Beckett (Mother's maiden name), Nov 1931; changed name from Manfred Beckett to Count Manfred Beckett Czernin (part of original name), Nov 1936; involved in secret missions in Italian-speaking territory for Special Operations Executive, 1943–1945; retired Jan 1958, died in London, 6 October 1962
Czerny, Jan	Flt Lt	POL	302 Sqn	KW	Died 18 February 1991 in Poland.
Czerwinski, Tadeusz	Fg Off	POL	302 Sqn	KW**	KIA 22 August 1942
Czternastek, Stanislaw	Plt Off	POL	32 Sqn		KIA 5 February 1941

== Notes on table ==
- Ranks given are those held during the Battle of Britain, although a higher rank may have been achieved after the Battle.
- All individuals listed in bold and highlighted in silver are believed to be still alive.
- Aircrew listed as KIA, MIA, WIA or KIFA during the Battle of Britain are highlighted in blue.
- The awards listed include those made during the Battle of Britain and during the remainder of World War II, as well as any made post-war.
- In order to limit the numbers of footnotes which would otherwise be required, the symbol ‡ under "Notes" indicates several entries in the text of Ramsay 1989, while the symbol † indicates that information on the circumstances under which an airman became a casualty during the Battle is included in the text of the book. Where more than one crew member of a multi place aircraft was involved this is included as a cross-reference under "Notes"
- In addition to 2,353 British aircrew, the RAF Roll of Honour recognises 574 personnel from other countries; namely:

Australia, Barbados, Belgium, Canada, Czechoslovakia, France, Ireland, Jamaica, Newfoundland, New Zealand, Poland, Rhodesia, South Africa and the United States.

=== Abbreviations ===
- (CO) after "Sqn" denotes Commanding Officer of that squadron, as per the RAF Fighter Command Order of Battle on 15 September 1940, unless otherwise indicated.
- (FAA) after a rank denotes a member of the Fleet Air Arm rather than the RAF.
- "KIA" – "killed in action"
- "KIFA" – "killed in flying accident", i.e. not during combat
- "MIA" – "missing in action".
- "WIA" – "wounded in action" leading to death which, in some cases, may have occurred months later.
- "POW" – "prisoner of war".
- For details of RAF rank abbreviations, see RAF Commissioned Officer Ranks and RAF Non-Commissioned Officer Ranks.
- For details of FAA rank abbreviations, see FAA Commissioned Officer Ranks.

=== Nationalities ===
AME	American
AUS	Australian
BEL	Belgian
BR	British
CAN	Canadian
CZ	Czechoslovak
FR	French
IRE	Irish
NZ	New Zealander
POL	Polish
RHO	Rhodesian
SA	South African

=== Awards ===
Award	Title	Notes
AE	Air Efficiency Award	Awarded for ten years' efficient service in the Royal Auxiliary Air Force
AFC	Air Force Cross	At this time, awarded "for acts of courage or devotion to duty whilst flying, though not in active operations against the enemy" to commissioned officers and warrant officers. Extended to all ranks in 1993.
CB	Companion of The Order of the Bath	Awarded at the monarch's pleasure
CDeG	Croix de Guerre	A military decoration of both France and Belgium, also commonly bestowed to foreign military forces allied to France and Belgium.
CdeL	Croix de la Libération	A decoration of France awarded for very meritorious conduct with the Free French Forces during World War II.
CdeLd'H	Croix de Légion d'honneur	A decoration of France awarded for excellent civil or military conduct delivered, upon official investigation.
CdeLL	Croix de L'Ordre de Leopold	Awarded to Belgian nationals or some distinguished foreign persons who made very important contributions to the Belgian state or society.
DFC	Distinguished Flying Cross	At this time, awarded "for acts of gallantry when flying in active operations against the enemy" to commissioned officers and warrant officers. Extended to all ranks in 1993.
DFC*	Distinguished Flying Cross and Bar	A bar is added to the ribbon for holders of the DFC who receive a second award.
DFC**	Distinguished Flying Cross and Two Bars	A second bar is added to the ribbon for holders of the DFC and Bar who receive a third award.
DFM	Distinguished Flying Medal	At this time, awarded "for acts of gallantry when flying in active operations against the enemy" to non-commissioned officers and men. Discontinued in 1993.
DSO	Distinguished Service Order	Awarded for meritorious or distinguished service by officers of the armed forces during wartime, typically in actual combat.
DSO*	Distinguished Service Order and Bar	A bar is added to the ribbon for holders of the DSO who received a second award.
DSO**	Distinguished Service Order and Two Bars	A second bar is added to the ribbon for holders of the DSO and Bar who received a third award.
GCB	Knight Grand Cross of The Order of the Bath	Awarded at the monarch's pleasure
KCVO	Knight Commander of the Royal Victorian Order	Awarded for personal service to the sovereign
KStJ	Knight of the Order of Saint John	
KW	Krzyz Walecznych, Polish "Cross of Valour"	Awarded to an individual who "has demonstrated deeds of valour and courage on the field of battle."
KZ	Krzyz Zaslugi, Polish "Cross of Merit"	Awarded for exemplary public service or humanitarian work that goes above and beyond the call of duty.
MBE	Member of the Order of the British Empire	Awarded at the monarch's pleasure
MC	Military Cross	At this time, awarded for "distinguished and meritorious services" to officers of the rank of Captain or below, and warrant officers. Extended to all ranks in 1993.
MM	Military Medal	Awarded for acts of gallantry and devotion to duty under fire
OBE	Officer of the Order of the British Empire	Awarded at the monarch's pleasure
OStJ	Officer of the Order of Saint John	
VC	Victoria Cross	Highest British military decoration, awarded for valour in the face of the enemy.
VM	Virtuti Militari	Highest Polish military award for courage in the face of the enemy.

== See also ==
- Non-British personnel in the RAF during the Battle of Britain
- List of World War II aces from the United Kingdom
- List of World War II aces by country
- List of World War II air aces
- List of RAF aircrew in the Battle of Britain (D–F)
- List of RAF aircrew in the Battle of Britain (G–K)
- List of RAF aircrew in the Battle of Britain (L-N)
- List of RAF aircrew in the Battle of Britain (O-R)
- List of RAF aircrew in the Battle of Britain (S-U)
- List of RAF aircrew in the Battle of Britain (V-Z)

== Bibliography ==
- Ramsay, Winston, ed. The Battle of Britain Then and Now Mk V. London: Battle of Britain Prints International Ltd, 1989. ISBN 0-900913-46-0.
- Ringlstetter, Herbert (2005). Helmut Wick, An Illustrated Biography of the Luftwaffe Ace And Commander of Jagdgeschwader 2 During The Battle of Britain. Atglen, PA: Schiffer Publishing. ISBN 0-7643-2217-6.
- Remembering the Battle of Britain
- Robert Dixon, '607 Squadron: A Shade of Blue'. The History Press 2008. ISBN 978-0-7524-4531-1
- Robert Dixon, 'A Gathering of Eagles' PublishBritannica 2004, ISBN 1-4137-3498-7
- Robert Dixon, 'Men of the North: A few of the Few' Wolf's Nick Publishing 2011, ISBN 978-1-4664-4683-0
