= No. 234 Squadron RAF =

No. 234 (Madras Presidency) Squadron RAF
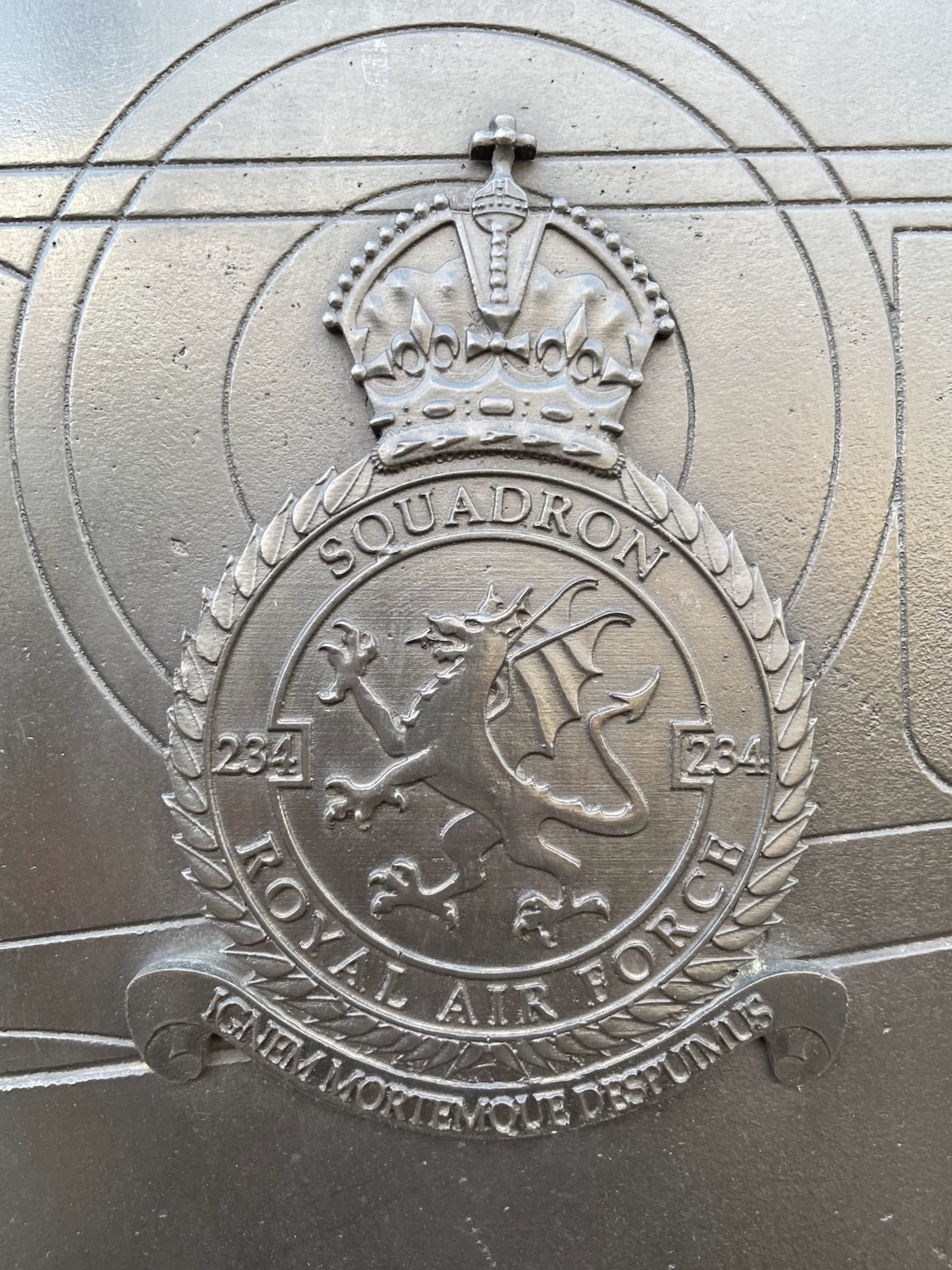
- The squadron's heraldic badge as displayed on the Battle of Britain Monument in London.
- Active: 20 Aug 1918 - 15 May 1919; 30 Oct 1939 - 1 Sep 1946; 1 Aug 1952 - 15 Jul 1957; 22 Oct 1958 - 31 Aug 1992; 1 Sep 1992 – 1 Apr 1994
- Country: United Kingdom
- Branch: Royal Air Force
- Nickname: Madras Presidency "The Dragons"
- Mottos: Latin: Ignem mortemque despuimus ("We spit fire and death")
- Engagements: Battle of Britain

Insignia
- Squadron Badge heraldry: A dragon rampant, flames issuing from the mouth The dragon indicates the fighting role and the flames associate with the name Spitfire
- Squadron Codes: AZ (May 1940 - Aug 1945); FX (Aug 1945 - Sep 1946); W (Aug 1952 - Jan 1954)

No. 234 Squadron RAF had a long career within the RAF, being operational on flying boats in World War I and on fighter aircraft in World War II. After the war it remained a fighter unit till 1957. In its last incarnation the squadron was in turn Operational Training Unit (OTU), Tactical Weapon Unit (TWU) and part of No. 4 Flying Training School RAF until finally disbanded in 1994.

== History ==
=== Formation and World War I ===
No. 234 Squadron RAF was officially formed on 20 August 1918 at RNAS Tresco in the Scilly Isles from No. 350, 351, 352 and 353 Flights, which had been equipped with amongst others Felixstowe F3's and Curtiss H.12 aircraft since February 1917. The squadron used these to patrol the Western Approaches of the English Channel and gained two DSCs, one DSM and a CGM in doing that. The unit flew its last World War I mission on 10 November 1918 and was disbanded half a year later at Tresco on 15 May 1919.

=== In World War II ===
The squadron was reformed on 30 October 1939 at RAF Leconfield, initially equipped with three Magisters, a Battle and three biplane Gauntlets, soon to be followed by some Blenheims Mk.Ifs, which were used flying on coastal patrols until March 1940. It then began to re-equip with Spitfires and moved to RAF Church Fenton in May 1940 when becoming operational.

In June 1940 the squadron moved to RAF St Eval in Cornwall where it was based before and after the date regarded historically as the start of the Battle of Britain, 10 July. Here the unit's main duties were patrols, scrambles and convoy protection. On 15 August 234 Squadron was posted to RAF Middle Wallop, a part of No. 10 Group RAF flying in defence of Portsmouth, Southampton and other targets along the south coast. As there were fewer raids along the south coast than in the south east, about two thirds of patrols, scrambles and interceptions undertaken were flown in support of No. 11 Group RAF, as far as Kent. The squadron achieved a number of victories, including those of its inspirational force, high scoring Australian Pat Hughes and those of two long-surviving members of The Few, Bob Doe and Keith Lawrence. On the afternoon of 7 September the Luftwaffe made its first heavy daylight raid on London. 234 Squadron was amongst those scrambled to intercept the enemy bomber force as it retired; during the engagement, the squadron lost both Pat Hughes and its CO, Squadron Leader O'Brien. Two days later, the squadron was posted back to its old base at St Eval to be rested, receive replacement aircraft and train new pilots being posted in from OTUs – Operational Training Units; the squadron had lost 18 Spitfires in 4 weeks fighting.

During 1941 and 1942 the squadron was operating from various bases in the south and carried out both offensive and defensive duties but in January 1943 it was transferred to Orkney, flying at first from RAF Grimsetter with a detachment at RAF Sumburgh, and later from RAF Skeabrae."

Six months later the squadron returned to the South of England, firstly at RAF Church Stanton, and was soon operating over France again in preparation for Operation Overlord, the forthcoming Allied invasion of Normandy. On D-Day it was equipped with the Spitfire V LF operating from RAF Deanland as part of Air Defence of Great Britain, though under the operational control of RAF Second Tactical Air Force.

After D-Day the squadron converted to North American Mustang Mk.IIIs, which it used to provide long-range bomber escort missions from RAF North Weald and after December 1944 from RAF Bentwaters. On 1 May 1945 the squadron was moved to RAF Peterhead to provide a similar service to the RAF Coastal Command strike wings operating along the Norwegian coast, having received some additional new North American Mustang Mk.IVs (the RAF version of the P-51D Mustang) by this time.")

=== Post-war era: from Spitfires to jets ===
With the end of the war, the squadron reverted to Spitfire Mk.IXs and was retained as part of the post-war RAF. Jets arrived in February 1946, when Meteor F.3s replaced the Spitfires, but on 1 September the squadron was disbanded by being renumbered to No. 266 Squadron RAF. The squadron reformed at Oldenburg on 1 August 1952 in the ground attack role, equipped with Vampires FB.5 and FB.9s. In November 1953 it returned to the day fighter role when it began to receive North American Sabre F.4s, conversion being completed by January 1954. The squadron moved to RAF Geilenkirchen on 8 January 1954, where Hunter F.4s replaced the Sabres in May 1956, but following the 1957 Defence White Paper of Minister of Defence Duncan Sandys, the Squadron was disbanded on 15 July 1957.

=== With No. 229 OCU and No. 1 TWU ===
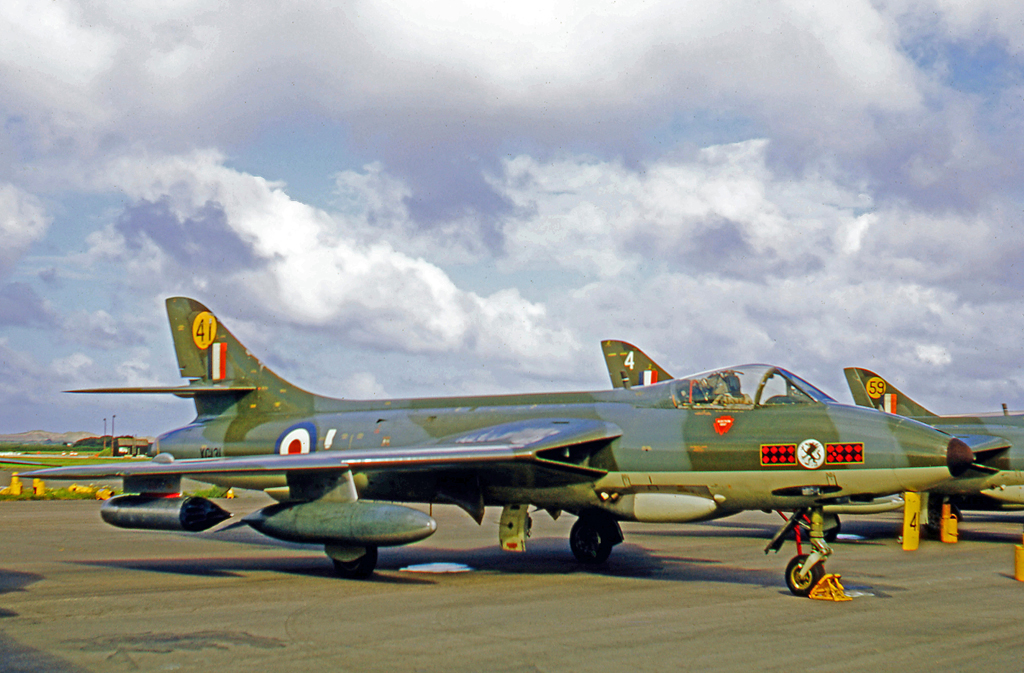
Hawker Hunter F.6 wearing the red nose markings of No. 234 Squadron at its base at RAF Chivenor in 1969.

The squadron number popped up again when one of the squadrons of No. 229 Operational Conversion Unit (OCU) at RAF Chivenor was given the number on 22 October 1958, operating Hunter F.6 and FGA.9 aircraft, to give Hunter pilots their operational training. On 2 September 1974 No. 229 OCU moved to RAF Brawdy (formerly HMS Goldcrest) with the closure of Chivenor for refurbishment and was redesignated as the Tactical Weapons Unit (TWU), with No. 234 (Reserve) Squadron remaining one of its components. The squadron converted from Hunters to the Hawk T.1 in 1978.

When a second TWU was later formed at Chivenor, the original was renamed No. 1 TWU, again with No. 234 Squadron as one of its constituent squadrons. When No. 1 TWU was disbanded on 31 August 1992, so were its component squadrons, No 79(F) and No 234.

=== With No. 4 FTS ===
The following day however, 1 September 1992, the number was allocated to a squadron of No. 4 (Advanced) Flying Training School (AFTS) at RAF Valley, which had taken over the duties of the TWUs. The squadron continued as part of the school until 1 April 1994, when it was disbanded by being renumbered to No. 208 (Reserve) Squadron.
