= No. 253 Squadron RAF =

Defunct flying squadron of the Royal Air Force

No. 253 (Hyderabad State) Squadron RAF
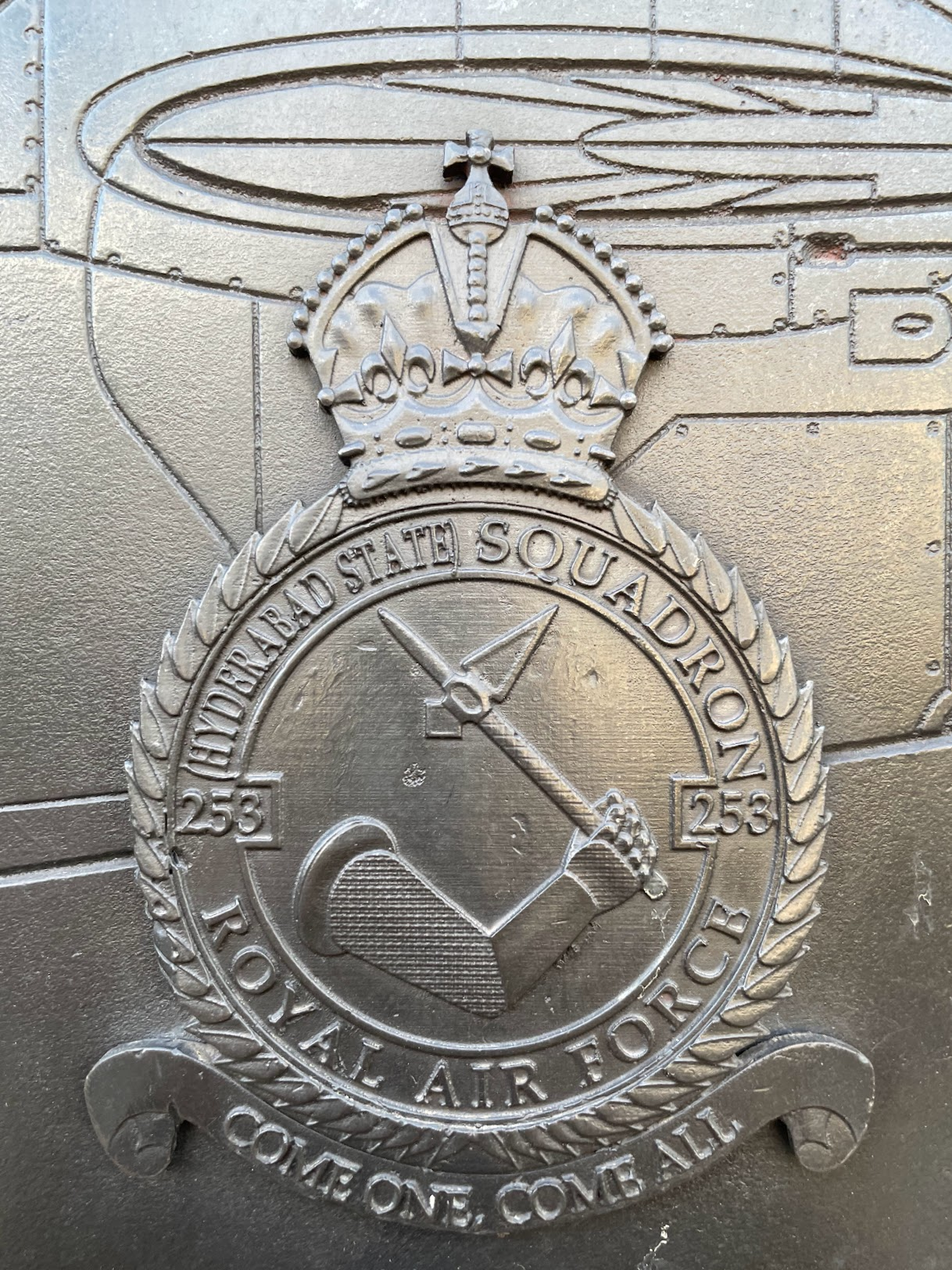
- The heraldic badge of the squadron as it appears on the Battle of Britain Monument in London.
- Active: 7 Jun 1918 – 31 May 1919; 30 Oct 1939 – 16 May 1947; 18 Apr 1955 – 2 Sep 1957
- Country: United Kingdom
- Branch: Royal Air Force
- Nickname(s): Hyderabad State
- Patron: The Nizam of Hyderabad
- Motto(s): Come one, Come all

Insignia
- Squadron badge heraldry: The back of a dexter arm embowed, fessewise, in Mogul armour, the hand holding an Indian battle-axe.
- Squadron code: TL (April to September 1939)
- 1950s squadron roundel

No. 253 (Hyderabad State) Squadron was a flying squadron of the Royal Air Force between 1918 and 1947. Originally formed in 1918, it served in WW1 flying coastal reconnaissance and anti-submarine patrols. Later in WW2 it took part in the Battle of France, the Battle of Britain, and then fought in the Mediterranean Theatre of Operations in Algeria. The squadron was disbanded on 16 May 1947, and briefly revived as a night-fighter squadron from 18 April 1955 to 2 September 1957.

== History ==
=== WW1 ===
253 Squadron was originally formed at Bembridge, on the Isle of Wight, on 7 June 1918, remaining there until disbanded on 31 May 1919.

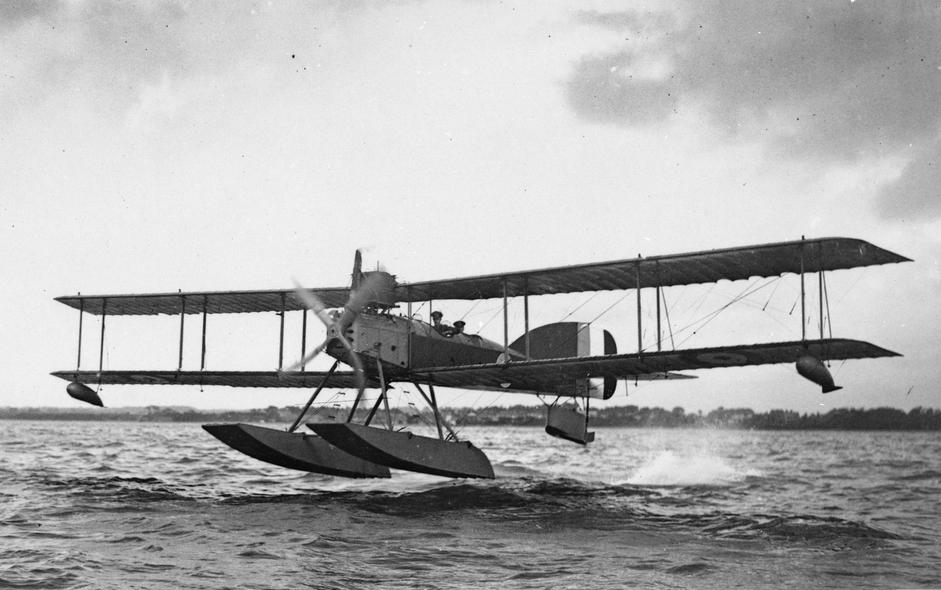
A Short Type 184 taking off

During the squadrons stay at Bembridge it parented No. 412 (Seaplane) Flight RAF and No. 413 (Seaplane) Flight RAF, as well as No. 511 (Special Duty) Flight RAF, No. 512 (Special Duty) Flight RAF and No. 513 (Special Duty) Flight RAF for coastal reconnaissance and anti-submarine patrols, flying Short Type 184 and Airco DH.6 aircraft. DH.6s of 511 and 512 Flights flew their aircraft from the aerodrome at Foreland.

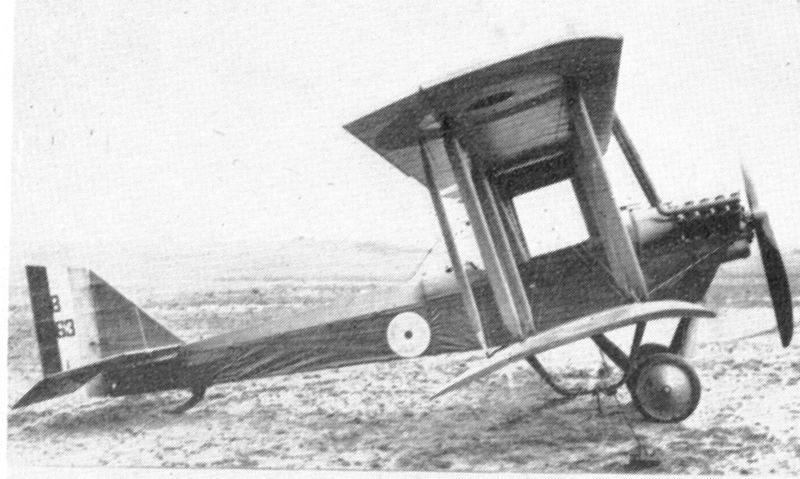
An Airco DH.6 similar to one flown by 253 Squadron

=== WW2 ===
Reformed at RAF Manston on 30 October 1939, to become a convoy protection unit equipped with Blenheims, 253 changed role to day-fighter before any Blenheims had been received and was issued with Hawker Hurricanes instead. One flight was despatched to France, whilst the second flight flew across the English Channel daily, operating from French airfields and returning to Manston.

After the collapse of France, 253 Sqn disbanded and re-formed at RAF Kirton-in-Lindsey, taking part in the Battle of Britain from a variety of airfields across the country. Remaining in England until 1942, 253 Sqn. was re-located to the Mediterranean Theatre of Operations (MTO) from 13 November 1942 at RAF Maison Blanche in Algeria, continuing operations in the Mediterranean.

=== Post-war era ===
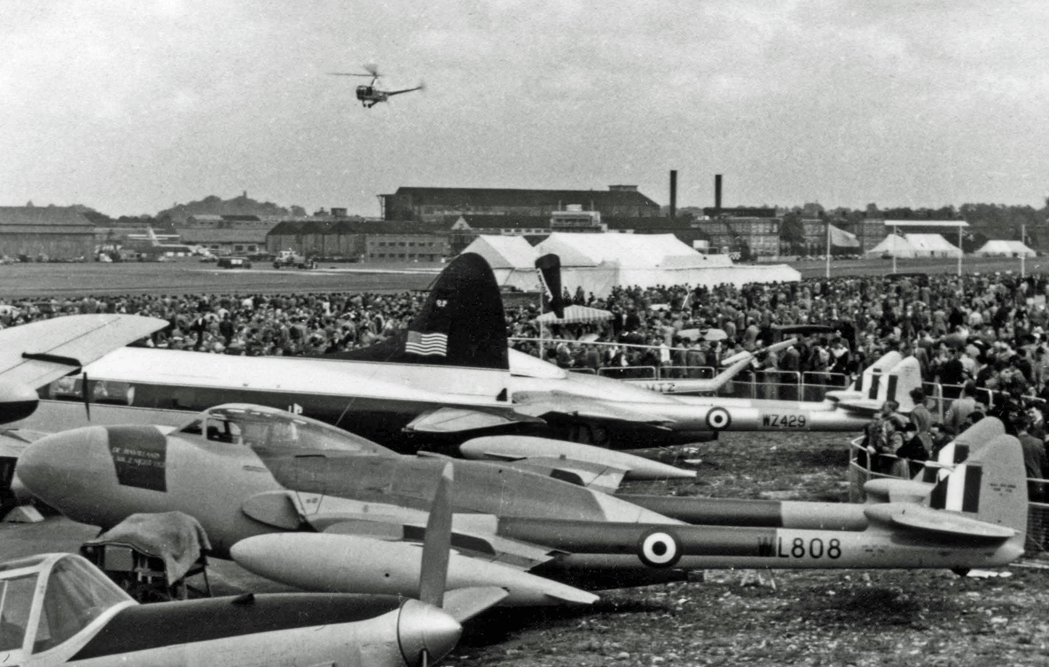
A Venom NF.2 at the 1952 Farnborough Airshow

After the war, 253 squadron was disbanded at RAF Treviso, Italy on 16 May 1947. However, it enjoyed a brief existence as a night-fighter unit flying the de Havilland Venom NF.2 from RAF Waterbeach from 18 April 1955 to 2 September 1957.

== Aircraft operated ==
- Short Type 184
- Airco DH.6
- Sopwith Baby
- Miles Magister
- Miles Master
- Fairey Battle
- Hawker Hurricane
- Supermarine Spitfire
- de Havilland Venom
- de Havilland Vampire

== Heraldry ==
A squadron badge was created after the squadron became the Hyderabad gift squadron in the heraldic form of:The back of a dexter arm embowed, fessewise, in Mogul armour, the hand holding an Indian battle-axe.

The badge was suggested by the Nizam of Hyderabad as appropriate.

== See also ==
- List of Royal Air Force aircraft squadrons
- List of Battle of Britain squadrons
- List of Royal Air Force aircraft independent flights
- List of RAF squadron codes
