= No. 141 Squadron RAF =

Defunct flying squadron of the Royal Air Force

- Active: 1 January 1918 - 1 February 1920; 4 October 1939 - 7 September 1945; 17 June 1946 - 1 February 1958; 1 April 1959 - 31 March 1964.
- Country: United Kingdom
- Branch: Royal Air Force
- Mottos: Latin: Caedimus Noctu ("We slay by night")

Insignia
- Squadron codes: UD Allocated Apr - Sep 1939; TW Apr 1940 - Sep 1945, Jun 1946 - Apr 1951
- Post-1950 squadron roundel

No. 141 Squadron was a squadron of the British Royal Air Force. It was first formed as part of the Royal Flying Corps in January 1918 as a fighter squadron, serving on home defence duties for the rest of the First World War., before being disbanded in 1920. The Second World War resulted in the squadron being reformed in 1939, serving as a night fighter and night intruder squadron until being disbanded in September 1945. it was reformed again in 1946, flying night fighters until 1958, while from 1959 until 1964 operated surface-to-air missiles.

== First World War ==
No. 141 Squadron of the Royal Flying Corps was formed on 1 January 1918 from 61 Squadron at Rochford, as part of a strengthening of the fighter defences for the London Area, with the squadron joining 49 Wing. The squadron was initially equipped with a variety of types, evaluating both the Sopwith Dolphin and Vickers Vampire as night fighters, with both proving unsuitable for the task, with squadron flying operational sorties with its Royal Aircraft Factory B.E.12s. In February 1918, the squadron moved to Biggin Hill, re-equipping with two-seat Bristol F.2 Fighters during March that year. The squadron became part of the newly established Royal Air Force on 1 April 1918. In April, the squadron took part in trials in the use of ground-to-air voice radio transmissions to help co-ordinate fighter operations. On the night of 19/20 May 1918, Germany launched the last major night bomber raid against London, involving 43 aircraft. One of 141 Squadron's Bristol fighters, flown by pilot Lieutenant Edward Turner and gunner Air Mechanic Henry Barwise, shot down a Gotha G.V bomber that had previously been damaged by a Bristol Fighter of 143 Squadron, with both Turner and Barwise being awarded the Distinguished Flying Cross for that night's operations. In total, at least six Gothas were lost that night.

In March 1919 the squadron moved to Tallaght Aerodrome, near Dublin Ireland, flying patrols during the Irish War of Independence. It moved to Baldonnel in December 1919 and was disbanded on 1 February 1920.

== Second World War ==
141 Sqn was reformed on 4 October 1939 at RAF Turnhouse, receiving Gloster Gladiators and then Bristol Blenheims for training purposes. It moved to RAF Grangemouth later in October and to RAF Prestwick in February 1940. In April 1940, the squadron reequipped with Boulton Paul Defiants, moving to RAF West Malling, Kent on 10 July. On 19 July 1940, the squadron was ordered to scramble to intercept aircraft attacking a ship in the English Channel, but the nine Defiants were too late to catch the German aircraft, and were instead attacked by Messerschmitt Bf 109s of Jagdgeschwader 51. Six Defiants were shot down, with 10 aircrew killed. The losses convinced RAF Fighter Command that the Defiant was unsuitable for operations over the South of England, and 141 Squadron was ordered back to Scotland on 21 July.

Once back in Scotland, the squadron carried out convoy escort and night fighter patrols from RAF Montrose and RAF Dyce. The squadron was re-designated a night fighter unit, a role more suited to the Defiant. The Squadron motto derives from this period.

Later, 141 Squadron converted to Bristol Beaufighters.

From 1943, it changed roles again to long range intruder operations with Beaufighters over occupied Europe, using the Serrate radar detector, while based at RAF West Raynham in Norfolk.

Venom NF Mk 3s arrived in June 1955 but these were replaced by Gloster Javelins in February 1957 (rafweb.org).

On 16 January 1958, No. 141 Squadron, based at RAF Coltishall, near Norwich in Norfolk, dropped the '1' at the beginning of its number and was thus reborn as 41 Squadron. In doing so, the reborn 41 Squadron automatically absorbed 141's all-weather Gloster Javelin FAW.4 fighters and personnel.

Its final incarnation was as a Bloodhound surface to air missile unit at RAF Dunholme Lodge from 1 April 1959 until 31 March 1964.

== Stations ==
- RAF Turnhouse
- RAF West Malling
- RAF Prestwick
- RAF Dyce
- RAF Montrose
- RAF Biggin Hill
- RAF Gatwick
- RAF Drem
- RAF West Raynham
- RAF Coltishall - 141 Night Fighter Squadron RAF Commanded by Sqn Ldr J O Dalley DFM RAF

(Source: MoD Records.)

== See also ==
- List of Royal Air Force aircraft squadrons
