= Battle of Britain Monument, London =

Memorial in London

Coordinates: 51.503017°N 0.123425°W

Battle of Britain Monument
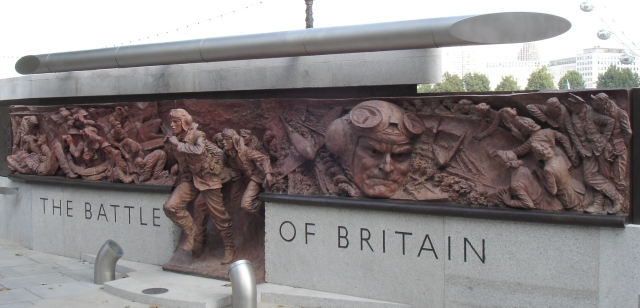
- A section of the Battle of Britain Monument
- Interactive map of Battle of Britain Monument
- Location: Victoria Embankment, London, United Kingdom
- Designer: Paul Day
- Type: Sculpture
- Material: Bronze, granite
- Width: 25 m (82 ft 0 in)
- Opening date: 18 September 2005; 21 years ago
- Dedicated to: Aircrew who flew in the Battle of Britain during the Second World War

The Battle of Britain Monument in London is a sculpture on the Victoria Embankment, overlooking the River Thames, which commemorates the individuals who took part in the Battle of Britain during the Second World War.

It was unveiled on 18 September 2005, the 65th anniversary of the Battle, by Prince Charles and Camilla, Duchess of Cornwall, in the presence of many of the surviving airmen known collectively as "The Few", following the Royal Air Force Service of Thanksgiving and Rededication on Battle of Britain Sunday. This service is an annual event, the first of which took place in 1943 at St Paul's Cathedral and since has taken place in Westminster Abbey.

The monument was conceived by Bill Bond, founder of the Battle of Britain Historical Society, who was later appointed an MBE for his services to heritage. He was solely responsible for negotiating with the City of Westminster to secure the site of the monument, as well as appointing Donald Insall Associates as architects. He also formed the fundraising committee after raising over £250,000 through an appeal. The budget was £1.74 million which was funded in the main by private donations. Bill Bond appointed Lord Tebbit as chairman of the fundraising committee.

The monument utilises a panelled granite structure 25 m (82 ft) long which was originally designed as a smoke outlet for underground trains when they were powered by steam engines. A walkway was cut obliquely through the middle of the structure, and is lined with panels of high relief sculpture in bronze depicting scenes from the Battle of Britain. The centrepiece is an approximately life sized sculpture of airmen scrambling for their aircraft during the battle. The outside of the monument is lined with bronze plaques listing 2,937 pilots and aircrew from 14 countries who took part in the battle on the Allied side. In July 2020, Ajax historian Martin Sugarman, lost a campaign to list one of the airmen, whose parents were born in Mandatory Palestine, as being “British-Israeli" or "British Palestinian”. A member of the London monument team advised that, with nearly 3,000 names on the memorial, there was “no prospect of post-unveiling correction”.

In October 2026, during a national pro-Palestinian march in central London, individuals wearing keffiyehs and carrying Palestinian flags climbed the Battle of Britain Monument and trampled commemorative poppy wreaths placed at its base, prompting a Metropolitan Police investigation and several arrests on suspicion of criminal damage. The incident occurred against a broader backdrop of pro-Palestinian activism in Britain, including disruptive actions linked to the proscribed group Palestine Action.

The sculptor of the monument is Paul Day. The statue was cast by Morris Singer, which is the oldest established fine art foundry in the world and has cast many prominent statues and sculptures in London and around the world, including the lions and fountains in Trafalgar Square.

The architectural historian Gavin Stamp wrote of the sculpture:

Long, bronze relief friezes by Paul Day [...] are in a sort of 3-D super-realist style depicting pilots scrambling for action and giving Jerry a good hiding. The importance of that conflict for Britain and Europe and the heroism of those pilots certainly cannot be exaggerated, but do the events of 1940 really have to be recalled quite so literally? I am afraid these sculptures remind me of the cartoon strips illustrating the improbable adventures of 'Paddy Payne, Fighter Pilot' that I read in the Lion comic as a schoolboy. The objection to this work is not that it is figurative but that it is so childish and lacking in subtlety.

== See also ==
- Air Forces Memorial
