= List of RAF aircrew in the Battle of Britain (S–U) =

The following is a list of pilots and other aircrew who flew during the Battle of Britain, and were awarded the Battle of Britain Clasp to the 1939–45 Star by flying at least one authorised operational sortie with an eligible unit of the Royal Air Force or Fleet Air Arm during the period from 0001 hours on 10 July to 2359 hours 31 October 1940.

== History ==
In 1942, the Air Ministry made the decision to compile a list from records of the names of pilots who had lost their lives as a result of the fighting during the Battle of Britain (Note: This was initially regarded as being from 8 August to 31 October 1940; however, the dates were later amended to also include those who lost their lives between 10 July and 7 August.) for the purpose of building a national memorial. This became the Battle of Britain Chapel at Westminster Abbey, which was unveiled by King George VI on 10 July 1947. The Roll of Honour within the Chapel contains the names of 1,497 pilots and aircrew killed or mortally wounded during the Battle.

Nothing was done officially, however, to define the qualifications for the classification of a Battle of Britain airman until 9 November 1960. AMO N850, published by the Air Ministry, stated for the first time the requirements for the awarding of the Battle of Britain Star, and listed the 71 units which were deemed to have been under the control of RAF Fighter Command.

In 1955 Flt Lt John Holloway, a serving RAF officer, began a personal challenge to compile a complete list of "The Few". After fourteen years of research Flt Lt Holloway had 2,946 names on the list. Of these airmen, 537 were killed during the Battle or later died of wounds received.

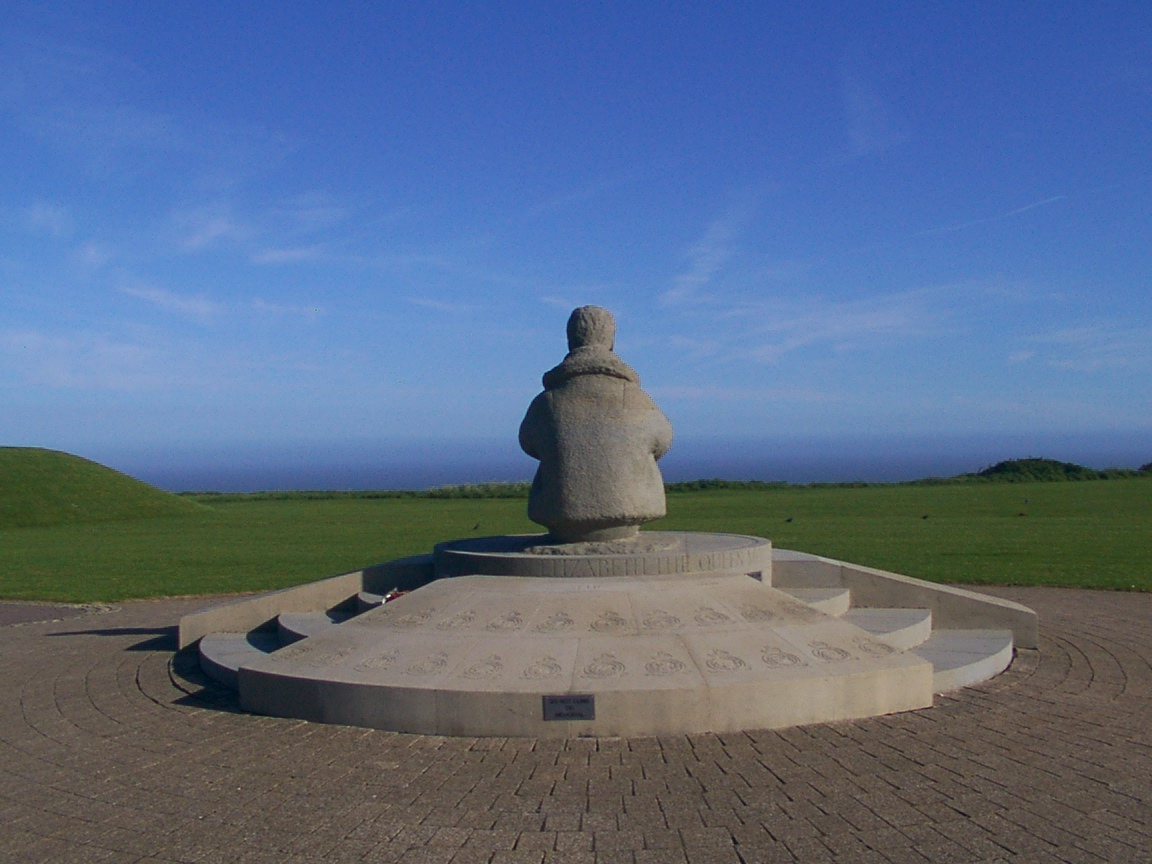
Battle of Britain Memorial at Capel-le-Ferne

The Battle of Britain Memorial Trust, founded by Geoffrey Page, raised funds for the construction of the Battle of Britain Memorial at Capel-le-Ferne near Folkestone in Kent. The Memorial, unveiled by Queen Elizabeth The Queen Mother on 9 July 1993, shares the site with the Christopher Foxley-Norris Memorial Wall on which a complete list of "The Few" is engraved.

More recently, the Battle of Britain Monument on the Victoria Embankment in London was unveiled on 18 September 2005 by Charles, Prince of Wales and his wife Camilla, Duchess of Cornwall. The idea for the monument was conceived by the Battle of Britain Historical Society which then set about raising funds for its construction. The outside of the monument is lined with bronze plaques listing all the Allied airmen who took part in the Battle.

== S ==
| Name | Rank | Nationality | Sqn during Battle | Awards | Notes |
|---|---|---|---|---|---|
| Sadler, Herbert Samuel | Flt Sgt | BR | 611 Sqn | | KIA 5 February 1941 |
| Sadler, Norman Alfred | Plt Off | BR | 235 Sqn | | MIA 16 December 1940 |
| St Aubyn, Edward Fitzroy | Flt Lt | BR | 616 Sqn | | KIA 27 May 1943 (Surname also spelt St Aubin) |
| St James-Smith, Ronald Godfrey | Sgt | BR | 600 Sqn | | KIA 13 April 1941 |
| St John, Peter Cape Beauchamp | Fg Off | BR | 74 Sqn | | KIA 22 October 1940 |
| Salmon, Harold Nigel Egerton | Fg Off | BR | 1 & 229 Sqns | | MIA 6 December 1943 |
| Salmond, William Noel Compton | Plt Off | BR | 64 Sqn | | Died 26 September 1985 |
| Salway, Ernest | Sgt | BR | 141 Sqn | | KIA 20 June 1942 (Air Gunner) |
| Samolinski, Wlodzimierz Michal C "Sammy" | Plt Off | POL | 253 Sqn | VM, KW | MIA 26 September 1940 |
| Sample, John | Sqn Ldr | BR | 504 Sqn (CO) | DFC | KOAS 28 October 1941 |
| Sampson, Arthur | Sgt | BR | 23 Sqn | | |
| Sanders, Donald Joseph | Flt Lt | BR | 54 Sqn | | KIA 7 September 1940 |
| Sanders, James Gilbert | Flt Lt | BR | 615 Sqn | | Died August 2002 |
| Sanders, Philip James | Sqn Ldr | BR | 92 Sqn (CO) | DFC | Died 1989 |
| Sandifer, Alfred Kemp | Sgt | BR | 604 Sqn | | |
| Sargent, Robert Edward Butler | Sgt | BR | 219 Sqn | AFC | |
| Sarre, Alfred Richard | Sgt | BR | 603 Sqn | | Died 1980 |
| Sasak, Wilhelm | Sgt | POL | 32 Sqn | | KIA 30 November 1940 |
| Satchell, William Arthur John | Sqn Ldr | BR | 302 Sqn (CO) | DSO | Died March 1986 |
| Saunders, Albert Fredrick Charles | Plt Off | BR | 92 Sqn | | KIA 7 September 1940 |
| Saunders, Cecil Henry | Plt Off | BR | 92 Sqn | | |
| Saunders, Gerald Alfred Wellesley | Flt Lt | BR | 65 Sqn | DFC | |
| Savage, Thomas Wood | Sgt | BR | 64 Sqn | | KIA 10 July 1943 |
| Savill, Joseph Ernest | Sgt | BR | 242, 151 & 501 Sqns | | |
| Saward, Cyril Joseph | Sgt | BR | 615 & 501 Sqns | | Died 1988 |
| Sawicz, Tadeusz | Fg Off | POL | 303 Sqn | VM, KW***, DFC | Died 19 October 2011 in Toronto, Canada, as last living Polish pilot participating in Battle of Britain. In 2006 promoted by President of Poland to rank of Brigade General. |
| Sawyer, Henry Cecil | Sqn Ldr | BR | 65 Sqn | | KIA 2 August 1940 |
| Sayers, James Edgar "Jimmy" | Flt Sgt | BR | 41 Sqn | | Born 10 April 1910; Re-mustered to engine fitter October 1940; discharged from RAF as Warrant Officer January 1953 |
| Schadtler-Law, Kennith | Plt Off | BR | 605 Sqn | | Died 1986; After war changed name to Law |
| Schollar, Edward Cranston | Plt Off | BR | 248 Sqn | | |
| Schumer, Francis Herbert | Plt Off | BR | 600 Sqn | | KIA 12 July 1941 (Pilot) |
| Schwind, Lionel Harold | Flt Lt | BR | 257, 43 & 213 Sqns | | KIA 27 September 1940 (Pilot) |
| Sclander, Kirkpatrick Maclure | Plt Off | CAN | 242 Sqn | | KIA 9 September 1940 (Pilot) |
| Scott, Alfred Enoch | Sgt | BR | 73 Sqn & 422 Flt | | MIA 19 August 1942 |
| Scott, Alec Maxtone Wright | Plt Off | BR | 3 & 607 Sqns | | KIA 2 January 1941 (Pilot) |
| Scott, Douglas Reginald | Flt Lt | BR | 605 Sqn | AFC | KIA 8 November 1941 (Pilot) |
| Scott, Donald Stuart | Plt Off | BR | 73 Sqn | DFC | |
| Scott, Ernest | Sgt | BR | 222 Sqn | | KIA 27 September 1940 (AIR ACE 5/3/0 KILLS) |
| Scott, George Wardrop | Sgt | BR | 64 & 19 Sqns | AFC | Died 1986 |
| Scott, John Alan | Sgt | BR | 246 Sqn | | KIA 27 October 1940 |
| Scott, Ronald Hamilton | Fg Off | BR | 604 Sqn | | |
| Scott, William Jack | Sgt | NZ | 246 Sqn | | |
| Scott, William John Moir "Jack" & "Scotty" | Fg Off | BR | 41 Sqn | | Born Dundee, Scotland 14 June 1915; KIA 8 September 1940 off Dover aged 25. He was the son of William Moir Scott and Katherine Ellen Scott, of South Kensington, London, and is buried in Dundee Western Cemetery, Angus, Scotland, Section 19, Grave 25C |
| Scott-Malden, David Francis Stephen | Fg Off | BR | 611 & 603 Sqns | DSO, DFC*, NWC | |
| Scrase, George Edward Thomas | Fg Off | BR | 600 Sqn | | KIA 28 September 1941 |
| Seabourne, Eric William | Sgt | BR | 238 Sqn | DFC | |
| Sears, Lionel Argent | Plt Off | BR | 145 Sqn | | MIA 8 August 1940 |
| Secretan, Dennis | Plt Off | BR | 54 & 72 Sqns | DFC | |
| Šeda, Karel | Sgt | CZ | 310 Sqn | | Died 15 June 1992 |
| Seddon, John Wilfred | Plt Off | BR | 601 Sqn | | KIA 31 March 1941 (Pilot) |
| Seghers, Eugene Georges Achilles | Plt Off | BEL | 46 & 32 Sqns | | KIA 26 July 1944 |
| Sellers, Raymond Frederick | Sgt | BR | 111 & 46 Sqns | AFC | Died 16 May 2010 |
| Selway, John Barry | Fg Off | BR | 604 Sqn | DFC | |
| Senior, Benjamin | Sgt | BR | 600 Sqn | | |
| Senior, John Norman | Sgt | BR | 23 Sqn | | KIA 21 March 1941 (Pilot) |
| Seredyn, Antoni | Sgt | POL | 32 Sqn | KW | |
| Service, Arthur | Sgt | BR | 29 Sqn | | KIA 15 October 1941 (Wireless Operator/Air Gunner) |
| Sewell, Donald Alec | Sgt | BR | 17 Sqn | | MIA 19 March 1944 |
| Shanahan, Martin Michael | Plt Off | BR | 1 Sqn | | MIA 16 August 1940 |
| Shand, Michael Moray | Plt Off | NZ | 54 Sqn | | Died 22 December 2007 Took part in The Great Escape |
| Sharman, Herbert Ronald | Plt Off | BR | 248 Sqn | | |
| Sharp, Bruce Robertson | Sgt | BR | 235 Sqn | | MIA 11 September 1940 |
| Sharp, Leslie Mark | Plt Off | BR | 111 Sqn | | KIA 28 December 1940 (Pilot) |
| Sharp, Ronald James | Sgt | BR | 236 Sqn | | |
| Sharpley, Hugh | Sgt | BR | 234 Sqn | | KIA 16 November 1940 |
| Sharratt, William Gordon | Sgt | BR | 248 Sqn | | MIA 2 July 1941 |
| Shaw, Frederick James | PO (FAA) | BR | 804 NAS | | MIA 2 August 1942 |
| Shaw, Ian Garstin | Fg Off | BR | 264 Sqn | | MIA 24 August 1940 |
| Shaw, Robert Henry | Plt Off | BR | 1 Sqn | | MIA 3 September 1940 |
| Shead, Harold Frederick William | Sgt | BR | 257 & 32 Sqns | | Died 1981 |
| Sheard, Horace | Sgt | BR | 236 Sqn | | MIA 21 March 1941 |
| Sheen, Desmond Frederick Burt | Fg Off | AUS | 72 Sqn | DFC* | Died June 2001 |
| Shepherd, Frederick Ernest Richard | Sgt | BR | 611 Sqn | | KIA 11 September 1940 (Pilot) |
| Shepherd, Franics William | Sgt | BR | 264 Sqn | | KIA 27 July 1944 (Wireless Operator/Air Gunner) |
| Shepherd, John Bean "Shep" | Sgt | BR | 234 Sqn | DFC** | Born Edinburgh 20 July 1919; Commissioned August 1941; CO, 8 April 1945 – 22 January 1946; KIFA 22 January 1946 at Wunsdorf, aged 26; son of William & Rosetta Shepherd of Edinburgh; buried in Hamburg Cemetery, Germany, Grave 5A, G9 |
| Shepley, Douglas Clayton | Plt Off | BR | 152 Sqn | | MIA 12 August 1940 |
| Shepperd, George Edward | Sgt | BR | 219 Sqn | | KIA 30 September 1940 (Air Gunner) |
| Sheppherd, Edmund Eric | Sgt | BR | 152 Sqn | | KIA 18 October 1940 (Pilot) |
| Sheridan, Stephen | Sgt | BR | 236 Sqn | | (Wireless Operator/Air Gunner) |
| Sherrington, Thomas Baldwin Aloysius | Plt Off | BR | 92 Sqn | | Died 1 March 2008 |
| Shipman, Edward Andrew "Shippy" | Plt Off | BR | 41 Sqn | AFC | Born Stathern, Melton Mowbray 9 December 1909; Commissioned April 1940; retired December 1959 retaining Wg Cdr; died August 1998 |
| Shirley, Sidney Harry James | Sgt | BR | 604 Sqn | | KIA 24 July 1941 (Air Gunner) |
| Shorrocks, Norman Basil | Plt Off | BR | 235 Sqn | | MIA 11 September 1940 |
| Sibley, Frederick Albert | Sgt | BR | 238 Sqn | | MIA 1 October 1940 |
| Sika, Jaroslav | Sgt | CZ | 43 Sqn | | |
| Silk, Frank Harry | Sgt | BR | 111 Sqn | DFC | Died 25 August 1970 |
| Silver, William Gerald | Sgt | BR | 152 Sqn | | KIA 25 September 1940 (Pilot) |
| Silvester, George Frederick | Sgt | BR | 229 Sqn | DFC | |
| Sim, Robert Black | Sgt | BR | 111 Sqn | | KIA 11 August 1940 (Pilot) |
| Simmonds, Vernon Churchill | Plt Off | BR | 238 Sqn | | Died 23 February 2003 |
| Simpson, Geoffrey Mervyn | Plt Off | NZ | 229 Sqn | | MIA 26 October 1940 |
| Simpson, John William Charles | Flt Lt | BR | 43 Sqn | DFC | |
| Simpson, Leslie William | Plt Off | 141 & 264 Sqns | | | |
| Simpson, Peter James | Plt Off | 111 & 64 Sqns | | Died 1987 | |
| Sims, Ivor Reginald | Sgt | BR | 248 Sqn | | KIA 13 January 1945 |
| Sims, James Ayscough | Plt Off | BR | 2 & 232 Sqns | | Died 1977 |
| Sinclair, Gordon Leonard | Fg Off | BR | 310 Sqn | DFC | Died 26 June 2005 |
| Sinclair, John | Plt Off | BR | 219 Sqn | | Died 5 September 2001 |
| Sing, John Eric James "Jackie" | Flt Lt | BR | 213 Sqn | | |
| Siudak, Antoni | Sgt | POL | 303 Sqn | VM, KW | KIA 6 October 1940 |
| Sizer, Wilfred Max "Bill" | Plt Off | BR | 213 Sqn | | Died 22 December 2006 |
| Skalski, Stanisław | Plt Off | POL | 302 & 501 Sqns | VM IV & V, KW***, DSO, DFC** | Died 12 November 2004 |
| Skillen, Victor Hall | Sgt | BR | 29 Sqn | | KIA 11 March 1941 |
| Skinner, Charles David Evelyn | Fg Off | BR | 604 Sqn | | |
| Skinner, Wilfred Malcom | Sgt | BR | 74 Sqn | DFM | Died 26 June 2003 |
| Skinner, Stanley Hewitt | Flt Lt | BR | 604 Sqn | | MIA 19 August 1942 |
| Skowron, Henryk | Sgt | POL | 303 Sqn | | KIA 18 June 1941 |
| Slade, John William | Sgt | BR | 64 Sqn | DFC | KIA 19 September 1945 (Greece) |
| Slatter, Dudley Malins | Plt Off | BR | 141 Sqn | | KIA 19 July 1940 |
| Sleigh, James Wallace | Lt (FAA) | BR | 804 NAS | | |
| Šlouf, Václav | Sgt | CZ | 312 Sqn | | Died 13 April 1976 |
| Sly, Oswald Kenneth | Sgt | BR | 29 Sqn | | MIA 13 October 1940 |
| Smallman, James | Sgt | BR | 23 Sqn | | |
| Smart, Thomas | Plt Off | BR | 65 Sqn | DFC* | KIA 12 April 1943 |
| Smith, Alexander | Sgt | BR | 600 Sqn | | MIA 22 August 1941 |
| Smith, Arthur Dumbbell | Sgt | BR | 66 Sqn | | KIA 6 September 1940 (Pilot) |
| Smith, Arthur Joseph | Plt Off | BR | 74 Sqn | | |
| Smith, Andrew Thomas | Sqn Ldr | BR | 610 Sqn | | KIA 25 July 1940 (Pilot) |
| Smith, Arthur William | Plt Off | BR | 141 Sqn | | KIA 28 March 1941 |
| Smith, Christopher Dermont Salmond | Flt Lt | BR | 25 Sqn | DFC | MIA 22 December 1941 |
| Smith, Denis Norman Evelyn | Plt Off | BR | 74 Sqn | | KIA 11 August 1940 (Pilot) |
| Smith, Donald Sydney | Fg Off | BR | 616 Sqn | | KIA 28 September 1940 (Pilot) |
| Smith, Edward Brian Bretherton | Flt Lt | BR | 610 Sqn | DFC | 12 January 1915 – 15 September 2015 |
| Smith, Eric Claud | Sgt | BR | 600 Sqn | | |
| Smith, Eric Leigh | Plt Off | BR | 604 Sqn | | Died 5 November 1978 |
| Smith, Edward Stanley | Fg Off | BR | 600 Sqn | SFC | |
| Smith, Frank | Sgt | BR | 604 Sqn | | MIA 5 September 1942 |
| Smith, Francis Alan | Sub Lt (FAA) | BR | 145 Sqn | | MIA 8 August 1940 |
| Smith, Forgrave Marshall "Hiram" | Fg Off | CAN | 72 Sqn | DFC | |
| Smith, Godfrey Ernest | Sgt | BR | 254 Sqn | | Died 1980 |
| Smith, Irving Stanley | Plt Off | NZ | 151 Sqn | DFC*, OBE, CBE | Died 1999 |
| Smith, James Duncan | Plt Off | CAN | 73 Sqn | | KIA 14 April 1941 (Pilot) |
| Smith, Kenneth Barton | Sgt | BR | 247 Sqn | | MIA 8 August 1940 |
| Smith, Leonard | Sgt | BR | 219 Sqn | | Died 2010 |
| Smith, Leslie Ernest | Sgt | BR | 234 & 602 Sqn | | |
| Smith, Norman Henry Jackson | Plt Off | BR | 235 Sqn | DFC | Surviving aircrew After war changed name to Jackson-Smith |
| Smith, Percy Ronald | Sgt | BR | 236 Sqn | | MIA 24 November 1940 |
| Smith, Phillip Richard | Plt Off | BR | 25 Sqn | | MIA 4 April 1943 |
| Smith, Reginald Cyril | Sgt | BR | 236 Sqn | | MIA 19 July 1941 |
| Smith, Roddick Lee | Flt Lt | BR | 151 Sqn | | |
| Smith, Robert Rutherford | Fg Off | CAN | 229 Sqn | DFC | Died in 1960s |
| Smith, William Alexander | Flt Lt | BR | 229 Sqn | | |
| Smith, William Bruce | Sgt | CAN | 602 Sqn | | Died 17 June 1975 |
| Smith, Wynford Ormonde Leoni | Flt Lt | BR | 263 Sqn | | KIA 29 December 1940 (Pilot) |
| Smither, Ross | Fg Off | CAN | 1 Sqn RCAF | | KIA 15 September 1940 (Pilot) |
| Smithers, Julian Langley "Jakes" | Plt Off | BR | 601 Sqn | | KIA 11 August 1940 (Pilot) |
| Smithson, Richard | Sgt | BR | 249 Sqn | | KIA 22 July 1941 (Pilot) |
| Smyth, Ronald Henry | Sgt | BR | 25, 111 & 249 Sqns | AFC | Surviving aircrew (born 1922) |
| Smythe, George | Sgt | BR | 56 Sqn | MBE, DFM | |
| Smythe, Derek Myles Altamont | Fg Off | BR | 264 Sqn | | |
| Smythe, Rupert Frederick | Plt Off | BR | 32 Sqn | | |
| Snell, Vivian Robert | Plt Off | BR | 151 & 501 Sqns | | |
| Snowdon, Ernest George | Sgt | BR | 213 Sqn | | Died 20 November 1947 |
| Soars, Harold John | Sgt | BR | 74 Sqn | | Died 1975 |
| Sobey, Philip Alfred | Sgt | BR | 235 Sqn | | KIA 9 November 1940 |
| Soden, John Flewelling | Plt Off | BR | 266 & 603 Sqn | | KIA 12 September 1942 |
| Solak, Jerzy Jakub "George" | Plt Off | POL | 151 & 249 Sqn | Born Przecław, Kraków, Poland, 22 August 1910; Commissioned March 1941; shot down southwest of Caen, France, 10 August 1944 captured but escaped; emigrated to USA 1946; died 5 March 2002 | |
| Solomon, Neville David | Plt Off | BR | 29 & 17 Sqn | | KIA 18 August 1940 |
| Sones, Lawrence Charles | Sgt | BR | 605 Sqn | | |
| Southall, George | Sgt | BR | 23 Sqn | | KIA 22 December 1940 (Air Gunner) |
| Southorn, George Albert | Sgt | BR | 235 Sqn | | |
| Southwell, John Sydney | Sgt | BR | 245 Sqn | | KIA 22 March 1941 |
| Spears, Arthur William Peter | Sgt | BR | 222 Sqn & 421 Flt | | |
| Speke, Hugh | Flt Lt | BR | 604 Sqn | DFC | KIA 26 July 1941 |
| Spence, Douglas James | Plt Off | NZ | 245 Sqn | | KIA 30 April 1941 |
| Spencer, Desmond Gerard Heath | Sqn Ldr | BR | 266 Sqn | MBE | |
| Spencer, Gordon Hamilton | Sgt | BR | 504 Sqn | | |
| Spiers, Aubrey H | Sgt | BR | 236 Sqn | | Died 1988 |
| Spires, John Henry | Sgt | BR | 235 Sqn | DFC, DFM | |
| Sprague, Henry | Plt Off | CAN | 3 Sqn | | Surviving aircrew |
| Sprague, Mervyn Herbert | Sgt | BR | 602 Sqn | | KIA 11 September 1940 |
| Sprenger, William Paterson | Fg Off | CAN | 1 Sqn RCAF | | KIA 26 November 1940 |
| Spurdle, Robert | Plt Off | NZ | 74 Sqn | DFC* | Died 5 March 1994 |
| Spyer, Richard Alfred | Sgt | BR | 607 Sqn | | KIA 22 March 1941 |
| Squier, John William Copous | Sgt | BR | 64 Sqn | QCVSA | Died 30 January 2006 |
| Stanger, Noel Mizpah | Sgt | NZ | 235 Sqn | | KIA 14 February 1941 |
| Stanley, Donald Arthur | Plt Off | BR | 64 Sqn | | KIA 25 February 1941 |
| Stanley, Douglas Owen | Sgt | NZ | 151 Sqn | | WIA 26 October 1940; DOW 27 October 1940 |
| Stansfeld, Noel Karl | Plt Off | CAN | 242 & 229 Sqns | DFC*, Czech Medal for Bravery | |
| Staples, Lionel | Sgt | BR | 85, 242 & 151 Sqns | | |
| Staples, Michael Edmund | Plt Off | BR | 609 Sqn | | KIA 9 November 1941 |
| Staples, Robert Charles John | Sgt | BR | 72 Sqn | | Died 1986 |
| Stapleton, Basil Gerald "Stapme" | Plt Off | SA | 603 Sqn | DFC | Died 13 April 2010 |
| Starr, Harold Morley | Sqn Ldr | BR | 245 & 253 Sqns | | KIA 31 August 1940 |
| Stavert, Charles Michael | Plt Off | BR | 1 & 504 Sqns | | |
| Steadman, Dennis James | Sgt | BR | 54 & 245 Sqns | | |
| Steborowski, Michal Jan | Fg Off | POL | 238 Sqn | KW | MIA 11 August 1940 |
| Steele, Rodney Murrey | Sgt | BR | 235 Sqn | | |
| Steere, Harry | FSgt | BR | 19 Sqn | DFM | KIA 9 June 1944 |
| Steere, Jack | FSgt | BR | 72 Sqn | DFC | |
| Štefan, Jan | Sgt | CZ | 1 Sqn | | |
| Stegman, S | Plt Off | POL | 229 Sqn | KW* | KIA 17 June 1943 |
| Stehlík, Josef | Sgt | CZ | 312 Sqn | | Died 30 May 1991 |
| Stein, David | Plt Off | BR | 263 Sqn | | KIA 30 October 1941 |
| Stenhouse, S | Sgt | BR | 43 Sqn | | |
| Stephen, Harbourne Mackay | Plt Off | BR | 74 Sqn | DFC | |
| Stephens, Cyril | Sgt | BR | 23 Sqn | | KIA 8 August 1940 |
| Stephens, Maurice Michael | Fg Off | BR | 232 Sqn (CO) | DFC**, DSO | Died 23 September 2004 |
| Stephenson, Ian Raitt | Fg Off | BR | 264 Sqn | | KIA 26 November 1943 |
| Stephenson, Patrick Joseph Thomas | Plt Off | BR | 607 Sqn | DFC | Died May 2003 |
| Stephenson, Stanley Philip | Fg Off | BR | 85 Sqn | | |
| Štěrbáček, Jaroslav | Plt Off | CZ | 310 Sqn | | MIA 31 August 1940 |
| Stevens, Eldred John | Plt Off | BR | 141 Sqn | | |
| Stevens, Geoffrey | Sgt | BR | 213 & 151 Sqns | | Died April 2006 |
| Stevens, Leonard Walter | Plt Off | BR | 17 Sqn | | KIA 21 May 1941 |
| Stevens, Robert Edward | Sgt | BR | 29 Sqn | | MIA 11 October 1940 |
| Stevens, Richard Playne | Sgt | BR | 151 Sqn | DSO, DFC* | KIA 15 December 1941 |
| Stevens, William Ronald | Sgt | BR | 23 Sqn | DFM | Surviving aircrew |
| Stevenson, Peter Charles Fasken | Plt Off | BR | 74 Sqn | DFC | KIA 13 February 1943 |
| Steward, George Arthur | Sgt | BR | 17 Sqn | DFM | KIA 23 October 1941 |
| Stewart, Charles | Plt Off | NZ | 54 & 222 Sqns | | KIA 15 March 1941 |
| Stewart, Charles Noel Douglas | Sgt | BR | 604 Sqn | | KIA 31 May 1942 |
| Stewart, Donald George Alexander | Fg Off | BR | 615 Sqn | | KIA 15 February 1941 |
| Stewart, H G | Sgt | BR | 236 Sqn | | Surviving aircrew |
| Stewart-Clarke(e), Dudley | Plt Off | BR | 603 Sqn | | KIA 9 September 1941 |
| Stickney, Philip Ambrose Meynell | Flt Lt | BR | 235 Sqn | | |
| Stillwell, Ronald Leslie | Sgt | BR | 65 Sqn | DFM | |
| Stock, Eric | AC2 | BR | 604 Sqn | | |
| Stocks, Norman James | Sgt | BR | 248 Sqn | | MIA 20 October 1940 |
| Stockwell, William Eric John | PO (FAA) | BR | 804 NAS | | |
| Stoddart, Kenneth Maxwell | Flt Lt | BR | 611 Sqn | KCVO, KStJ, AE | Died 26 December 2008 |
| Stokes, Richard William | Sgt | BR | 254 Sqn | | KIA 29 May 1942 |
| Stokoe, Jack | Sgt | BR | 603 Sqn | | |
| Stokoe, Sydney | Sgt | BR | 29 Sqn | | Killed Flying Accident 19 December 1940 |
| Stone, Cedric Arthur Cuthbert | Flt Lt | BR | 263 & 245 Sqns | DFC | |
| Stones, Donald William Alfred | Plt Off | BR | 79 Sqn | DFC | |
| Stoney, George Edward Bowes | Flt Lt | BR | 501 Sqn | | KIA 18 August 1940 |
| Stoodley, Donald Raymond | Sgt | BR | 43 Sqn | | KIA 24 October 1940 |
| Storie, John Munro | Plt Off | BR | 615 & 607 Sqns | | |
| Storrar, James Eric "Jas" | Plt Off | BR | 145 & 73 Sqns & 603 Flt | DFC | |
| Storrie, Alexander James | Plt Off | BR | 264 Sqn | | KIA 20 November 1940 |
| Straight, Whitney Willard | Plt Off | AME | 601 Sqn | CBE, MC, DFC | Died 5 April 1979 |
| Strang, John Talbot | Fg Off | NZ | 253 Sqn | | Died 17 July 1979 |
| Streatfield, Victor Charles Frederick | Sqn Ldr | BR | 248 Sqn | OBE | Later dismissed from the RAF by sentence of General Court Martial, 9 June 1950. |
| Stretch, Reginald Robert | Sgt | BR | 235 Sqn | | |
| Strickland, Claude Dobree | Plt Off | BR | 615 Sqn | | KIA 27 October 1941 |
| Strickland, James Murray | Flt Lt | BR | 213 Sqn | | KIA 14 August 1941 |
| Střihavka, Jaromír | FSgt | CZ | 85 & 310 Sqns | | After war changed name to Scott |
| Stroud, George Alfred | Sgt | BR | 504, 32 & 249 Sqns | | |
| Stuart, Michael | AC | BR | 23 Sqn | | |
| Stubbs, Dennis Raymond W | Plt Off | BR | 601 Sqn | DSO, OBE, DFC | Died February 1973 |
| Stuckey, Sidney George | Sgt | BR | 213 Sqn | | MIA 12 August 1940 |
| Studd, John Alnod Peter | Plt Off | BR | 66 Sqn | | KIA 19 August 1940 (Spitfire N3182) |
| Sulman, John Edward | Plt Off | BR | 607 Sqn | | KIA 23 November 1941 |
| Summers, Richard Gordon Battensby | Sgt | BR | 219 Sqn | OBE, OStJ, AFM | Surviving aircrew (born 1921) |
| Sumner, Frank | Sgt | BR | 23 Sqn | | KIA 30 November 1941 |
| Sumpter, Claude Harry Sidney | AC | BR | 604 Sqn | | |
| Surma, Franciszek | Plt Off | POL | 151, 607 & 257 Sqns | VM, KW** | KIA 8 November 1941 |
| Sutcliffe, William Alfred | Sgt | BR | 610 Sqn | | KIA 17 December 1940 |
| Sutherland, Ian Welsh | Plt Off | BR | 19 Sqn | | KIA 4 August 1940 |
| Sutton, Fraser Barton | Fg Off | BR | 56 Sqn | DFC | Died 16 March 1988 |
| Sutton, Frederick Charles | Plt Off | BR | 264 Sqn | | Died 1981 |
| Sutton, Harold Robert | Sgt | BR | 235 Sqn | | |
| Sutton, James Ronald Gabert | Sgt | BR | 611 Sqn | | KIA 23 July 1941 |
| Sutton, Kenwyn Roland | Fg Off | NZ | 264 Sqn | DFC | |
| Sutton, Norman | Plt Off | BR | 611 & 72 Sqns | | KIA 8 October 1940 |
| Swanwick, George William | Sgt | BR | 54 Sqn | AE | Born New York (USA) 10 November 1915; joined RAF as Air Gunner, March 1934; Accepted for pilot training October 1938; commissioned October 1941; retired April 1970, retaining rank of Wg Cdr. Died, aged 95, in 2011. |
| Swanwick, N T C | Sgt | BR | 141 Sqn | | |
| Switon, Leon | Sgt | POL | 54 & 303 Sqns | | |
| Sword-Daniels, Albert Thomas | Plt Off | BR | 25 Sqn | | |
| Sydney, Charles | FSgt | BR | 19, 266 & 92 Sqns | | KIA 27 September 1940 |
| Sykes, Duncan Broadford | Sgt | BR | 145 Sqn | | |
| Sykes, John Humphrey Charlesworth | Sub Lt (FAA) | BR | 64 Sqn | | Surviving aircrew |
| Sylvester, Edmund John Hilary | Plt Off | BR | 501 Sqn | DFC | MIA 20 July 1940 |
| Symonds, John Edward | Sgt | BR | 236 Sqn | | |
| Szafraniec, Wilhelm | Sgt | POL | 151, 607 & 56 Sqns | | KIA 23 November 1940 |
| Szaposznikow, Eugeniusz | Sgt | POL | 303 Sqn | VM, KW**, DFM | After war changed surname to Sharman |
| Szczesny, Henryk | Plt Off | POL | 74 Sqn | VM, KW***, DFC | Later in 317 Polish Fighter Squadron. Died 25 July 1996 in London. |
| Szlagowski, Jozef | Sgt | POL | 234 & 152 Sqns | KW | Died 4 December 1993 |
| Szulkowski, Wladyslaw | Plt Off | POL | 65 Sqn | KW | KIA 27 March 1941 |

== T ==
| Name | Rank | Nationality | Sqn during Battle | Decorations | Notes | | | | | | | |
|---|---|---|---|---|---|---|---|---|---|---|---|---|
| Tabor, George William | Sgt | BR | 65 & 152 Sqns | | KIA 23 July 1941 (over France) | | | | | | | |
| Tait, Kenneth William | Fg Off | NZ | 87 Sqn | DFC | MIA 4 August 1941 | | | | | | | |
| Talman, James MacGill | Plt Off | BR | 213; 145 | DFC | MIA 10 July 1944 | | | | | | | |
| Tamblyn, Hugh Norman | Flt Lt | CAN | 141; 242 | DFC | KIA 3 April 1941 | | | | | | | |
| Tanner, John Henry | Flt Sgt | BR | 610 Sqn | | KIA 11 August 1940 (Pilot) | | | | | | | |
| Tatnell, Reginald Frederick | Sgt | BR | 235 Sqn | | KIA 18 May 1941 (Pilot) | | | | | | | |
| Taylor, Dennis Edward | PO (FAA) | BR | 808 NAS | | Died 7 October 1978 | | | | | | | |
| Taylor, Donald Murray | Fg Off | BR | 64 Sqn | DFC | Died 1977 | | | | | | | |
| Taylor, Edgar Francis | AC | BR | 29 & 600 Sqn | | KIA 22 October 1943 (Air Gunner) | | | | | | | |
| Taylor, Graham Neville | Sgt | BR | 236 Sqn | AFC | | | | | | | | |
| Taylor, George Stringer | Sgt | NZ | 3 Sqn | | KIA 9 February 1943 | | | | | | | |
| Taylor, Kenneth | Sgt | BR | 600, 29 & 307 Sqn | DFC | Surviving Pilot Officer. Retired from RAF June 1971 as Sqn Leader. Died 1989 | | | | | | | |
| Taylor, Reginald | Plt Off | BR | 235 Sqn | | Died 10 June 1950 | | | | | | | |
| Taylor, Ronald Henry William | Sgt | BR | 604 Sqn | | KIA 26 November 1940 (Air Gunner) | | | | | | | |
| Taylor, Norman | Sgt | BR | 601 Sqn | | Ace; KIFA 28 April 1948 | | | | | | | |
| Taylour, Edward Winchester Tollemache | Lt (FAA) | BR | 808 NAS | DSC | KIA 13 September 1942 | | | | | | | |
| Tearle, Francis Joseph | Sgt | BR | 600 Sqn | DFC | | | | | | | | |
| Temlett, Cyril Bernard | Plt Off | BR | 3 Sqn | DFC | KIA 3 July 1942 | | | | | | | |
| Terry, Patrick Hugh Richard Runciman | Sgt | BR | 72 & 603 Sqn | | | | | | | | | |
| Tew, Philip Harry | Flt Sgt | BR | 54 Sqn | AFC | Died 1984 | | | | | | | |
| Thacker, David John | Plt Off | BR | 32 Sqn | | | | | | | | | |
| Theasby, Alec John | AC1 | BR | 25 Sqn | | KIA 16 November 1940 (Radio Operator) | | | | | | | |
| Theilmann, John Graham | Flt Sgt | BR | 234 Sqn | | died April 1985 | | | | | | | |
| Thomas, Alexander Hendry | Sgt | BR | 79; 87 | DFC, FRICS | Surviving aircrew | | | | | | | |
| Thomas, Charles Raymond Delauney | Fg Off | BR | 236 Sqn | | KIA 18 July 1940 (Pilot) | | | | | | | |
| Thomas, Gordon Sinclair | Sgt | BR | 604 Sqn | | | | | | | | | |
| Thomas, Eric Hugh | Fg Off | BR | 222; 266 | DFC | Died 1972 | | | | | | | |
| Thomas, Frederick Mytton | Flt Lt | BR | 152 Sqn | | | | | | | | | |
| Thomas, Richard Ceredig | Plt Off | BR | 235 Sqn | | KIA 9 October 1940 (Observer) | | | | | | | |
| Thomas, Robert Tudor | Sgt | BR | 247 Sqn | | KIA 21 November 1940 | | | | | | | |
| Thomas, Samuel Richard | Plt Off | BR | 264 Sqn | DFC, AFC | Captured as PoW. | | | | | | | |
| Thompson, Anthony Robert Fletcher | Fg Off | BR | 85; 249 | DFC | Died 9 March 2008 | | | | | | | |
| Thompson, Frank Noble | Plt Off | BR | 248 Sqn | | | | | | | | | |
| Thompson, Joseph Beckett | Sgt | BR | 25 Sqn | | KIA 31 July 1940 (Pilot) following a collision between Blenheims L6722 and L1408 over the Bristol Channel. | | | | | | | |
| Thompson, John Marlow | Sqn Ldr | BR | 111 Sqn (CO) | DFC, DSO, AFC, CBE | Later Air Commodore; died 1994 | | | | | | | |
| Thompson, John Rauthmell | Sgt | BR | 236 Sqn | | MIA 10 March 1941 | | | | | | | |
| Thompson, Peter Douglas | Plt Off | BR | 32 & 605 Sqns | DFC | Surviving aircrew | | | | | | | |
| Thompson, William Watson | Sgt | BR | 234 Sqn | | Died 1986 | | | | | | | |
| Thomson, James Anderson | Flt Lt | BR | 302 Sqn | | | | | | | | | |
| Thomson, Ronald Alexander | Fg Off | BR | 72 Sqn | | | Thomson Ronald Sgt 616 Sqn Died 2002 | Thomson, Thomas Russell | Plt Off | BR | 607; 213 | OBE | Died 31 March 2008 |
| Thorn, Edward Roland | Sgt | BR | 264 Sqn | DFC*DFM* | Thorne (pilot) and air gunner F J Barker, were the most successful Boulton Paul Defiant crew of the war with more than 13 kills. KIFA 12 February 1946 | | | | | | | |
| Thorogood, Laurence Arthur | Sgt | BR | 87 Sqn | | | | | | | | | |
| Thorpe, Peter | Sgt | BR | 145 Sqn | | | | | | | | | |
| Tidman, Alfred Roberts | Plt Off | BR | 64 Sqn | | KIA 17 September 1941 (Pilot) | | | | | | | |
| Till, John | Sgt | BR | 248 Sqn | | KIA 12 June 1941 | | | | | | | |
| Tillard, Rupert Claude | Lt (FAA) | BR | 808 NAS | DSC | KIA 8 May 1941 | | | | | | | |
| Tillett, James | Plt Off | BR | 238 Sqn | | KIA 6 November 1940 | | | | | | | |
| Titley, Edward George | Plt Off | BR | 609 Sqn | | KIA 17 July 1943 | | | | | | | |
| Tobin, Eugene Quimby "Red" | Plt Off | AME | 609 Sqn | | KIA 7 September 1941 | | | | | | | |
| Tomlinson, Paul Anthony | Plt Off | BR | 29 Sqn | | | | | | | | | |
| Tongue, Reginald Ellis | Plt Off | BR | 3; 504 | | | | | | | | | |
| Toogood, Leonard Vivian | Sgt | BR | 43 Sqn | | KIA 27 October 1940 (Pilot) | | | | | | | |
| Toombs, Frank Albert | Plt Off | BR | 264 Sqn | | KIA 15 November 1940 (Pilot) | | | | | | | |
| Toombs, John Richard | Sgt | BR | 236 & 264 Sqn | | | | | | | | | |
| Topham, John Groves | Plt Off | BR | 219 Sqn | DSO DFC* | 1917-1987 Ace | | | | | | | |
| Topolnicki, Juliusz | Fg Off | POL | 601 Sqn | KW | KIA 21 September 1940 | | | | | | | |
| Touch, Donald Frank | Sgt | BR | 235 Sqn | AFC | | | | | | | | |
| Tower-Perkins, William | Plt Off | BR | 238 Sqn | | | | | | | | | |
| Townsend, Peter Wooldridge | Sqn Ldr | BR | 85 Sqn (CO) | DFC*, DSO | Died June 1995 | | | | | | | |
| Townshend, Thomas William | Sgt | BR | 600 Sqn | | 31 May 1918 – 2 June 2013 | | | | | | | |
| Tracey, Owen Vincent | Plt Off | NZ | 79 Sqn | DFC | KIA 8 December 1941 (Pilot) | | | | | | | |
| Trevana, Charles Warren | Fg Off | CAN | 1 RCAF Sqn | | | | | | | | | |
| Trousdale, Richard Macklow | Plt Off | NZ | 266 Sqn | | KIFA 16 May 1947 | | | | | | | |
| Trueman, Alec Albert Gray | Fg Off | CAN | 253 Sqn | | KIA 4 September 1940 (Note: Listed as British by CWGC) | | | | | | | |
| Truhlář, Jan | Sgt | CZ | 312 Sqn | | Died 25 October 1973 | | | | | | | |
| Trumble, Anthony John "Tony" | Flt Lt | BR | 264 Sqn | | Taken POW in Greece, April 1941. Died 2004. | | | | | | | |
| Truran, Anthony John Jamieson | Plt Off | BR | 615 Sqn | | KIA 5 November 1940 | | | | | | | |
| Tuck, Robert Stanford | Flt Lt | BR | 92 Sqn & 257 Sqn (CO) | DSO, DFC**, AFC | Died 5 May 1987 | | | | | | | |
| Tucker, Aidan Boys | Fg Off | BR | 151 Sqn | | Died 1987 | | | | | | | |
| Tucker, Bernard Eric | Plt Off | BR | 266 & 66 Sqn | | | | | | | | | |
| Tucker, Frank Day | Sgt | BR | 236 Sqn | | | | | | | | | |
| Tucker, Ronald Yeoman | Sgt | BR | 235 Sqn | | MIA 18 July 1940 when his Blenheim N3541 failed to return from a sortie. | | | | | | | |
| Turley-George, Douglas Richard | Plt Off | BR | 54 Sqn | DFC | | | | | | | | |
| Turnbull, Robert Nesbit | Sgt | BR | 25 Sqn | DFC | Died 18 September 1980 | | | | | | | |
| Turner, Donald Eric | Flt Lt | BR | 238 Sqn | | MIA 8 August 1940 when his Hurricane P3823 was shot down in combat south of the Isle of Wight. | | | | | | | |
| Turner, Guy | Flt Sgt | BR | 32 Sqn | | Died 5 December 1982 | | | | | | | |
| Turner, Robert Charles | Sgt | BR | 264 Sqn | | Ace, KIA 28 August 1940 (Defiant Air Gunner) | | | | | | | |
| Turner, Percival Stanley "Stan" | Fg Off | CAN | 242 Sqn | DSO, DFC* | Died 23 July 1985 | | | | | | | |
| Tweed, Leslie John | Sgt | BR | 111 Sqn | | 17 October 1920 – 4 February 1985 | | | | | | | |
| Tweed, Thomas Reginald | Sgt | BR | 56 Sqn | | KIA 15 September 1940 when his Hurricane P3660 crashed during a practice dog fight. | | | | | | | |
| Twitchett, Francis John | Sgt | BR | 229 & 43 Sqn | | died 1998 | | | | | | | |
| Tyrer, Edward | Sgt | BR | 46 Sqn | | | | | | | | | |
| Tyson, Frank Hastings | Sqn Ldr | BR | 213 & 3 Sqn | | Died 30 December 1979 | | | | | | | |

== U ==
| Name | Rank | Nationality | Sqn during Battle | Awards | Notes |
|---|---|---|---|---|---|
| Unett, John Windsor | Sgt | BR | 235 Sqn | | KIA 27 December 1940 (Germany) (Wireless Operator/Air Gunner) |
| Unwin, George Cecil "Grumpy" | Flt Sgt | BR | 19 Sqn | DSO, DFM* | Retired as Wg Cdr in 1961; Died 29 June 2006 (died aged 93) |
| Upton, Hamilton Charles "Deryk" | Plt Off | BR | 43 & 607 Sqns | DFC | Died 1965 in Truro Nova Scotia - one son, Robin Charles Deryk Upton. Deryk transferred over to RCAF post Battle of Britain. In a training capacity - taught among others Buzz Berling. new Book titled I Would Have Gone on and On |
| Urbanowicz, Witold | Fg Off | POL | 145 & 303 Sqns | VM, KW***, DFC, Air Medal (US), Flying Cross ? (China) | In 1943 pilot of US 75th Squadron (Flying Tigers) in China. In 1995 promoted to the rank of General by President Walesa. Died 17 August 1996 in New York. |
| Urie, John Dunlop | Sqn Ldr | BR | 602 Sqn | | |
| Urwin-Mann, John Ronald "Jack" | Plt Off | CAN | 238 Sqn | DSO, DFC* | (died 1999) |
| Usmar, Frank | Sgt | BR | 41 Sqn | MiD | Born West Malling, Kent 16 September 1915; Shot down and seriously WIA (leg and face) 27 September 1940 and did not return to flying duties until June 1941; Commissioned December 1941; Retired September 1964 retaining rank of Sqn Ldr; Died 1998. |

== Notes on table ==
- Ranks given are those held during the Battle of Britain, although a higher rank may have been achieved after the Battle.
- All individuals listed in bold and highlighted in silver are believed to be still alive.
- Aircrew listed as KIA, MIA, WIA or KIFA during the Battle of Britain are highlighted in blue.
- The awards listed include those made during the Battle of Britain and during the remainder of World War II, as well as any made post-war.
- In order to limit the numbers of footnotes which would otherwise be required, the symbol ‡ under "Notes" indicates several entries in the text of Ramsay 1989, while the symbol † indicates that information on the circumstances under which an airman became a casualty during the Battle is included in the text of the book. Where more than one crew member of a multi place aircraft was involved this is included as a cross-reference under "Notes"
- In addition to 2,353 British aircrew, the RAF Roll of Honour recognises 574 personnel from other countries; namely:

Australia, Barbados, Belgium, Canada, Czechoslovakia, France, Ireland, Jamaica, Newfoundland, New Zealand, Poland, Rhodesia, South Africa and the United States.

=== Abbreviations ===
- (CO) after "Sqn" denotes Commanding Officer of that squadron, as per the RAF Fighter Command Order of Battle on 15 September 1940, unless otherwise indicated.
- (FAA) after a rank denotes a member of the Fleet Air Arm rather than the RAF.
- "KIA" - "killed in action"
- "KIFA" - "killed in flying accident", i.e. not during combat
- "MIA" - "missing in action".
- "WIA" - "wounded in action" leading to death which, in some cases, may have occurred months later.
- "POW" - "prisoner of war".
- For details of RAF rank abbreviations, see RAF Commissioned Officer Ranks and RAF Non-Commissioned Officer Ranks.
- For details of FAA rank abbreviations, see FAA Commissioned Officer Ranks.

=== Nationalities ===
| AME | American |
| AUS | Australian |
| BEL | Belgian |
| BR | British |
| CAN | Canadian |
| CZ | Czechoslovak |
| FR | French |
| IRE | Irish |
| NZ | New Zealander |
| POL | Poland |
| RHO | Rhodesian |
| SA | South African |

=== Awards ===
| Award | Title | Notes |
|---|---|---|
| AE | Air Efficiency Award | Awarded for ten years' efficient service in the Royal Auxiliary Air Force |
| AFC | Air Force Cross | Awarded for "an act or acts of valour, courage or devotion to duty whilst flying, though not in active operations against the enemy". |
| CB | Companion of The Order of the Bath | Awarded at the monarch's pleasure |
| CDeG | Croix de Guerre | A military decoration of both France and Belgium, also commonly bestowed to foreign military forces allied to France and Belgium. |
| CdeL | Croix de la Libération | A decoration of France awarded for very meritorious conduct with the Free French Forces during World War II. |
| CdeLd'H | Croix de Légion d'honneur | A decoration of France awarded for excellent civil or military conduct delivered, upon official investigation. |
| CdeLL | Croix de L'Ordre de Leopold | Awarded to Belgian nationals or some distinguished foreign persons who made very important contributions to the Belgian state or society. |
| DFC | Distinguished Flying Cross | Awarded to Royal Air Force commissioned officers and Warrant Officers for "an act or acts of valour, courage or devotion to duty whilst flying in active operations against the enemy". |
| DFC* | Distinguished Flying Cross and Bar | A bar is added to the ribbon for holders of the DFC who received a second award. |
| DFC** | Distinguished Flying Cross and Bar | A second bar is added to the ribbon for holders of the DFC and Bar who received a third award. |
| DFM | Distinguished Flying Medal | Awarded to military below commissioned rank, for "an act or acts of valour, courage or devotion to duty whilst flying in active operations against the enemy". |
| DSO | Distinguished Service Order | Awarded for meritorious or distinguished service by officers of the armed forces during wartime, typically in actual combat. |
| DSO* | Distinguished Service Order and Bar | A bar is added to the ribbon for holders of the DSO who received a second award. |
| DSO** | Distinguished Service Order and Two Bars | A second bar is added to the ribbon for holders of the DSO and Bar who received a third award. |
| GCB | Knight Grand Cross of The Order of the Bath | Awarded at the monarch's pleasure |
| KCVO | Knight Commander of the Royal Victorian Order | Awarded for personal service to the sovereign |
| KStJ | Knight of the Order of Saint John | |
| KW | Krzyz Walecznych, Polish "Cross of Valour" | Awarded to an individual who "has demonstrated deeds of valour and courage on the field of battle." |
| KZ | Krzyz Zaslugi, Polish "Cross of Merit" | Awarded for exemplary public service or humanitarian work that goes above and beyond the call of duty. |
| MBE | Member of the Order of the British Empire | Awarded at the monarch's pleasure |
| MC | Military Cross | Awarded for "an act or acts of exemplary gallantry during active operations against the enemy on land to all members, of any rank". |
| MM | Military Medal | Awarded for acts of gallantry and devotion to duty under fire |
| OBE | Officer of the Order of the British Empire | Awarded at the monarch's pleasure |
| OStJ | Officer of the Order of Saint John | |
| VC | Victoria Cross | Highest British military decoration, awarded for valour in the face of the enemy. |
| VM | Virtuti Militari | Highest Polish military award for courage in the face of the enemy. |

== See also ==
- Non-British personnel in the RAF during the Battle of Britain
- List of World War II aces from the United Kingdom
- List of World War II flying aces by country
- List of World War II flying aces
- List of RAF aircrew in the Battle of Britain (A–C)
- List of RAF aircrew in the Battle of Britain (D–F)
- List of RAF aircrew in the Battle of Britain (G–K)
- List of RAF aircrew in the Battle of Britain (L–N)
- List of RAF aircrew in the Battle of Britain (O–R)
- List of RAF aircrew in the Battle of Britain (V–Z)

== Bibliography ==
- Ramsay, Winston, ed. The Battle of Britain Then and Now Mk V. London: Battle of Britain Prints International Ltd, 1989. ISBN 0-900913-46-0.
- Ringlstetter, Herbert (2005). Helmut Wick, An Illustrated Biography of the Luftwaffe Ace And Commander of Jagdgeschwader 2 During The Battle of Britain. Atglen, PA: Schiffer Publishing. ISBN 0-7643-2217-6.
- Remembering the Battle of Britain
- Robert Dixon, '607 Squadron: A Shade of Blue'. The History Press 2008. ISBN 978-0-7524-4531-1
- Robert Dixon, 'A Gathering of Eagles' PublishBritannica 2004, ISBN 1-4137-3498-7
