= Archie Boyd =

British World War II flying ace

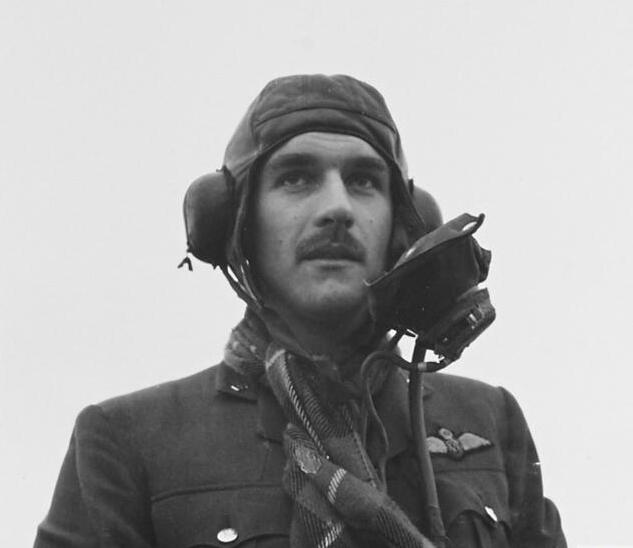
- Born: 20 June 1918; Sheffield, Yorkshire
- Died: 4 April 2014 (aged 95)
- Military career
- Allegiance: United Kingdom
- Branch: Royal Air Force
- Service years: 1939–1946
- Rank: Wing Commander
- Commands: No. 219 Squadron RAF
- Conflicts: Second World War: Battle of Britain; Channel Front; Normandy landings
- Awards: Distinguished Service Order; Distinguished Flying Cross

Wing Commander Archibald Douglas McNeill Boyd, DSO, DFC (20 June 1918 – 4 April 2014) was a Royal Air Force officer and flying ace of the Second World War, and a businessman.

== Early life ==
Boyd was born on 20 June 1918, in Sheffield, England. He was educated at Harrow School, a public boys boarding school in London. At school, he was a member of the Junior Division, Officers Training Corps, reaching the rank of sergeant. He then matriculated into Trinity College, Oxford to study engineering. While at university, he joined the Oxford University Air Squadron and learnt to fly. His studies were interrupted by the outbreak of the Second World War when he volunteered for active service.

== RAF career ==
With the outbreak of the Second World War in 1939, Boyd volunteered for active service in the Royal Air Force Volunteer Reserve. His first posting was to No. 600 Squadron RAF flying the Bristol Blenheim. He was promoted to flying officer on 18 April 1940. He flew the Bristol Beaufighter as a night fighter during the Battle of Britain in the later part of 1940. He was promoted to the war substantive rank of flight lieutenant on 18 April 1941. On the night of 16 May 1941 he brought down a Junkers Ju 88 followed by two Heinkel He 111 bombers, one on the night of 10 October and the second on the night of 2 December. He shot down a further 2 aircraft in early 1942, a Heinkel He 111 bomber on the night of 25 January and a Heinkel He 115 on the night of 7 March, thereby reaching the total of 5 aerial victories required to become a flying ace. By then he had been awarded the Distinguished Flying Cross (gazetted 9 January 1942) "in recognition of gallantry displayed in flying operations against the enemy".

He was promoted to temporary squadron leader on 1 June 1942. In March 1943, he was appointed officer commanding No. 219 Squadron RAF in preparation for an overseas posting. His promotion to squadron leader was made war substantive on 24 June 1943. That month, the squadron was posted to North Africa, where it operated from Bône in French Algeria. He scored the first victories for the squadron during that posting by shooting down two Junkers Ju 88 bombers during the night of 30 June into 1 July. He saw action over Algeria, Tunisia, Sicily and Italy, and provided air support during the Allied invasion of Italy. During August and September, he shot down one Junkers Ju 88 and two Heinkel He 111 bombers.

In January 1944, the squadron returned to England, where it was re-equipped with de Havilland Mosquito. In March 1944, by then an acting wing commander, he was awarded the Distinguished Service Order. His squadron provided air cover during the Normandy landings of June 1944. He then served in a role protecting Britain from V-1 flying bombs; he shot his first one down on 15 June. His final posting was as the air attaché to Ireland based in Dublin.

He left the military in 1946. By the end of the war he had flown 595 sorties.

== Later life ==
Following the end of the Second World War, Boyd became a civilian pilot as a test pilot for Vickers. He helped deliver Eva Peron's aircraft to Argentina, "undertaking an extraordinary flight via Iceland and Greenland, then down the east coast of the United States and across the Caribbean, before the final leg south across the Amazon". In 1961, he joined Richardsons Westgarth, an engineering company, rising to become its chairman. He retired in 1981.

== Personal life ==
In July 1940, Boyd married Ursula Steven. Together they had two sons and one daughter; Archie, John, and Corinne. His wife predeceased him, dying in 2011, and Boyd himself died on 4 April 2014, aged 95.

== Bibliography ==
- Christopher Shores and Clive Williams, Aces High, published by Grub Street, 1994. ISBN 1-898697-00-0
- Christopher Shores, Aces High, Vol.2, published by Grub Street, 1999. ISBN 1-898697-00-0
- Andrew Thomas, Beaufighter Aces of World War 2, published by Osprey, 2005. ISBN 1-84176-846-4
- Kenneth Wynn, Men of the Battle of Britain, published by Gliddon Books, 1989. ISBN 0-947893-15-6
