= Gartrell Parker =

British flying ace of WWII

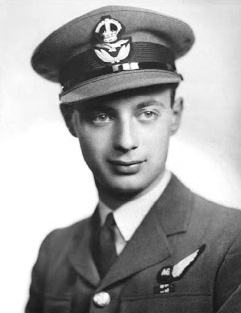
- Born: 26 November 1918; Harberton, United Kingdom
- Died: 19 February 1963 (aged 44); RAF Holme-on-Spalding Moor, United Kingdom
- Military career
- Allegiance: United Kingdom
- Branch: Royal Air Force
- Service years: 1934–1948
- Rank: Flight Lieutenant
- Nickname: 'Sailor'
- Units: No. 219 Squadron; 800 Naval Air Squadron; 830 Naval Air Squadron
- Conflicts: Second World War
- Awards: Distinguished Flying Cross & Bar; Air Force Cross; Distinguished Service Medal; Mentioned in despatches (2)
- Other work: Test pilot

Gartrell Parker, DFC & Bar, AFC, DSM (26 November 1918 – 19 February 1963) was a flying ace who served in the Royal Air Force (RAF) during the Second World War. He was credited with at least nine aerial victories.

Born in Harberton, Parker joined the RAF in 1934 and trained as a wireless operator. Prior to the Second World War he was serving on Malta and once hostilities broke out he was posted to the Fleet Air Arm's 830 Naval Air Squadron. He participated in several sorties against Italian targets, for which he received the Distinguished Service Medal and was twice mentioned in despatches. After training as a pilot in the United Kingdom and Canada, he was posted to No. 219 Squadron, which flew de Havilland Mosquito heavy fighters. During his service with the squadron he was a very successful night fighter pilot, achieving several aerial victories. After the war Parker was a test pilot, initially with the RAF and then in a civilian capacity with Blackburn Aircraft. He also flew in a number of air races in the 1950s. He was killed while testing a Blackburn Buccaneer jet fighter in February 1963.

== Early life ==
Gartrell Richard Ian Parker was born on 26 November 1918 in Harberton, a town in Devon, the United Kingdom, the son of a gamekeeper. He went to school in Totnes, attending King Edward VI Grammar School. Once his education was completed, he joined the Royal Air Force (RAF) in 1934, just before his sixteenth birthday. He qualified as a wireless operator, having undergone courses at the School of Army Co-operation at Old Sarum. After a period of service with No. 59 Squadron, in January 1938 he was posted to Malta where he served with No. 3 Anti-Aircraft Co-operation Unit before being transferred to Gibraltar. After eight months there, he returned to Malta to train as an air gunner.

== Second World War ==
Plans to return to the United Kingdom to undertake training as a pilot were put on hold following the German invasion of Poland in September 1939 which led to Britain's declaration of war. Instead, Parker was posted to a Fleet Air Arm (FAA) unit, 830 Naval Air Squadron, which operated Fairey Swordfish torpedo bombers from Hal Far.

=== Fleet Air Arm service ===
Following the entry of Italy into the war, he flew as a sergeant observer on a number of sorties in the Mediterranean, including the raid of Catania on 5 July 1940. On another sortie, carried out on 16 October 1940, his Swordfish had to ditch in the sea. He and his pilot were rescued after several hours by a Short Sunderland flying boat. Two months later, he participated in the raid on Tripoli and then, on 10 January 1941, the attack on Palermo.

Parker was transferred to another FAA unit, 800 Naval Air Squadron, which operated the Fairey Fulmar fighter on night operations to Sicily. Mentioned in despatches on 1 July 1941, a few months later Parker was granted a commission as a pilot officer. He subsequently returned to the United Kingdom for instructing duties at No. 7 Air Gunnery School at Porthcawl. At the start of 1942, Parker was awarded the Distinguished Service Medal, in recognition of his services with the FAA. He was the first RAF airman of the Second World War to receive the award. Shortly afterwards Parker was mentioned in despatches for a second time, on 20 January, for "courage, enterprise and resolution in air attacks upon the Enemy".

=== Pilot training ===
Volunteering for pilot training, Parker went to No. 22 Elementary Flying Training School at the RAF's station at Cambridge. Having informally learnt to fly during his time on Malta, he soloed after just two hours of flight training. In September 1942, he was sent to Canada for further flight training at No. 33 Elementary Flying School before going onto No. 37 Service Flying Training School at Calgary. He was promoted to flying officer on 1 October 1942.

Returning to the United Kingdom in March 1943, Parker was assigned to instructing duties. He underwent a course on twin-engined aircraft, during which it was discovered his night vision was well above average. As a consequence, he was selected for night fighting duties. Once his training was completed in March 1944, he was posted to No. 219 Squadron, by this time holding the rank of flight lieutenant. At his new unit, which was based at Honiley and was partway through converting to the de Havilland Mosquito heavy fighter, he was nicknamed 'Sailor', on account of his previous service with the FAA.

=== Service with No. 219 Squadron ===
No. 219 Squadron was tasked with night patrols and intruder missions across the English Channel and into the German-occupied Low Countries. From mid-June, it was also engaged in Operation Diver, the RAF offensive against the V-1 flying bombs being launched against southern England. On 15 June, Parker, who had been paired with Flight Sergeant Donald Godfrey as his navigator and radar operator, destroyed a V-1 and then two evenings later, claimed a Junkers Ju 188 medium bomber as probably destroyed several kilometres north of Ostend. He destroyed five more V-1s during the remainder of June.

On the night of 10 August 1944, while patrolling to the south of Le Havre, Parker and Godfrey detected and destroyed a Junkers Ju 88 medium bomber. Immediately afterwards, with the assistance of ground radar, they engaged and destroyed a Focke-Wulf Fw 190 fighter which was carrying an external long-range fuel tank. When the Fw 190 exploded, flaming fuel was dispersed across Parker's Mosquito. He briefly lost control but was able to return to England. On landing, it was discovered that much of the aircraft was badly burnt. A few nights later, again patrolling near Le Havre, Parker destroyed what was identified as a Ju 188 and damaged a second. He shot down a Junkers Ju 87 dive bomber on the evening of 28 September and destroyed a Messerschmitt Bf 110 heavy fighter near Arnhem on 6 October. The duo's recent successes saw Parker awarded the Distinguished Flying Cross (DFC) while Godfrey received the Distinguished Flying Medal. The citation for Parker's DFC was published by The London Gazette in late November and read:

Flight Lieutenant Parker has completed many operational sorties against the enemy, and has destroyed five enemy aircraft. He has also destroyed six flying bombs at night. Flight Lieutenant Parker has always shown a fine fighting spirit and the utmost keenness and courage to seek out and destroy the enemy.

— London Gazette, No. 36810, 24 November 1944

On the night of 23 December, Parker shot down a pair of Ju 188s, one near Eindhoven and the other east of Arnhem. He destroyed another pair of aircraft, this time Ju 87s, towards the end of January 1945. In March, he was awarded a Bar to his DFC while Godfrey, his navigator, received the DFC. The joint citation read:

As pilot and navigator of aircraft respectively, these officers have completed very many sorties and have consistently displayed a high degree of skill and determination. Their keenness has been outstanding and they have set an example which has impressed all. Flight Lieutenant Parker and Warrant Officer Godfrey have destroyed nine enemy aircraft at night.

— London Gazette, No. 36997, 23 March 1945

Parker ended the war credited with having definitively shot down nine German aircraft, with another deemed probably destroyed. He was also responsible for damaging one German aircraft and destroying six V-1 flying bombs.

== Later life ==
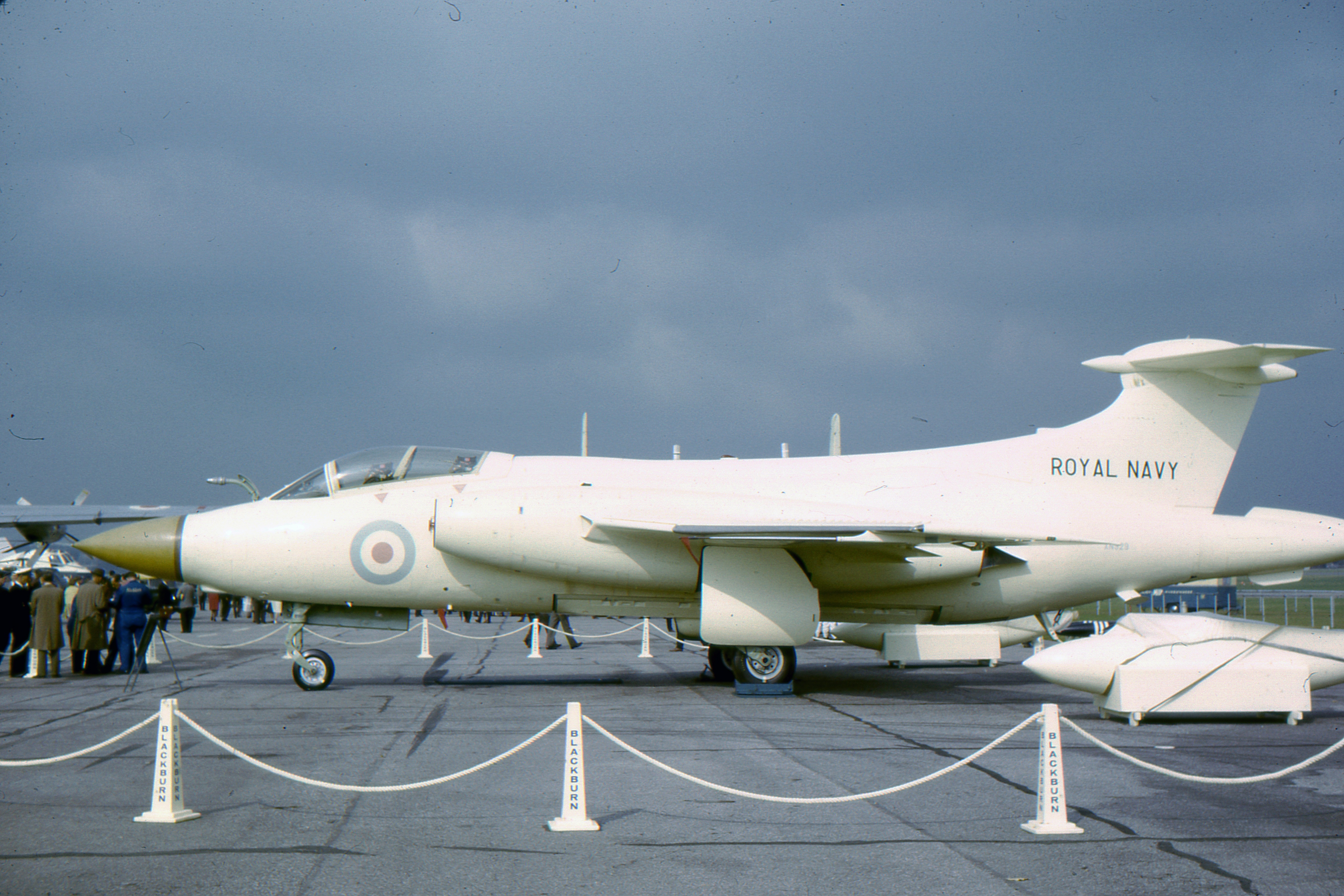
An example of the Blackburn Buccaneer, 1962

After the war, Parker was posted to the Royal Aircraft Establishment as a test pilot, a service in which he was rated as " exceptional" on two occasions. In the 1947 King's Birthday Honours, he was commended for "valuable service in the air". The following June he was awarded the Air Force Cross and shortly afterwards left the RAF.

Parker was employed by the General Aircraft company as a test pilot, remaining in the role when it merged with Blackburn Aircraft. He was also involved in air racing in the 1950s, placing highly in a number of major events including second at the 1952 King's Cup and 1953 Goodyear Trophy. During the course of his career, he flew over 200 different types of aircraft. This included the prototype for the Blackburn Buccaneer jet fighter and in October 1960, while flying it he encountered difficulty and had to eject. He and his observer were killed in an aircraft accident on 19 February 1963 while testing the production version of the Buccaneer at the RAF station at Holme-on-Spalding Moor. His medals are in the Lord Ashcroft Medal Collection.
