= Nigel Cullen =

Australian flying ace

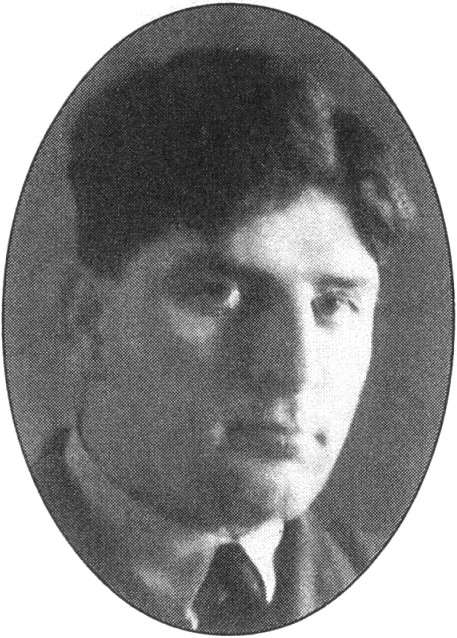
- Undated portrait of Nigel Cullen
- Born: Richard Nigel Cullen; 5 June 1917; Newcastle, New South Wales
- Died: 4 March 1941 (aged 23); Himarë, Albania
- Relatives: Paul Cullen (uncle)
- Military career
- Allegiance: Australia; United Kingdom
- Service/branch: Royal Air Force
- Service years: 1937–41
- Rank: Flight Lieutenant
- Nickname: "Ape"
- Units: No. 267 Squadron RAF (1940); No. 80 Squadron RAF (1940–41)
- Conflicts: Spanish Civil War; World War II; Mediterranean and Middle East theatre; Western Desert campaign; Battle of Greece †
- Awards: Distinguished Flying Cross

Richard Nigel Cullen, DFC (5 June 1917 – 4 March 1941) was an Australian fighter ace of World War II. Serving with the Royal Air Force (RAF), he was credited with as many as sixteen aerial victories before being killed in action during the Battle of Greece. Born in Newcastle, New South Wales, Cullen was living in London and had already seen action in the Spanish Civil War when he joined the RAF in 1937. Following the outbreak of World War II, he served initially as a transport pilot with No. 267 Squadron in the Middle East before seeking reassignment to fighters. He was then posted to No. 80 Squadron, flying Gloster Gladiator biplanes, and claimed six Axis aircraft before the unit converted to Hawker Hurricanes. Nicknamed "Ape" due to his physical bulk, Cullen was awarded the Distinguished Flying Cross for destroying five enemy aircraft in a single sortie on 28 February 1941. He was credited with another four victories in the one engagement on 3 March; the next day, he was shot down and killed while on escort duty over Albania, by a Regia Aeronautica Fiat G.50bis, at age twenty-three.

== Early career ==
Born in Newcastle, New South Wales on 5 June 1917, Nigel Cullen was the son of Horace David Cullen (originally Horace David Cohen) and his wife Hero. The boy's uncle was future Major General Paul Alfred Cullen. Nigel was taken to England at an early age by his parents and attended Sherborne School in Dorset, before studying at the College of Aero Engineering, Chelsea. Fired by a love of adventure, he competed in motorbike racing at Brooklands in 1934, and later saw action as a member of the International Brigades during the Spanish Civil War, suffering a wound to the stomach that necessitated repatriation to England. When he caught up again with his friends from Brooklands, he was reluctant to talk about the conflict except to say that "the wars of the future would be fought in the air".

Cullen was living in Putney when he joined the Royal Air Force (RAF) in 1937, and was granted a short-service commission as an acting pilot officer on 9 August. Completing his probation the following May, he was promoted to flying officer on 31 December 1939, shortly after the outbreak of World War II. Posted to the Middle East, his early wartime service was with No. 267 Squadron, a transport unit ferrying passengers and freight to and from Egypt. "Browned off" with transport duties, he sought reassignment to fighters and before long was able to effect a transfer to No. 80 Squadron, flying Gloster Gladiator biplanes, a type that was obsolescent well before the war began.

== Fighter pilot ==
=== Gladiators ===
After joining No. 80 Squadron in the Western Desert campaign, Cullen was schooled in fighter tactics by "Pat" Pattle, one of the leading British aces of the war. Nicknamed "Ape" by his colleagues due to his imposing physique, he was described by a fellow pilot as "a big, smiling, long-armed giant from Putney, with an irresistible offensive spirit and quite fearless".

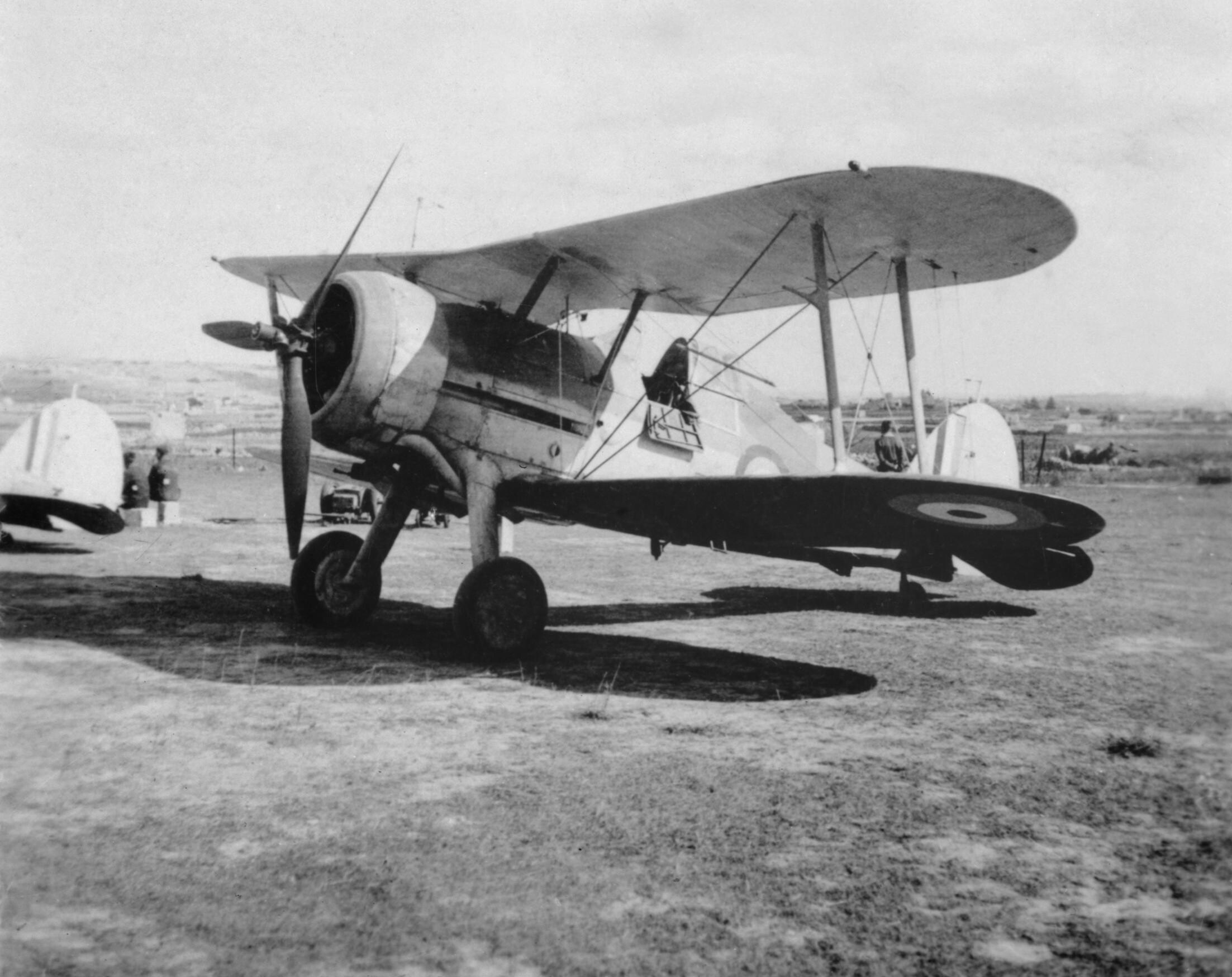
Gloster Gladiator in the Mediterranean, 1940

Cullen was "blooded" on 9 October 1940, after being detailed to search single-handedly for a missing Allied truck. Failing to locate the vehicle, he spotted five Italian Breda Ba.65 ground-attack aircraft south of Sidi Barrani and immediately engaged them, gaining credit for probably destroying one, although the Italians reported all aircraft as returning to base. No. 80 Squadron redeployed to Greece the following month, to assist in resisting the Italian invasion. There Cullen achieved his first confirmed victory, over a Savoia-Marchetti SM.81 three-engined bomber near the Kassandra Peninsula on 30 December. He was promoted to flight lieutenant the next day.

On 28 January 1941, Cullen claimed his second "kill". That day, while on an offensive patrol between Kelcyre and Premet, over Albania, with fourteen Gladiators from No. 80 Squadron, he attacked four Fiat BR.20s and five CANT Z.1007bis bombers of the Regia Aeronautica. He reported destroying a Z.1007bis but may have been firing at an aircraft that was shot down by Pattle's section. Cullen claimed a Fiat CR.42 fighter and a Savoia-Marchetti SM.79 bomber on successive days, 9 and 10 February respectively. He then recorded two victories in one mission on 20 February, over Albania. After sending a Fiat G.50 down in flames while escorting Allied bombers, he discovered two formations of CR.42s nearby and shot down one of them. Cullen later remarked, "The others made off at once. Just as well—I hadn't any ammo left." He had also been slightly wounded in the hand by a bullet.

Although the RAF claimed six Italian aircraft destroyed and two probables, including Cullen's, on 20 February, Italian sources reported only the Fiat G.50 of Tenente Alfredo Fusco of the 361^{a} Squadriglia as shot down, killing the pilot, and the G.50 of Tenente Livio Bassi of 395^{a} Squadriglia as damaged in combat and later destroyed by fire in an attempted forced landing at Berat. On 23 February, Cullen attacked a CANT Z.506 three-engined floatplane as it was taking off at Preveza in Greece, at first simply attempting to prevent it from getting airborne but then, when it refused to stop, destroying it on a second pass. The result did not add to his official score, as the Italian plane was not in full flight at the time of its destruction.

=== Hurricanes ===
By the time No. 80 Squadron began re-equipping with Hawker Hurricanes in February 1941, Cullen's total of aerial victories stood at six enemy aircraft destroyed, plus one probable. He had earned a reputation for extreme aggression and doggedness in the air. His favourite tactic was to duel head-on with his intended victim, two aircraft firing at each other with a closing speed of over 500 miles per hour (800 km/h); he was quoted as saying, "It's always interesting to see who will pull away first". His colleagues reportedly said of him, "He never came out of a fight while a single enemy aircraft was left in the sky to give battle. He came home only when his guns were empty." Cullen opened his score in the Hurricane on 27 February, shooting down a Fiat CR.42 while escorting Bristol Blenheim light bombers to Valona, Albania. The day after, in what has been described as "the greatest air battle of this period", he was officially credited with shooting down five Italian planes in the one engagement, a record for his unit. His combat report read:

The battle extended right across Albania. First, I found four Breda 20s. I got one, which went down in flames. There we found three formations of SM.79s. I took on one and aimed at the starboard engine. It caught fire and crashed in flames. I climbed and dived on the next. He too crashed in flames. Then we attacked ten CR.42s, climbing to get above them. I got behind one, and he caught fire and went down in flames. Up again immediately – dived, fired into the cockpit and another one took fire, rolled over and crashed. I had to come home then – no more ammo.

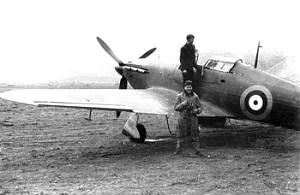
Flight Lieutenant Cullen beside his Hawker Hurricane of No. 80 Squadron RAF at Paramythia, Greece, just before taking off on his final sortie, 4 March 1941

For his achievements on 28 February, the RAF's most successful day of the campaign, Cullen was awarded the Distinguished Flying Cross (DFC). Italian sources recorded that a Savoia-Marchetti SM.79 was only damaged on 28 February, not shot down, and that the Breda 20s claimed by the RAF were in fact Fiat BR.20s. Cullen claimed another multiple kill on 3 March, when he and one of his comrades chased a group of CANT Z.1007bis that had just bombed Larissa, Greece. Catching the retreating bombers south-west of Corfu, No. 80 Squadron claimed six destroyed and one probable. Cullen was credited with destroying four CANTs and probably destroying another, though the Italians reported that only two CANT bombers were lost.

The following day, 4 March, flying Hurricane V7288, Cullen was escorting a group of Blenheims near Himarë in southern Albania. Once the Blenheims had bombed their target (five Italian warships) and were on their return flight, Flight Lieutenant Pattle ordered the Hurricanes to hunt in pairs over the warships, where several Italian fighters were seen. At once a lone G.50bis attacked Pattle and his wingman, on this occasion Cullen. Pattle reported shooting down the Fiat and watching it spiral into a mountainside, but at this moment a second Fiat jumped Cullen's Hurricane and he was not seen again. His aircraft crashed near Himarë, and the Australian was killed; he was twenty-three years old. The citation for his DFC was promulgated in the London Gazette on 14 March:

In February, 1941, this officer was pilot of one of a formation of aircraft which attacked a large force of enemy bombers escorted by at least 30 fighters. Displaying remarkable skill, Flight Lieutenant Cullen shot down five of the enemy's aircraft in the ensuing action. He has now destroyed 11 enemy aircraft and has consistently shown great resource and courage. (It was assumed at the time of this dispatch that Cullen was missing in action, as reported by Pattle.)

Although the Australian official history puts the number of Cullen's victories at thirteen, his total score is more commonly estimated as sixteen, or sixteen-and-a-half. He is buried in Tirana Park Memorial Cemetery, Tirana, Albania. His name appears on the Commemorative Roll at the Australian War Memorial, Canberra.
