= No. 80 Squadron RAF =

British flying squadron

- Active: 1 Sept 1917 – 1 April 1918 (RFC); 1 April 1918 – 1 February 1920 (RAF); 8 March 1937 – 1 May 1955; 1 August 1955 – 28 September 1969; 15 April 2024 – present
- Country: United Kingdom
- Branch: Royal Air Force
- Part of: Air and Space Warfare Centre
- Home station: Eglin AFB, Florida
- Nickname: Weighty Eighty
- Motto: "Strike True"
- Battle honours: Lys; Western Front, 1918*; Marne, 1918; Somme, 1918*; Egypt & Libya, 1940–43*; Greece, 1940–41*; Syria 1941; El Alamein*: Mediterranean, 1940–43; Italy, 1944*; South-East Europe, 1944; Normandy, 1944*; Home Defence 1944; Fortress Europe, 1944; France & Germany, 1944–45*; Arnhem; Rhine; Honours marked with an asterisk* are emblazoned on the Squadron Standard

Insignia
- Squadron Badge heraldry: A bell The badge commemorates one of the squadron's early commanders, Maj. V.D. Bell
- Squadron Codes: GK (Oct 1938 – May 1939, 1940 – Jun 1940); OD (May 1939 – 1940); YK (Jun 1940 – Jan 1941); EY (Jul 1942 – Apr 1944); W2 (Apr 1944 – 1952)
- Squadron Roundel

Number 80 Squadron is a squadron of the Royal Air Force. It was reformed on 15 April 2024 at Eglin Air Force Base, Florida, after the numberplate was awarded to the British team at the Australia, Canada and United Kingdom Reprogramming Laboratory (ACURL). It was a Royal Flying Corps (RFC) and Royal Air Force (RAF) squadron active from 1917 until 1969. It was operative during both the First and Second World Wars.

== History ==
=== Establishment and early service ===
Founded on 1 August 1917 at Montrose Air Station, Scotland, equipped with the Sopwith Camel and intended as a fighter squadron, 80 Squadron was sent to France to serve on the Western Front in January 1918, acting initially in a fighter role. However, German offensives in March of the same year resulted in 80 Sqn being reallocated in a ground-attack role, still with Camels. It continued this duty until the end of the war. As a result, the squadron had only one ace, Harold Whistler, although it claimed approximately 60 aerial victories.

The Camels were replaced with Sopwith Snipes in December 1918 and in May the following year the squadron moved to Egypt, where it served for a short period of time before being amalgamated into No. 56 Squadron RAF.

=== Reinstatement and the Second World War ===
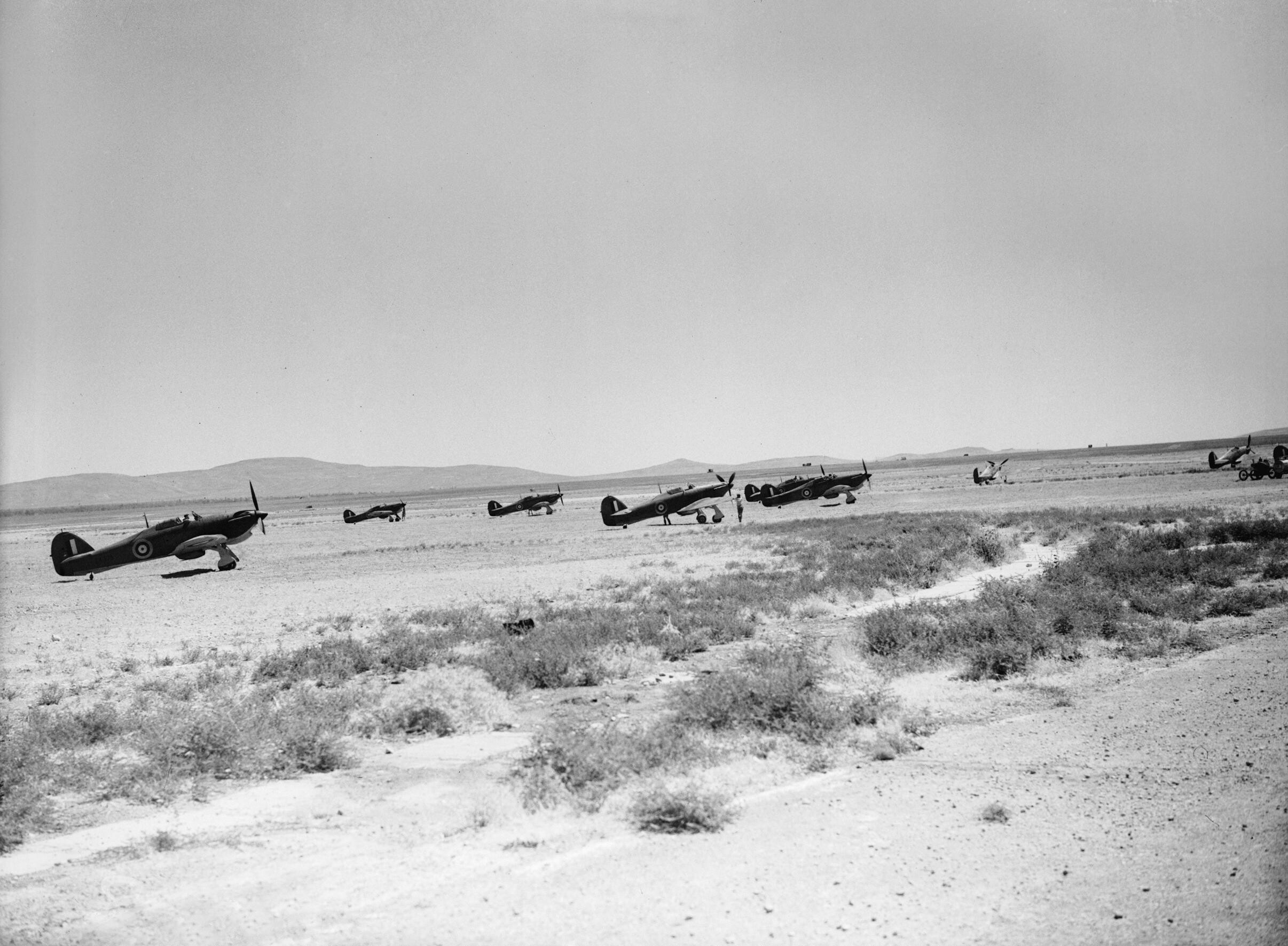
Hurricanes of 80 Squadron in Palestine, June 1941

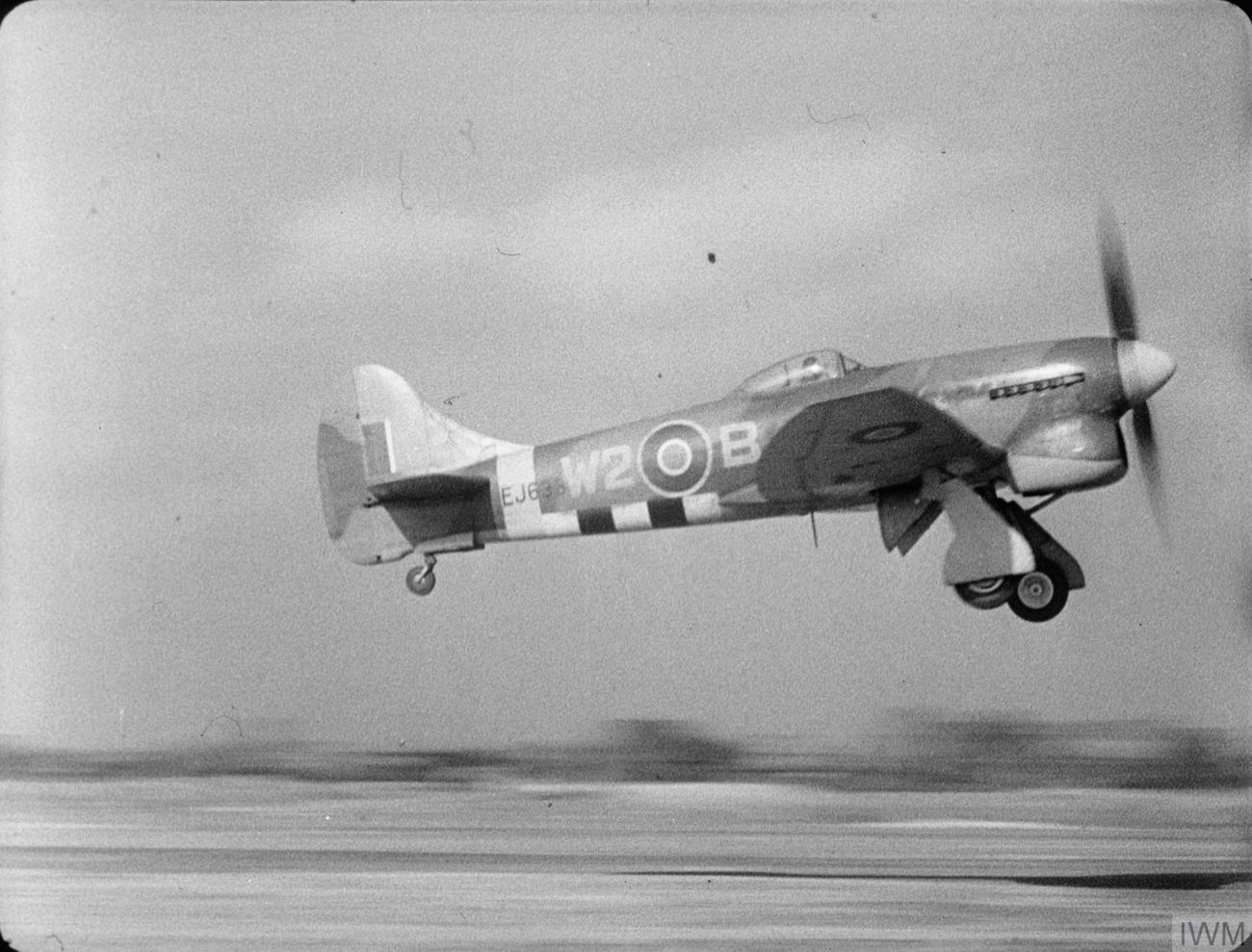
Hawker Tempest Mark V, 'W2-B', of 80 Squadron, at ALG B80/Volkel, Holland.

The squadron was reformed in March 1937 again as No. 80 Squadron, now equipped with Gloster Gauntlet fighter. However, by now the Gauntlet was considered by many to be outdated, and as a result the Gauntlets were replaced by the Gloster Gladiator just two months later. In 1938, the squadron again returned to Egypt as an 'air defence unit'. After Italy's declaration of war on Britain on 10 June 1940, No. 80 Squadron was moved to the Egyptian-Libyan border but was subsequently one of the units sent to aid the Greeks during the Greco-Italian War, initially flying Gladiators and then re-equipping with the Hawker Hurricane from February 1941. The squadron lost most of its aircraft during the Greek and Crete actions and reformed at RAF Aqir in Palestine in May 1941 before deploying detachments to Nicosia in Cyprus and 'A' Flight to RAF Haifa. The squadron moved totally to Cyprus in July 1941, before returning to Syria the next month, and then joining the fighting in North Africa two months later. During the Battle of El Alamein it was responsible for defending communications lines. It remained in that area until early 1944, when it returned to Britain to prepare for Operation Overlord (the Allied invasion of Europe). It was equipped with the Supermarine Spitfire Mk IX operating from RAF Detling as part of Air Defence of Great Britain Command (ADGB), though under the operational control of RAF Second Tactical Air Force (2nd TAF). When 2nd TAF began moving to Normandy after D-Day, the squadron remained in ADGB, re-equipping with Hawker Tempest aircraft on anti-V-1 flying bomb duties as part of Operation Diver. After this threat diminished, No. 80 Squadron moved on to the continent and resumed a fighter role until the end of the war in Europe.

=== Post-Second World War and disbandment ===
As part of the occupation forces, 2TAF aka British Air Forces of Occupation, the squadron continued its patrol and reconnaissance duties from RAF Wunstorf in Germany, until it relocated to Hong Kong in July 1949 (the Tempests having been replaced by Supermarine Spitfire F.24s in 1948). During the Chinese Civil War, No. 80 Squadron's main duty was to defend Hong Kong from perceived Communist threats. The Spitfires departed in 1951, replaced by the de Havilland Hornet, and the squadron remained in Hong Kong until being disbanded on 1 May 1955. However, two months later it was reformed as a reconnaissance unit at RAF Laarbruch. Equipped with English Electric Canberra PR.7s, it moved to RAF Bruggen in June 1957 from then until 28 September 1969, when it was disbanded.

=== Air & Space Warfare Centre ===
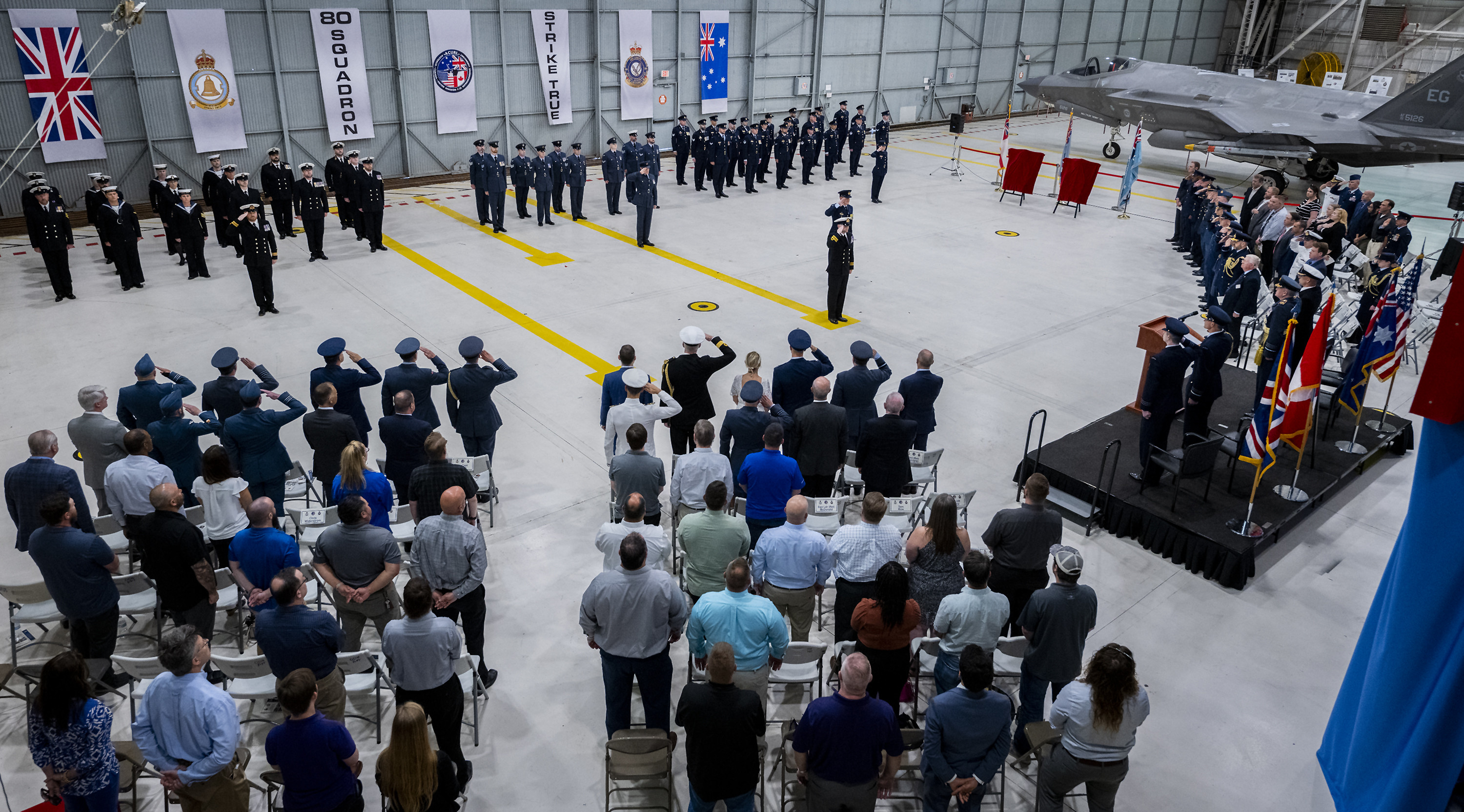
Royal Navy, RAF and Royal Australian Air Force personnel salute during the No. 80 Squadron reformation ceremony at Eglin Air Force Base

On 15 April 2024, No. 80 Squadron was reformed, alongside No. 80 Squadron of the Royal Australian Air Force, in a ceremony at Eglin Air Force Base, Florida, as an Air & Space Warfare Centre Squadron.

== Notable members ==
- David Coke
- Nigel Cullen
- Roald Dahl
- William Vale
- Pat Pattle
- Tap Jones
- John Urwin-Mann

== Aircraft operated ==
From	To	Aircraft	Version
Aug 1917	Dec 1918	Sopwith Camel	
Dec 1918	Feb 1920	Sopwith Snipe	
Mar 1937	Mar 1937	Gloster Gauntlet	Mk.II
Mar 1937	Nov 1940	Gloster Gladiator	Mk.I
Jun 1940	Aug 1940	Hawker Hurricane	Mk.I
Nov 1940	Mar 1941	Gloster Gladiator	Mk.II
Feb 1941	Jan 1942	Hawker Hurricane	Mk.I
Jan 1942	Apr 1943	Hawker Hurricane	Mk.IIc
Apr 1943	Apr 1944	Supermarine Spitfire	Mk.Vc
Sep 1943	Jan 1944	Supermarine Spitfire	Mk.IX
Jan 1944	Apr 1944	Supermarine Spitfire	Mk.Vb
May 1944	Aug 1944	Supermarine Spitfire	Mk.IX
Aug 1944	Jan 1948	Hawker Tempest	Mk.V
Jan 1948	Jan 1952	Supermarine Spitfire	F.24
Dec 1951	May 1955	de Havilland Hornet	F.3 & F.4
Aug 1955	Sep 1969	English Electric Canberra	PR.7

== See also ==
- Cathay Pacific VR-HEU
