= No. 219 Squadron RAF =

No. 219 (Mysore) Squadron RAF
- Active: August 1918 – 7 February 1919; 4 October 1939 – 1 September 1946; 1 March 1951 – 1 September 1954; 5 September 1955 – 31 July 1957
- Country: United Kingdom
- Branch: Royal Air Force
- Nickname: Mysore
- Motto: From dusk till dawn
- Battle honours: Battle of Britain

Insignia
- Squadron Badge: A Death's head Hawk Moth
- Squadron code: FK
- 1950s squadron roundel

No. 219 Squadron of the Royal Air Force was founded in 1918 and disbanded in 1957 after four separate periods of service. During the First World War it served as a coastal defence unit, and through most of the Second World War and the 1950s it operated as a night fighter air defence squadron. Three commanders of the squadron went on to be Chiefs of the Air Staff, two of the RAF and one of the Royal Pakistani Air Force.

== First World War ==
The squadron was formed in August 1918, by merging No. 442, 555, 556 and 470 Flights. It operated a mixture of aircraft, including seaplanes, Airco DH.9 bombers, and Sopwith Camel fighters, and was responsible for the defence of the Thames Estuary. It was disbanded in early 1920, following the end of the war.

== Second World War ==
It reformed in October 1939, shortly after the outbreak of the Second World War, operating Bristol Blenheims from RAF Catterick. Whilst it was intended to carry out shipping protection missions, it began to be used as a night fighter unit after becoming fully operational in February 1940; in October, it was moved to RAF Redhill, near London, and converted to the Bristol Beaufighter. In December, it moved to RAF Tangmere in Sussex, continuing in its operational role.

It moved back to north England in mid 1942, to RAF Acklington and later RAF Scorton; in May 1943, the squadron was transferred to North Africa, where it was dispersed between various ports to provide night fighter defence. In September 1943 it operated a number of aircraft from Sicily, but moved back to the UK in January 1944 to join the newly forming Second Tactical Air Force in preparation for the invasion of Normandy. It re-equipped with de Havilland Mosquito night fighters, first Mk. 17 and later Mk. 30 models, and flew intruder missions over north-western Europe from RAF Woodvale, RAF Honiley, RAF Bradwell Bay and RAF Hunsdon. It moved to bases in France in October 1944, returning to the UK after the end of hostilities in August 1945, and was disbanded in September 1946.

== Cold War ==
The squadron reformed in March 1951 at RAF Kabrit in the Suez Canal Zone, again as a night fighter squadron operating Mosquitoes. In October 1952 it received its first Gloster Meteor jet fighters, and was fully re-equipped with Meteors by April 1953. The squadron disbanded in September 1954, but was reformed again in September 1955 at RAF Driffield, with de Havilland Venom NF.2. After two further years of operating in this role, it was disbanded for the fourth time in mid-1957.

== Notable members ==
Notable members of the unit included:

- Richard Atcherley, later Chief of the Air Staff of the Royal Pakistani Air Force, who commanded the squadron on its formation in 1939.
- Archie Boyd, DSO, DFC. Commanded the squadron in 1943 and was a flying ace with 10 aerial victories.
- John Grandy, later Chief of the Air Staff, who briefly commanded the squadron in 1940.
- Arthur Hodgkinson, DSO, DFC & Bar. He was officially credited with 12 aircraft destroyed, at least eight of which were shot down whilst serving with the squadron.
- Gartrell Parker, DFC and Bar. He was credited with nine German aircraft destroyed, all of which were claimed while serving with the squadron
- Thomas Pike, later Chief of the Air Staff, who commanded the squadron in 1941.
- John Topham, DFC and Bar. He was officially credited with 13 German bombers destroyed, at least five of which were shot down whilst serving with the squadron.
- Peter Williamson, DFC and Bar. He was officially credited with nine German aircraft destroyed, at least four of which were shot down whilst serving with the squadron.
- Douglas Alfred Oxby, DSO, DFC, DFM and Bar. 'Douggie' Oxby was a night fighter Nav/Rad (1941-45). He was involved in the destruction of 13 enemy aircraft whilst flying Bristol Beaufighters with 68 & 89 squadrons in North Africa & Malta. Following a 'rest' period as a NF instructor (1943) in early 1944 he was posted to 219 at Bradwell Bay & crewed with the squadron's CO W/Cdr Peter Wilfrith Green DFC. 219 had only recently converted from Beaufighters to Mk XXX NF Mosquitoes & Oxby/Green used their 'new tools' to great effect becoming one of the most successful night fighter crews of 2 TAF over NW Europe. By the wars end Oxby had assisted in the destruction of 22 e/a & had earned four gallantry medals. This was quite an achievement for a young solicitor's clerk from Canton Cardiff who had originally enlisted in the RAF in 1941 aged 20, as a lowly AC2 aircraftsman. At 25 he held the rank of Wing Commander & was the highest-scoring Allied night fighter navigator of the Second World War.

== Bibliography ==
- Roba, Jean-Louis (October 2001). "Les Mosquito du 219 Squadron en France" [The Mosquitoes of 219 Squadron in France]. Avions: Toute l'Aéronautique et son histoire (in French) (103): 33–39. ISSN 1243-8650.
- Shores, Christopher; Williams, Clive (1994). Aces High: A Tribute to the Most Notable Fighter Pilots of the British and Commonwealth Forces in WWII. London: Grub Street. ISBN 1-8-9869-7000.
