= Kenneth Tait =

New Zealand flying ace (1918–1941)

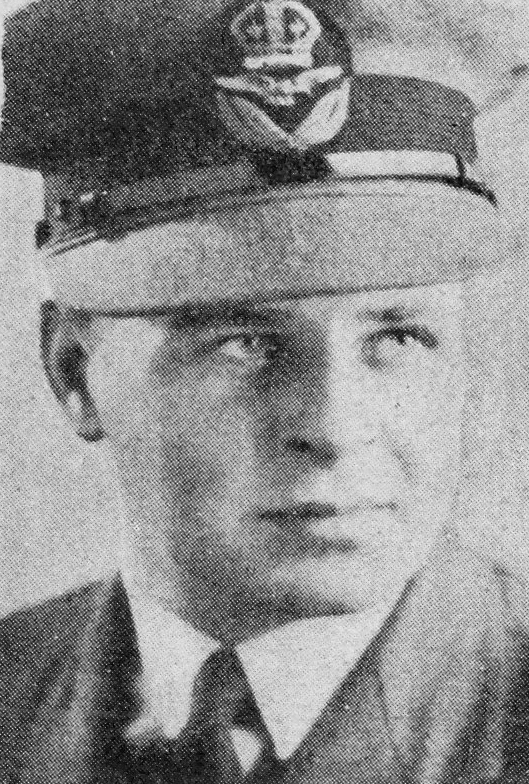
- Born: 19 November 1918; Wellington, New Zealand
- Died: 4 August 1941 (aged 22)
- Military career
- Allegiance: New Zealand
- Branch: Royal Air Force
- Service years: 1937–1941 (MIA)
- Rank: Flight Lieutenant
- Units: No. 87 Squadron; No. 257 Squadron
- Conflicts: Second World War; Battle of France; Battle of Britain
- Awards: Distinguished Flying Cross; Mention in Despatches

Kenneth William Tait, DFC (19 November 1918 – 4 August 1941) was a New Zealand flying ace of the Royal Air Force (RAF) during the Second World War. He is credited with destroying five enemy aircraft, a share in another aircraft destroyed and eight damaged.

Born in Wellington, Tait joined the RAF in 1937. After completing flight training he was posted to No. 87 Squadron. Sent to France shortly after the outbreak of the Second World War, he shot down at least three enemy aircraft once the Germans invaded the Low Countries in May 1940. He destroyed another three enemy aircraft during the Battle of Britain. He was subsequently awarded the Distinguished Flying Cross and this was followed by a mention in despatches. After a period of instructing duties, in July 1941 he was posted to No. 257 Squadron and went missing in action the following month.

== Early life ==
Born on 19 November 1918 in Wellington, New Zealand, Kenneth William Tait was the son of William John and his wife Helen Tait. He was educated at Rongotai College and the Wellington College, where he played in the school's senior rugby team. After completing his schooling, he studied bookkeeping at the local technical college and was employed as a clerk.

In May 1937 Tait was accepted for a short service commission in the Royal Air Force (RAF). He left for England later that year, one of twelve New Zealanders intending to join the RAF as pilots, sailing aboard the RMS Rangitata and commenced flight training in October at a civilian school in White Waltham. On completion of his elementary course in January 1938, he was commissioned as an acting pilot officer in the RAF. He proceeded to No. 6 Flying Training School at Little Rissington, gained his wings in May and then three months later was posted to No. 87 Squadron. At the time he joined the squadron, it was in the process of converting to the Hawker Hurricane fighter.

== Second World War ==
In August 1939, as tensions escalated between Britain and Germany, No. 87 Squadron was mobilised for war. It was intended to send the squadron to France as the Air Component of the British Expeditionary Force (BEF), designated as part of No. 60 Mobile Wing. Following the invasion of Poland and with the Second World War now underway, it deployed to France. Tait worked as the squadron's adjutant until November, at which time he commenced flying duties although it was a relatively quiet time, with little action seen. In April 1940, while flying in fog over the Maginot Line, he crashed his Hurricane. He spent two weeks in hospital with his injuries and was still convalescing at the squadron's airfield when it was attacked by Luftwaffe bombers, his tent being torn by shrapnel.

=== Battle of France ===
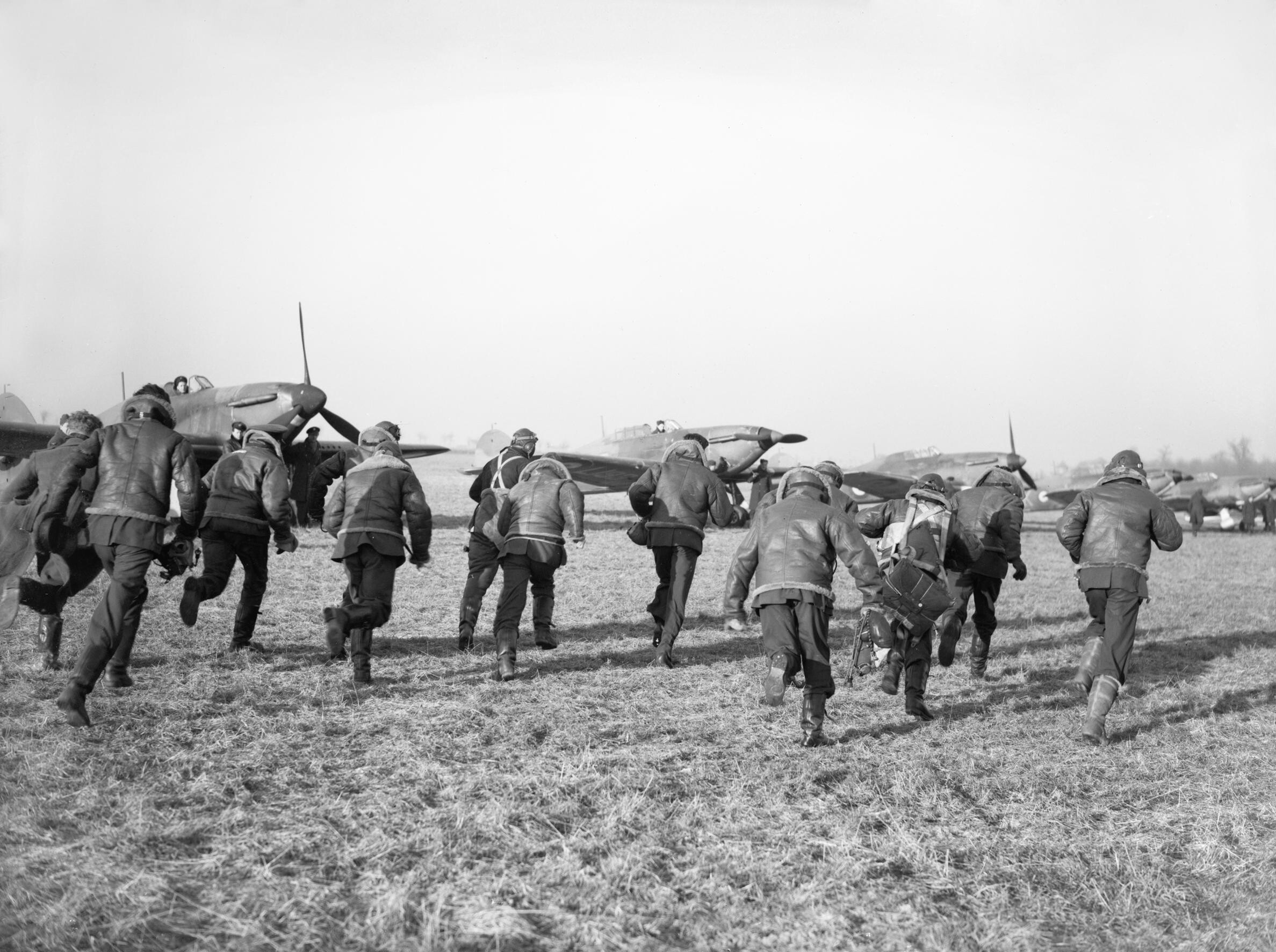
Pilots of No. 87 Squadron running for their Hawker Hurricanes while at Lille-Seclin airfield in France

By the time of the invasion of the Low Countries in May, Tait was back on operations. He damaged a Heinkel He 111 medium bomber on 12 May and three days later destroyed a Messerschmitt Bf 110 heavy fighter. He was credited with a damaged Junkers Ju 87 dive bomber on 18 May. He had a particularly busy day on 20 May; he shot down a Messerschmitt Bf 109 fighter, damaged two more Bf 109s, had a share in a destroyed Junkers Ju 88 medium bomber with future flying ace Ian Gleed, and damaged two other Ju 88s. With the situation in France deteriorating, the squadron was withdrawn to England on 22 May. Tait, having lost most of his personal kit, flew a Dutch aircraft to the RAF station at Debden.

=== Battle of Britain ===
On its return to England, No. 87 Squadron was based at Filton as part of No. 10 Group. It saw little action in the early stages of the Battle of Britain as it was rebuilt following its losses in France and during this time, Tait was promoted to flying officer. Now under the command of Squadron Leader Terrence Lovell-Gregg, a fellow New Zealander, the squadron was one of several scrambled in the afternoon of 15 August to intercept a large raid mounted on Portland by around 30 Ju 87s with a fighter escort numbering 100 aircraft. Tait destroyed a Bf 110 and damaged two others. Lovell-Gregg was killed during the engagement and Tait formed part of the burial party for the interment at Warmwell. He destroyed two German aircraft to the west of Portland on 25 August, a Bf 110 and Bf 109.

Early in December 1940, Tait was taken off operational duties and sent to No. 56 Operational Training Unit as an instructor. In February the following year, he was awarded the Distinguished Flying Cross. The next month, he was mentioned in despatches. Promoted to flight lieutenant in May 1941, Tait returned to operational flying in July. He was posted to No. 257 Squadron, which operated from Coltishall and carried out patrols and reconnaissance flights over the North Sea. On 4 August, he failed to return from a sortie attacking E-boats. Initially reported as missing in action, he was subsequently presumed to have been shot down and killed.

Tait is commemorated on the Commonwealth War Graves Commission's Air Forces Memorial near Egham in Surrey, England. He is credited with the confirmed destruction of five German aircraft, a share in another destroyed and eight damaged.
