= Wilfred Sizer =

British flying ace of WWII

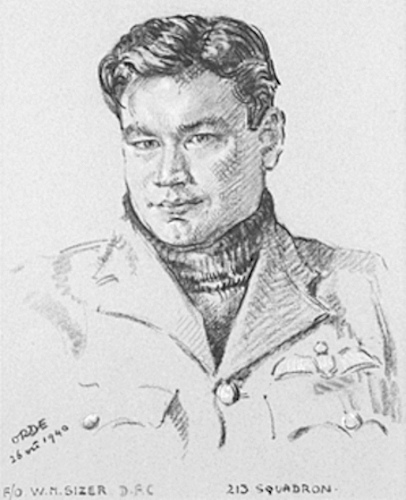
- Portrait of Sizer, made by Cuthbert Orde in 1940
- Born: 23 February 1920; Chelmsford, England
- Died: 22 December 2006 (aged 86)
- Military career
- Allegiance: United Kingdom
- Branch: Royal Air Force
- Service years: 1938–1946; 1948–1963
- Rank: Wing commander
- Commands: No. 93 Squadron; No. 680 PRU; No. 54 Squadron
- Conflicts: Second World War: Battle of France; Battle of Britain; Circus offensive; Tunisian campaign; Invasion of Sicily
- Awards: Distinguished Flying Cross & Bar

Wilfred Sizer, DFC & Bar (23 February 1920 – 22 December 2006) was a British flying ace who served in the Royal Air Force (RAF) during the Second World War. He is credited with having shot down twelve aircraft.

Born in Chelmsford, Sizer joined the RAF in 1938 and was serving with No. 213 Squadron at the time of the outbreak of the Second World War. He flew extensively in the Battle of France and the subsequent Battle of Britain, claiming a number of aerial victories. He commanded No. 93 Squadron during the final months of the Tunisian campaign and during the invasion of Sicily. He left the RAF in 1946 but after briefly working as a charter pilot, he rejoined the service. His postwar career in the RAF included a period as commander of No. 54 Squadron. After his retirement from the military in 1963, he worked for an avionics company in the Middle East. He spent his final years in England and died in 2006, aged 86.

== Early life ==
Wilfred Max Sizer was born on 23 February 1920 at Chelmsford, in England. He was educated locally, at King Edward VI Grammar School. In early 1938, he joined the Royal Air Force (RAF) on a short service commission, commencing his flying training shortly afterwards. At the end of the year, he was posted to No. 17 Squadron which operated Gloster Gauntlet fighters from Kenley. He served with this unit for six months, at which time he was transferred to No. 213 Squadron.

== Second World War ==
At the time of the outbreak of the Second World War, No. 213 Squadron was based at the RAF station at Wittering and operated Hawker Hurricane fighters. It was tasked with carrying out patrols along the east coast of England.

=== Battle of France ===
A week after the invasion of France on 10 May 1940, No. 213 Squadron was sent to Merville to reinforce the RAF presence there. It was immediately called upon for defensive patrolling and bomber escort duties. The same day or the next, he damaged a Henschel Hs 126 reconnaissance aircraft. On 19 May he shared in the destruction of two more Hs 126s in the Lille area. The next day, he shared in the shooting down of a Dornier Do 17 medium bomber near Tournai. On 21 May, Sizer, making his final patrol before the squadron returned to England later in the day, was shot down by a Messerschmitt Bf 109 fighter, crash-landeding his Hurricane near De Panne. He received facial wounds as a result but was able to make his way to a first aid station for treatment. He secured travel to England the same day and after only two days rejoined his squadron.

On its return to England, one of No. 213 Squadron's flights was based at Manston and making cross-channel flights to operate over the French coast. Towards the end of the month the squadron helped provide aerial cover over the beaches at Dunkirk during the evacuation of the British Expeditionary Force (BEF). Sizer destroyed a Bf 109 over Dunkirk on 28 May. The next day, he damaged a Heinkel He 111 medium bomber that was bombing the evacuation beaches. He shot down one Bf 109 and damaged a second on the last day of the month, but his Hurricane was set afire by another Bf 109 and he crash-landed near Dunkirk. He made his way back to England aboard Plynlimon, a Clyde paddle steamer, and rejoined his squadron, having been reported missing in action in the interim.

=== Battle of Britain ===
Once the evacuation of the BEF was completed, No. 213 Squadron was briefly based at Biggin Hill before it shifted to Exeter in Devon, as part of No. 10 Group, in late June and served from here throughout the Battle of Britain on interception duties along the English Channel. Sizer destroyed a Junkers Ju 88 medium bomber over the Isle of Portland on 11 August, and this was followed the next day by his destruction of a Messerschmitt Bf 110 heavy fighter near Bognor. On 15 August, No. 213 Squadron and two other squadrons were scrambled to intercept a large group of Junkers Ju 87 dive bombers escorted by Bf 109s and Bf 110s. Originally headed for the RAF station at Warmwell, the German formation had been diverted to Portland after encountering several RAF fighters on the way. Sizer shot down a pair of Ju 87s over the isle.

Although No. 213 Squadron remained active during the remainder of the Battle of Britain, Sizer claimed only one further aerial victory in the campaign; a Ju 88 destroyed near Beachy Head that was shared with a pilot of No. 253 Squadron on 5 October. By this time, he was a flying officer, having been promoted to this rank in September. The next month Sizer was recognised for his successes with an award of a Distinguished Flying Cross (DFC). This was gazetted on 8 November and the published citation read:

During a period of five days in France, this officer destroyed one enemy aircraft and shared in the destruction of four others. Since the return of the squadron to this country, Flying Officer Sizer has taken part in a large number of patrols and has personally destroyed at least a further six enemy aircraft. During one patrol he was attacked and shot down by five Messerschmitts. Landing two miles outside La Panne, he swam across a canal and was taken to a casualty station suffering from facial wounds, and thence to England. After only two days sick leave he again participated in patrols with his squadron.

— London Gazette, No. 34987, 8 November 1940

=== Later war service ===
At the end of the year, Sizer was posted to No. 55 Operational Training Unit (OTU) as an instructor. In April 1941, he returned to front-line service with a transfer to No. 1 Squadron, where he was a flight commander. At the time, the squadron was working towards being operational on night fighter duties while also carrying out offensive sorties with its Hurricanes to German-occupied Europe. In the middle of the year he was shifted to No. 91 Squadron, a Supermarine Spitfire fighter squadron at Hawkinge. His service here was brief, for within a matter of weeks he was assigned to No. 1 Photographic Reconnaissance Unit (PRU). This was another short-term posting as in August he returned to instructing duties at No. 57 OTU at Hawarden. By this time he was a flight lieutenant, having been promoted in September 1941.

In April 1942, Sizer was posted to No. 152 Squadron as a flight commander. The squadron was based at Eglinton, flying patrols over the Irish Sea and sorties to the northwest of France with its Spitfires. On 25 August he shared in the destruction of a Ju 88 to the north of Ireland. Later in the year, the squadron moved to North Africa to support the Allied operations in Tunisia. Based at Souk-el-Arba, it flew bomber escort missions and offensive patrols to Tunis. On 23 November, not long after its arrival in Tunisia, Sizer damaged a Macchi C.202 fighter near Tunis. He damaged a Ju 88 on 28 December.

Sizer was given command of his own unit, No. 93 Squadron, in January 1943. Like his previous unit, his command was engaged in the Tunisian campaign, flying Spitfires from Souk-el-Khemis Airfield on fighter sweeps, bomber escort duties and Rhubarb missions. Once the fighting in North Africa ended, No. 93 Squadron shifted to Malta, flying from Hal Far in support of the Allied invasion of Sicily as part of No. 324 Wing. It flew patrols over the landing beaches during the Allied invasion of the island.

Sizer damaged a Ju 88 on 10 July and damaged a Bf 109 two days later. Returning to Malta after the latter engagement, he had to crash-land his Spitfire due to a failure in the undercarriage. On 13 July he shot down a MC.202, probably destroyed a second and damaged four others, all over Augusta in Sicily. He relinquished command of the squadron in August to return to instructing duties at No. 71 OTU in Ismailia. He was awarded a Bar to his DFC the following month.

Made a temporary squadron leader at the start of 1944, Sizer's rank was made substantive a few months. The final months of his war service was spent as commander of No. 680 PRU, based at Deversoir. He left the RAF in 1946, holding the rank of wing commander.

== Later life ==
On his return to civilian life, Sizer started working as a charter pilot. However, after two years, he rejoined the RAF as a squadron leader. He initially served as an instructor at the Central Flying School and then in late 1953 was appointed commander of No. 54 Squadron at Odiham, which operated the Gloster Meteor jet fighter. He oversaw its subsequent conversion to the Hawker Hunter jet fighter two years later, relinquishing his command in January 1956. He later served in a staff role at the Air Ministry and also spent a period of time in Hong Kong. Having attained the rank of acting wing commander, he retired from the RAF in February 1963.

Sizer worked in the private sector, for Marconi Radar in the Middle East, for several years until his retirement in 1985. He spent his final years living on the outskirts of Chelmsford. He died on 22 December 2006, survived by his wife Nita, who he had married in 1942, and the couple's three sons. A portrait of Sizer, executed in October 1940 by the official war artist Cuthbert Orde, is held by the Royal Air Force Museum.

Sizer is credited with having shot down twelve aircraft, five being shared with other pilots. He also claimed one aircraft as probably destroyed and ten damaged.
