= John Urwin-Mann =

Canadian flying ace of WWII

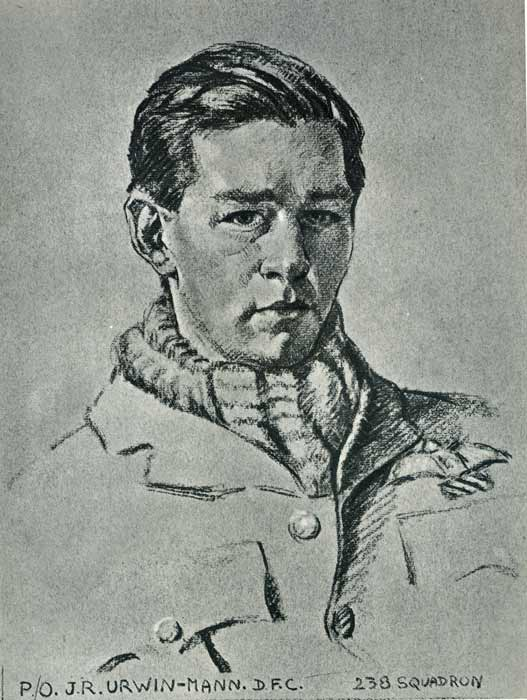
- Portrait of Urwin-Mann, drawn by Cuthbert Orde in 1940
- Born: 20 July 1920; Victoria, British Columbia, Canada
- Died: 7 March 1999 (aged 78); England
- Military career
- Allegiance: United Kingdom
- Branch: Royal Air Force
- Service years: 1939–1959
- Rank: Squadron Leader
- Nickname: 'Jack'
- Commands: No. 126 Squadron; No. 80 Squadron
- Conflicts: Second World War: Battle of Britain; Western Desert campaign; Siege of Malta
- Awards: Distinguished Service Order; Distinguished Flying Cross & Bar

John Urwin-Mann, DSO, DFC & Bar (20 July 1920 – 7 March 1999) was a Canadian flying ace who served in the Royal Air Force (RAF) during the Second World War. During his service with the RAF, he was credited with having shot down at least eight aircraft.

Born in Victoria in British Columbia, Urwin-Mann joined the RAF in 1939 and the following year was posted to No. 253 Squadron, flying Hawker Hurricane fighters. He flew with this unit prior to and during the early days of the Battle of France in May 1940 before being transferred to No. 238 Squadron. He flew throughout the Battle of Britain, during which he claimed the majority of his aerial victories and was awarded the Distinguished Flying Cross (DFC). Sent to the Middle East in 1941, he took command of No. 80 Squadron early the following year and then, in October 1942, moved to Malta where he led No. 126 Squadron. Subsequently, awarded a bar to his DFC, and then the Distinguished Service Order, he spent the final years of the war in a staff and training role. He remained in the RAF in the postwar period until 1959, when he retired with the rank of squadron leader. Settling in England, he died in 1999, aged 78.

== Early life ==
John Ronald Urwin-Mann, known as Jack, was born on 20 July 1920 in Victoria, the capital of British Columbia, Canada. His parents were originally from the United Kingdom and in 1922, they relocated with Urwin-Mann to England, settling in Hove, East Sussex. Educated at Xavier College in Brighton, he joined the Royal Air Force (RAF) in March 1939. His training commenced at No. 15 Elementary & Reserve Flying Training School at Redhill, and he was granted a short service commission as an acting pilot officer with effect from 24 June. The next month, he proceeded to No. 10 Flying Training School at Tern Hill.

== Second World War ==
In December 1939, with his training completed, Urwin-Mann was sent to Athan for a conversion course on the Hawker Hurricane fighter. He was confirmed in his pilot officer rank at the end of the month and then in January 1940 was posted to No. 253 Squadron. At the time, the squadron was based at Manston and working up to operational status with its Hurricanes. It achieved this in April, and began to ferry aircraft to France for the fighter squadrons there. In May, just after the commencement of the Battle of France, Urwin-Mann was transferred to the newly formed No. 238 Squadron, which was based at Tangmere.

=== Battle of Britain ===
At the start of July, No. 238 Squadron was deemed ready for operations as part of No. 10 Group, operating from Middle Wallop, and soon became heavily engaged in the aerial fighting over the south west coast. On 11 July Urwin-Mann was one of three pilots that shot down a Messerschmitt Bf 110 heavy fighter to the south east of Portland. Two days later, he again combined with other pilots to destroy a Bf 110, also near Portland. The same day, he also claimed a Bf 110 as destroyed but this was not confirmed. On 20 July he made another claim that could not be confirmed, this time a Heinkel He 59 seaplane which was attacked to the south of The Needles. He destroyed a Messerschmitt Bf 109 fighter over Portland on 11 August and two days afterward, in the same vicinity, shot down another aircraft of the same type. The squadron shifted west the next day to St Eval in Cornwall and on 21 August, Urwin-Mann destroyed a Junkers Ju 88 medium bomber north of Trevose Head on 21 August.

No. 238 Squadron returned to Middle Wallop in September and as the Luftwaffe increased its attacks on the south east of England, was called upon to intercept the incoming raids. On 15 September, subsequently known as Battle of Britain Day, Urwin-Mann claimed two aerial victories. The first was a Heinkel He 111 medium bomber that was confirmed as shot down to the south of London. The second was another He 111, deemed to have been probably destroyed in the same area. He shot down another two He 111s over Bristol on 25 September and the next day destroyed a Bf 110 over the Isle of Wight. He damaged another Bf 110 on 27 September and his final aerial victory of the Battle of Britain was on 7 October, when he destroyed a Ju 88 west of Portland. His successes saw him awarded the Distinguished Flying Cross (DFC), the official announcement being made in The London Gazette on 26 November. The published citation read:

This officer has displayed initiative and dash in his many engagements against the enemy. He has led his section in an excellent manner and has destroyed at least eight enemy aircraft.

— London Gazette, No. 35219, 15 July 1941

Urwin-Mann was promoted to flying officer at the end of 1940. The pace of operations slowed down over the winter months and the squadron only saw infrequent action for the early part of 1941.

=== Service in North Africa and the Mediterranean ===
In May 1941, No. 238 Squadron was sent to North Africa. Reequipped with Hurricane Mk IIC fighters and based at Landing Ground 92, it flew patrols in Egypt and Libya and carried out sweeps and bomber escort duties. On 9 December, Urwin-Mann damaged a Bf 109 and ended the year as one of the squadron's flight commanders, being promoted to flight lieutenant on 27 December.

At the start of 1942, Urwin-Mann was given command of his own unit, No. 80 Squadron, which he led until April. During his time as its leader, it was primarily involved in defensive patrolling of the Nile Delta region. He was subsequently awarded a Bar to his DFC. Taken off operations, he served six months in a staff role at the headquarters of RAF Middle East Command. He returned to flying duties in October 1942 with an appointment as the commander of No. 126 Squadron, based at Malta at the time and operating Supermarine Spitfire fighters. The squadron was beginning to fly to Sicily on offensive sweeps and escort missions, as well as in a fighter-bomber role, and on one of these, carried out on 28 January 1943, he probably destroyed a Messerschmitt Me 210 heavy fighter. Promoted to squadron leader on 6 March 1943, the following month he was involved in an accident, when an aircraft of a photo reconnaissance unit crashed into his Spitfire while he was waiting to take off. His injuries, which were burnt upper limbs and face, warranted repatriation to England for medical care. During his recovery, it was announced that he would be awarded the Distinguished Service Order. The published citation read:

Within the past six months whilst operating from Malta, this officer has completed a large number of sorties, involving attacks on factories, warehouses, port installations, power stations and airfields in Sicily and nearby enemy islands. On one occasion he led a formation which attacked an airfield and destroyed many aircraft on the ground. Squadron-Leader Urwin-Mann also obtained a hit on a petrol installation, causing a violent explosion and a large fire. Another of his successes was the destruction of a portion of the main railway line during a sortie at Gela in January 1943. During the same operations Squadron Leader Urwin-Mann engaged a Messerschmitt 210, shooting away its starboard engine. By his great skill and inspiring leadership this officer has raised his squadron to a high pitch of fighting efficiency.

— London Gazette, No. 36015, 14 May 1943

=== Later war service ===
When he recovered from his injuries, Urwin-Mann was posted to Air Defence of Great Britain, to serve at its headquarters at Bentley Priory. He was here for six months before, in January 1944, being assigned to instructing duties at No. 53 Operational Training Unit. Later in the year, he served in a Group Support Unit, before taking up a post as an instructor at No. 61 OTU, based at Rednal. When the war ended, he was serving at the Central Fighter Establishment at Tangmere station. He is credited with having shot down ten aircraft, two of which being shared with other pilots. Two additional aircraft were claimed as destroyed but were unconfirmed. He also probably destroyed two aircraft and damaged two others.

== Postwar service ==
Urwin-Mann was granted a permanent commission in the RAF as a flight lieutenant on 1 September 1945. At the time, he was serving in a staff role at the Air Ministry. In August 1947, he was posted to West Raynham as an instructor at the Day Fighter Leaders' School for several months before shifting in October 1948 to Tangmere to serve at the Instrument Training School (ITS). He returned to operational flying with a posting to No. 1 Squadron in July 1949 but the following year went back to the ITS. After an attachment to the Instrument Landing School at Digby, he spent time instructing on English Electric Canberra jet bombers before retiring from the RAF on 15 March 1959 as a squadron leader.

== Later life ==
Returning to civilian life, Urwin-Mann worked in sales management roles for a number of years before working for National Westminster Bank. He retired to the south of England and died on 7 March 1999.
