= John Topham (RAF officer) =

British flying ace of WWII

- Born: 18 March 1917; Bradford, England
- Died: early 1987 (aged 69)
- Military career
- Allegiance: United Kingdom
- Branch: Royal Air Force
- Rank: Air Commodore
- Commands: Air Forces Gulf; College of Air Warfare; RAF Waterbeach; No. 125 Squadron; No. 54 Operational Training Unit
- Conflicts: Second World War: Battle of Britain; The Blitz; Invasion of Normandy; Cold War
- Awards: Distinguished Service Order; Officer of the Order of the British Empire; Distinguished Flying Cross & Bar

John Topham DSO, OBE, DFC & Bar (18 March 1917–early 1987) was a British flying ace with the Royal Air Force (RAF) during the Second World War. He was credited with having destroyed at least thirteen German aircraft and went on to serve in the RAF in the postwar period.

Born in Bradford, Topham joined the RAF in early 1939 and was commissioned as a pilot officer by the end of the year. Posted to No. 219 Squadron, he flew Bristol Blenheim night fighters and made his first claim for an aerial victory during the Battle of Britain. He destroyed a number of aircraft during 1941 to 1942, with Sergeant H. Berridge as his radar operator, and was awarded the Distinguished Flying Cross & Bar for his successes. After being rested for much of 1943, he was given command of No. 125 Squadron, a night fighter unit, overseeing the squadron's adoption of the de Havilland Mosquito heavy fighter. Still paired with Berridge, he shot down more aircraft as the squadron operated over northern France and was awarded the Distinguished Service Order in late 1944.

Topham remained in the RAF after the war and held several staff and command positions. He served as a staff officer overseas at South East Asia Command and Far East Air Force. Appointed an Officer of the Order of the British Empire in 1952, he subsequently commanded the RAF station at Waterbeach and was commandant of the RAF College of Air Warfare. He retired from the RAF in 1968 as an air commodore. He died in early 1987, aged 69.

== Early life ==
John Groves Topham was born on 18 March 1917 in Bradford, England, and was educated at Manchester's Stand Grammar School. In early 1939, he obtained a short service commission in the Royal Air Force (RAF) and commenced initial flight training, at No. 6 Elementary & Reserve Flying Training School at Sywell, on 23 January. After three months, he proceeded to the next phase of training at No. 11 Flying Training School in Shawbury and at its conclusion, on 23 October, was confirmed in his rank as a pilot officer.

== Second World War ==
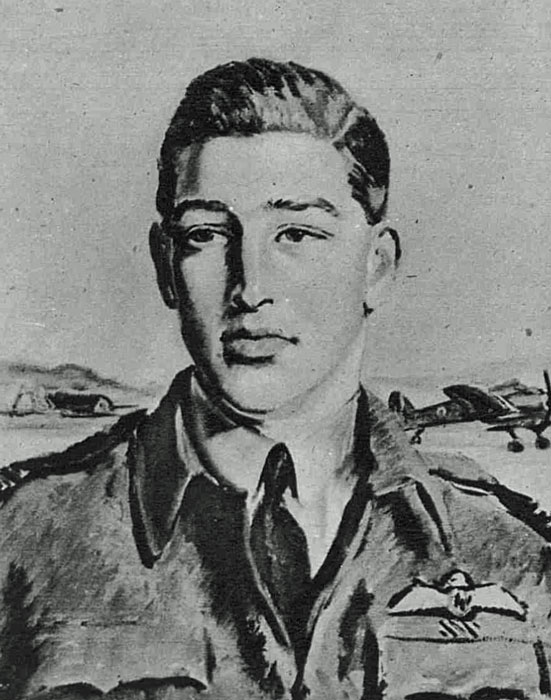
A portrait of John Topham, painted by official war artist Olive Snell during the period 1942–1944

With the Second World War under way, Topham was posted to No. 219 Squadron. This was a newly formed unit, based at Catterick, which was training on Bristol Blenheims in a night fighter role. It became fully operational in February 1940 but during the later stages of the Battle of Britain was occasionally called upon to assist in dealing with Luftwaffe raids in the south of England. On the night of 15 August, Topham engaged and probably destroyed a Junkers Ju 88 medium bomber near Flamborough Head.

=== Night fighting duties ===
In September, No. 219 Squadron began to convert to the Bristol Beaufighter night fighter and the following month it commenced operating from Redhill, near London. At this time, Topham was promoted to flying officer. Paired with Sergeant H. Berridge as his radar operator, Topham shot down a Heinkel He 111 medium bomber to the north of Selsey Bill on the night of 13 March 1941. Three months later, on 13 June, he shot down an unidentified aircraft north of Worthing. By early 1942, Topham was commanding one of the squadron's flights and had been promoted to acting squadron leader. His successes as a night fighter pilot saw him awarded the Distinguished Flying Cross (DFC). The announcement was made on 3 March 1942; the citation, published in The London Gazette, read:

This officer has participated in operational flying over a long period. He is a skilful and keen night fighter pilot and, although he has frequently carried out his sorties in extremely unfavourable flying conditions, he has destroyed 2 Junkers 88's. Squadron Leader Topham has at all times set a worthy example.

— London Gazette, No. 35475, 3 March 1942

Topham shot down a Dornier Do 17 medium bomber 40 miles (64 km) south of Worthingon the night of 25 April. This was followed by his destruction of a He 111 near Brighton during a night time sortie on 7 May. He destroyed a Ju 88 north of Bembridge on the night of 8 June. A month later, during the night of 6–7 July, he shot down a Dornier Do 217 medium bomber near Amble. He was subsequently awarded a Bar to his DFC. The published citation read:

his officer has performed work of outstanding merit. A skilful pilot and a fine leader, Squadron Leader Topham has been tireless in his efforts to attain success. By his personal example he has been largely responsible for the high standard of morale existing in his squadron. Squadron Leader Topham has destroyed five enemy aircraft during sorties at night.

— London Gazette, No. 35630, 14 July 1942

On a night time sortie on 25–26 July, Topham shot down a pair of Do 217s, both east of Blyth. A further Do 217 was destroyed by Topham on the night of 19 September, this time near Cambois Bay. At the end of the year, both he and Berridge, who had also been awarded the DFC and Bar for his work alongside Topham, were rested. At this time, Topham was promoted to acting wing commander although his substantive rank was flight lieutenant.

=== Squadron command ===
Topham commanded No. 54 Operational Training Unit (OTU) at Charterhall for several months. During this time his substantive rank was made up to squadron leader. In October 1943, he returned to operational duties as commander of No. 125 Squadron, where he was reunited with Berridge as his radar operator. His squadron was based at Exeter at the time and operated the Beaufighter on night fighting duties as well as aerial search and rescue missions. In early 1944 it began to convert to the de Havilland Mosquito heavy fighter. In one of these, Topham destroyed a Junkers Ju 188 medium bomber 10 miles (16 km) to the south of St Catherine's Point. Two nights later he shot down a Ju 88 near Cherbourg. On a sortie in the same area on the night of 27 May, he damaged a Messerschmitt Me 410 heavy fighter.

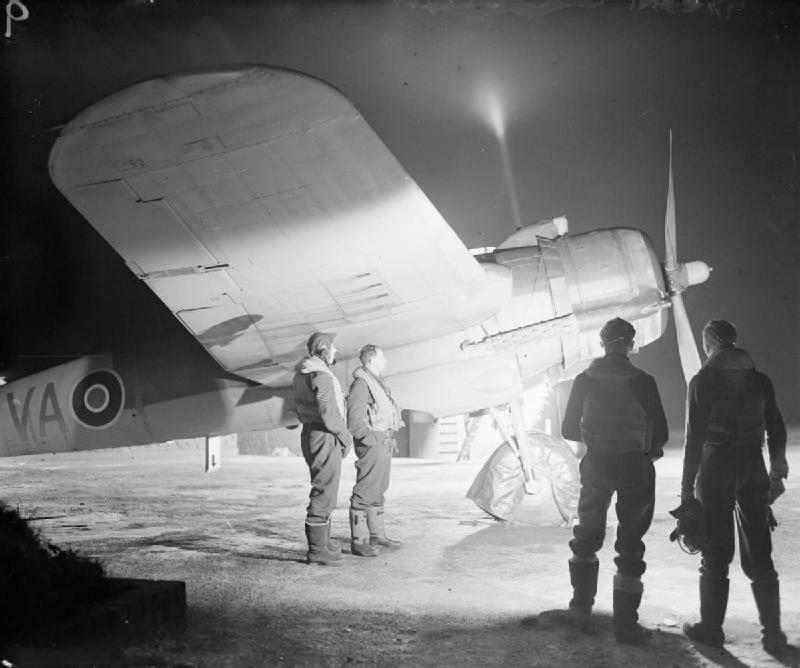
A Bristol Beaufighter night fighter of No. 125 Squadron at Exeter

During the invasion of Normandy, No. 125 Squadron was tasked with night time patrols over the landing beaches. On one of these patrols on the night of 18 June, Topham destroyed a pair of Ju 88s. The following month, the squadron switched duties, and was now engaged with intercepting V-1 flying bombs that were launched at southeast England. In September, Topham was awarded the Distinguished Service Order (DSO). The citation for the DSO read:

This officer has completed a large number of operational flying hours since being awarded a Bar to the Distinguished Flying Cross. His knowledge of all aspects of night fighting tactics is profound and his example of courage and tenacity has impressed all. Fourteen enemy aircraft have fallen to his guns at night.

— London Gazette, No. 36682, 1 September 1944

Along with Berridge, Topham was stood down from operations at the end of the year. He spent the remainder of the war as the chief flying instructor at No. 51 OTU at Cranfield.

== Postwar career ==
Topham opted to remain in the RAF in the postwar period. After attending the RAF Staff College at Bracknell, he was sent to South East Asia Command in Ceylon (now Sri Lanka) as a staff officer. In January 1946 Topham was appointed commander of a fighter wing in Japan as part of the British Commonwealth Occupation Force. He returned to the United Kingdom in 1948 with a posting to the Air Ministry. From 1951 to 1953 he was the wing leader at the Night Operational Conversion Unit at Leeming. In the 1952 New Year Honours, he was made an Officer of the Order of the British Empire. Leaving the United Kingdom after ending his appointment at Leeming, he served on the staff at the headquarters of the Far East Air Force in Singapore. In 1956 Topham was posted to the headquarters of No. 11 Group and then, promoted to group captain, was commander of the RAF station at Waterbeach.

Later leading a RAF training command in Nigeria, Topham subsequently served as the commandant of the RAF College of Air Warfare in Manby. He was promoted to air commodore in January 1965. His final appointment was as the commanding officer of Air Forces Gulf. He retired from the RAF in August 1968 and died in early 1987, at the age of 69. He is credited with having shot down thirteen aircraft, with one further aircraft deemed to be probably destroyed. He is also credited with one damaged.
