= Fiumefreddo Bruzio =

Fiumefreddo Bruzio Jiumifriddu (Calabrian)
- Comune
- Comune di Fiumefreddo Bruzio
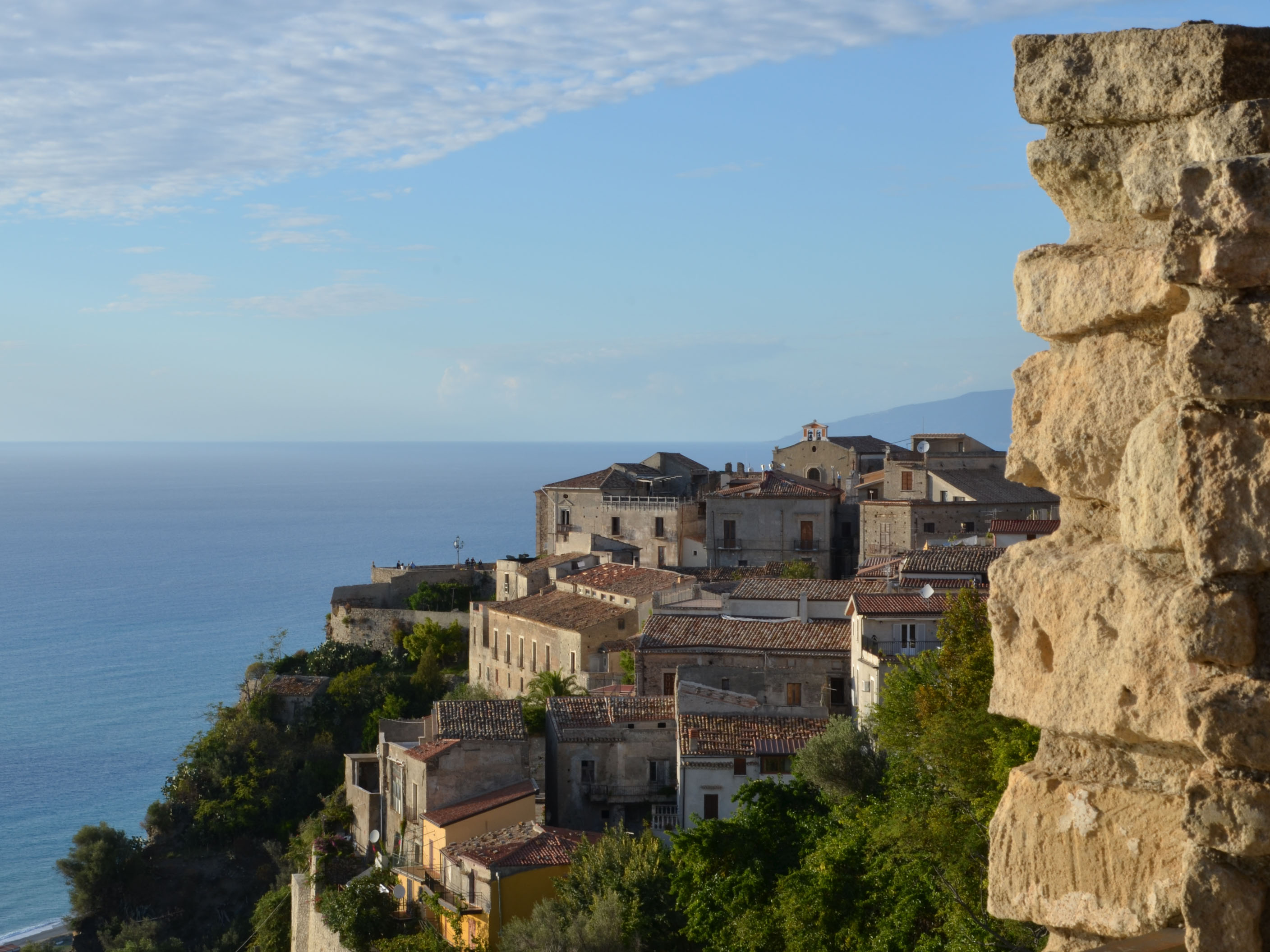
- View from Castello della Valle

- Location within Italy Location within Calabria
- Coordinates: 39°14′N 16°4′E
- Country: Italy
- Region: Calabria
- Province: Cosenza (CS)
- Frazioni: Stazione, Regio, Scaro, San Biase, Badia, Cariglio, Cutura, Destro, Centro Storico

Government
  - Mayor: Fortunato Rosario Barone

Area
  - Total: 32.06 km^{2} (12.38 sq mi)
- Elevation: 220 m (720 ft)

Population (2026)
  - Total: 3,979
  - Density: 124.1/km^{2} (321.4/sq mi)
- Demonym: Fiumefreddesi
- Time zone: UTC+1 (CET)
  - Summer (DST): UTC+2 (CEST)
- Postal code: 87030
- Dialing code: 0982
- Patron saint: Immaculate Conception
- Website: Official website

Fiumefreddo Bruzio (Calabrian: Jiumifriddu) is a town and comune (municipality) in the province of Cosenza in the region of Calabria in southern Italy. It has 3,979 inhabitants.

Fiumefreddo borders the municipalities of Cerisano, Falconara Albanese, Longobardi, and Mendicino.

It is one of I Borghi più belli d'Italia ("The most beautiful villages of Italy").

== Geography ==
Fiumefreddo Bruzio is located on the coast of Tyrrhenian Sea, in the south of the province of Cosenza. It borders with Falconara Albanese (North) and Longobardi (South).

The town covers a surface of about 30 square kilometers (11.58 square miles). Even though the territory is predominantly hilly, it is characterized by a strong morphological variety, in fact, starting from sea level, the altitude grows up to 1541m on the peak of Monte Cocuzzo, the highest mountain on the coastline.

== Demographics ==
As of 2026, the population is 3,979, of which 50.1% are males, and 49.9% are females. Minors make up 11.4% of the population, and seniors make up 21.4%.

Historical population

Year	Pop.	±%
1861	4,559	—
1871	4,463	−2.1%
1881	4,216	−5.5%
1901	4,481	+6.3%
1911	4,053	−9.6%
1921	4,673	+15.3%
1931	4,997	+6.9%
1936	5,152	+3.1%

Year	Pop.	±%
1951	5,662	+9.9%
1961	4,803	−15.2%
1971	4,109	−14.4%
1981	4,072	−0.9%
1991	3,632	−10.8%
2001	3,363	−7.4%
2011	3,078	−8.5%
2021	2,799	−9.1%

Source: ISTAT

=== Immigration ===
As of 2025, immigrants make up 30.9% of the population. The 5 largest foreign countries of birth are Argentina, Brazil, Switzerland, Ukraine, and Romania.

Foreign-born population (2025)
Country of birth	Population	Country of birth	Population
Argentina	770	Peru	13
Brazil	266	Uruguay	12
Switzerland	35	Venezuela	9
Ukraine	19	Germany	8
Romania	15	United States	6

== Main sights ==
- Castello della Valle, founded in 1201. The entrance has a 16th-century Renaissance portal. It houses several works of local painter Salvatore Fiume. The castle was besieged in 1806-1807 by French troops, and nearly destroyed.
- Mother Church, completed in 1674.
- Palazzo Zupi (16th century)
- Palazzo Pignatelli
- Church of San Rocco: the dome of this church was also painted by Salvatore Fiume.
- Church of Madonna del Carmelo
- Fonte Laurato Abbey, located by the Fiume di mare river
- Church of San Michele
- Church of Santa Rita

== Culture ==
=== Cuisine ===
The local gastronomy, as like as the gastronomy of southern Italy, is characterized by simple dishes, but very spicy (hot peppers, parsley, basil, rosemary, garlic and onions are the most used spices). The dishes that better represent the cuisine of Fiumefreddo Bruzio are mainly two: the Filiciata and the Frittata di patate.

The Filiciata is a soft cheese, placed in layers of ferns. It was usually served during the Assunzione di Maria Vergine holiday (Ferragosto) on August 15.

The Frittata di patate is a sort of fried omelette (even though it has the shape of a cake) made with potatoes from local farms. Even though it is called frittata (omelette), eggs are not needed to make it.

Among the other dishes of the province of Cosenza there are Cuddrurieddri, grispeddre, calabrian eggplant meatballs, stuffed alices and many more.

== Notable people ==
- Aristide Colonna (1909–1999), classical philologist and professor at the University of Perugia, was born in contrada Torre del piccolo in Fiumefreddo Bruzio
