= Politano =

Politano is an Italian surname. Notable people with the surname include:

- Antonio Politano (born 1967), Italian cyclist
- Matteo Politano (born 1993), Italian footballer
- Wladimiro Politano (born 1940), Italian sculptor, painter, and drawer
