= Falconara Albanese =

- Comune
- Comune di Falconara Albanese
- Coat of arms

- Location within Italy Location within Calabria
- Coordinates: 39°17′N 16°05′E
- Country: Italy
- Region: Calabria
- Province: Cosenza (CS)

Government
  - Mayor: FRANCESCO ALFREDO MARCELLO CANDREVA

Area
  - Total: 18 km^{2} (6.9 sq mi)
- Elevation: 602 m (1,975 ft)

Population (30 October 2007)
  - Total: 1,422
  - Density: 79/km^{2} (200/sq mi)
- Demonym: Falconaresi
- Time zone: UTC+1 (CET)
  - Summer (DST): UTC+2 (CEST)
- Postal code: 87030
- Dialing code: 0982
- Website: Official website

Falconara Albanese (Arbëreshë Albanian: Fallkunara) is an Arbëreshë town and comune in the province of Cosenza in the Calabria region of southern Italy. It is home to the Arbëresh minority.

== History ==
Falconara Albanese was founded by seven "Albanian noble families", who arrived in Calabria in the 15th century to escape the Turkish invasion of Albania. The families followed soon after Eleonora, sister of Giovanni Castriota King of Albania, married the Prince of Bisignano Sollazzi. The families initially settled by the coast between San Lucido and Fiumefreddo Bruzio, but soon moved inland at the sight of Turkish ships. The name of the settlement derived from the falcon bird that nested among the crevices of the Castelluccio. "Albanese" was added much later in 1863 due to the citizen's heritage.

== Climate ==
Falconara Albanese has a temperate climate. The summers are hot and dry, while the winters are warm and short. This region has an average of 332.56 sunny days per year, and rain occurs mostly in winter months.

== Geography ==
Falconara Albanese sits on a hilly ridge 602 meters above sea level. The landscape is stony, hilly terrain, with wooded areas where figs and olives grow. The dry climate of the Calabria region supports the growth of Grapevines. At higher inland elevations, chestnut trees become more prominent for cultivation or personal use. The distance to the Tyrrhenian Sea is approximately 6 km (3.7 miles).

=== Mountains ===
- Monte Cocuzzo is a prominent peak in the area, reaching an elevation of 1,541 meters above sea level. It can be seen from Falconara Albanese, located four to six miles Southeast.
- Cozzo Del Monte lies Northwest of Falconara Albanese, contributing to the scenic landscape.

==== Rivers ====
- The Malpertuso River divides the commune from San Lucido
- The Peschiera River contains large trout, separating Falconara Albanese from the territory of Fiumefreddo Bruzio.

== Landmarks ==
=== Castellucio ===
Isolated monolith at the North of the village, approximately 50 meters high. Almost 100 carved stairs lead to the summit, where a large cross stands. Beneath lies Chiesa della Madonna dell’Assunta (Church of the Assumption). Located externally at this chapel is a sculpture of Madonna Assunta, a religious figure, her body carved from black lava stone and her head and extremities carved from white marble.

==== Church of the Madonna del Buonconsiglio ====
This church was built in the mid-eighteenth century, dedicated to the patron saint of the Albanians. A grand carved altar built in 1750 depicts the Madonna del Buonconsiglio and is adorned with Baroque stucco. Other frescos of religious figures, such as the Virgin Mary and Jesus Christ, stand before the altar.

== Festa Della Madonna Del Buon Consiglio ==
The community of Falconara Albanese holds an annual celebration honoring Our Lady of Good Counsel, a figure venerated in Catholicism as a source of spiritual guidance. The event reflects the village's religious traditions and cultural heritage.

== Demographics ==
=== Language ===
The minority language of Arbëreshë is spoken in Falconara Albanese and many other Albanian villages that settled in Southern Italy. The language was known only as “Albanese” before the 1990’s, before it was changed to demonstrate the distinct lingual heritage of Arbëreshë and distinguish the difference in dialects between it and the Albanian language. Until the 1980’s, Arbëreshë was a spoken language, the exception being in biblical text from the Italo-Albanian church. Arbëreshë contains features from the medieval Albanian language from before the 16th century, at the same time period when the Ottoman Empire invaded Albania.

==== Italian Regions Where Arbëreshë is spoken ====
- Abruzzi
- Basilicata
- Calabria
- Campania
- Molise
- Apulia
- Sicily

=== Religion ===
The Arbëreshë brought with them from Albania the Byzantine Rite, as seen in Italo-Albanian Catholic churches. Now, their religion is mainly Roman Catholic in practice, as the Byzantine Rite has declined over time due to cultural assimilation.
