= Lago, Calabria =

Lago
- Comune
- Comune di Lago
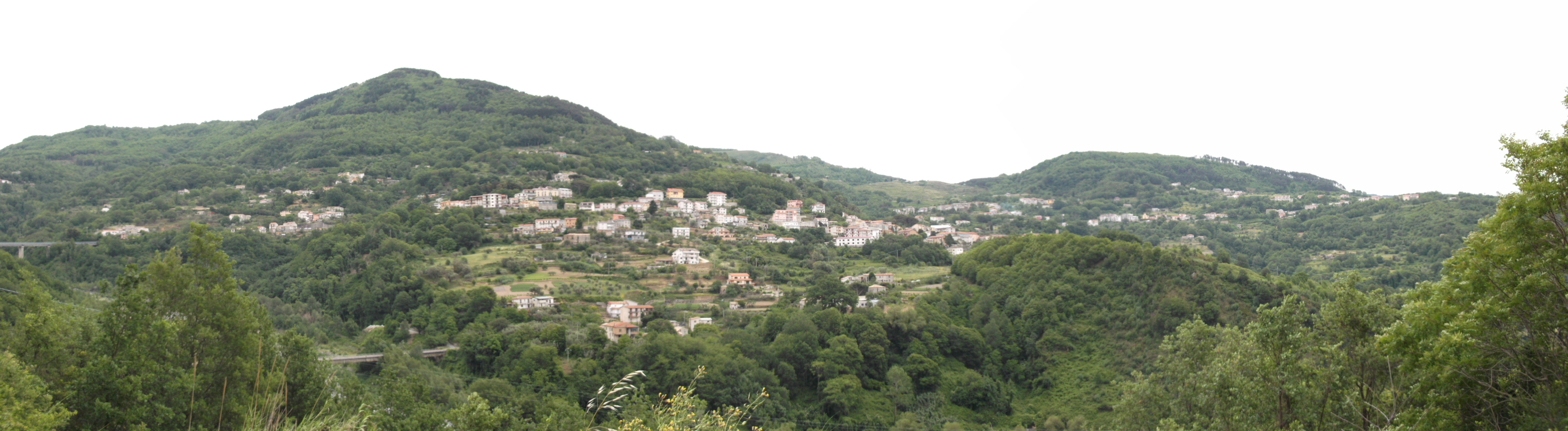

- Location within Italy Location within Calabria
- Coordinates: 39°10′N 16°09′E
- Country: Italy
- Region: Calabria
- Province: Cosenza (CS)
- Frazioni: Aria di Lupi, Cafosa, Chiorio, Fontanella, Greci, Palomandro, Paragieri, Piscopie, Ponticelli, Laghitello, Margi, Rovettari, Sangineto, Scavolio, Terrati, Vasci, Versaggi, Zaccanelle

Government
  - Mayor: Enzo Scanga

Area
  - Total: 49 km^{2} (19 sq mi)
- Elevation: 429 m (1,407 ft)

Population (2001)
  - Total: 3,092
  - Density: 63/km^{2} (160/sq mi)
- Demonym: Laghitani
- Time zone: UTC+1 (CET)
  - Summer (DST): UTC+2 (CEST)
- Postal code: 87035
- Dialing code: 0982
- Patron saint: Saint Nicholas
- Saint day: 6 December
- Website: Official website

Lago (Laghitano: U' Vacu) is a comune in the province of Cosenza, Calabria, in southern Italy. It is located 42 kilometers from the city of Cosenza.

== Geography and topography ==
Lago is located in the mountainous interior of the Cosenza Province, near the slopes of Monte Cocuzzo. Despite being sited in mountainous territory, the higher elevations of the city offer views of the nearby coastline, including Stromboli. It regularly snows in Lago in the winter.

== History ==
=== Prehistory and ancient era ===
The pre-historic tribe living in Cosenza called themselves the "Itali" and it was from them where Italy drew its name. They called their land, "Viteliu," which means "land of the life-giving calf." Around 500 B.C., these Italic tribes were conquered by and merged into another Italic tribe called the Bretti (Latin Brutti), who named their country "Brettiōn." They were a rebellious offshoot of the Lucanians, and their name may mean "renegades." They spoke Oscan, and named Cosenza (then called "Consentia") as their capital. Around 300 B.C. the region was at its apex of power and culture. Its position – near the Greek and Carthaginian ports, home to a conquering tribe of Lucanians and Brettians, and with decent relations with Rome and the Etruscan cities, meant that it enjoyed great wealth. The Bretti minted elaborate coins, which are sought after by collectors.

The Bretti and Lucanians were stubborn resistors of Greek culture. Greeks had colonized the coastal cities of Sicily and Southern Italy, but the Bretti and Lucanians refused to yield. Alexander the Great's uncle, Alexander of Epirus invaded Cosenza in 331 B.C. In a battle near Lago, the combined native force defeated his army and killed him.

The Bretti declined in power precipitously after making bad choices against the Roman Republic. After they sided with Hannibal in the Second Punic War, Rome confiscated half of their territory, and insisted on the right to clear cut their forests, which ended up supplying the timber and pitch for Roman fleets.

Rome began settling the families of veteran soldiers in the Cosenza area. Roman colonies were located around Lago in what is now Campora San Giovanni (Amantea), 10 miles from Lago, in 194 B.C., and also in Figline Vegliaturo, San Lucido, and Cosenza. In addition, much the neighboring territory of Amantea proper was given to the Roman people as public land – anyone could homestead there and grow crops. Finally, the Romans also likely located a small military base near Lago, in modern Aiello Calabro. Combined, these mechanisms “romanized” the population.

=== Middle Ages ===
What was likely a small settlement of Romano-Bretti stock existed through the Dark Ages and was not augmented significantly until 1088 A.D. In that year, the Saracens sacked the city of Cosenza, driving the inhabitants into the mountainous interior. The small hamlets around Cosenza saw a population explosion. It is near this date that Lago is first mentioned in copious documents, as the Latin "Lacum." It is likely that the population was further augmented by lowlanders, who understood that mosquitoes do not breed above a certain elevation, as it was also during this time that the low-lying parts of Southern Italy had serious problems with malaria.

In the early Middle Ages, Lago was located in what was likely a border region. The nearby towns, bearing names like Longobardi and Tarifa, likely indicate that the border between Lombard domains and Byzantine territory ran through Lago territory.

Politically, Lago was a domain of the House of Cybo-Malaspina for much of its feudal history.

During the late Renaissance, several churches in Lago were built, some of which are still standing. The church, “Madonna of the Mountains,” built in 1652, is renowned for its architecture and art. Similar to the rest of Cosenza and Catanzaro, Lago was a center of world silk production during the Middle Ages. In the 1753 census of Lago commissioned by the Kingdom of Naples, wealth was counted primarily by how many mulberry trees one owned.

=== Origin of the Name ===
Lago means “lake” in Italian, but there is no lake there. However, the Licetto (“Eliceto,” “Acero”) River turns sharply at the edge of town and has a history of silting up. Lago was likely named after a bulge in the river, much like Lake Havasu, which is not a lake, but a bulge in the Colorado River. The historian Don Cupelli believes that any other theories on the origin of the name are mythical.

=== Cuisine ===
The cuisine of Lago is typical of Southern Italy. Its desserts ("turdilli") and salumi are renowned around the region. Wine production is healthy and varied, with the Magliocco Dolce grape most widely cultivated.

=== Notables ===
- Wladimiro Politano, sculptor, painter and drawer
- Astronaut Mario Runco Jr., first-generation American of Laghitan heritage
- Italo Scanga, Italian-American artist
