= RAF Tingley =

RAF Tingley
- Lake Fetzara, El Bouni District in Algeria

Site information
- Type: Royal Air Force station
- Owner: Air Ministry
- Operator: Royal Air Force

Location
- Shown within Algeria
- Coordinates: 36°49′01″N 07°36′15″E

Site history
- Built: 1940s
- In use: 1940s
- Battles/wars: Mediterranean and Middle East theatre of World War II

Royal Air Force Tingley or more simply RAF Tingley is a former Royal Air Force station located to the northeast of Lake Fetzara, El Bouni District, Algeria.

The following squadrons were here at some point:

- No. 32 Squadron RAF between 21 May and 19 August 1943 with the Supermarine Spitfire VC & IX and the Hawker Hurricane IIC
- No. 43 (China-British) Squadron RAF between 19 April and 2 May 1943 with the Spitfire VC
- No. 81 Squadron RAF between 26 January and 17 March 1943 with the VC & IX
- No. 87 (United Provinces) Squadron RAF between 22 May and 13 August 1943 with the Spitfire VB, VC & IX
- No. 154 (Motor Industries) Squadron RAF between 17 January and 16 March 1943 with the Spitfire VB & IX
- No. 232 Squadron RAF between 12 January and 16 March 1943 with the Spitfire VB
- No. 242 (Canadian) Squadron RAF between 13 March and 19 April 1943 with the Spitfire VB
- No. 243 Squadron RAF between 13 and 28 January 1943 with the Spitfire VB & VC
- Detachment from No. 255 Squadron RAF between December 1942 and May 1943 with the Bristol Beaufighter VIF
- No. 283 Squadron RAF between 13 and 30 May 1943 with the Supermarine Walrus
- Detachment from No. 600 (City of London) Squadron AAF between January and June 1943 with the Beaufighter VIF

== See also ==
- List of former Royal Air Force stations
