= No. 600 Squadron RAuxAF =

No. 600 (City of London) Squadron RAuxAF
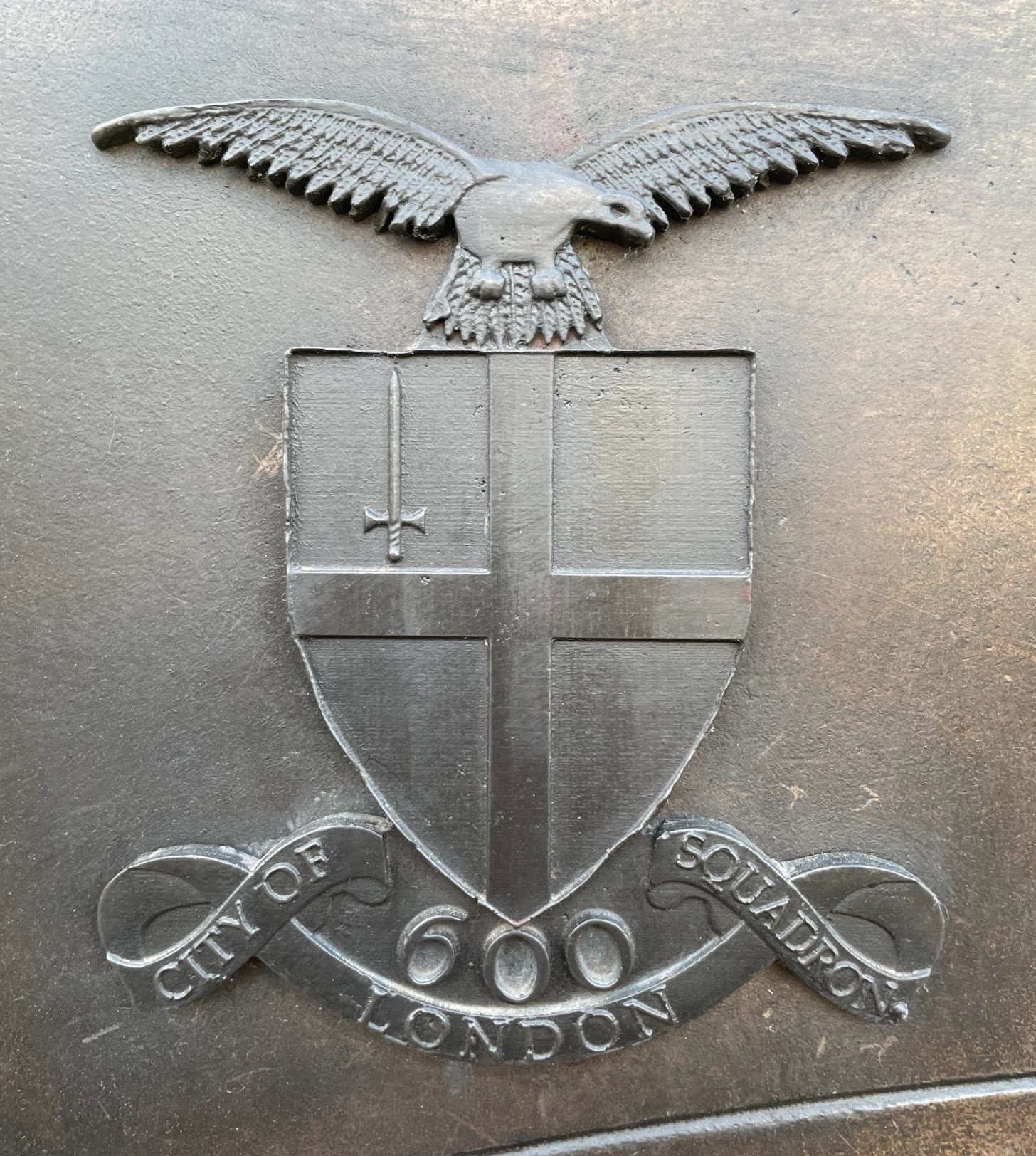
- One of the heraldic badges of the squadron depicted on the Battle of Britain Monument in London
- Active: 14 October 1925 – 21 August 1945; 10 May 1946 – 10 March 1957; 1 October 1999 – present
- Country: United Kingdom
- Branch: Royal Air Force
- Part of: Royal Auxiliary Air Force
- Base: RAF Northolt, London
- Nickname: City of London
- Mottos: Latin: Praeter sescentos (Translation: "More than six hundred")
- Battle honours: France and Low Countries, 1940*; Battle of Britain, 1940*; Home defence, 1940–42*; North Africa, 1942–43*; Sicily, 1943*; Italy, 1943–45*, Salerno*, Anzio & Nettuno*, Gustav Line, Gothic Line; The honours marked with an asterisk* are those emblazoned on the Squadron Standard

Commanders
- Officer Commanding: Wing Commander Stephen Duddy
- Honorary Air Commodore: Hugh Trenchard, 3rd Viscount Trenchard

Insignia
- Squadron Badge heraldry: No 600 is the only squadron in the RAF to have two official badges In front of an increscent, a sword on bend The crescent moon represents the squadron's night-fighter activities whilst the sword commemorates the connection with the city of London; The City of London arms, overflown by an eagle Also known as 'the dust-cart crest'
- Squadron Codes: MV (Jan 1939 – Sep 1939); BQ (Sep 1939 – Aug 1943); 6 (Aug 1943 – Jul 1944); RAG (May 1946 – 1949); LJ (1949 – Apr 1951)
- Post 1950 Squadron markings

No. 600 (City of London) Squadron Royal Auxiliary Air Force is a squadron of the RAF Reserves. It was formed in 1925 and operated as a night fighter squadron during the Second World War with great distinction. After the war, 600 Squadron went on to operate jet fighters until 1957. Reactivated in 1999, 600 Squadron is one of only two RAF Reserve units within the M25. It is a Headquarters Support Squadron and provides trained part-time reservists to support RAF operations around the world.

== History ==
=== Formation ===
No. 600 (City of London) Squadron RAuxAF was formed at RAF Northolt on 14 October 1925 as a unit of the Auxiliary Air Force, equipped with Avro 504 trainers and Airco DH.9A day bombers. It moved to RAF Hendon at the end of 1926, replacing its DH.9As, veterans of the First World War, with more modern Westland Wapitis in 1929. It was designated a fighter squadron in July 1934.

=== Second World War ===
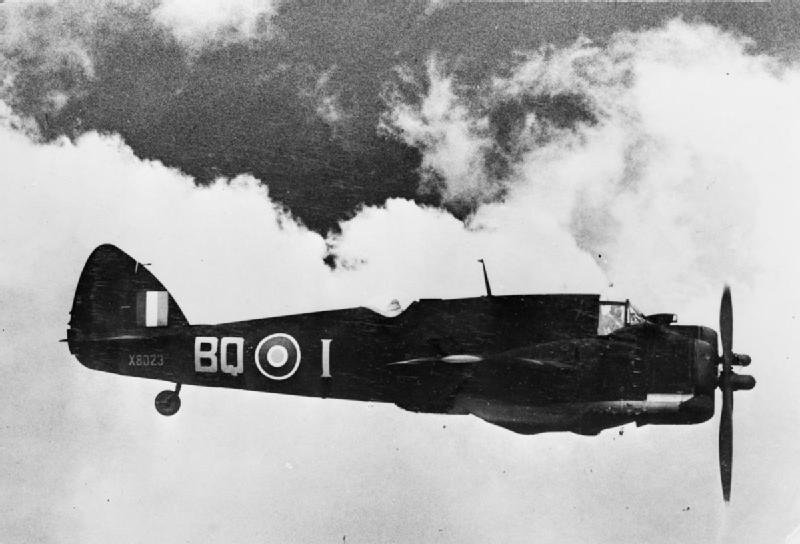
Bristol Beaufighter VIF Night Fighter with No.600 Squadron code 'BQ-I', based at RAF Predannack, Cornwall, c.1942–43

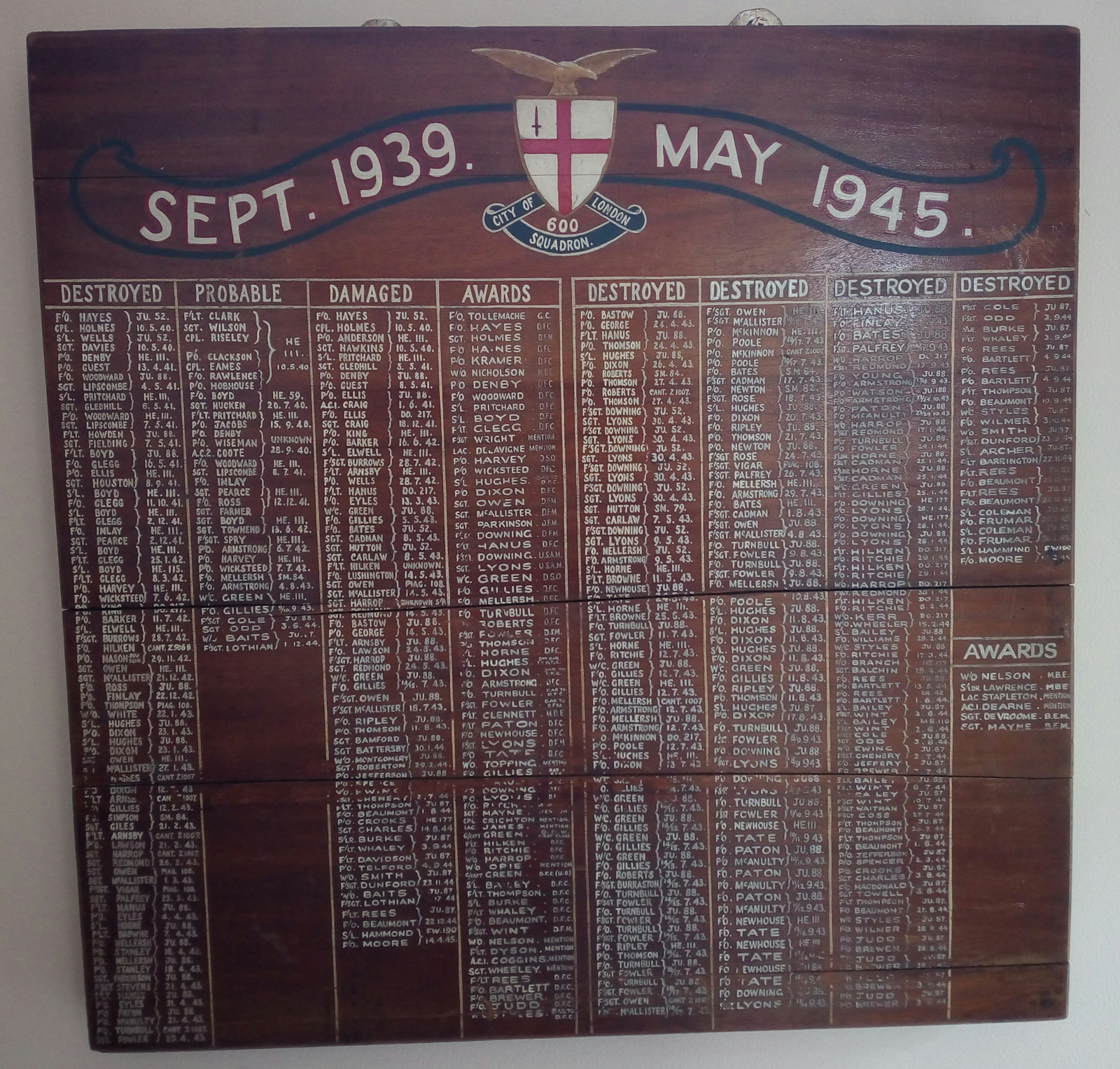
600 Squadron's World War 2 scoreboard, displayed at the RAF Air Defence Radar Museum, 2019

At the outbreak of war the squadron was equipped with Bristol Blenheim 1F long range fighters equipped with ventral gun packs, and moved from Hendon to RAF Northolt. Day and night patrols were flown, with experiments involving airborne radar beginning in December 1939. When the Germans invaded The Netherlands, the squadron flew patrols over the Low Countries, but on 10 May 1940 the squadron lost five out of six Blenheims sent to attack Waalhaven. In view of the inadequacy of Blenheims for daylight operations, 600 Sqn was allocated to night defence only a few days later. In September 1940, the first Bristol Beaufighter was received, conversion being completed early in 1941. In October 1940 the squadron moved to Yorkshire and in March 1941 to south-west England, where it remained until September 1942. In November 1942, 600 Sqn moved to North Africa to provide night cover for Allied bases and shipping. It was transferred to Malta in June 1943, and in September, to Italy where it spent the rest of the war on night defence and intruder missions. Re-equipment with Mosquitoes began in January 1945 and on 21 August 1945 the squadron disbanded, having become the highest scoring night fighter squadron in the RAF.

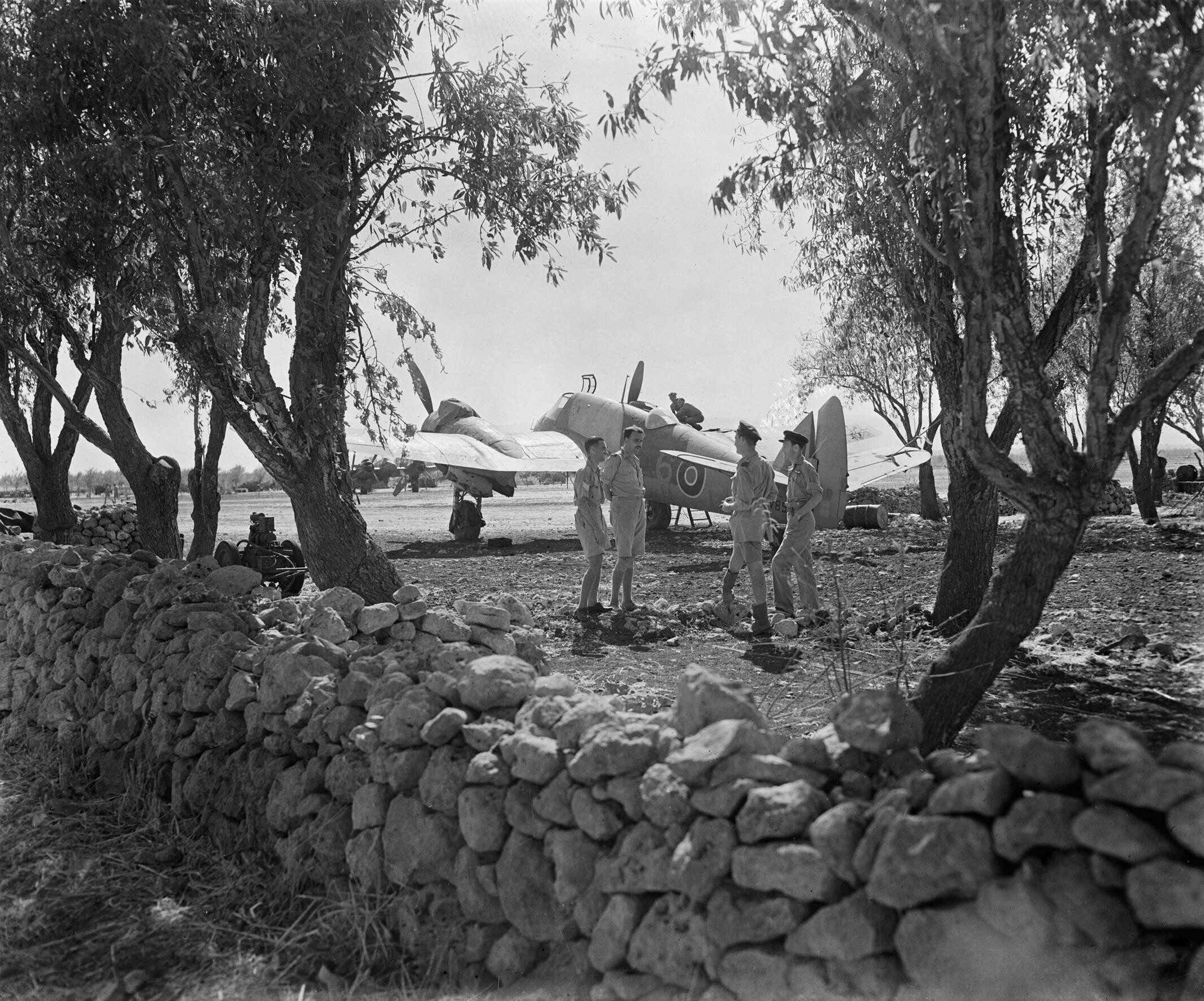
A Bristol Beaufighter of No. 600 Squadron parked up on the airstrip at Cassibile, Sicily

=== Post-war ===
On 10 May 1946, 600 Sqn reformed at RAF Biggin Hill, as a day fighter squadron of the Auxiliary Air Force with Spitfires. It began to recruit during June and received its first operational aircraft in October. After receiving a De Havilland Vampire in October 1949 for jet conversion, it was allotted Meteors in March 1950 and flew these until the Royal Auxiliary Air Force disbanded this squadron and many others on 10 March 1957.

== Present ==
Since 1999, the Squadron has provided initial and professional training to part-time reservists in a variety of RAF ground trades – Operations, Intelligence, Personnel Support, Nursing, Medical & Logistics among others. Many 600 Squadron reservists have had the privilege of literally making the headlines – from exercises in Africa, the Middle East and Malaysia, to front-line operations in Iraq, Afghanistan the Falklands and further afield. More recently, reservists mobilised from their civilian lives to assist in the planning, and on the front-lines of the response to the global pandemic.

In the UK, Reservists from 600 Squadron have served on RAF stations, flying squadrons, at HQ Air Command, in joint operations rooms, with RAF Regiment Squadrons and in posts within the Ministry of Defence. Indistinguishable from full-time colleagues, part-time personnel have led change and success in the traditions of the unit, often gaining awards and commendations – or transferring into successful RAF Regular careers.

Meanwhile, 600 Squadron is one of just two RAF Reserve squadrons within Greater London, and with “Privileged Regiment Status” within the City of London, is regularly involved in high-profile ceremonial events there, or on the national stage.

600 Squadron still actively seeks to recruit and train motivated men and women who live within a 50-mile radius of RAF Northolt, with or without prior armed forces experience, and who have an interest in supporting the RAF in their spare-time.

== Aircraft operated ==
Aircraft operated by no. 600 Squadron RAF, data from
From	To	Aircraft	Version
October 1925	October 1929	Avro 504	K
October 1925	October 1929	De Havilland DH9	A
August 1929	January 1935	Westland Wapiti	Mk.IIA
August 1929	January 1935	Avro Tutor	
January 1935	May 1937	Hawker Hart	
February 1937	April 1939	Hawker Demon	
January 1939	October 1941	Bristol Blenheim	Mk.IF
November 1939	June 1940	Bristol Blenheim	Mk.IV
September 1940	June 1941	Bristol Beaufighter	Mk.IF
April 1941	April 1942	Bristol Beaufighter	Mk.IIF
March 1942	February 1945	Bristol Beaufighter	Mk.VIF
December 1944	August 1945	de Havilland Mosquito	Mk.XIX
October 1946	November 1947	Supermarine Spitfire	Mk.XIVe
April 1947	November 1950	Supermarine Spitfire	F.21
September 1948	March 1950	Supermarine Spitfire	F.22
March 1950	April 1952	Gloster Meteor	F.4
November 1951	March 1957	Gloster Meteor	F.8

== Commanding officers ==
Officers commanding no. 600 Squadron RAF
From	To	Name
October 1925	1926	W/Cdr. A.W.H. James, MC
1926	1931	S/Ldr. the Hon. F.E. Guest
1931	July 1934	S/Ldr. S.B. Collett
July 1934	June 1937	S/Ldr. P.G. Stewart
June 1937	December 1939	S/Ldr. G.L.S. Dawson – Damer, the Viscount Carlow
December 1939	May 1940	S/Ldr. J.M. Wells
May 1940	September 1940	F/Lt. de B. Clarke
September 1940	November 1940	S/Ldr. H.L. Maxwell, DSO
November 1940	January 1941	S/Ldr. C.A. Pritchard
January 1941	December 1941	W/Cdr. George Stainforth, AFC
December 1941	May 1942	W/Cdr. H.M. Pearson, DFC
May 1942	November 1942	W/Cdr. A.G. Miller, DFC, Order of Lenin
November 1942	December 1942	W/Cdr. J.R. Watson
December 1942	March 1944	W/Cdr. Patrick Green, DSO, DFC
March 1944	December 1944	W/Cdr. L.H. Styles, DFC
December 1944	August 1945	W/Cdr. A.H. Drummond
July 1946	July 1948	S/Ldr. T.N. Hayes, DFC
July 1948	August 1950	S/Ldr. D.E. Proudlove
August 1950	October 1953	S/Ldr. J.P. Meadows, DFC, AFC
October 1953	March 1957	S/Ldr. J. McCormack, AFC

== Honorary air commodores ==
Honorary Air Commodores of No. 600 Squadron RAF
From	To	Name
1931	1937	The Rt Hon Frederick Guest
1937	1941	George Lloyd, 1st Baron Lloyd
1942	1949	Sir Archibald Sinclair
1949	1957	The Queen (The Queen Mother from 1952)
1999	2002	Queen Elizabeth the Queen Mother
2006	present	Hugh Trenchard, 3rd Viscount Trenchard

== Squadron bases ==
Bases and airfields used by no. 600 Squadron RAF
From	To	Base	Remark
14 October 1925	18 January 1927	RAF Northolt, Middlesex	
18 January 1927	1 October 1938	RAF Hendon, Middlesex	
1 October 1938	3 October 1938	RAF Kenley, Surrey	
3 October 1938	25 August 1939	RAF Hendon, Middlesex	
25 August 1939	2 October 1939	RAF Northolt, Middlesex	
2 October 1939	16 October 1939	RAF Hornchurch, Essex	Det. at RAF Manston, Kent
16 October 1939	20 October 1939	RAF Rochford, Essex	
20 October 1939	27 December 1939	RAF Hornchurch, Essex	
27 December 1939	16 May 1940	RAF Manston, Kent	
16 May 1940	20 June 1940	RAF Northolt, Middlesex	
20 June 1940	22 August 1940	RAF Manston, Kent	
22 August 1940	12 September 1940	RAF Hornchurch, Essex	
12 September 1940	12 October 1940	RAF Redhill, Surrey	
12 October 1940	14 March 1941	RAF Catterick, North Yorkshire	Dets. at RAF Drem, East Lothian, Scotland; RAF Acklington, Northumberland and RAF Prestwick, Ayrshire
14 March 1941	27 April 1941	RAF Drem, East Lothian, Scotland	Det. at RAF Prestwick, Ayrshire
27 April 1941	18 June 1941	RAF Colerne, Wiltshire	
18 June 1941	27 June 1941	RAF Fairwood Common, Gower, Wales	Det. at RAF Predannack, Cornwall
27 June 1941	6 October 1941	RAF Colerne, Wiltshire	Det. at RAF Predannack, Cornwall
6 October 1941	2 September 1942	RAF Predannack, Cornwall	
2 September 1942	14 November 1942	RAF Church Fenton, North Yorkshire	
14 November 1942	18 November 1942	RAF Portreath, Cornwall	
18 November 1942	7 December 1942	RAF Blida, Algeria	
7 December 1942	3 January 1943	RAF Maison Blanche, Algeria	
3 January 1943	25 June 1943	Setif, Algeria	Dets. at Souk-el-Khemis; 'Paddington'. Tunisia; Bone, Tunisia; RAF Tingley, Algeria and Monastir, Tunisia
25 June 1943	26 July 1943	RAF Luqa, Malta	
26 July 1943	30 September 1943	Cassibile (Sicily), Italy	
30 September 1943	2 February 1944	Montecorvino Airfield, Italy	Dets. at Brindisi, Tortorella, Gaudo and Lago, all Italy
2 February 1944	22 March 1944	Marcianise, Italy	
22 March 1944	1 April 1944	Pomigliano, Italy	
1 April 1944	13 June 1944	Marcianise, Italy	
13 June 1944	19 June 1944	La Banca, Italy	
19 June 1944	5 July 1944	Voltone, Italy	
5 July 1944	29 July 1944	Follonica, Italy	
29 July 1944	25 August 1944	Rosignano, Italy	Det. at Falconara, Italy
25 August 1944	15 December 1944	Falconara, Italy	Dets. at Rosignano, Iesi and Bellaria, all in Italy
15 December 1944	24 May 1945	Cesenatico, Italy	
24 May 1945	26 July 1945	Campoformido, Italy	
26 July 1945	21 August 1945	Aviano, Italy	
10 May 1946	10 March 1957	RAF Biggin Hill	
