= Dirce Repossi =

Italian jewellery company

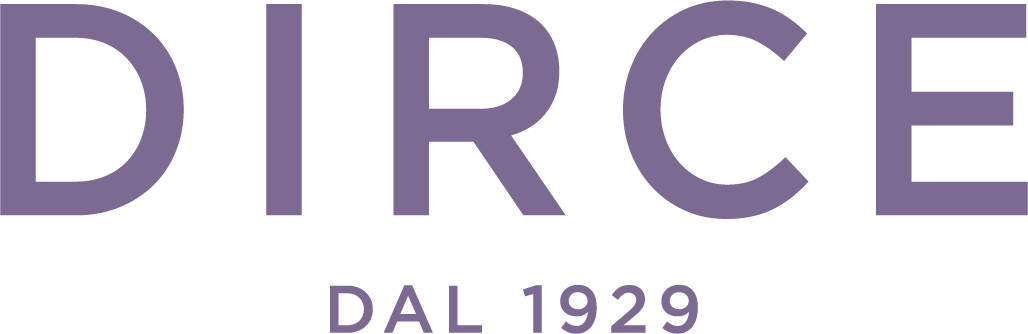
- Industry: Jewellery company
- Founded: Valenza (1929; 97 years ago)
- Founder: Camillo Repossi and Gusto Zeme
- Headquarters: Valenza, Italy
- Key people: Vittoria Verderio Repossi, Dirce Repossi, Camillo Repossi
- Products: Jewellery
- Owner: Jeremy Pession
- Website: dircerepossi.com

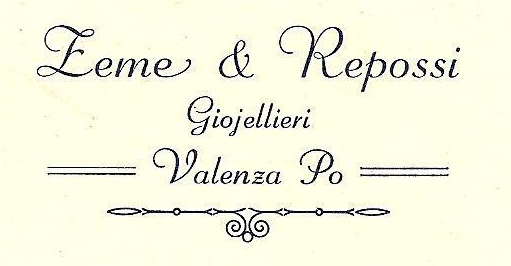
Trademark of Zeme Repossi between 1929 & 1960

Dirce Repossi (originally known as Zeme Repossi) is an Italian jewellery brand founded in 1929, during the Art Déco era, by Camillo Repossi and Giusto Zeme.

In 1961, Dirce Repossi, daughter of Camillo, inherited the family business and subsequently established the eponymous brand. The company later passed to Dirce's daughter, Vittoria Verderio Repossi, who took ownership until her death in 2020, whereupon the company was bequeathed to her son Jeremy Pession, a graduate of the Polytechnic University of Turin.

== Inspiration ==
Dirce Repossi was established during the Art Deco period (1920s-30s), and their first collections drew inspiration from this era's design and aesthetic sensibilities.

The aftermath of World War I saw a period of creative energy and celebration of life, known as the Art Deco Movement. This period of influence had a profound impact on architecture and consumer products, reaching many European nations.

Notable French artists such as Jean Després, Gérard Sandoz, Jean Fouquet, Raymond Templier provided pieces to renowned jewellery companies Cartier and Van Cleef and Arpels. Whilst Italy adopted the national motto of ‘Vivere e dimenticare il passato’ (‘live and forget the past’) which became emblematic of the widespread movement and mood during this period.

Dirce Repossi was among the many brands influenced by this movement, playing with the modern reappraisal of classic styles, experimenting with colour, light, shape and dimension, to produce captivating pieces of jewellery that evoke an enduring style.

== Story ==
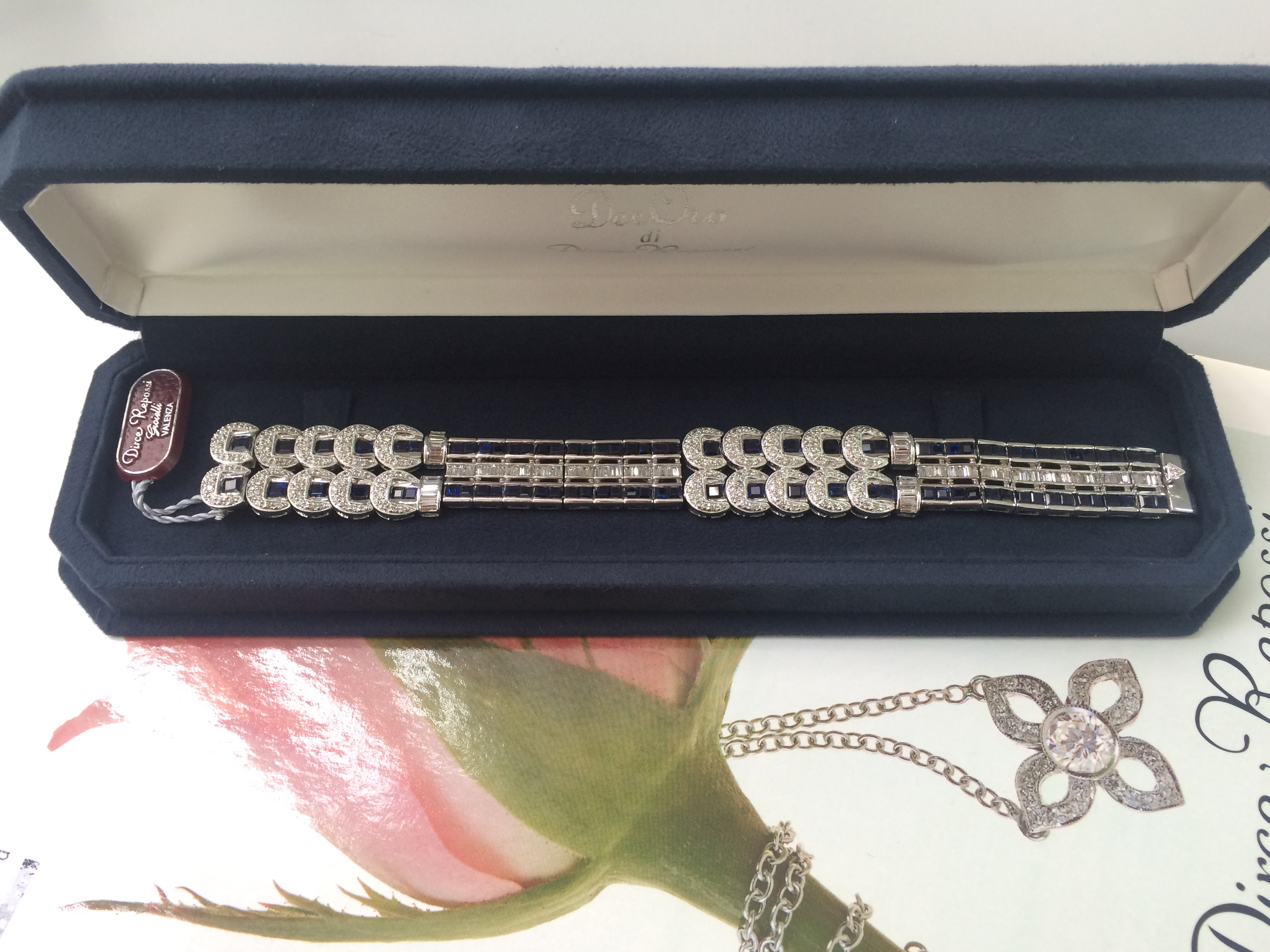
Dirce Repossi Diamond and Sapphire bracelet in Platinum (1992), owned by a private collector

1929: Inspiration from the Art Déco movement lead to the founding of Zeme Repossi, a brand co-founded by Camillo Repossi and Giusto Zeme with the 92 AL hallmark in Valenza, a city known for having highest number of artisan goldsmiths in Italy. They both have great passion in Jewelry and watches.

1930s: The 1925 Paris Exposition Internationale Des Arts Décoratifs et Industriels Modernes, with its avant-garde ideas and imagery inspired from machinery and modernisation, particularly inspired Camillo Repossi and Giusto Zeme in their early creations.

1940s: During World War II, long conflict in Europe jewelry production came to a stop in Italy due to the prohibition to work precious metal during those times and the harshness the population was facing. Still, there are some sketches dated back at this time belonging to Camillo Repossi, secretly designing Beauty despite the constraint of the time.

1951: Camillo Repossi dies, and his daughter Dirce took over his legacy, continuing the family business with her father's partner Giusto Zeme.

1961: 32 years after the birth of the brand, Zeme retires and leaves the company to Dirce. The company was renamed Dirce Repossi, with the 1065 AL hallmark. Classical and timeless creation were crafted since then.

1983: Vittoria Verderio Repossi, Dirce's daughter, graduate GIA Jewelry Designer in Santa Monica joins the company.

1990: Dirce Repossi collaborates with the Italian painter and sculptor Salvatore Fiume, for the charity initiative Un Gioiello Per la Vita with Sotheby's, promoted by AISM Associazione Italiana Sclerosi Multipla.

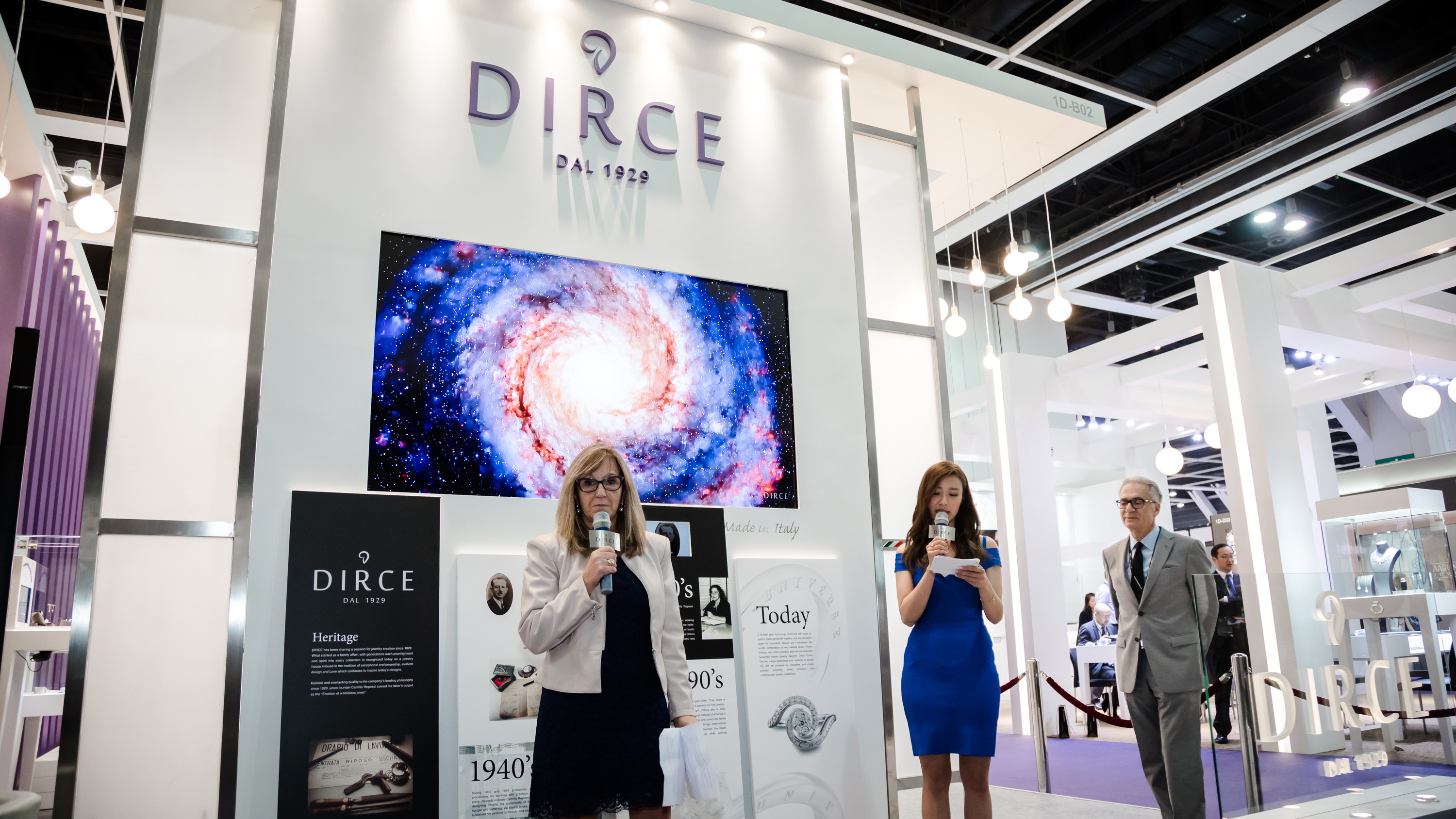
Dirce Asia-Pacific Launch at 2018 Hong Kong International Jewellery Show

1996: The company receives the S. Eligio Award from the city of Valenza.

2005-2006: The brand wins second place at the Tahitian Pearl Trophy with its original design ring “Aconcagua”.

2008: Dirce Repossi dies and leaves the company to her daughter Vittoria currently living in Valenza (Italy). She continues the family business and tradition, implementing the international development.

2016: Relaunch of Dirce Repossi, with new bridal and fashion jewelry collection. Relaunch of the new company image with the new logo.

2018: Dirce announced its "You Are My Universe" jewelry collection in New York & Hong Kong. The collection was designed exclusively for Dirce by Omar Torres, each style is inspired by the infinity of the universe and features a swirling spiral motif to symbolize everlasting love.

2019: Celebrating Dirce ninetieth anniversary announced its "You Are My Universe" in mainland China.

== Craftsmanship and Expertise ==
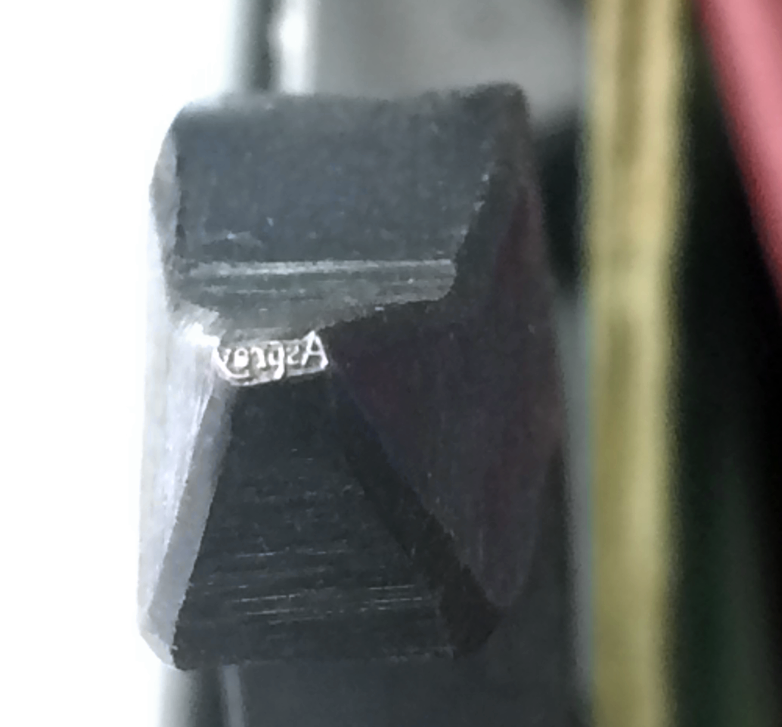
Asprey and Garrard Hallmark face view

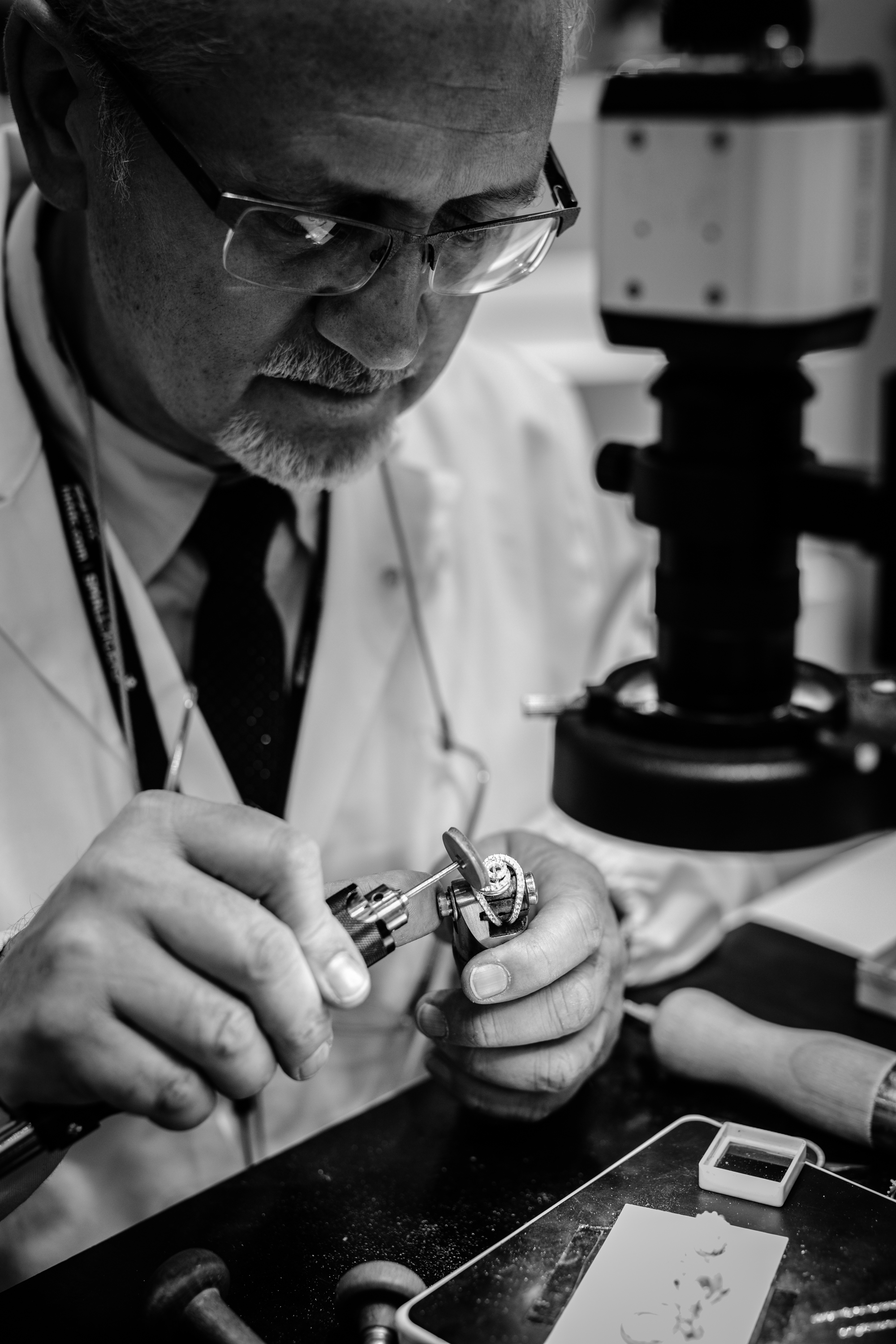
Italian Gem-setter Polishing Metal of an Andromeda Brillante ring

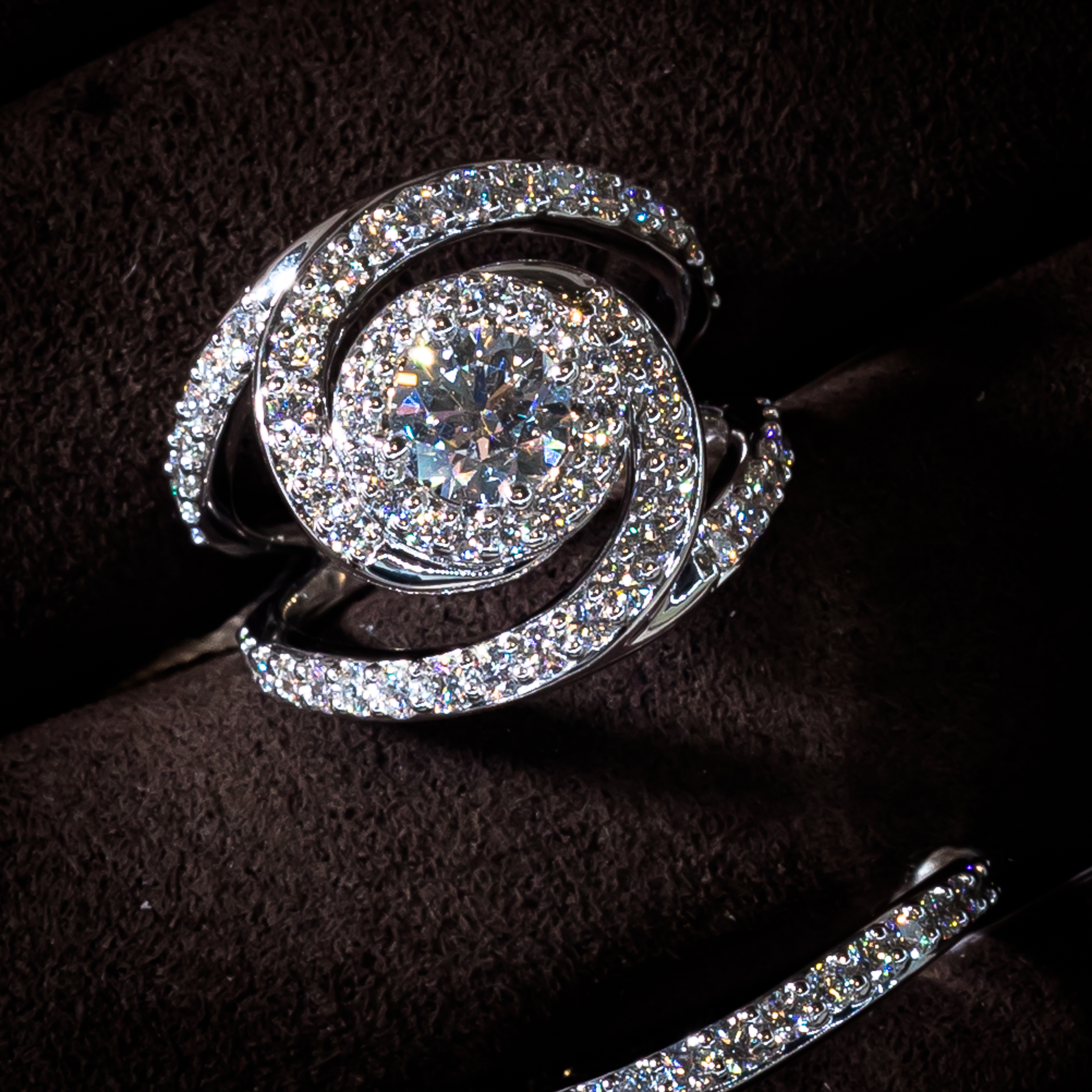
The Andromeda Brillante ring set with pavé set diamonds throughout its design as well as a small hidden diamond beneath the center stone (2019)

Dirce Repossi's has its own workshop, in which the company's jewelry is created. One of the world-famous British Jewelry Asprey and Garrard was collaborating with Dirce Repossi's workshop.

In the late 1930s, many of the young goldsmiths who now have their own jewelry learned and were trained at the Zeme Repossi workshop. The Foral Institute in Valenza, (where the goldsmiths, setters, gem cutters and jewelry designers are trained) has honored the memory of Zeme/Repossi by naming the H classroom with the company name.

Dirce Repossi historical archive conserves, through a dated system of Certification, the story and registration of each Dirce Repossi creation.

Every Dirce Repossi creation is accompanied by its certificate of authenticity issued by the company, stating the specifics of the jewelry such as characteristics of the central stone, the metal, the style and the collection it belongs to.
