= Penne =

Type of pasta

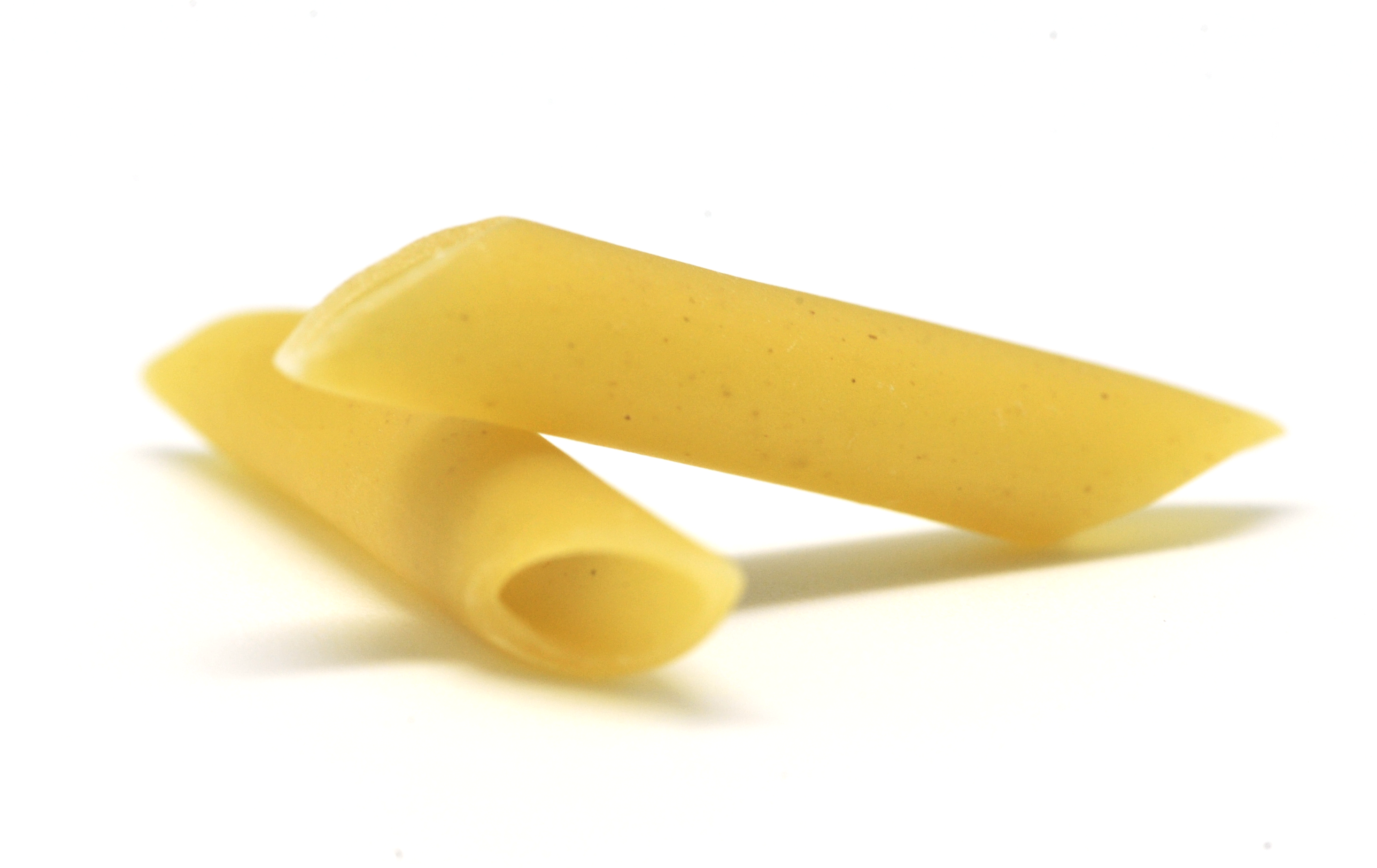
- Penne lisce with a smooth surface
- Type: Pasta
- Place of origin: Italy
- Main ingredients: Durum
- Variations: Penne lisce, penne rigate, pennoni, mostaccioli

Penne (Italian: [ˈpenne]) are an extruded type of pasta in the shape of tubular pieces with ends cut at an angle. They are usually made from wheat flour.

== Etymology ==
Penne is the plural form of the Italian penna 'feather, pen', from Latin penna 'feather, quill', and is a cognate of the English "pen". When this shape was created, it was intended to imitate the then-ubiquitous steel nib of fountain and dip pens.

== Origins ==
Penne are one of the few pasta shapes with a certain date of birth: in 1865, Giovanni Battista Capurro, a pasta maker from San Martino d'Albaro (Genoa), obtained a patent for a diagonal cutting machine. His invention cut the fresh pasta into a pen shape without crushing it, in sizes from 3 cm (1 in) mezze penne 'half pens' to 5 cm (2 in) penne 'pens'.

== Description and variations ==
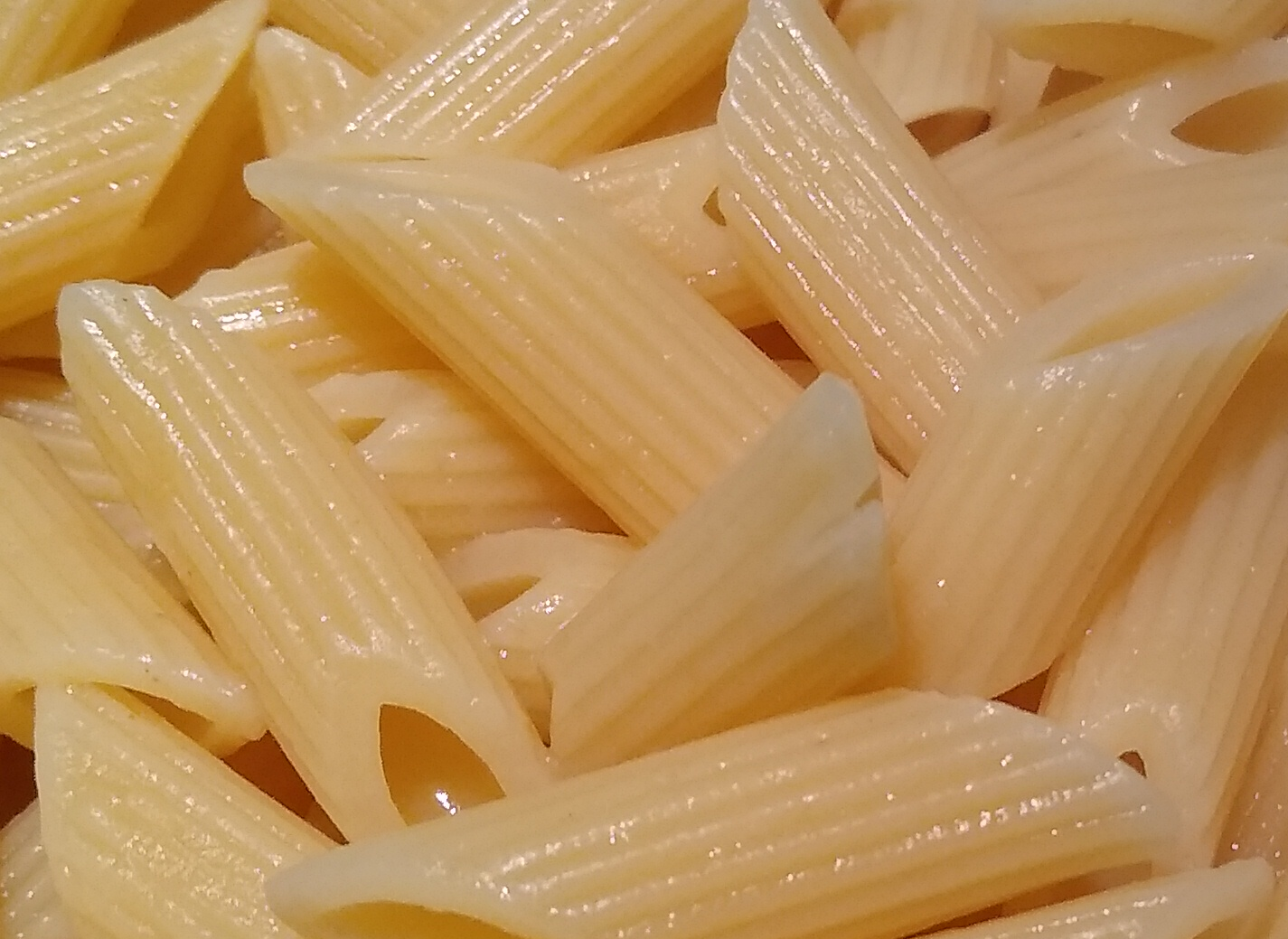
Cooked mezze penne rigate, showing its ridged surface

In Italy, penne are produced in two main variants: penne lisce 'smooth' and penne rigate 'ridged', with grooves running along their length. Pennoni are a wider version of penne. In English-language contexts, a version is called mostaccioli ("little moustaches") by various manufacturers, which may be either smooth or ridged in texture.

== Dishes ==
Penne are usually cooked al dente and their shape makes them particularly adapted for sauces, such as pesto, marinara or arrabbiata. Penne all'arrabiata feature in several Italian films, including Marco Ferreri's La Grande Bouffe (1973) and Federico Fellini's Roma (1972).

=== Penne alla Salvatore Fiume ===
According to Vincenzo Buonassisi, Salvatore Fiume won a writer's cooking contest in Gardone with a baked penne rigate dish resembling the national flag of Italy which was later named Penne alla Salvatore Fiume. The dish features butter, olive oil, crushed tomatoes, oregano, parmesan, mozzarella, and basil.

== See also ==
Media related to Penne (pasta) at Wikimedia Commons

- Cuisine of Liguria
- List of pasta
