= El Bouni District =

- District
- Country: Algeria
- Province: Annaba Province
- County seat: El Bouni

Area
  - Total: 36 sq mi (93 km^{2})

Population (2008)
  - Total: 125,265
  - Density: 3,490/sq mi (1,347/km^{2})
- Time zone: UTC+1 (CET)

The El Bouni district is an Algerian administrative district in the Annaba province. Its chief town is located on the eponymous town of El Bouni.

== Communes ==
The daira is composed of only one commune: El Bouni.
