= Nicola Saggio =

Italian Roman Catholic saint

Saint Nicola Saggio O.M.
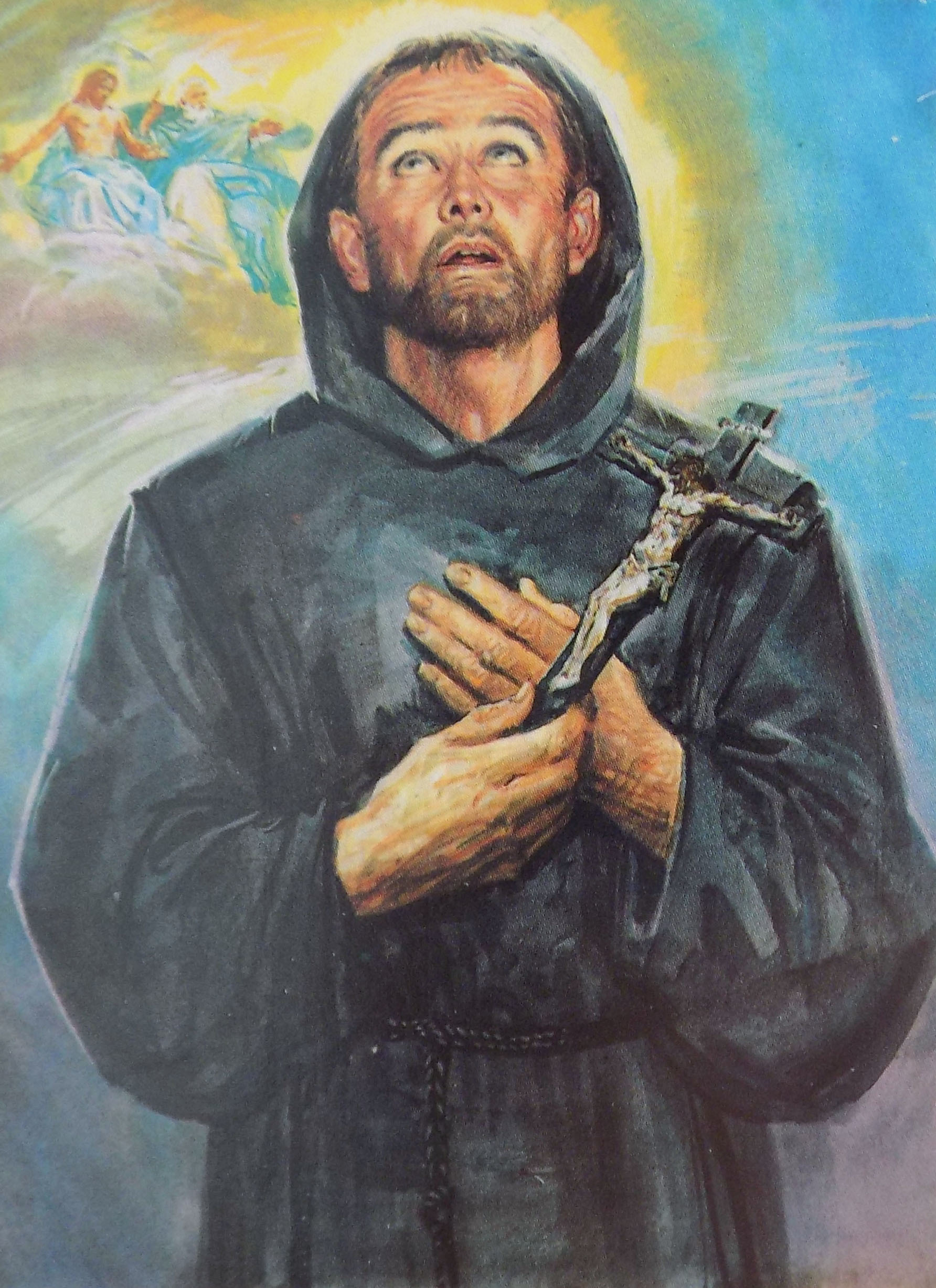

Religious
- Born: 6 January 1650; Longobardi, Calabria, Italy
- Died: 3 February 1709 (aged 59); Rome, Lazio, Papal States
- Venerated in: Roman Catholic Church
- Beatified: 17 September 1786, Saint Peter's Basilica, Papal States by Pope Pius VI
- Canonized: 23 November 2014, Saint Peter's Square, Vatican City by Pope Francis
- Feast: 2 February
- Attributes: Crucifix; Minim habit
- Patronage: Longobardi

Nicola Saggio was an Italian Roman Catholic professed oblate of the Order of Minims.

He was beatified on 17 September 1786 and was canonized as a saint of the Roman Catholic Church on 23 November 2014.

== Life ==
Nicola Saggio was born on 6 January 1650 in Longobardi, a small town on the Tyrrhenian coast. His parents were Fulvio Saggio, a farmer, and Aurelia Saggio née Pizzini. He was the first of five children. He was baptized "Giovanni Battista Clemente" on 10 January 1650.

His parents raised him with high moral and spiritual values. He worked in the fields, his parents not having the means to pay for his studies. Giovanni visited the convent of the Minims which made him desire the religious life as his path in life. Despite his parents' opposition, he joined the Franciscan Minims at the Paola monastery, taking the name "Nicolas".

He served at San Marco Argentano, Montalto and Cosenza, before being recalled to Paola to be secretary to the provincial. In 1681 he was sent to San Francesco di Paola ai Monti in Rome to assist the parish priest and act as doorkeeper.

A further change in his spiritual life was recorded in 1683 after a pilgrimage on foot to Loreto to ask God – through the intercession of the Blessed Virgin Mary – for the liberation of Vienna from the Turks. He returned to Longobardi in 1694.

He died of pleurisy in Rome 3 February 1709.

== Sainthood ==
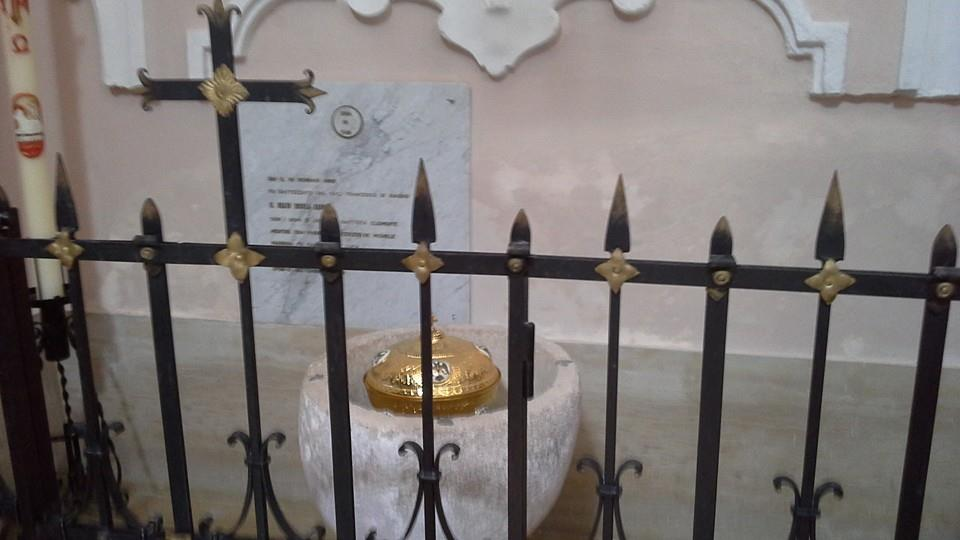
The baptismal font where St. Nicola Saggio was baptized.

On 17 March 1771 he was made Venerable once Pope Clement XIV confirmed his life of heroic virtue. Pope Pius VI presided over the rite of beatification for the late oblate on 17 September 1786 in Saint Peter's Basilica after approving two miracles attributed to his intercession. After the beatification he was made the patron of Longobardi (his village).

The third and final miracle for the canonization occurred in 1938 for a mason of Longobardi who fell from a scaffold without sustaining injuries. The diocesan investigation took place between 24 May 2008 and 15 June 2009; the process received the validation of the Congregation for the Causes of Saints on 11 March 2011 while the consulting medical board approved the miracle on 13 December 2012. Theologians voiced approval on 28 November 2013 while the C.C.S. also assented on 4 March 2014. Pope Francis canonized him as a saint on 23 November 2014 in Saint Peter's Square after approving the miracle on 3 April 2014. The postulator at the time of the canonization was the Rev. Ottavio Laino.

Nicola Saggio's relics are in the Church of San Francesco di Paola ai Monti in Rome.
