= Salvatore Fiume =

Italian painter (1915–1997)

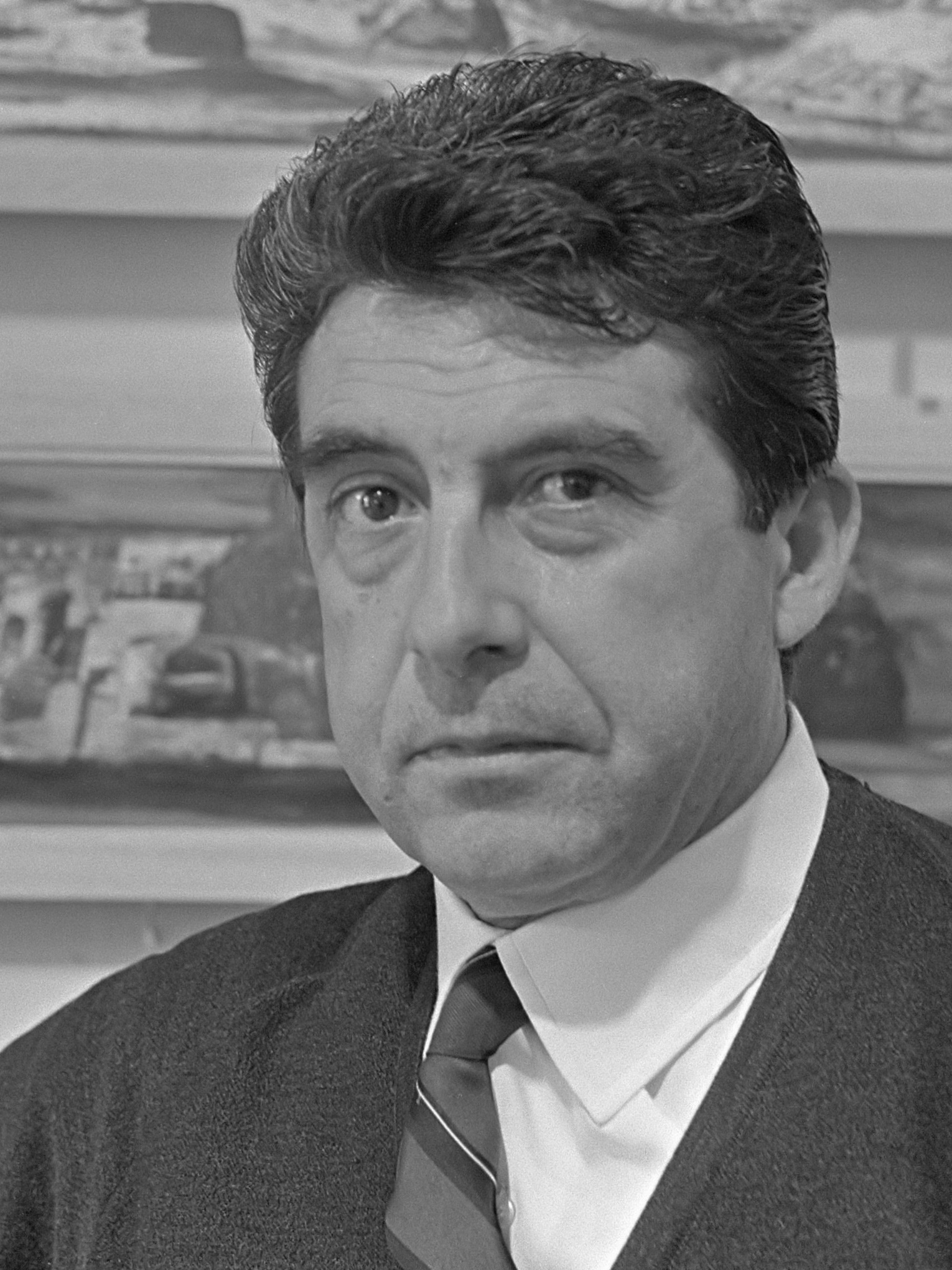
- Salvatore Fiume
- Born: 23 October 1915; Comiso, Sicily, Italy
- Died: 3 June 1997 (aged 81); Canzo, Lombardy, Italy
- Occupations: Painter; sculptor; architect; writer; stage designer

Salvatore Fiume (23 October 1915 – 3 June 1997) was an Italian painter, sculptor, architect, writer and stage designer. His works are kept in some of the most important museums in the world, among which the Vatican Museums, the Hermitage of Saint Petersburg, the Museum of Modern Art of New York City, the Pushkin Museum of Moscow and the Galleria d'Arte Moderna of Milan.

== Biography ==
Salvatore Fiume was born in Comiso, Sicily, in 1915. At the age of sixteen, thanks to his enthusiasm and his passion for art, he won a scholarship to attend the Royal Institute for Book Illustration at Urbino, where he mastered printing techniques from etching to lithography. He ended his studies at the age of twenty-one and moved to Milan, where he came into contact with intellectuals and artists such as Salvatore Quasimodo, Dino Buzzati and Raffaele Carrieri. In 1938, at the age of twenty-three, Fiume moved to Ivrea, where he became art director of Tecnica e organizzazione (Technique and Organization), a cultural magazine sponsored and overseen by Adriano Olivetti; during this time, he wrote his first successful literary work, the novel Viva Gioconda!, published in Milan in 1943 by editor Bianchi-Giovini.

Although the literary circle he attended was stimulating, he wanted to devote himself more to painting, and in 1946 he left Ivrea to settle in a 19th-century silk mill in Canzo, not far away from Como, where he began an intense and versatile search for pictorial, sculptural and architectural expression. In the same year, in Milan, a set of drawings in tempera and Indian ink was shown to the art critic Raffaele Carrieri and to the painter and writer Alberto Savinio, brother of the metaphysical painter Giorgio de Chirico, who was thrilled.

In 1949 he held his first official exhibition, which included Isole di statue and Città di statue, at the Galleria Borromini in Milan. It aroused much interest among the critics and resulted in him coming into touch with international cultural and artistic institutions; here works of the painter were bought both by the New York City Museum of Modern Art's director, Alfred H. Barr Jr., in order to display it in his museum, as well as by the Jucker collection of Milan. The next year, 1950, he was invited to the Venice Biennale to exhibit his triptych Isola di statue, which earned him a cover on Life.

In the same year he was invited by the architect Gio Ponti to create a large work of 48×3 metres which would be installed in the first class hall of the Andrea Doria, a famous and elegant ocean liner sunk in 1956 off Nantucket, Massachusetts. The big canvas, entitled Le leggende d'Italia, represented an imaginary Renaissance city rich in Italian masterpieces of 15th and 16th century.

In 1949 he was already working on a cycle of ten large paintings, commissioned by the industrialist Bruno Buitoni, Sr., entitled Le avventure, le sventure e le glorie dell'antica Perugia, which he finished in 1952; Fiume's interest in Renaissance painting, particularly in Piero della Francesca and Paolo Uccello can be inferred from these works. In 1953, the New York magazines Life and Time commissioned him to do some works depicting an imaginary story of Manhattan and New York Bay, envisioned by the painter as statue islands.

A period of contacts, travels and exhibitions around the world began. These travels were very important for Fiume because they helped him gather impressions, sounds, forms and colours of ancient and modern cultures, which increased his artistic personality, providing him the material for a global set of images, but always disciplined by the preponderance of the Mediterranean classical harmony.

In 1962, a hundred pictures of Fiume's toured through several German museums, including those of Cologne and Regensburg. In 1973, the artist went to the Babile valley, in Ethiopia, together with his friend, the photographer Walter Mori, where he painted a group of rocks with anticorrosive paints. A full-scale model of a section of these rock was made by Fiume for the big anthological exhibition of 1974 at the Palazzo Reale of Milan; this model covered almost all of the big Cariatidi Room. At the same exhibition, the Gioconda Africana, now kept by the Vatican Museums, was displayed for the first time. In 1975, the Calabrian village of Fiumefreddo Bruzio accepted Fiume's proposal to beautify the historical centre with some of his works for free. Between 1975 and 1976, the artist painted several walls of the ancient tumble-down castle, and, in 1977, the cupola of the San Rocco chapel. In the 1990s he erected a bronze sculpture in each of the squares of Fiumefreddo with a panoramic view of the sea.

Several exhibitions followed: in 1985 at Castel Sant'Angelo of Rome; in 1987 the De Architectura Pingendi exhibition at the Sporting d'Hiver of Monte Carlo inaugurated by prince Rainier of Monaco; in 1991 at the Mostra internazionale di architettura in Milan, at the Palazzo delle Esposizioni; in 1992 at Villa Medici, seat of Académie de France in Rome. In 1993 Fiume visited the places where Gauguin had lived in Polynesia; he also donated one of his paintings to the Gauguin Museum of Tahiti, in homage to the great French master.

As a theatrical stage designer, from 1950 to 1960, he was prominent at the Teatro alla Scala of Milan (sets and costumes for La vita breve of Manuel de Falla), at the Covent Garden of London, at the Teatro dell'opera of Rome and at the Teatro Massimo of Palermo.

As a writer, besides Viva Gioconda! in 1943, he published several novels, many short stories, a comedy, a tragedy and two collections of poems. In particular, his 1994 book entitled Pagine libere ("Free Pages"), three years before his death, presents very personal remarks about life and art. In 1988, his activity as a storyteller, poet and playwright earned him an honorary degree in Modern Letters from the University of Palermo.

As a painter, Fiume has participated in the "Un Gioeillo per la vita" (A Jewel for Life) charity event organized by Errepi Comunicazione in 1990. Fiume's work for the "Un gioiello per la vita" has been produced by Dirce Repossi an Italian Jewellery based in Valenza.

As a sculptor, he made his debut in 1994 with an exhibition for the Galleria Artesanterasmo of Milan, though his beginnings in sculpture in wicker, ceramics, bronze, marble, resin and other materials dates back to the 1940s and the strong plastic-architectural interpretation which recurs also in the pictorial production is undeniable. All the same, a series of previous experiences which saw the creation of marble sculptures by professionals based on Fiume's sketches led the artist to skip the intermediary craftsmen and to carry out his own sculptures, from the sketch to the completed work, himself. So, at the age of seventy nine, Fiume personally created remarkably big sculptures, such as Le tre grazie, from the plasticine model to the final form in painted resin: a considerable commitment which, according to his relatives, contributed to undermine the artist's health. His production includes works in stone, bronze, resin, wood and ceramics, some of which are sizeable, as the bronze statue at the European Parliament of Strasbourg, the stone groups at the San Raffaele hospitals of Milan and Rome and the bronze group for the Wine Fountain in Marsala. Another open-air exhibition of his sculptures was held in 1995 at the Centro Allende in La Spezia.

== Cooking ==
According to Vincenzo Buonassisi Fiume won a writer's cooking contest in Gardone with a baked penne rigate dish resembling the Italian flag which was later named Penne alla Salvatore Fiume. The dish features butter, olive oil, crushed tomatoes, oregano, parmesan, mozzarella, and basil.

== Literary works ==
- W Gioconda! (1943)
- I sogni di Luisa (1983)
- Tragedie Drammi Commedie (1990)
- Scrivo a te donna (1983)
- Pagine libere (1993)
- I miserabili (1994)
- La risata del fauno, (1995)
- Lettere clandestine (1996)
- Antico rogo (1996)
