= El Bouni =

Coordinates: 36°50′20″N 7°39′50″E

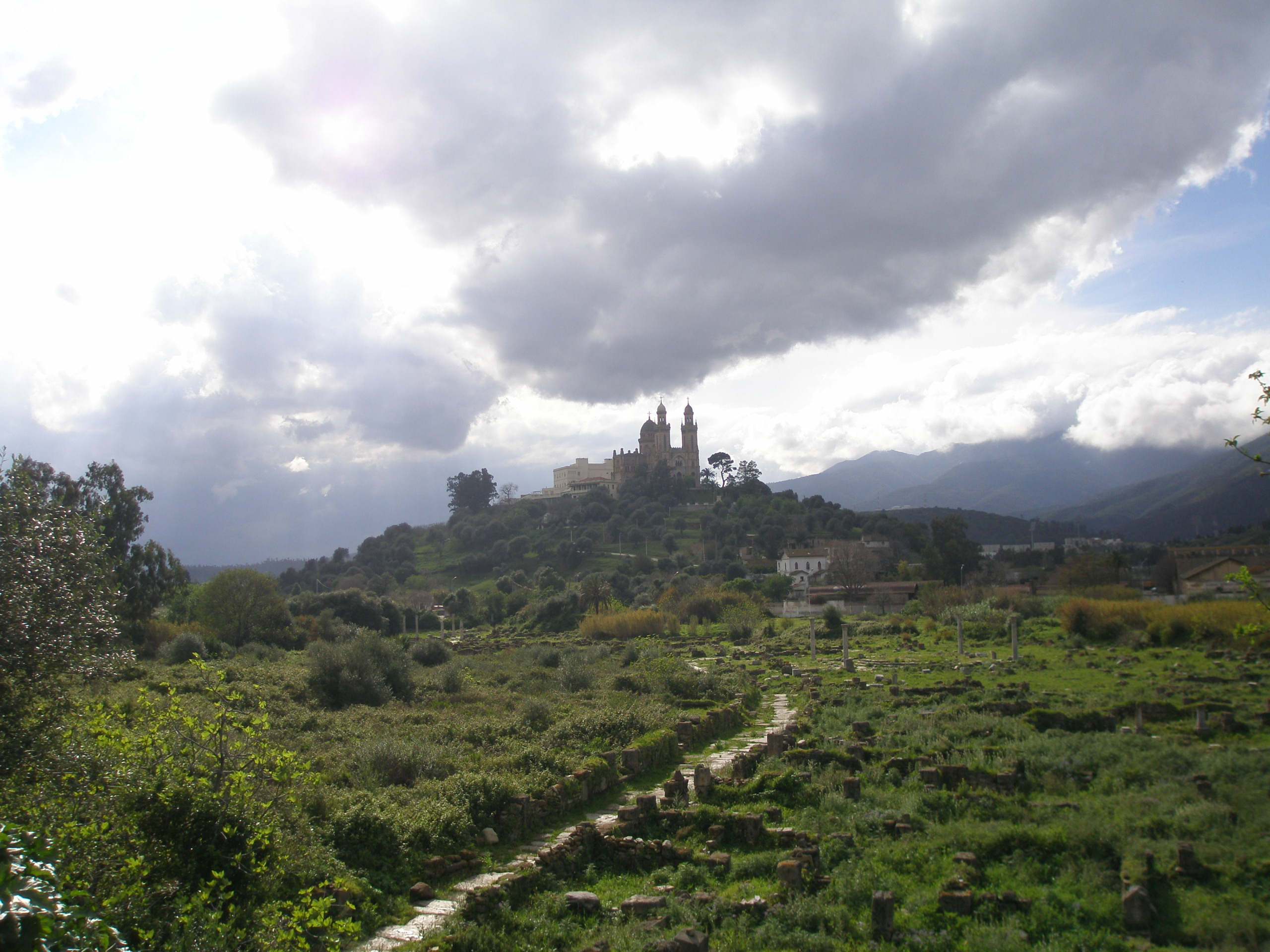

- Country: Algeria
- Province: Annaba
- Time zone: UTC+1 (West Africa Time)

El Bouni is a town in north-eastern Algeria.
