= Longobardi, Calabria =

Longobardi
- Comune
- Comune di Longobardi
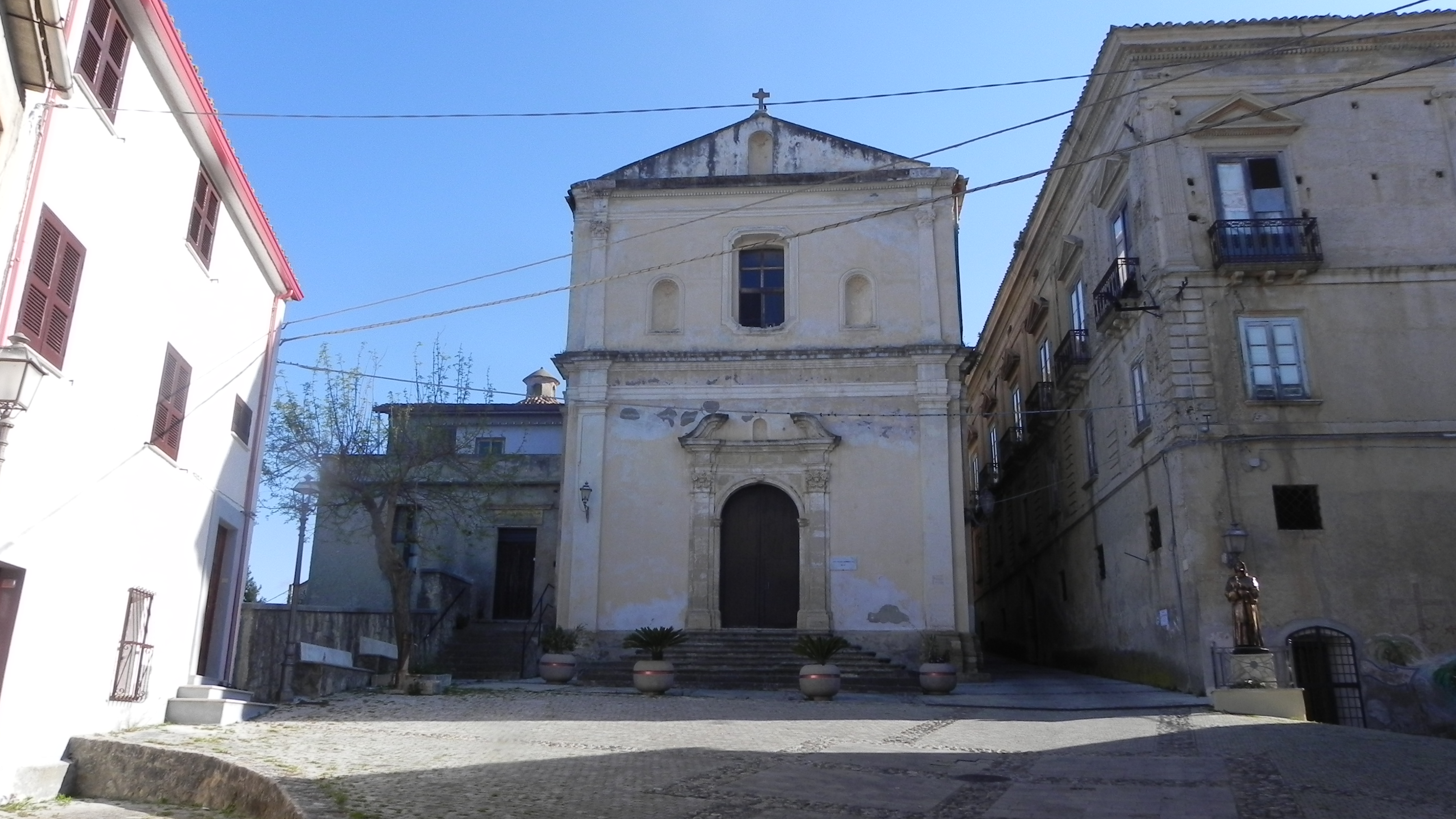
- Church of Santa Domenica

- Location within Italy Location within Calabria
- Coordinates: 39°12′N 16°05′E
- Country: Italy
- Region: Calabria
- Province: Cosenza (CS)

Government
  - Mayor: Giacinto Mannarino

Area
  - Total: 18.24 km^{2} (7.04 sq mi)
- Elevation: 325 m (1,066 ft)

Population (2007)
  - Total: 2,297
  - Density: 125.9/km^{2} (326.2/sq mi)
- Demonym: Longobardesi
- Time zone: UTC+1 (CET)
  - Summer (DST): UTC+2 (CEST)
- Postal code: 87030
- Dialing code: 0982
- Patron saint: Saint Nicola of Longobardi
- Saint day: 3 February
- Website: Official website

Longobardi is a town and comune in the province of Cosenza, part of the Calabria region of southern Italy. It is located between the Tyrrhenian Sea and the Monte Cocuzzo, one of the highest peaks in the area.

Main sights include the church of St. Francis, the Collegiata and the Palazzo Pellegrini with a notable staircase.

== Notable people ==
- Saint Nicola Saggio, Minim, (1650-1709) who was canonized on the 23 November 2014
