= Wladimiro Politano =

Italian sculptor, painter and drawer (born 1940)

- Born: February 19, 1940 (age 86); Lago, Calabria, Italy
- Education: Accademia di Belle Arti di Roma
- Known for: Painting, Drawing, Sculpture
- Spouse: Clementina Di Ruggiero
- Awards: Academia di Belle Arti di Roma; 1966 Mention of Honor – Valencia’s Ateneo. Salon XXIII. Valencia -Venezuela; 1970 Merit Honor "Commendation" – given by the Mayor of New Rochelle. New York. USA. 1980 Lirismo Abstracto Sylvia Daro Dawidowicz International Award – South Florida-USA; 1982 Sculpture Award 85 – Theater Teresa Carreño. Caracas-Venezuela. 1985 ”The Italy in the World Award “ 1998 "Mention of Honor" – Venezuelan Army. Caracas-Venezuela.
- Website: wladimiropolitano.com

Wladimiro Politano (February 19, 1940 Lago (Cosenza), Italy) is an Italian sculptor, painter and drawer. Politano's work has been exhibited in the United States, Latin America and Europe.

== Background ==
Born in Italy, Politano graduated from the Accademia di Belle Arti di Roma. He lived in Rome until 1966, when he moved to Caracas, Venezuela. Seven years later he went to New York where he lived for ten years. During this period of time Politano participated in different public and private exhibitions in the United States, Austria, Japan, Venezuela and Italy.

In 1978, the Vienna Künstlerhaus invited Politano to celebrate the One Hundred Years of the Künstlerhause Museum. In July 1980, the city of New Rochelle N.Y. awarded him the title “Commendatio ”.

In 1981, Politano helped inaugurate the Museum of Modern Art, Toyama Toyama-Shi, Japan. The museum has two Politano paintings are present in permanent exhibition. In Florida, he received the Sylvia Daro Dawidowicz International Award.

In 1983, Politano returns to Caracas to work with both private and public projects. He participated in Caracas to "Escultura Symposium 1985" and his model remained as a symbol of the "VIII Biennale of Architecture" in the "Museo de Bellas Artes" . This sculpture is called "Puntas de Plata" and is in permanent exhibition at the Caracas's Metro, Station "El Silencio”. Politano in this period lived and worked between Venezuela, Italy and Sweden.

In 2003, Politan was invited as a curator and artist to participate in the "II Biennial of Painting" in Konstgall Väsby, Stockholm, Sweden. He was invited to the first International Sculpture Symposium 2007 SIEIM made in 'Margarita Island, Nueva Esparta Venezuela. Politano received "The Italy in the World Award" from the President of Italy.

Today, Politano lives between Caracas, Rome, Lago-Calabria and Stockholm.

== Museum ==
- Künstlerhause Museum of Vienna. Vienna, Austria.
- Museum Bennington College. Bennington. Vermont, USA.
- Museum Modern Art Toyoma. Shingogaura. Toyama-Shi. Japan.
- Sylvia Daro Dawidowicz International Foundation. Florida, USA.
- Metropolitan Museum of Art, Coral Gable. Florida, USA.
- John J. Koubeck Foundation, University of Miami. Florida, USA.
- Museum "Bellas Arte”. Caracas, Venezuela.
- Museum of Contemporary Art Sofia Imber. Caracas, Venezuela.
- Museum of Rende, Municipality of Rende. Rende, Cosenza, Italy.
- Museum of Latin American Art (MOLAA). Long Beach. California, USA.
- Museum of Contemporary Art. Panamá
- Museum of Art Acarigua Araure. MAAA. Acarigua. Edo. Portuguesa, Venezuela

== Awards ==
- Accademia di Belle Arti di Roma. Italia, 1966.
- "Mention of Honor". Valencia's Ateneo. Salon XXIII. Valencia, Venezuela 1970.
- Merit Honor "Commendation", given by the Mayor of New Rochelle. New York. For the Art work "Lirismo Abstracto”. New York, USA. 1980.
- "Sylvia Daro Dawidowicz International Award”. South Florida, USA . 1982.
- Sculpture Award 85, Theater Teresa Carreño. Caracas, Venezuela . 1985.
- ”The Italy in the World Award “. Categories in Painting and Sculpture. Italy Roma-Caracas. 1998.
- "Mention of Honor" Venezuelan Army. Caracas, Venezuela.

== Public project ==
- Art in the Public Squares, Miami, Florida USA 1980.
- Sculpture "Silver Points”. Caracas Metro. Station ‘s Subway "El Silencio”. Caracas, Venezuela. 1990.
- Sculpture "Convergenza dei Contrari". Public Square in Lago. Calabria, Italy. 1994.
- Sculpture "Interatracción" Simposium International of Sculpture in the Margarita' s Island. SIEIM. 2007.

== Selected solo exhibitions ==
- Museum of Art Acarigua Araure. MAAA. "Wladimiro Politano of Oniric Metaphors and Abstract Syntheses". From 4 August until 4 November 2012. Acarigua, Venezuela. 2012
- Museum of Contemporary Art. Panamá. ”Politano. Un maestro italo-venezolano en Panamá". Panamá 2012
- Studio Politano " Politano, Alterities Immaginarie”. Caracas, Venezuela. 2008.
- Art Gallery Il mondo dell'Arte "Palazzo Margutta" Rome, Italia 2004.
- Art Gallery Dimaca. "Politano 1996–1998 ". Caracas, Venezuela 1998.
- Art Gallery Slato. Caracas, Venezuela 1997.
- Metro of Caracas. ”Permanent Exhibition " El Silencio. Caracas, Venezuela. 1993.
- Art Gallery Opere d' Arte. Spazi Pubblici. New York, USA 1992.
- Art Gallery El Mundo del Arte. Maracaibo, Venezuela 1987.
- Art Gallery Sami de Mizraji. Caracas, Venezuela 1981.
- Art Gallery Opera. Caracas, Venezuela 1979.
- Museum Kunstler Haus. Vienna-Austria 1978.
- Art Gallery Clay, Gallery of the year. New York, USA. 1977.
- Inter-American Development Bank, BID Washington D.C., USA 1976.
- Art Gallery Maison Bernard. "Politano" Caracas, Venezuela 1975.
- Art Gallery Maison Bernard. "Politano" Caracas, Venezuela 1974.
- Art Gallery Maison Bernard. "Politano" Caracas, Venezuela 1973.
- Art Gallery Maison Bernard. "Politano" Caracas, Venezuela 1972.
- Art Gallery Sans Souci. Caracas, Venezuela 1971.
- Art Gallery Bellas Artes. Caracas, Venezuela 1970.
- Art Gallery Artex Galeria International. Caracas, Venezuela 1969.
- Art Gallery La Isla, Paintings and Collages. Caracas, Venezuela 1968.
- Art Gallery El Muro, Politano. Caracas, Venezuela 1968.
- Venezuelan American Center. Caracas, Venezuela 1967.
- Palace of the Bruzzi. "Settanta Opere di Scenografia". Cosenza, Calabria Italy 1965.

== Collective Art exhibitions ==
- Gallery Graphicart "36 Años de Geometría”. Caracas, Venezuela. Dic. 2012/March 2013.
- Palazzo Ca’ Zanardi. ”InternationArt in Venice". Venice, Italy. Oct. 2012.
- Swedish Parliament. ”Latin America Art”. Stockholm, Sweden. 2011.
- Palazzo Ca’ Zanardi. ”World Art in Venice". Venice, Italy. 2011.
- Canal Gallery " Temperatura Latina”. Panama. 2011.
- FIA 20 Years "Iberoamerican Art Fair Caracas”. Caracas, Venezuela. 2011.
- Edsvik Konsthall. Stockholm, Sweden 2010.
- Art Gallery Dimaca. Caracas, Venezuela 2010.
- Art Gallery Medici, Caracas, Venezuela 2008.
- VII Biennale of National Art, Puerto la Cruz, Venezuela 2007.
- IV Fair of International Arts and Antique FIAAM, Venezuela 2007.
- I Simposium of Sculpture SIEIM, Island of Margarita, Venezuela 2007.
- Art Gallery Medici, Caracas, Venezuela 2007.
- Museum of Latin American Art, MOLAA, Long Beach, California, USA 2005.
- Art Gallery Joan Gaspar, Madrid, Espana 2005.
- Embassy of Canada, Caracas, Venezuela 2004.
- City Hall, Cosenza, Italy 2004.
- Edsvik Konsthall, Stockholm, Sweden 2004.
- Fair FIAAM, Maracaibo, Venezuela 2004.
- Vasby Konsthall, Stockholm, Sweden 2003.
- Art Gallery Dimaca. Caracas, Venezuela 2000.
- Art Gallery Slato. Caracas, Venezuela 1999.
- Art Gallery Slato. Caracas, Venezuela 1997.
- Art Gallery Slato. Caracas, Venezuela 1996.
- Art Gallery Uno. Caracas, Venezuela 1995.
- Art Gallery Theo. Madrid, Spain. 1991.
- Art Gallery Freites. Caracas, Venezuela 1990.
- Museum of Bellas Artes. Caracas, Venezuela 1987.
- Virginia Miller Art Gallery, Coral Gables, Florida, USA 1986.
- Art Biennale, Barquisimeto, Venezuela 1985.
- Cultural Center of Caracas. Teatro Teresa Carreño, Venezuela 1985
- FUNDARTE, Municipal Council and Government of the Federal District. Caracas, Venezuela 1985.
- Rotary Club International, New York, USA 1984.
- Art in public square, Miami, USA 1983.
- City Bank, Private Collection, Caracas, Venezuela 1983.
- Metropolitan Museum "International Masters" Coral Gables, Florida, USA 1983.
- Sala Mendoza, Caracas, Venezuela 1983.
- Art Space Gallery, Coral Gables, Florida, USA 1983.
- John and Koubeck Foundation, University of Miami, USA 1983.
- Sylvia Daro Dawidowicz International Foundation, Florida USA 1982.
- Viridiam Art Gallery, New York, USA 1982.
- Virginia Miller Art Gallery, Coral Gables, Florida, USA 1982.
- Art Foundation Concordia University. Concordia, USA 1981.
- Harmonie Club Foundation New York, USA 1980.
- Cultural Center of Art New Rochelle, New York, USA 1980.
- Elizabeth Weiner Art Gallery, New York, USA 1980.
- Clay Art Gallery, New York, USA 1977.
- David Finlay Art Gallery, New York, USA 1976.
- Randall Art Gallery, New York, USA 1976.
- XXIII Salon Arturo Michelena, Valencia, Venezuela 1970.
- Academy of Belle Arti di Roma, Italy 1965.

== Public & Private collections ==
- Federal Bank. Mezerhane Group. Venezuela, Caracas.
- Private Collection Carlos Van Stuijvenberg. Caracas, Venezuela
- Museum of Latin American Art MOLAA, Long Beach, California. USA.
- Museum of Rende, Cosenza, Calabria, Italy.
- Museum Of Contemporary Art Sofia Imber, Caracas, Venezuela.
- Art Biennale, Island Of Margarita, Venezuela.
- Rotary Club, New York, USA. City Bank,
- Private Collection, Miami, USA.
- Eugenio Mendoza Foundation, Caracas, Venezuela.
- University of Miami, Coral Gables, USA.
- Metropolitan Museum of Art Miami, USA.
- Cultural Center New Rochelle, New York, USA.
- Bennington College, Vermont, USA.
- Kunstlerhaus Museum, Vienna, Austria.
- Inter American Development Bank, Washington D.C., USA.
- Salon Arturo Michelena, Valencia Venezuela. Venezuela
- American Center, Caracas, Venezuela.
- Palazzo Bruzzi, Cosenza, Italy.
