= Monte Cocuzzo =

Mountain in Italy

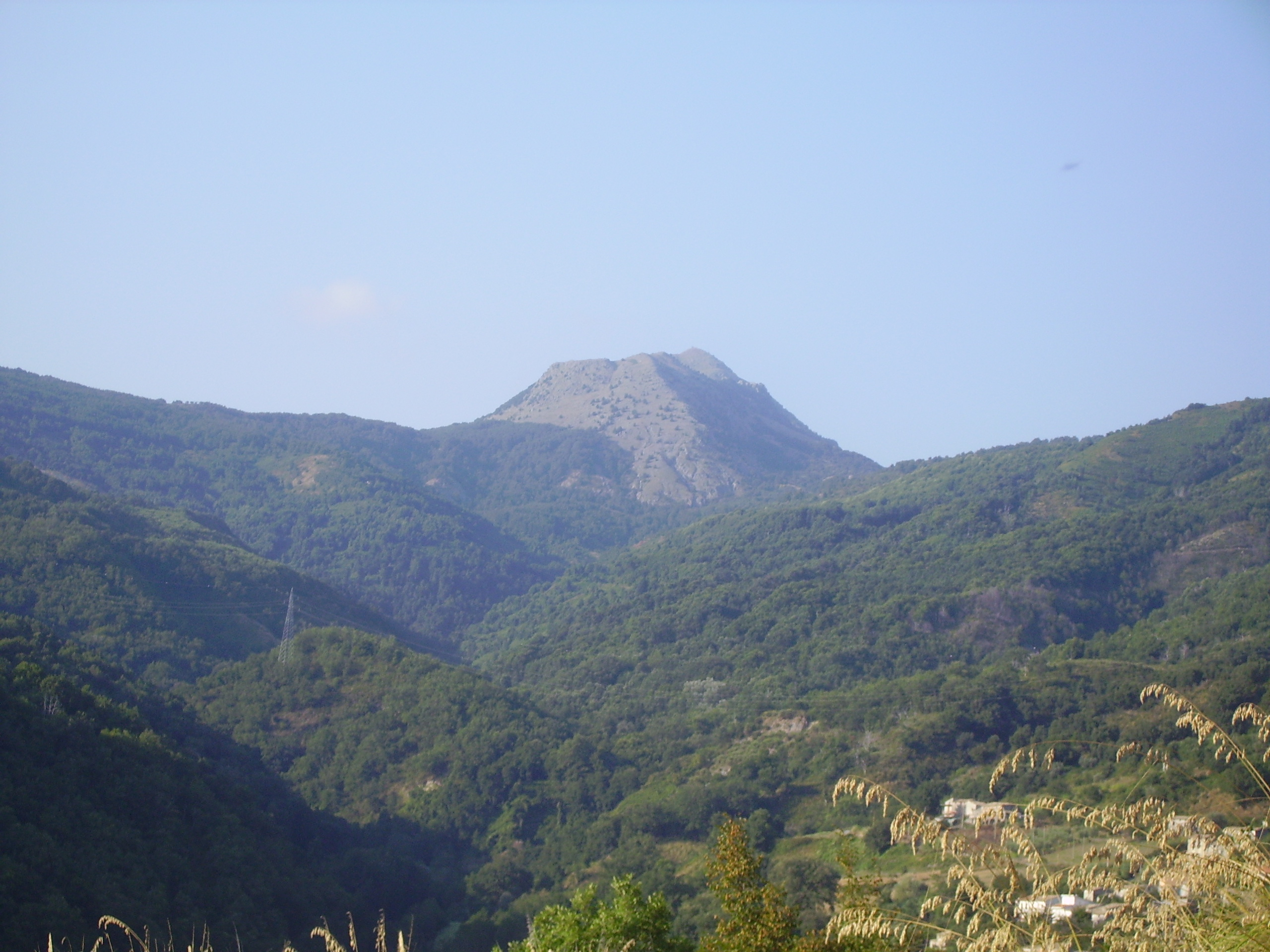
- Monte Cocuzzo seen from the countryside of Belmonte Calabro

Highest point
- Elevation: 1,541 m (5,056 ft)
- Coordinates: 39°13′07″N 16°07′59″E

Geography
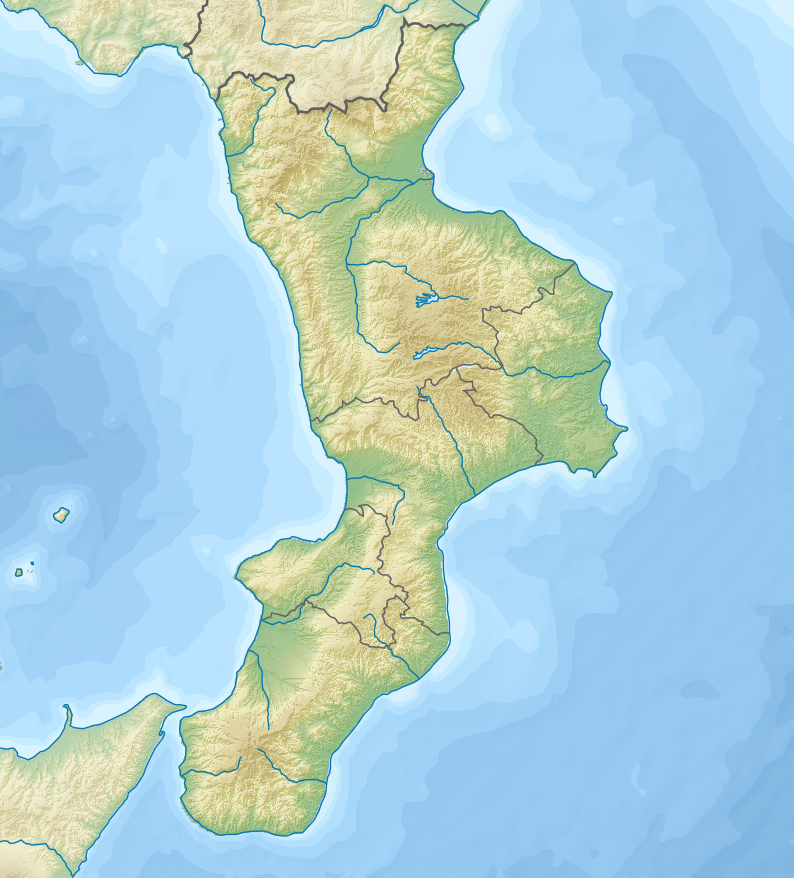
- Location within Italy Location within Calabria
- Location: Calabria, Italy
- Parent range: Catena Costiera, Calabrian Apennines

Monte Cocuzzo is a mountain in the Catena Costiera in the Calabrian Apennines, in the province of Cosenza, southern Italy. It has an elevation of 1,541 m.

The name derives from the Latin Cacutium, in turn from the Greek κακός κύτος, meaning "bad stone" or "bad hole", referring to its alleged volcanic origin (shown also by its conical shape). Geologically, however, Monte Cocuzzo consists of sedimentary strata, mostly dolomite.
