= List of RAF aircrew in the Battle of Britain (G–K) =

The following is a list of pilots and other aircrew who flew during the Battle of Britain, and were awarded the Battle of Britain Clasp to the 1939–45 Star by flying at least one authorised operational sortie with an eligible unit of the Royal Air Force or Fleet Air Arm during the period from 0001 hours on 10 July to 2359 hours 31 October 1940.

== History ==
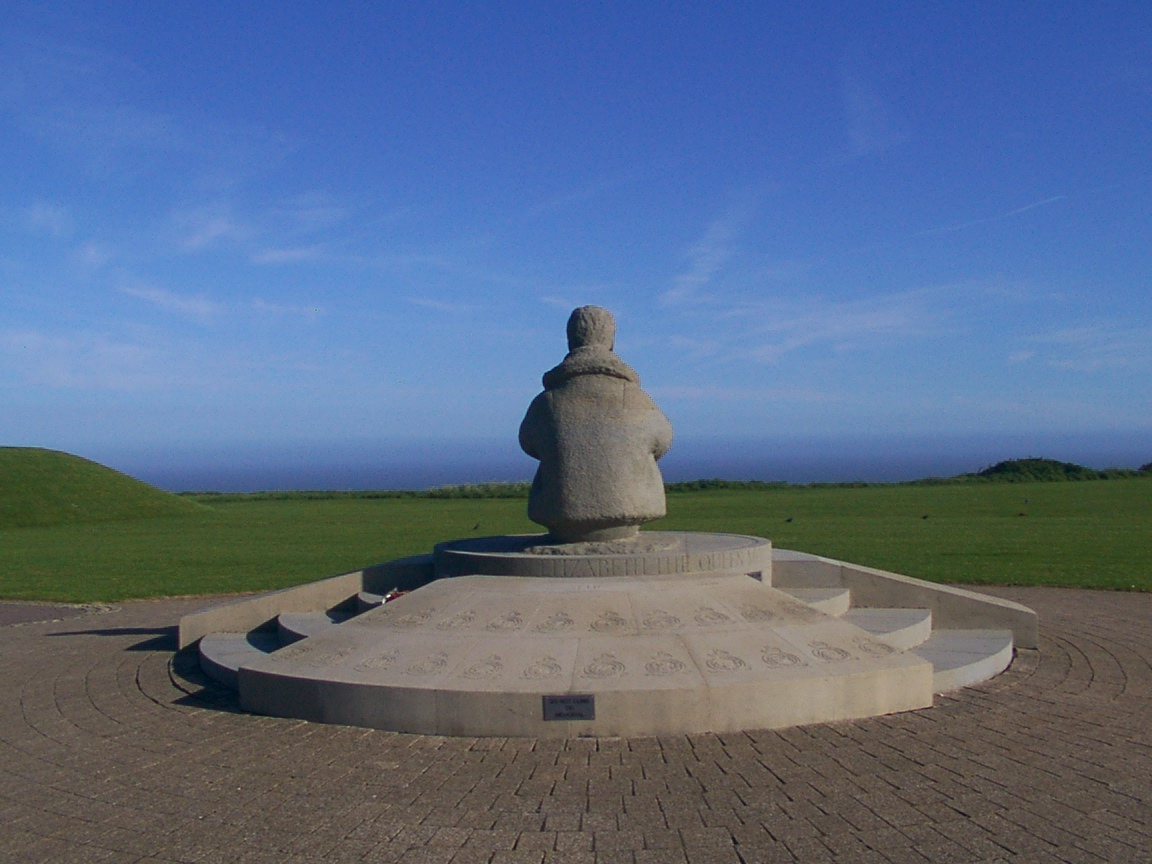
Battle of Britain Memorial at Capel-le-Ferne

In 1942, the Air Ministry made the decision to compile a list from records of the names of pilots who had lost their lives as a result of the fighting during the Battle of Britain (Note: This was initially regarded as being from 8 August to 31 October 1940; however, the dates were later amended to also include those who lost their lives between 10 July and 7 August.) for the purpose of building a national memorial. This became the Battle of Britain Chapel at Westminster Abbey, which was unveiled by King George VI on 10 July 1947. The Roll of Honour within the Chapel contains the names of 1,497 pilots and aircrew killed or mortally wounded during the Battle.

Nothing was done officially, however, to define the qualifications for the classification of a Battle of Britain airman until 9 November 1960. AMO N850, published by the Air Ministry, stated for the first time the requirements for the awarding of the Battle of Britain Star, and listed the 71 units which were deemed to have been under the control of RAF Fighter Command.

In 1955 Flt Lt John Holloway, a serving RAF officer, began a personal challenge to compile a complete list of "The Few". After fourteen years of research Flt Lt Holloway had 2,946 names on the list. Of these airmen, 537 were killed during the Battle or later died of wounds received.

The Battle of Britain Memorial Trust, founded by Geoffrey Page, raised funds for the construction of the Battle of Britain Memorial at Capel-le-Ferne near Folkestone in Kent. The Memorial, unveiled by Queen Elizabeth The Queen Mother on 9 July 1993, shares the site with the Christopher Foxley-Norris Memorial Wall on which a complete list of "The Few" is engraved.

More recently, the Battle of Britain Monument on the Victoria Embankment in London was unveiled on 18 September 2005 by Their Royal Highnesses the Prince of Wales and the Duchess of Cornwall. The idea for the monument was conceived by the Battle of Britain Historical Society which then set about raising funds for its construction. The outside of the monument is lined with bronze plaques listing all the Allied airmen who took part in the Battle.

== G ==
| Name | Rank | Nationality | Sqn during Battle | Awards | Notes |
|---|---|---|---|---|---|
| Gabszewicz, Aleksander Klemens | Fg Off | POL | 607 Sqn | VM V & IV, KW***, DSO, DFC | Died 1983 |
| Gadd, James Edward | Sgt | BR | 611 Sqn | | |
| Gage, Douglas Hugh | Plt Off | BR | 602 Sqn | | MIA 6 June 1941 |
| Gallus, Pawel Piotr | Sgt | POL | 3 & 303 Sqns | VM, KW**, DFC | |
| Gamblen, Douglas Robert | Fg Off | BR | 41 Sqn | | MIA 29 July 1940 over Dover. Remembered on Panel 5 of the Runnymede Memorial |
| Gane, Sidney Russell | Plt Off | BR | 248 Sqn | | KIA 20 October 1940 (Pilot) |
| Gant, Ernest | Sgt | BR | 236 Sqn | | |
| Gardiner, Fredrick Thomas | Fg Off | BR | 610 Sqn | DFC | |
| Gardiner, Eric Cecil | Sgt | BR | 219 Sqn | | KIA 30 October 1940 (Air Gunner) |
| Gardiner, William Nairn | Sgt | BR | 3 Sqn | | |
| Gardner, Bernard George Derry | Sgt | BR | 610 Sqn | | KIA 28 June 1941 (Pilot). Buried in Hollybrook Cemetery, Southampton. |
| Gard'ner, John Rushton | Plt Off | NZ | 141 Sqn | | Died 6 May 2011, New Zealand. |
| Gardner, Peter Melvill | Plt Off | BR | 32 Sqn | | Died 23 May 1984 |
| Gardner, Richard Exton "Jimmy" | Sub Lt (FAA) | BR | 242 Sqn | | |
| Garfield, Walter James | Sgt | BR | 248 Sqn | | KIA 13 September 1940 (Pilot) |
| Garrad, Anthony Hugh Hamilton | Plt Off | BR | 248 Sqn | | MIA 3 November 1940 |
| Garside, Geoffrey | Sgt | BR | 236 Sqn | | |
| Garton, Geoffrey William | Sgt | BR | 73 Sqn | | Died November 1976 |
| Garvey, Leonard Arthur | Sgt | BR | 41 Sqn | | Born Aston, Warwickshire, 1914. (Pilot); KIA 30 October 1940 near Canterbury, aged 26; son of Andrew J. & Sarah A. Garvey of Erdington, Birmingham; buried in Section 56, Grave 10373 of Witton Cemetery, Birmingham. |
| Garvin, George Desmond | Sqn Ldr | BR | 264 Sqn (CO) | | |
| Gash, Fredrick "Fred" | Sgt | BR | 264 Sqn | | |
| Gaskell, Richard Stuart | Plt Off | BR | 264 Sqn | | |
| Gaunce, Lionel Manley "Elmer" | Flt Lt | CAN | 615 Sqn | DFC | Born Lethbridge, Alberta, Canada, 20 September 1915; MIA 19 November 1941, aged 25; remembered on Panel 28 of the Runnymede Memorial; mountain in Jasper National Park, Canada, has been named for him. |
| Gaunt, Geoffrey Norman | Plt Off | BR | 609 Sqn | | KIA 15 September 1940 |
| Gaunt, William Edwin | Sgt | BR | 23 Sqn | | |
| Gavan, Arthur | Sgt | BR | 54 Sqn | | |
| Gawith, Alan Antill | Plt Off | NZ | 23 Sqn | DFC | Surviving aircrew |
| Gayner, John Richard Hensman | Fg Off | BR | 615 Sqn | | Died 1987 |
| Gear, Alan Walter | Sgt | BR | 32 Sqn | DFC | |
| Geddes, Keith Irvine | Fg Off | BR | 604 Sqn | DFC | |
| Gee, Victor David | Sgt | BR | 219 Sqn | | KIA 21 March 1941 |
| Genney, Terence | Fg Off | BR | 604 Sqn | MC | KIFA 6 February 1941 (Testing) |
| Gent, Raymond John Kitchell | Sgt | BR | 501 & 32 Sqns | | KIFA 2 January 1941 (hit trees) |
| Gibbins, Dudley Guy | Sgt | BR | 54 & 222 Sqns | | |
| Gibson, John Albert Axel | Flt Lt | NZ | 501 Sqn | DSO, DFC | |
| Giddings, Herbert Selwyn | Flt Lt | BR | 615 & 111 Sqn2 | | KIA 23 January 1943 |
| Gil, Jozef | Plt Off | POL | 43, 229 & 145 Sqns | VM, KW** | MIA 31 December 1942 |
| Gilbert, Ernest George | Plt Off | BR | 64 Sqn | | |
| Gilbert, Humphrey Trench | Fg Off | BR | 3 Sqn | DFC | KIFA 7 May 1942 |
| Gilbert, Peter Robert Joseph | Mid (FAA) | BR | 111 Sqn | | |
| Gilders, John Stanley "Gilly" | Sgt | BR | 72 Sqn | | Born Deal, Kent, 4 October 1919; KIA 21 February 1941. FTR, assumed oxygen failure and crashed, aged 21; body not found, listed as 'missing, believed killed' for 53 years; remains recovered in April 1994 and buried in Brookwood Military Cemetery, Surrey, Grave 20. E. 15, 11 May 1995 |
| Gill, James Vivian | Sgt | BR | 23 Sqn | | KIA 2 July 1941 |
| Gillam, Denys Edgar | Flt Lt | BR | 312 & 616 Sqns | DSO**, DFC*, AFC | Died September 1991 |
| Gillam, Ernest | Sgt | BR | 248 Sqn | | MIA 19 October 1941 |
| Gillan, James | Fg Off | BR | 601 Sqn | | MIA 11 August 1940 |
| Gillen, Thomas William | Fg Off | BR | 247 Sqn | | Died 1969 |
| Gillespie, James Lyon | Plt Off | BR | 23 Sqn | | Died 1 October 1940 (non-service related death). |
| Gillies, Kenneth McLeod | Flt Lt | BR | 66 Sqn | | KIA 4 October 1940.He took off from Gravesend in Spitfire X 4320 with two others to intercept bombers over the Dungeness areas. At 13,000 feet they sighted a He 111, which they attacked through cloud. Gillies called over the radio saying he was returning to base but did not say why. He must have crashed into the channel as his body washed up on the Suffolk coast at Covehithe on the 21st of October. He is generally credited with 11 ‘victories’. |
| Gillman, Kenneth Reginald | Plt Off | BR | 32 Sqn | | MIA 25 August 1940 when he failed to return from combat near Dover in Hurricane N2433. |
| Gilroy, George Kemp "Sheep" | Fg Off | BR | 603 Sqn | DFC, AE | |
| Gilyeat, Harold Roy | AC | BR | 29 Sqn | | (1921–1995) |
| Girdwood, Alexander George | Sgt | BR | 257 Sqn | | KIA 29 October 1940 |
| Glaser, Ernest Derek "Dave" | Plt Off | BR | 65 Sqn | DFC, AE | Born 20 April 1921; died July 2001, aged 79. |
| Gleave, Thomas Percy | Sqn Ldr | BR | 253 Sqn | CBE | |
| Gledhill, Geoffrey | Sgt | BR | 238 Sqn | | KIA 11 August 1940 |
| Gleed, Ian Richard | Flt Lt | BR | 87 Sqn | DSO, DFC, CrG | KIA 16 April 1943 |
| Glegg, Alexander Joseph | Plt Off | BR | 600 Sqn | DFC* | |
| Glendinning, John Nixon | Sgt | BR | 54 & 74 Sqns | | KIA 12 March 1941 |
| Glew, Norman Vipan "Sticky" | Sgt | BR | 72 Sqn | | Born Derby, November 1916. Commissioned Aug 1941; KIFA 17 May 1944 while serving with 1435 Squadron, Brindisi, Italy, aged 27; son of Capt. Norman H. & Mildred A. Glew of Derby; buried in Grave XI. C. 24 of Bari War Cemetery, Italy. |
| Głowacki, Antoni "Toni" | Sgt | POL | 501 Sqn | VM, KW***, DFC, DFM | Died 27 April 1980 |
| Glowacki, Witold Jozef | Sgt | POL | 605 & 145 Sqns | VM | KIA 24 September 1940 |
| Glyde, Richard Lindsay | Fg Off | AUS | 87 Sqn | DFC | MIA 13 August 1940 |
| Gmur, Feliks | Sgt | POL | 151 Sqn | | KIA 30 August 1940 |
| Gnys, Wladyslaw | Plt Off | POL | 302 Sqn | VM, KW** | Died 1983 |
| Goddard, Henry Gordon | Fg Off | BR | 219 Sqn | DSO, DFC, AFC | Died 1972. |
| Goddard, William Bernard | Flt Lt | BR | 235 Sqn | DFC | MIA 15 June 1941 |
| Goldsmith, Claude Waller | Fg Off | SA | 603 & 54 Sqns | | WIA 28 October 1940 |
| Goldsmith, John Ernest | Sgt | BR | 236 Sqn | | KIFA 27 April 1941 |
| Gonay, Henri Alphonse Clement | Plt Off | BEL | 611 Sqn | | KIA 14 June 1944 |
| Goodall, Harold Ingham | Plt Off | BR | 264 Sqn | | KIA 19 October 1940 |
| Gooden, Stephen Frederick | Sqn Ldr | BR | 3 Sqn (CO) | CBE | Died August 1966. |
| Gooderham, Albert Thomas | Sgt | BR | 25, 151 & 46 Sqn | | MIA 2 November 1941 |
| Goodman, Geoffrey | Sgt | BR | 85 Sqn | MBE, DFC | Died 1976 |
| Goodman, George Ernest "Randy" | Plt Off | BR | 1 Sqn | DFC | KIA 14 June 1941 |
| Goodman, Maurice Yenning | Sgt | BR | 604 Sqn | DFC | Died 8 July 1988. |
| Goodwin, Charles | Sgt | BR | 219 Sqn | | KIA 30 September 1940 |
| Goodwin, Henry McDonald | Fg Off | BR | 609 Sqn | | KIA 14 August 1940 |
| Goodwin, Roy Daniel | Sgt | BR | 64 Sqn | | Died in 1983 |
| Goodwin, Stanley Albert | Sgt | BR | 266 & 66 Sqns | | Died 7 March 1982. |
| Goord, Robert Leslie | Plt Off | BR | 151 Sqn | | |
| Gordon, John Arthur Gerald | Sqn Ldr | CAN | 151 Sqn | | MIA 1 June 1942 |
| Gordon, Stanley | Sgt | BR | 235 Sqn | | KIA 28 May 1941 |
| Gordon, William Hugh Gibson | Plt Off | BR | 234 Sqn | | KIA 6 September 1940 |
| Gore, William Ernest | Flt Lt | BR | 607 Sqn | DFC | MIA 28 September 1940 |
| Gorrie, David George | Plt Off | BR | 43 Sqn | | KIFA 8 April 1941 |
| Gorzula, Mieczyslaw | Plt Off | POL | 607 Sqn | KW** | |
| Gosling, Reginald Clive | Plt Off | BR | 266 Sqn | | 4 July 1919 – 27 Jun 2001 |
| Göth, Vilém | Plt Off | CZ | 310 & 501 Sqns | | KIA 25 October 1940 |
| Gothorpe, ? | Sgt | BR | 25 Sqn | | Service details unknown |
| Gould, Derrick Leslie | Fg Off | BR | 32, 607 & 601 Sqns | DFC | |
| Gould, Gordon Leslie | Sgt | BR | 235 Sqn | | |
| Gouldstone, Ronald Joseph | Sgt | BR | 29 Sqn | | KIA 25 August 1940 when Blenheim L1330 was probably shot down in combat off Wainfleet and crashed into the sea, other two crew members missing. |
| Gout, Geoffrey Kenneth | Plt Off | BR | 234 Sqn | | KIA 25 July 1940 |
| Gowers, Arthur Vincent | Fg Off | BR | 85 Sqn | DFC | MIA 24 October 1943 |
| Gracie, Edward John "Jumbo" | Flt Lt | BR | 56 Sqn | DFC | KIA 15 February 1944 |
| Graham, Edward | Flt Lt | BR | 72 Sqn | | |
| Graham, James | Sgt | BR | 236 Sqn | DFM | KIA 26 June 1942 |
| Graham, Kenneth Alfred George | Plt Off | BR | 600 & 111 Sqn | | MIA 8 February 1941 |
| Graham, Leslie William | Plt Off | SA | 56 Sqn | | |
| Grandy, John | Sqn Ldr | BR | 249 Sqn (CO) | | 2 January 2004 |
| Grant, Donald | Sub Lt (FAA) | BR | 804 Sqn | | |
| Grant, Edwin John Forgan | Sgt | BR | 600 Sqn | | KIA 1 December 1941 |
| Grant, Ian Allan Charles | Sgt | NZ | 151 Sqn | | MIA 13 February 1943 |
| Grant, Stanley Bernard | Fg Off | BR | 65 Sqn | DFC | Died July 1987. |
| Grassick, Robert Davidson | Fg Off | CAN | 242 Sqn | DFC | |
| Graves, Edward Arthur | Sgt | BR | 235 Sqn | | KIA 30 August 1940 |
| Graves, Richard Courtney | Plt Off | BR | 253 Sqn | | KIFA 1978 |
| Gray, Anthony Philip | Flt Lt | BR | 615 Sqn | | Died 1986. |
| Gray, Clifford Kempson | Plt Off | BR | 43 Sqn | DFC | Died 13 February 1990 |
| Gray, Colin Falkland | Plt Off | NZ | 54 Sqn | DSO, DFC** | Died 1 August 1995 |
| Gray, Donald McIntosh | Plt Off | BR | 610 Sqn | | KIFA 5 November 1940 |
| Gray, Kenneth William | Sgt | BR | 85 Sqn | | KIA 9 June 1944 |
| Gray, Malcolm | Sgt | BR | 72 Sqn | | KIA 25 September 1940 |
| Gray, Trevor | Plt Off | BR | 64 Sqn | | Surviving aircrew |
| Grayson, Charles | Flt Sgt | BR | 213 Sqn | | KIA 8 July 1945 |
| Green, Alexander William Valentine | Plt Off | BR | 235 Sqn | | MIA 11 September 1940 |
| Green, Charles Patrick | Flt Lt | BR | No. 421 (Reconnaissance) Flight | DSO, DFC | |
| Green, Fredrick William Woolridge | Sgt | BR | 600 Sqn | | Surviving aircrew |
| Green, George Graham | Sgt | BR | 236 Sqn | | |
| Green, Herbert Edward | Sgt | BR | 141 Sqn | OBE | |
| Green, Maurice David | Plt Off | BR | 248 Sqn | | MIA 20 October 1940 |
| Green, William James | Sgt | BR | 501 Sqn | | Surviving aircrew |
| Greenshields, Henry la Fore | Sub Lt (FAA) | BR | 266 Sqn | | KIA 16 August 1940 |
| Greenwood, John Peter Bowtell | Plt Off | BR | 253 Sqn | | Surviving aircrew |
| Gregory, Albert Edward | Sgt | BR | 219 Sqn | DFC, AE | Died 12 November 2010. |
| Gregory, Alfred Henry | Sgt | BR | 111 Sqn | | KIA 23 July 1941 |
| Gregory, Felix Stafford | Plt Of | BR | 65 Sqn | | KIA 13 August 1940 |
| Gregory, William James "Sticks" | Sgt | BR | 29 Sqn | DSO, DFC*, AFC, DFM | Died 6 October 2001 |
| Grellis, Horace Eustace | Plt Off | BR | 23 Sqn | | |
| Gresty, Kenneth Gaston | Sgt | BR | 219 Sqn | | MIA 17 April 1941 |
| Gretton, Reginald Harry | Sgt | BR | 266 & 222 Sqn | | |
| Gribble, Dorian George | Flt Lt | BR | 54 Sqn | DFC | MIA 4 June 1941 |
| Grice, Dennis Neve | Fg Off | BR | 600 Sqn | DFC | KIA 8 August 1940 |
| Grice, Douglas Hamilton | Fg Off | BR | 32 Sqn | DFC | |
| Gridley, Robert Victor | Sgt | BR | 235 Sqn | | MIA 13 January 1942 (Malta) |
| Grier, Thomas | Fg Off | BR | 601 Sqn | | KIA 5 December 1941 |
| Griffin, John James | Sgt | BR | 73 Sqn | | KIA 7 April 1942 |
| Griffiths, C | Sgt | BR | 32 Sqn | | |
| Griffiths, Glyn | Sgt | BR | 17 Sqn | DFM | 1918-1983 |
| Grogan, George Jacques | Plt Off | IRE | 23 Sqn | | |
| Groszewski, Bernard | Fg Off | POL | 43 Sqn | KW | KIA 12 December 1941 |
| Grove, Harry Cyril | Sgt | BR | 3 & 501 Sqn | | KIA 8 November 1940 |
| Grubb, Ernest George | Sgt | BR | 219 Sqn | | |
| Grubb, Henry Frank | Sgt | BR | 219 Sqn | | |
| de Grunne, Rodolphe Ghislain Charles de Hemricourt | Plt Off | BEL | 32 Sqn | | KIA 25 May 1942 |
| Gruszka, Franciszek | Fg Off | POL | 65 Sqn | | KIA 18 August 1940 |
| Grzeszczak, Bohdan | Fg Off | POL | 303 Sqn | KW* | KIFA 28 August 1941 (Instructing pupil) |
| Guerin, Charles Paul | Adj (Free French) | FR | 232 Sqn | | MIA 3 May 1941 |
| Guest, Thomas Francis | Plt Off | BR | 79 & 56 Sqn | | Shot down & captured 26 April 1941 |
| Gundry, Kenneth Craddock | Plt Off | BR | 257 Sqn | | KIA 22 May 1942 flying with 112 Sqn |
| Gunn, Harold Raymond | Plt Off | BR | 74 Sqn | | KIA 31 July 1940 |
| Gunning, Peter Stackhouse | Plt Off | BR | 46 Sqn | | KIA 15 October 1940 |
| Gunter, Edward Maurice | Plt Off | BR | 43 & 501 Sqn | | KIA 27 September 1940 |
| Gurteen, John Vinter | Plt Off | BR | 504 Sqn | | KIA 15 September 1940 |
| Guthrie, Giles Connop McEacharn | Lt (FAA) | BR | 808 Sqn | | Died 31 December 1979 |
| Guy, Leonard Northwood "Len" | Sgt | BR | 601 Sqn | | MIA 18 August 1940 |
| Guy, Peter | Mid (FAA) | BR | 808 Sqn | | KIA 28 January 1942 |
| Guymer, Eric Norman Laurence | Sgt | BR | 238 Sqn | | |

== H ==
| Name | Rank | Nationality | Sqn during Battle | Awards | Notes |
|---|---|---|---|---|---|
| Hackwood, Gerald Henry | Plt Off | BR | 264 Sqn | | KIA 20 November 1940 |
| Haig, John Galloway Edward | Plt Off | BR | 603 Sqn | | |
| Haigh, Cyril | Sgt | BR | 604 Sqn | | KIA 25 August 1940 (Pilot) Blenheim L6782 crashed near Witheridge, Exeter, cause unknown. |
| Haine, Richard Cummins | Plt Off | BR | 600 Sqn | DFC | Died 30 September 2008. |
| Haines, Leonard Archibald | Fg Off | BR | 19 Sqn | DFC | KIA 30 April 1941 (Pilot) |
| Haire, John Keatinge | Sgt | BR | 145 Sqn | | KIA 6 November 1940 (Pilot) |
| Hairs, Peter Raymond | Plt Off | BR | 501 Sqn | MBE | Surviving aircrew |
| Hall, P F | Sgt | BR | 235 Sqn | | |
| Hall, Robert | Sgt | BR | 29 Sqn | | Sergeant Air Gunner Robert Hall – No 29 Squadron RAF. Hall joined the RAFVR in October 1939, as an Airman u/t Air Gunner. He was with 29 Squadron at Wellingore for part of the Battle of Britain. He made his first operational sortie with the squadron on 15 September 1940, and his final sortie, as an Air Gunner, on 12 December 1940. The squadron began receiving its first Beaufighters about this time. Hall retrained as a Radar Operator and flew his first Beaufighter sortie on 29 March 1941, and his last on 3 October 1941. On 7 October 1941, Hall was flying with Flying Officer C R Miles, in Beaufighter T3355, the aircraft hit high ground at Westfield Sole, Kent, and both men were killed |
| Hall, Noel Mudie | Flt Lt | BR | 257 Sqn | AFC | 1916–1940 KIA 8 August 1940 aged 24 when his Hurricane P2981 was shot down by Bf 109s off St. Catherines Point. |
| Hall, Rosswell Clifford | Plt Off | BR | 219 Sqn | | Cashiered by sentence of Court Martial 1942 |
| Hall, Roger Montague Dickenson | Plt Off | BR | 152 Sqn | DFC | |
| Hallam, Ian Lewis McGregor | Fg Off | BR | 222 Sqn | DFC | KIFA 10 May 1952 |
| Halliwell, Antony Burton | Plt Off | BR | 141 Sqn | | Died 1974. |
| Hallowes, Herbert James Lempriere "Darkie" | Sgt | BR | 43 Sqn | | Died 20 October 1987. |
| Halton, Derrick Walton | Sgt | BR | 615 Sqn | | 1919–1940 MIA 15 August 1940 after his Spitfire P2801 was shot down in combat with Bf 109s. |
| D'Hamale, Roger Emile de Cannart | Sgt | BEL | 46 Sqn | | KIA 1 November 1940 |
| Hamar, Jack Royston | Plt Off | BR | 151 Sqn | | KIA 24 July 1940 |
| Hamblin, Richard Kaye | Wg Cdr | BR | 17 Sqn | CBE | (1906–1988) |
| Hamer, Russel Chapman "Lofty" | Sgt | BR | 141 Sqn | | 1916–1942 KIA 8 September 1942 |
| Hamill, John Warren | Plt Off | NZ | 299 Sqn | | Killed ferrying aircraft 24 December 1940 (Pilot) |
| Hamilton, Alexander Lewis | Plt Off | AUS | 248 Sqn | | |
| Hamilton, Arthur Charles | Plt Off | BR | 141 Sqn | | 1912–1940 KIA 19 July 1940 when as an Air Gunner in Defiant L7009 he was shot down by Bf 109s and crashed at Dover; pilot Flt Lt I.D.G Donald was also killed. |
| Hamilton, Charles Blackley | Sgt | BR | 219 Sqn | DFC | KIA 13 April 1945 (Navigator in 1945) |
| Hamilton, Claud Eric "Hamish" | Plt Off | BR | 234 Sqn | | KIA 14 May 1941 (Malta) (Pilot) |
| Hamilton, Harry Raymond | Flt Lt | CAN | 85 Sqn | | KIA 29 August 1940 (Pilot) |
| Hamilton, James Sutherland | Sgt | BR | 248 Sqn | | KIA 13 December 1940 |
| Hamlyn, Ronald Fairfax | Sgt | BR | 610 Sqn | | |
| Hammerton, Jack | Sgt | BR | 3 & 615 Sqns | | KIA 6 November 1940 (Pilot) |
| Hammond, Derek John | Plt Off | BR | 253 & 245 Sqns | | |
| Hampshire, Cyril Edward | Sgt | BR | 85, 111 & 249 Sqns | | Commissioned in 1942 |
| Hanbury, Bruce Alexander | Plt Off | BR | 1 Sqn | | KIA 27 March 1942 |
| Hanbury, Osgood Villiers | Plt Off | BR | 602 Sqn | DSO DFC* | KIA 3 June 1943 |
| Hancock, Ernest Lindsey | Plt Off | BR | 609 Sqn | | |
| Hancock, Norman Edward | Plt Off | BR | 65 & 152 Sqns | DFC | Died December 2008. |
| Hancock, Norman Patrick Watkins | Plt Off | BR | 1 Sqn | OBE, DFC | Died 23 February 2003. |
| Hannan, George Henry | Plt Off | BR | 236 Sqn | | KIA 21 December 1940 (Air Gunner) |
| Hanson, David Harry Wellstead | Fg Off | BR | 17 Sqn | | KIA 3 September 1940 in Hurricane P3539, shot down near Foulness after destroying a Do. 17; Hanson baled out at 100 ft and was killed. (1918–1940) |
| Hanuš, Jan Josef | Plt Off | CZ | 310 Sqn | | Died 21 April 1992 |
| Hanzlíček, Otto | Sgt | CZ | 312 Sqn | | KIA 10 October 1940 (drowned) |
| Hardacre, John Reginald | Fg Off | BR | 504 Sqn | | KIA 30 September 1940 (Pilot) |
| Hardcastle, Jack | Sgt | BR | 219 Sqn | | KIFA 28 October 1940 (Wireless Operator) |
| Hardie, G | Sgt | BR | 232 Sqn | | |
| Harding, Noel Douglas | Sgt | BR | 29 Sqn | | |
| Hardman, Harry Gordon | Fg Off | AUS | 111 Sqn | | Battle of Britain London Monument – F/O H G Hardman |
| Hargreaves, Frederick Norman | Plt Off | BR | 92 Sqn | | KIA 11 September 1940 |
| Harkness, Hill | Sqn Ldr | IRE | 257 Sqn | | |
| Harrison, David Stewart | Plt Off | BR | 238 Sqn | | KIA 28 September 1940 (Pilot) |
| Harrison, John Howard | Plt Off | BR | 145 Sqn | | KIA 12 August 1940 |
| Harrold, Frederick Cecil | Plt Off | BR | 151 & 501 Sqns | | KIA 28 September 1940 (Pilot) |
| Hart, John Stewart | Fg Off | CAN | 602 & 54 Sqns | DFC | Died August 2019 |
| Hartas, Peter McDonnell | Fg Off | BR | 616 Sqns & 603 Sqns & No. 421 (Reconnaissance) Flight | | KIA 10 February 1941 |
| Haviland, John Kenneth | Plt Off | AME | 151 Sqn | | Died 1 July 2002. |
| Haw, Charlton | Sgt | BR | 504 Sqn | DFC, DFM, Order of Lenin | Died November 1993 |
| Hayes, Thomas Norman | Fg Off | BR | 600 Sqn | DFC | (1912–2010) |
| Hay, Richard Cuthbert | Lieutenant | BR | 808 Naval Air Squadron | | Royal Marine |
| Hayter, James Chilton Francis "Spud" | Fg Off | NZ | 605 & 615 Sqns | DFC* | Died 3 October 2006 |
| Haywood, Douglas "Haybag" | Sgt | BR | 151 Sqn | | Born London, 9 June 1913. Shot down and captured during Ramrod to St Pol, France, 27 August 1943; released 1945 and continued in RAF, retiring in June 1955 |
| Head, Fredrick Arthur Percy | Sgt | BR | 236 Sqn | | MIA 1 August 1940 |
| Head, Geoffrey Mons | Sgt | BR | 219 Sqn | | KIA 8 February 1941 |
| Heal, Philip William Dunstan | Flt Lt | BR | 604 Sqn | AFC | |
| Healy, Terence William Richard | Sgt | BR | 41 & 611 Sqns | | Born Islington, London, 1 May 1920; son of Lt Col Christopher Healy MC, CdG (B) & Mabelle Healy of Edgware, Middlesex; Commissioned June 1941; KIA 2 March 1944 with 266 Sqn, aged 23; buried in Grave XXVIII. H. 24 of Bayeux War Cemetery, Calvados, France. |
| Heath, Barrie | Fg Off | BR | 611 Sqn | DFC | Died 1988. |
| Hebron, George Stephen | Plt Off | BR | 235 Sqn | | |
| Hedges, Alan Lindsay | Plt Off | BR | 245 & 257 Sqn | | Died 1997. |
| Heimes, Leopold "Pol" | Sgt | BR | 235 Sqn | | Died 26 June 2009 |
| Helcke, Denis Arnold | Sgt | BR | 504 Sqn | | KIA 17 September 1940 |
| Hellyer, Richard Owen | Flt Lt | BR | 616 Sqn | | |
| Hemingway, John Allman | Fg Off | IRE | 85 Sqn | DFC | |
| Henderson, James Alan MacDonald | Flt Lt | BR | 257 Sqn | | |
| Hendry, David Oswald | AC | BR | 264 Sqn | DFC | |
| Henn, William Bryan | Sgt | BR | 501 Sqn | | Died 1979 |
| Henneberg, Zdzislaw Karol | Fg Off | POL | 303 Sqn | VM, KW**, DFC | MIA 12 April 1941 |
| Henson, Bernard | Sgt | BR | 32 & 257 Sqn | | KIA 17 November 1940 |
| Henstock, Lawrence Frederick | Flt Lt | BR | 64 Sqn | | Died 1981 |
| Heron, Hugh Michael Turretin | Plt Off | BR | 266 & 66 Sqn | AFC | |
| Herrick, Brian Henry | Plt Off | NZ | 236 Sqn | | MIA 24 November 1940 |
| Herrick, Michael James | Plt Off | NZ | 25 Sqn | DFC | MIA 6 June 1944 |
| Heslop, Victor William | Sgt | BR | 56 Sqn | | |
| Hess, Alexander | Sqn Ldr | CZ | 310 Sqn (CO) | DFC | Died 10 August 1981 |
| Hetherington, Erik Lawson | Sgt | BR | 601 Sqn | DFC | KIFA 31 October 1942 |
| Hewett, Gordon Arthur | Sgt | BR | 607 Sqn | | Surviving aircrew |
| Hewitt, Duncan Alexander | Plt Off | CAN | 501 Sqn | | MIA 12 July 1940 |
| Hewlett, Colin Roy | Sgt | BR | 65 Sqn | | KIA 12 December 1942 |
| Hewson, John Minchin | Flt Lt | BR | 616 Sqn | DFC | |
| Heycock, George Francis Wheaton | Sqn Ldr | BR | 23 Sqn (CO) | | (1909–1983) |
| Heywood, Norman Bagshaw | Plt Off | BR | 32, 607 & 257 Sqns | | KIA 22 October 1940 |
| Heyworth, John Harvey | Sqn Ldr | BR | 79 Sqn (CO) | AFC | (1910 – 21 September 1959) |
| Hick, David Thornhill | Sgt | BR | 32 Sqn | | Died 26 July 1973 |
| Higgins, William Burley | Sgt | BR | 32 & 253 Sqn | | KIA 14 September 1940 |
| Higginson, Frederick William "Taffy" | FSgt | BR | 56 Sqn | DFC, DFM | Died 12 February 2003 |
| Higgs, Thomas Peter Kingsland | Fg Off | BR | 111 Sqn | | KIA 10 July 1940 (Pilot) |
| Hight, Cecil Henry | Plt Off | NZ | 234 Sqn | | KIA 15 August 1940 |
| Hiles, Arthur Herbert | Plt Off | BR | 236 Sqn | | KIA 15 March 1942 |
| Hilken, Clive G | Sgt | BR | 74 Sqn | AE | Died 30 June 2005 |
| Hill, Archibald Edmund | Plt Off | BR | 248 Sqn | | KIA 15 April 1941 (Norway) |
| Hill, Arnold Maurice | Sgt | BR | 25 Sqn | DFC | |
| Hill, Charles Richard | Sgt | BR | 141 Sqn | DFC | Died 20 October 1985 |
| Hill, Geoffrey | Sgt | BR | 65 Sqn | | Crashed 4 February 1941 and taken POW |
| Hill, George Edward | Plt Off | BR | 245 Sqn | | KIA 31 March 1944 |
| Hill, Howard Perry | Plt Off | BR | 92 Sqn | | KIA 20 September 1940 |
| Hill, John Hamar "Johnnie" | Sqn Ldr | BR | 222 Sqn (CO) | | Died 1998. |
| Hill, Michael Rowland | Plt Off | SA | 266 Sqn | | KIA 12 March 1945 |
| Hill, Sydney Jenkyn | Plt Off | BR | 609 Sqn | | KIA 18 June 1941 |
| Hillary, Richard Hope | Plt Off | BR | 603 Sqn | | KIFA 18 January 1943 (Night training flight) |
| Hillcoat, Harry Bryan Lillie | Flt Lt | BR | 1 Sqn | | MIA 3 September 1940 |
| Hillman, Ralph Walter | Sgt | BR | 235 Sqn | | KIA 6 April 1941 (Wireless Operator/Air Gunner) |
| Hillwood, Peter | Sgt | BR | 56 Sqn | DFC | Died 1966 |
| Himr, Jaroslav | Plt Off | CZ | 56 Sqn | | KIA 12 September 1943 |
| Hindrup, Fredrick George | | NZ | 600 Sqn | | KIA 20 April 1941 |
| Hine, Merrik Hubert Eric | Sgt | BR | 65 Sqn | | MIA 12 December 1940 |
| Hird, Leonard | Sgt | BR | 604 Sqn | | KIA 28 June 1941 (Hamburg) Air Gunner |
| Hithersay, Arthur James Beaumont | Sgt | BR | 141 Sqn | | |
| Hlaváč, Jaroslav | Sgt | CZ | 56 Sqn | | KIA 10 October 1940 |
| Hlobil, Alois | Plt Off | CZ | 312 Sqn | | Died 15 March 1981 |
| Hoare-Scott, James Hammond | Plt Off | BR | 601 Sqn | | KIA 21 November 1940 |
| Hobbis, Dudley Ormston | Plt Off | BR | 219 Sqn | DFC | MIA 25 November 1943 |
| Hobbs, Joseph Bedo | Plt Off | BR | 3 Sqn | | KIA 7 December 1941 (Egypt) |
| Hobbs, Sydney John | Sgt | BR | 235 Sqn | | KIA 14 August 1941 |
| Hobson, Colin Anthony | Plt Off | BR | 600 Sqn | | KIA 3 October 1940 |
| Hobson, Desmond Bogan | Flt Lt | BR | 64 Sqn | | |
| Hobson, William Francis Cripps | Sqn Ldr | BR | 601 Sqn | | |
| Hodds, William Henry | Sgt | BR | 25 Sqn | | |
| Hodge, John Stephen Arthur | Sgt | BR | 141 Sqn | | KIA 15 July 1942 (El Alamein) |
| Hodgkinson, Arthur John "Hodge" | Plt Off | BR | 219 Sqn | DSO, DFC* | KIA 10 July 1943 (Italy) |
| Hodgson, William Henry | Plt Off | NZ | 85 Sqn | DFC | KIFA 13 March 1941 |
| Hodson, Claude Gordon | Sgt | BR | 229 & 1 Sqns | | |
| Hogan, Henry Algernon Vickers | Sqn Ldr | BR | 501 Sqn (CO) | DFC | |
| Hogg, Douglas William | Plt Off | BR | 25 Sqn | | KIA 3 September 1940 |
| Hogg, Edward Sydney | Fg Off | BR | 152 Sqn | | |
| Hogg, John Henry | Sgt | BR | 141 Sqn | | KIA 23 July 1942 (El Alamein) |
| Hogg, Robert Dudley | Sgt | BR | 17, 257 & 56 Sqns | | KIA 11 November 1940 |
| Hogg, Richard Malzard | Plt Off | BR | 152 Sqn | | MIA 25 August 1940 when Spitfire R6810 was shot down in combat over the Channel. |
| Hogg, Ralph Vincent | Sgt | BR | 616 Sqn | | Born West Hartlepool, 1916; son of James W. & Mary C. Hogg of West Hartlepool, Co. Durham; MIA 10 December 1940, 41 Sqn, aged 24; remembered on Panel 15 of the Runnymede Memorial. |
| Holden, Eustace | Flt Lt | BR | 501 Sqn | DFC | Brother of Kenneth Holden (see below). |
| Holden, Kenneth | Plt Off | BR | 616 Sqn | DFC | Brother of Eustace Holden (see above); died 1991. |
| Holder, Gerald Arthur | Sgt | BR | 236 Sqn | | Surviving aircrew |
| Holder, Robert | Sgt | NZ | 151 Sqn | | KIA 26 October 1940 |
| Holderness, John Browning | Flt Lt | RHO | 1 & 229 Sqns | | Died 16 April 2008 |
| Holland, Arthur Lawrence | Sqn Ldr | BR | 501 & 65 Sqns (CO) | | |
| Holland, Dennis Fredrick | Fg Off | BR | 72 Sqn | | KIA 20 September 1940 |
| Holland, Kenneth Christopher | Sgt | AUS | 152 Sqn | | KIA 25 September 1940 (Pilot) |
| Holland, Robert Hugh | Fg Off | BR | 92 Sqn | DFC | Died 17 November 1954 |
| Holland, Robert Meredith | Sgt | BR | 600 Sqn | | |
| Hollis, Ernest James | Sgt | BR | 25 Sqn | | Died 27 January 1975 |
| Holloway, Sydney Victor | Sgt | BR | 25 Sqn | OBE | |
| Hollowell, Kenneth Bruce | Sgt | BR | 25 Sqn | | |
| Holmes, Eric Leonard | Sgt | BR | 248 Sqn | | KIA 12 June 1941 |
| Holmes, Fredrick Henry | Plt Off | BR | 152 Sqn | | KIA 4 December 1944 |
| Holmes, G | Sgt | BR | 25 Sqn | | Service details unknown |
| Holmes, George Henry | Plt Off | BR | 600 Sqn | DFM | WIA 25 December 1940 |
| Holmes, Raymond Towers "Ray" | Sgt | BR | 504 Sqn | | Died 27 June 2005. |
| Holroyd, Wilfred Barwell | Sgt | BR | 501 & 151 Sqns | | |
| Holton, Arthur Gerald Vaughan | Sgt | BR | 141 Sqn | | |
| Homer, Michael Giles | Fg Off | BR | 242 & 1 Sqns | DFC | KIA 27 September 1940 |
| Hone, Douglas Harold | Plt Off | BR | 615 Sqn | | Born 30 September 1917. Remained in RAF, retiring in September 1975 as Flt Lt. |
| Honor, Dudley Sandry Garton | Fg Off | BR | 145 Sqn | DFC | |
| Hood, Hilary Richard Lionel "Robin" | Sqn Ldr | BR | 41 Sqn | DFC | Born Paddington, London, 13 May 1908; son of John & Helene Hood. Graduated RAF College, Cranwell, January 1929. 41 Sqn CO, 20 April – 5 September 1940; KIFA/MIA 5 September 1940, aged 32. Remembered on Panel 4 of the Runnymede Memorial. |
| Hook, Archie | Sgt | BR | 248 Sqn | | MIA 15 December 1940 |
| Hookway, Douglas Newcombe | Plt Off | BR | 234 Sqn | | |
| Hooper, Beresford Gwynne | Fg Off | BR | 25 Sqn | | |
| Hooper-Smith, Lawrence E | Flt Lt | BR | 234 Sqn | AE | Died 9 February 2008. |
| Archibald Philip Hope | Flt Lt | BR | 601 Sqn (CO) | DFC | Died 27 July 1987. |
| Hope, Ralph | Fg Off | BR | 605 Sqn | | KIA 14 October 1940 |
| Hopewell, James | Sgt | BR | 616 & 66 Sqns | DFM | KIA 21 January 1942 |
| Hopgood, Charles Leonard | Sgt | BR | 64 Sqn | | KIA 5 December 1940 |
| Hopkin, William Pelham | Plt Off | BR | 54 & 602 Sqns | DFC | |
| Hopton, Bernard Walter | Sgt | BR | 73 Sqn | | KIA 6 August 1941 |
| Hornby, William Henry | Sgt | BR | 234 Sqn | | |
| Horner, Frank George | Sgt | BR | 610 Sqn | | |
| Horrox, James Michael | Plt Off | BR | 151 Sqn | | MIA 16 November 1940 (After flying off HMS Argus) |
| Horský, Vladimír | Sgt | CZ | 238 Sqn | | MIA 26 September 1940 |
| Horton, Patrick Wilmot | Fg Off | NZ | 234 Sqn | MiD | MIA 16 November 1940 (After flying off HMS Argus) |
| Hough, Harold Basil Lincoln | Plt Off | BR | 600 Sqn | | KIA 16 August 1941 |
| Houghton, Cyril George | Plt Off | BR | 141 Sqn | | Died 22 May 1969 |
| Houghton, Oliver Vincent | Sgt | BR | 501 Sqn | | KIA 6 September 1940 |
| Hove d'Ertsenrijck, A E A | Plt Off | BEL | 43 & 501 Sqns | | KIA 15 September 1940 |
| Howard, ? | Sgt | BR | 235 Sqn | | Service details unknown |
| Howard, John | Plt Off | BR | 54 & 74 Sqns | | KIA 6 May 1941 |
| Howard-Williams, Peter Ian | Plt Off | BR | 19 Sqn | DFC | |
| Howarth, Eric Francis | Sgt | BR | 501 Sqn | | KIA 5 September 1941 |
| Howe, Bernard | Sgt | BR | 25 Sqn | | Kitchener Scholar at Cranwell, 1937–39; KIA 20 April 1941 |
| Howe, Donald Charles | Plt Off | BR | 235 Sqn | | |
| Howell, Francis Vincent | Sgt | BR | 87 Sqn | | Died 5 March 1984 |
| Howell, Frank Jonathan | Flt Lt | BR | 609 Sqn | DFC | KIFA 9 May 1948 |
| Howes, Harold Norman | Sgt | BR | 85 & 605 Sqn | DFM | KIFA 22 December 1940 |
| Howes, Peter | Plt Off | BR | 54 & 603 Sqns | | KIA 18 September 1940 |
| Howitt, Geoffrey Leonard | Plt Off | BR | 615 & 245 Sqns | DFC* | |
| Howitt, Isaac Edward | Sgt | BR | 41 Sqn | | Born Grantham, Lincolnshire, 24 December 1911. Commissioned October 1941. Released from RAF, 1945. |
| Howley, Richard Alexander | Plt Off | Newfoundlander | 141 Sqn | | MIA 19 July 1940 |
| Hoyle, George Vincent | Sgt | BR | 232 Sqn | | KIA 12 May 1941 |
| Hoyle, Henry Nuttall | Sgt | BR | 257 Sqn | | |
| Hradil, František | Plt Off | CZ | 18 & 310 Sqn | | KIA 5 November 1940 |
| Hrubý, Otakar | Plt Off | CZ | 111 Sqn | | Died 15 May 1993 |
| Hubáček, Josef | Sgt | CZ | 310 Sqn | | Died 9 April 1988 |
| Hubbard, Brian Fredrick Robert | Sgt | BR | 235 Sqn | | KIA 9 November 1940 (Malta) |
| Hubbard, Thomas Edward | Flt Lt | BR | 601 Sqn | | |
| Huckin, Philip Edward | Sgt | BR | 600 Sqn | DFC | |
| Hughes, A J | Sgt | BR | 245 Sqn | | |
| Hughes, David Ernest | Sgt | NZ | 600 Sqn | | KIA 3 October 1940 |
| Hughes, Dennis Lawrence | Plt Off | BR | 141 Sqn | | |
| Hughes, David Price | Flt Lt | BR | 238 Sqn | DFC | MIA 11 September 1940 |
| Hughes, Frederick Desmond | Plt Off | BR | 264 Sqn | DSO, DFC | Died 11 January 1992. |
| Hughes, John McCulloch Middlemore | Flt Lt | BR | 25 Sqn | DFC | KIA 7 December 1940 |
| Hughes, Paterson Clarence | Flt Lt | AUS | 234 Sqn | DFC | KIA 7 September 1940 (Pilot) |
| Hughes, William Robert Kent | Flt Sgt | BR | 23 Sqn | DFC, AE | Surviving aircrew |
| Hughes-Rees, John Anthony | Sgt | BR | 609 Sqn | DFM | Died 30 April 1943 (due to polio). |
| Hugo, Petrus Hendrik "Dutch" | Plt Off | SA | 615 Sqn | DSO, DFC**(UK), DFC (US) | Born Pampoenpoort, Cape Province, South Africa, 20 December 1917; CO 41 Sqn 20 November 1941 – 12 April 1942; Sqn Ldr(WS), July 1942; retired as Sqn Ldr, Feb 1950, retaining Gp Capt; died 6 June 1986 at Victoria West, Karoo. |
| Hulbert, Donald James | Sgt | BR | 257 & 501 Sqns | | |
| Hulbert, Frank Horace Raymond | Sgt | BR | 601 Sqn | AFC | |
| Hull, Caesar Barrand | Sqn Ldr | RHO | 263 & 43 Sqns | DFC | KIA 7 September 1940 |
| Humpherson, John Bernard William | Flt Lt | BR | 32 & 602 Sqns | DFC | KIA 22 June 1941 |
| Humphrey, Andrew Henry | Plt Off | BR | 266 Sqn | OBE, DFC, AFC | Died 24 January 1977 |
| Humphreys, Jack David | Plt Off | BR | 29 Sqn | DFC | KIA 2 August 1942 |
| Humphreys, James Samuel | Plt Off | NZ | 605 Sqn | | Died 1992 |
| Humphreys, Peter Cecil | Plt Off | BR | 32 Sqn | | |
| Humphreys, Peter Harry | Fg Off | BR | 152 Sqn | DFC | KIFA 11 November 1947 |
| Hunt, Douglas Alfred Charles | Sgt | BR | 66 Sqn | | |
| Hunt, David Walter | Plt Off | BR | 257 Sqn | | |
| Hunt, Henry Norman | Plt Off | BR | 504 Sqn | | KIA 12 May 1941 |
| Hunter, Alastair Stewart | Flt Lt | BR | 604 Sqn | | KIA 6 February 1941 |
| Hunter, Douglas John | Sgt | BR | 29 Sqn | | Died June 2007. |
| Hunter, Philip Algernon | Sqn Ldr | BR | 264 Sqn | DSO | MIA 24 August 1940 |
| Hunter-Tod, John Hunter | Fg Off | BR | 23 Sqn | | |
| Hurry, Charles Alexander Lyall | Sgt | BR | 43 & 46 Sqn | | |
| Hurst, Peter Richard Scott | Plt Off | BR | 600 Sqn | | KIA 23 October 1940 |
| Hutchinson, David Alexander | Sub Lt (FAA) | BR | 804 NAS | | KIA 15 November 1942 |
| Hutchinson, Iain | Sgt | BR | 222 Sqn | | Died 27 April 2007 |
| Hutley, Richard Ralph | Plt Off | BR | 32 & 213 Sqns | | KIA 29 October 1940 |
| Hutton, Robert Scott | Sgt | BR | 85 Sqn | | KIA 12 December 1940 |
| Hýbler, Josef Emil | Plt Off | CZ | 310 Sqn | | Died 9 January 1984 |
| Hyde, George Gordon | Fg Off | CAN | 1 Sqn RCAF | | KIA 17 May 1941 |
| Hyde, John Woollard | Sgt | BR | 229 Sqn | | |
| Hyde, Reginald Jack | Sgt | NZ | 66 Sqn | | 23 March 1985 |

== I ==
| Name | Rank | Nationality | Sqn during Battle | Awards | Notes |
|---|---|---|---|---|---|
| Ievers, Norman Lancelot | Flt Lt | IRE | 312 Sqn | | |
| Igglesden, Charles Patrick | Fg Off | BR | 234 Sqn | | Born 9 March 1918 |
| Imray, Horace Stanley | Sgt | BR | 600 Sqn | | 20 December 1913 – 2003 aged 89 |
| Ingle, Alec | Fg Off | BR | 605 Sqn | DFC AFC AE | Taken POW on 11 September 1943. |
| Ingle-Finch, Michael Roscoe | Plt Off | BR | 607, 151 & 56 Sqns | DFC AFC | Born 17 June 1920; died 2002, aged 81. |
| Innes, Robert Alexander | Sgt | BR | 253 Sqn | | (Pilot) |
| Inness, Richard Fredrick | Plt Off | BR | 152 Sqn | | Relinquished commission circa 1953; died 27 November 2009. |
| Inniss, Aubrey Richard de Lisle | Fg Off | Barbados | 236 Sqn | DFC | , NOTE: Surname also spelled Inness |
| Ireland, Sydney | Sgt | BR | 610 Sqn | | KIA 12 July 1940 when his Spitfire P9502 lost control in a dive during dogfight practice and crashed at Titsey Park. |
| Irving, Maurice Milne | Flt Lt | Scots | 607 Sqn | | MIA 28 September 1940 aged 29 when his Hurricane R4189 crashed into the Channel near Selsey following combat with Bf 109s. |
| Isaac, Lewis Reginald | Sgt | BR | 64 Sqn | | MIA 5 August 1940 Aged 24 when he failed to return in Spitfire L1029 when his squadron were surprised by fighters over the Channel. |
| Isherwood, Donald William | Sgt | BR | 29 Sqn | | |
| Iveson, Thomas Clifford | Sgt | BR | 616 Sqn | DFC, AE | Surviving aircrew11 September 1919 – 5 November 2013, aged 94 |
| Ivey, Reginald | Sgt | BR | 248 Sqn | DFC | |

== J ==
| Name | Rank | Nationality | Sqn during Battle | Awards | Notes |
|---|---|---|---|---|---|
| Jack, Donald Macfarlane | Fg Off | BR | 602 Sqn | | Died 22 September 2005 |
| Jackson, Arthur | AC2 | BR | 29 Sqn | | KIA 13 October 1940 aged 29 when Blenheim L6637 was shot down by a 312 Squadron Hurricane and crashed in flames off the Point of Aire. |
| Jackson, Patrick Allison Cathcart | Plt Off | BR | 236 Sqn | | |
| Jackson, Peter Frederic | Sgt | BR | 604 Sqn | | Killed on exercise, 29 May 1941. |
| Jacobs, Henry | Plt Off | BR | 219 & 600 Sqns | DFC AFC | |
| Jacobson, Norman | AC2 | BR | 29 Sqn | | MIA 25 August 1940 aged 18 when Blenheim L1330 crashed into the sea following possibly being shot down in combat over Wainfleet. |
| James, Richard Harwood | Sgt | BR | 29 Sqn | | |
| James, Robert Stuart Seymour | Sgt | BR | 248 Sqn | | KIA 29 May 1942 |
| Jameson, Patrick Geraint | Flt Lt | NZ | 266 Sqn (CO) | DSO, DFC | Died September 1996. |
| Janicki, Zbigniew | Plt Off | POL | 32 Sqn | KW** | KIA 13 June 1944 |
| Jankiewicz, Jerzy | Fg Off | POL | 601 Sqn | VM, KW**, DFC | MIA 25 May 1942 |
| Janough, Svatopluk | Plt Off | CZ | 310 Sqn | | Died 12 April 1966 (Surname also spelt "Janouch") |
| Januszewicz, Wojciech | Plt Off | POL | 303 Sqn | VM, KW** | KIA 5 October 1940 when his Hurricane P3892 crashed at Stowing following combat with BF 109s. |
| Jarrett, Raymond Walter Emlyn | Sgt | BR | 501 & 245 Sqns | | Died 10 August 1984 |
| Jaške, Josef Antonín | Plt Off | CZ | 312 Sqn | | Died 20 June 2001 |
| Jastrzebski, Franciszek | Flt Lt | POL | 302 Sqn | VM, KW** | KIA 25 October 1940 when Hurricane V7593 failed to return from a patrol over the Channel. |
| Javaux, Lucien Leon Gustav | Plt Off | BEL | 235 Sqn | | KIA 18 October 1943 |
| Jay, Dudley Trevor | Plt Off | BR | 87 Sqn | | KIA 24 October 1940 when his Hurricane P3404 collided with another Hurricane during a routine patrol. Jay baled out but failed to pull the ripcord and was killed, it is thought he may have hit the tailplane. |
| Jebb, Michael | Fg Off | BR | 504 Sqn | | KIA 19 September 1940 when he died of injuries following a crash of Hurricane P2705 near Dartford on 15 September 1940 after combat over south-east London. |
| Jeff, Robert Voase | Flt Lt | BR | 87 Sqn | DFC* | MIA 11 August 1940 when he was last seen diving to attack enemy aircraft of Portland Bill in Hurricane V7231. |
| Jeffcoat, Harry Jeffrey | Plt Off | BR | 236 Sqn | | KIA 13 December 1941 |
| Jefferson, George | Sgt | BR | 43 Sqn | | |
| Jefferson, Stanley Francis | Plt Off | BR | 248 Sqn | | |
| Jeffery-Cridge, Hugh Ronald | Sgt | BR | 236 Sqn | | |
| Jefferys, George William | Sgt | BR | 46 & 43 Sqns | | KIA 18 September 1940 |
| Jeffrey, Alistair John Oswald | Fg Off | BR | 64 Sqn | DFC | KIA 25 July 1940 |
| Jeffries, Charles Gordon St David | Plt Off | BR | 3 & 232 Sqns | DFC** | Died January 1985. |
| Jeka, Jozef | Sgt | POL | 238 Sqn | VM, KW***, DFM | |
| Jenkins, David Nicholas Owen | Plt Off | BR | 253 Sqn | | KIA 30 August 1940 |
| Jennings, Bernard James | Sgt | BR | 213 Sqn | AFC, DFM | |
| Jeram, Dennis Mayvore | Sub Lt (FAA) | BR | 213 Sqn | | |
| Jereczek, Edmund Wincenty | Plt Off | POL | 229 & 43 Sqns | | Died 26 August 1984 |
| Jessop, Ernest Robert | Sgt | BR | 253, 111, 43 & 257 Sqns | | KIFA 15 December 1941 |
| Jícha, Václav | Plt Off | CZ | 1 Sqn | | KIFA 1 February 1945 |
| Jiroudek, Miroslav | Flt Sgt | CZ | 310 Sqn | | Died 25 March 1995 |
| Johns, George Binmore | Sgt | BR | 229 Sqn | | |
| Johnson, Allan Edward | Sgt | BR | 23 Sqn | | |
| Johnson, Allan Everitt | Plt Off | BR | 46 Sqn | | KIA 4 July 1943 |
| Johnson, Charles Alexander | Sgt | BR | 25 Sqn | | Died 5 May 1945. |
| Johnson, Charles Edward | Plt Off | BR | 264 Sqn | | KIA 28 August 1940 |
| Johnson, Gerald Bruce | Sgt | NZ | 23 Sqn | | KIFA 28 May 1941 |
| Johnson, Joseph Inkerman "Joe" | Sgt | BR | 222 Sqn | | KIA 30 August 1940 |
| Johnson, James Edgar "Johnnie" | Plt Off | BR | 616 Sqn | CB, CBE, DSO**, DFC* | Died 30 January 2001. |
| Johnson, Ronald Arthur | Sgt | BR | 43 Sqn | DFC | |
| Johnson, Reginald Bernard | Sgt | BR | 222 Sqn | | |
| Johnson, Richard Kenneth Howard | Sgt | BR | 235 Sqn | | KIA 31 January 1945 |
| Johnson, Sydney Frederick Farquhar | Plt Off | BR | 600 Sqn | | KIA 26 February 1941 |
| Johnson, William John | Sgt | BR | 145 Sqn | DFC | |
| Johnston, James Thomas | Plt Off | CAN | 151 Sqn | | KIA 15 August 1940 |
| Johnstone, Alexander Vallance Riddell "Sandy" | Sqn Ldr | BR | 602 Sqn (CO) | DFC | Died 13 December 2000. |
| Joll, Ian Kenneth Sefton | Plt Off | BR | 604 Sqn | DFC | |
| Jones, Cyril Arthur Trevor | Plt Off | BR | 611 Sqn | DFC | |
| Jones, Denys Allan Evan | Fg Off | BR | 3 & 501 Sqns | | |
| Jones, Edwin | Sgt | BR | 29 Sqn | | KIFA 19 December 1940 |
| Jones, Herbert Daniel Baynton | Sgt | BR | 504 Sqn | | KIA 6 July 1941 |
| Jones, John Sinclair Bucknall | Plt Off | BR | 152 Sqn | | KIA 11 August 1940 |
| Jones, Joseph Trevor | Plt Off | BR | 264 Sqn | | KIA 24 August 1940 |
| Jones, Richard Leoline | Plt Off | BR | 64 & 19 Sqns | | Surviving aircrew |
| Jones, Robert Eric | Plt Off | BR | 605 Sqn | | |
| Jones, William Ross | Plt Off | BR | 266 Sqn | AFC | |
| Jottard, Alexis Rene Isidore Ghislain | Plt Off | BEL | 145 Sqn | | KIA 27 October 1940 |
| Joubert, Charles Cecil Olivier | Plt Off | BR | 56 Sqn | | |
| Jowitt, Leonard | Sgt | BR | 85 Sqn | | KIA 12 July 1940 |
| Juleff, John Rushworth | Plt Off | BR | 600 Sqn | | Died 1977. |

== K ==
| Name | Rank | Nationality | Sqn during Battle | Awards | Notes |
|---|---|---|---|---|---|
| Kahn, Arthur Harold Evans | Plt Off | BR | 248 Sqn | | KIA 15 June 1944 |
| Kane, Terence Michael | Fg Off | BR | 234 Sqn | | Taken POW after crashing 23 September 1940. Surviving aircrew |
| Kania, Jozef | Flt Sgt | CZ | 303 Sqn | | |
| Karasek, Laurence Robert | Sgt | BR | 23 Sqn | | KIA 25 September 1940 as part of the crew of Blenheim L8369 when it stalled and crashed on approach to landing near Stourbridge. |
| Karubin, Stanislaw | Sgt | POL | 303 Sqn | VM, KW**, DFM | KIA 12 August 1941 |
| Karwowski, Wlodzimierz Eugeniusz | Plt Off | POL | 302 Sqn | KW** | Died 27 April 1985. |
| Kaucký, Jan | Sgt | CZ | 310 Sqn | | Died 23 August 1970. |
| Kawalecki, Tadeusz Wilhelm | Plt Off | POL | 151 Sqn | | |
| Kay, Archibald | Sgt | BR | 248 Sqn | | MIA 13 September 1940 |
| Kay, Desmond Hayward Sidley | Plt Off | BR | 264 Sqn | DFC* | KIA 19 October 1944 |
| Kay, Jack Kininmonth | Plt Off | BR | 111 & 257 Sqns | | Died 18 September 1981 |
| Richard Kay-Shuttleworth, 2nd Baron Shuttleworth | Fg Off | BR | 248 Sqn | | MIA 13 September 1940 |
| Kayll, Joseph Robert "Joe" | Sqn Ldr | BR | 615 Sqn | DSO, DFC, OBE, AE | Died 3 March 2000. |
| Keard, John Alexander | Plt Off | BR | 235 Sqn | | KIA 4 May 1944 |
| Kearsey, Albert Wallace | Sgt | BR | 152 Sqn | | |
| Kearsey, Philip James | Plt Off | BR | 607 & 213 Sqns | | KIA 29 January 1941 |
| Keast, Francis John | Sgt | BR | 600 Sqn | | KIA 8 August 1940 (Air Gunner) |
| Keatings, John "Bugs" | Sgt | BR | 219 Sqn | | Died 16 February 2010. |
| Kee, Ernest Harold Clarke | Sgt | BR | 253 Sqn | DFC | KIA 20 April 1944 (Pilot) |
| Keel, George Ernest | Sgt | BR | 235 Sqn | | KIA 9 October 1940 (Wireless Operator/Air Gunner) |
| Keeler, Rob Roy Gibbons | Sgt | BR | 236 Sqn | | |
| Keighley, Geoffrey | Plt Off | BR | 610 Sqn | OBE | |
| Kellett, Michael | Fg Off | BR | 111 Sqn | DFC | |
| Kellett, Ronald Gustave | Sqn Ldr | BR | 249 & 303 Sqns (CO) | DFC, DSO, VM, AE* | Died 12 November 1998. |
| Kellitt, William Henry | Sgt | BR | 236 Sqn | | Died January 1984. |
| Kellow, Raymond Alan | Flt Lt | BR | 213 Sqn | | Died 2 February 2010 |
| Kells, Lionel George Hosford | Plt Off | BR | 29 Sqn | | MIA 21 February 1941 |
| Kelly, Dillon Piers Denis Gerard | Flt Lt | BR | 74 Sqn | DFC | Died 11 February 1987 |
| Kelsey, Eric Norman | Sgt | BR | 611 Sqn | | MIA 19 January 1941 |
| Kemp, John Leslie | Plt Off | BR | 54 Sqn | | |
| Kemp, John Richard | Plt Off | NZ | 141 Sqn | | MIA 19 July 1940 |
| Kemp, Nigel Leslie Digby | Plt Off | BR | 242 Sqn | DFC | |
| Kendal, John Bedford | Plt Off | BR | 66 Sqn | | KIA 25 May 1942 |
| Kennard, Hugh Charles | Fg Off | BR | 66 Sqn | DFC | Died 1995 |
| Kennard-Davis, Peter Frank | Plt Off | BR | 64 Sqn | | WIA 10 August 1940 |
| Kenner, Peter Lewis | Plt Off | BR | 264 Sqn | | KIA 28 August 1940 |
| Kennett, Peter | Plt Off | BR | 3 Sqn | | KIA 1 April 1941 |
| Kensall, George | AC | BR | 25 Sqn | | KIA 11 April 1943 (Air Gunner) |
| Kent, John Alexander "Johnnie" | Sqn Ldr | CAN | 303 & 92 Sqns | DFC*, AFC, VM | Died 7 October 1985. |
| Kent, Raymond Dugdale | Plt Off | BR | 235 Sqn | | |
| Keogh, Vernon Charles "Shorty" | Plt Off | AME | 609 Sqn | | MIA 15 February 1941 (NOTE: Surname also spelled Keough) |
| Keprt, Josef | Sgt | CZ | 312 Sqn | | Died 29 July 1976. |
| Ker-Ramsay, Robert Gerald | Flt Lt | BR | 25 Sqn & FIU | MBE | POW 13 September 1940; Blenheim Z5721 of FIU crashed in Channel off Calais during night patrol (circumstances unknown); Ker-Ramsay, W/Os George Dixon, and "Paddy" Byrne baled out and were captured. |
| Kershaw, Anthony | Plt Off | BR | 1 Sqn | | KIA 19 March 1941 |
| Kerwin, John William | Fg Off | CAN | 401 Sqn | | KIFA 16 July 1942 in Canada, aged 24 |
| Kestin, Ian Herbert | Sub Lt (FAA) | BR | 145 Sqn | | MIA 1 August 1940 |
| Kestler, Oldřich | Sgt | CZ | 111 Sqn | | KIA 7 April 1941 (Pilot) |
| Keymer, Michael | Sgt | BR | 65 Sqn | | KIA 22 August 1940 |
| Keynes, John Douglas | Sgt | BR | 236 Sqn | | KIA 4 June 1943 |
| Kidson, Rudal | Plt Off | NZ | 141 Sqn | | MIA 19 July 1940 |
| Killick, Peter | Sgt | BR | 245 Sqn | | |
| Killingback, Frederick William George | Sgt | BR | 249 Sqn | | |
| Kilmartin, John Ignatius "Killy" | Fg Off | IRE | 43 Sqn | DFC | Died 1 October 1998. |
| Kilner, Joseph Richard | Sgt | BR | 65 Sqn | | Died 11 May 1986. |
| Kinder, Douglas Steele | Plt Off | BR | 73 Sqn | | |
| Kinder, Maurice Craig | Plt Off | BR | 607 Sqn | AFC | |
| Kindersley, Alistair Thomas James | Lt (FAA) | BR | 808 NAS | | KIA 25 July 1941 |
| King, Eric Bruce | Sqn Ldr | BR | 249 & 151 Sqns | | KIA 30 August 1940 |
| King, Frederick Harry | Plt Off | BR | 264 Sqn | DFM | KIA 24 August 1940 |
| King, Leonard Frank Douglas | Fg Off | BR | 64 Sqn | | MIA 19 March 1945 |
| King, Martyn Aurel | Plt Off | BR | 249 Sqn | | KIA 16 August 1940 |
| King, Peter James Christopher | Fg Off | BR | 66 Sqn | | KIA 5 September 1940 (Parachute failed to open) |
| King, William Lawrence | Plt Off | BR | 236 Sqn | | KIA 22 January 1943 |
| Kingaby, Donald Ernest | Sgt | BR | 266 & 92 Sqns | DSO, AFC, DFM | Died 31 December 1990 |
| Kingcombe, Charles Brian Fabris | Flt Lt | BR | 92 Sqn | DFC*, DSO | Died at age 76 |
| Kings, Robert Austin | Plt Off | BR | 238 Sqn | | Surviving aircrew (born 1914) |
| Kirk, Thomas Brian | Sgt | BR | 74 Sqn | | WIA 20 October 1940; died 22 July 1941. |
| Kirkpatrick, James Charles | Plt Off | BEL | 235 Sqn | | MIA 9 October 1940 |
| Kirkwood, Mark Tyzack | Plt Off | BR | 610 Sqn | | MIA 8 November 1940 |
| Kirton, David Ian | Sgt | BR | 65 Sqn | | KIA 8 August 1940 (Pilot) |
| Kita, Szymon | Sgt | POL | 85 & 253 Sqns | KW* | |
| Kitson, Thomas Roy | Plt Off | BR | 245 Sqn | | KIA 13 March 1941 |
| Klein, Zygmunt | Sgt | POL | 234 & 152 Sqns | KW* | MIA 28 November 1940 |
| Kleczkowski, Stefan | Plt Off | POL | 302 Sqn | KW | |
| Klozinski, Wojciech | Sgt | POL | 54 Sqn | KW* | NOTE: Changed name to V K Stewart in 1945 when he emigrated to Canada. |
| Knight, Roland Anthony Lee | Flt Lt | BR | 23 Sqn | DFC | KIA 27 September 1941 |
| Knocker, William Rodney Alexander | Fg Off | BR | 264 Sqn | OBE | |
| Komaroff, Lennert Aexel | Sgt | BR | 141 Sqn | | KIA 19 September 1944 (Navigator) |
| Komínek, Josef | Flt Sgt | CZ | 310 Sqn | Czech MC | KIA 8 June 1941 (Pilot) |
| Kopecký, Miroslav | Sgt | CZ | 111 & 253 Sqns | | Died 19 August 1983. |
| Kopřiva, Josef | Sgt | CZ | 310 Sqn | | Died 23 June 1976. |
| Körber, Karel | Sgt | CZ | 32 Sqn | | MIA 3 May 1943 |
| Kordula, František | Plt Off | CZ | 17 & 1 Sqns | | Died 18 September 1979. |
| Kosarz, Wilhelm | Sgt | POL | 302 Sqn | KW | KIA 8 November 1940 |
| Kosinski, Kazimierz Bronislaw | Flt Lt | POL | 32 Sqn | VM, KW* | MIA 26 January 1942 |
| Koukal, Josef | Sgt | CZ | 310 Sqn | | WIA 7 September 1940; died 23 February 1980. |
| Kowalski, Jan | Sgt | POL | 303 Sqn | VM, KW**, DFC | |
| Kowalski, Julian | Fg Off | POL | 302 Sqn | VM, KW***, DFC | |
| Kozlowski, Franciszek | Plt Off | POL | 501 Sqn | KW*** | KIA 13 March 1943 |
| Kramer, Marcus | Plt Off | BR | 600 Sqn | DFC | KIA 21 May 1941 |
| Krasnodebski, Zdzislaw | Sqn Ldr | POL | 303 Sqn | VM, KW | Died 3 July 1980 in Toronto, Canada. |
| Krátkoruký, Bedřich | Sgt | CZ | 1 Sqn | | MIA 15 January 1943 |
| Kredba, Miroslav | Flt Lt | CZ | 310 Sqn | | KIFA 14 February 1942 (Training) |
| Krepski, Walenty | Plt Off | POL | 54 Sqn | | MIA 7 September 1940 |
| Krol, Waclaw Szczepan | Plt Off | POL | 302 Sqn | VM, KW***, DFC, CdeG | Died 15 June 1991 in Warsaw |
| Kučera, Jaroslav | Sgt | CZ | 245 Sqn | | KIA 19 December 1941 |
| Kučera, Jiří | Sgt | CZ | 238 Sqn | | Died 24 January 1980. |
| Kučera, Otmar | Sgt | CZ | 111 Sqn | | |
| Kumiega, Tadeusz Leon | Plt Off | BR | 17 Sqn | KW* | |
| Kustrzynski, Zbigniew | Fg Off | POL | 607 Sqn | KW | Taken POW 4 April 1942; escaped 1 February 1945. |
| Kuttelwascher, Karel | Sgt | CZ | 1 Sqn | DFC* | 1916 – 17 August 1959. |
| Kwiecinski, Jozef | Sgt | POL | 145 Sqn | KW | MIA 12 August 1940 |

== Notes on table ==
- Ranks given are those held during the Battle of Britain, although a higher rank may have been achieved after the Battle.
- All individuals listed in bold and highlighted in silver are believed to be still alive.
- Aircrew listed as KIA, MIA, WIA or KIFA during the Battle of Britain are highlighted in blue.
- The awards listed include those made during the Battle of Britain and during the remainder of World War II, as well as any made post-war.
- In order to limit the numbers of footnotes which would otherwise be required, the symbol ‡ under "Notes" indicates several entries in the text of Ramsay 1989, while the symbol † indicates that information on the circumstances under which an airman became a casualty during the Battle is included in the text of the book. Where more than one crew member of a multi place aircraft was involved this is included as a cross-reference under "Notes"
- In addition to 2,353 British aircrew, the RAF Roll of Honour recognises 574 personnel from other countries; namely:

Australia, Barbados, Belgium, Canada, Czechoslovakia, France, Ireland, Jamaica, Newfoundland, New Zealand, Poland, Rhodesia, South Africa and the United States.

=== Abbreviations ===
- (CO) after "Sqn" denotes Commanding Officer of that squadron, as per the RAF Fighter Command Order of Battle on 15 September 1940, unless otherwise indicated.
- (FAA) after a rank denotes a member of the Fleet Air Arm rather than the RAF.
- "KIA" – "killed in action"
- "KIFA" – "killed in flying accident", i.e. not during combat
- "MIA" – "missing in action".
- "WIA" – "wounded in action" leading to death which, in some cases, may have occurred months later.
- "POW" – "prisoner of war".
- For details of RAF rank abbreviations, see RAF Commissioned Officer Ranks and RAF Non-Commissioned Officer Ranks.
- For details of FAA rank abbreviations, see FAA Commissioned Officer Ranks.

=== Nationalities ===
| AME | American |
| AUS | Australian |
| BEL | Belgian |
| BR | British |
| CAN | Canadian |
| CZ | Czechoslovak |
| FR | French |
| IRE | Irish |
| NZ | New Zealander |
| POL | Poland |
| RHO | Rhodesian |
| SA | South African |

=== Awards ===
| Award | Title | Notes |
|---|---|---|
| AE | Air Efficiency Award | Awarded for ten years' efficient service in the Royal Auxiliary Air Force |
| AFC | Air Force Cross | Awarded for "an act or acts of valour, courage or devotion to duty whilst flying, though not in active operations against the enemy". |
| CB | Companion of The Order of the Bath | Awarded at the monarch's pleasure |
| CDeG | Croix de Guerre | A military decoration of both France and Belgium, also commonly bestowed to foreign military forces allied to France and Belgium. |
| CdeL | Croix de la Libération | A decoration of France awarded for very meritorious conduct with the Free French Forces during World War II. |
| CdeLd'H | Croix de Légion d'honneur | A decoration of France awarded for excellent civil or military conduct delivered, upon official investigation. |
| CdeLL | Croix de L'Ordre de Leopold | Awarded to Belgian nationals or some distinguished foreign persons who made very important contributions to the Belgian state or society. |
| DFC | Distinguished Flying Cross | Awarded to Royal Air Force commissioned officers and Warrant Officers for "an act or acts of valour, courage or devotion to duty whilst flying in active operations against the enemy". |
| DFC* | Distinguished Flying Cross and Bar | A bar is added to the ribbon for holders of the DFC who received a second award. |
| DFC** | Distinguished Flying Cross and Bar | A second bar is added to the ribbon for holders of the DFC and Bar who received a third award. |
| DFM | Distinguished Flying Medal | Awarded to military below commissioned rank, for "an act or acts of valour, courage or devotion to duty whilst flying in active operations against the enemy". |
| DSO | Distinguished Service Order | Awarded for meritorious or distinguished service by officers of the armed forces during wartime, typically in actual combat. |
| DSO* | Distinguished Service Order and Bar | A bar is added to the ribbon for holders of the DSO who received a second award. |
| DSO** | Distinguished Service Order and Two Bars | A second bar is added to the ribbon for holders of the DSO and Bar who received a third award. |
| GCB | Knight Grand Cross of The Order of the Bath | Awarded at the monarch's pleasure |
| KCVO | Knight Commander of the Royal Victorian Order | Awarded for personal service to the sovereign |
| KStJ | Knight of the Order of Saint John | |
| KW | Krzyz Walecznych, Polish "Cross of Valour" | Awarded to an individual who "has demonstrated deeds of valour and courage on the field of battle." |
| KZ | Krzyz Zaslugi, Polish "Cross of Merit" | Awarded for exemplary public service or humanitarian work that goes above and beyond the call of duty. |
| MBE | Member of the Order of the British Empire | Awarded at the monarch's pleasure |
| MC | Military Cross | Awarded for "an act or acts of exemplary gallantry during active operations against the enemy on land to all members, of any rank". |
| MM | Military Medal | Awarded for acts of gallantry and devotion to duty under fire |
| OBE | Officer of the Order of the British Empire | Awarded at the monarch's pleasure |
| OStJ | Officer of the Order of Saint John | |
| VC | Victoria Cross | Highest British military decoration, awarded for valour in the face of the enemy. |
| VM | Virtuti Militari | Highest Polish military award for courage in the face of the enemy. |

== See also ==
- Non-British personnel in the RAF during the Battle of Britain
- List of World War II aces from the United Kingdom
- List of World War II flying aces by country
- List of World War II flying aces
- List of RAF aircrew in the Battle of Britain (A–C)
- List of RAF aircrew in the Battle of Britain (D–F)
- List of RAF aircrew in the Battle of Britain (L–N)
- List of RAF aircrew in the Battle of Britain (O–R)
- List of RAF aircrew in the Battle of Britain (S–U)
- List of RAF aircrew in the Battle of Britain (V–Z)

== Bibliography ==
- Ramsay, Winston, ed. The Battle of Britain Then and Now Mk V. London: Battle of Britain Prints International Ltd, 1989. ISBN 0-900913-46-0.
- Ringlstetter, Herbert (2005). Helmut Wick, An Illustrated Biography of the Luftwaffe Ace And Commander of Jagdgeschwader 2 During The Battle of Britain. Atglen, PA: Schiffer Publishing. ISBN 0-7643-2217-6.
- Remembering the Battle of Britain
- Robert Dixon, '607 Squadron: A Shade of Blue'. The History Press 2008. ISBN 978-0-7524-4531-1
- Robert Dixon, 'A Gathering of Eagles' PublishBritannica 2004, ISBN 1-4137-3498-7
