= List of RAF aircrew in the Battle of Britain (D–F) =

The following is a list of pilots and other aircrew who flew during the Battle of Britain, and were awarded the Battle of Britain Clasp to the 1939–45 Star by flying at least one authorised operational sortie with an eligible unit of the Royal Air Force or Fleet Air Arm during the period from 0001 hours on 10 July to 2359 hours 31 October 1940.

== History ==
In 1942, the Air Ministry made the decision to compile a list from records of the names of pilots who had lost their lives as a result of the fighting during the Battle of Britain (Note: This was initially regarded as being from 8 August to 31 October 1940; however, the dates were later amended to also include those who lost their lives between 10 July and 7 August.) for the purpose of building a national memorial. This became the Battle of Britain Chapel at Westminster Abbey, which was unveiled by King George VI on 10 July 1947. The Roll of Honour within the Chapel contains the names of 1,497 pilots and aircrew killed or mortally wounded during the Battle.

Nothing was done officially, however, to define the qualifications for the classification of a Battle of Britain airman until 9 November 1960. AMO N850, published by the Air Ministry, stated for the first time the requirements for the awarding of the Battle of Britain Star, and listed the 71 units which were deemed to have been under the control of RAF Fighter Command.

In 1955 Flt Lt John Holloway, a serving RAF officer, began a personal challenge to compile a complete list of "The Few". After fourteen years of research Flt Lt Holloway had 2,946 names on the list. Of these airmen, 537 were killed during the Battle or later died of wounds received.

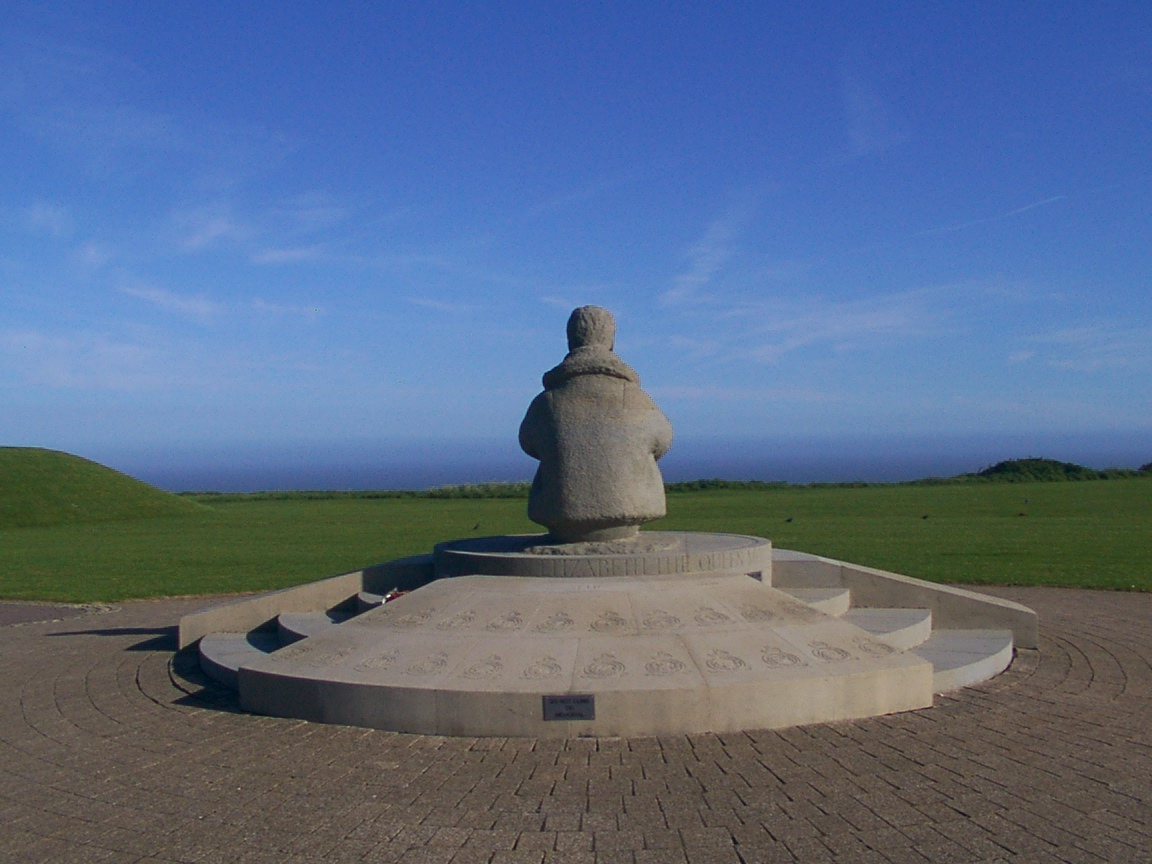
Battle of Britain Memorial at Capel-le-Ferne

The Battle of Britain Memorial Trust, founded by Geoffrey Page, raised funds for the construction of the Battle of Britain Memorial at Capel-le-Ferne near Folkestone in Kent. The Memorial, unveiled by Queen Elizabeth The Queen Mother on 9 July 1993, shares the site with the Christopher Foxley-Norris Memorial Wall on which a complete list of "The Few" is engraved.

More recently, the Battle of Britain Monument on the Victoria Embankment in London was unveiled on 18 September 2005 by Charles, Prince of Wales and his wife Camilla, Duchess of Cornwall. The idea for the monument was conceived by the Battle of Britain Historical Society which then set about raising funds for its construction. The outside of the monument is lined with bronze plaques listing all the Allied airmen who took part in the Battle.

== D ==
Name	Rank	Nationality	Sqn during Battle	Awards	Notes
Dafforn, Robert Chippendall	Fg Off	BR	501 Sqn	DFC	KIA 9 September 1943
Dale, Peter Alan	Sgt	BR	141 Sqn		KIA 13 December 1941
Dalton, Robert William	Sgt	BR	604 Sqn		
Dalton-Morgan, Thomas Frederick	Flt Lt	BR	43 Sqn	DSO, OBE, DFC*	Official Ace
Daly, John J	Sgt	BR	141 Sqn		
Dann, James Edwin	Sgt	BR	23 Sqn		Died 1986
Dannatt, Alexander George	AC2	BR	29 Sqn		Died 16 December 1982
D'Arcy-Irvine, Brian William Jesse	Fg Off	BR	257 Sqn		MIA 8 August 1940
Dargie, Albert McDonald Smith	Sgt	BR	23 Sqn		KIA 13 July 1941
Darley, Horace Stanley "George"	Sqn Ldr	BR	609 Sqn (CO)		Official Ace
Darling, Andrew Smitton	Sgt	BR	611 & 603 Sqns		KIA 26 April 1941
Darling, Edward Vivian "Mitzi"	Sgt	BR	41 Sqn	DFC	Official Ace. Born Wellington, India, 11 October 1914. Commissioned Jan 1941; MIA 2 June 1942; remembered on Panel 65 of the Runnymede Memorial
Darwin, Christopher William Warton	Plt Off	BR	87 Sqn		KIA 7 August 1942; Son of Sqn Ldr Charles John Wharton Darwin DSO RAF who was also KIA 26 December 1941.
Daszewski, Jan Kazimierz Michal	Plt Off	POL	303 Sqn	VM, KW***	KIA 4 April 1942
Davey, Brian	Plt Off	BR	504, 32 & 254 Sqns		KIA 12 June 1941
Davey, John Arthur Joseph	Plt Off	BR	1 Sqn		KIA 11 August 1940; Awarded a Cadetship to the RAF College Cranwell from RAF Halton.
David, William Dennis	Flt Lt	BR	87 & 213 Sqns	DFC*	11 kills during the Battle of France
Davidson, Henry John	Sgt	BR	249 Sqn		Official Ace, KIFA 6 October 1942
Davies, Alfred Eric	Plt Off	BR	610 & 222 Sqns		KIA 30 October 1940
Davies, Graham Gordon Ayerst	Plt Off	BR	222 Sqn	DFC	
Davies, John Alfred	Sqn Ldr	BR	604 Sqn		KIA 6 October 1940
Davies, John William	Sgt	BR	600 Sqn		KIA 7 September 1940
Davies, Leonard	Sgt	BR	151 Sqn		
Davies, Maurice Peter	Sgt	BR	1 & 213 Sqns		Died 22 July 1953
Davies, Peter Frederick McDonald	Fg Off	BR	56 Sqn		
Davies, Roy Blackburne	Fg Off	BR	29 Sqn		Died 1972
Davies-Cooke, Paul John	Fg Off	BR	72 & 610 Sqns		KIA 27 September 1940
Davis, Alfred Stewart	Sgt	BR	235 Sqn		
Davis, Carl Raymond	Fg Off	AME	601 Sqn		KIA 6 September 1940
Davis, Charles Trevor	Fg Off	BR	238 Sqn		Official Ace, KIA 26 March 1941
Davis, Jack	Sgt	BR	54 Sqn		
Davis, J N	Sgt	BR	600 Sqn		
Davis, Peter Edgar	Sgt	BR	236 Sqn		
Davis, Philip Oscar	Sgt	BR	222 Sqn		KIA 10 August 1943
Davis, William Lee	Sgt	BR	249 Sqn		Captured & taken POW 10 February 1941; Died 18 March 1941.
Davison, John Tregonwell	Plt Off	BR	235 Sqn		Died 9 October 1981
Davy, Thomas Daniel Humphrey	Fg Off	BR	266 & 72 Sqns	DFC	KIA 13 September 1942
Daw, Victor George	Fg Off	BR	32 Sqn		Killed 24 March 1953
Dawbarn, Peter Leslie	Plt Off	BR	17 Sqn		Died 4 July 2009
Dawick, Kenneth	Sgt	NZ	111 Sqn		
Dawson, Thomas 0-	Sgt	BR	235 Sqn		
Day, Frank Samuel	Sgt	BR	248 Sqn		KIA 24 July 1942
Day, Robert Lionel Frank	Fg Off	BR	141 Sqn	DFC	KIA 18 June 1944
Deacon, Arthur Harry	Sgt	BR	85 & 111 Sqns		
Deansley, Edward Christopher	Flt Lt	BR	152 Sqn		
Debenham, Kenneth Barry Lempriere	Plt Off	BR	151 Sqn		KIA 16 December 1943
Debree, ?	Plt Off	BR	264 Sqn		Service Details unknown
Dee, Orlando John	Sgt	BR	235 Sqn		KIA 28 May 1941
Deere, Alan Christopher	Flt Lt	NZ	54 Sqn	DFC*, DSO, CdeG, OBE, ADC	Died 21 September 1995
De Grunne, Compte Rudolph Ghislain Charles de Hemricourt	Plt Off	BEL	32 Sqn		KIA 25 May 1942
De Hamale, R E	Sgt	BEL	46 Sqn		KIA 1 November 1940
De Hemptinne, Baudovin Marie Ghislain	Plt Off	BEL	145 Sqn		KIA 5 May 1942
De Jace, L J	Plt Off	BEL	236 Sqn		MIA 26 July 1942
De la Boucher, Francois Henri Edmond Joseph Andre	Adj	FF	85 Sqn		KIA 5 September 1942
De la Perelle, Victor Breton	Plt Off	NZ	245 Sqn		Died 11 June 1983
Deller, Alan Lawrence Martin	Sgt	BR	43 Sqn		
De Mancha, Ricardo Adriani	Plt Off	BR	43 Sqn		MIA 21 July 1940
Demetriadi, Richard Stephen	Fg Off	BR	601 Sqn		KIA 11 August 1940; Son of Sir Stephen and Lady Demetriadi, attached to the King's Estate at Sandringham.
De Montbron, Xavier de Cherade	Sgt	FF	64 Sqn		Died 21 April 1955
Demoulin, Rene Jean Ghislain	Sgt	BEL	235 Sqn	CdeLL CdeG	KIA 6 April 1944
Demozay, Jean	2nd Lt	FR	1 Sqn		KIFA 19 December 1945
Denby, Gordon Alfred	Plt Off	BR	600 Sqn	DFC	MIA 12 December 1942
Denchfield, Herbert David	Sgt	BR	610 Sqn		Surviving aircrew
Denholm, George Lovell	Sqn Ldr	BR	603 Sqn (CO)		
Denison, Richard Warren	Flt Lt	CAN	236 Sqn		Killed 6 February 1951
Denton, Denis Austin	Sgt	BR	236 Sqn		KIA 30 August 1944
Derbyshire, John Montague	Plt Off	BR	236 Sqn		
De Scitivaux, Charles Jean Marie Phillipe	Capt	FR	245 Sqn		Died 10 August 1986
Desloges, Jean Paul Joseph	Flt Lt	CAN	1 Sqn RCAF		KIA 8 May 1944
De Spirlet, Francois Xavier Egenoff	Plt Off	BEL	87 Sqn		26 June 1942
Deuntzer, Derrick Canut	Sgt	BR	247 Sqn		
Devitt, Peter Kenneth	Sqn Ldr	BR	152 Sqn (CO)		
Dewar, John Scatliffe	Wg Cdr	BR	87 & 213 Sqns	DSO DFC	KIA 12 September 1940
Dewar, John Michael Firth	Plt Off	BR	229 Sqn		KIA 30 March 1941
Dewey, Robert Basil	Plt Off	BR	611 & 603 Sqn		KIA 27 October 1940
Dewhurst, Kenneth Shortland	Fg Off	BR	234 Sqn		
Dexter, Peter Grenfell	Sqn Ldr	BR	603 & 54 Sqns	DFC	KIA 14 July 1941
Dibnah, Ronald Harold	Plt Off	CAN	1 & 242 Sqns		
Dickie, William Gordon	Plt Off	BR	601 Sqn		MIA 11 August 1940
Dickinson, John Holt	Sgt	BR	253 Sqn		KIA 30 August 1940
Dieu, Giovanni E F	Plt Off	BEL	236 Sqn		
Difford, Ivor Benison	Fg Off	SA	607 Sqn		KIA 7 October 1940
Digby-Worsley, Maxwell Paul	Sgt	BR	248 Sqn		MIA 19 August 1940
Ditzel, John William	Sgt	BR	25 Sqn		
Dixon, Christopher Alexander Wilfred	Sgt	BR	601 Sqn		
Dixon, Frederick John Powell	Sgt	BR	501 Sqn		KIA 11 July 1940 (Pilot)
Dixon, George	Sgt	BR	FIU		POW 13 September 1940; Blenheim Z5721 crashed in Channel off Calais during night patrol (circumstances unknown); Flt Lt Ker-Ramsay, Dixon and W/O "Paddy" Byrne baled out and were captured; Died 28 February 1972.
Dixon, John Antony	Plt Off	BR	1 Sqn		
Dixon, Lawrence	AC2	BR	600 Sqn		
Dobree, Nicholas Robert	Fg Off	BR	264 Sqn		
Dodd, John Dodgson	Plt Off	BR	248 Sqn		MIA 13 December 1940; Chartered Accountant
Dodge, Charles William	Sgt	BR	219 Sqn		Died 1982
Doe, Robert Francis Thomas	Plt Off	BR	234 & 238 Sqns	DSO, DFC*	Died 21 February 2010.
Doležal, František	Plt Off	CZ	19 Sqn	DSO, DFC	KIFA 4 October 1945
Domagala, Marian Boguslaw	Sgt	POL	238 Sqn	KW*	
Don, Ralph Stidston	Plt Off	BR	501 Sqn	DFC	KIA 22 January 1945
Donahue, Arthur Gerald "Art"	Plt Off	AME	64 Sqn		KIA 11 September 1942
Donald, Ian David Grahame	Flt Lt	BR	141 Sqn	DFC	1917-1940 KIA 19 July 1940 when as pilot of Defiant L7009 he was shot down by Bf 109s and crashed at Dover, the Air Gunner Plt Off A.C. Hamilton also killed.
Donaldson, Edward Mortlock "Teddy"	Sqn Ldr	BR	151 Sqn		Official Ace; Died June 1992
Dossett, William Stanley	Sgt	BR	29 Sqn		
Doughty, Neville Anthony Richard	Plt Off	BR	247 Sqn		
Douglas, William Anderson	Plt Off	BR	610 Sqn		
Doulton, Michael Duke	Plt Off	BR	601 Sqn		MIA 31 August 1940
Douthwaite, Basil	Plt Off	BR	72 Sqn		
Doutrepont, Georges Louis Joseph	Plt Off	BEL	229 Sqn		KIA 15 September 1940
Dowding, The Hon. Derek Hugh Tremenheere	Plt Off	BR	74 Sqn		Died 1992; son of Air Chief Marshal Sir Hugh Dowding
Down, John Knight	Sgt	BR	64 & 616 Sqns		Died 2008
Down, Peter Derrick McLeod	Plt Off	BR	56 Sqn		Died 2010?
Drake, Billy	Plt Off	BR	213 Sqn & 421 Flight		Died 28 August 2011
Drake, George James	Plt Off	SA	607 Sqn		KIA 9 September 1940
Draper, Bryan Vincent	Sgt	BR	74 Sqn		Official Ace, KIA 28 February 1945
Draper, Gilbert Graham Fairley	Fg Off	BR	41 & 610 Sqns		Born 7 December 1921, Rutland. Commissioned October 1939; shot down & baled out near Lille, France, and captured, 7 August 1941; released 1945; died 1997.
Draper, R A	Sgt	BR	232 Sqn		
Dredge, Allan Sydney	Sgt	BR	253 Sqn	DSO DFC	KIFA 18 May 1945
Drever, Nigel George	Fg Off	BR	610 Sqn		Surviving aircrew
Drew, Peter Edward	Sqn Ldr	BR	236 Sqn		KIA 1 August 1940
Drobinski, Boleslaw H	Plt Off	POL	65 Sqn	VM, KW***	
Drummond, John Fraser	Fg Off	BR	46 & 92 Sqns	DFC	Official Ace, KIA 10 October 1940
Duart, John Howard	Plt Off	BR	219 Sqn		
Dubber, Ronald Edwin	Plt Off (FAA)	BR	808 Sqn		Died 10 September 1951
Duckenfield, Byron Leonard	Plt Off	BR	501 Sqn		Died 19 November 2010
Duda, Josef	Plt Off	CZ	312 Sqn		Died 7 December 1977
Duff, Stanley Sutherland	Plt Off	BR	23 Sqn		
Duke-Woolley, Raymond Myles Beecham Duke	Flt Lt	BR	253 & 23 Sqns		
Dulwich, William Howard	Sgt	BR	235 Sqn		KIA 2 August 1941
Duncan, ?	Sgt	BR	29 Sqn		Service details unknown
Dundas, Hugh Spencer Lisle	Fg Off	BR	616 Sqn	CBE, DSO*, DFC	1920-1995 (Knighted 1987); younger brother of John Dundas
Dundas, John Charles	Plt Off	BR	609 Sqn	DFC and bar	Official Ace, MIA 28 November 1940 (Note: Most likely shot down by Oberleutnant Rudolf Pflanz shortly after Dundas shot down Major Helmut Wick.); older brother of Hugh Dundas
Dunmore, Jack Townley	Sgt	BR	222 Sqn		KIA 17 May 1941
Dunn, Ian Love	Sgt	BR	235 Sqn		died 2/3/2004 Canberra Australia
Dunning-White, Peter William	Fg Off	BR	145 Sqn		Died 2008
Dunscombe, Raymond Douglas	Sgt	BR	213 & 312 Sqns		MIA 31 May 1941
Dunworth, Felix Patrick Raphael	Flt Lt	BR	66 & 54 Sqns (CO)		
Dupee, Osald Arthur	Sgt	BR	219 Sqn		
Durrant, Carroll Ronald	Sgt	NZ	23 Sqn		KIA 28 October 1942
Duryasz, Marian	Flt Lt	POL	213 Sqn	VM, KW*, DFC	
Duszynski, Stanislaw	Sgt	POL	238 Sqn		KIA 11 September 1940
Dutton, G W	Sgt	BR	604 Sqn		
Dutton, Roy Gilbert	Sqn Ldr	BR	145 Sqn	DFC	Official Ace; Died 14 September 1988.
Du Vivier, Reginald Albert Lloyd	Plt Off	BEL	229 Sqn		KIA 30 March 1941
Dvořák, Alois	Sgt	CZ	310 Sqn		KIA 24 September 1941
Dye, Bertram Ernest	Sgt	BR	219 Sqn	DFM*	31 August 1943
Dyer, Henry David Patrick	Sgt	NZ	600 Sqn		KIA 16 July 1941
Dygrýn, Josef	Sgt	CZ	1 Sqn	DFM	KIA 4 June 1942
Dyke, Leslie Arthur	Sgt	BR	64 Sqn		MIA 27 September 1940
Dymond, William Lawrence	Sgt	BR	111 Sqn	DFM	Official Ace, MIA 2 September 1940

== E ==
Name	Rank	Nationality	Sqn during Battle	Awards	Notes
Eade, Arthur William	Sgt	BR	266 & 602 Sqns		
Earp, Richard Llewellyn	Sgt	BR	46 Sqn		
Easton, David Albert	Sgt	BR	248 Sqn		
Eckford, Alan Francis	Flt Lt	BR	23, 253 & 242 Sqns		Official Ace
Edge, Alexander Rothwell	Fg Off	BR	609 Sqn		Died 1985
Edge, Gerald Richmond	Flt Lt	BR	253 & 605 Sqns	DFC	Official Ace
Edgley, Alwyn	Sgt	BR	601 & 253 Sqns		
Edmiston, Guy Arthur Fownes	Plt Off	BR	151 Sqn		Died 1989
Edmond, Norman Douglas	Plt Off	CAN	615 Sqn		KIA 20 April 1941
Edmunds, Eric Ralph	Plt Off	NZ	245 Sqn		Died 2010?
Edridge, Hilary Patrick Michael	Plt Off	BR	222 Sqn		KIA 30 October 1940
Edsall, Eric Frank	Plt Off	BR	54 & 222 Sqns		WIA 12 April 1942
Edwards, A J	AC	BR	604 Sqn		
Edwards, Frederick	AC	BR	29 Sqn		
Edwards, Harry Davies	Plt Off	CAN	92 Sqn		KIA 11 September 1940
Edwards, Harold Harding	Sgt	BR	248 Sqn		
Edwards, Ivor Herbert	Plt Off	BR	234 Sqn		
Edwards, Kenneth Charles	Plt Off	BR	600 Sqn	AE	Died 2010?
Edwards, Robert Lesley	Fg Off	CAN	1 Sqn RCAF		KIA 26 August 1940
Edwards, Robert Sydney James	Flt Lt	IRE	56 Sqn		Died 2 May 1974
Edwards, Malcolm Finney	Sgt	BR	247 Sqn		Joined 247 Sqn on 1 September 1940 until 30 November 1940 where he piloted Gloster Gladiators. He also flew Typhoons and Tempest with 3 F Squadron from October 1943 until his death. Edwards had 12.5 confirmed V-1 Flying Bombs to his name. KIA 29 December 1944 whilst flying Hawker Tempest EJ803 of 3 F Squadron. He is buried in the Reichswald War Cemetery.
Edworthy, Gerald Henry	Sgt	BR	46 Sqn		KIA 3 September 1940
Edy, Allan Laird	Plt Off	CAN	602 Sqn	DFC	KIA 12 December 1941
Eeles, H	Sqn Ldr	BR	263 Sqn		It is believed that Eeles declined the Battle of Britain Clasp because his Sqn did not serve operationally in Southern England during defined period.
Egan, Edward James	Sgt	BR	600 & 501 Sqns		KIA 17 September 1940
Eiby, William Thorpe	Plt Off	NZ	245 Sqn		
Ekins, Victor Howard	Sgt	BR	111 & 501 Sqns		
Elcome, Douglas William	Sgt	BR	602 Sqn		MIA 26 October 1940
Eley, Fredrick William "Tiger Tim"	Sgt	BR	74 Sqn		KIA 31 July 1940
Elger, Frank Richard Charles	Plt Off	BR	248 Sqn		
Eliot, Hugh William	Plt Off	BR	73 Sqn	DSO, DFC	KIA 4 March 1945 (Italy)
Elkington, John Francis Durham "Tim"	Plt Off	BR	1 Sqn		died 1 February 2019
Ellacombe, John Lawrence Wemyss	Plt Off	BR	151 Sqn	CB, DFC*	Surviving aircrew; Retired at the rank of Air Cdre (Born 1920)
Ellery, Cyril Charles	Plt Off	BR	264 Sqn		
Elliott, George J	Plt Off	CAN	607 Sqn		
Elliott, Robert Deacon	Plt Off	BR	72 Sqn		
Ellis, Gordon Eric	Fg Off	BR	64 Sqn		(Discharged 1 February 1941)
Ellis, John	Flt Lt	BR	610 Sqn	DFC	Official Ace
Ellis, John Hugh Mortimer "Cockney Sparrow"	Sgt	BR	85 Sqn		KIA 1 September 1940
Ellis, Ronald Vernon	Flt Sgt	BR	73 Sqn		
Ellis, Walter Thomas	Sgt	BR	92 Sqn		
Elsdon, Harry Donald Buchanan	Sgt	BR	236 Sqn		MIA 18 July 1940
Elsdon, Thomas Arthur Francis	Flt Lt	BR	72 Sqn		
Else, Peter	Sgt	BR	610 Sqn		
Emeny, Clifford Stanley	Sgt	NZ	264 Sqn		Died 2010?
Emmett, Geoffrey	Sgt	BR	236 Sqn		
Emmett, William Alexander Coote	Flt Lt	BR	25 Sqn		Born 1916; Died 2007
English, Charles Edward	Plt Off	BR	85 & 605 Sqns		KIA 7 October 1940
Ensor, Philip Stephen Baddesley	Fg Off	BR	23 Sqn	DFC	KIA 8 September 1941
Etherington, Wilfred John	Sgt	BR	17 Sqn		
Evans, Cecil Roy	Sgt	BR	235 Sqn		MIA 23 March 1941
Evans, David	Plt Off	BR	607 & 615 Sqns		KIFA 28 May 1943 (Testing aircraft)
Evans, George John	Sgt	BR	604 Sqn		
Evans, Harold Arthur Charles	Plt Off	BR	236 Sqn		Died 2010?; Retired at the rank of Air Cdre
Evans, Walter Reginald	Sgt	BR	85 & 249 Sqns		
Everitt, Alfred Douglas	Sgt	BR	235 Sqn		Died 1953
Everitt, Geoffrey Charles	Sgt	BR	29 Sqn	MM, KZ	KIA 6 August 1942
Eyles, Peter Raoul	Sgt	BR	92 Sqn		MIA 20 September 1940
Eyre, Anthony "Tony"	Fg Off	BR	615 Sqn	DFC	Official Ace, Captured 8 March 1942, imprisoned Stalag Luft III 1942–1945. KIFA 16 February 1946 while serving as Commanding Officer (rank of Wg Cdr) of RAF Fairwood Common. Buried with full military honours at St Cenydd's Church, Llangennith in South West Wales

== F ==
Name	Rank	Nationality	Sqn during Battle	Awards	Notes
Fajtl, František	Flt Lt	CZ	17 & 1 Sqns		Died 4 October 2006
Falkowski, Jan Pawel	Fg Off	POL	32 Sqn	VM, KW***, DFC	
Farley, Walter Ronald	Flt Lt	BR	156 & 46 Sqns	DFC	KIA 21 April 1942 (as Wg Cdr, CO of 138 Sqn)
Farmer, James Nigel Watts	Flt Lt	BR	302 Sqn		
Farnes, Eric	Plt Off	BR	141 Sqn		Died 23 September 1985
Farnes, Paul Caswell Powe	Sgt	BR	501 Sqn	DFM	Official Ace. Died 28 January 2020. Last surviving ace of the battle.
Farquhar, Andrew Douglas	Wg Cdr	BR	257 Sqn	DFC	Died mid-1960s
Farrow, John Robinson	Sgt	BR	229 Sqn		KIA 8 October 1940 (Pilot)
Fathing, John	Sgt	BR	235 Sqn		
Fawcett, Derek P	Sgt	BR	29 Sqn		KIA 15 September 1941
Fayolle, Emile Francois Marie Leonce	Plt Off (Adj)	Free FR	85 Sqn	DFC, CdeL	KIA 14 August 1942
Fearns, Francis	Sgt	BR	601 Sqn		Service details unknown
Feary, Alan Norman	Sgt	BR	609 Sqn		Official Ace, KIA 7 October 1940 (Pilot)
Feather, John Leslie	Sgt	BR	235 Sqn		KIA 18 September 1940
Fechtner, Emil	Plt Off	CZ	310 Sqn	DFC	KIA 29 October 1940
Fejfar, Stanislav	Plt Off	CZ	310 Sqn		KIA 17 May 1942
Fenemore, Stanley Allen	Sgt	BR	245 & 501 Sqn		KIA 15 October 1940
Fenn, Cecil Francis	Sgt	BR	248 Sqn		Died 27 December 1987
Fenton, Harold Arthur	Sqn Ldr	BR	238 Sqn (CO)	CBE, DSO, DFC	Retired 1957
Fenton, John Ollis	Plt Off	BR	235 Sqn		KIA 28 May 1941
Fenton, Walter Gordon	Sgt	NZ	604 Sqn		
Fenwick, Charles Raymond	Plt Off	BR	610 Sqn		
Fenwick, Samuel Green	Plt Off	BR	601 Sqn		Buried with RAF honours in Devon 2007
Ferdinand, Roy Fredrick	Plt Off	BR	263 Sqn		KIA 12 June 1941
Ferguson, Eric Hannah	Sgt	BR	141 Sqn		KIA 11 April 1943
Ferguson, Peter John	Sqn Ldr	BR	602 Sqn		
Feric, Miroslaw	Plt Off	POL	303 Sqn	VM, KW*, DFC	KIFA Feb 1942
Ferriss, Henry Michael	Flt Lt	BR	111 Sqn	DFC	Official Ace, KIA 16 August 1940
Fildes, Frank	AC	BR	25 Sqn		
Finch	Sgt	BR	615 Sqn		Service details unknown
Finch, T R H	Fg Off	BR	151 Sqn		Service details unknown
Finlay, Donald Osborne "Don"	Sqn Ldr	BR	41 & 54 Sqns	DFC, AFC, MiD	Official Ace; Died 19 April 1970
Finnie, Archibald	Plt Off	BR	54 Sqn		KIA 25 July 1940
Finnis, John Frederick Fortescue	Flt Lt	SR	1 & 229 Sqns		
Finucane, Brendan Eamonn Fergus "Paddy"	Wg Cdr	IRE	65 Sqn	DSO, DFC**	KIA 15 July 1942
Fisher, Anthony George Anson	Fg Off	BR	111 Sqn		Died July 1988
Fisher, Basil Mark	Fg Off	BR	111 Sqn		KIA 15 August 1940
Fisher, Gerald	Fg Off	BR	602 Sqn		Died 1973
Fiske, William Meade Lindsley "Billy"	Plt Off	AME	601 Sqn		KIA 17 August 1940
Fitzgerald, Thomas Bernard	Fg Off	NZ	141 Sqn	DFC	Born Timaru, New Zealand, 11 July 1917; Short Service Commission in RAF, Jun 1938; made war's first single-engined operational flight when he dropped leaflets over Frankfurt and tested night defences, 19 September 1939; Personal Assistant to Gen Hoyt D. Vandenberg, USAAF, Feb 1945; relinquished commission as Flt Lt (Temp. Sqn Ldr) on appointment to RNZAF, Feb 1946; retired Dec 1947. Died Christchurch, New Zealand, 12 August 2006
Fizel, Joseph Francis	AC1	BR	29 Sqn		Died 29 August 1976; Also spelt "Fizell"
Fleming, John	Fg Off	NZ	605 Sqn	MBE	
Fleming, Robert David Spittall	Plt Off	BR	249 Sqn		KIA 7 September 1940
Fletcher, Andrew William	Sqn Ldr	CAN	235 Sqn	DFC	
Fletcher, John Denys	Sgt	BR	3 Sqn		KIA 8 February 1942
Fletcher, John Gordon Bewley	Sgt	BR	604 Sqn		KIA 25 August 1940 Blenheim L6782' crashed near Witheridge, Exeter, cause unknown.
Fletcher, Walter Thomas	Sgt	NZ	23 Sqn		
Flinders, John L "Polly"	Plt Off	BR	32 Sqn		Died 1988
Flood, Fredrick William	Flt Lt	AUS	235 Sqn		MIA 11 September 1940
Flower, Hubert Luiz	Sgt	BR	248 Sqn		Surviving aircrew
Foglar, Václav	Sgt	CZ	245 Sqn		KIFA Dec 1947
Foit, Emil Antonín	Plt Off	CZ	85 Sqn	DFC	Died 1976
Fokes, Ronald Henry	Sgt	BR	92 Sqn	DFM	KIA 12 June 1944
Folliard, James Henry	AC	BR	604 Sqn		Died 1981
Fopp, Desmond	Sgt	AUS	17 Sqn	AFC	
Forbes, Athol Stanhope	Flt Lt	BR	303 & 66 Sqns		Official Ace; Died 1981
Ford, Ernest George	Sgt	CAN	3 & 232 Sqn		KIA 12 December 1942 (Canada)
Ford, Roy Clement "Henry"	Sgt	BR	41 Sqn		Born Hastings, Sussex, 1915; Commissioned Nov 1940; released from RAF, Oct 1945; commissioned in RAFVR, Sep 1947; retired May 1952; Died December 2002
Forde, Derek Nigel	Fg Off	BR	145 & 605 Sqns	DFC	Died 16 January 1979
Forrest, Dudley Henry	Sgt	BR	66 Sqn & 421 Flt		
Forrester, George Mathwin	Plt Off	BR	605 Sqn		KIA 9 September 1940 (collided with He 111)
Forshaw, Terence Henry Trimble	Flt Lt	BR	19, 616 & 609 Sqns		
Forster, Anthony Douglas	Fg Off	BR	151 & 607 Sqns	DFC	
Forsyth, Colin Leo Malcolm	Sgt	NZ	23 Sqn	DFC, DFM	KIA 8 May 1944
Forward, Ronald Victor	Sgt	BR	257 Sqn		
Foster, Robert William	Plt Off	BR	605 Sqn	DFC	Surviving aircrew
Fotheringham, Allan Cook	Sgt	BR	3 Sqn		Captured and made POW 15 February 1941 Died 1984
Fott, E A	Plt Off	CZ	310 Sqn		Service details unknown
Fowler, Alfred Lawrence	Plt Off	NZ	248 Sqn	DFC	KIFA 23 August 1941
Fowler, Reginald John	Sgt	BR	247 Sqn		
Fox, Lawrence	AC1	BR	29 Sqn		
Fox, Peter Hutton	Sgt	BR	56 Sqn		Captured and made POW 28 June 1941; Died
Foxley-Norris, Christopher Neil	Fg Off	BR	3 Sqn	DSO, OBE, GCB	Retired 1974 with the rank of AVM. Died 28 September 2003
Fox-Male, Dennis Humbert	Plt Off	BR	152 Sqn		Died 1 April 1986
Francis, A	Sgt	BR	3 Sqn		Service details unknown
Francis, Colin Dunstone	Plt Off	BR	253 Sqn		KIA 30 August 1940
Francis, Clarence William "Bill"	Sgt	BR	74 & 3 Sqns		
Francis, Douglas Norman	Sgt	BR	257 Sqn		Died 7 January 1961
Francis, John	Sgt	BR	23 Sqn		
Francis, Noel Inglis Chalmers	Sgt	BR	247 Sqn		KIA 9 December 1941
Franklin, Walter Derrick Kerr	Fg Off	JAM	74 Sqn		Died 25 October 2001
Franklin, William Henry	Plt Off	BR	65 Sqn	DFM*	Official Ace, MIA 12 December 1940
František, Josef	Sgt	CZ	303 Sqn	CdeG, DFM*, VM	KIFA 8 October 1940
Fraser, Robert Henry Braund	Sgt	BR	257 Sqn		KIA 22 October 1940
Freeborn, John Connell	Fg Off	BR	74 Sqn	DFC*	Official Ace, (1 December 1919 – 28 August 2010)
Freeman, Richard Powell	Sgt	BR	29 Sqn		
Freer, Peter Foster	PO	BR	29 Sqn		KIA 11 May 1941
Freese, Laurence Eric	Sgt	BR	611 & 74 Sqn		KIA 10 January 1941
French, Thomas Lennox	Sgt	BR	29 Sqn		KIA 14 December 1942
Frey, Juliusz A K W	Flt Lt	POL	607 Sqn	KW	
Friend, Jack Richard	Sgt	BR	25 Sqn		KIA 7 December 1940
Friendship, Alfred Henry Basil	Plt Off	BR	3 Sqn	DFM	
Fripp, Joffre Harry	Sgt	BR	248 Sqn		Died 1973
Frisby, Edward Murray	Fg Off	BR	504 Sqn		KIA 5 December 1941
Frith, Eric Thomas G	Sgt	BR	611 & 92 Sqns		WIA 9 October 1940, Died 17 October 1940
Frizell, Charles George	Plt Off	CAN	257 Sqn		
Frost, Jack Lynch	Plt Off	BR	600 Sqn		
Fulford, David	Sgt	BR	64 & 19 Sqns	DFC	KIA 2 November 1942
Fumerton, Robert Carl "Moose"	Plt Off	CAN	32 Sqn	DFC*, AFC	
Furneaux, Rex Horton	Sgt	BR	3 & 73 Sqns		
Fürst, Bohumír	Sgt	CZ	310 & 605 Sqns		Died 2 January 1978

== Notes on table ==
- Ranks given are those held during the Battle of Britain, although a higher rank may have been achieved after the Battle.
- All individuals listed in bold and highlighted in silver are believed to be still alive.
- Aircrew listed as KIA, MIA, WIA or KIFA during the Battle of Britain are highlighted in blue.
- The awards listed include those made during the Battle of Britain and during the remainder of World War II, as well as any made post-war.
- In order to limit the numbers of footnotes which would otherwise be required, the symbol ‡ under "Notes" indicates several entries in the text of Ramsay 1989, while the symbol † indicates that information on the circumstances under which an airman became a casualty during the Battle is included in the text of the book. Where more than one crew member of a multi place aircraft was involved this is included as a cross-reference under "Notes"
- In addition to 2,353 British aircrew, the RAF Roll of Honour recognises 574 personnel from other countries; namely:

Australia, Barbados, Belgium, Canada, Czechoslovakia, France, Ireland, Jamaica, Newfoundland, New Zealand, Poland, Rhodesia, South Africa and the United States.

=== Abbreviations ===
- (CO) after "Sqn" denotes Commanding Officer of that squadron, as per the RAF Fighter Command Order of Battle on 15 September 1940, unless otherwise indicated.
- (FAA) after a rank denotes a member of the Fleet Air Arm rather than the RAF.
- "KIA" – "killed in action"
- "KIFA" – "killed in flying accident", i.e. not during combat
- "MIA" – "missing in action".
- "WIA" – "wounded in action" leading to death which, in some cases, may have occurred months later.
- "POW" – "prisoner of war".
- For details of RAF rank abbreviations, see RAF Commissioned Officer Ranks and RAF Non-Commissioned Officer Ranks.
- For details of FAA rank abbreviations, see FAA Commissioned Officer Ranks.

=== Nationalities ===
AME	American
AUS	Australian
BEL	Belgian
BR	British
CAN	Canadian
CZ	Czechoslovak
FR	French
IRE	Irish
NZ	New Zealander
POL	Poland
RHO	Rhodesian
SA	South African

=== Awards ===
Award	Title	Notes
AE	Air Efficiency Award	Awarded for ten years' efficient service in the Royal Auxiliary Air Force
AFC	Air Force Cross	Awarded for "an act or acts of valour, courage or devotion to duty whilst flying, though not in active operations against the enemy".
CB	Companion of The Order of the Bath	Awarded at the monarch's pleasure
CDeG	Croix de Guerre	A military decoration of both France and Belgium, also commonly bestowed to foreign military forces allied to France and Belgium.
CdeL	Croix de la Libération	A decoration of France awarded for very meritorious conduct with the Free French Forces during World War II.
CdeLd'H	Croix de Légion d'honneur	A decoration of France awarded for excellent civil or military conduct delivered, upon official investigation.
CdeLL	Croix de L'Ordre de Leopold	Awarded to Belgian nationals or some distinguished foreign persons who made very important contributions to the Belgian state or society.
DFC	Distinguished Flying Cross	Awarded to Royal Air Force commissioned officers and Warrant Officers for "an act or acts of valour, courage or devotion to duty whilst flying in active operations against the enemy".
DFC*	Distinguished Flying Cross and Bar	A bar is added to the ribbon for holders of the DFC who received a second award.
DFC**	Distinguished Flying Cross and Bar	A second bar is added to the ribbon for holders of the DFC and Bar who received a third award.
DFM	Distinguished Flying Medal	Awarded to military below commissioned rank, for "an act or acts of valour, courage or devotion to duty whilst flying in active operations against the enemy".
DSO	Distinguished Service Order	Awarded for meritorious or distinguished service by officers of the armed forces during wartime, typically in actual combat.
DSO*	Distinguished Service Order and Bar	A bar is added to the ribbon for holders of the DSO who received a second award.
DSO**	Distinguished Service Order and Two Bars	A second bar is added to the ribbon for holders of the DSO and Bar who received a third award.
GCB	Knight Grand Cross of The Order of the Bath	Awarded at the monarch's pleasure
KCVO	Knight Commander of the Royal Victorian Order	Awarded for personal service to the sovereign
KStJ	Knight of the Order of Saint John	
KW	Krzyz Walecznych, Polish "Cross of Valour"	Awarded to an individual who "has demonstrated deeds of valour and courage on the field of battle."
KZ	Krzyz Zaslugi, Polish "Cross of Merit"	Awarded for exemplary public service or humanitarian work that goes above and beyond the call of duty.
MBE	Member of the Order of the British Empire	Awarded at the monarch's pleasure
MC	Military Cross	Awarded for "an act or acts of exemplary gallantry during active operations against the enemy on land to all members, of any rank".
MM	Military Medal	Awarded for acts of gallantry and devotion to duty under fire
OBE	Officer of the Order of the British Empire	Awarded at the monarch's pleasure
OStJ	Officer of the Order of Saint John	
VC	Victoria Cross	Highest British military decoration, awarded for valour in the face of the enemy.
VM	Virtuti Militari	Highest Polish military award for courage in the face of the enemy.

== See also ==
- Non-British personnel in the RAF during the Battle of Britain
- List of World War II aces from the United Kingdom
- List of World War II flying aces by country
- List of World War II flying aces
- List of RAF aircrew in the Battle of Britain (A–C)
- List of RAF aircrew in the Battle of Britain (G–K)
- List of RAF aircrew in the Battle of Britain (L–N)
- List of RAF aircrew in the Battle of Britain (O–R)
- List of RAF aircrew in the Battle of Britain (S–U)
- List of RAF aircrew in the Battle of Britain (V–Z)

== Bibliography ==
- Ramsay, Winston, ed. The Battle of Britain Then and Now Mk V. London: Battle of Britain Prints International Ltd, 1989. ISBN 0-900913-46-0.
- Ringlstetter, Herbert (2005). Helmut Wick, An Illustrated Biography of the Luftwaffe Ace And Commander of Jagdgeschwader 2 During The Battle of Britain. Atglen, PA: Schiffer Publishing. ISBN 0-7643-2217-6.
- Remembering the Battle of Britain
- Robert Dixon, '607 Squadron: A Shade of Blue'. The History Press 2008. ISBN 978-0-7524-4531-1
- Robert Dixon, 'A Gathering of Eagles' PublishBritannica 2004, ISBN 1-4137-3498-7
