= Albert Gregory (disambiguation) =

Albert Gregory may refer to:

- Albert Gregory (1917-2010), Royal Air Force Air Gunner
- Albert Gregory (footballer) (1913-?), English footballer, see List of Bury F.C. players (1–24 appearances)

== See also ==
- Albert Gregory Meyer (1903-1965), American Catholic prelate
