= Robert Innes =

Robert Innes may refer to:

- Robert Innes (bishop) (born 1959), Anglican bishop and Bishop of the Diocese in Europe
- Robert Innes (economist), American economist
- Robert Alexander Innes (1918–2005), Royal Air Force officer
- Robert T. A. Innes (1861–1933), Scottish-South African astronomer
- Bob Innes (New Zealand footballer), former association football player who represented New Zealand
- Bob Innes (Scottish footballer) (1878–1959), Scottish association football player
- Sir Robert Innes, 1st Baronet (died c. 1655), see Innes baronets
- Sir Robert Innes, 2nd Baronet (c. 1690), see Innes baronets
- Sir Robert Innes, 1st Baronet (died c. 1650), see Innes baronets
- Sir Robert Innes, 3rd Baronet (died c. 1680), see Innes baronets
- Sir Robert Innes, 6th Baronet (c. 1703–1758), see Innes baronets
