= Henry Ferriss =

British flying ace of WWII

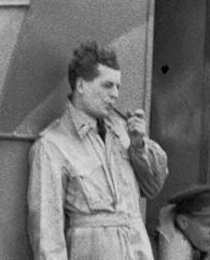
- Ferriss, 1940
- Born: 1 August 1917; Lee, London, England
- Died: 16 August 1940 (aged 23) near Marden, England
- Burial place: St Mary's churchyard, Chislehurst, England
- Military career
- Allegiance: United Kingdom
- Branch: Royal Air Force
- Service years: 1937–1940 †
- Rank: Flight Lieutenant
- Unit: No. 111 Squadron
- Conflicts: Second World War: Battle of France; Battle of Britain
- Awards: Distinguished Flying Cross

Henry Ferriss DFC (1 August 1917 – 16 August 1940) was a British flying ace who served in the Royal Air Force (RAF) during the Second World War. He is credited with having shot down at least eleven aircraft.

Born in Lee, Ferriss joined the RAF in 1937 and was posted to No. 111 Squadron the following year after completing his training. Still with the squadron at the time of the outbreak of the Second World War, he flew extensively in the Battle of France and the subsequent Battle of Britain. Flying a Hawker Hurricane fighter, he claimed a number of aerial victories during this time. He was killed on 16 August 1940 in a mid-air collision with a German bomber that he was attempting to shoot down.

== Early life ==
Henry Michael Ferriss was born on 1 August 1917 at Lee, a south-eastern suburb of London, in England. He was educated at St Joseph's Academy in Blackheath, subsequently going on to attend Stonyhurst College. By 1935 he was studying at the University of London and then commenced medical training at St Thomas's Hospital Medical School. As a student, he flew with the University Air Squadron.

A lack of finance meant that he gave up his studies and in July 1937 Ferriss joined the Royal Air Force on a short-service commission. Appointed as an acting pilot officer on probation in September 1937, he trained at No. 6 Flying Training School at Netheravon. Once his training was completed, Ferriss was posted to No. 111 Squadron in May 1938. His new unit was stationed at Northolt and was equipped with the Hawker Hurricane fighter, the first RAF squadron to receive the type. He was confirmed in his pilot officer rank a few months later.

== Second World War ==
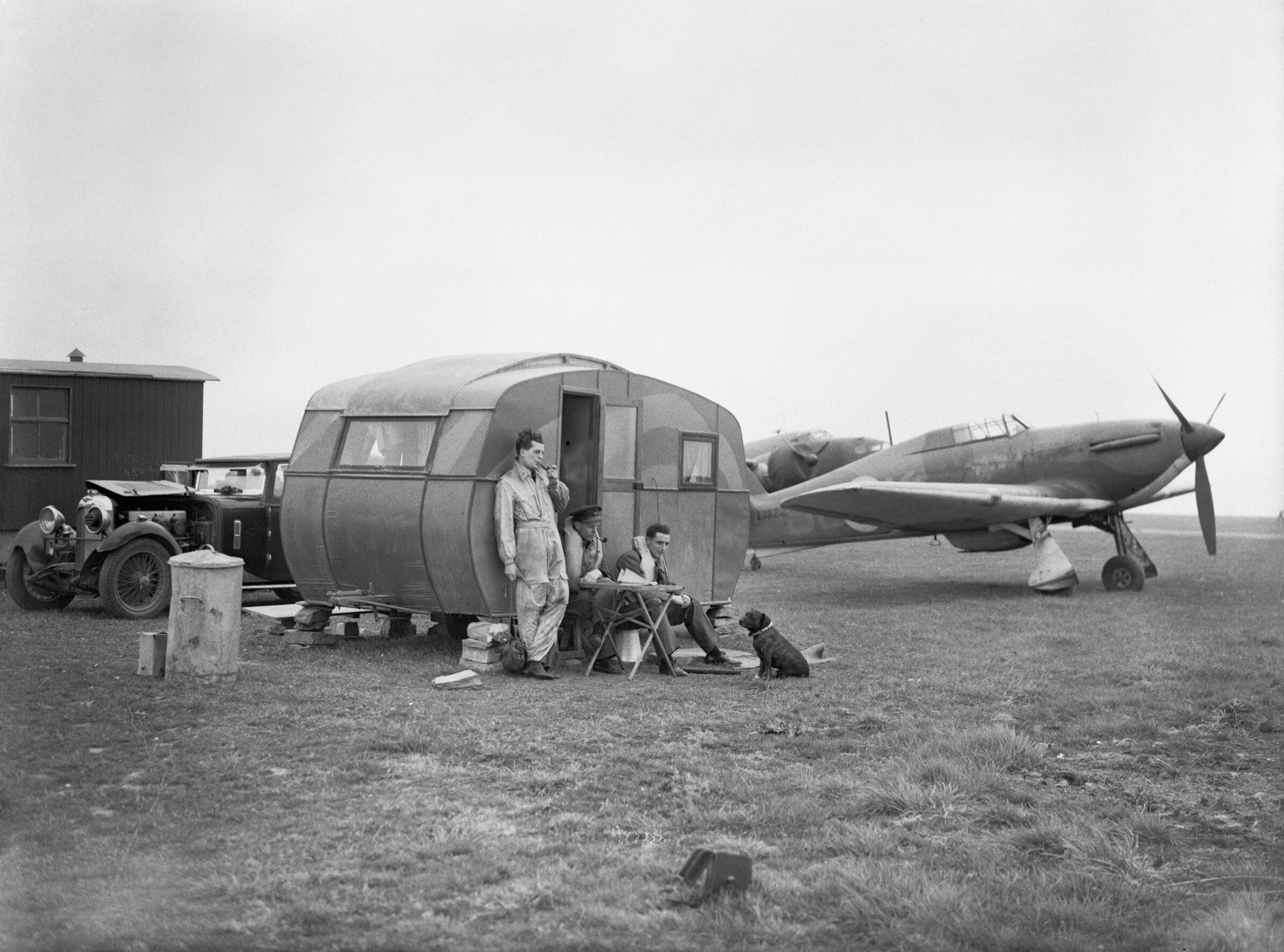
A group of No. 111 Squadron pilots at Wick in 1940; Ferriss is standing, leaning against the caravan

Shortly after the outbreak of the Second World War, No. 111 Squadron moved north, initially to Acklington and then to Drem in Scotland, from where it patrolled along the coastline. On 12 January 1940, Ferriss was promoted to flying officer. The next month No. 111 Squadron shifted again, this time to Wick, where it provided the Royal Navy base at Scapa Flow with aerial cover. It was occasionally scrambled to counter Luftwaffe bomber attacks. On 8 April, Ferriss claimed a half share in a Heinkel He 111 medium bomber destroyed near Scapa Flow, although this was not confirmed. Two days later, flying in the same vicinity, he shared in the destruction of another He 111, of Kampfgeschwader 26 (Bomber Wing 26).

=== Battle of France ===
By mid-May, No. 111 Squadron was back in the south of England, from where it regularly flew to France following the invasion of that country. On 18 May Ferriss destroyed three Messerschmitt Bf 110 heavy fighters to the east of Douai, and also claimed another Bf 110 as damaged. At least some of the aircrew of the aircraft he destroyed had taken to their parachutes and Ferriss reported that he had fired upon them, believing that they would make territory held by the Germans. From late May and into early June, No. 111 Squadron flew in support of Operation Dynamo, the evacuation of the British Expeditionary Force from Dunkirk. During this time, on 31 May, Ferriss shot down a Messerschmitt Bf 109 fighter north of Dunkirk.

Once the evacuation was completed, the squadron provided escorts for the Fleet Air Arm's bombing operations over the French coast and on 6 June, Ferriss destroyed two Bf 109s near Abbeville.

=== Battle of Britain ===
A period of rest at Croydon followed for No. 111 Squadron; this allowed for training up of replacement pilots. During this time Ferris was recognised for his successes in the previous weeks with an award of a Distinguished Flying Cross. This was gazetted on 20 June and the published citation read:

During two consecutive days in May, Flying Officer Ferriss shot down a total of four Messerschmitt 110's although heavily outnumbered. Later, he shot down a further three Messerschmitt 109's. In these combats he has displayed outstanding ability.

— London Gazette, No. 34878, 21 June 1940

The squadron soon commenced patrolling over the English Channel. On 10 July, Ferris shared in the destruction of a Dornier Do 17 medium bomber off Folkestone, and also shot down a Bf 109 in the same vicinity. The fighter crashed into the sea but the pilot was subsequently rescued. Ferriss meanwhile was attacked by another Bf 109 and as a result, his Hurricane was damaged and he was lightly wounded. Patrolling 10 miles (16 km) to the west of Boulogne on 28 July, Ferriss caught a Heinkel He 59 floatplane of the Luftwaffe's Seenotdienst (sea rescue service) on the surface of the sea; it was attempting to rescue the crew of another He 59 that had been shot down by pilots of No. 111 Squadron. Making strafing attacks on the He 59, Ferriss caused major damage and wounded two of the crew.

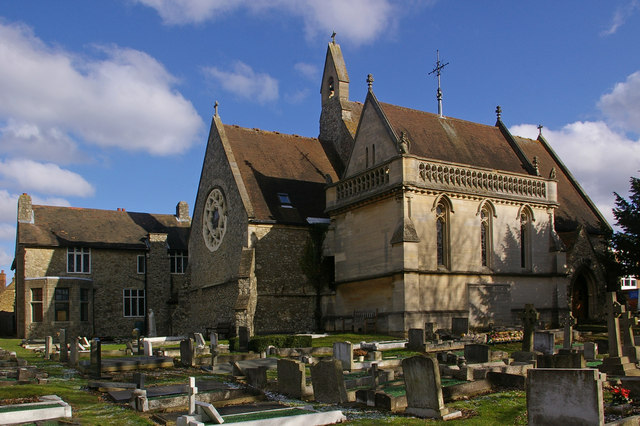
Ferriss is buried in the churchyard at St Mary's Church in Chislehurst

On 13 August Ferriss destroyed one Do 17 and damaged a second over Seasalter. Two days he claimed a Do 17 as probably destroyed near Dover. The next day, No. 111 Squadron was scrambled to intercept bombers approaching the Kent coastline. Making a head-on attack on one of these bombers, a Do 17, near Marden, Ferriss collided with the aircraft he targeted. The wreckage of his Hurricane landed on a nearby farm. He and the crew of the bomber were killed.

Ferriss is buried at St Mary's churchyard in Chislehurst, England. He is credited with having shot down eleven German aircraft, two of which were shared with other pilots. Another shared aerial victory was unconfirmed. He is also credited with one aircraft probably destroyed and two damaged.
