= Harold Howes =

British fighter pilot of WWII

- Born: 24 December 1915; Gillingham, United Kingdom
- Died: 22 December 1940 (aged 24); Cuxton, United Kingdom
- Burial place: St Margaret's Church, Rainham, United Kingdom
- Military career
- Allegiance: United Kingdom
- Branch: Royal Air Force
- Rank: Sergeant
- Units: No. 85 Squadron; No. 605 Squadron
- Conflicts: Second World War: Battle of France; Battle of Britain
- Awards: Distinguished Flying Medal

Harold Howes DFM (24 December 1915 – 22 December 1940) was a British flying ace who served with the Royal Air Force (RAF) during the Second World War. He is credited with having shot down at least twelve aircraft.

From Gillingham, Howes, a member of the Royal Air Force Volunteer Reserve, was called up for service in the RAF on the outbreak of the Second World War. Originally posted to No. 213 Squadron, in May 1940 he was sent to France as a reinforcement pilot for No. 85 Squadron. He flew Hawker Hurricane fighters in the Battle of France and in the subsequent aerial campaign over southeast England, achieving several aerial victories. His successes were recognised with the award of the Distinguished Flying Medal in October. He was killed in a flying accident on 22 December 1940, two days before his 25th birthday.

== Early life ==
Harold Norman Howes was born on 24 December 1915 in Gillingham, Kent, in the United Kingdom. In December 1937, he joined the Royal Air Force Volunteer Reserve and commenced training as a pilot.

== Second World War ==
Called up for service in the Royal Air Force on the outbreak of the Second World War, Howes was sent to No. 213 Squadron as a sergeant pilot upon completion of his training. This unit was stationed at Wittering and equipped with Hawker Hurricane fighters; it was mostly engaged in patrols along the east coast. In mid-May 1940, he was sent to France as a reinforcement pilot for No. 85 Squadron, which was heavily engaged in the aerial campaign there following the 10 May invasion of the country. On 20 August, he destroyed four Dornier Do 17 medium bombers, and damaged a fifth, to the northwest of Abbeville. Howes was subsequently shot down by Messerschmitt Bf 110 heavy fighters, putting his stricken Hurricane down near Abbeville. Unhurt, he eventually made his way back to his unit although he had been reported missing in the interim. After nearly two weeks of constant action in France, No. 85 Squadron had become non-operational and was withdrawn to Debden. While it was refitting, Howes was selected for a posting to the Middle East but after a short period at the pilot depot at Uxbridge this was cancelled and he returned to the squadron.

=== Battle of Britain ===
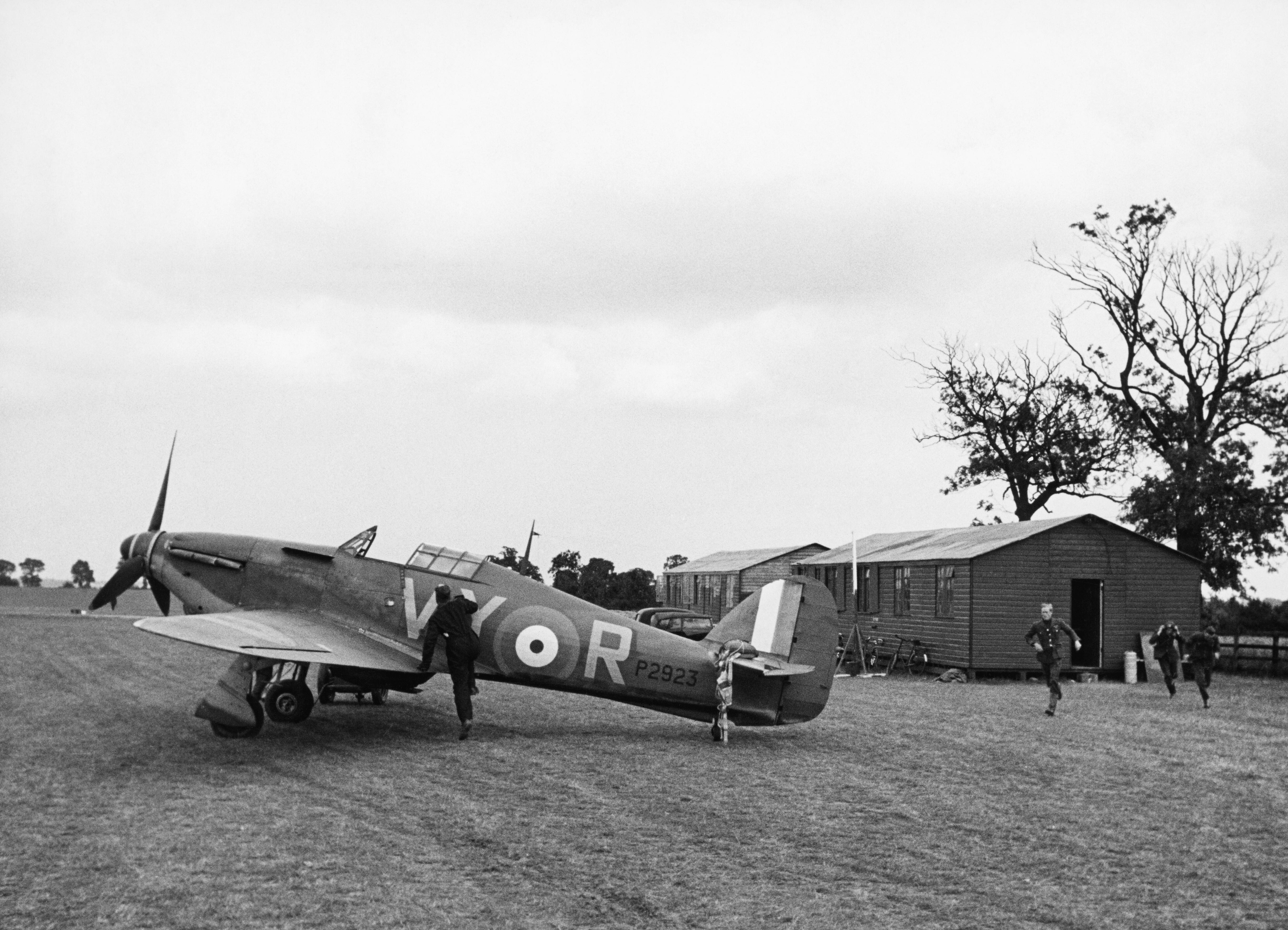
A Hawker Hurricane of No. 85 Squadron, July 1940

As the Luftwaffe's bombing campaign on the southeast England escalated, No. 85 Squadron was increasingly drawn into the aerial fighting. In the late afternoon of 18 August, the squadron was scrambled to intercept over 50 Heinkel He 111 medium bombers and their escorting Bf 110s, targeting the airfield at North Weald; the Hurricanes were unable to get through to the bombers but Howes shot down two Bf 110s to the east of River Crouch. He also damaged a Do 17 in the same area. His next success came on 26 August, when he shared in the destruction of a Do 17 over Maidstone. On the last day of August, he probably destroyed a Do 17 in the vicinity of Biggin Hill. The next day he destroyed a Do 17 to the south of Tunbridge Wells. He also damaged a Messerschmitt Bf 109 fighter. On 12 September, Howes was posted to No. 605 Squadron. This was based at Croydon and, like No. 85 Squadron, operated the Hurricane.

On 15 September, now known as Battle of Britain Day, the Luftwaffe mounted a large bombing raid on southeast England in which No. 605 Squadron was heavily engaged. When the squadron was scrambled in the mid-afternoon, Howes shot down one Do 17 to the east of Dungeness and probably destroyed a second over the Thames Estuary. By early October, the Luftwaffe's daylight raids were on the wane but Howes shot down a Bf 109 near Dungeness Point on 12 October. His successes in France and in the early part of the Battle of Britain were recognised with an award of the Distinguished Flying Medal. The citation, published in the London Gazette, read:

During the period of intensive operations in France, Sergeant Howes destroyed four enemy aircraft. In August, 1940, he took part in attacks against large enemy formations. He personally destroyed two Messerschmitt 110's and one Dornier 215, and severely damaged several others. Sergeant Howes has proved himself a brave and determined pilot.

— London Gazette, No. 34978, 25 October 1940

Howes damaged a Bf 109 in an engagement near Eastchurch on 1 November. The next day, he damaged another Bf 109, this time in the vicinity of Beachy Head. On 10 November, he destroyed a Bf 109 over the Thames Estuary. The Luftwaffe mounted a large raid with Bf 109 fighter-bombers on 15 November, and No. 605 Squadron was involved in its interception; Howes shot down one of the three Bf 109s that were destroyed by the squadron. On 1 December, Howes was in an engagement with Bf 109s which resulted in his Hurricane being damaged. He made a forced landing at the airfield at Gravesend. This was one of three of the squadron's aircraft that were lost as a result of contact with the Luftwaffe.

On a night time patrol on 22 December, Howes was killed in an aircraft accident. The weather had curtailed his patrol and he was returning to Croydon when it is believed that he lost control of his Hurricane, which crashed at Cuxton in Kent. He is buried in the cemetery of St Margaret's Church at Rainham in Kent. At the time of his death, Howes was credited with the destruction of twelve aircraft, one of which shared with other pilots, and five damaged. He is also believed to have probably destroyed two aircraft.
