= Albert Gregory =

Albert Edward Gregory
- Born: Albert Edward Gregory
- Died: 12 November 2010
- Military career
- Allegiance: United Kingdom
- Branch: Royal Air Force
- Rank: Flight Lieutenant
- Units: No. 141 Squadron RAF; No. 219 Squadron RAF; No. 275 Squadron RAF; No. 278 Squadron RAF
- Conflicts: World War II: Battle of Britain; Malaya
- Awards: Distinguished Flying Cross; Air Efficiency Award

Flight Lieutenant Albert Edward Gregory, DFC, AE (1917–2010) was a World War II Royal Air Force Air Gunner during the Battle of Britain, and was one of the men known as "The Few".

Albert Gregory was born in 1917. Before joining the RAF he worked in a butcher's shop and later as a Co-op delivery man.

As an Air Gunner he was posted to No. 141 Squadron RAF to fly in Blenheims before the squadron converted to Defiants. He could not fly in the Defiant because he was too tall for the turret, so transferred to No. 219 Squadron RAF with whom he served throughout the Battle of Britain on Beaufighters. Albert then served with 23 Sqn in Boston IIIs on intruder patrols over occupied France, Belgium and Holland on bombing and strafing missions, before spending time with No. 275 Squadron RAF and No. 278 Squadron RAF both Air-Sea Rescue Squadrons.

He was awarded the Distinguished Flying Cross in 1942 in recognition of his night flying service. The citation read "This officer has a long and meritorious record as an air gunner, having been engaged in night flying for nearly 3 years. Throughout his operational tour Flying Officer Gregory has shown great courage, skill and devotion to duty".

Gregory was one of the remaining members of "The Few" and was present at many Battle of Britain events, including the unveiling of the Battle of Britain Monument in London. He was, however, always puzzled why people were so interested in him; after all as he always said

I was just doing my job.

Gregory died on 12 November 2010 after a short illness.
