= Robert Alexander Innes =

- Born: 15 June 1918
- Died: 6 April 2005 (aged 86)
- Allegiance: United Kingdom
- Branch: Royal Air Force
- Service years: 1938–1961
- Rank: Squadron leader

Robert Alexander Innes (15 June 1918 – 6 April 2005) was a Royal Air Force officer, one of "The Few" who fought in the Battle of Britain.

== Military career ==
Innes joined the Royal Air Force Volunteer Reserve in August 1938 as an Airman under training Pilot. He was called up to duty on 1 September 1939. On completion of his flying training in March 1940, he was initially posted to fly the Bristol Blenheim light bomber, but was reassigned to No. 253 Squadron RAF at RAF Kenley on 6 May 1940, piloting the Hawker Hurricane fighter. He fought in the Battle of France and the Battle of Britain, claiming in the latter a Messerschmitt Bf 110 on 30 August and a Dornier Do 17 of 8/KG 2 on 15 September. He probably downed a Messerschmitt Bf 109 on 11 November.

Innes was commissioned in March 1941. In April 1941 he sailed, first on HMS Argus, then HMS Ark Royal, from which he and other Hurricane pilots flew to Malta. He briefly joined No. 261 Squadron, then transferred to No. 185 Squadron at RAF Hal Far.

He was injured during aerial combat, which ended his combat career, and returned home on HMS Edinburgh. After recovering from his wounds, he trained and spent the rest of the war as a flying instructor. After the war, he returned to Malta in 1952 to reform and command No. 185 Squadron. Innes retired on 31 August 1961 as a squadron leader.
