= No. 245 Squadron RAF =

No. 245 (Northern Rhodesian) Squadron RAF
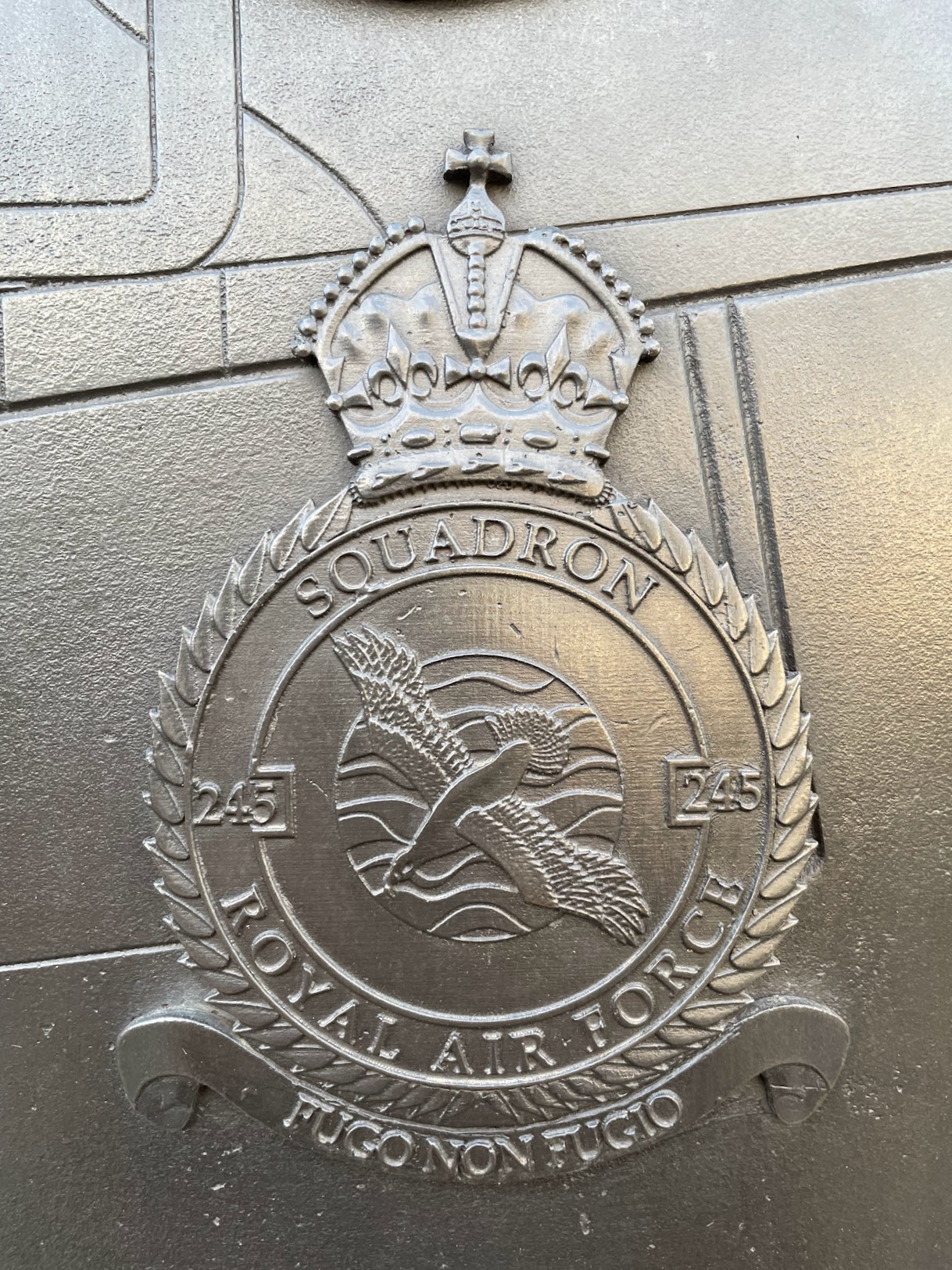
- The squadron's heraldic badge as it appears on the Battle of Britain Monument in London
- Active: 20 August 1918 – 19 May 1919; 30 October 1939 – 10 August 1945; 10 August 1945 – 3 June 1957; 21 August 1958 – 18 April 1963
- Country: United Kingdom
- Branch: Royal Air Force
- Nickname: Northern Rhodesian
- Mottos: Latin: Fugo Non Fugio ("I put to fight, I do not flee")

Insignia
- Squadron Badge heraldry: In front of a fountain, an eagle volant The eagle symbolises readiness to attack and the fountain the sea over which No. 245 Squadron flew many patrols
- post 1950 aircraft insignia
- Squadron Codes: DX (Mar 1940 – Jun 1941); MR (Jun 1941 – 1951)

No. 245 Squadron was a squadron of the Royal Air Force. It flew as an anti-submarine squadron during World War I and as a fighter squadron during World War II. After the war it was first a jet-fighter squadron and its last role was as a radar-calibration unit.

== History ==
=== World War I ===
No. 245 Squadron was formed on 20 August 1918 from No. 426 and No. 427 Flight at Fishguard. It flew Short 184 on anti-submarine patrols over the southern Irish Sea. The squadron disbanded on 19 May 1919.

=== World War II ===
As No. 245 (Northern Rhodesian) Squadron, the squadron was reformed at RAF Leconfield on 30 October 1939 equipped with Bristol Blenheim light bombers, and from January 1940, Fairey Battle light bombers. Both of these types were replaced by Hurricanes in March 1940 and in May it moved to RAF Drem in Scotland. However, during the Dunkirk evacuation it operated a detachment from RAF Hawkinge, but in July it was transferred to RAF Aldergrove in Northern Ireland, where it remained throughout the Battle of Britain on defensive duties. In July 1941 it moved to RAF Ballyhalbert and remained there until September 1941, when it returned to England and began offensive sweeps. On 19 August 1942, the squadron took part in a preparatory attack as part of the Dieppe Raid. Ten aircraft took off at 0445 from RAF Shoreham. Three aircraft failed to return, and of the remaining seven, only one was serviceable. In January 1943 it moved to Scotland again, where it began converting to Typhoons, taking these back down south in March to RAF Westhampnett. The squadron was then allocated to the 2nd Tactical Air Force on its formation in June 1943 and soon began attacking enemy lines of communication and other suitable targets in preparation for Operation Overlord. From April it began using rocket projectiles and on 27 June 1944, it moved onto the continent, from where it continued to support the Allied advance through France, the Low Countries and into Germany. The squadron disbanded at Schleswig in Germany on 10 August 1945.

=== Postwar ===
That same 10 August 1945 at RAF Colerne, No. 504 Squadron RAF was re-numbered as No. 245 to form part of the RAF's first jet fighter equipped wing. It was equipped with Hawker Hunters when disbanded at RAF Stradishall on 3 June 1957. On 21 August 1958 No. 527 Squadron RAF was renumbered at RAF Watton as No 245 squadron. It was now employed on radar calibration duties with Canberra B.2s, moving to RAF Tangmere on 25 August 1958 and remained there until it was disbanded by being renumbered to No. 98 Squadron RAF on 18 April 1963.
