= Peter Gardner (RAF officer) =

British flying ace of the Second World War

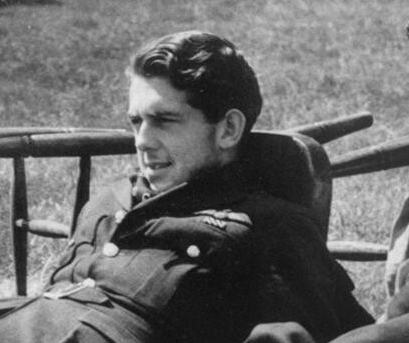
- Born: 1 July 1918; Grimsby, England
- Died: 23 May 1984 (aged 65); Bahamas
- Military career
- Allegiance: United Kingdom
- Branch: Royal Air Force
- Service years: 1937–1948
- Rank: Squadron Leader
- Units: No. 32 Squadron; No. 3 Squadron; No. 54 Squadron
- Conflicts: Second World War: Battle of France; Battle of Britain; Circus offensive
- Awards: Distinguished Flying Cross

Peter Melvill Gardner DFC (1 July 1918 – 23 May 1984) was a British flying ace of the Royal Air Force (RAF) during the Second World War. He was credited with at least ten aerial victories.

Born in Grimsby, Gardner joined the RAF in late 1937. In the early stages of the Second World War he served with No. 32 Squadron, but was transferred to No. 3 Squadron in May 1940, serving with this unit during the Battle of France and claiming several victories. He returned to No. 32 Squadron for the subsequent Battle of Britain and was heavily engaged in the fighting over Kent during July and August, achieving further aerial victories. In June 1941, he was posted to No. 54 Squadron, which was involved in the Circus offensive. He was shot down over France the following month and spent the remainder of the war as a prisoner of the Germans. In later life he was a restaurateur in the Bahamas. He died in 1984, aged 65. A photograph taken of Gardner and other pilots of No. 32 Squadron during the Battle of Britain inspired the ‘Spirit of The Few’ Monument at Hawkinge.

== Early life ==
Peter Melvill Gardner was born on 1 July 1918 in Grimsby, in England. He went to Imperial Service College at Windsor before going on to Eton House at Tonbridge School. Interested in aviation, he took private flying lessons and gained his pilot's licence from Norfolk & Norwich Aero Club in August 1936. Gardner joined the Royal Air Force (RAF) in November 1937 on a short service commission. He trained at No. 5 Flying Training School at Sealand and once this was completed in September the following year, he was posted to No. 32 Squadron as a pilot officer. At the time, the squadron was based at Biggin Hill and operated Hawker Hurricane fighters.

== Second World War ==
Following the outbreak of the Second World War, No. 32 Squadron was scrambled several times from Biggin Hill and, for a time, Gravesend, to intercept incoming Luftwaffe aircraft, but were mostly unsuccessful. In November, Gardner was briefly attached to the Royal Navy facilities at Harwich to train personnel in aircraft recognition. In May 1940, Gardner was attached to No. 3 Squadron in France. This was based at Merville with its Hurricanes, covering the retreat of the British Expeditionary Force from the advancing German forces following the invasion of France.

Gardner destroyed a Dornier Do 17 medium bomber over Sedan on 15 May. Three days later, he shared in the destruction of one German aircraft and damaged a Do 17 to the south of Douai. He shot down a Heinkel He 111 medium bomber near Renaire on 19 May but his own aircraft was damaged in the engagement, necessitating a crash landing of his Hurricane. The next day, to the east of Saint-Omer, he destroyed a Do 17. Within a few days of this aerial victory, No. 3 Squadron was withdrawn to England.

=== Battle of Britain ===
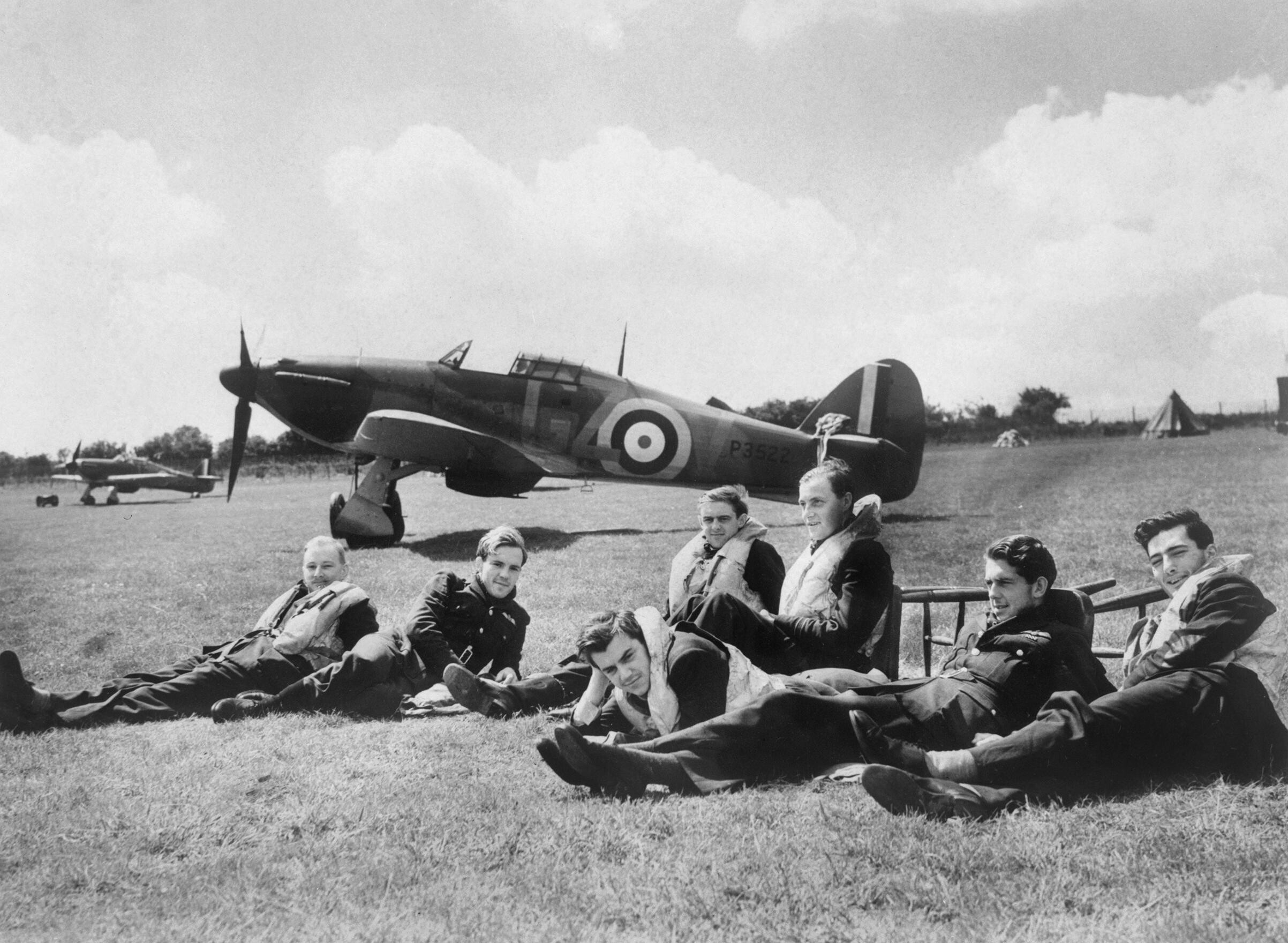
Pilots of 'B' Flight, No. 32 Squadron relax on the grass at Hawkinge in front of a Hawker Hurricane, with Gardner second from the right. This photograph is one of a series taken on 29 July 1940 which formed the inspiration for the 'Spirit of The Few' Monument, unveiled in 2022 at Hawkinge

Gardner returned to No. 32 Squadron, which was still at Biggin Hill, in late June. In the evening of 3 July Gardner shared in the destruction of a Do 17; he had led a section of the squadron that intercepted the bomberas it attempted to bomb Manston.

The Luftwaffe's campaign over the southeast of England had escalated by August, and Gardner and the other pilots of the squadron flew several sorties daily to intercept incoming bomber raids. On 11 August, on the squadron's second scramble of the day, Gardner damaged a Messerschmitt Bf 109 fighter and saw it disappear into cloud. The next day he shot down a Bf 109 into the sea off Deal after several squadrons were scrambled to intercept 100 bombers and escorting fighters. He also destroyed a Do 17 over the English Channel. On 15 August he destroyed a Junkers Ju 88 medium bomber to the southeast of Croydon. The following day, he shot down a Bf 109 to the east of Goodwin Sands. The squadron was rested on 28 August with a transfer to Acklington and at the end of the month, Gardner was promoted to flying officer and was awarded the Distinguished Flying Cross (DFC). The citation for his DFC, published in The London Gazette, which acknowledged his successes in France and Britain, read:

During a short time in France, this officer succeeded in destroying four enemy aircraft. Since returning to this country he has destroyed a further five enemy aircraft and possibly several others. He has displayed great keenness and courage.

— The London Gazette, No. 34935, 30 August 1940.

=== Subsequent war service ===
No. 32 Squadron carried out training in night fighting duties while at Acklington and then, in January 1941, moved to Middle Wallop and then Ibsley, from where it was mostly engaged in patrol duties. By this time, Gardner was an acting flight lieutenant. In June, he was posted to No. 54 Squadron as a flight commander. Equipped with Supermarine Spitfire fighters, this was based at Hornchurch from where it carried out offensive sorties to German-occupied Europe as part of the RAF's Circus offensive. On 17 June, shortly after his arrival at the squadron, he destroyed a Bf 109 near Cap Gris-Nez. On 11 July, No. 54 Squadron was escorting Short Stirling heavy bombers attacking rail yards at Hazebrouck when it was intercepted by several Bf 109s. Gardner's Spitfire was hit and he baled out and was captured by the Germans.

Gardner spent the remainder of the war as a prisoner, including a period at Stalag Luft III. He attempted to escape on multiple occasions but was never successful and only released upon being liberated at the end of the war in Europe.

== Later life ==
Gardner remained in the RAF in the postwar period but left the service in July 1948 with the rank of squadron leader. Returning to civilian life, he settled in the Bahamas. In 1956 he opened a restaurant in Nassau and this became very popular and a hot spot for visiting celebrities. In the early 1980s, his health began to declined and Gardner sold the restaurant. He died in the Bahamas on 23 May 1984, aged 65. He is credited with the destruction of ten aircraft, two shared with other pilots, and one damaged.

Gardner is remembered in a memorial, the ‘Spirit of The Few’ Monument, unveiled on 29 July 2022 at Hawkinge airfield. He is represented as one of seven bronze sculptures of pilots of No. 32 Squadron, replicating a photograph taken of the men during the Battle of Britain.
