= Bristol Blenheim =

British medium bomber in World War II

Blenheim (Types 142M, 149, 160)
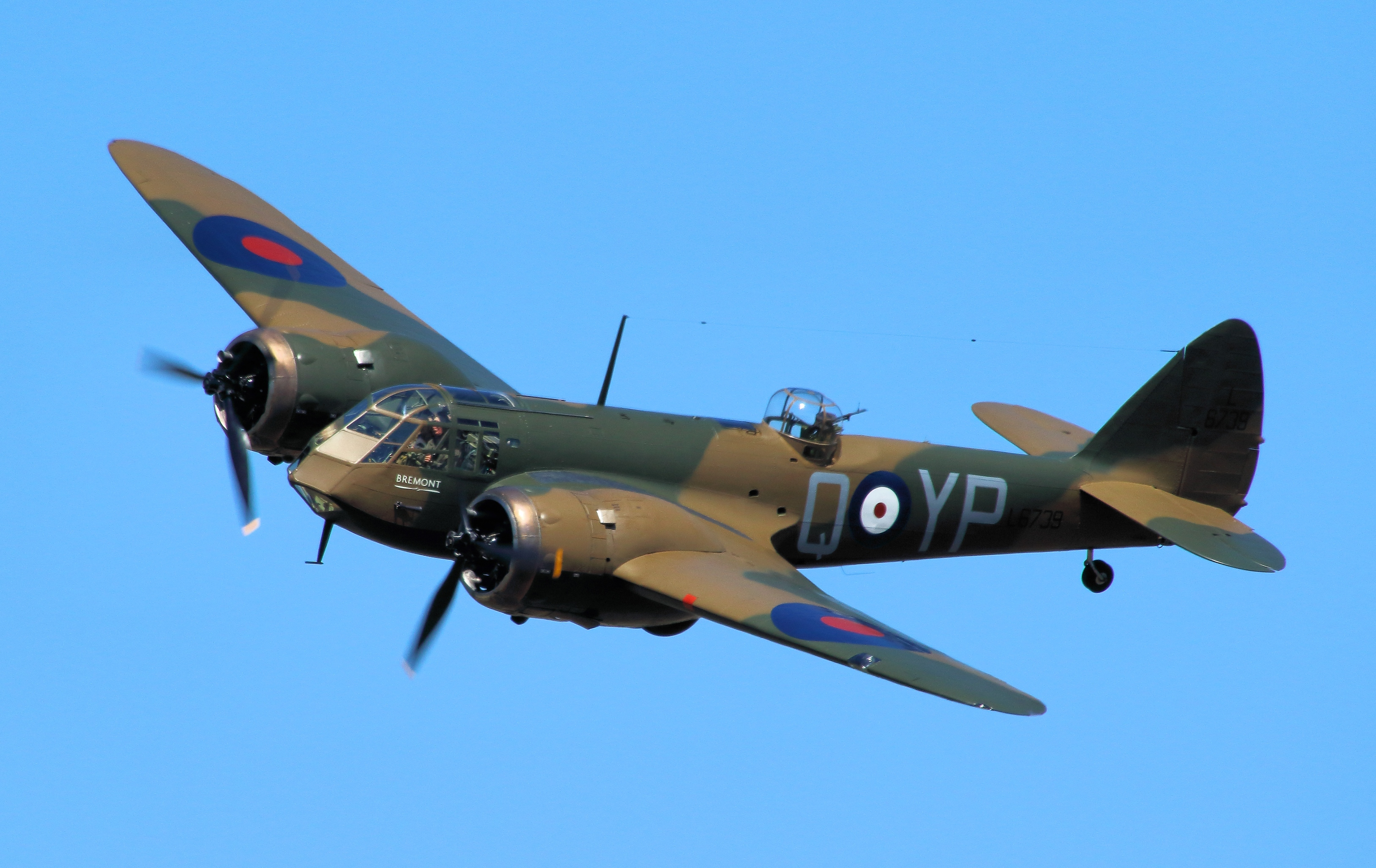
- A Blenheim with the short Mk.I nose at RIAT, 2015

General information
- Type: Medium bomber; Night fighter; Reconnaissance
- Manufacturer: Bristol Aeroplane Company
- Designer: Frank Barnwell
- Primary users: Royal Air Force Royal Canadian Air Force; Finnish Air Force; Royal Yugoslav Air Force
- Number built: 4,422

History
- Introduction date: 1937
- First flight: 12 April 1935
- Retired: 1944 (United Kingdom); 1958 (Finland)
- Variants: Bristol Beaufort; Bristol Fairchild Bolingbroke

The Bristol Blenheim is a British light bomber designed and built by the Bristol Aeroplane Company, which was used extensively in the first two years of the Second World War, with examples still being used as trainers until the end of the war. Development began with the Type 142, a civil airliner, after a challenge from the newspaper proprietor Lord Rothermere to produce the fastest commercial aircraft in Europe. The Type 142 first flew in April 1935, and the Air Ministry ordered a bomber development as the Type 142M for the Royal Air Force (RAF).

Deliveries of the Blenheim to RAF squadrons commenced on 10 March 1937. In service the Type 142M became the Blenheim Mk.I which would be developed into the long-nosed Type 149, the Blenheim Mk.IV, while in Canada Fairchild Canada built the Type 149 under licence as the Bolingbroke. The Type 160 Bisley was also developed from the Blenheim.

Both versions were converted into heavy night fighters by the addition of a gun pack with four Browning .303 in (7.7 mm) machine guns mounted under the fuselage. The Mk.IV was also used as a maritime patrol aircraft and both versions were also used as bombing and gunnery trainers once they had become obsolete as combat aircraft.

The Blenheim was one of the first British aircraft with an all-metal stressed-skin construction, retractable landing gear, flaps, a powered gun turret and variable-pitch propellers. The Mk.I was faster than the RAF's biplane fighters in the late 1930s but advances soon left it vulnerable if flown in the day, though it proved successful as a night fighter. Both Blenheim types were used by foreign operators and examples were licence built in Canada, Yugoslavia and Finland.

== Development ==
=== Origins ===
In 1933 Frank Barnwell, Bristol's chief designer, went to the United States to collect information on their latest twin-engined, low-wing monoplane airliners. When he returned he discussed one of them, the Lockheed Model 12 Electra Junior, with Roy Fedden and prepared a comparable design using Fedden's Bristol Aquila engine which produced 500 hp (370 kW), the same power as in the Electra. Sir Archibald Russell described Barnwell's design as "close to being a replica of the Electra". It was designated Type 135.

In early 1934, Lord Rothermere, owner of the Daily Mail newspaper, challenged the British aviation industry to build a high-speed aircraft capable of carrying six passengers and two crew members which he referred to as seeking "the fastest commercial aeroplane in Europe, if not the world". German firms were producing record-breaking high-speed designs, such as the Heinkel He 70, and Rothermere wanted the prestige of having the fastest civilian aircraft. Rothermere also intended to encourage businesses and key figures to make greater use of civil aviation and to demonstrate to the British Air Ministry how their fighters may not be able to match modern transport aircraft, which may be easily converted to, or used as the basis for, bomber aircraft.

Rothermere became aware of Bristol's Type 135 proposal and on 3 March 1934, Barnwell issued him with a quote of the specification and performance statistics, including an estimated top speed of 240 mph (390 km/h) at 6,500 ft (2,000 m). The Aquila engine had been shelved in favour of the supercharger-equipped, poppet-valve Bristol Mercury engine. The Type 135 was further adapted to produce the Type 142 to meet the requirements outlined by Rothermere. In late March 1934, Rothermere ordered one Type 142 aircraft, which he paid for half of the estimated £18,500 cost up front and the remainder following its first flight in the following year.

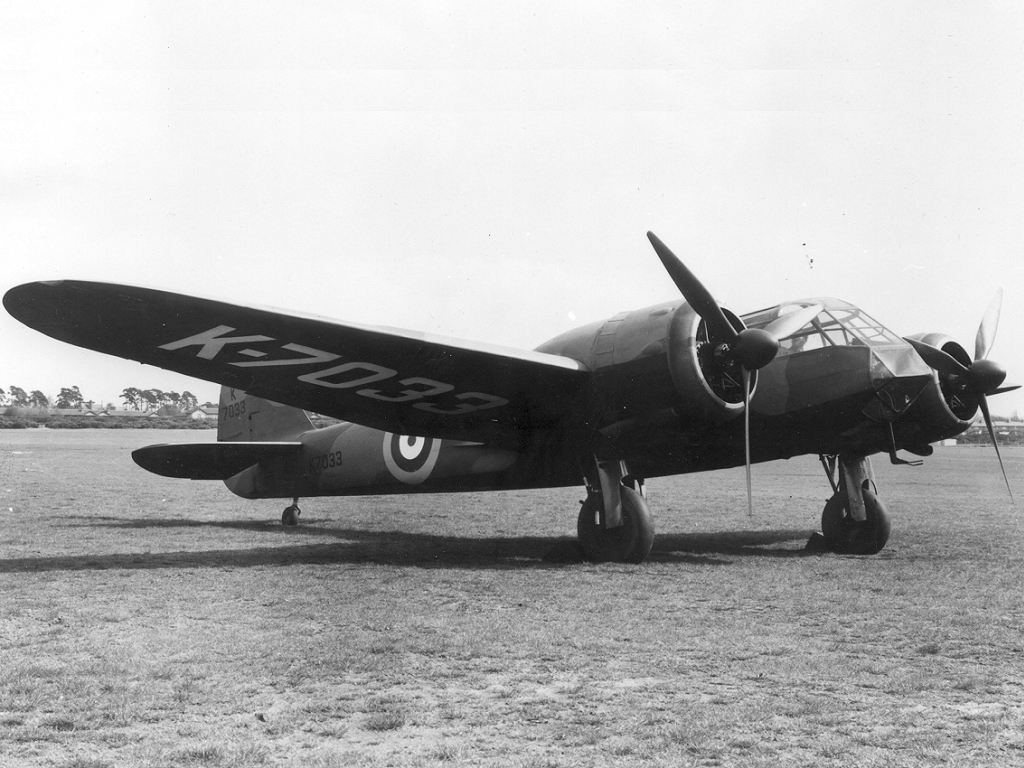
The first 142M with the military serial K7033, which served as the only prototype. It first flew in June 1936.

On 12 April 1935, the Type 142, named Britain First, conducted its first flight from Filton Aerodrome, South Gloucestershire. Flight tests soon proved that the aircraft was faster than the fighters in service with the Royal Air Force (RAF), having a top speed of 307 mph (494 km/h). Rothermere presented the aircraft to the nation for a formal evaluation as a bomber. In June 1935, the Air Ministry showed interest due to its performance. On 9 July 1935, a design conference was held by Bristol at the ministry's request to convert the Type 142 into a bomber.

The Air Ministry formalised Specification B.28/35 for prototypes of a bomber version which was designated the Type 142M (M for military) by Bristol. A significant change between the Type 142M bomber and its Type 142 predecessor was the raising of the wing from a low-wing to a mid-wing position, which allowed for enough space under the main spar to accommodate a bomb bay. Other modifications included the addition of a bomb-aimer's position and a Browning machine gun in the port wing, along with provisions for a semi-retractable dorsal gun turret.

=== Production ===
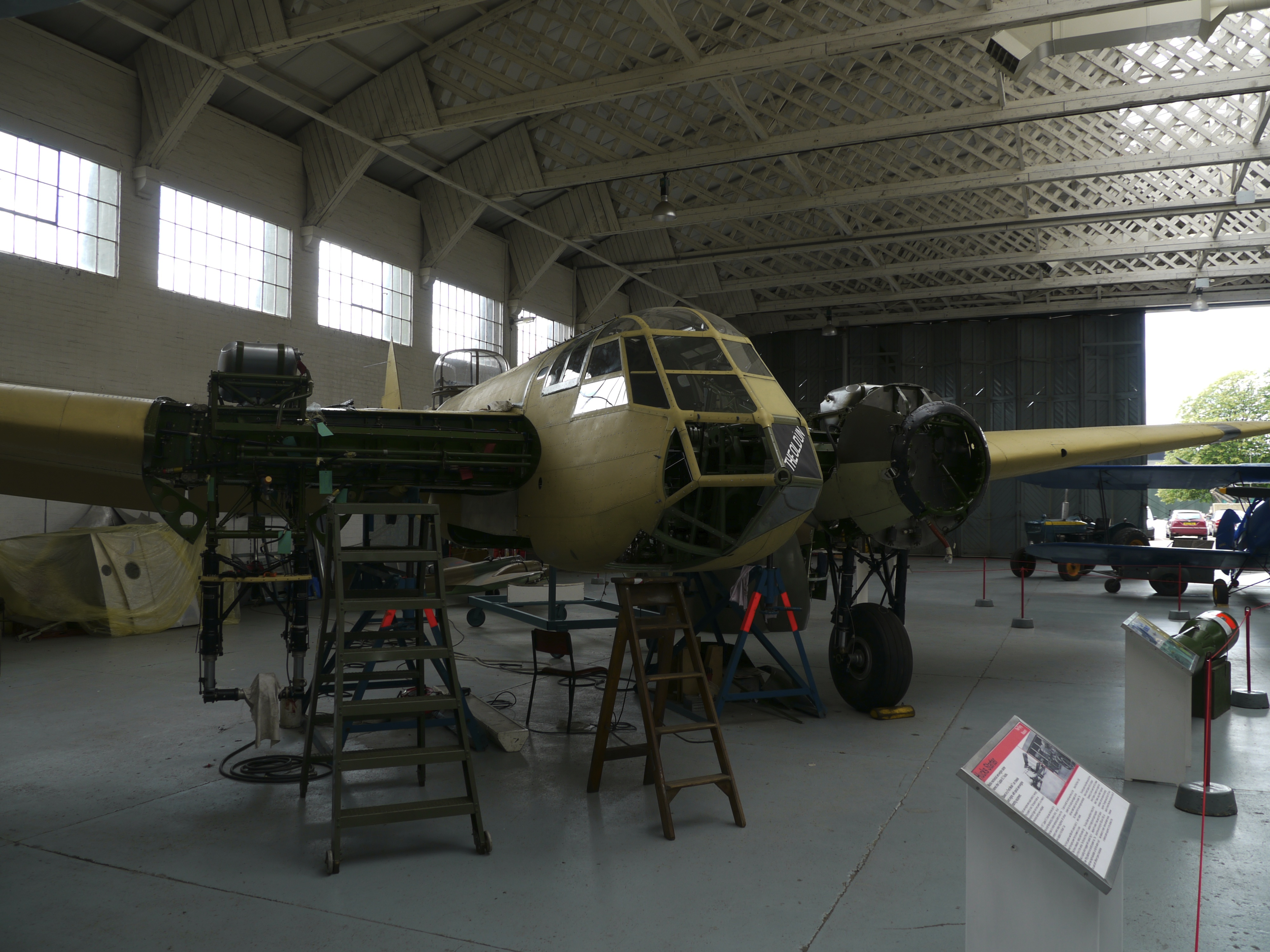
Blenheim Mk.I reconstruction by the Aircraft Restoration Co at Duxford, for the owners, Blenheim (Duxford) Ltd. It is based on a Bolingbroke airframe with Blenheim Mk.I nose section.

In September 1935, the Air Ministry placed a contract for 150 aircraft directly from the drawing board, in a wider part of the rapid expansion of the RAF. The first example, K7033, served as the sole prototype and on 25 June 1936, it made its first flight from Filton. The service name for the aircraft became Blenheim Mk.I after the War of the Spanish Succession's Battle of Blenheim. On 10 March 1937, deliveries to the RAF started and 114 Squadron became the first to receive the Blenheim. On 13 January 1938, the Blenheim entered service with No. 30 Squadron, the first overseas squadron and in early 1939, the first Blenheims arrived in India.

From July 1936 onwards, various additional orders were placed for the Blenheim Mk.I, including multiple orders for the export market. By the end of 1936, 1,568 aircraft were on order. In order to meet the demand, secondary assembly lines were established at Chadderton by Avro and at Speke by Rootes Securities. The aircraft was built under licence by foreign countries, including Finland, who completed a total of 55 aircraft, and Yugoslavia, which completed 16 aircraft with a further 24 in advanced stages of completion when Germany invaded Yugoslavia. Other countries also procured the Blenheim, including Romania, Greece and Turkey. By September 1939, orders for the Blenheim had risen to 2,088 aircraft. Total production of the Blenheim Mk.I in England was 1,351 aircraft prior to the end of the production run in 1939; production had been terminated in favour of more advanced variants.

=== Further development ===
The Blenheim production programme saw several shifts in requirements and in capacity. A modified Blenheim design, given the name Bolingbroke, was manufactured under licence in Canada by Fairchild Aircraft. The Bolingbroke, which had been developed in response to Air Ministry Specification G.24/35 to procure a coastal reconnaissance bomber as a replacement for the Avro Anson, had substantial improvements that would serve as the basis for improved variants of the Blenheim. Both the navigator's station and range limitations of the Blenheim Mk.I had been subject to considerable criticism, prompting the development of an improved model to rectify the shortcomings. On 24 September 1937, an experimental Blenheim Mk.I, modified with an extended forward fuselage beyond its original stepless cockpit, smooth-fronted nose enclosure, made its first flight from Filton.

Formal work on an extended-range reconnaissance version started as the Blenheim Mk.II, which increased tankage from 278 to 468 imp gal (1,260 to 2,130 L; 334 to 562 US gal). Only one Blenheim Mk.II was completed, as flight tests revealed the increase in speed to be marginal and not warranting further development. Another modification resulted in the Blenheim Mk.III, which lengthened the nose, dispensing with the "stepless cockpit" format of the Mk.I, introducing a true windscreen in front of the pilot, to provide more room for the bomb aimer. This required the nose to be "scooped out" in front of the pilot to maintain visibility during takeoff and landing. Both modifications were combined, along with a newer version of the Mercury engine with 905 hp (675 kW). The turret acquired a pair of Brownings in place of the original single Vickers K gun, creating the Blenheim Mk.IV.

In early 1939, the first batch of Blenheim Mk.IVs were accepted into service; these lacked outer fuel tanks but were accepted due to the urgent demand for the type. Early Blenheim Mk.IVs were also equipped with the Mercury VIII engine, most were fitted with the more powerful Mercury XV or Mercury 25 models. Further aircraft deliveries were made to the production standard and were primarily manufactured by Avro and Rootes. Production of the Blenheim IV continued until June 1943, when newcomers such as the Beaufort-derived Beaufighter had succeeded the type. A total of 3,307 were produced.

A long-range fighter version, the Blenheim Mk.IF, was also developed. For this role, about 200 Blenheims were fitted with a gun pack under the fuselage for four .303 in (7.7 mm) Brownings. Later, the Airborne Intercept (AI) Mk.III or IV radar was fitted to some aircraft in use as night fighters; these were the first British fighters to be equipped with radar. The Blenheim had been selected as the first aircraft to be adapted for this role as its fuselage was sufficiently roomy to accommodate the additional crew member and radar apparatus. Their performance was marginal as a fighter but they served as an interim type pending availability of the more capable Beaufighter derivative. About 60 Mk.IVs were also equipped with the gun pack as the Mk.IVF and were used by Coastal Command to protect convoys from German long-range bombers.

The last bomber variant was conceived as an armoured ground attack aircraft, with a solid nose containing four more Browning machine guns. Originally known as the Bisley, (after the shooting competitions held at Bisley Ranges), the production aircraft were renamed Blenheim Mk.V and featured a strengthened structure, pilot armour, interchangeable nose gun pack or bomb-aimer position and another Mercury variant with 950 hp (710 kW). The Mk.V was ordered for conventional bombing operations, with the removal of armour and most of the glazed nose section. The Mk.V (Type 160) was used primarily in the Middle East and Far East. The Blenheim served as the basis for the Beaufort torpedo bomber, which led to the Beaufighter, with the lineage performing two evolutions of bomber-to-fighter.

== Design ==
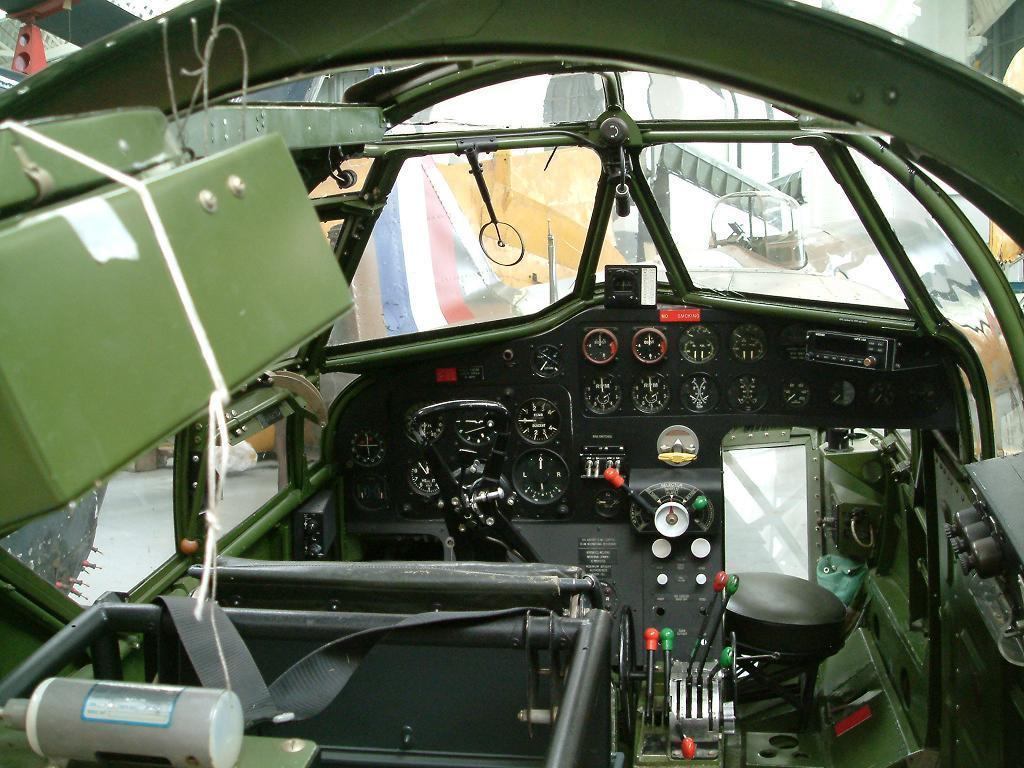
Bolingbroke Mk.IV cockpit. The Blenheim Mk.IV was similar, but had a shorter instrument console. The navigator was in the nose. The gunsight for the forward firing gun is visible.

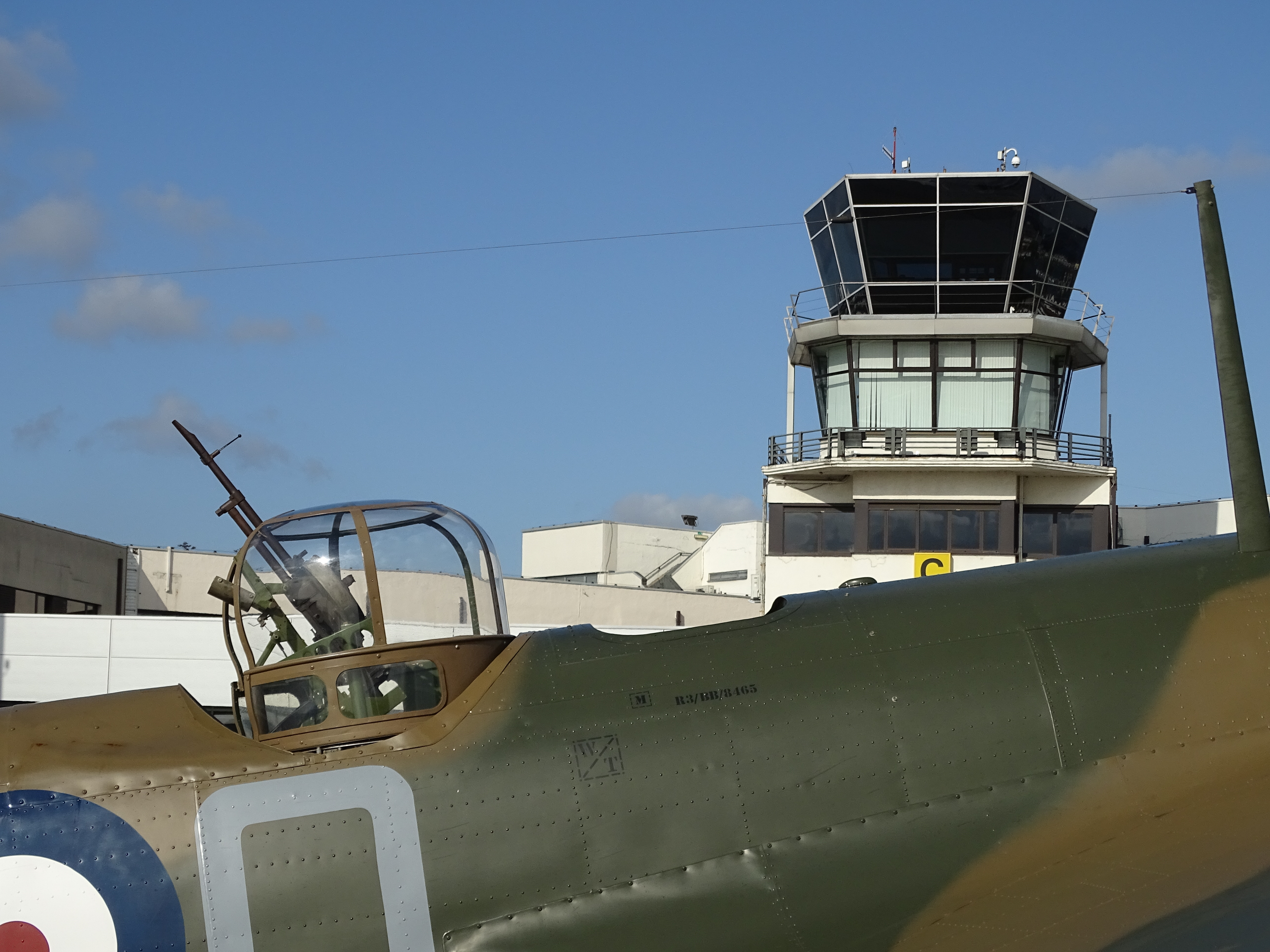
Blenheim dorsal gun turret which could be partially lowered to reduce drag.

The Bristol Blenheim was a twin-engine high performance all-metal medium bomber aircraft, powered by a pair of Bristol Mercury VIII air-cooled radial engines, each capable of 860 hp (640 kW). Each engine drove a three-bladed controllable-pitch propeller, and were equipped with both hand-based and electric engine starters. To ease maintenance, the engine mountings were designed with a split-segment to facilitate rapid engine removal without disturbing the carburettors. A pair of fuel tanks, each containing up to 140 imp gal (640 L; 170 US gal), were housed within the centre-section of the fuselage.

The fuselage of the Blenheim employed a light-alloy monocoque structure using open-section stringers, and was constructed in three sections. The wing is also built in three sections, the centre-section of which is bolted and rivetted to the fuselage. The outer wing sections are tapered in chord and thickness. Extensive use of Alclad sheeting is made in elements such as the ribs, skin, flaps, and web reinforcement of the spars. The tail unit is of a cantilever monoplane style, using an all-metal tailplane and fin while the aerodynamically balanced rudder and elevators use a metal frame covered with fabric. The undercarriage was hydraulically-retracted, with an auxiliary hand-pump for emergency actuation; medium-pressure tyres were used, complete with pneumatically-actuated differentially-control brakes.

The Blenheim typically carried a crew of three – pilot, navigator/bombardier and wireless (radio) operator/air gunner. The pilot's quarters on the left side of the nose were so cramped that the control yoke obscured all flight instruments while engine instruments eliminated the forward view on landings. Most secondary instruments were arranged along the left side of the cockpit, essential items such as the propeller pitch control were actually placed behind the pilot where they had to be operated by feel alone. The navigator/bombardier was seated alongside the pilot, and made use of a sliding/folding seat whilst performing the bomb aiming role. Dual flight controls could be installed. The wireless operator/air gunner was housed aft of the wing alongside the aircraft's dorsal gun turret.

Armament comprised a single forward-firing .303 in (7.7 mm) Browning machine gun outboard of the port engine and a .303 in (7.7 mm) Lewis Gun in a semi-retracting Bristol Type B Mk.I dorsal turret firing to the rear. From 1939, the Lewis gun was replaced by the more modern .303 in (7.7 mm) Vickers VGO machine-gun. A 1,000 lb (450 kg) bomb load could be carried in the internal bomb bay set into the centre section of the fuselage. Like most contemporary British aircraft, the bomb bay doors were kept closed with bungee cords and opened under the weight of the released bombs. Because there was no way to predict how long it would take for the bombs to force the doors open, bombing accuracy was consequently poor. The bomb bay could be loaded using a hand-operated winch incorporated into the fuselage.

To achieve its relatively high speed, the Blenheim used a very small fuselage cross-section, with its upper front glazing all at one angle in the form of a "stepless cockpit" that used no separate windscreen panels for the pilot, a notable feature of a substantial majority of German bomber designs, first conceived during the war years. Both fixed and sliding window panels were present, along with a transparent sliding roof. Other onboard equipment included a radio, cameras, navigation systems, electric lighting, oxygen apparatus, and stowage for parachutes and clothing.

== Operational history ==
=== Outbreak of war ===
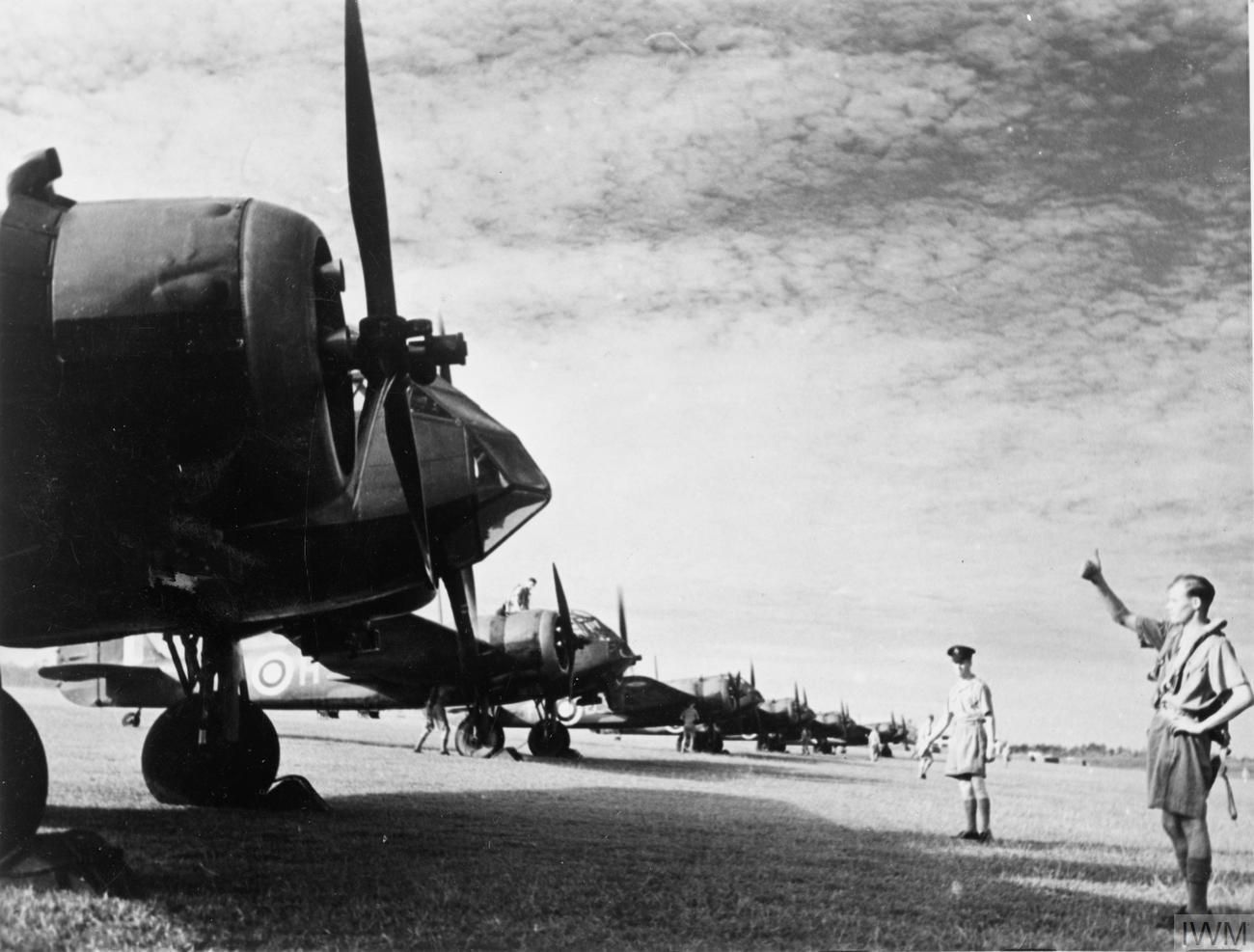
Blenheim Mk.Is of No. 62 Squadron RAF lined up at RAF Tengah, Singapore, c. February 1941

In September 1939, the month in which the Second World War broke out, the Blenheim Mk.I equipped two home-based squadrons and 11 overseas squadrons in locations such as Egypt, Aden, Iraq, India, and Singapore. Further RAF squadrons had received, or were in the process of converting to, the more capable Blenheim Mk.IV and 168 Blenheim Mk.IV aircraft had entered RAF operational strength by the outbreak of war.

On the day that war was declared on Germany, a Blenheim Mk.IV, N6215, piloted by Flying Officer Andrew McPherson was the first British aircraft to cross the German coast to perform a high altitude reconnaissance mission, made on the German Navy near Wilhelmshaven. The following morning, 15 Blenheims from three squadrons set off on one of the first bombing missions to attack ships spotted the previous day. The raid was a failure, only nine aircraft attacked, and only superficial damage was done to the cruiser Emden, when one of No. 107 Squadron's Blenheims crashed into the cruiser, killing 11 crewmen. RAF Coastal Command were soon using the Blenheim to protect British shipping convoys off the east coast.

Shortly after the conflict's start, the RAF Advanced Air Striking Force (AASF) was deployed to numerous airfields in France, allowing for shorter bombing missions against German targets. Several squadrons of Blenheim IVs were assigned to the AASF, being frequently used against targets in France and the Low Countries once the Battle of France had begun. Blenheims were also assigned to the air component of the British Expeditionary Force of the Army.

In May 1940, AASF and BEF Blenheims participated in the Battle of France, being sent against German forces advancing towards Brussels, resulting in many aircraft sustaining heavy damage or being lost to enemy fire. German attacks upon the French airfields also damaged a considerable number of Blenheims on the ground. On 14 May, a combined force of Fairey Battles and Blenheims was dispatched on a counter-attack on German forces breaking through defensive lines but 40 out of 71 aircraft were lost in this sortie. This is the worst losses proportionally taken by the RAF. Further action by Blenheims of Bomber Command that day sustained 25% losses despite heavy British fighter cover. Shortly thereafter, the heavily depleted squadrons were withdrawn to Britain. Around 50 Blenheims supported the Dunkirk evacuation by harassing enemy forces.

Rapid advances in technology in the late 1930s rendered the Blenheim obsolescent by 1939. In particular, it had become heavier as extra service equipment was installed that was found to be necessary through operational experience. This, coupled with the rapid performance increases of the fighters that would oppose it, had eclipsed the Blenheim's speed advantage. In January 1941, the Air Staff classified the Blenheim as inadequate in terms of performance and armament for current operations.

The light armament was unable to deter fighter opposition. Squadrons were forced to improvise a better defensive armament, until officially sanctioned modifications were introduced in early 1940. The Blenheim also proved to be vulnerable to anti-aircraft artillery, especially around the rear fuselage. Flexible, self-sealing liners had been fitted to the fuel tanks but they were still not fully protected against the 0.79 in (20 mm) MG FF cannon carried by the Luftwaffe's Messerschmitt Bf 109 and Bf 110 fighters.

=== Home front ===
Blenheim squadrons were still in demand after their withdrawal from France as part of the British action during the Norwegian campaign. Typically operating from bases in northern Britain, such as RAF Lossiemouth, flying for extended periods over the North Sea led to the weather posing almost as much of a risk as enemy combatants, particularly as most of the Blenheim IVs lacked heating or deicing systems and in response, some aircraft were fitted with boilers on the starboard engine exhaust. Heavy losses occurred, caused by both enemy action and engine failures due to icing.

After the fall of France in June 1940, the Free French Air Force was formed at RAF Odiham, Hampshire, in the form of Groupe Mixte de Combat (GMC) 1, consisting of a mixed bag of Blenheims and Westland Lysander liaison/observation aircraft, which were later dispatched to North Africa and saw action against Italian and German forces.

Blenheim units operated throughout the Battle of Britain, often taking heavy casualties, although they were never accorded the publicity of the fighter squadrons. From July to December 1940, Blenheims raided German-occupied airfields both in daylight and at night. Although most of these raids were unproductive, there were some successes; on 1 August five out of twelve Blenheims sent to attack Haamstede and Evere (Brussels) were able to bomb, damaging (50 per cent, 40 per cent and 10 per cent) three Bf 109Es of II./JG 27 at Leuwarden and apparently killing a Staffelkapitän identified as Hauptmann Albrecht von Ankum-Frank. Two other 109s were claimed by Blenheim gunners.^{[f]} Another successful raid on Haamstede was made by a single Blenheim on 7 August which destroyed one 109 of 4./JG 54, heavily damaged another, and caused lighter damage to four more.

There were also some missions which produced an almost 100% casualty rate amongst the Blenheims. One such operation was mounted on 13 August 1940 against a Luftwaffe airfield near Aalborg in north-western Denmark by twelve aircraft of 82 Squadron. One Blenheim returned early (the pilot was later charged but was killed on another operation before a court martial was held) while the other eleven, which reached Denmark, were shot down, five by flak and six by Bf 109s. Blenheim units had also been formed to carry out long-range strategic reconnaissance missions over Germany and German-occupied territories. In this role, the Blenheims once again proved to be too slow and vulnerable against Luftwaffe fighters and they took constant casualties.

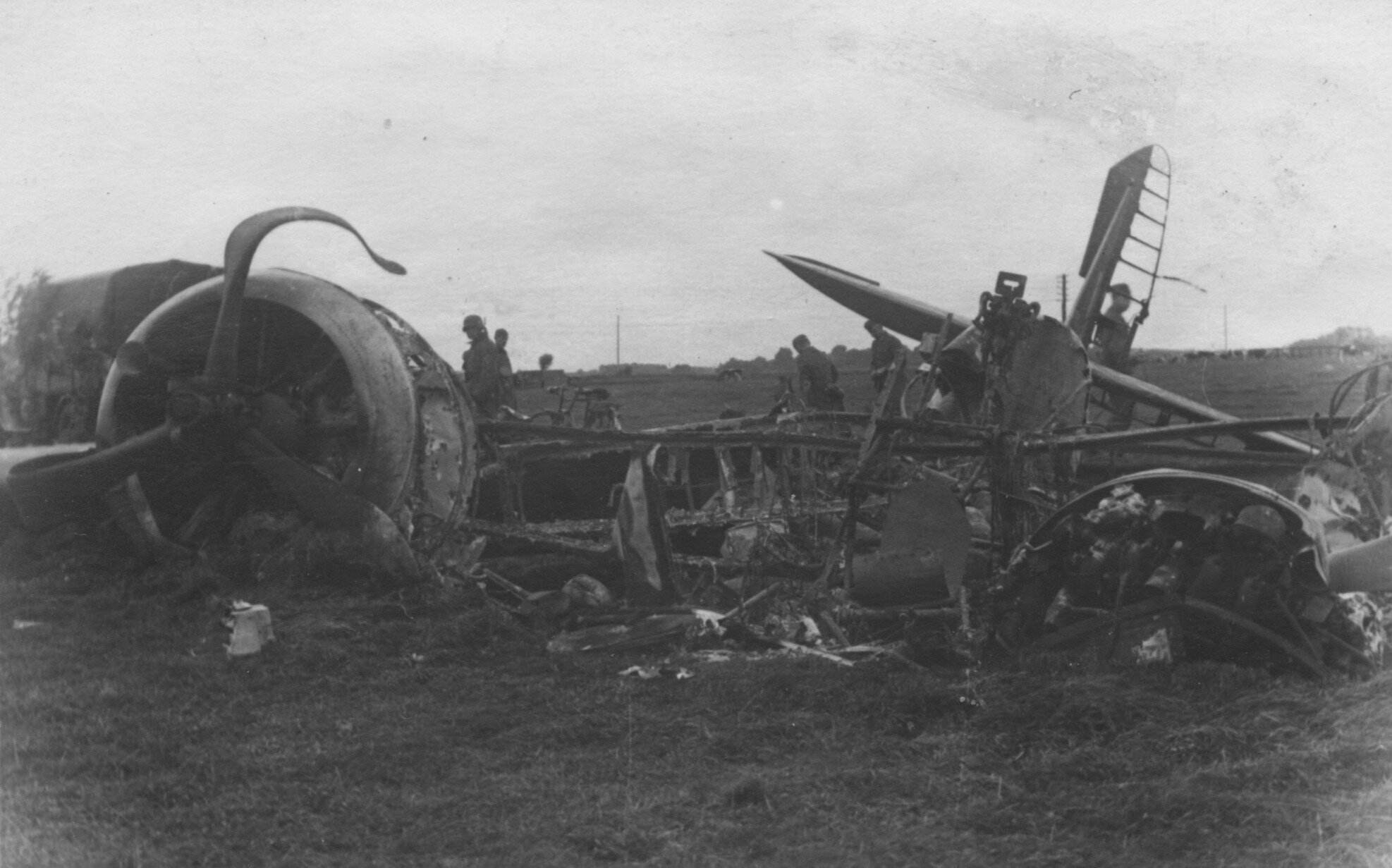
Wreckage of a Blenheim shot down over the Occupied Netherlands on 15 February 1941

On 12 August 1941, an action described by The Daily Telegraph in 2006 as being the "RAF's most audacious and dangerous low-level bombing raid, a large-scale attack against power stations near Cologne" took place. The raid was a low-level daylight raid by 54 Blenheims under the command of Wing Commander Nichol of 114 Squadron. They hit their targets (Fortuna Power Station in Oberaußem-Fortuna and the Goldenberg Power Station in Hürth-Knapsack), but twelve of the Blenheims were lost during the raid, 22% of those that took part, which was far above the sustainable loss rate of less than 5%. The England cricketer Squadron leader Bill Edrich was awarded the DFC for his part in the raid.

From 5 September 1940 Blenheims of Bomber Command began a bombing campaign targeting German-occupied ports along the English Channel, alongside heavier bomber types. Bomber Command Blenheims also performed anti-shipping patrols due to Coastal Command's own strike squadrons being heavily depleted throughout the latter half of 1940. On 11 March 1940, a Blenheim IV, P4852, became the first RAF aircraft to sink a U-boat, having scored two direct hits on U-31 in the Schillig Roads. In April 1941, a campaign aiming to completely close off the Channel to enemy shipping was launched using an initial flight of Blenheims stationed at RAF Manston. Between April and June that year, a total of 297 Blenheims of No 2. Group attacked German shipping at sea, losing 36 aircraft, while Coastal Command launched 143 attacks in the same period, losing 52 aircraft; by the end of the year, 698 ships had been attacked and 41 of these sunk for the loss of 123 aircraft.

==== Fighter operations ====
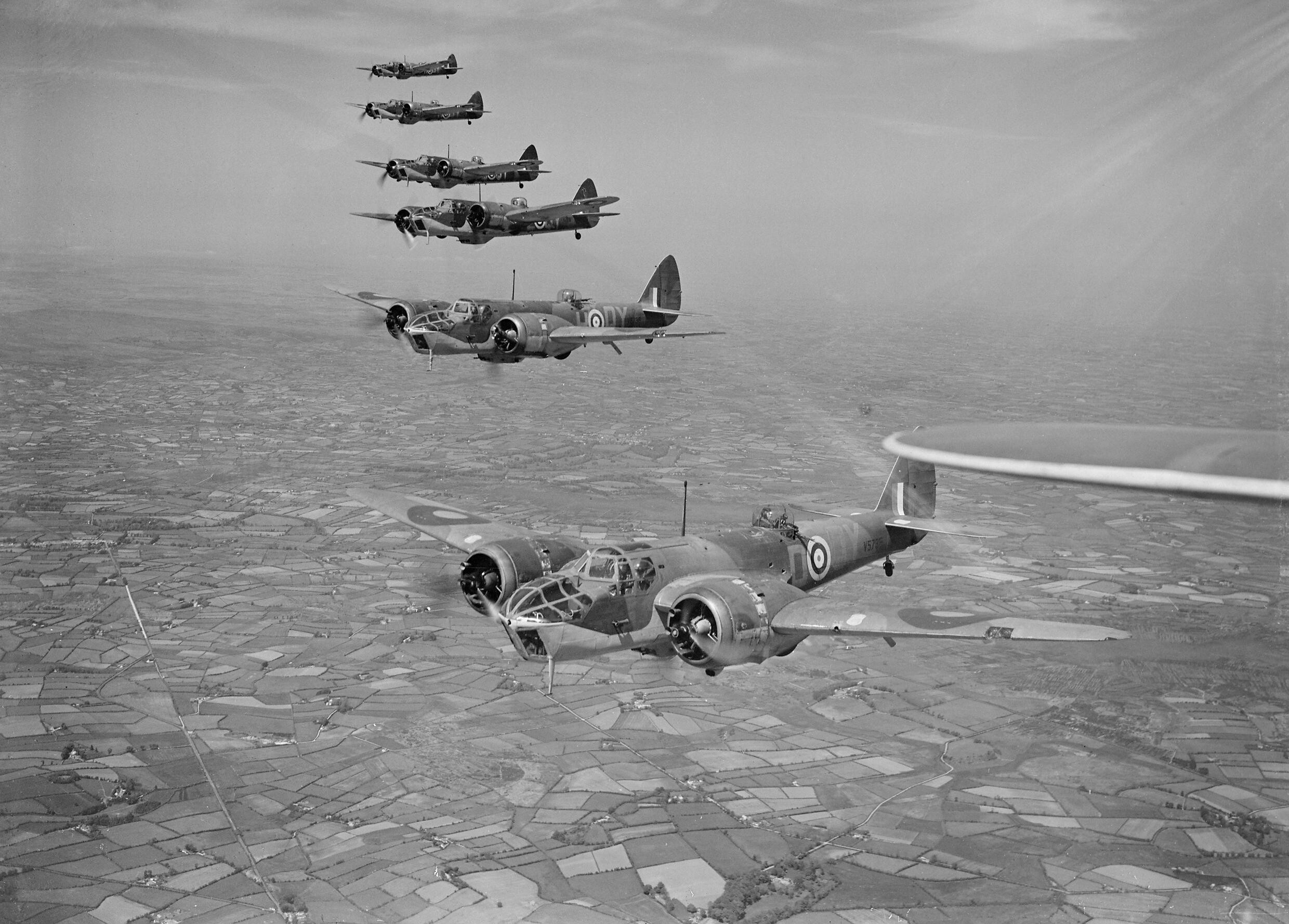
Formation of Blenheim IVFs in flight

The Bristol Blenheim was used by both Bomber and Fighter Commands. About two hundred Mk.I bombers were modified into Mk.IF long-range fighters with 600 Squadron (Auxiliary Air Force) based at Hendon, the first squadron to take delivery in September 1938. By 1939, at least seven squadrons were operating them as fighters, increasing to about 60 squadrons within a few months. The Mk.IF proved to be slower and less manoeuvrable than expected, and by June 1940 daylight Blenheim losses caused concern for Fighter Command. The Mk.IF was relegated mainly to night fighter duties where 23 Squadron, which had already operated them at night, soon relegated them to night intruder operations as they were not effective as night fighters.

In the German night-bombing raid on London on 18 June 1940, Blenheims accounted for five German bombers, thus proving that they were better-suited for night fighting. In July, No. 600 Squadron, by then based at RAF Manston, had some of its Mk.IFs equipped with AI Mk.III radar. With this radar equipment, a Blenheim from the Fighter Interception Unit (FIU) at RAF Ford achieved the first success on the night of 2–3 July 1940, accounting for a Dornier Do 17 bomber. The Blenheim was replaced by the faster and more heavily armed Bristol Beaufighter in 1940–1941.

=== Mediterranean and Middle East ===
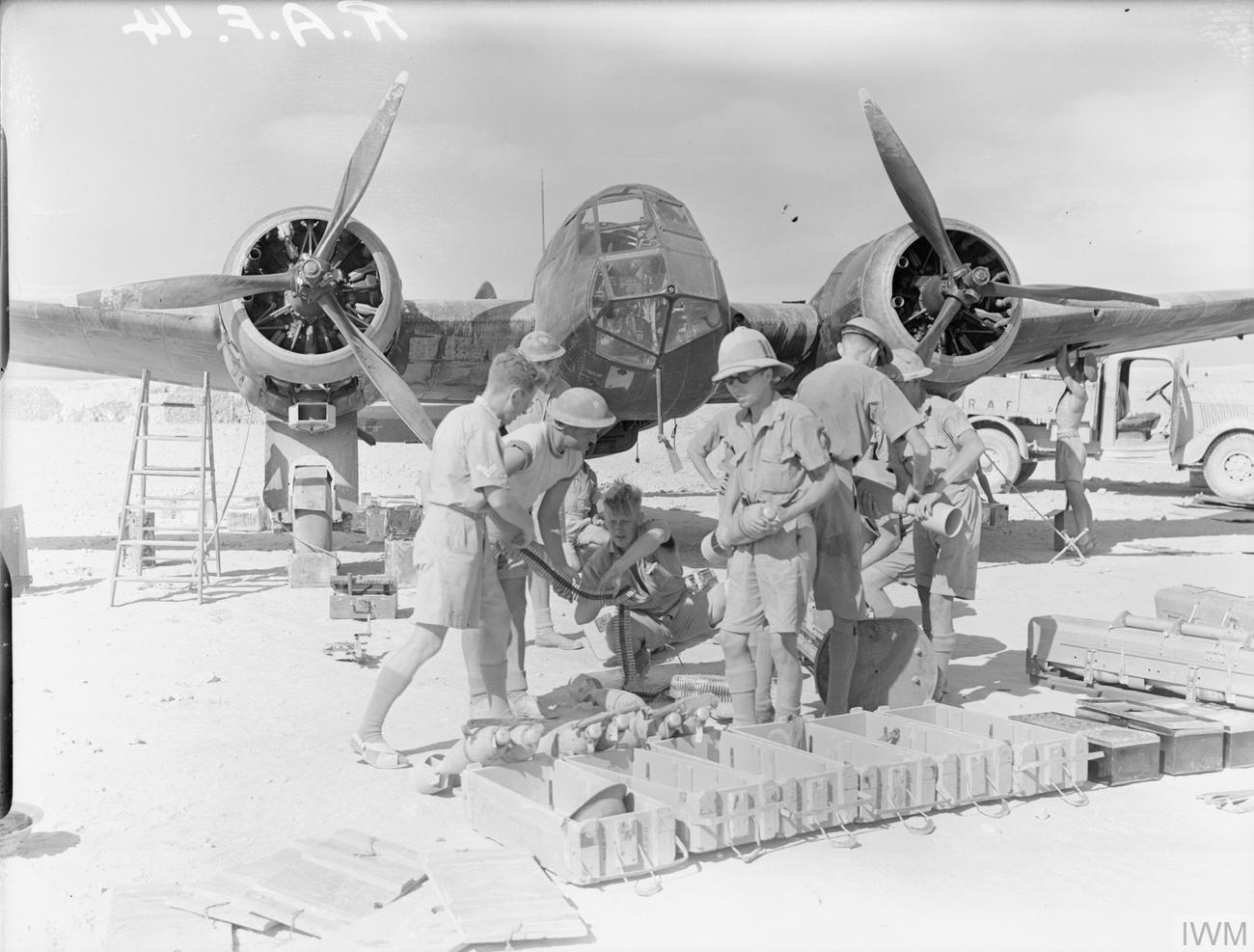
Armourers of No. 113 Squadron preparing to load a Blenheim Mk.I prior to a raid on Tobruk, Libya, c. 1942

On 11 June 1940, only hours after Italy's entry into the war on Germany's side, several Blenheim IVs bombed Italian positions. In mid-1940, reinforcement ferry routes were established throughout Africa, starting in Takoradi on the Gold Coast. By the end of 1940, a total of three RAF squadrons equipped with Blenheim IV aircraft were performing anti-shipping, bombing, and reconnaissance missions in support of Allied ground forces in North Africa.

By July 1941, it had been recognised that, in response to the increasing intensity of combat in North Africa and in the Middle East theatres, additional squadrons were urgently required. In the latter half of 1941, several Blenheim squadrons were flown out to Malta, many being stationed there into early 1942 before mainly being absorbed in the Western Desert air operations. As Bomber Command gradually took Blenheims out of the Northern Europe theatre, they were often dispatched to other areas such as North Africa. Upon the outbreak of the Pacific War in December 1941, some Blenheim squadrons in the Middle East were relocated from the theatre to the Far East in response to the new threat from Japanese forces.

=== South East Asia ===
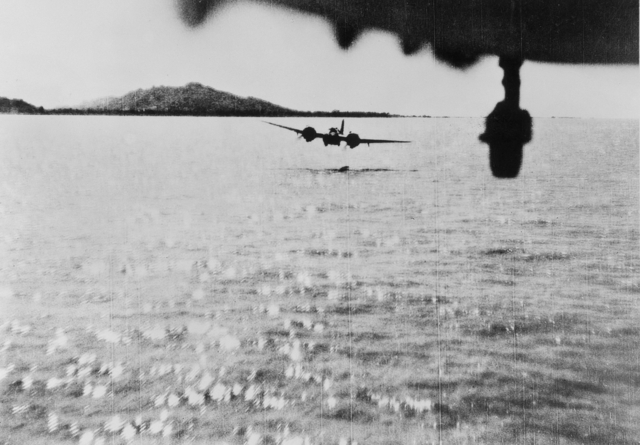
Blenheims of No. 60 Squadron RAF flying low to attack a Japanese coaster off Akyab, Burma on 11 October 1942

Blenheims continued to operate widely in many combat roles until about 1943, equipping RAF squadrons in the UK and at British bases in Aden, India, British Malaya, Singapore, and the Dutch East Indies. Many Blenheims were lost to Japanese fighters during the Malayan Campaign and the battles for Singapore and Sumatra. By that point, the day bomber role was more effectively carried out by fighter-bombers, and the surviving examples were relegated to training duties. Nonetheless, the Blenheim played a role in preventing India from falling and in recapturing Burma, destroyed over 60 aircraft on the ground in raids on Bangkok early in the campaign.

One Blenheim pilot, Squadron Leader Arthur Scarf, was posthumously awarded the Victoria Cross for an attack on Singora, Thailand, on 9 December 1941. Another bomber of No. 60 Squadron RAF was credited with shooting down Lt Col Tateo Katō's Nakajima Ki-43 fighter and badly damaging two others in a single engagement on 22 May 1942, over the Bay of Bengal. Katō's death was a severe blow to the Imperial Japanese Army Air Force.

The Air Ministry's replacement for the Blenheim as a medium day bomber, another Bristol design, the Buckingham, was overtaken by events and changes in requirements, and considered inferior to the de Havilland Mosquito, and as such did not see combat. The final ground-attack version – the Blenheim Mk.V – first equipped 139 Squadron in June 1942. Eventually thirteen squadrons – mainly in the Middle East and Far East – received this variant but generally operated them only for a few months.

One Blenheim Mk.IV left in Java by the retreating British forces in 1942 ended up in the hands of the fledgling Indonesian Air Force (AURI). They repaired it, installed 950 hp (710 kW) Nakajima Sakae engines, painted it in their colours, and flew it around Yogyakarta on at least three occasions.

==== First attack on the Japanese carrier force ====
On 9 April 1942, nine Blenheims from 11 Squadron attacked the 1st Air Fleet (Kidō Butai) on their Indian Ocean raid; the Imperial Japanese main carrier battle group (Admiral Chūichi Nagumo). The Blenheims approached undetected by the A6M2 Zero combat air patrol (CAP) fighters and surprised the Japanese carrier battle group. While the bombers attacked fleet carrier Akagi from an altitude of 11,000 feet (3,400 m), they missed. Four of the Blenheims were shot down over the carriers by CAP Zeroes (two of which were claimed by ace-fighter pilot Kaname Harada from Soryu) and by other Japanese aircraft returning from the earlier attack on HMS Hermes, shooting down two Zeroes in return. This was the first time a Japanese carrier force had faced a concerted air attack in the Pacific War.

=== Finland ===
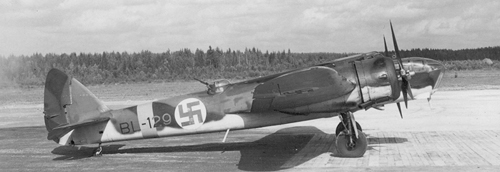
Blenheim BL-129 of Finnish Air Force LeLv 44

In 1936, the Finnish Air Force became the first export customer for the Blenheim, ordering 18 Blenheim Mk.Is, which were delivered from Britain between June 1937 and July 1938. Two years later, Finland obtained a manufacturing licence for the Blenheim. Before any aircraft could be manufactured at the Valtion lentokonetehdas (State Aeroplane Factory) in Finland, the Winter War broke out, forcing the Finns to order more aircraft from the UK. A further 24 British-manufactured Blenheims were ordered during the Winter War and were delivered from the RAF's own stocks.

In the aftermath of the Winter War, 55 Blenheims were constructed in Finland, the final aircraft being completed in September 1944; this brought the total number of Blenheims in Finnish service to 97 (75 Mk.Is and 22 Mk.IVs). The Finns also received 20 half-completed ex-Yugoslavian Mk.IV Blenheims captured by Germany, together with manufacturing tools, production equipment, and a huge variety of spare parts, although some of these had been damaged or otherwise destroyed through sabotage. Yugoslavia had ceased production of the Mk.I and commenced a production run of Mk.IVs just prior to the April 1941 invasion. The British-made Blenheims had RAF green interiors, RAF seat belts and instruments on imperial units, while Finnish-made Blenheims had medium grey interiors, Finnish-style seat belts and metric instruments.

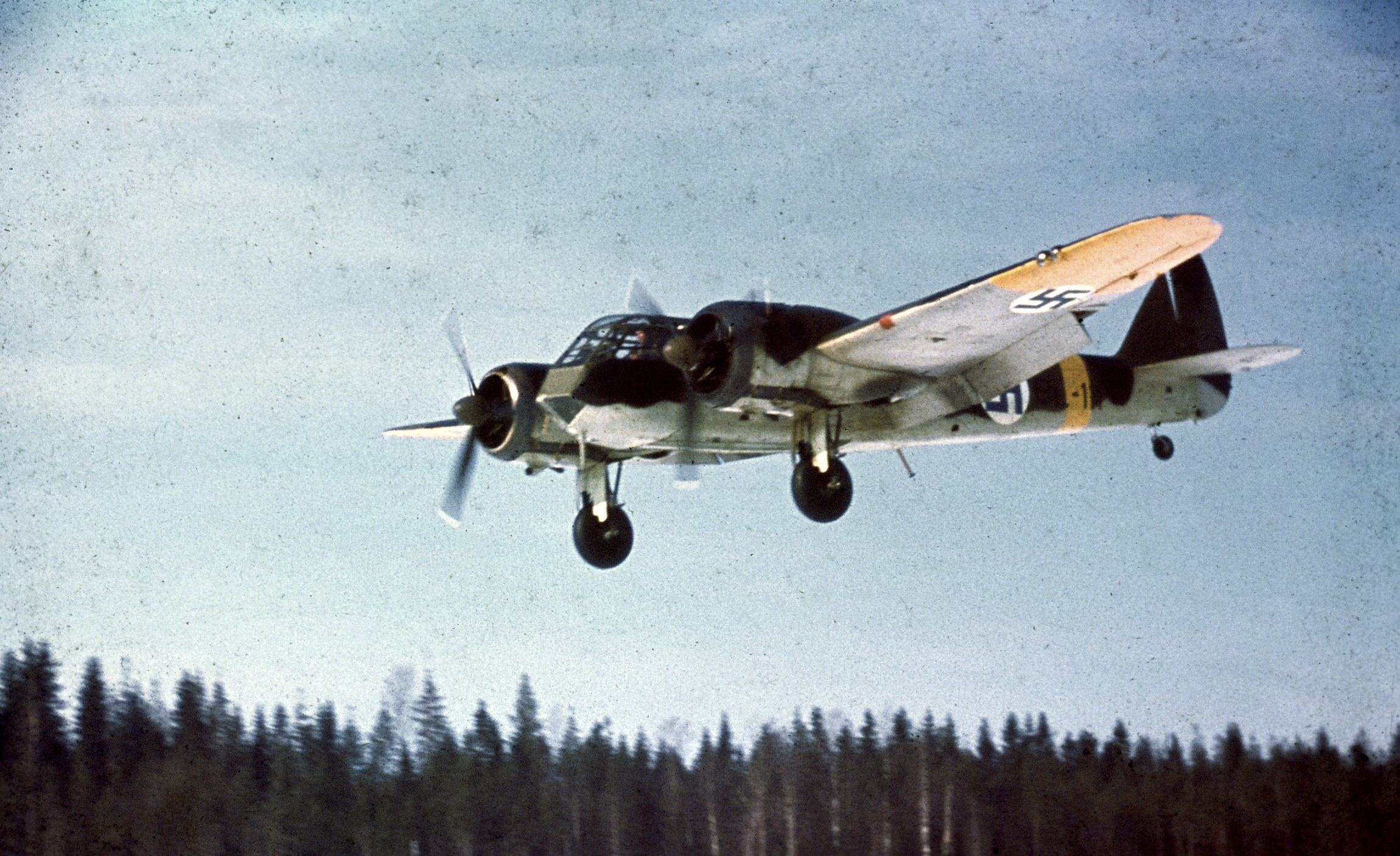
Blenheim I (BL-111) coming in for a landing on Luonetjärvi Airfield, March 1944. BL-111 was a Series I aircraft with doorless bomb bays.

The Finnish Blenheims flew 423 missions during the Winter War, and close to 3,000 missions during the Continuation War and Lapland War. Blenheim machine-gunners also shot down eight Soviet aircraft. Thirty-seven Blenheims were lost in combat during the wars. The Finnish Blenheims were divided on six series (sarja):

Series I (BL-104..BL-121): 18 British-made Blenheim I bombers with doorless bomb bays. Arrived in 1938
Series II (BL-146..BL-160): 15 Finnish-made Blenheim I bombers with deepened bomb bay doors. In service by 1941.
Series III (BL-122..BL-133): 12 British-made Blenheim IV bombers ("long-noses"). Arrived in January 1940.
Series IV (BL-134..BL-145): 12 British-made Blenheim I bombers. Arrived in February 1940.
Series V (BL-161..BL-190): 30 Finnish-made Blenheim I bombers. In service by 1943.
Series VI (BL-196..BL-205): 10 Finnish-made Blenheim IV bombers. In service by 1944.
Series VII (BL-191..BL-195): six Finnish-made Blenheim I bombers, was cancelled in 1944.

Series I with doorless bomb bays could carry a 1,800 lb (800 kg) bomb load in the bomb bay and up to 220 lb (100 kg) in wing cells. Series II, V and VI could carry a 1,800 lb (800 kg) load in the bomb bay and 379 lb (172 kg) in wing cells and fuselage racks. Series III and IV had the original RAF bomb bays and racks and could carry only 1,000 lb (450 kg) in the bomb bay and 200 lb (91 kg) in wing cells. The bomb bays, bomb bay doors and bomb racks of various series were modified in major overhauls to carry larger bombs.

After the war, Finland was prohibited from flying bomber aircraft by the Paris Peace Treaty, with Finland's Blenheims being placed into storage in 1948. However, in 1951, five Blenheims were re-activated for use as target tugs, with the last flight of a Finnish Blenheim taking place on 20 May 1958. The usual nickname of Blenheim in the Finnish Air Force was Pelti-Heikki ("Tin Henry").

== Variants ==
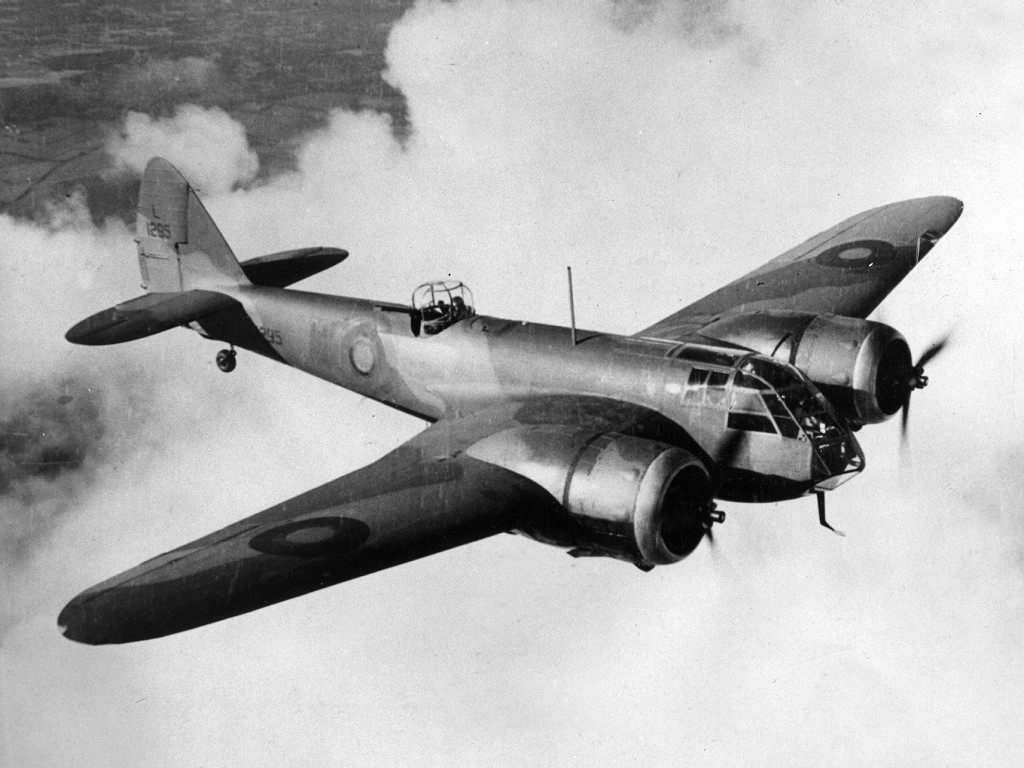
Bristol Blenheim Mk.I in flight

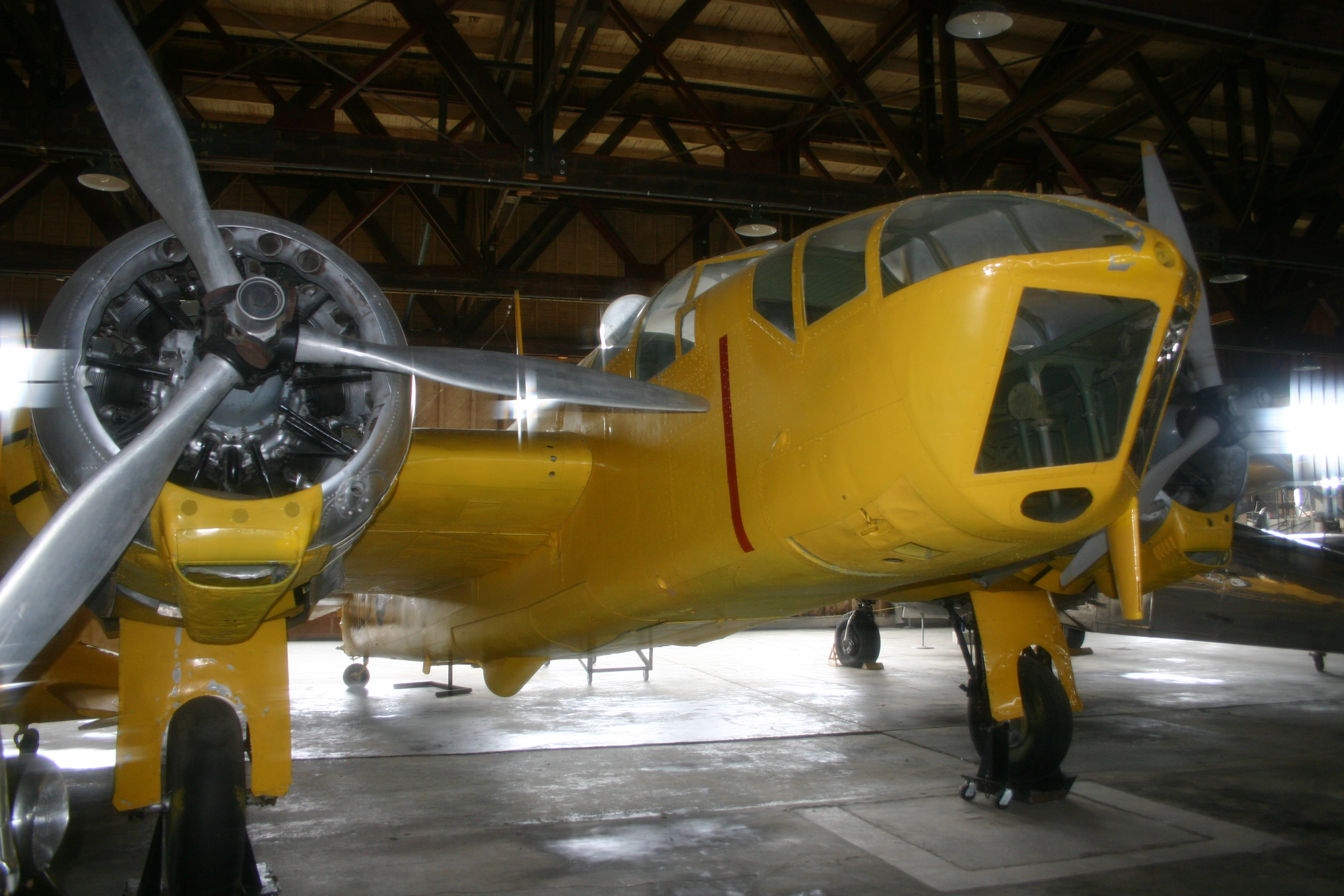
Bolingbroke IVT in the Commonwealth Air Training Plan Museum, Brandon, Manitoba

Blenheim Mk.I
Three-seat twin-engined light bomber, powered by two 840 hp (630 kW) Bristol Mercury VIII radial piston engines, armed with a 0.303 in (7.7 mm) machine gun in the port wing, plus a 0.303 in (7.7 mm) Vickers K gun in the dorsal turret, maximum bombload 1,000 lb (450 kg). 1,552 built. Company designation Type 142M.
Blenheim Mk.IF
Long-range heavy fighter version, armed with four 0.303 in (7.7 mm) machine guns in a special gun pack under the fuselage. About 200 Blenheim Mk.Is were converted into Mk.IF fighters, with a number of those converted to night fighters with the addition of AI Mk.III or Mk.IV airborne interceptor radar.
Blenheim Mk.II
Long-range reconnaissance version with extra fuel tankage. One built.
Blenheim Mk.III
Prototype for Mk.IV with lengthened nose.
Blenheim Mk.IV/Bolingbroke I
Improved version, fitted with protective armour and extended nose, powered by two 905 hp (675 kW) Bristol Mercury XV radial piston engines, armed with a 0.303 in (7.7 mm) machine gun in the port wing, plus two 0.303 in (7.7 mm) machine-guns in a powered operated dorsal turret, and two remotely controlled rearward-firing 0.303 in (7.7 mm) machine guns mounted beneath the nose, maximum bombload 1,000 lb (450 kg) internally and 320 lb (150 kg) externally. 3,307 built. Company designation Type 149
Blenheim Mk.IVF
Long-range fighter version, armed with four 0.303 in (7.7 mm) machine guns in special gun pack under the fuselage. About 60 Blenheim Mk.IVs were converted into Mk.IVF fighters.
Blenheim Mk.V/Bisley Mk.I
High-altitude bomber, powered by two Bristol Mercury XV or XXV radial piston engines. Company designation Type 160

== Operators ==
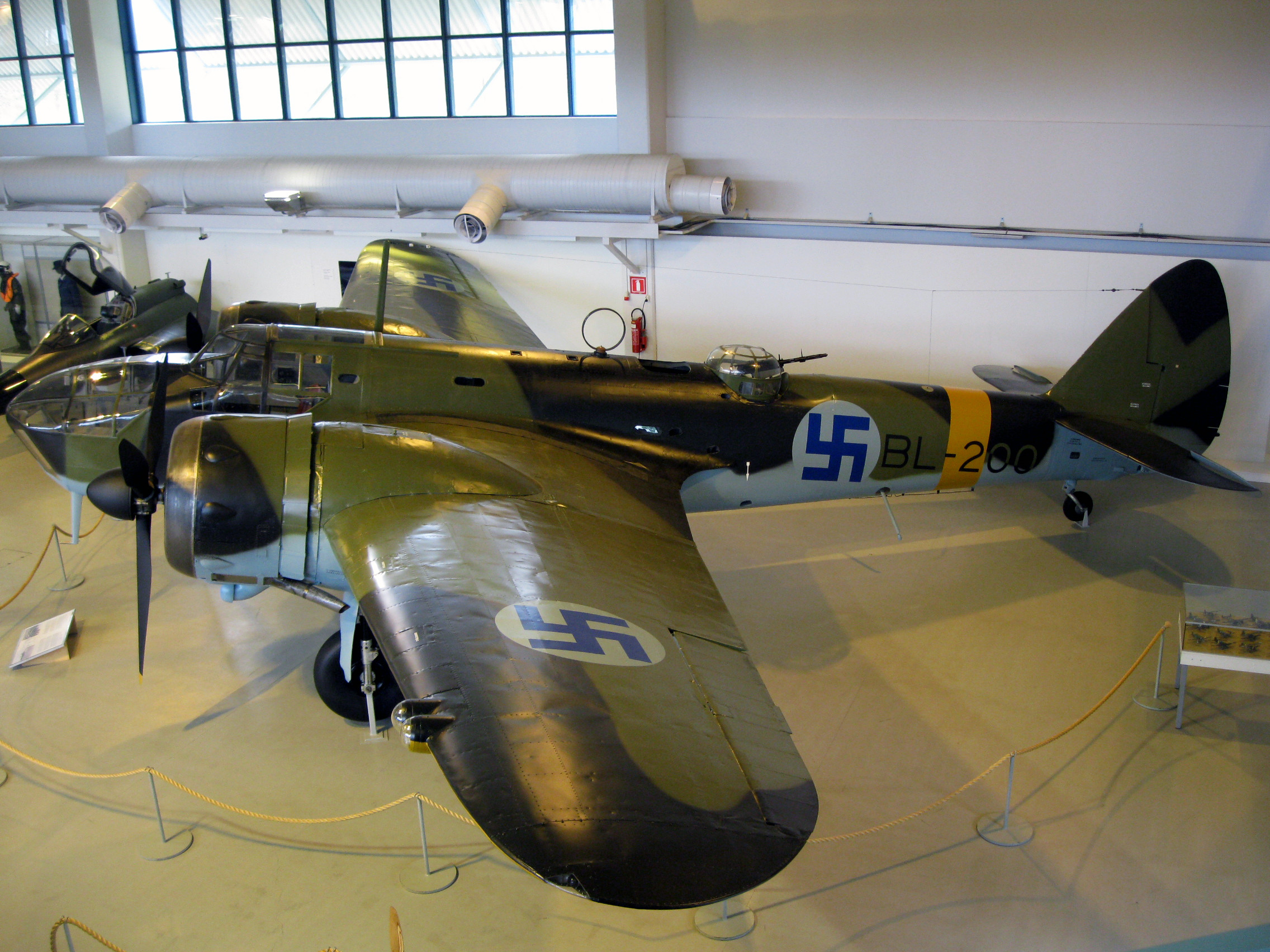
Blenheim IV BL-200 (with the Finnish Hakaristi markings) at the Aviation Museum of Central Finland

- Australia
- Canada
- Independent State of Croatia
- Finland
- France
- Greece
- India
- Indonesia
- New Zealand
- Poland
- Portugal
- Romania
- South Africa
- Turkey
- United Kingdom
- Yugoslavia

== Surviving aircraft ==
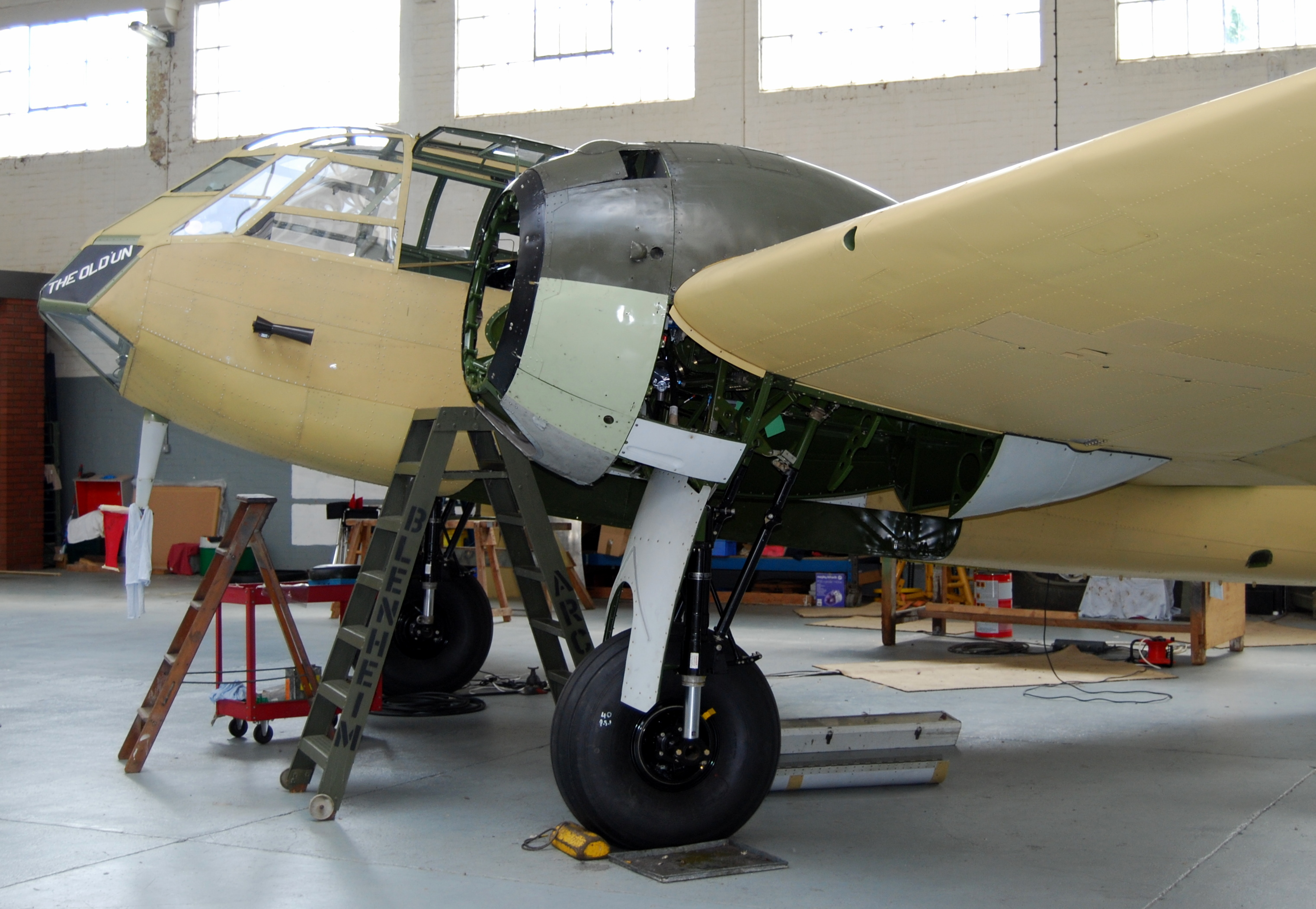
A Bristol Blenheim undergoing restoration at Imperial War Museum Duxford, 2012

In Finland, the sole surviving Blenheim (all other survivors are Bolingbrokes), a Mk.IV serialed BL-200 of the Finnish Air Force, is on display at the Aviation Museum of Central Finland at Tikkakoski.

An airworthy Blenheim was rebuilt from a scrapped Bolingbroke over a 12-year period, only to crash at an airshow at Denham within a month of completion in 1987.

A replacement Bolingbroke Mk.IVT was rebuilt to flying status over five years and painted to represent a Blenheim Mk.IV in wartime RAF service. It began flying in the UK in 1993, and was used in the 1995 film version of Shakespeare's Richard III. This aircraft crashed on landing at Duxford on 18 August 2003, but after extensive repair and conversion to the Mark I "Short nose" version, was displayed and flown again in 2014, at the Imperial War Museum Duxford, England. The aircraft appeared in the 2017 Christopher Nolan film Dunkirk.

In summer 1996, a Bristol Blenheim Mk.IVF was recovered from the sea, off Rethymnon, Crete. The No. 203 Squadron RAF aircraft was downed by friendly fire on 28 April 1941. The Blenheim was moved to the Hellenic Air Force Museum for restoration.

The Kent Battle of Britain Museum in Hawkinge began a project to rebuild a Blenheim IVF using the remains of four Bolingbrokes in 2018. The Aircraft Restoration Company (ARC) provided surplus parts from its own Blenheim restoration.

The Royal Museum of the Armed Forces and Military History in Brussels exhibits a Bolingbroke painted as a No. 139 Squadron RAF Blenheim XD-A that crash landed in May 1940 in Belgium.

== Specifications (Blenheim Mk.IV) ==
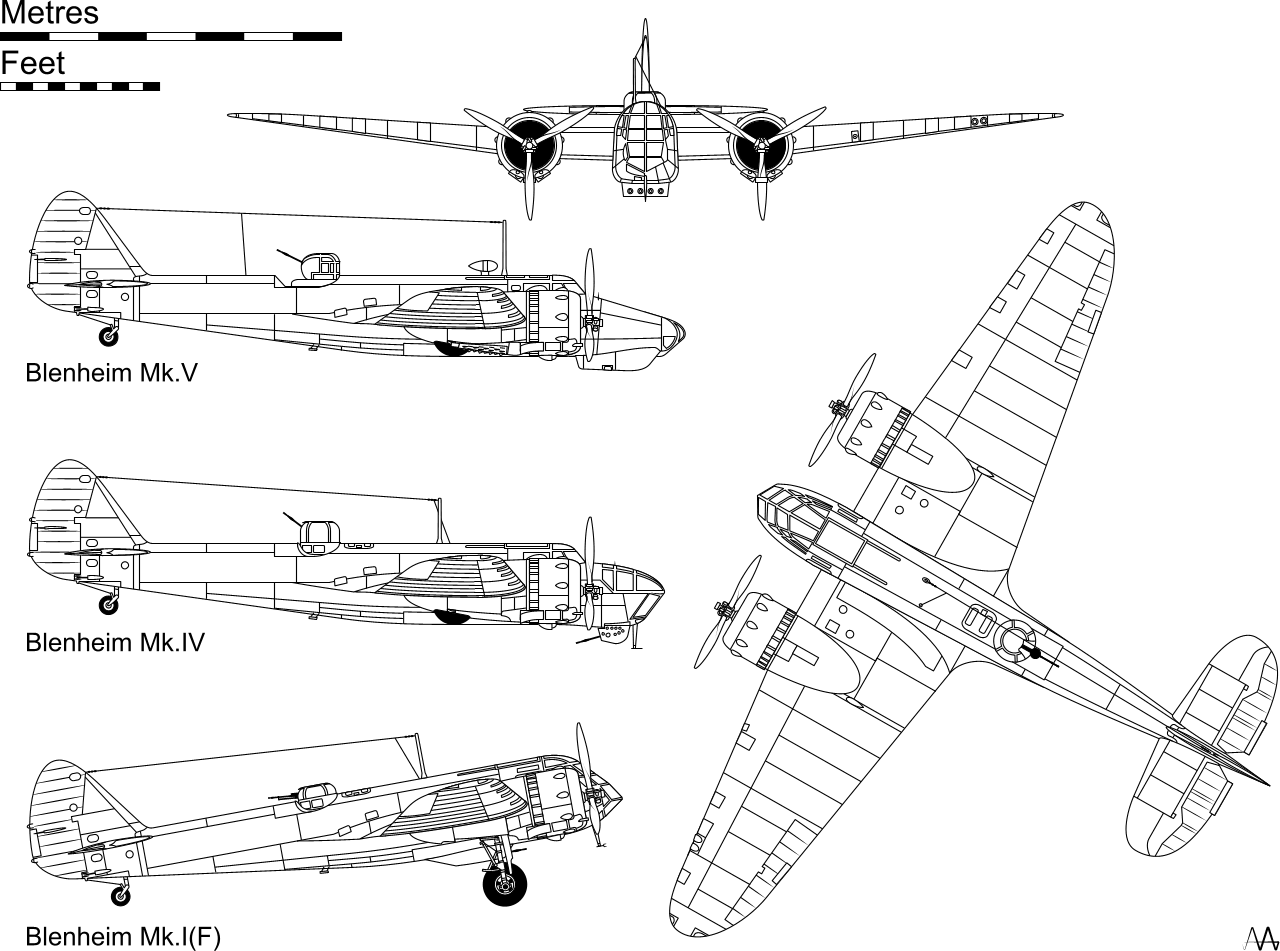
3-view drawing of the Blenheim Mk.I(F), with scrap views showing the Mk.IV and Mk.V variants

Data from British Warplanes of World War II, The Bristol Blenheim I

General characteristics

- Crew: 3
- Length: 42 ft 7 in (12.98 m)
- Wingspan: 56 ft 4 in (17.17 m)
- Height: 9 ft 10 in (3.00 m)
- Wing area: 469 sq ft (43.6 m^{2})
- Airfoil: RAF-28 (18%)
- Empty weight: 9,790 lb (4,441 kg)
- Gross weight: 14,400 lb (6,532 kg)
- Powerplant: 2 × Bristol Mercury XV 9-cylinder air-cooled radial piston engines, 920 hp (690 kW) each
- Propellers: 3-bladed Hamilton Standard variable-pitch propellers, built under license by de Havilland, 10 ft 6 in (3.20 m) diameter

Performance

- Maximum speed: 266 mph (428 km/h, 231 kn) at 11,800 ft (3,600 m)
- Cruise speed: 198 mph (319 km/h, 172 kn)
- Range: 1,460 mi (2,350 km, 1,270 nmi)
- Service ceiling: 27,260 ft (8,310 m)
- Time to altitude: 6,500 ft (2,000 m) in 4 minutes 10 seconds
- Wing loading: 30.7 lb/sq ft (150 kg/m^{2})
- Power/mass: 0.13 hp/lb (0.21 kW/kg)

Armament

- Guns:

- 1 × .303 in (7.7 mm) Browning machine gun in port wing
- 1 or 2 × .303 in (7.7 mm) Browning guns rear-firing in under-nose fairing or Nash & Thompson FN.54 turret
- 2 × .303 in (7.7 mm) Browning guns in dorsal turret

- Bombs:

- 1,200 lb (540 kg) total
- 4 × 250 lb (110 kg) General Purpose bombs or
- 2 × 500 lb (230 kg) GP bombs internally and 8 × 40 lb (18 kg) GP bombs externally

- Finnish Blenheim IV Series VIs carried a 1,800 lb (820 kg) load in the bomb bay and 379 lb (172 kg) on wing cells and fuselage racks.

Avionics

- T1082 (transmitter) and R1083 (receiver) radio sets

== See also ==
External videos
- Period news report on the Blenheim
- Footage and images of Blenheim operations
- Preserved Blenheim MK.IF taking off and performing multiple flypasts in 2015

Related development

- Bristol Beaufort
- Bristol Beaufighter
- Bristol Fairchild Bolingbroke

Aircraft of comparable role, configuration, and era

- Bloch MB.170
- Dornier Do 17
- Kawasaki Ki-48 Sokei
- Lockheed Hudson
- PZL.37 Łoś
- Tupolev SB

Related lists

- List of bomber aircraft
- List of aircraft of the United Kingdom in World War II
- List of aircraft of World War II
