= Alan Eckford =

British flying ace of the Second World War

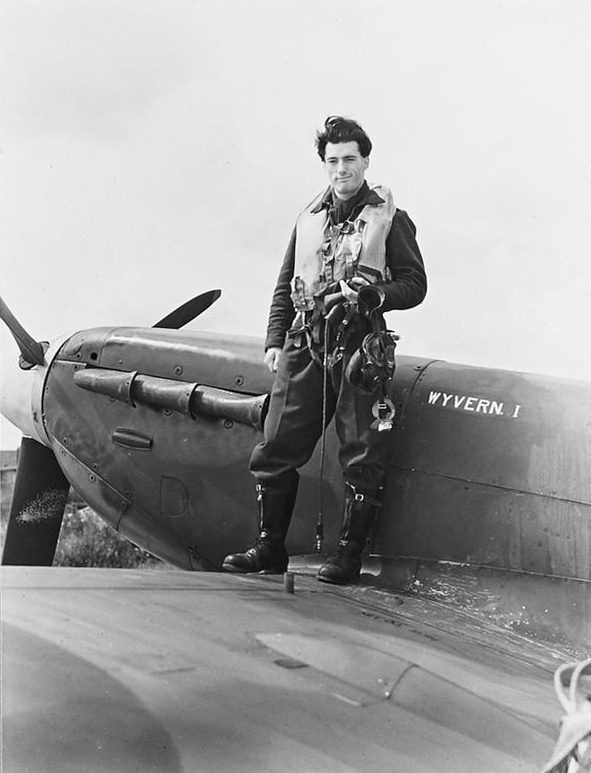
- Eckford and his Spitfire, 1942
- Born: 6 February 1919; Thame Park, Oxfordshire, England
- Died: 6 December 1990 (aged 71); Rickinghall, Suffolk, England
- Military career
- Allegiance: United Kingdom
- Branch: Royal Air Force
- Rank: Squadron Leader
- Units: No. 32 Squadron; No. 242 Squadron; No. 253 Squadron; No. 64 Squadron; No. 154 Squadron
- Commands: No. 242 Squadron
- Conflicts: Second World War: Battle of France; Battle of Britain; Circus offensive; North African campaign (WIA)
- Awards: Distinguished Flying Cross

Alan Francis Eckford DFC (6 February 1919 – 6 December 1990) was a British flying ace of the Royal Air Force (RAF) during the Second World War. He was credited with at least eight aerial victories.

Born in Thame Park, Eckford joined the RAF in late 1938. In the early stages of the Second World War he served with No. 32 Squadron, including a brief period in France in May 1940 following the German invasion of the Low Countries. During the later stages of the fighting there, he flew with No. 242 Squadron as a reinforcement pilot. During the subsequent Battle of Britain, he returned to No. 32 Squadron and was heavily engaged in the fighting over Kent during July and August, achieving several aerial victories. In the final weeks of the aerial fighting over Britain, he flew with No. 253 Squadron. He remained with the unit until late 1941, when he was rested from operational flying. After a period of instructing duties, he returned to active operations in mid-1942, serving with No. 154 Squadron during the Circus offensive, the Dieppe Raid, and in North Africa. He commanded No. 242 Squadron during the final stages of the North African campaign before returning to the United Kingdom. He served in the Air Ministry for the remainder of the war. He died in 1990, aged 71. A photograph taken of Eckford and other pilots of No. 32 Squadron during the Battle of Britain inspired the ‘Spirit of The Few’ Monument at Hawkinge.

== Early life ==
Alan Francis Eckford was born on 6 February 1919 in Thame Park, Oxfordshire, in England. He went to King Edward VI Grammar School in Birmingham before going on to Loughborough College on an engineering scholarship. Eckford joined the Royal Air Force (RAF) in November 1938 on a short service commission. Once his flight training was completed in September the following year, he was posted to No. 32 Squadron as a pilot officer. At the time, the squadron was based at Biggin Hill and operated Hawker Hurricane fighters.

== Second World War ==
Following the outbreak of the Second World War, No. 32 Squadron was scrambled several times to deal with incoming German aircraft, but were mostly unsuccessful. On 18 May 1940, the squadron was sent to France as reinforcements for the RAF fighter squadrons heavily engaged in the fighting there. It was based at Abbeville and was immediately thrown into action. Eckford destroyed a Messerschmitt Bf 109 fighter over Cambrai the day after arriving in France. When the RAF component in France was withdrawn a few days later, the squadron returned to Biggin Hill and was engaged in patrolling over Kent until the end of the month.

In early June Eckford was assigned as a reinforcement pilot for another Hurricane unit, No. 242 Squadron. On 8 June, it was sent to Châteaudun in France to provide cover for the British forces retreating to the Atlantic coast. It was heavily engaged and had suffered heavy casualties. Eckford flew several sorties before the squadron moved to Le Mans. Flying from an airfield there, he shot down a Bf 109 on 14 June in the Seine-Rouen region. Patrolling continued in the area around the western Bay of Biscay until 18 June, at which time No. 242 Squadron was withdrawn to England.

=== Battle of Britain ===
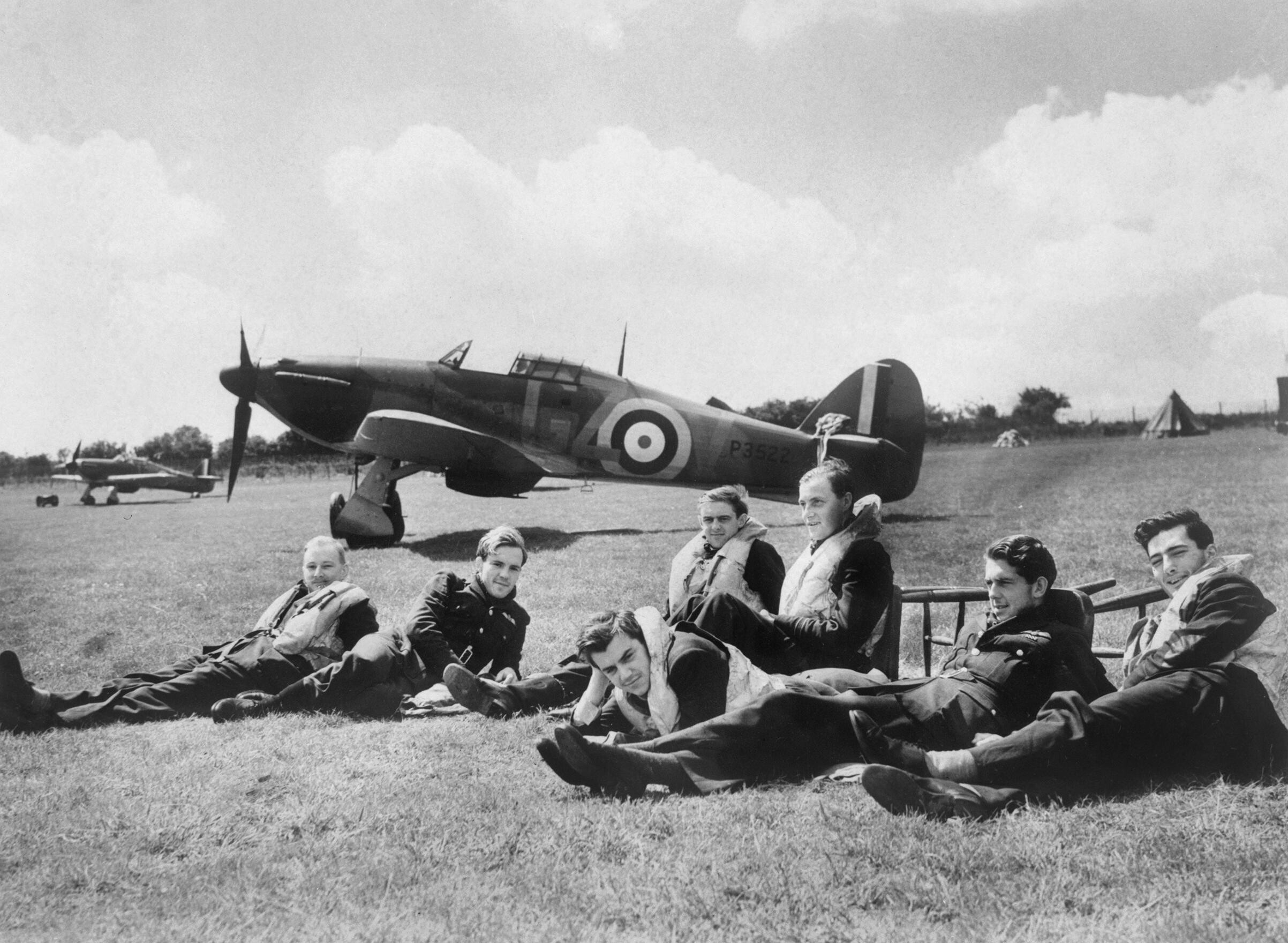
Pilots of 'B' Flight, No. 32 Squadron relax on the grass at Hawkinge in front of a Hawker Hurricane, with Eckford on the far right. This photograph is one of a series taken on 29 July 1940 which formed the inspiration for the 'Spirit of The Few' Monument, unveiled in 2022 at Hawkinge

Now under the command of Squadron Leader Douglas Bader and based at Coltishall, No. 242 Squadron was brought back up to strength and resumed operations on 9 July. Eckford intercepted and damaged a Heinkel He 111 medium bomber off Yarmouth the next day. He was posted back to No. 32 Squadron, flying from Biggin Hill, towards the end of the month. By this time, the Battle of Britain was well underway, and Eckford and the other pilots of the squadron flew several sorties daily to intercept incoming Luftwaffe bomber raids. On 18 August, what is now known as The Hardest Day, he destroyed a Junkers Ju 88 and a Dornier Do 17, both bombers and the latter attacking the airfield at Kenley, on separate sorties. He damaged a He 111 on 26 August.

Promoted to flying officer in early September, Eckford was transferred to No. 253 Squadron later that month. The squadron operated Hurricanes from Kenley and faced heavy attacks by the Luftwaffe. He destroyed a Messerschmitt Bf 110 heavy fighter over Maidstone on 27 September. Regular patrolling continued into October, including one at night over London, and he shot down a Bf 109 over Kent on the last day of the month.

Although the Battle of Britain was largely over by November, Eckford was still heavily engaged in patrols, shooting down a Bf 109 near Dungeness on 5 November. He shared in the destruction of a Do 17, and damaged another, on 22 November near Newhaven. The following day, while flying to the west of Cap Gris-Nez, he destroyed a Bf 109. On another sortie the same day, he claimed a second Bf 109 as probably destroyed.

No. 253 Squadron was briefly rested at the end of November but was brought back into service in early December, mainly on patrols with many being uneventful. Later in the month, Eckford's award of the Distinguished Flying Cross (DFC) was announced. The citation, published in The London Gazette, read:

This officer has displayed great keenness in his attacks against the enemy both in France and in England. His courage and skill, often in the face of odds, have enabled him to destroy six enemy aircraft.

— The London Gazette, No. 35022, 24 December 1940.

=== Circus offensive ===
In early 1941, No. 253 Squadron moved north and, operating from Skeabrae, carried out convoy patrols over the North Sea for the next several months. As well as these patrols, Eckford, now a flight commander, carried out several sorties at night. In November he was taken off operations and posted to No. 55 Operational Training Unit at Usworth in Sunderland.

Eckford, now holding the rank of flight lieutenant, returned to operations in May 1942 with No. 64 Squadron. His new unit operated Supermarine Spitfire fighters from Hornchurch on sweeps over France as part of the RAF's Circus offensive. He flew with the squadron for two months and was then transferred to No. 154 Squadron. This unit, another Spitfire squadron, was part of the Hornchurch fighter wing and at the time of Eckford's posting was engaged in sweeps to France and convoy patrols over shipping in the Thames Estuary. It participated in the Dieppe Raid as cover for the landings of 19 August, during which Eckford engaged and damaged two German aircraft, a Dornier Do 217 bomber and a Focke-Wulf Fw 190 fighter. On 27 August, while carrying out a search for a pilot downed in the English Channel, he encountered and probably destroyed a Fw 190 5 miles (8.0 km) south of Dover.

=== Subsequent war service ===
A month after the Dieppe Raid, No. 154 Squadron was transferred to North Africa, becoming operational from Djidjelli airfield, in Algeria, in November. From there it provided aerial support for the ground troops engaged in Operation Torch and also protected the shipping in Algiers harbour. On 12 November, Eckford combined with Group Captain Petrus Hugo to shoot down a Ju 88 in the area over Djidjelli. The following day, Eckford destroyed another Ju 88 in the same vicinity, having already been credited with a third-share in a second Ju 88 destroyed. His Spitfire was damaged in the engagement and he crash-landed without injury on the airfield. He was wounded in December during a Luftwaffe attack on Djidjelli airfield.

By early 1943, Eckford had recovered from his wounds and returned to operations, which by that time mainly involved patrols over Allied shipping in the area. In March, Eckford took command of his former unit, No. 242 Squadron, also based in Algeria and carrying out escort missions for heavy bombers. Once the North African campaign concluded in May, the squadron was moved to Malta to prepare for the forthcoming Allied invasion of Sicily. At this time Eckford was transferred back to the United Kingdom to take up a posting at the Air Ministry. He was promoted to squadron leader on 1 July 1944 but remained at the Air Ministry for the rest of the war.

Eckford was discharged from the RAF in February 1946. He is credited with eight or nine enemy aircraft destroyed, two or three probably destroyed, and five damaged. The uncertainty in the number of his aerial victories is due to the Bf 109 that was destroyed on 5 November 1940; in his logbook, this is described as being destroyed while in Fighter Command's 'Combats and Casualties', it is recorded as being probably destroyed.

== Later life ==
Little is known of Eckford's civilian life after his military service but in August 1978, he did meet one of the aircrew of the Do 17 he shot down on The Hardest Day, 38 years previously. He died at Rickinghall, in Suffolk, on 6 December 1990.

In September 2002 his medals which, in addition to the DFC, included the 1939-45 Star with Battle of Britain clasp, Air Crew Europe Star with France and Germany clasp, Africa Star with North Africa 1942-43 clasp, and the Defence and War Medals, came up for auction, fetching £15,000. The medals are presently owned by Lord Ashcroft.

Eckford is remembered in a memorial, the ‘Spirit of The Few’ Monument, unveiled on 29 July 2022 at Hawkinge airfield. He is represented as one of seven bronze sculptures of pilots of No. 32 Squadron, replicating a photograph taken of the men during the Battle of Britain.
