= Kent Battle of Britain Museum =

Aviation museum in Hawkinge, Kent, England

Coordinates: 51.1128°N 1.1525°E

The Kent Battle of Britain Museum is an aviation museum located in Hawkinge, Kent, focused on the Allied and Axis men of the Battle of Britain. The Spirit of the Few Monument is in the grounds of the museum.

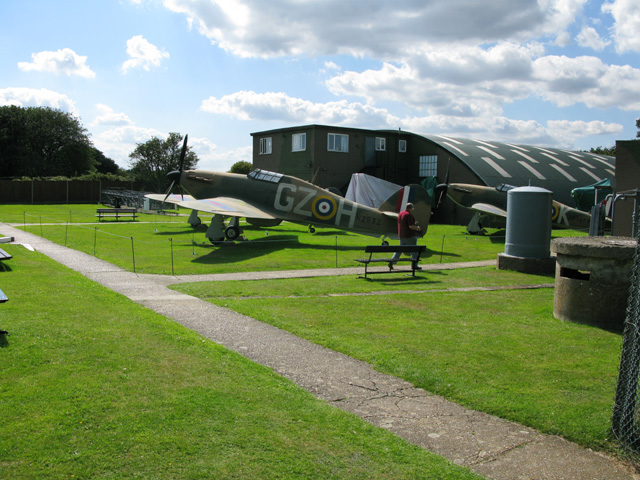
The Kent Battle of Britain Museum

== Collection ==
Exhibits:

- De Havilland Moth replica G-AAAH
- Fieseler Fi 103
- DFS Grunau Baby D-3-340
- Messerschmitt Bf 109 replica
- Supermarine Spitfire replica
- Boulton Paul Defiant replica L7005
- Hawker Hurricane replica N2532
- North American Harvard T2.B N7033
- Bristol Blenheim
- Fokker Dr.I replica
- Gotha G.IV replica
- Heinkel He 111
- Junkers Ju 52
