= Spirit of the Few Monument =

Battle of Britain memorial in Hawkinge, Kent

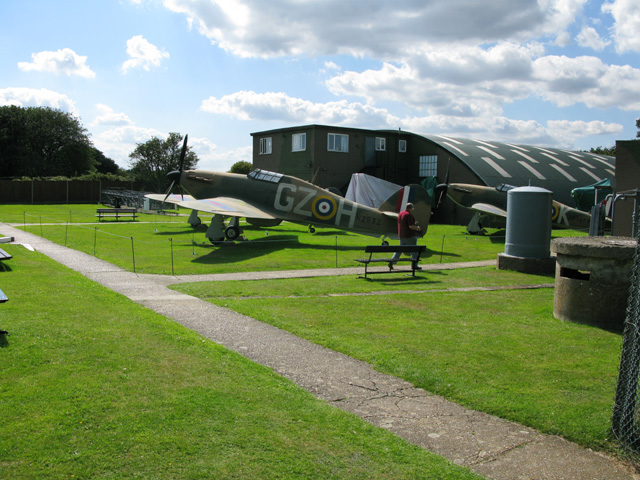
- The Kent Battle of Britain Museum, the site of the Spirit of the Few Monument
- Interactive map of Spirit of the Few Monument
- Location: Kent Battle of Britain Museum, RAF Hawkinge, United Kingdom
- Coordinates: 51°06′44.3″N 1°09′09.6″E
- Designer: Stephen Melton
- Type: Sculpture
- Material: Bronze
- Opening date: 29 July 2022
- Dedicated to: Aircrew of the Royal Air Force and Fleet Air Arm who flew in the Battle of Britain

The Spirit of the Few Monument is a memorial at the Kent Battle of Britain Museum at Hawkinge which commemorates the 2,938 aircrew of the Royal Air Force (RAF) and the Fleet Air Arm who took part in the Battle of Britain during the Second World War. The monument, unveiled on 29 July 2022, is in the form of bronze sculptures of seven pilots of the RAF. It replicates a well-known photograph taken on 29 July 1940 of pilots of No. 32 Squadron, which flew from Hawkinge airfield during the Battle of Britain.

== Design ==
The Spirit of the Few Monument was conceived in 1990 by Dave Brocklehurst, the chairman of the Kent Battle of Britain Museum at Hawkinge, which had been an airfield for the Royal Air Force (RAF) during the Battle of Britain in the summer of 1940. It was to commemorate The Few, the 2,938 aircrew of the RAF and the Fleet Air Arm who took part in the Battle of Britain. The inspiration for the monument was a photograph, taken at Hawkinge on 29 July 1940, of seven pilots of No. 32 Squadron relaxing on the grass in front of a Hawker Hurricane fighter in between sorties. The pilots in the photograph are Flying Officer Rupert Smythe, Flight Lieutenant John Proctor, Pilot Officer Keith Gillman, Flight Lieutenant Peter Brothers, Flight Lieutenant Peter Gardner, Flying Officer Douglas Grice and Flying Officer Alan Eckford, all but Gillman surviving the war.

Brocklehurst had long kept the concept for the monument to himself, but was motivated after an accident in May 2020 to bring it to fruition. After receiving favourable feedback on his concept from trustees of the museum, the art studio SPACER of Ramsgate was contracted to make the seven bronze statues, one for each of the pilots in the photograph. The expected cost of £150,000 was covered by the museum's fundraising efforts along with donations.

Each life-size statue was cast from a mould of a clay sculpture designed by Stephen Melton, work which took 14 months to complete. Brocklehurst estimated from shadows cast in the photograph that it was taken at around 12:30 in the afternoon; one of the pilots is sculpted with a wristwatch showing this time.

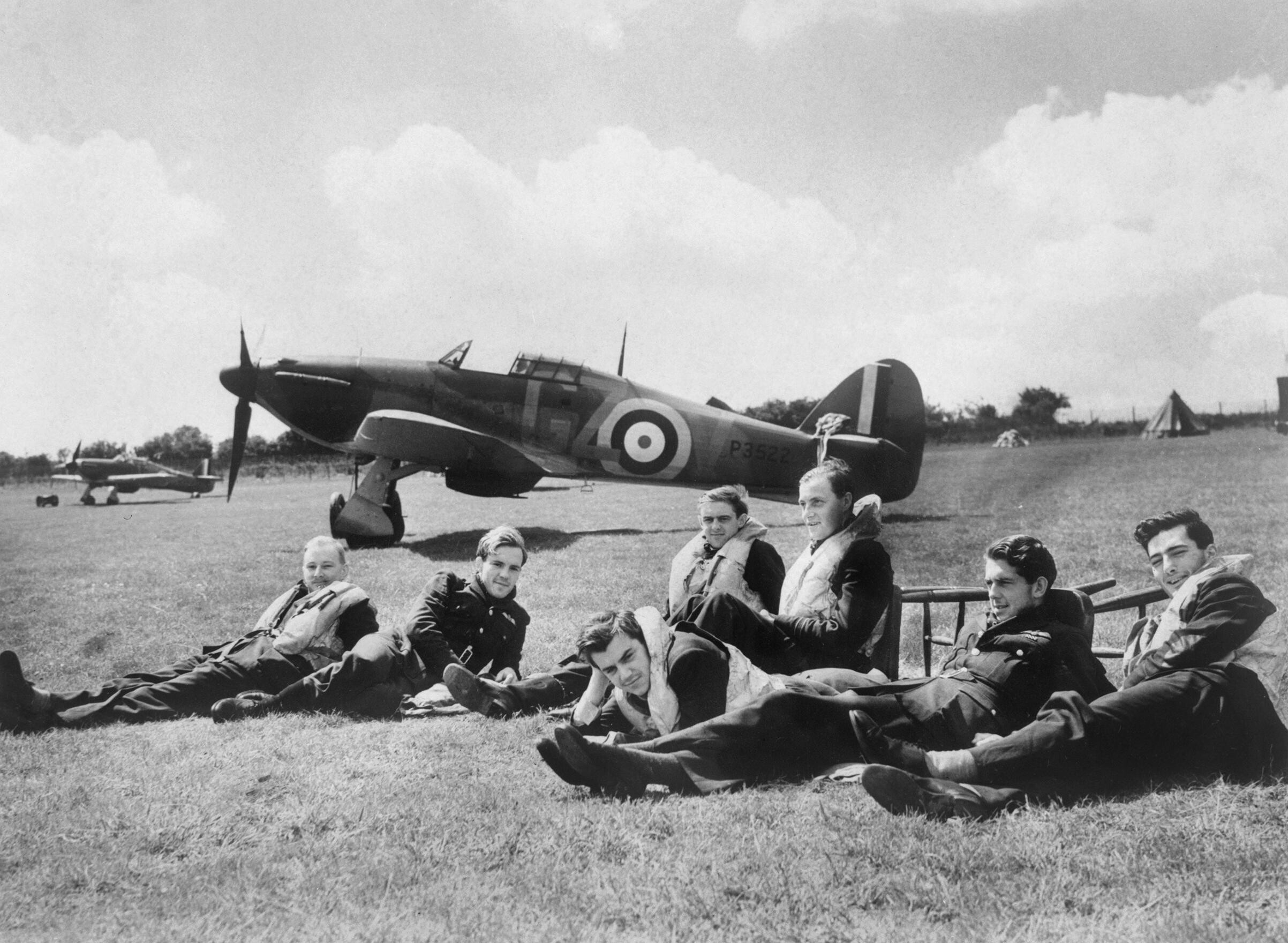
Pilots of 'B' Flight, No. 32 Squadron relax on the grass at Hawkinge in front of a Hawker Hurricane. This photograph is one of a series taken on 29 July 1940 which formed the inspiration for the 'Spirit of The Few' Monument, unveiled in 2022 at Hawkinge

== Unveiling ==
The unveiling of the monument, in the grounds of the Kent Battle of Britain Museum at the former grass airfield at Hawkinge, was held on 29 July 2022, on the 82nd anniversary of the taking of the photograph that inspired it. In attendance were a number of relatives of the seven pilots and a contingent of personnel from No. 32 Squadron. Actor David Jason was to be the guest of honour but was ill with COVID-19. Instead, Squadron Leader Woods of No. 32 Squadron, unveiled the monument. A flypast by four Hurricanes took place.
