= Petrus Hugo =

South African flying ace of the Second World War (1917–1986)

Petrus Hendrik Hugo
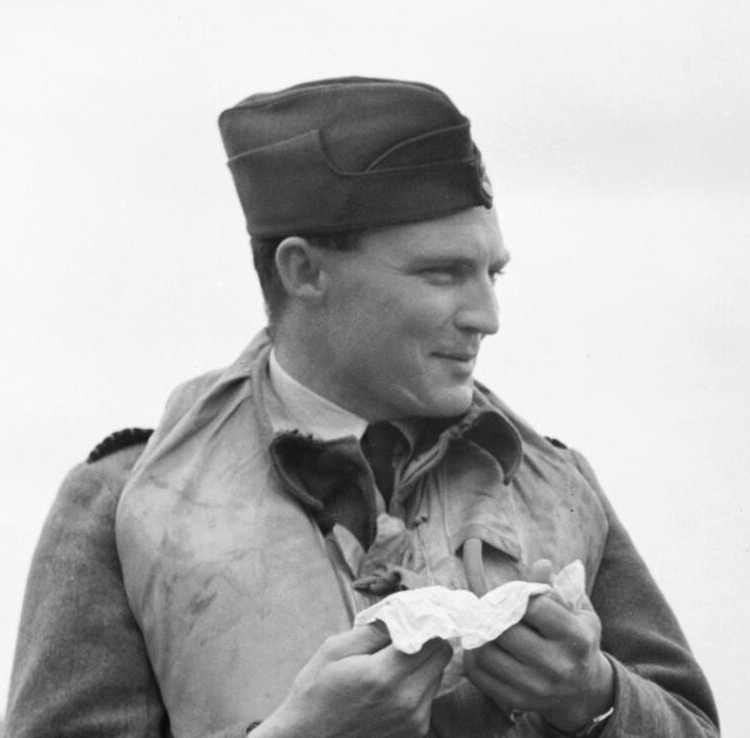
- Petrus Hugo c.1940s
- Born: 20 December 1917; Pampoenpoort, Victoria West, Union of South Africa
- Died: 6 June 1986 (aged 68); Victoria West, Cape, South Africa
- Burial place: On family farm near Victoria West
- Military career
- Allegiance: United Kingdom
- Branch: Royal Air Force
- Service years: 1939–1950
- Rank: Group Captain
- Nickname: "Dutch"
- Service number: 41848
- Commands: No. 322 Wing RAF (1942–44); No. 41 Squadron RAF (1941–42)
- Conflicts: Second World War: Battle of France; Battle of Britain; North African Campaign
- Awards: Distinguished Service Order; Distinguished Flying Cross & Two Bars; Distinguished Flying Cross (United States); Croix de guerre (France)

Petrus Hendrik Hugo, DSO, DFC & Two Bars (20 December 1917 – 6 June 1986) was a South African fighter pilot and flying ace in the Royal Air Force (RAF) during the Second World War.

== Early life ==
Petrus Hendrik Hugo was born 20 December 1917 on the farm Pampoenpoort in the Victoria West district, Cape Province. He attended the Witwatersrand College of Aeronautical Engineering and in 1938 he went to the United Kingdom to attend the Civil Flying School at Sywell.

== Military career ==
On 1 April 1939, Hugo was awarded a Short Service Commission in the Royal Air Force as an acting pilot officer on probation. His Afrikaner origins and pronounced accent soon earned him the nickname "Dutch", and he was known by this throughout his RAF career. He was regraded to a pilot officer on 21 October 1939.

He served at No.13 Flying Training School for six months and was assessed "exceptional" at the end of his course. He attended the Fighter School at RAF St. Athan in Wales, and in December 1939, joined No. 615 Squadron RAF at Vitry-en-Artois, in France, equipped with the Gloster Gladiator.

In May 1940, the squadron re-equipped with Hawker Hurricanes. During the Battle of France, Hugo shot down a Heinkel He 111 bomber on 20 May 1940. 615 Squadron returned to the UK and were stationed at RAF Croydon and RAF Kenley.

On 20 July 1940 Hugo shot down two Messerschmitt Bf 109 fighters and shot down yet another Bf 109 on 25 July. He then shared a Heinkel He 59 floatplane with another pilot on 27 July. On 12 August Hugo shot down another Bf 109. On 16 August he claimed a He 111 probably destroyed over Newhaven, but was himself hit by cannon shell splinters from a Messerschmitt Bf 110. Slightly wounded in both legs, Hugo returned to action two days later. He was "bounced" by Bf 109s of JG 3 and wounded in the left leg, left eye and right cheek and jaw. He managed to crash-land, and was taken to Orpington Hospital. On 23 August 1940, he was awarded the Distinguished Flying Cross (DFC) in recognition of the following: "During June and July, 1940, he destroyed five enemy aircraft". By late September he rejoined No. 615, based at Prestwick in Scotland. On 21 October 1940, he was promoted to flying officer.

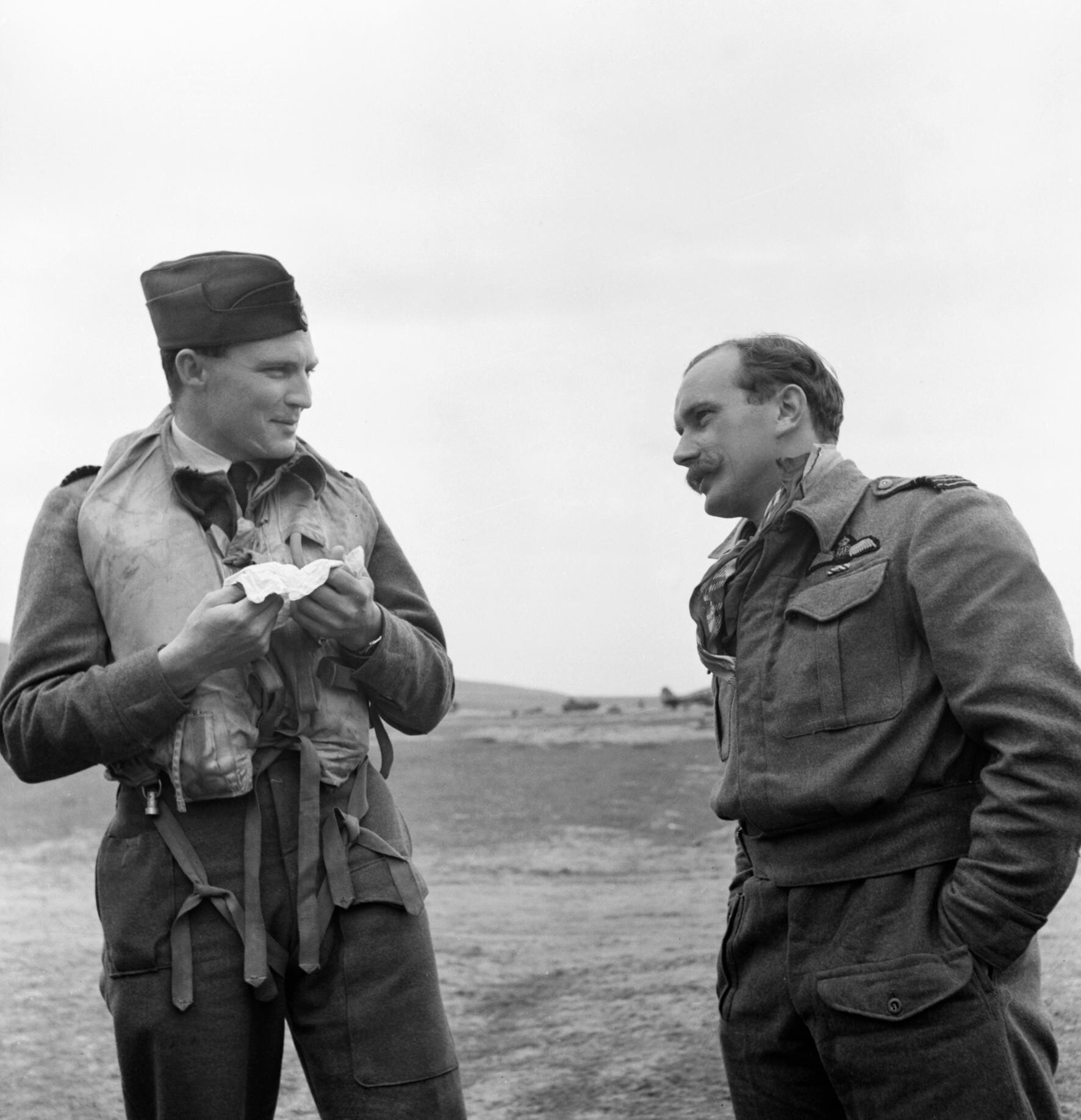
Hugo (left) with Ronald Berry

In mid 1941 the squadron, now flying the cannon-armed Hurricane IIc, returned to RAF Kenley. On 14 October 1941 Hugo shared a Heinkel He 59 flying boat shot down with three other pilots. On 21 October 1941, he was promoted to flight lieutenant (war substantive). He assumed command of 41 Squadron RAF on 20 November, which was flying Supermarine Spitfires, and was awarded a Bar to his DFC on 25 November. On 12 February 1942 during the channel dash of the German battleships Scharnhorst and Gneisenau, he shot down one Bf 109 and damaged a second. On 14 March he shot down another Bf 109 over a German convoy near Fecamp, and on 26 March he claimed another escorting Bostons raiding Le Havre. Promoted to wing commander on 12 April, he took over as Tangmere Wing Leader, but on 27 April was wounded again, being shot down in the English Channel. In a running fight with Focke-Wulf Fw 190s of II./JG 26, he claimed a probable Fw 190 and damaged a second but was hit in the left shoulder, and had to bail out, being picked up by Air Sea Rescue. He was awarded the Distinguished Service Order (DSO) while recuperating at 11 Group HQ.

In late November he took over No. 322 Wing RAF. On 12 November he combined with Flight Lieutenant Alan Eckford to destroy a Dornier Do 217 near Djidjelli. He claimed a probable Junkers Ju 88 and another damaged near Bougie Harbour on 13 November, and two days later a probable He 111 and a damaged Ju 88 over Bône Harbour. On 16 November he downed a Ju 88 and two Bf 109s. He got another Ju 88 on 18 November and three more Bf 109s on 21, 26 and 28 November. On 2 December he shot down two Italian Breda Ba 88 bombers of 30 gruppo near La Galite, one being shared, and on 14 a Savoia-Marchetti SM.79. He led 322 Wing for the next four months until posted to HQ, North-West African Coastal Air Force. On 16 February 1943, he was awarded a second Bar to the DFC for destroying at least 4 enemy aircraft in operations in North Africa.

He returned to command No. 322 Wing in June 1943 and on 29 June destroyed a Bf 109. On 2 September Hugo shot down a Fw 190 near Mount Etna and on 18 November he got his last confirmed victory of the war, an Arado Ar 196 floatplane of Seeaufkl. 126, over the Adriatic coast. His final tally was 17 destroyed, three shared destroyed, three probably destroyed and seven damaged. Of these, 12 and one shared destroyed were scored in the Spitfire V.

In November 1944, he was granted permission to wear the Distinguished Flying Cross he had been awarded by the President of the United States "in recognition of valuable services rendered in connection with the war".

After the end of the Second World War, he remained in the RAF with the rank of squadron leader; most officers dropped a rank or two from their wartime ranks. He attended staff college, and was posted to the Central Fighter Establishment. He retired from the RAF in February 1950, and was allowed to retain the rank of group captain.

== Later life and legacy ==
Petrus Hugo died in 1986. His medals were auctioned for £150,000 in 2010. Hugo Gardens in the London Borough of Havering is named after him.
