= Hawkinge =

Town in Kent, England

Coordinates: 51.117°N 1.1638°E

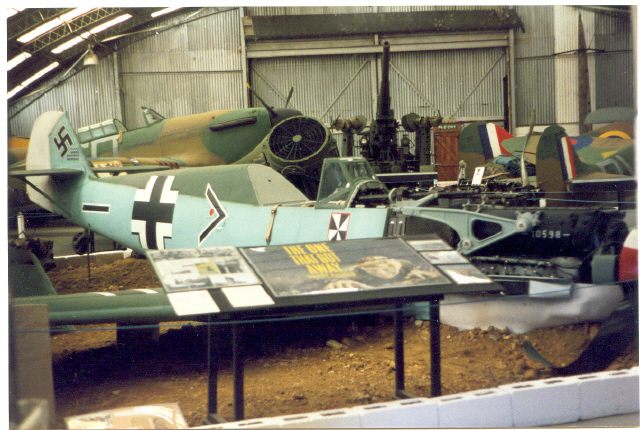
- The Kent Battle of Britain Museum in Hawkinge

- Location within Kent
- Population: 8,497 (2021)
- District: Folkestone and Hythe
- Shire county: Kent
- Region: South East
- Country: England
- Sovereign state: United Kingdom
- Post town: FOLKESTONE
- Postcode district: CT18
- Dialling code: 01303
- Police: Kent
- Fire: Kent
- Ambulance: South East Coast
- UK Parliament: Ashford

Hawkinge (/ˈhɔːkɪndʒ/ HAW-kinj) is a town and civil parish in the Folkestone and Hythe district of Kent, England. The original village of Hawkinge is actually just less than a mile (c. 1.3 km) due east of the present village centre; the village of Hawkinge was formed by the merging of Hawkinge and Uphill.

The name Hawkinge derives from the Old English hafocing meaning 'hawk place' or perhaps 'Hafoc's place'.

== World War II ==
During World War II, RAF Hawkinge was the closest operational airfield to France and was used during the Battle of Britain. Cicely McCall wrote about Hawkinge Women's Institute which had been reduced to just five members because of the effects of the war. The five remaining members had a canning machine and they made jam. They made 350kg of jam. During an air raid the married members went to the air raid shelter, but the unmarried member stayed behind to stir the jam.

The construction of the houses after the war was hampered by the discovery of several pipe bombs, put there in the event of a German invasion to render the airfield useless to enemy airplanes. There are several reminders of the war in and near the site of the original village; the Kent Battle of Britain Museum and various pillboxes are scattered amongst the farms.

Hawkinge Cemetery is near the site of the aerodrome and most of the 95 Second World War casualties buried there were airmen. About a quarter were killed during the Battle of Britain. Most of the war graves are in a special plot east of the chapel, including 59 German graves, which are together in a group at the south-eastern corner.

== Governance ==
Hawkinge is in the Ashford Westminster constituency.

On Kent County Council, Hawkinge forms part of the Elham Valley Division, represented by Cllr Christopher Hespe (Reform UK). On the Folkestone and Hythe District Council, Hawkinge is covered by the North Downs East ward, represented by Cllrs James Butcher, Stephen Scoffham (both Green Party of England and Wales) and David Godfrey (Conservative). Hawkinge Town Council consists of thirteen elected members; Eleven Conservatives, one UKIP and one Independents.

== Transport ==
The A260 which runs from Folkestone to Barham, where it meets with the A2 to Canterbury originally ran through the centre of the town, before it was replaced with a new bypass opened by Michael Howard on Monday 9 July 2007. The southern section, built in the early 2000s, leads from the A20 to a roundabout where it meets with the northern section. This new section carries traffic around the town centre onto the existing road.

Michael Howard opening the Hawkinge bypass

The bus services in Hawkinge are primarily provided by Stagecoach South East. Route 16 runs from Folkestone to Canterbury via Hawkinge, 7 days a week, and route 73 runs from Folkestone to Hawkinge on weekdays only. There are also special school time services that serve local schools in Folkestone, Dover and Saltwood run by Stagecoach South East and Crosskeys Travel.

== Amenities ==
There are two local churches. The Anglican parish church is St Luke's, the ancient parish church of St Michael's having been declared redundant in 1980; and the Baptist Church, having sold its small building, meets in a modern chapel on the first floor of Hawkinge Community Centre.

There are two primary schools: Hawkinge Primary School in the old village, and The Churchill Primary School.

The town publishes its own online newspaper, the Hawkinge Gazette.

The town also has its own local Scout group, 3rd Hawkinge.
