= František Fajtl =

Czech fighter pilot

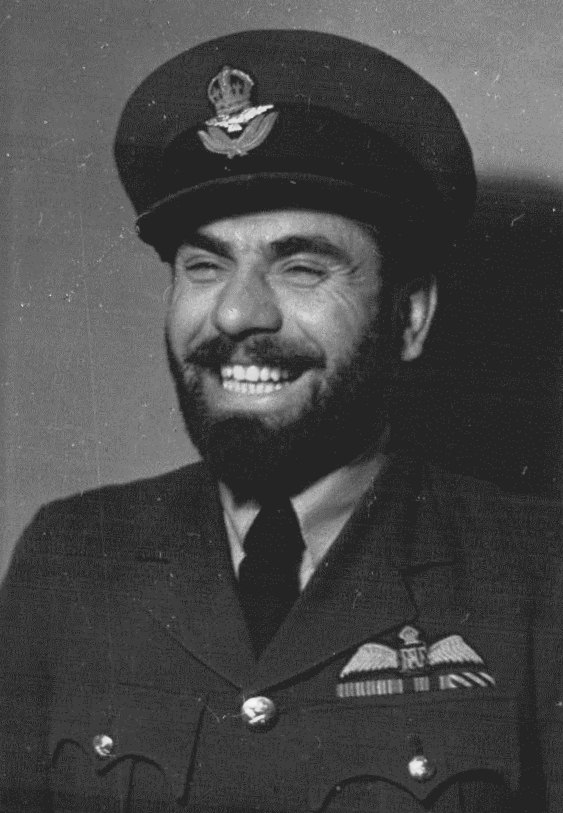
- Born: 20 August 1912; Donín, Austria-Hungary
- Died: 4 October 2006 (aged 94); Prague, Czech Republic
- Military career
- Allegiance: Czech Republic
- Branch: Czechoslovak Air Force; Armée de l'Air; Royal Air Force; Soviet Air Force
- Service years: 1935–1948
- Rank: Lieutenant General
- Commands: 1st Czechoslovak Independent Fighter Air Regiment
- Conflicts: World War II; Battle of France; Battle of Britain; Slovak National Uprising
- Awards: Order of The White Lion 3rd class military (Řád bílého lva, vojenská skupina, III. třída Czech Republic); Distinguished Flying Cross (United Kingdom); Grand-Croix of the French Légion d'Honneur (France); Order of The White Lion "For Victory" (Řád bílého lva "Za vítězství", Czechoslovakia); Czechoslovak Military Cross (Československý válečný kříž, Czechoslovakia) – 4x; Order of The Slovak National Uprising, 1st class (Řád Slovenského národního povstání 1. třídy, Czechoslovakia); Order of M.R.Štefánik (Czech and Slovak Federative Republic)
- Other work: Author

Lieutenant General František Fajtl (20 August 1912 – 4 October 2006) was a Czech fighter pilot of World War II. He was a British Royal Air Force (RAF) squadron and wing commander and led a group of Czechoslovak fighter pilots who formed an air regiment under Soviet Air Force command, supporting the Slovak National Uprising in 1944. He was dismissed from the Czechoslovak Air Force and was held in prison for a year and a half without a trial after the Communists came to power in 1948, and was only fully rehabilitated after the Velvet Revolution in 1989. He wrote many autobiographical books about his wartime experiences, and was an inspiration for the 2001 film Tmavomodrý svět (Dark Blue World).

== Early life ==
František Fajtl was born in Donín in northern Bohemia, which was part of the Austro-Hungarian Empire until after World War I, when it became Czechoslovakia in 1918, and now is a part of the Czech Republic. In 1933, he attended, and in 1935 graduated from, the Military Academy in Hranice as a Pilot Officer. He became Lieutenant Pilot in the Czechoslovak Air Force in 1935, flying observation biplanes, mostly Aero A.100 and Aero A.101 with No. 63 Squadron in the 2nd Air Regiment "Edvard Beneš", based at Olomouc and Přerov in Moravia.

== World War II ==
=== Escape to Poland and France (1939–1940) ===
After the Occupation of Czechoslovakia in 1939, in common with many Czech and Slovak soldiers, he fled through Poland to France. Fajtl joined the Armée de l'Air (French Air Force) ranked Sergent à titre étranger (Foreign Sergeant) and fought in two Groupes de chasse (fighter wings) near Lyon and Paris, flying Bloch MB-152 and Morane-Saulnier M.S.406 aircraft. After the Fall of France he escaped to North Africa through Port-Vendres, and travelled to Great Britain via Gibraltar, where he joined the Royal Air Force.

=== Battle of Britain and RAF assignment (1940–1942) ===
As a RAF Pilot Officer he took part in the Battle of Britain. He was a member of No. 1 Squadron at RAF Northolt and then No. 17 Squadron, flying Hawker Hurricanes. He transferred to No. 313 Squadron, which was formed at RAF Catterick in May 1941 from Czechoslovak pilots flying Spitfires. The squadron moved to Cornwall to escort bombers attacking north-west France, and later moved to RAF Hornchurch in December 1941, to conduct ground attack operations in the Pas de Calais. Despite some apprehension at foreign pilots flying in the RAF, his leadership was recognised, and he was promoted to squadron leader to command No. 122 Squadron in 1942.

=== Escape over Europe (1942) ===
On 5 May 1942 his Spitfire was shot down over northern France while escorting bombers attacking Lille, and crash-landed near Hazebrouck, within the heavily defended Atlantic Wall. He evaded capture and made his way through the occupied and "free" Vichy France, over the Pyrenees to Spain where he was captured and imprisoned in a concentration camp at Miranda de Ebro. As a result of British diplomatic intervention Fajtl was released after a few weeks and returned to his squadron in England via Gibraltar.

=== Wing commander (1942–1943) ===
After this episode he became a liaison officer. He was awarded the Distinguished Flying Cross in November 1942, and promoted to wing commander. He commanded the fighter station at RAF Skeabrae in the Orkney Islands, but dropped a rank to return to command No. 313 Squadron, flying Spitfires from RAF Ibsley.

=== Slovak National Uprising (1944) ===
In January 1944, František Fajtl was assigned to command a group of 20 Czechoslovak pilots, forming the 1st Czechoslovak Independent Fighter Air Regiment, in the Soviet Union as result of negotiations between the London-based Czechoslovak government-in-exile and the military mission in the Soviet Union. The air regiment was part of the 1st Czechoslovak Army corps, but was under the command of the Soviet Air Force. The government-in-exile's intentions were to support the rebellion in occupied Czechoslovakia, which later became known as the Slovak National Uprising launched on 29 August 1944 in Banská Bystrica.

On 17 September 1944 Fajtl landed with the regiment on Zolná airport near Zvolen from where, and also Tri Duby airport, they supported the rebellion with Lavochkin La-5FN fighters. The air group was a significant power, mostly due to their surprise effect. The Germans did not realize the presence of a fighter group based within the region. When the Slovak National Uprising was suppressed in October 1944, the air regiment returned to a Soviet-controlled airbase in Poland. His last military assignment was during the Ostrava Operation in 1945.

Shortly after World War II, František Fajtl was awarded many orders and medals and served as a lieutenant colonel in the Czechoslovak Army.

== Persecution (1948–1989) ==
Fajtl was treated as a hero on his return to Prague in 1945, but was dismissed from the Czechoslovak Air Force after the Communists' seizure of political power in February 1948. He was arrested by the Stalinist government in 1950, because of his connections to Britain. He spent 17 months in a labour camp at Mírov. For many years, he was forced to live outside Prague and was subject to many other restrictions. He was partially rehabilitated in 1968 during the Prague Spring, but was only restored to his rank after the Velvet Revolution in 1989.

== Rehabilitation (1989–2006) ==
František Fajtl became a chairman of the Czech Airmen Association and was promoted to lieutenant general, the second highest rank in the Czech Army. On 28 September 2004, he was awarded the highest order of the Czech Republic – the Order of the White Lion.

František Fajtl died on 4 October 2006 in Prague, survived by his wife Hana and two daughters.

== Publications ==
He wrote 14 mostly autobiographical books about his wartime experiences and also chronicles of the Czech soldiers fighting in foreign armies during the war and about his sad experience with communist persecution.

- Bitva o Británii ("Battle of Britain", 1991)
- Létal jsem s Třistatřináctkou ("I flew with the 313th", 1991)
- Sestřelen ("Shot down", 1991)
- Generál nebe ("General of the sky", 1992) memoirs of another fighter, František Peřina
- První doma ("Home for the first time")
- Opět doma ("Home again")
- Vzpomínky na padlé kamarády ("Memories of comrades killed in the war")
- Boje a návraty ("Fighting and coming home")
- Dva údery pod pás ("Two deep hits")
- Pouta nebes ("Shackles of heaven")

He was an inspiration for the 2001 film Tmavomodrý svět (Dark Blue World).

== Medals and honours ==
- Order of The White Lion 3rd class military (Řád bílého lva, vojenská skupina, III. třída Czech Republic)
- Distinguished Flying Cross (United Kingdom)
- Grand-Croix of the French Légion d'Honneur (France)
- Order of The White Lion "For Victory" (Řád bílého lva "Za vítězství", Czechoslovakia)
- Czechoslovak Military Cross (Československý válečný kříž, Czechoslovakia) – 4x
- Order of The Slovak National Uprising, 1st class (Řád Slovenského národního povstání 1. třídy, Czechoslovakia)
- Order of M.R.Štefánik (Czech and Slovak Federative Republic)

== Military units ==
Czechoslovak Air Force

- 2nd Air Regiment "Edvard Beneš" – before World War II

Armée De l´Air

- CIC Avord
- CIC No. 6 Chartres
- ELD Chartres (18 May 1940 – 27 May 1940)
- Groupe de Chasse III./9 (27 May 1940 – 6 June 1940)
- Groupe de Chasse III./7 (6 June 1940 – 17 June 1940)
- Groupe de Chasse I./6 (17 June 1940 – 20 June 1940)

Royal Air Force

- No. 310 (Czechoslovak) Squadron RAF (6 August 1940 – 17 August 1940)
- No.6 O.T.U. (17 August 1940 – 10 September 1940)
- No. 1 Squadron RAF (10 September 1940 – 25 September 1940)
- No. 17 Squadron RAF (25 September 1940 – 24 January 1941)
- No. 17 Squadron RAF (1 April 1941 – 27 May 1941)
- No. 313 (Czechoslovak) Squadron RAF (27 May 1941 – 27 April 1942), (Squadron Leader: 15 December 1941 – 27 April 1942)
- No. 122 Squadron RAF "Bombay" (Squadron Leader, 27 April 1942 – 5 May 1942)
- Czechoslovak Liaison Officer at No. 11 Group RAF (September 1942)
- Czechoslovak Liaison Officer at No. 10 Group RAF (2 October 1942 – 15 May 1943)
- Commander of RAF Church Stanton (until 28 June 1943)
- Commander of Skeabrae RAF Station (28 June 1943 – 22 September 1943)
- Commander of Ibsley RAF Station (22 September 1943 – 24 September 1943)
- No. 313 (Czechoslovak) Squadron RAF (Squadron Leader, 24 September 1943 – 31 January 1944)

Soviet Air Force

- 1st Czechoslovak Independent Fighter Air Regiment (Squadron Leader: 1 February 1944 – 22 May 1944)
- 128th Czechoslovak Independent Fighter Air Regiment (Squadron leader: 22 May 1944 – 15 June 1944)
- 1st Czechoslovak Independent Fighter Air Regiment "Zvolenský" (Squadron leader: 15 June 1944 – 14 May 1945)

== Aircraft ==
Aircraft used by country of origin.

Czechoslovakia

- Aero A.100
- Aero A.101

France

- Morane Saulnier M.S.406C.1
- Marcel Bloch M.B.151C.1
- Marcel Bloch M.B.152C.1

United Kingdom

- Hawker Hurricane Mk.I (P3788, YB-X; V6553, YB-J; P3894, YB-V)
- Hawker Hurricane Mk.IIA
- Supermarine Spitfire Mk.VB (BM210, MT-F; MB117, RY-A; MB127, RY-F)

Soviet Union

- Lavochkin La-5FN-UTI
- Lavochkin La-5FN
- Lavochkin La-7
