= Herbert Hallowes =

British flying ace of WWII

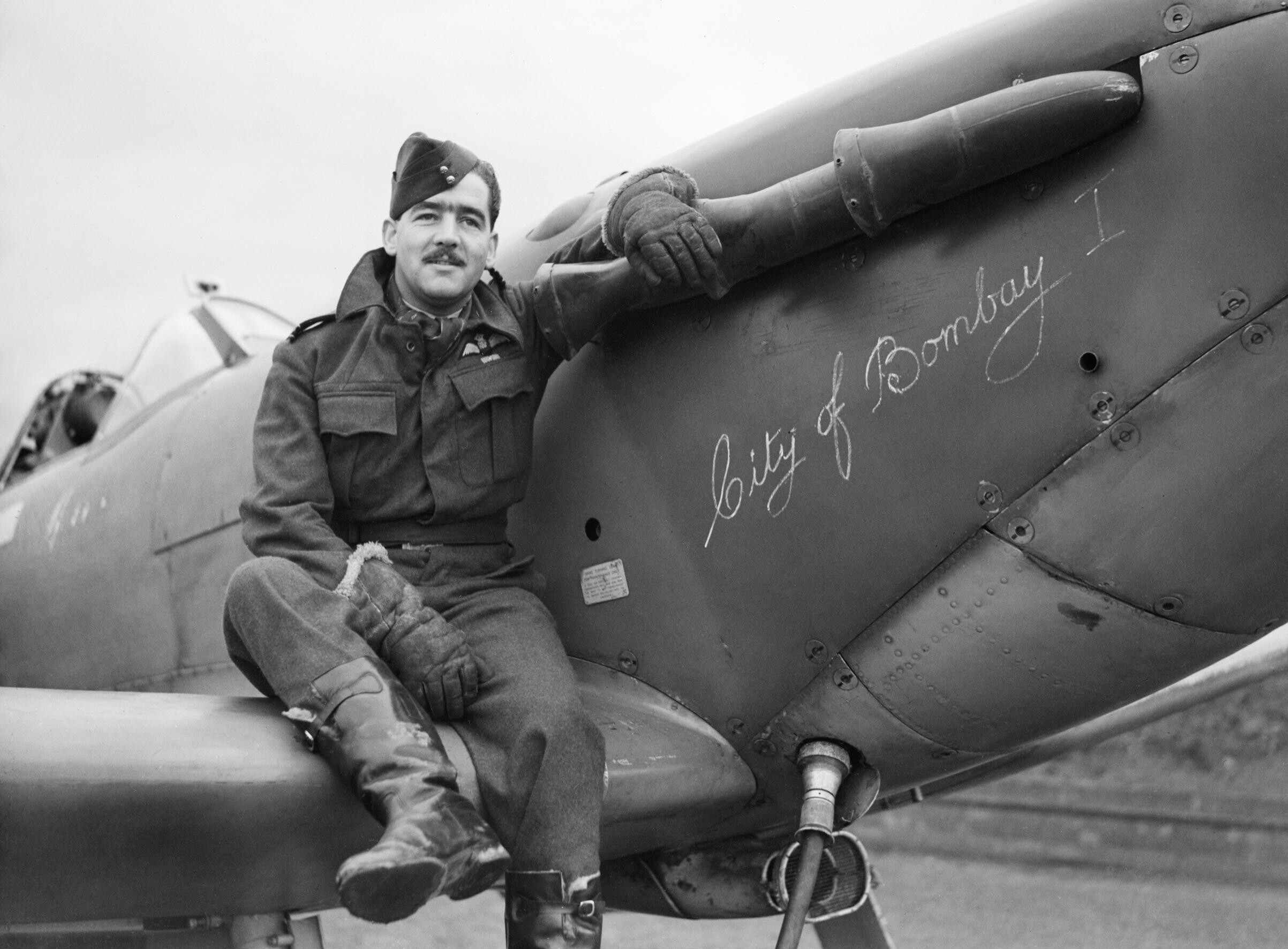
- Hallowes with a Supermarine Spitfire fighter of No. 122 Squadron
- Born: 17 April 1912; Lambeth, London, United Kingdom
- Died: 20 October 1987 (aged 75); Tenerife, Canary Islands
- Burial place: St Andrew's Church, Tangmere, United Kingdom
- Military career
- Allegiance: United Kingdom
- Branch: Royal Air Force
- Service years: 1929–1956
- Rank: Wing commander
- Nickname: 'Darkie'
- Commands: RAF Dunsfold; No. 504 Squadron; No. 165 Squadron; No. 222 Squadron
- Conflicts: Second World War: Operation Dynamo; Battle of Britain; Circus offensive; Dieppe Raid
- Awards: Distinguished Flying Cross; Distinguished Flying Medal & Bar

Herbert Hallowes, DFC, DFM & Bar (17 April 1912 – 20 October 1987) was a British flying ace who served with the Royal Air Force (RAF) during the Second World War. He was credited with having shot down at least nineteen aircraft.

Born in Lambeth, Hallowes joined the RAF in 1929 as an aircraft tradesman. Qualifying as a metal rigger three years later, he subsequently trained as a sergeant pilot and was posted to No. 43 Squadron. He achieved several aerial victories while the squadron operated over the evacuation beaches at Dunkirk during Operation Dynamo and in the subsequent Battle of Britain, for which he was awarded the Distinguished Flying Medal and Bar. Afterwards he was commissioned as an officer. He spent most of 1941 as an instructor and but flew operationally the following year as a commander of a fighter squadron, leading No. 165 Squadron during the Dieppe Raid. He was later commander of the RAF station at Dunsfold. He remained in the RAF in the postwar period, serving in its Secretarial Branch before retiring from the military in 1956. He died in 1987, aged 75.

== Early life ==
Herbert James Lempriere Hallowes, the son of a medical official, was born on 17 April 1912 in Lambeth, London, in the United Kingdom. For a time during Hallowes' childhood, his family lived in the Falkland Islands where his father was stationed. He went to school at Stratford-upon-Avon, being educated at King Edward VI Grammar School. Once his education was completed, in 1929 he joined the Royal Air Force (RAF) as an apprentice tradesman. He qualified as a metal rigger two years later.

In 1934, Hallowes, who was nicknamed 'Darkie', volunteered to train as a pilot and was awarded his wings in August 1936 as a sergeant pilot. He was posted to No. 43 Squadron. His unit, based at Tangmere station, was the first in the RAF to operate the Hawker Fury fighter. These were replaced by Hawker Hurricane fighters beginning in November 1938.

== Second World War ==
Following the outbreak of the Second World War, No. 43 Squadron moved to Acklington near Newcastle from where it carried out patrols over shipping convoys. On 3 February 1940, Hallowes piloted one of three No. 43 Squadron Hurricanes that shot down a Luftwaffe Heinkel He 111 medium bomber of Kampfgeschwader 26 (Bomber Wing 26) at Whitby. This was the first German aircraft to fall on English soil during the Second World War. The formation was led by Flight Lieutenant Peter Townsend. The squadron then moved north to Wick in Scotland to form part of the aerial defences for the Royal Navy base at Scapa Flow. On 8 April, he shot down another He 111 of KG26, the aircraft crash-landing onto the airfield at Wick with the pilot, believing he was landing on the sea, attempting to take to an inflatable dinghy only to be surprised by the appearance of a guard.

=== Operation Dynamo ===
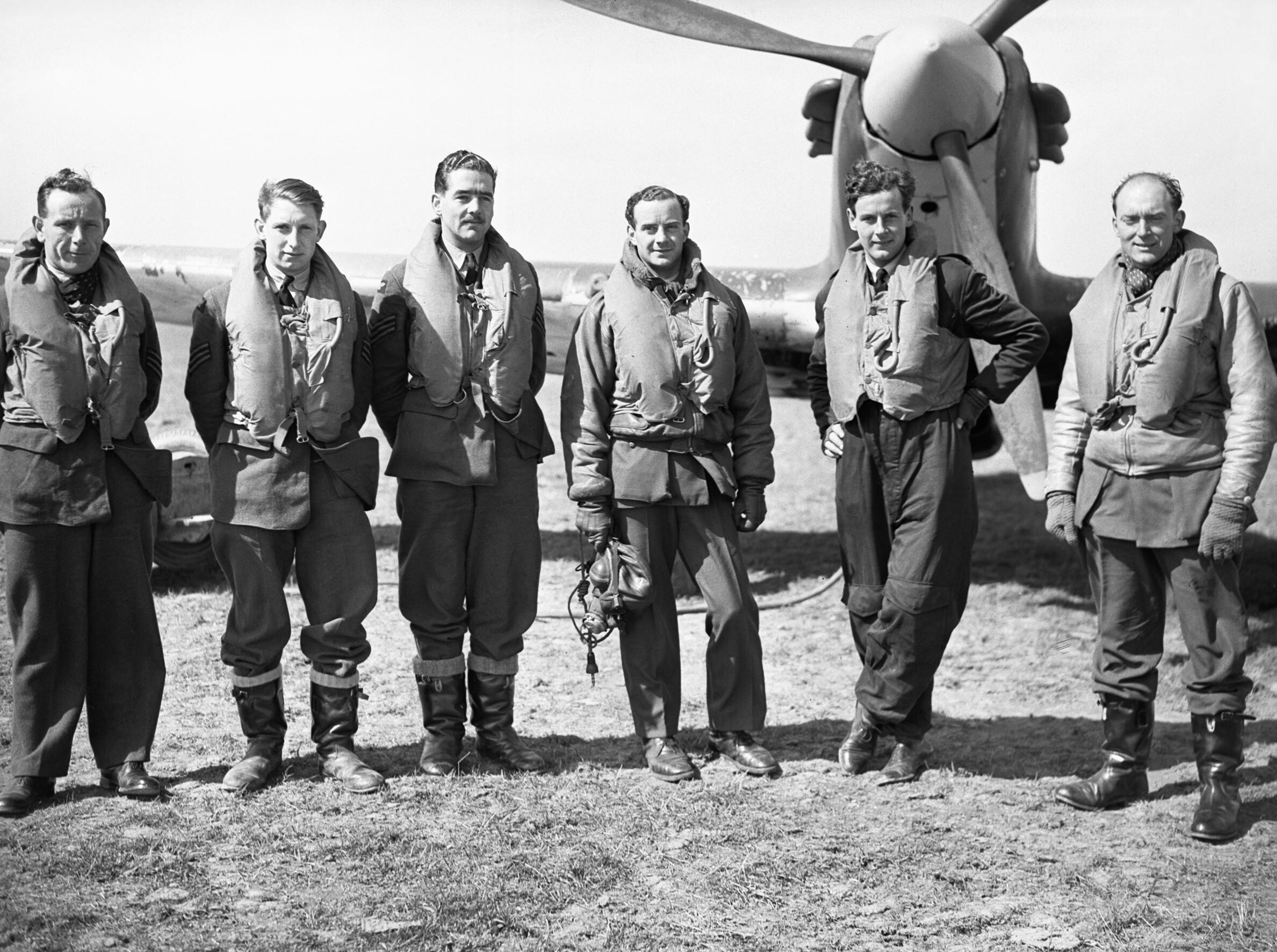
Hallowes stands third left in this group of No. 43 Squadron pilots at Wick, April 1940

On 1 June the squadron returned to Tangmere and immediately began operating over France, helping cover the beaches at Dunkirk during Operation Dynamo, the evacuation of the British Expeditionary Force from France. The same day, Hallowes destroyed a pair of Messerschmitt Bf 109 fighters and damaged a third, and also shot down a Messerschmitt Bf 110 heavy fighter, all about 5 kilometres (3.1 mi) north of Dunkirk. He destroyed a Bf 109 on 7 June near Le Touquet; he had been attacked by the fighter and his Hurricane set alight but before bailing out, he was able to fire upon the Bf 109 as it flew past him. On landing, he dislocated his ankle. He was collected by British soldiers who had seen the destruction of the Bf 109 and taken to hospital at La Bause. He duly returned to the squadron.

=== Battle of Britain ===
Due to its losses during the operations over France, No. 43 Squadron was briefly rested. It returned to duty with a move to Northolt in July, escorting Bristol Blenheim light bombers to targets in France and being involved in interceptions of incoming Luftwaffe aircraft over the English Channel. On 8 August, Hallowes shot down two Bf 109s 64 kilometres (40 mi) to the south of Swanage. These were followed on 13 August with a Junkers Ju 88 medium bomber probably destroyed near Littlehampton while another of the same type was shot down to the northwest of the Isle of Wight. He damaged a third Ju 88 and also destroyed a Dornier Do 17 medium bomber in the same vicinity. He claimed the probable destruction of a Ju 88 near Portsmouth two days later. The next day he shot down three Junkers Ju 87 dive bombers 8 kilometres (5.0 mi) from Selsey Bill.

On 18 August, now known as The Hardest Day, Hallowes repeated the feat by destroying three more Ju 87s, this time to the east of Thorney Island. These were part of Sturzkampfgeschwader 77 (Dive Bomber Wing 77) and tasked with attacking the airfield at Thorney Island. No. 43 Squadron had been scrambled to intercept and on engaging the Ju 87s, Hallowes fired at a line of five aircraft, seeing the crews of two of them bail out. The third Ju 87 that he destroyed had already dropped its bombs when Hallowes engaged it; he observed the tail structure break away during his attack and the Ju 87 crashed into the sea.

On 26 August, one He 111 was destroyed by Hallowes over Portsmouth, and he also shared in the destruction of another in the same area, his final aerial victories during the fighting over England. The following month, he was awarded the Distinguished Flying Medal (DFM) and a Bar to same, the announcement for both being made at the same time. The citation for the DFM, which was in recognition of his exploit of 7 June, was published in The London Gazette and read:

In June, 1940, Sergeant Hallowes was attacking an enemy aircraft over Northern France, when he was himself attacked. His engine being disabled, he proceeded to glide back to friendly territory but was again attacked when about to abandon his aircraft by parachute. He dropped back into his seat and as the enemy aircraft passed he delivered such an effective burst of fire as to destroy his opponent. He then made a successful parachute landing.

— London Gazette, No. 34940, 6 September 1940

The citation for the Bar to his DFM recognised his aerial successes to date and read:

Since the commencement of hostilities this airman has personally destroyed twenty-one enemy aircraft. He has set a fine example of bravery and resolute bearing on many occasions.

— London Gazette, No. 34940, 6 September 1940

Shortly after the announcement of Hallowes' awards, No. 43 Squadron was taken off operations and transferred to Usworth, in the north of England. Later in the month, he was commissioned as a pilot officer. In December Hallowes was briefly assigned to the newly formed No. 96 Squadron during its initial working up as a night fighter unit at Cranage. He returned to No. 43 Squadron at the end of the month.

=== Circus offensive ===
Hallowes was rested from operational flying for much of 1941 and during this time instructed at No. 56 Operational Training Unit (OTU) at Sutton Bridge. He was promoted to flying officer in August and in early 1942, returned to duty with a promotion to acting flight lieutenant and appointment as commander of a flight of No. 122 Squadron. This unit, tasked with the aerial defence of Edinburgh and the Firth of Forth, was based at Scorton and equipped with Supermarine Spitfire fighters. In April, it moved south to Hornchurch to take part in the RAF's fighter sweeps to France and the Low Countries. On 5 May, Hallowes damaged one Focke-Wulf Fw 190 fighter and claimed another as probably destroyed near Lille. He damaged another Fw 190 8 kilometres (5.0 mi) south of Gravesend four days later. On 17 May, he probably destroyed a Fw 190 and damaged two more, all near Saint-Omer.

In June, Hallowes was promoted to acting squadron leader and appointed commander of No. 222 Squadron. At the time, the squadron, which used Spitfire Mk VBs, was based at North Weald. As with his previous squadron, Hallowes' command was involved in sweeps to France. His tenure at the squadron was relatively short, for on 13 August he went to Ayr to take command of No. 165 Squadron. His unit, which operated Spitfire VBs, then flew south to Eastchurch on 14 August in anticipation of its involvement in 'Operation Jubilee', the amphibious attack mounted on Dieppe.

On the morning of 19 August, the day of the landings at Dieppe, No. 165 Squadron patrolled over the port city but did not encounter the Luftwaffe before returning to Eastchurch. Back over the French coast in the late morning, it helped cover the ships off the landing beaches at Dieppe, protecting them from the Luftwaffe bombers. A number of Dornier Do 217 medium bombers were engaged, Hallowes shooting down one and damaging a second. The squadron flew again in the late afternoon as cover for a convoy returning to England from Dieppe but this time saw no action. After the action at Dieppe, Hallowes' flight lieutenant rank was made substantive, while the squadron moved to Gravesend from where it carried out sweeps and escort duties.

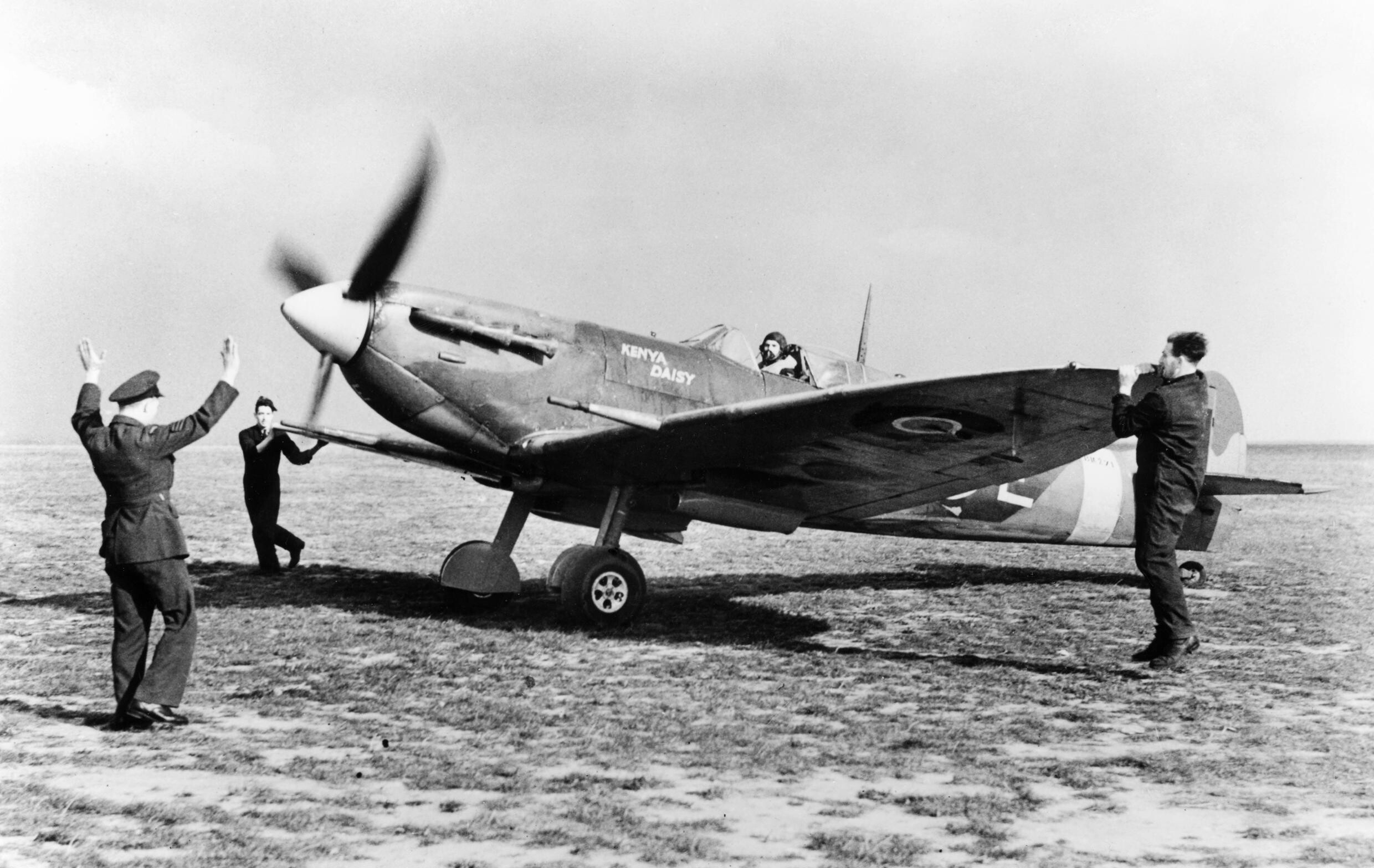
A Supermarine Spitfire of No. 165 Squadron at Gravesend, October 1942

Later in the year, No. 165 Squadron began operating from Tangmere, and on 8 November Hallowes damaged a Fw 190 off the French coast, in the region between Gravelines and Dunkirk. In early 1943, Hallowes was recognised for his successes with an award of the Distinguished Flying Cross (DFC). The published citation read:

Squadron Leader Hallows [sic] is an outstanding and relentless fighter. He has destroyed 19 and damaged many other enemy aircraft. His skill and unswerving devotion to duty have set an example in keeping with the highest traditions of the Royal Air Force.

— London Gazette, No. 35868, 19 January 1943

=== Later war service ===
Hallowes remained in command at No. 165 Squadron until March, at which time he was again rested. Seven months later, he returned to duty as the leader of No. 504 Squadron; this was to be his final operational flying posting. Based at Peterhead in Scotland, the squadron's Spitfires saw little action during Hallowes' period in command. In March 1944, he was made an acting wing commander and appointed station commander at RAF Dunsfold. His squadron leader rank was made substantive a few months later. Later in the year, he returned to instructing duties with a posting to No. 57 OTU at Eshott. In March 1945, Hallowes was posted to North Weald to serve as the deputy station commander there.

Hallowes ended the war credited with having shot down seventeen German aircraft, with a share in two more destroyed. He also is believed to have probably destroyed four aircraft and damaged eight.

== Postwar period ==
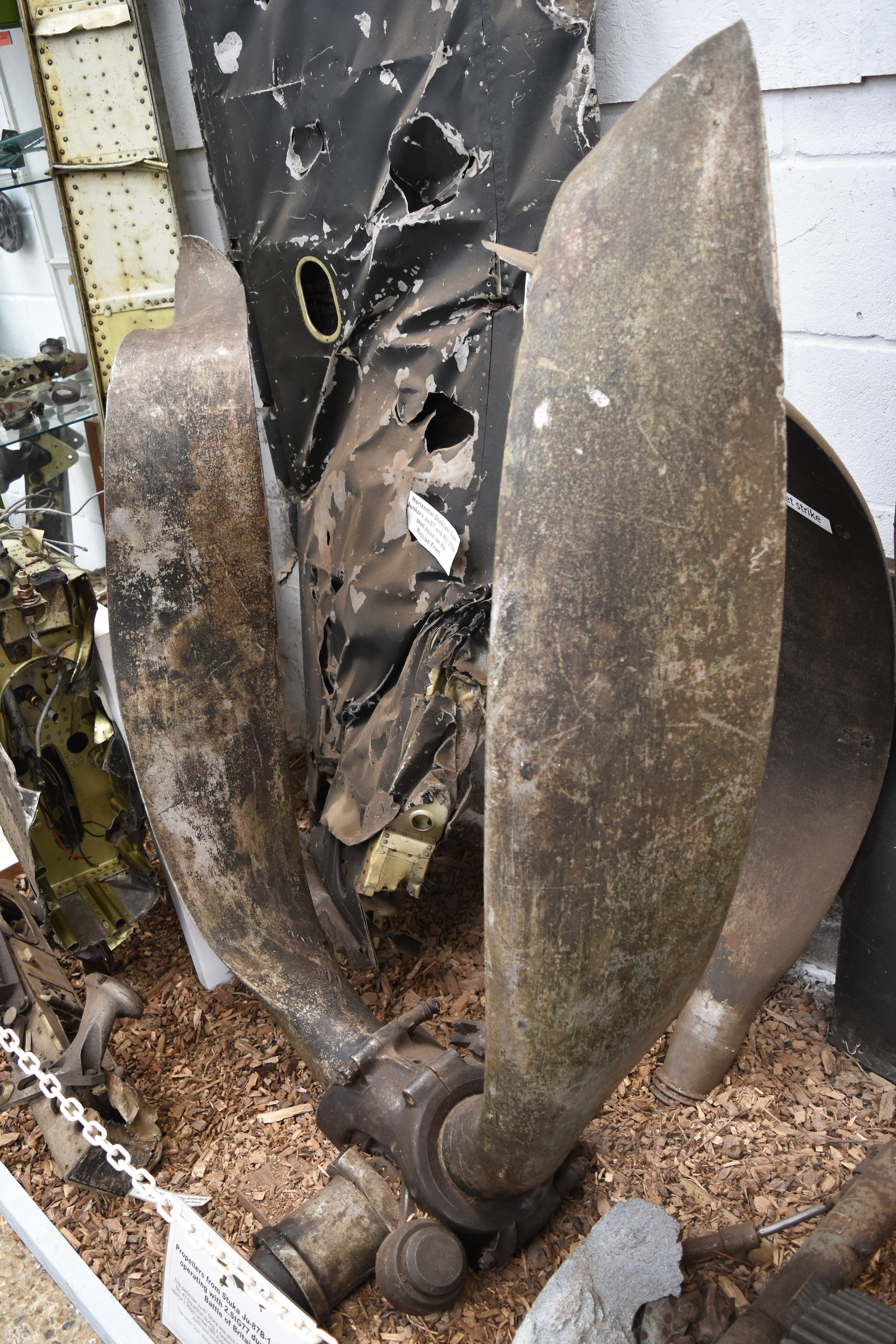
The propeller of a Junkers Ju 87 dive bomber that was shot down by Hallowes off Thorney Island on 18 August 1940, and later recovered during excavation of the crash site in the 1970s

Hallowes transferred to the Secretarial Branch of the RAF in July 1947, holding the rank of squadron leader. He retired from the RAF in July 1956 as a wing commander. Returning to civilian life, Hallowes subsequently worked for the British government in the Ministry of Transport. During the mid- to late-1970s, the remains of one of the Ju 87s that he is believed to have destroyed on The Hardest Day was excavated by aviation archeologists from a tributary of Chichester Harbour. Hallowes visited the site on a number of occasions during the retrieval of the wreckage of the Ju 87. While visiting Tenerife in the Canary Islands, he died on 20 October 1987. He is buried at St Andrew's Church at Tangmere.
