= John Hamar Hill =

British Royal Air Force officer (1912–1998)

- Born: 28 December 1912
- Died: 21 July 1998 (aged 85)
- Military career
- Allegiance: United Kingdom
- Branch: Royal Air Force
- Service years: 1932–1960
- Rank: Group Captain
- Nickname: "Johnnie"
- Commands: RAF Church Stanton; RAF Exeter; No. 222 Squadron RAF; No. 504 Squadron RAF
- Conflicts: Second World War: Battle of France; Battle of Britain
- Awards: Commander of the Order of the British Empire; Mentioned in Despatches

Group Captain John Hamar Hill, CBE (28 December 1912 – 21 July 1998) was a British Royal Air Force officer, who commanded No. 222 Squadron RAF during the Battle of Britain.

== Early life ==
Hill was born on 28 December 1912 and educated at Dover College, where he had been a college prefect and a good games player.

== RAF career ==
Hill took a commission in the Royal Air Force (RAF) in 1932. By 1940 he had taken command of No. 504 Squadron RAF, a Hurricane squadron. He was shot down over France and wounded in a famous incident where he was mistaken for a spy. After recovering from these injuries he was given command of No. 222 Squadron RAF, whose Spitfires suffered heavy losses in the Battle of Britain.

Later in the war Hill was appointed chief flying instructor at No. 57 Operational Training Unit and then Station Commander at RAF Exeter and RAF Church Stanton. In 1942 he was mentioned in despatches and posted to New Zealand as an Air Staff Officer. The end of the war saw Hill at Supreme Headquarters Allied Expeditionary Force, where he was promoted group captain. He was appointed a Commander of the Order of the British Empire in 1946.

After the war Hill was seconded to the French Air Ministry in 1950 and ended his career as Director of Command and Staff Training and then Senior Personnel Staff Officer. He retired in 1960 and became the Export Officer of the Society of British Aerospace Companies and a VIP co-ordinator at the Farnborough Air Show. He died in 1998.
