= RAF Peterhead =

Former airfield in Scotland

RAF Peterhead
- Longside, Aberdeenshire in Scotland
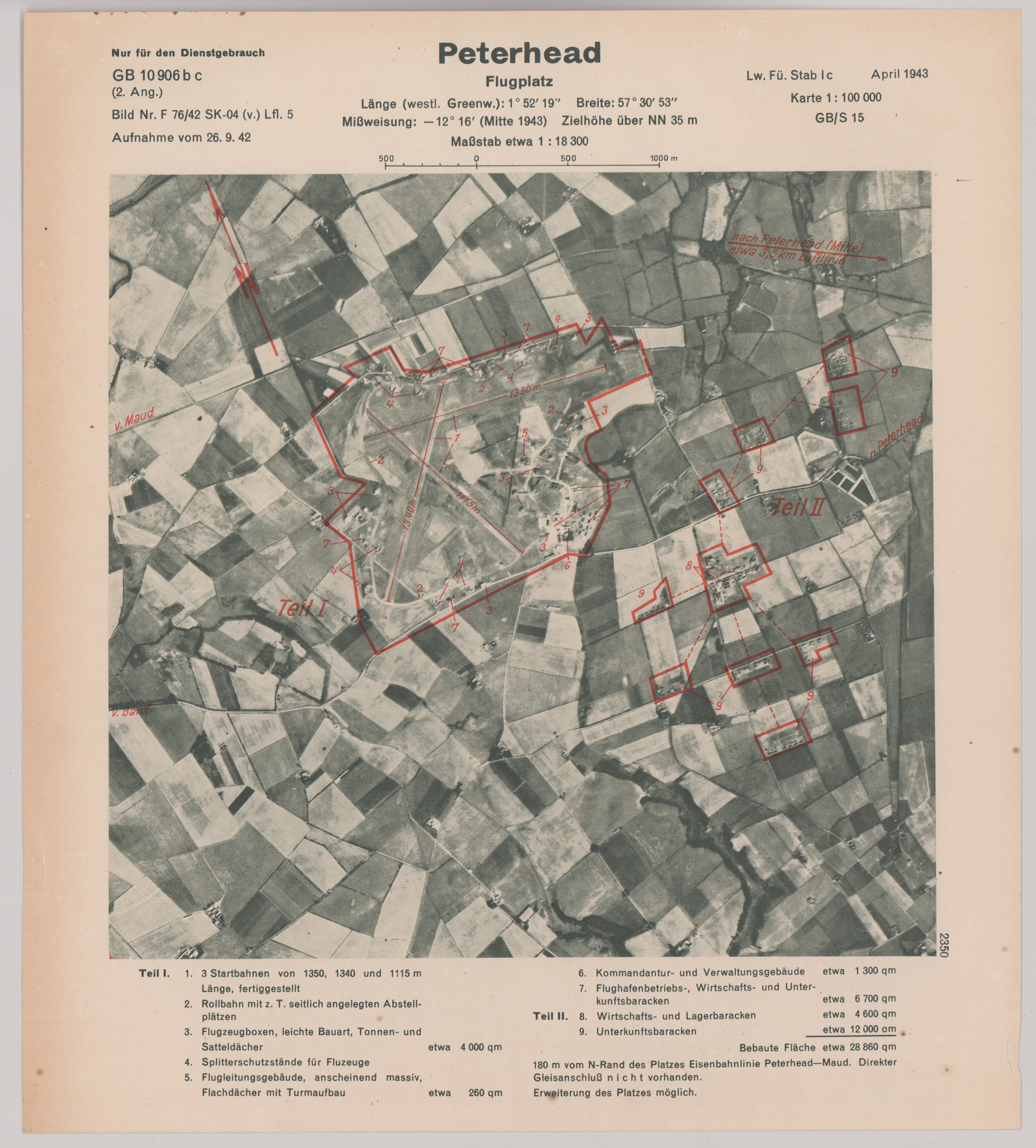
- RAF Peterhead on a target dossier of the German Luftwaffe, 1943

Site information
- Type: Sector Station
- Code: PH
- Owner: Air Ministry
- Operator: Royal Air Force
- Controlled by: RAF Fighter Command

Location
- Shown within Aberdeenshire RAF Peterhead (the United Kingdom)
- Coordinates: 57.517°N 1.875°W

Site history
- Built: 1941
- In use: July 1941 – August 1945
- Battles/wars: European theatre of World War II

Airfield information
- Elevation: 46 metres (151 ft) AMSL
Runways
Direction	Length and surface
10/28	1,200 metres (3,937 ft) Tarmac
04/22	1,300 metres (4,265 ft) Tarmac
16/34	1,100 metres (3,609 ft) Tarmac

Royal Air Force Peterhead or more simply RAF Peterhead is a former Royal Air Force sector station located 2.4 miles (3.9 km) east of Longside, Aberdeenshire and 3.4 miles (5.5 km) west of Peterhead, Aberdeenshire, Scotland.

== History ==
The airfield was built in 1941 and disbanded in 1945. During this period there were up to 2,000 RAF personnel based there, including around 250 WAAFs. A large number of RAF squadrons from a variety of nations used RAF Peterhead's five accommodation camps.

In November 1941 the station was hit by two bombs from a Junkers Ju 88 bomber, killing one person and injuring three others. Hawker Hurricane, Supermarine Spitfire and North American Mustang aircraft flew from Longside airfield to provide protection for eastern convoys.

During the 1990s, the airfield site was inspected and aerial photographs were taken as part of an assessment for a proposed pipeline running between St Fergus and Peterhead Power Station. These reports and photographs showed that pillboxes and many buildings still survived, although most of the land had by then returned to agricultural use. The control tower had been demolished. In November 2004, further investigation was undertaken. The report compared photographs from 1946, which showed the airfield and all its ancillary buildings, with photographs taken in June 1969. By then the hangars had been removed but many other buildings and pillboxes still survived.

=== Squadrons ===
- No. 19 Squadron RAF
- No. 26 (South African) Squadron RAF
- No. 63 Squadron RAF
- No. 65 (East India) Squadron RAF
- No. 68 Squadron RAF
- No. 118 Squadron RAF
- No. 122 (Bombay) Squadron RAF
- No. 125 (Newfoundland) Squadron RAF
- No. 129 (Mysore) Squadron RAF
- No. 132 (City of Bombay) Squadron RAF
- No. 164 (Argentine–British) Squadron RAF
- No. 165 (Ceylon) Squadron RAF
- No. 167 (Gold Coast) Squadron RAF
- No. 234 (Madras Presidency) Squadron RAF
- No. 245 (Northern Rhodesian) Squadron RAF
- No. 278 Squadron RAF
- No. 282 Squadron RAF
- No. 309 (Polish) Fighter-Reconnaissance Squadron Poland RAF
- No. 312 (Czechoslovak) Squadron RAF
- No. 313 (Czechoslovak) Squadron RAF
- No. 315 (Polish) Fighter Squadron Poland RAF
- No. 350 Squadron RAF
- No. 402 Squadron RCAF
- No. 409 Squadron RCAF
- No. 411 Squadron RCAF
- No. 414 Squadron RCAF
- No. 416 Squadron RCAF
- No. 430 Squadron RCAF
- No. 453 Squadron RAAF
- No. 504 (County of Nottingham) Squadron AAF
- No. 598 Squadron RAF
- No. 602 (City of Glasgow) Squadron AAF
- No. 603 (City of Edinburgh) Squadron AAF
- No. 611 (West Lancashire) Squadron AAF

=== Other units ===
- Satellite of No. 2 Flying Instructors School RAF (1943)
- No. 14 Fighter Command Servicing Unit
- No. 15 Armament Practice Camp RAF between 18 October 1943 and 21 February 1945
- No. 1479 (Anti-Aircraft Co-operation) Flight RAF (May 1942 - December 1943)
- No. 1491 (Fighter) Gunnery Flight RAF (October 1943)
- No. 2792 Squadron RAF Regiment
- No. 2803 Squadron RAF Regiment
- No. 2848 Squadron RAF Regiment

== Current use ==
The north-eastern section of the airfield has been taken over by Bond Helicopters and Bristows as a refuelling point for helicopters servicing North Sea oil platforms, roughly a 45-minute flight.

In 2003, after funds were successfully raised by the local branch of the Longside British Legion, a cairn monument was erected in memory of those who had served at RAF Peterhead, Longside airfield. At the time of the unveiling ceremony of the monument on 14 September 2003, there was a flypast from a Douglas Dakota of the Battle of Britain Memorial Flight.

More recently a stretch of the runway is used for flying radio controlled model aircraft.

== See also ==
- List of former Royal Air Force stations
