= Toužetín =

- Municipality
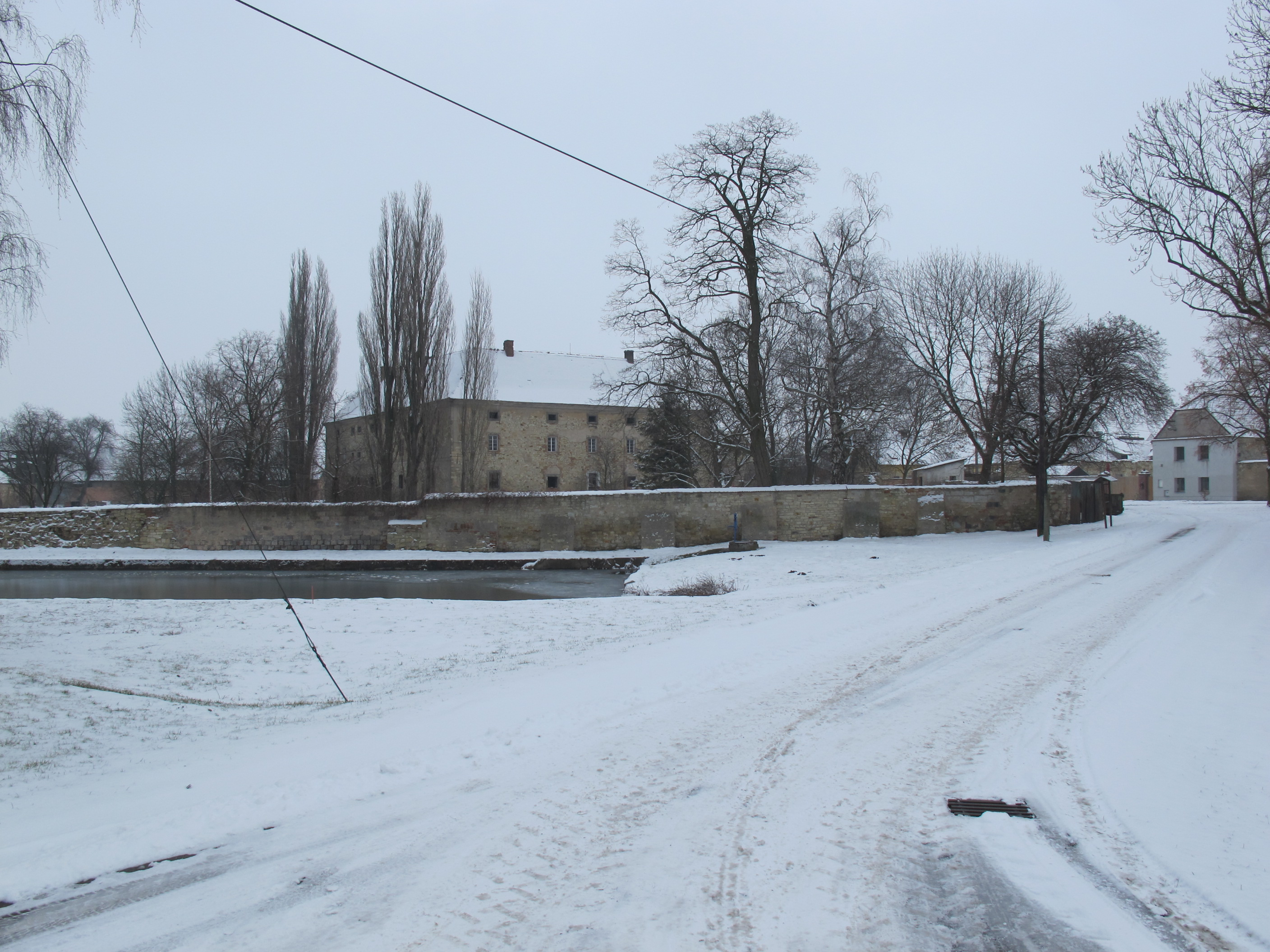
- Toužetín Castle

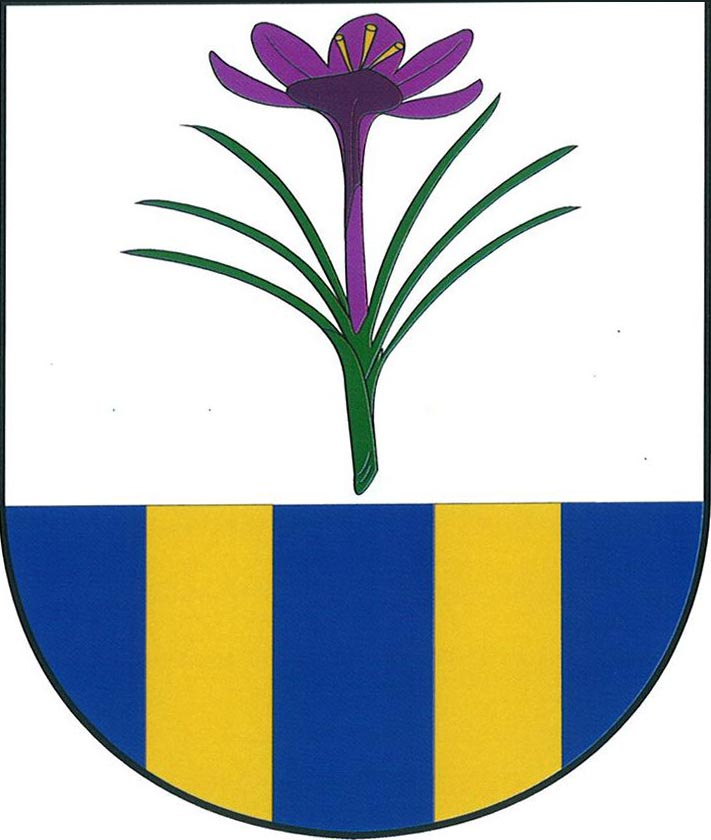
- Flag Coat of arms

- Location in the Czech Republic
- Coordinates: 50°18′55″N 13°53′10″E
- Country: Czech Republic
- Region: Ústí nad Labem
- District: Louny
- First mentioned: 1227

Area
  - Total: 7.37 km^{2} (2.85 sq mi)
- Elevation: 337 m (1,106 ft)

Population (2026-01-01)
  - Total: 264
  - Density: 35.8/km^{2} (92.8/sq mi)
- Time zone: UTC+1 (CET)
  - Summer (DST): UTC+2 (CEST)
- Postal code: 440 01
- Website: www.obectouzetin.cz

Toužetín is a municipality and village in Louny District in the Ústí nad Labem Region of the Czech Republic. It has about 300 inhabitants.

Toužetín lies approximately 7 kilometres (4 mi) south-east of Louny, 40 km (25 mi) south of Ústí nad Labem, and 47 km (29 mi) north-west of Prague.

== Administrative division ==
Toužetín consists of three municipal parts (in brackets population according to the 2021 census):

- Toužetín (140)
- Donín (85)
- Sulec (43)

== Demographics ==
Historical population
Year	Pop.	±%
1869	730	—
1880	815	+11.6%
1890	896	+9.9%
1900	848	−5.4%
1910	880	+3.8%
1921	781	−11.3%
1930	726	−7.0%
1950	506	−30.3%
1961	465	−8.1%
1970	391	−15.9%
1980	344	−12.0%
1991	276	−19.8%
2001	279	+1.1%
2011	271	−2.9%
2021	268	−1.1%
Source: Censuses

== Notable people ==
- František Fajtl (1912–2006), fighter pilot
