= Archibald Winskill =

British Royal Air Force officer

Sir Archibald Winskill
- Born: 24 January 1917; Penrith, Cumberland, England
- Died: 9 August 2005 (aged 88)
- Spouse: Christiane Bailleux
- Military career
- Allegiance: United Kingdom
- Branch: Royal Air Force
- Service years: 1937–1968
- Rank: Air Commodore
- Nickname: Archie
- Service number: 740365 (airman); 84702 (officer)
- Commands: RAF Duxford; RAF Turnhouse; No. 17 Squadron RAF; No. 232 Squadron RAF; No. 222 Squadron RAF; No. 165 Squadron RAF
- Conflicts: Second World War: Battle of Britain; Battle of Europe; Tunisia Campaign
- Awards: Knight Commander of the Royal Victorian Order; Commander of the Order of the British Empire; Distinguished Flying Cross & Bar; Air Efficiency Award
- Other work: Captain of the Queen's Flight (1968–82)

Air Commodore Sir Archibald Little Winskill, KCVO, CBE, DFC & Bar, AE (24 January 1917 – 9 August 2005) was a British Royal Air Force officer. He flew Spitfires in the Battle of Britain and evaded capture twice during the Second World War on two different continents. After the war, he held a number of appointment in different parts of the world. After retiring from the RAF, he became Captain of the Queen's Flight.

== Early life ==
Winskill was born on 24 January 1917 in Penrith, Cumberland, to James Winskill. He was educated at Penrith and Carlisle Grammar Schools.

== Military career ==
=== Second World War ===
In 1937 Winskill joined the Royal Air Force Volunteer Reserve and trained as a pilot. Following the outbreak of the Second World War, he was mobilised in September 1939. Between September 1939 and June 1940, he served as a staff pilot at RAF Catfoss. He was commissioned on 25 August 1940 as a pilot officer (on probation) with seniority from 15 August 1940.

Having trained to fly Spitfires, Winskill was posted to No. 72 Squadron RAF on 4 October 1940. He moved to No. 603 Squadron RAF based at RAF Hornchurch on 17 October. He flew in the Battle of Britain. Shortly after joining 603 Squadron, he scored his first aerial victory when he shot down a Messerschmitt Bf 109 over Dungeness, Kent, on 29 October 1940. In November, he shared in the destruction of a Heinkel He 111 with two other pilots from his squadron. On 23 November, he shot down two Fiat CR.42 fighters; it was one of the few air raids made on England by the Italian Air Force.

In January 1941, Winskill was appointed a flight commander of No. 41 Squadron RAF. With the squadron he flew fighter sweeps and bomber escort sorties over Nazi occupied France. On 14 August 1941, he was flying over France escorting bombers whose target was the St Omer railyards near Lille. One of the Blenheim bombers was attacked by two Messerschmitt 109 fighters. He went to its aid, shooting down one of the Messerschmitts. However, in the dogfight with the remaining Nazi fighter, his Spitfire sustained damage and burst into flames. He was forced to bale out at a low altitude from his out of control aircraft. He landed safely and a French farmer immediately ushered him to a cornfield where he hid until nightfall. The farmer' son, Felix Caron, then arrived to bring him to the safety of their farm in Saint-Folquin. On 25 August 1941, his commission was confirmed and he was promoted to war substantive flying officer with seniority in that rank from 15 August 1941. After two weeks in a French Resistance safe house, the French speaking Winskill was moved down the Pat Line. He travelled to the Pyrenees and then, via Andorra, Barcelona and Madrid, to British Gibraltar. He arrived back in England in December 1941; it had taken him three months to arrive back in England after being shot down.

As flying over Europe was forbidden to those who had used a Resistance escape route for fear that if captured they would divulge the information, Winskill was posted to an air defence squadron in Scotland. On 6 April 1942, he formed No. 165 Squadron RAF and served as its officer commanding until August. He was promoted to war substantive flight lieutenant on 14 July 1942. He was then appointed officer commanding No. 222 Squadron RAF, and in November 1942, he was appointed officer commanding No. 232 Squadron RAF. The squadron was posted to North Africa in December 1942. There, they provided close air support for the First Army in Algeria and Tunisia as part of the Desert Air Force. On 18 January 1943, he was shot down off the Tunisian coast and bale out into the sea. He was rescued by Arabs and taken to the shore. From there, he made his way back to his squadron through German-controlled positions. This made him one of the very few men who had evaded capture twice during World War II. In April 1943, he shot down a Junkers Ju 87 and shared in the destruction of a second one. He also destroyed two aircraft on the La Sebala Airfield.

Winskill's tour ended in June 1943, after which he returned to England. In September 1943, he became the Chief Instructor (Fighter Wing) at the Central Gunnery School, based at RAF Sutton Bridge, and some months later RAF Catfoss. He was then appointed as the Officer Commanding of the Pilot Gunnery Instructor Wing of the school, a post he served in between March 1944 and December 1944. On 21 June 1944, he was promoted to Squadron Leader. Subsequently, he attended and graduated from the British Army's Staff College, Camberley. In June 1945, he was posted to the Air Ministry, where he served as the Head of Admin Plans 3 in the Directorate of Administrative Plans.

=== Post-war service ===
Winskill continued his military service after the war ended and he was given a permanent commission in the Royal Air Force on 1 September 1945 in the rank of squadron leader. He continued to serve at the Air Ministry until 1947. He was then posted to Japan where he served as officer commanding No. 17 Squadron RAF who were part of the Allied occupation forces. Having converted to jets from the Spitfires he flew throughout the war, he was posted to the Belgian Air Force as an air adviser in 1949. During his three years there, he helped establish its first wing of Gloster Meteor jet fighters. As part of the half-yearly promotions, he was promoted to Wing Commander on 1 January 1953, and to group captain on 1 July 1959. He served a station commander of RAF Turnhouse and then RAF Duxford.

In 1961, Winskill was appointed Group Captain Operations at the headquarters of Royal Air Force Germany. As part of the half-yearly promotions, he was promoted to air commodore on 1 July 1963. He was posted to Paris, France, as an air attaché, in February 1964. In June 1967, he was appointed Director of Public Relations for the RAF at the Ministry of Defence. This his final posting before his retirement.

Winskill retired from the Royal Air Force on 18 December 1968 after 31 years service.

== Later life ==
On 15 February 1968, Winskill was appointed Captain of the Queen's Flight. In that role he did not fly the aircraft but was responsible for the safety and comfort of the Royal passengers in addition to commanding the flight. His arrival coincided with the introduction of the Westland Wessex helicopter and the Hawker Siddeley Andover aircraft to the Flight. In July 1971, he oversaw the first parachute jump by an heir to the throne when Charles, Prince of Wales completed one over the Channel. In 1972, he had to arrange for the body of the Duke of Windsor to be flown from France to RAF Benson for his funeral. He retired in 1982.

A favourite of Queen Elizabeth The Queen Mother, Winskill would make yearly visits to the Castle of Mey, her summer residence, until her death. He played golf and tennis, and was a bridge player.

Winskill died on 9 August 2005, aged 88.

== Personal life ==
In 1947, Winskill married Christiane Bailleux, from the Pas de Calais, France. Together they had two children; a daughter and a son. Their son pre-deceased him. His wife survived him as did their daughter.

== Honours and decorations ==
On 6 January 1942, Winskill was awarded the Distinguished Flying Cross (DFC) 'in recognition of gallantry displayed in flying operations against the enemy'. His citation read:

This officer has carried out over 250 hours operational flying and has destroyed at least 3 enemy aircraft. One day in August, 1941, he attacked 2 Messerschmitt 109's which attempted to intercept our bombers. He destroyed one of the enemy fighters and his action certainly saved the bomber from serious attack.

On 27 July 1943, he was awarded a further Distinguished Flying Cross. This was shown in the form of a medal bar attached to his original DFC. He was awarded the Air Efficiency Award (AE) in 1944 for long service in the Royal Auxiliary Air Force.

In the 1960 Queen's Birthday Honours, he was appointed Commander of the Order of the British Empire (CBE). In the 1973 Queen's Birthday Honours, he was appointed Commander of the Royal Victorian Order (CVO). In the 1980 New Year Honours, he was promoted to Knight Commander of the Royal Victorian Order (KCVO).

Ribbon	Details
	Knight Commander of the Royal Victorian Order (1980); Commander of the Royal Victorian Order (1973)
	Commander of the Order of the British Empire (1960)
	Distinguished Flying Cross (1942) and bar (1943)
	1939–45 Star with Battle of Britain clasp
	Air Crew Europe Star
	Africa Star with NORTH AFRICA 1942–43 clasp
	Defence Medal
	War Medal 1939–1945
	Queen Elizabeth II Silver Jubilee Medal (1977)
	Air Efficiency Award (1944)

He was appointed extra equerry to Queen Elizabeth II on 15 February 1968. He was awarded the Freedom of the City of London in 1978.
