= No. 313 (Czechoslovak) Squadron RAF =

Defunct flying squadron of the Royal Air Force

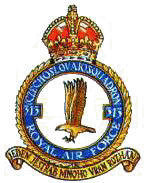
- Badge of № 313 Squadron RAF
- Active: 10 May 1941 – 15 February 1946
- Country: United Kingdom
- Allegiance: (Czech Republic) Czechoslovakia
- Branch: Royal Air Force
- Nickname(s): Czechoslovak
- Motto(s): (Czech): Jeden jestřáb mnoho vran rozhání ("One hawk chases away many crows")

Insignia
- Squadron Badge: A hawk volant, wings elevated and addorsed
- Squadron Codes: RY (May 1941 – February 1946)

No. 313 Squadron RAF was a Czechoslovak-manned fighter squadron of the Royal Air Force in the Second World War.

== History ==
The squadron was formed at RAF Catterick on 10 May 1941. It was the last RAF squadron to be formed mostly of escaped Czechoslovak pilots. Its first commander was the British Squadron Leader Gordon Sinclair. On 29 July, Czechoslovak fighter pilot Josef Jaške was appointed as joint commander of the squadron. The plan was for responsibility to be transferred gradually from Sinclair to Jaške.

The squadron was equipped initially with Supermarine Spitfire I fighters. On 30 June 1941 it moved to RAF Leconfield in the East Riding of Yorkshire. In August the squadron was re-equipped with the Spitfire IIA, and on 25 August it moved to RAF Portreath in Cornwall. In October the squadron was re-equipped with the Spitfire VB/C.

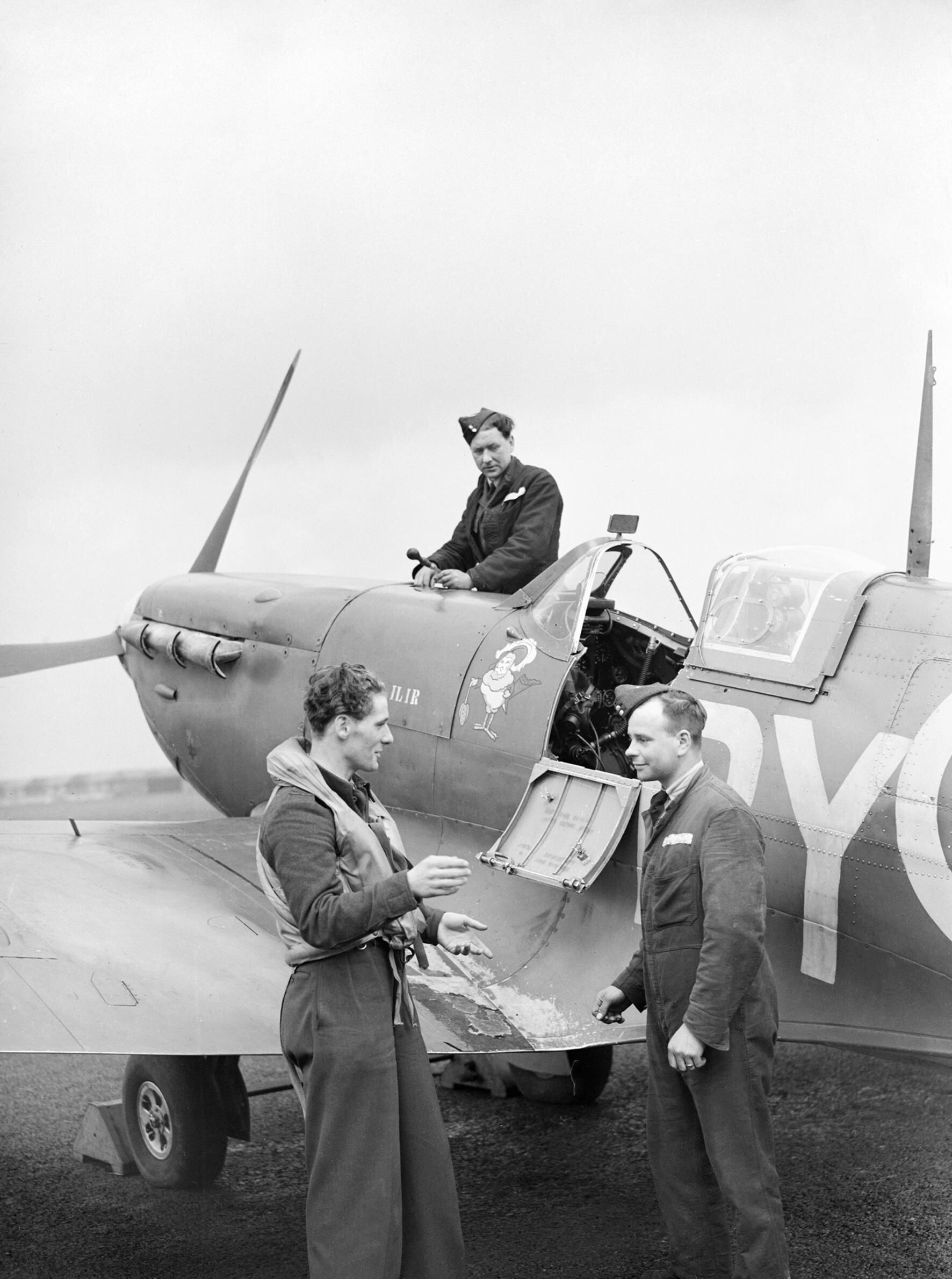
A 313 squadron pilot with a rigger, fitter and his Spitfire at RAF Hornchurch in April 1942

On 15 December 1941 Sqn Ldr Karel Mrázek succeeded Jaške as commanding officer and the squadron moved to RAF Hornchurch in Essex. On 8 June 1942 the squadron moved to RAF Church Stanton in Somerset and on 26 June Sqn Ldr Jaroslav Himr succeeded Mrázek as commanding officer.

In 1943 the squadron moved to Scotland, firstly on 28 June to RAF Sumburgh "A" in Shetland, and shortly thereafter to RAF Peterhead "B" in Aberdeenshire. The squadron briefly flew the Spitfire VI in June and July 1943. On 20 July it moved to RAF Hawkinge in Kent. On 18 September it moved to RAF Ibsley in Hampshire and on 24 September Sqn Ldr František Fajtl succeeded Himr as commanding officer.

On 1 February 1944 Sqn Ldr Václav Bergman succeeded Fajtl as commanding officer. Also in February the squadron was re-equipped with the Spitfire IX. This model was fitted with 190-gallon "slipper" tanks to extend its range, enabling the squadron to escort bombers on raids deep into Germany. On 20 February the squadron moved to RAF Mendlesham in Suffolk. On 14 March it moved again, to RAF Rochford in Essex.

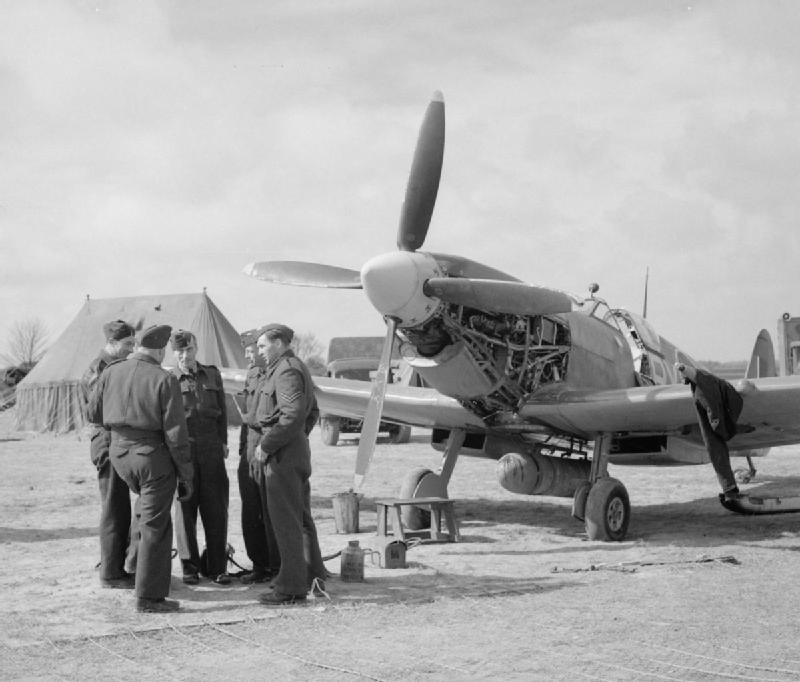
Ground crew changing the engine oil of a Spitfire LF My IX at RAF Appledram

On 3 April 1944 the squadron moved to RAF Appledram in West Sussex. On 22 May Sqn Ldr Alois Hochmál succeeded Bergman as commanding officer. From 29 June the squadron spent a few days at RAF Tangmere, also in West Sussex. On 4 July it spent a week at RAF Lympne in Kent.

On 11 July 1944 the squadron moved to RAF Skeabrae on Orkney in Scotland. The squadron briefly flew the Spitfire VII in July and August 1944.

On 3 October 1944 the squadron moved to RAF North Weald in Essex. Also in October it reverted to the Spitfire IX, which it continued to operate until the end of its history as an RAF unit. On 1 September 1944 Sqn Ldr Karel Kasal succeeded Hochmál as commanding officer, and on 15 November Sqn Ldr Otmar Kučera succeeded Kasal. On 29 December the squadron moved to RAF Bradwell Bay, also in Essex.

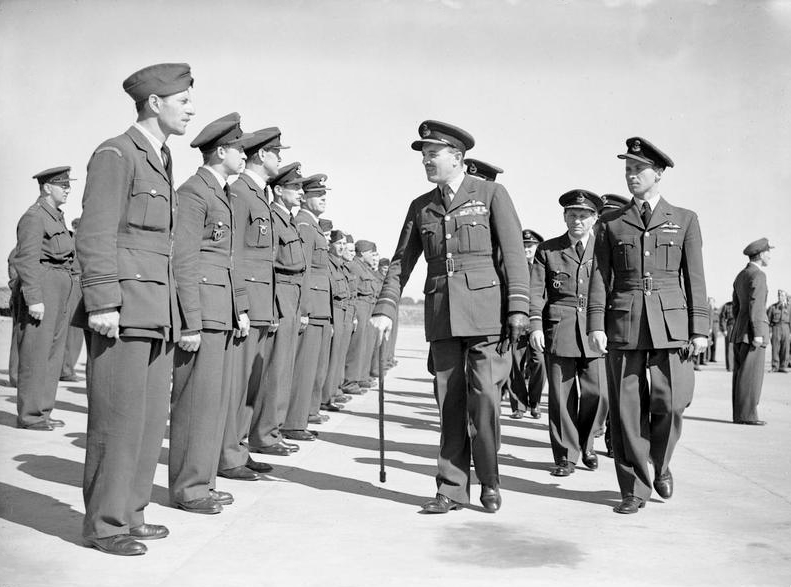
Farewell parade of Czechoslovak squadrons at RAF Manston, Kent, on 3 August 1945. Air Marshal John Slessor, with walking stick, inspects some of the men. Air Marshal Karel Janoušek can be seen behind him.

From 27 February to 8 May 1945 the squadron was based at RAF Manston in Kent. On 3 August members of all of the RAF's Czechoslovak squadrons held a farewell parade at RAF Manston. Air Marshal John Slessor inspected the parade, accompanied by A/M Karel Janoušek. On 24 August 313 Squadron moved to Ruzyně Airport in Prague. It became a squadron of the new Czechoslovak Air Force, and on 15 February 1946 was officially disbanded as an RAF squadron.

== Aircraft operated ==
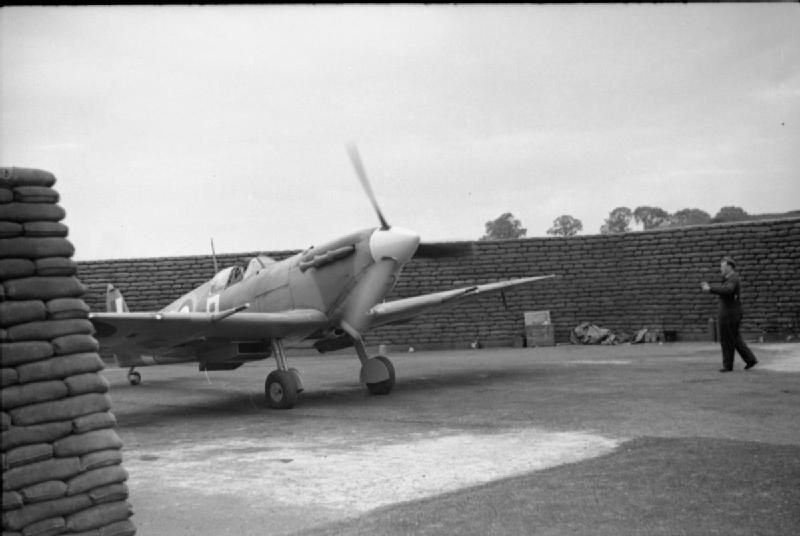
A Spitfire Mk Vb in a sandbagged revetment at RAF Hornchurch in 1942 or 1943 as its pilot runs up its engine

Aircraft used
From	To	Aircraft	Variant	Notes
May 1941	August 1941	Supermarine Spitfire	I	
August 1941	November 1941	Supermarine Spitfire	IIa	
October 1941	February 1944	Supermarine Spitfire	Vb/c	
June 1943	July 1943	Supermarine Spitfire	VI	
February 1944	July 1944	Supermarine Spitfire	LF.IX	
July 1944	August 1944	Supermarine Spitfire	VII	
July 1944	October 1944	Supermarine Spitfire	Vb/c	
October 1944	February 1946	Supermarine Spitfire	LF.IX	
