= Ernest Joyce (RNZAF officer) =

New Zealand flying ace

Ernest Leslie Joyce
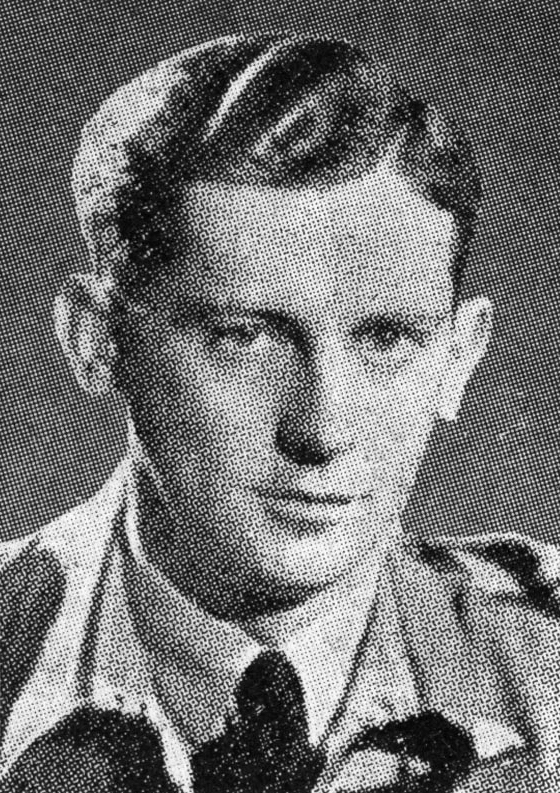
- Born: 17 February 1920; Hamilton, New Zealand
- Died: 17 June 1944 (aged 24) near Évreux, France
- Burial place: Marville-Les-Bois Communal Cemetery, France
- Military career
- Allegiance: New Zealand
- Branch: Royal New Zealand Air Force (1940–1944) †
- Rank: Squadron leader
- Nickname: Nipper
- Commands: No. 122 Squadron; No. 73 Squadron
- Conflicts: Second World War; Channel Front; Western Desert campaign; Italian campaign; Operation Overlord
- Awards: Distinguished Flying Medal

Ernest Leslie Joyce, DFM (17 February 1920 – 17 June 1944) was a New Zealand flying ace of the Royal New Zealand Air Force (RNZAF) during the Second World War. He is credited with the destruction of at least nine enemy aircraft.

Born in Hamilton, Joyce joined the RNZAF in 1940. After completing his flight training, the latter part of which was received in the United Kingdom, he was posted to the Royal Air Force's No. 3 Squadron where he flew a Hawker Hurricane. In early 1942 he was dispatched to the Middle East, to fly with No. 73 Squadron in Egypt. Still flying Hurricanes, he shot down his first enemy aircraft in May and several more followed over the next few months. Having been commissioned after being awarded the Distinguished Flying Medal in August 1942, he was sent to a training unit later that year; he returned to No. 73 Squadron in mid–1943 as its commanding officer and led the squadron, now operating Supermarine Spitfires, in operations over Italy until November. Returning to England, he was given command of No. 122 Squadron, which was equipped with the North American P-51 Mustang. Flying as part of the 2nd Tactical Air Force in support of the Allied landings in Normandy, he was shot down and killed while strafing a train.

== Early life ==
Ernest Leslie Joyce was born in Hamilton, New Zealand, on 17 February 1920 to Ernest Joyce and his wife, Cora Joyce. His father died later that year. Nicknamed Nipper, on account of his short stature, he was educated at the Marist Brothers school in Hamilton East before going on to Hamilton Technical High School. Interested in flying, he qualified as a pilot in 1939 and was a member of the Civil Air Reserve.

== Second World War ==
In March 1940, Joyce, a salesman at the time, joined the Royal New Zealand Air Force (RNZAF). He was sent for training to the RNZAF base at Wigram Aerodrome and in late 1940, with others from his flight school intake, including future fellow flying ace Desmond Scott, he sailed to England as a sergeant pilot to serve in the Royal Air Force (RAF). After his arrival, he received further flight training at RAF Sutton Bridge, where he learnt to fly the Hawker Hurricane.

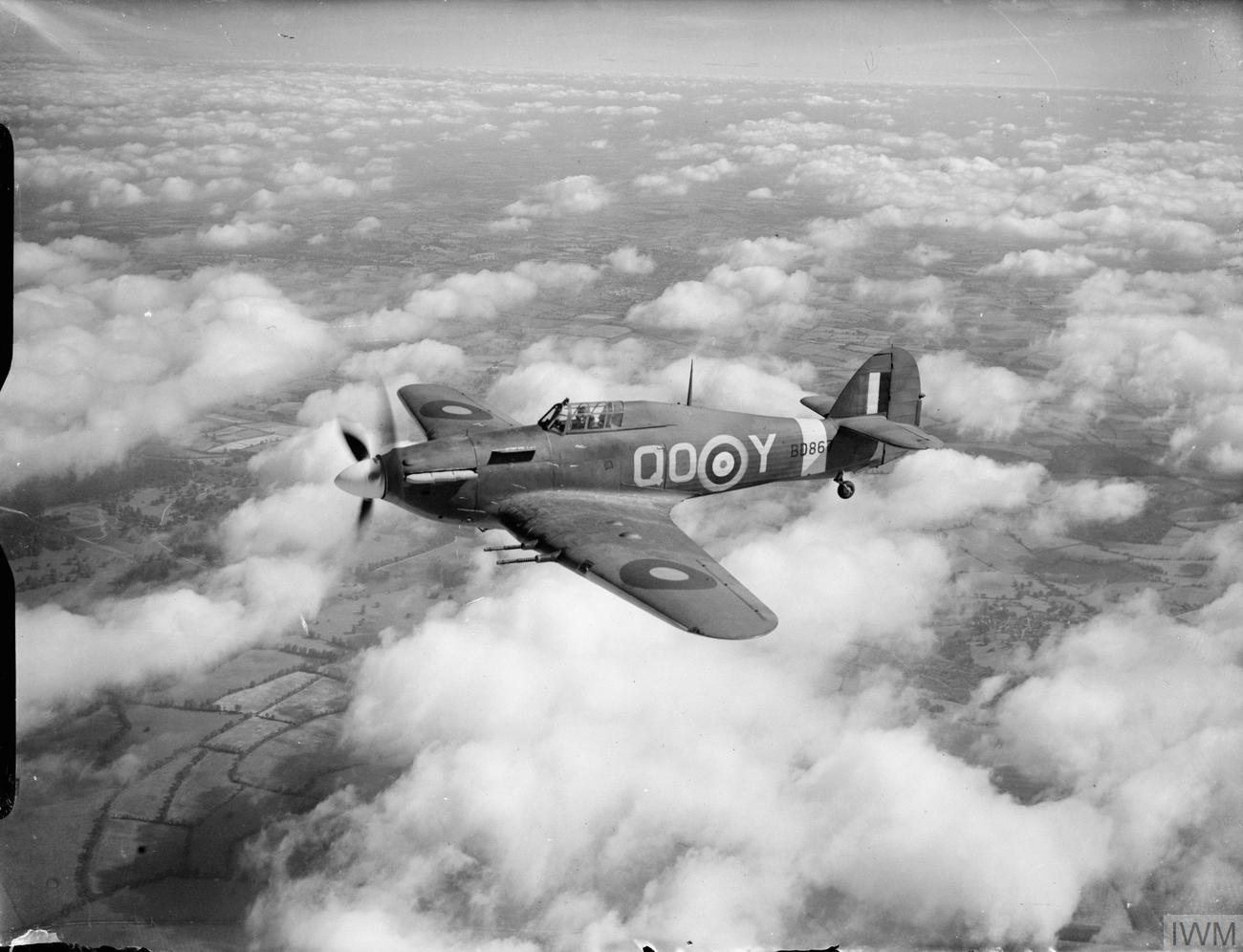
A Hurricane Mk IIC of No. 3 Squadron

=== Channel Front ===
In January 1941, along with Scott, he was posted to RAF Fighter Command, joining No. 3 Squadron, based at RAF Skeabrae in the Orkney Islands and equipped with Hurricanes. The squadron, commanded by fellow New Zealander Russell Aitken, was transferred to Martlesham Heath near Ipswich the following spring, becoming part of No. 11 Group. The squadron commenced a variety of duties: fighter sweeps, attacks on enemy shipping in the English Channel, escort missions, and night-fighter duties.

=== North Africa ===
The number of trained pilots arriving in England from flight training in Canada under the Empire Air Training Scheme resulted in a surplus of flying personnel, and several personnel of No. 3 Squadron, including Joyce, were sent to other units. He was posted to No. 73 Squadron, based in the Western Desert, in early 1942 and was soon encountering the enemy; flying a Hurricane, he damaged a Messerschmitt Bf 110 on 5 February and nearly a week later was credited with damaging a Messerschmitt Bf 109. He encountered another Bf 109 near Tobruk on 12 February and from the resulting engagement claimed it as a probable. In May he was promoted to flight sergeant.

On the night of 25–26 May, while flying a night patrol over airfields of the Desert Air Force, Joyce shot down a Junkers Ju 88 medium bomber. Another Bf 109 was claimed as a probable on 9 June. Later in the month while flying at night, this time near Maaten Bagush on 26/27 June, Joyce saw a Ju 88 400 feet (120 m) above him. Closing in, he opened fire with the four cannons of his Hurricane. Despite three of them jamming, the Ju 88 was successfully shot down. A week later he shot down a Bf 109 and damaged another. On 7 July he destroyed a Fiat CR.42 Falco of the Regia Aeronautica and this was followed by another CR.42 three days later. For his exploits, Joyce was awarded the Distinguished Flying Medal. The citation, published in The London Gazette read:

During a long and continuous period of service, this airman has performed splendid work. In low level machine gun attacks on enemy ground targets he has displayed great determination and achieved much success. On one occasion, at night, he participated in an attack on the aerodrome at Martuba. Despite heavy defensive fire, he machinegunned dispersed aircraft on the ground from only 50 feet. In this vigorous attack he assisted in the probable destruction of several enemy aircraft. On another occasion at night, he observed a Junkers 88 flying at some 400 feet above him. Skilfully manoeuvring his aircraft he closed in on the rear of the enemy aircraft whose pilot began to take violent evasive action. Flight Sergeant Joyce, however countered every move and, eventually closing in, shot down the enemy aircraft from close range. He has destroyed at least 5 enemy aircraft, 2 of them at night. Throughout, his operational career, this airman has displayed great gallantry, tenacity and devotion to duty.

— London Gazette, No. 35675, 21 August 1942.

Within days, Joyce destroyed two more Ju 88s; one on the night of 24–25 August, over Borg El Arab, and the other on 30–31 August. Towards the end of the year Joyce, now a commissioned officer, was posted to the training flight of No. 243 Wing. Here, while flying an older Hurricane, he shot down a further Ju 88 on 2–3 December. By the end of the year he had been promoted to flight lieutenant. In July 1943, he was posted back to No. 73 Squadron as its commander, holding the rank of squadron leader. Flying Supermarine Spitfires, it was operating along the Adriatic coast, supporting partisans in the Balkans. He remained in command until November at which time he was recalled to the United Kingdom.

=== Service in Europe ===
Joyce was given command of No. 122 Squadron, which operated Mustang Mk. III fighters, in May 1944. Briefly operating from the RAF station at Ford before a shift to Funtington, the squadron was part of the 2nd Tactical Air Force. It flew numerous operations in the lead up to the Operation Overlord, the invasion of Normandy, escorting bombers and dive-bombing attacks on targets in France. On one of these operations, on 1 June, Joyce destroyed a Heinkel He 111 medium bomber. On D-Day, the squadron escorted the gliders and transports carrying airborne troops to Normandy. It later switched to supporting the ground forces in their operations on the beachhead. On 17 June, while strafing trains near Évreux, he was shot down and killed. He was buried at Marville-Les-Bois Communal Cemetery, near Dreux. According to the local priest who wrote to Joyce's mother after the war, Joyce's funeral was well attended by the local community.

Joyce is credited with the destruction of nine enemy aircraft, with another two probably destroyed, and three damaged.
