= No. 165 Squadron RAF =

Defunct flying squadron of the Royal Air Force

No. 165 (Ceylon) Squadron RAF
- Active: 1 June 1918 – 4 July 1918; 6 April 1942 – 1 September 1946
- Country: United Kingdom
- Branch: Royal Air Force
- Type: Inactive
- Nickname(s): Ceylon
- Motto(s): Infensa virtuti invidia Latin: Envy is the foe of virtue

Commanders
- Notable commanders: Archibald Winskill; Herbert Hallowes

No. 165 Squadron RAF was a unit of the Royal Air Force that was formed during World War I and served during World War II. The squadron has been formed twice.

Initially formed on 1 June 1918 as a nucleus, it did not see active service before being disbanded on 4 July 1918.

Reformed on 6 April 1942 at RAF Ayr, Scotland with Supermarine Spitfire as a fighter squadron and became operational on defensive duties on 1 May. The squadron moved to RAF Eastchurch, England on 15 August to take part in sweeps over northern France, moving to RAF Gravesend on 20 August and again to RAF Tangmere on 2 November, until returning to RAF Peterhead, Scotland on 29 March 1943.

In May 1943, Spitfires from the squadron intercepted a Junkers Ju 88 off the Scottish coast. The aircraft was being flown by crew who intended to defect to the allied side. The Ju 88 waggled its wings and dropped flares, signaling the intent to surrender, and the Spitfires escorted it to a landing at RAF Dyce. The RAF pilots were Mentioned in Dispatches for taking the risk not to open fire on the Ju 88 upon interception. The capture of this aircraft was of great intelligence value at the time, as it was fitted with the latest FuG 202 Liechtenstein BC A.I radar.

On 30 June, the squadron relocated to RAF Ibsley, England before moving to RAF Exeter, then RAF Kenley before moving to RAF Church Stanton, later renamed as RAF Culmhead, and was assigned to provide bomber escort missions over France and Germany. Escorts, convoys patrols, sweeps over northwest France and local air defence occupied the squadron until after the invasion moving to RAF Colerne on 10 February 1944, then back to RAF Culmhead on 10 March, then RAF Predannack on 2 April. The squadron was moved to RAF Harrowbeer on 20 June, then RAF Detling on 22 June, to help combat flying-bomb attacks and provide escort for bomber forces. The squadron was moved to RAF Lympne on 12 July and then RAF Detling on 10 August.

The squadron moved to RAF Bentwaters on 15 December, where the squadron was re-equipped with North American Mustangs becoming operational again in February 1945 and began long-range missions. With the end of the war in Europe, the squadron moved to RAF Dyce to re-equip with Spitfires and prepare to be transferred to Norway in mid June. The squadron provided air defence for a period of six months until the Royal Norwegian Air Force had reorganised. The squadron disbanded on 1 September 1946 after returning home with its aircraft passing to No. 66 Squadron.

== Squadron codes ==
Squadron code	Allocated
SK	1942 - 1946
