= RAF Culmhead =

Former Royal Air Force station in Somerset, England

RAF Culmhead RAF Church Stanton
- Churchstanton, Somerset in England
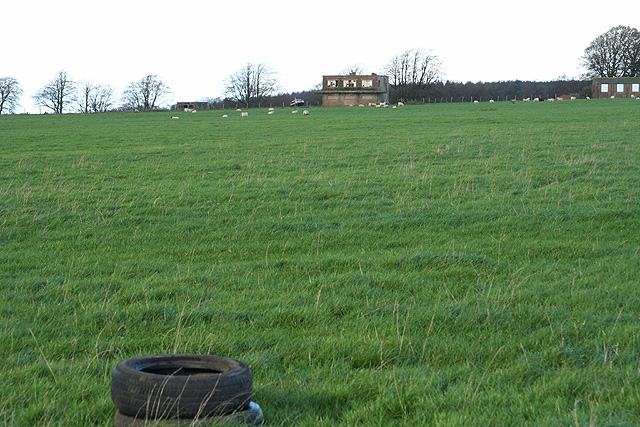
- The old control tower taken in 2006

Site information
- Type: Royal Air Force station
- Code: UC
- Owner: Air Ministry
- Operator: Royal Air Force; Royal Navy
- Controlled by: RAF Fighter Command 1941-44 * No. 10 Group RAF; RAF Flying Training Command 1944- * No. 23 Group RAF

Location
- Shown within Somerset RAF Culmhead (the United Kingdom)
- Coordinates: 50°55′46″N 003°07′42″W

Site history
- Built: 1941
- In use: August 1941 – August 1946
- Battles/wars: European theatre of World War II

Airfield information
- Elevation: 263 metres (863 ft) AMSL
Runways
Direction	Length and surface
02/20	1,320 metres (4,331 ft) Concrete
08/26	1,025 metres (3,363 ft) Concrete
14/32	1,190 metres (3,904 ft) Concrete

Royal Air Force Culmhead or more simply RAF Culmhead is a former Royal Air Force station, situated at Churchstanton on the Blackdown Hills in Somerset, England. It was originally named RAF Church Stanton.

It had three tarmac runways that are now in poor condition and the control towers are currently derelict. There is now an industrial estate – derived from the later Composite Signals Organisation Station (CSOS) – right in the middle of the place where the three runways meet.

== History ==
=== Second World War ===
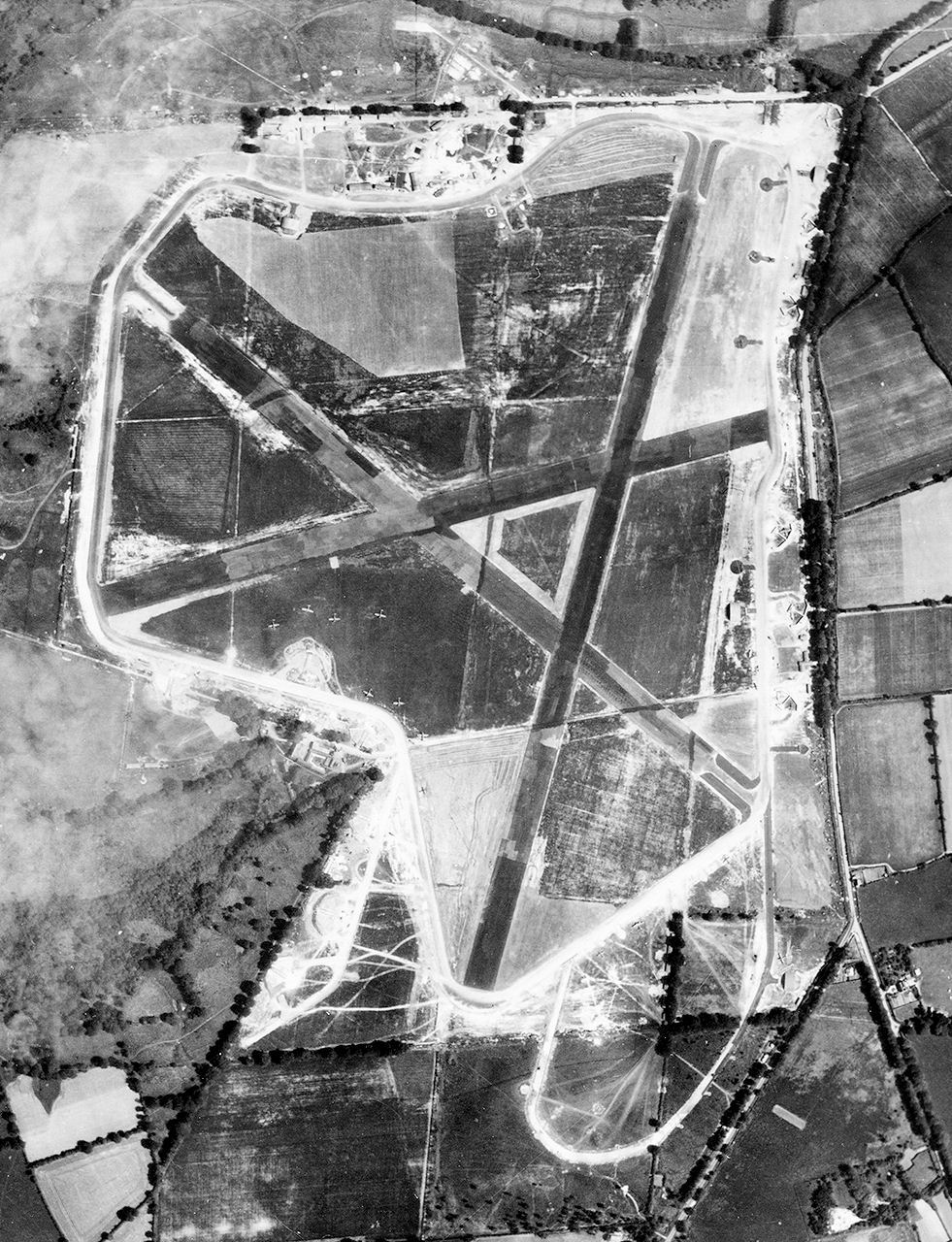
Aerial photograph of Churchstanton airfield, looking north, 26 June 1942. Note several fighter aircraft parked on the grassy areas.

RAF Culmhead was a typical three-runway fighter airfield, with blast pens built around the site along with ten blister hangars. It was used by fighters from RAF Exeter from June but officially opened on 1 August 1941. Ground defence was provided by the Somerset Light Infantry.

Who used the airfield first and why is a mystery, the story is told by David Berryman:

"The first aircraft to land at the new airfield did so when it was unfinished, arriving early one morning. Its pilot approached Mr Long, a roller driver, who was just getting up steam, but neither could understand one another, and when the pilot sprinted back to his aircraft and took off. Long realised that it was probably a German bomber that had landed in error". (Berryman 2009, 98)

The airfield was occupied by No. 2 Polish Wing of the Polish Air Force. The first squadrons to arrive were No. 316 (Warsaw) and No. 302 (Poznań) equipped with Hawker Hurricane Mk.Is. No. 302 soon left to be replaced with No. 306 (Torun) who operated Supermarine Spitfires. In the summer of 1942 the polish squadrons were replaced by No. 313 and No. 312 Squadrons which were Czechoslovak-manned. The site was also used for the testing of barrage balloon wire cutters in 1942 by 02 Detachment of the Royal Aircraft Establishment from Farnborough.

In 1943 the Czech units were replaced with No. 66 and No. 504 (City of Nottingham) Squadrons.

RAF Culmhead was initially known as RAF Churchstanton, but it was renamed on 22 December 1943 to avoid confusion with RAF Church Fenton. It was then used by No. 165 and No. 131 (County of Kent) Squadrons. In 1944 the Royal Navy's 24th Naval Fighter Wing took over with 894 and 887 Naval Air Squadrons using Culmhead as a location for their Supermarine Seafires, which were a naval version of the Supermarine Spitfire specially adapted for operation from aircraft carriers.

After D-Day in 1944, the airfield was used for training on Gloster Meteors, the first jet engined aircraft in RAF service. No. 616 Squadron RAF tested them Culmhead before deploying them for their first operational sortie on 27 July from RAF Manston when it intercepted V-1 flying bombs launched against southern England.

In the autumn of 1944 the surviving squadrons were transferred to other sites and the station wound down, becoming a glider training school and maintenance unit until RAF Culmhead closed in August 1946.

The following units were also here at some point:

- No. 3 Glider Training School RAF (September 1944 - July 1945)
- No. 67 Maintenance Unit RAF (September 1945 - April 1946)
- No. 126 Squadron RAF (1944)
- No. 154 Squadron RAF (1942)
- No. 234 Squadron RAF (1943)
- No. 286 Squadron RAF (1944)
- No. 587 Squadron RAF (1944)
- No. 610 Squadron RAF (1944)
- 790 Naval Air Squadron
- No. 2790 Squadron RAF Regiment
- No. 2791 Squadron RAF Regiment
- Glider Instructors Flight RAF (January 1945)
- Research Department Flight (March 1942 - March 1944)

=== Postwar use ===
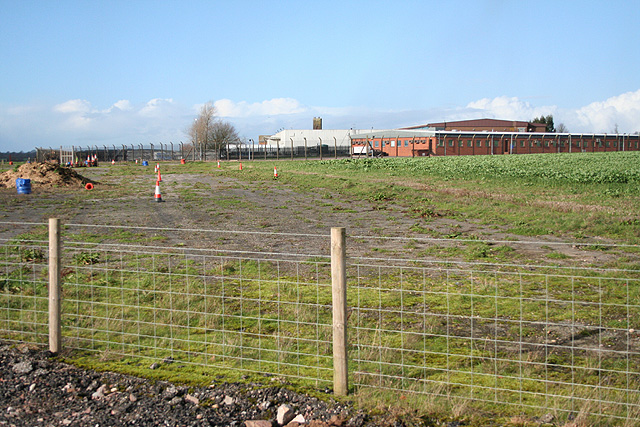
Industrial estate, built on the site of the signals unit. Taken in 2006

From the 1950s, the site was partially reused as Composite Signals Organisation Station (CSOS) Culmhead, performing signals research functions, operated under the aegis of Government Communications Headquarters (GCHQ), with a cluster of buildings covering some 4.4 hectares being constructed approximately in the centre of the former airfield. It was closed in this role in 1999.

Several of the control towers and fighter pens have been designated as Scheduled Ancient Monuments and are included in the Heritage at Risk Register produced by English Heritage.
