= No. 222 Squadron RAF =

Former flying squadron of the Royal Air Force

No. 222 (Natal) Squadron RAF
- Active: 1 April 1918 - 27 February 1919; 5 October 1939 - 1 November 1957; 1 May 1960 – 30 June 1964
- Country: United Kingdom
- Branch: Royal Air Force
- Nickname: Natal
- Mottos: Zulu: Pambili bo ("Go straight ahead")

Commanders
- Notable commanders: Richard Peirse; "Johnnie" Hill; Herbert Hallowes; Archibald Winskill

Insignia
- Squadron Badge heraldry: A wildebeest in full course The wildebeest comes from the armorial bearings of Natal, the squadron being the Natal gift squadron; the wildebeest also symbolises speed.
- Post 1950 squadron roundel
- Squadron Codes: ZD (Oct 1939 - 1953)

No. 222 Squadron was a Royal Air Force fighter squadron.

== History ==
=== In the First World War ===
The squadron was formally formed at Thasos on 1 April 1918 from "A" Squadron of the former No. 2 Wing, RNAS when the Royal Air Force was formed. At this time, Richard Peirse became Officer Commanding 222 Squadron. Later, on 6 April 1918, former "Z" Squadron of No. 2 Wing, RNAS was added to the strength. Renumbered No. 62 Wing and consisting of Nos. 478, 479 and 480 Flights, the squadron was given the task of maintaining raids on Turkish targets in Macedonia and Thrace, operating from islands in the Northern Aegean, officially adopting the 222 Squadron number plate on 14 September 1918. The squadron continued to carry out raids on Turkish targets in the Balkans until the end of the war, eventually disbanding on 27 February 1919.

=== In the Second World War ===
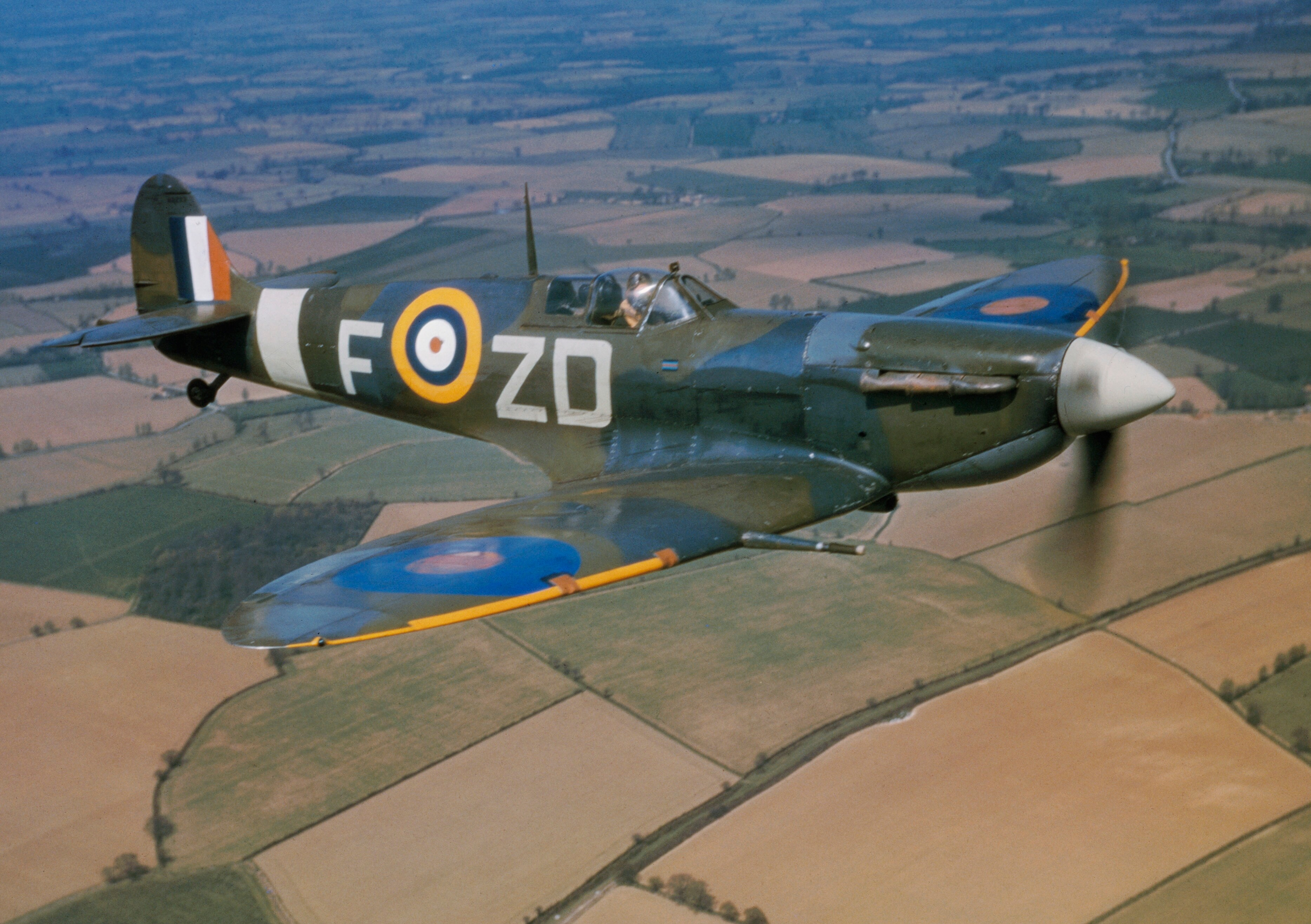
No. 222 Squadron Spitfire VB in 1942.

On 5 October 1939 No. 222 Squadron was reformed at RAF Duxford flying Bristol Blenheim IF's in the shipping protection role, but in March of the following year it re-equipped with Supermarine Spitfires and became a day-fighter unit. Douglas Bader became a flight leader on the squadron in the first half of 1940. It fought during the Battle of Britain, being based at RAF Hornchurch on 15 September 1940, under Squadron Leader "Johnnie" Hill. It later took part in Operation Jubilee, the 1942 Dieppe raid. In December 1944 the squadron converted to Hawker Tempests, which it flew until the squadron was recalled to the UK to re-equip with Gloster Meteors.

=== Entering the jet age ===
From October 1945 the squadron flew various marks of Meteors for nine years and later, after December 1954 Hawker Hunters, being part of Scotland's defence, but on 1 November 1957 No. 222 was disbanded.

=== On Rockets ===
In its last incarnation on 1 May 1960, No. 222 became a Bristol Bloodhound SAM unit at RAF Woodhall Spa, but after four years service in this role it disbanded on 30 June 1964.
