= No. 504 Squadron RAuxAF =

No. 504 (County of Nottingham) Squadron RAuxAF
- Active: 26 Mar 1928 – 10 Aug 1945; 10 May 1946 – 10 Mar 1957; 1 Oct 1999 – present
- Country: United Kingdom
- Branch: Royal Auxiliary Air Force
- Role: Logistics
- Part of: No 85 Expeditionary Logistics Wing, RAF A4 Force
- Current Station: RAF Wittering
- Nickname: County of Nottingham
- Mottos: Latin: Vindicat in Vetis (Translation: "It avenges in the wind")
- Post-1952 aircraft insignia
- Battle honours: France and Low Countries, 1940; Battle of Britain, 1940; Home Defence, 1940–42; Atlantic, 1941–42; Fortress Europe, 1942–44; Normandy, 1944; Arnhem, 1944; France and Germany, 1944–45. These honours are all emblazoned on the squadron standard

Commanders
- Honorary Air Commodores: Lord Sherwood (48–56); J.M. Birkin (56–57)
- Notable commanders: Sir H.M. Seely, MP; John Hamar "Johnnie" Hill; Herbert Hallowes

Insignia
- Squadron Badge heraldry: An oak tree fronted and eradicated The 'Major Oak' of Sherwood forest from the armorial bearings of the county of Nottingham, also thought to be appropriate for a Hurricane squadron
- Squadron Codes: AW (Apr 1939 – Sep 1939); TM (Sep 1939 – Aug 1945, 1949 – 1952); RAD (May 1946 – 1949)

No. 504 (County of Nottingham) Squadron was one of the Special Reserve Squadrons of the Auxiliary Air Force, and today is a reserve force of the RAF Regiment. It was integrated into the AAF proper in 1936. Based at RAF Cottesmore, Rutland, 504 Squadron used a variety of light bombers before being re-tasked to fighters with the Hawker Hurricane in 1939. It subsequently became a Fighter Squadron. Currently No. 504 Squadron no longer has a flying role, but as part of No 85 Expeditionary Logistics Wing of the RAF A4 Force.

== History ==
=== Formation and early years ===
No. 504 squadron was formed on 26 March 1928 at RAF Hucknall, Nottinghamshire as a Special Reserve Squadron in the day bomber role. As such it flew first with Hawker Horsleys, later with Westland Wallaces and Hawker Hinds. In the meantime, on 18 May 1936, the squadron had gone over to the Auxiliary Air Force and the next change for the squadron came on 31 October 1938, when it was transferred from RAF Bomber Command to RAF Fighter Command. After a short spell with Gloster Gauntlet biplane fighters the squadron received its first really modern aircraft as their next aircraft were to be Hawker Hurricane fighters.

=== In World War II ===
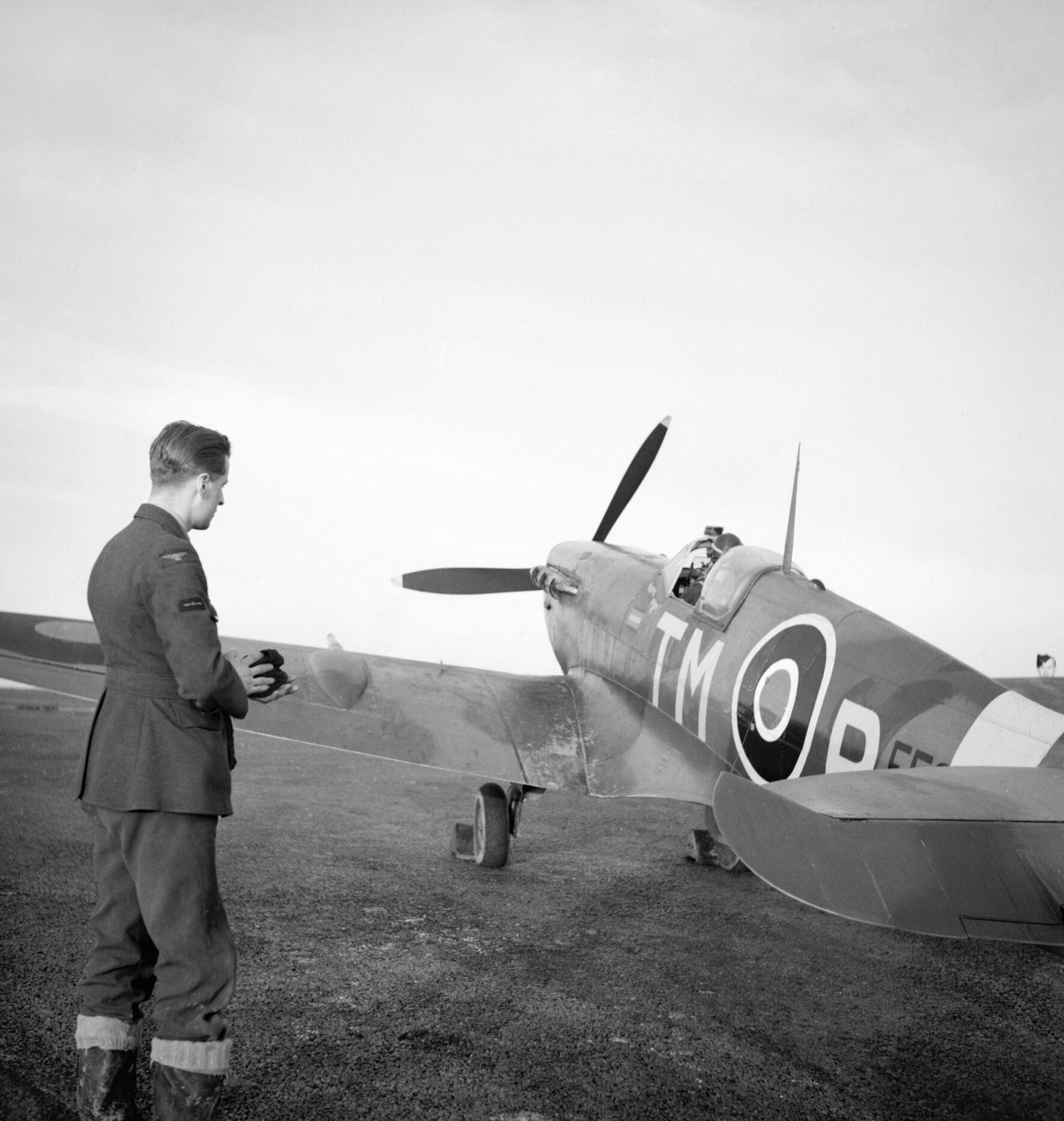
Squadron Spitfire

On 26 August 1939 the squadron was mobilised for active service as part of RAF Fighter Command and the Squadron was transferred to RAF Digby. In 1940 Squadron Leader ”Johnnie” Hill took command whilst the squadron was at Lille, France. When the airfield was overrun Hill had taken 12 Hurricanes into the air. Hill was shot down and shot at first by French peasants, and later by a British Army major who believed him to be a fifth columnist. On recovering from his injuries Hill was given command of 222 Squadron.

Throughout the Second World War, 504 Sqn operated from over some thirty airfields in both the UK and abroad. Roles were as diverse as Heavy Bomber escort; interdiction raids across occupied France; escort duties over Arnhem during Operation Market Garden and major involvement in the Battle of Britain. In March 1945 the Squadron was re-equipped with Gloster Meteor jets, but the war in Europe ended before they saw any action. It was re-numbered No. 245 Squadron on 10 August 1945.

=== Into the jet age ===
The Squadron was reformed at RAF Syerston on 10 May 1946 as a light bomber squadron. It was initially equipped with Mosquito T.3 training aircraft but in April 1947 it was re-designated a night fighter unit, receiving Mosquito NF.30s. Its role was changed once more again in May 1948, now to that of a day fighter unit. For this it received Spitfire F.22s, flying these until October 1949, when Meteor F.4s began to arrive to replace them. These were in their turn replaced by Meteor F.8s in March 1952. The squadron standard was presented on 3 March 1957 by Air Chief Marshal Sir Francis Fogarty, GBE, KCB, DFC, AFC and then laid up in St Mary's Church, Wymeswold, RAF Wymeswold having been the Squadron's last operational base. Seven days later the squadron, along with all other 19 flying units of the since 1947 Royal Auxiliary Air Force, disbanded.

==== Notable squadron members ====
Flight Lieutenant W.B. Royce of 504 Squadron became the first AAF pilot to be awarded the DFC, Sergeant Ray Holmes of 504 Squadron was forced to ram a Dornier bomber intent on attacking Buckingham Palace when his guns jammed during the attack. This event was immortalised in the film Battle of Britain. Famous rugby player and Russian prince Alexander Obolensky flew with 504 Squadron, dying in accident on 29 March 1940. It had many international pilots too, including Emile Jayawardena from Ceylon. Sergeant Pilot, later Squadron Leader, C. 'Wag' Haw, flew with 504 during the Battle of Britain before moving to 81 Sqn for deployment to Russia in August 1941 where he was awarded the Order of Lenin.

=== Current role ===
On 1 January 1998, the Offensive Support Role Support Squadron (OSRSS) was formed at RAF Cottesmore. This was then renamed 504 Squadron on 1 October 1999. On 1 October 2000 the reformation was celebrated with a march past in Nottingham. Although 504 Squadron no longer had a flying role, it remained an important part of the RAF. As part of an Operational Support Squadron (OSS), the first role of 504 Squadron was Force Protection (FP). To this end, approximately 60% of the personnel were RAF Regiment gunners providing ground defence for all assets on deployed operations. The remaining personnel were responsible for the many other duties including: Chemical, Biological, Radiological and Nuclear (CBRN) warning and reporting, airbase shelter marshalling and general sentry duties. Elements of the squadron deployed operationally to Afghanistan in these roles. During 2014, the squadron re-roled from FP to Logistics. As part of the RAF's No. 85 Expeditionary Logistics Wing (85 ELW) the Squadron is now based at RAF Wittering in Cambridgeshire and is recruiting personnel to train as Chefs, Drivers and Suppliers in support of deployed RAF units worldwide.

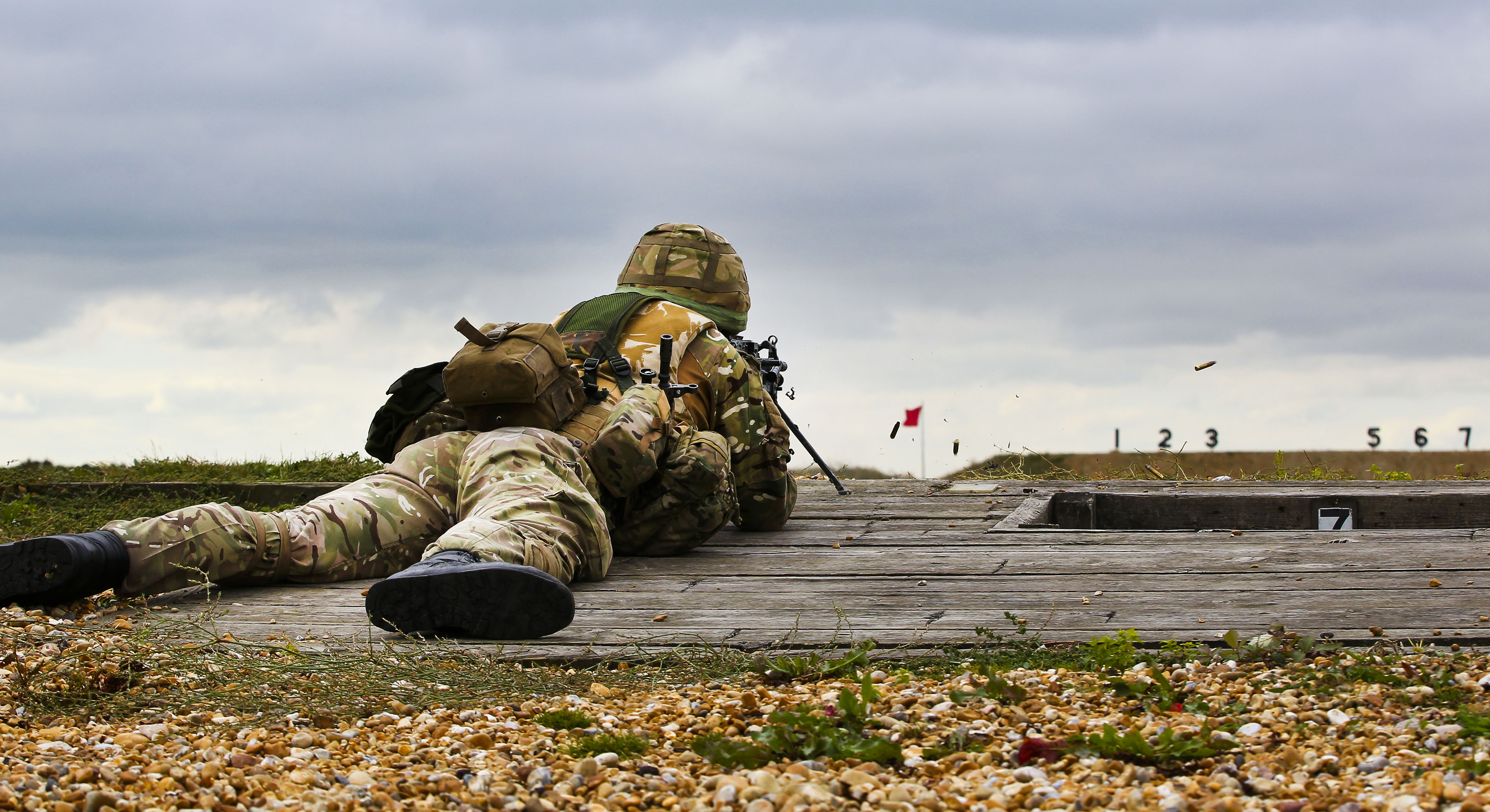
A reservist Gunner with 504 (County of Nottingham) Squadron, Royal Auxiliary Air Force fires a machine gun during two weeks Annual Continuous Training at Hythe Range Complex.

== Aircraft operated ==
Aircraft operated by no. 504 Squadron RAF, data from
From	To	Aircraft	Version
October 1929	March 1934	Hawker Horsley	
January 1934	June 1937	Westland Wallace	Mk.I
February 1935	June 1937	Westland Wallace	Mk.II
May 1937	November 1938	Hawker Hind	
November 1938	August 1939	Gloster Gauntlet	Mk.II
May 1939	July 1941	Hawker Hurricane	Mk.I
July 1941	November 1941	Hawker Hurricane	Mk.IIb
October 1941	February 1942	Supermarine Spitfire	Mk.IIa
December 1941	February 1942	Supermarine Spitfire	Mk.IIb
January 1942	January 1944	Supermarine Spitfire	Mk.Vb
October 1942	September 1943	Supermarine Spitfire	Mk.Vc
September 1943	January 1944	Supermarine Spitfire	Mk.VI
January 1944	March 1944	Supermarine Spitfire	Mk.IXb
March 1944	July 1944	Supermarine Spitfire	Mk.Vb
July 1944	April 1945	Supermarine Spitfire	Mk.IXe
April 1945	August 1945	Gloster Meteor	Mk.III
October 1946	July 1948	de Havilland Mosquito	T.3
April 1947	August 1948	de Havilland Mosquito	NF.30
May 1948	March 1950	Supermarine Spitfire	F.22
October 1949	March 1952	Gloster Meteor	F.4
February 1952	March 1957	Gloster Meteor	F.8

== Commanding officers ==
Officers commanding no. 504 Squadron RAF, data from
From	To	Name
October 1928		S/Ldr. C.M. Elliot-Smith, AFC
May 1936	September 1938	S/Ldr. Sir H.M. Seely, MP
September 1938	January 1940	S/Ldr. F.Y. Beamish
January 1940	May 1940	S/Ldr. H. Watson
May 1940	May 1940	S/Ldr. J. Parnall
May 1940	May 1940	S/Ldr. J.H. Hill
May 1940	May 1940	F/Lt. W.B. Royce, DFC
May 1940	March 1941	S/Ldr. J. Sample, DFC
March 1941	July 1941	S/Ldr. A.H. Hook, DFC, AFC
July 1941	February 1942	S/Ldr. P.T. Parsons
February 1942	January 1943	S/Ldr. R. Lewis
January 1943	March 1943	S/Ldr. J.I. Kilmartin, DFC
March 1943	July 1943	S/Ldr. R.C. Kilian
July 1943	October 1943	S/Ldr. P.J. Simpson, DFC
October 1943	March 1944	S/Ldr. H.J.L. Hallowes, DFC, DFM & Bar
March 1944	October 1944	S/Ldr. Banning-Lover
October 1944	August 1945	S/Ldr. M. Kellett
May 1946	1948	S/Ldr. A.H. Rook, DFC, AFC
1948	March 1950	S/Ldr. J.M. Birkin
March 1950	1954	S/Ldr. G.J. Beardsall
1954	March 1957	S/Ldr. P.I. Briggs, DFC

== See also ==
- List of Royal Air Force aircraft squadrons
