= No. 122 Squadron RAF =

Defunct flying squadron of the Royal Air Force

No. 122 (Bombay) Squadron RAF
- Active: 1 Jan 1918 – 20 Nov 1918; 1 May 1941 – 1 Apr 1946
- Country: United Kingdom
- Branch: Royal Air Force
- Nickname: Bombay
- Mottos: Latin: Victuri volamus ("We fly to conquer")

Insignia
- Squadron Badge heraldry: In front of a mullet a Leopard rampant. The mullet represents fighting in the heavens and the Leopard, a fierce fighter represents Bombay

No. 122 (Bombay) Squadron was a Royal Air Force fighter squadron during the First and Second World Wars.

== History ==
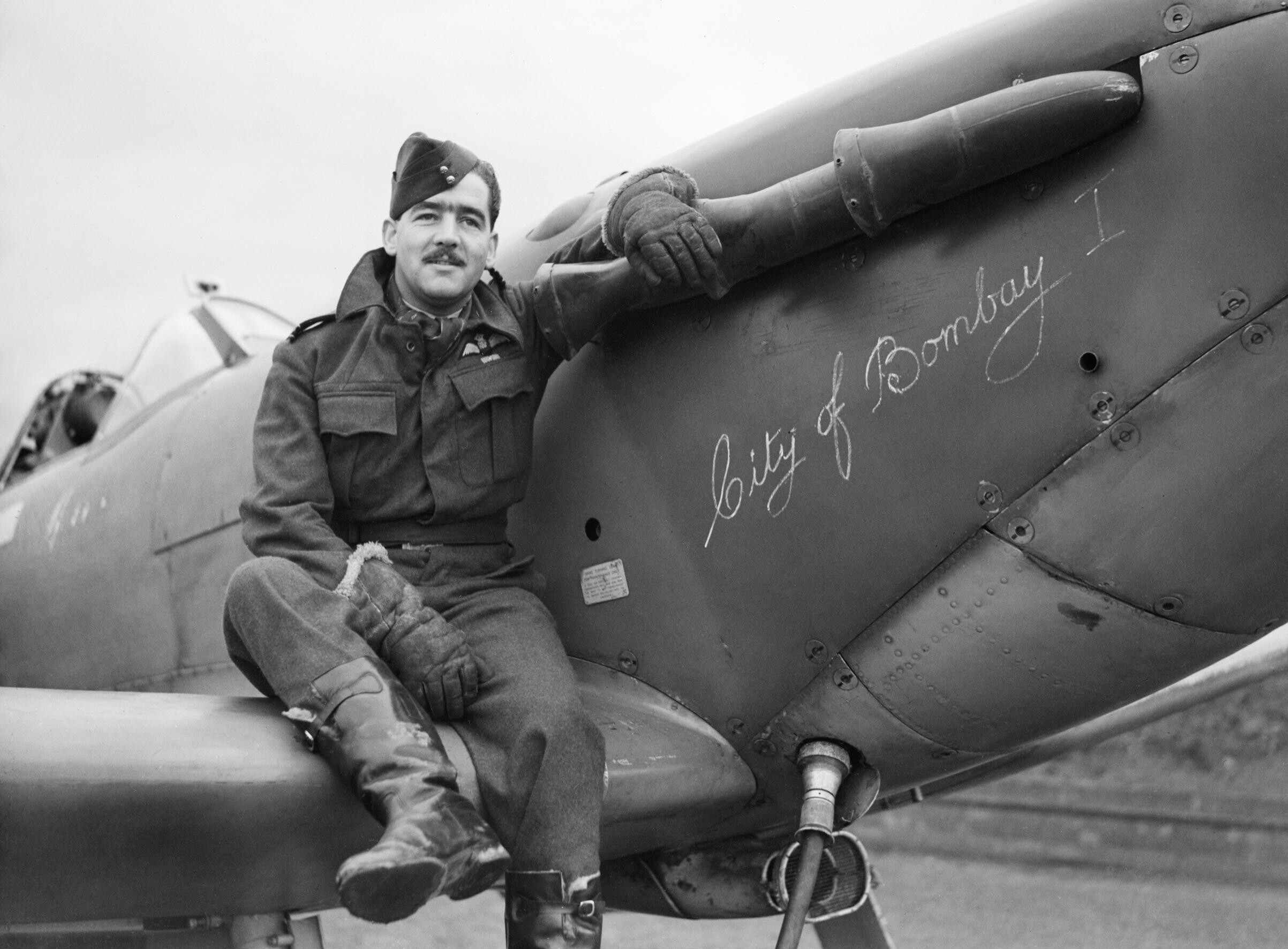
Squadron Leader H J L Hallowes, CO of No. 122 Squadron, with his Supermarine Spitfire Mk V at RAF Scorton in Yorkshire, December 1941

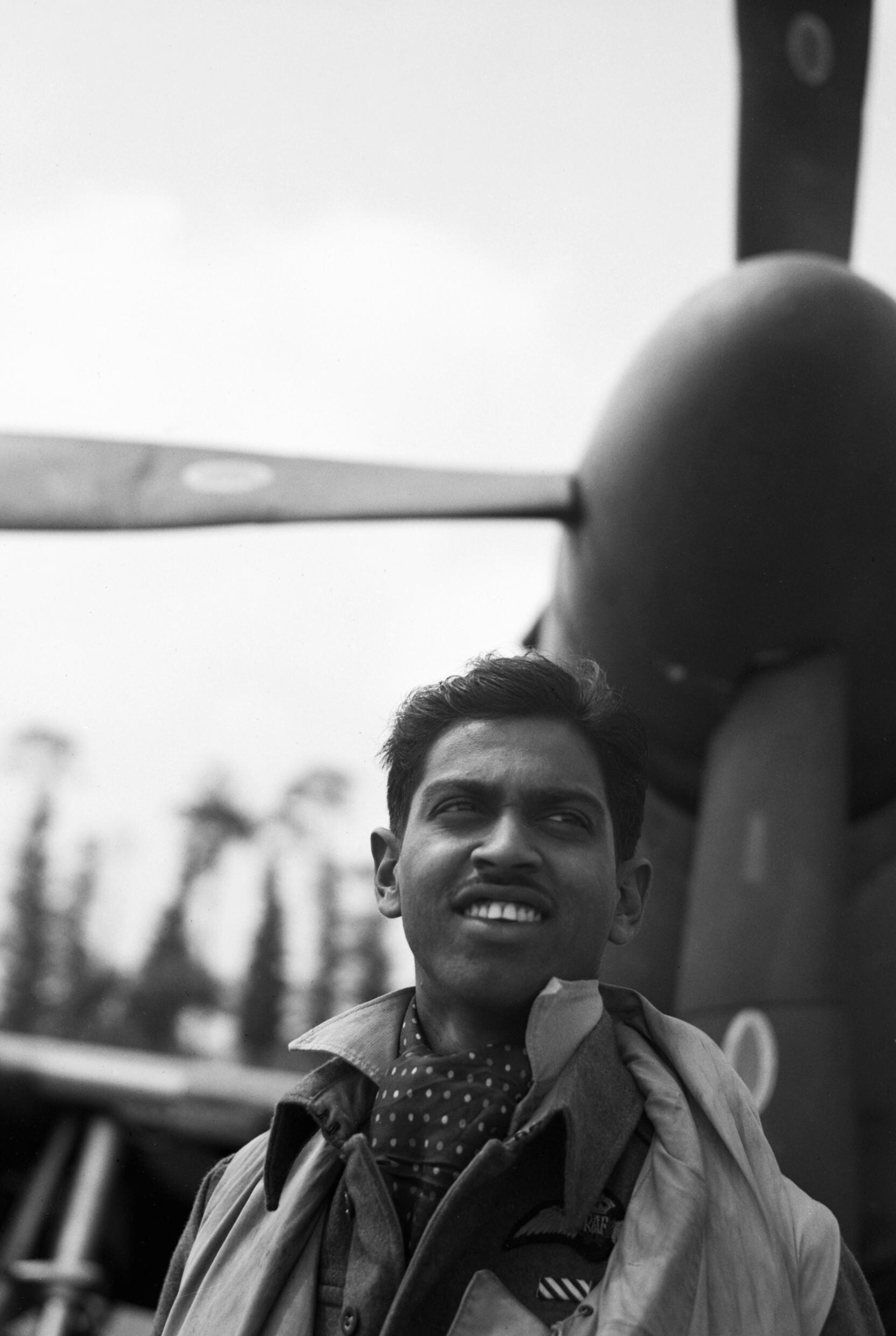
Flight Lieutenant C L F "Jimmy" Talalla, standing in front of his North American P-51 Mustang at Advanced landing ground B-12 Ellon, Normandy, 6 August 1944

The squadron was formed on 1 January 1918 at Sedgeford as a day bomber unit with the Airco DH.4, the intention was to train the squadron for operations on the de Havilland DH.9 but the squadron disbanded without seeing action on 17 August 1918. The squadron was reformed at RAF Upper Heyford in October 1918 with the intent to operate the de Havilland DH.10 but the Armistice was declared before the squadron had any aircraft and it was disbanded without being operational on 20 November 1918.

No. 122 was reformed in 1941 at RAF Turnhouse with the Supermarine Spitfire I to operate convoy patrols in the Firth of Forth, it soon moved south into England to become part of the Hornchurch Wing with cannon-equipped Spitfires and it flew sweeps over northern France and participated in the Dieppe operations. In 1942 František Fajtl became the squadron commander, the first Czech to lead an RAF squadron. In October 1942 it was reequipped with the Spitfire IX and continued operations over France.

In January 1944 it re-equipped with the North American Mustang to operate long-range bomber escort duties and it also attacked targets in France and the Low Countries. Within a few months the Mustangs were converted into fighter-bombers and the squadron started long-range ground-attack sorties into continental Europe. Under the command of Squadron Leader Ernest Joyce, it was heavily involved in D-Day operations and within a few weeks had moved to France to support the invasion. After three-months of intense operations the squadron was withdrawn to England and continued till the end of the war providing long-range escorts to both Bomber Command and the United States 8th Air Force.

After the end of the war the squadron was re-equipped with the Spitfire F21, but was disbanded at RAF Dalcross on 1 April 1946, then renumbered No. 41 Squadron.

== Aircraft operated ==
Dates	Aircraft	Variant	Notes
1941	Supermarine Spitfire	I	
1941–1942	Supermarine Spitfire	IIA and IIB	
1941–1942; 1943	Supermarine Spitfire	VB	
1942–1943; 1943–1944; 1945–1946	Supermarine Spitfire	IX	
1944–1945	North American Mustang	III	
1945	North American Mustang	IV	
1946	Supermarine Spitfire	F21	
