= Curchin =

Curchin is a surname. Notable people with the surname include:

- Jeff Curchin (1947–2011), American football player
- John Curchin (1918–1941), Australian flying ace
