= No. 609 Squadron RAuxAF =

No. 609 (West Riding) Squadron RAuxAF
- No. 609 RAuxAF Squadron Badge
- Active: 10 Feb 1936 – 15 Sep 1945; 31 Jul 1946 – 10 Mar 1957; 1 Jul 1998 – present
- Country: United Kingdom
- Branch: Royal Air Force
- Type: Air Force Infantry
- Role: Force Protection
- Part of: Royal Auxiliary Air Force
- Base: RAF Leeming
- Nickname: West Riding
- Motto: Tally Ho
- Engagements: Battle of Dunkirk; Battle of Britain; Normandy landing

Commanders
- Honorary Air Commodore: Geoffrey Ambler
- Notable commanders: Roland Beamont

Insignia
- Squadron Badge: In front of two hunting horns in saltire, a rose
- Post 1951 Squadron markings
- Squadron Codes: BL (Apr 1939 – Sep 1939); PR (Sep 1939 – Sep 1945 and 1949 – Apr 1951); RAP (May 1946 – 1949)

No. 609 (West Riding) Squadron of the Royal Auxiliary Air Force, originally formed as a bomber squadron and in the Second World War active as fighter squadron, nowadays provides personnel to augment and support the operations of the Royal Air Force. The squadron is no longer a flying squadron, but instead has the role of Force Protection. It is currently based at RAF Leeming, North Yorkshire.

== History ==
=== Formation and early history (1936–1939) ===
No. 609 Squadron was formed on 10 February 1936 at RAF Yeadon, now Leeds Bradford International Airport, as the ninth of the 21 flying squadrons of the Royal Auxiliary Air Force. In June of that year it received Hawker Hart light bomber aircraft, which gave way in December 1937 to Hawker Hinds. The first Commanding Officer of 609 Squadron was Squadron Leader Harald Peake, who later rose to the rank of Air Commodore. On 8 December 1938, 609 Squadron was transferred to RAF Fighter Command, but was not equipped with fighters until the introduction of the Supermarine Spitfire Mk.I in August 1939. At this point the squadron was still manned by part-time civilians. Fairey Battle light bombers were used as training aircraft to convert pilots from the fixed undercarriage biplane Hinds to much more modern monoplane Spitfire with its retractable undercarriage.

=== Second World War ===
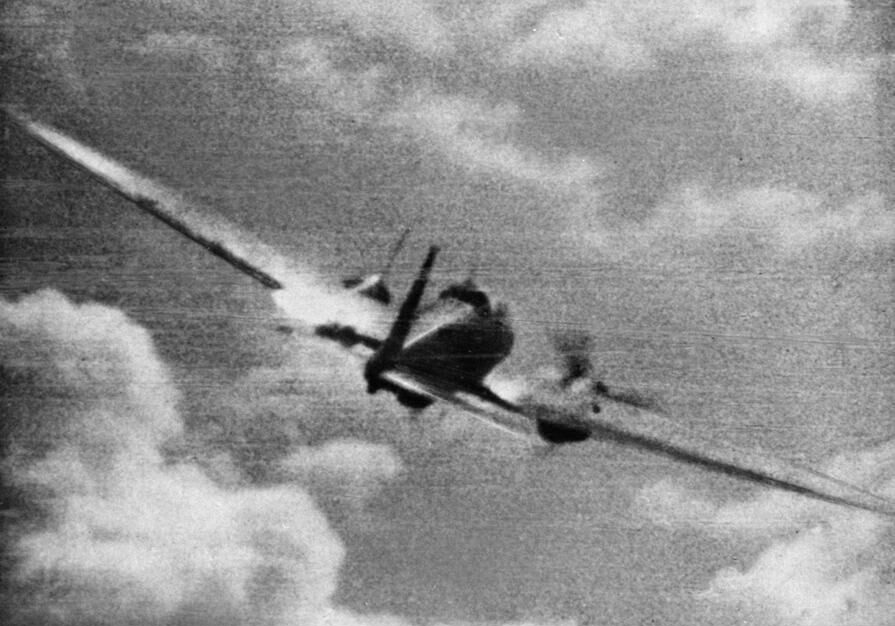
Still from camera gun footage taken from a Spitfire of No. 609 Squadron showing a Heinkel He 111 taking hits in the port engine on 25 September 1940.

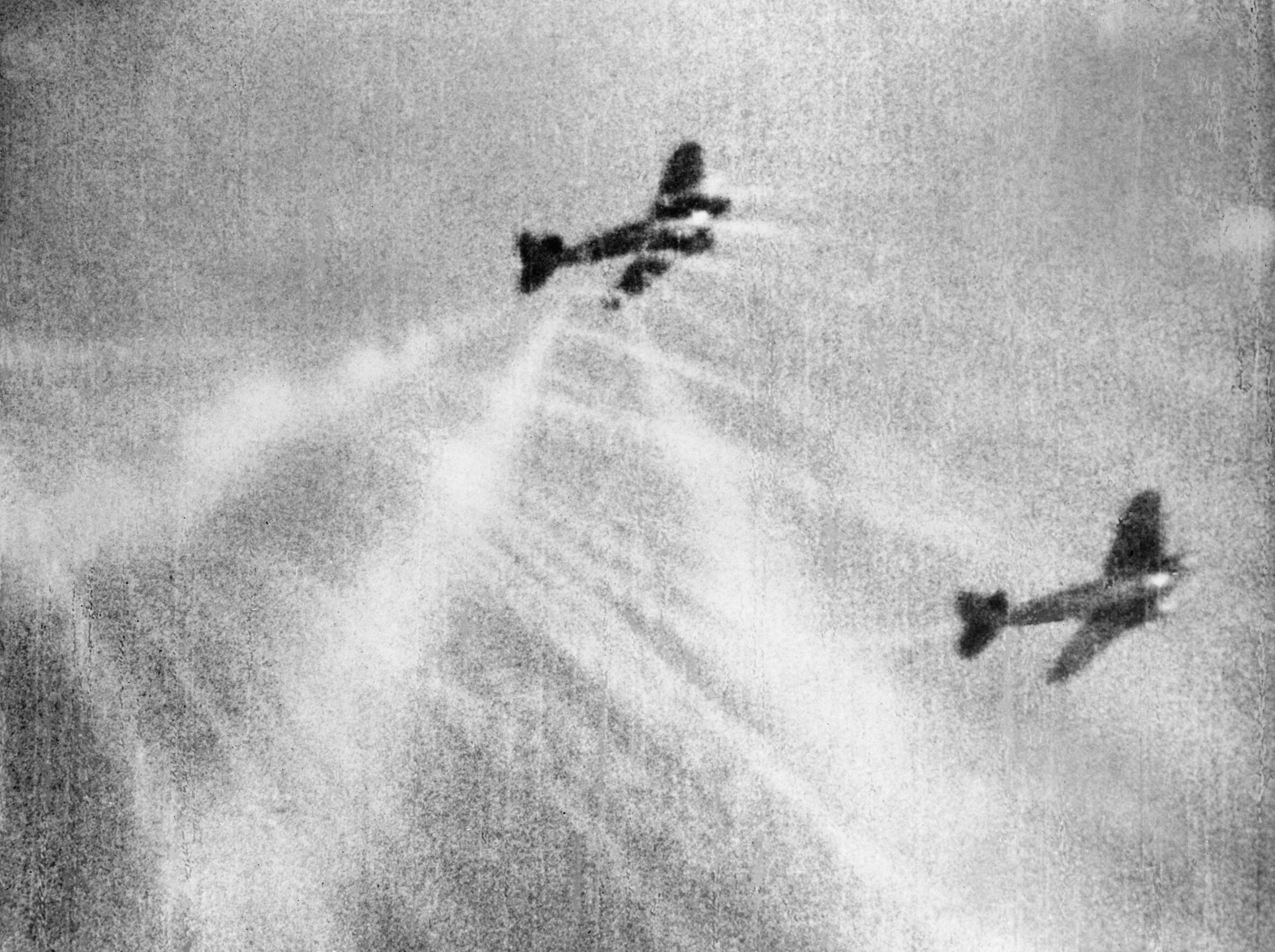
Gun camera film showing tracer ammunition from a Spitfire of 609 Squadron, hitting a Heinkel He 111

At the outbreak of war, the squadron was called up to full-time service and initially served on defensive duties in the North of England. In May 1940, the squadron moved to RAF Northolt and flew over the Battle of Dunkirk during Operation Dynamo. Around this period, one third of the squadron's pilots were lost over a period of three days.

During the Battle of Britain, 609 Squadron moved to RAF Middle Wallop as part of Fighter Command's efforts to defend the south coast of England, west of London. There was also an advanced flight based at RAF Warmwell. At this time, one third of the RAF's front-line squadrons were from the Royal Auxiliary Air Force. During August 1940 609 Squadron destroyed 46 enemy aircraft, however, by now almost all of the pre war auxiliary pilots were dead or missing. On 21 October 1940 the squadron became the first to achieve 100 confirmed enemy aircraft kills. Boasting 9 'aces', pilots F/L Frank Howell (8 confirmed kills), F/L John Dundas (9 confirmed kills), P/O David Moore Crook (6 confirmed kills) and P/O John Curchin (7 confirmed kills) were among several awarded the Distinguished Flying Cross for their efforts during the battle. A Spitfire that flew with 609 Squadron during this period, number X4590, is now preserved at the Royal Air Force Museum London, Hendon. Another 609 Squadron Spitfire, number R6915, is preserved in the Imperial War Museum, London. This aircraft scored victories while piloted both by John Dundas and another 609 Squadron ace, Noel Agazarian.

During February 1941 the squadron moved to RAF Biggin Hill. Almost all of the squadron's original pilots were now lost and replacements came from Belgium, Poland, Canada, Australia, France, United States, and New Zealand in addition to those from Britain. During the summer of 1941, 609 Squadron carried out fighter sweeps over France. In November 1941, the squadron was withdrawn from the front line, after 18 months continuous fighting and rested at RAF Digby in Lincolnshire.

While at Biggin Hill, the squadron acquired a goat, soon named William, which became their official mascot. He was awarded an honorary DSO and DFC, and the rank of Air Commodore.

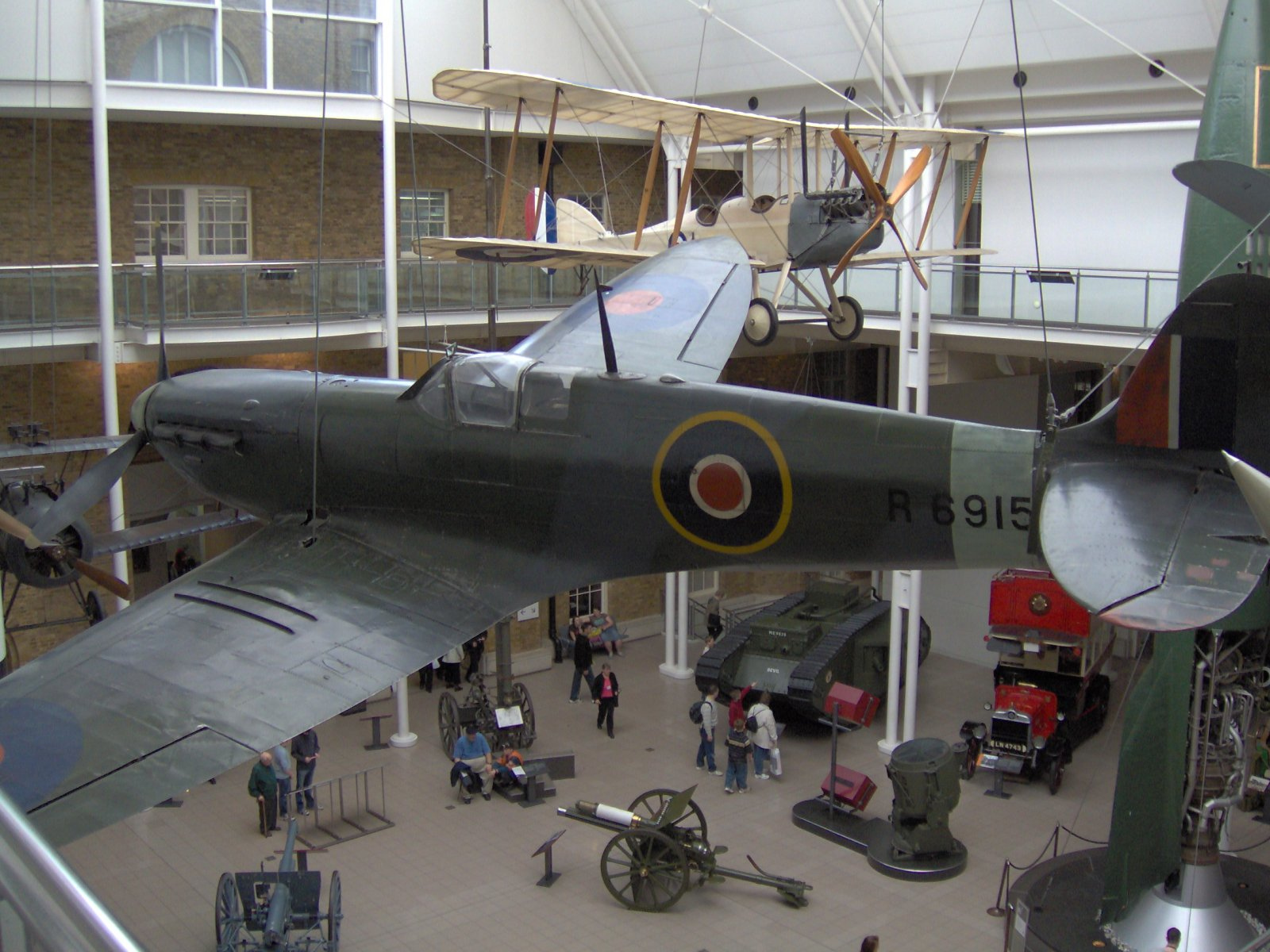
Spitfire R6915, Imperial War Museum (2005)

In spring 1942 the squadron moved to RAF Duxford and re-equipped with the Spitfire Mk V. The squadron soon began to replace these with the Hawker Typhoon, which was introduced in an attempt to counter the Luftwaffe's Focke-Wulf Fw 190 fighter. It became apparent that the Typhoon was better suited for low level attacks against ground targets, such as airfields and armoured vehicles. Before this change of focus, 609 Squadron had become the top scoring squadron in the RAF for the period of early 1943. They were the first Typhoon squadron to achieve 200 kills. The squadron also gained new pilots, including the first German citizen to fly with the RAF, Film Production Designer Sir Ken Adam. He and his brother Dennis were the first German-born pilots in the RAF, Dennis joining No. 183 Squadron in 1944, as part of the same Wing (No. 123) that his elder brother was flying in with No. 609 (West Riding) Squadron.

Prior to the allied invasion of Europe in 1944, 609 Squadron was involved with destroying German radar stations on the French coast. In support of the invasion, the squadron's Typhoons were deployed against tanks and other targets using "60lb" RP-3 rockets. The Typhoon proved itself adept at the role of 'tankbuster' and went on to attack the German armoured breakthrough at the Falaise Gap in August 1944. In November 1944 the squadron moved to the Netherlands, followed in April 1945 by a move over the enemy border to Plantlunne, Germany. On some days the squadron flew up to 150 sorties. By the end of the war 603 pilots had claimed some 232 kills for 73 aircrew killed in action.

=== Post-war period (1945–1957) ===
After the war, 609 Squadron was stood down, and the name transferred back to the Royal Auxiliary Air Force. In 1946, the squadron reformed at RAF Church Fenton, then moved back to Yeadon. 609 was once again a squadron manned by part-time civilians using front line fighters, this time the Mosquito NF.30 night-fighter and later, when the squadron changed role to that of a daylight fighter squadron, the Spitfire LF.16. In 1951, 609 Squadron re-equipped with jet fighter aircraft, the Gloster Meteor, and moved back to Church Fenton in order to take advantage of the longer runway. At this time, 19 regular squadrons and 10 reserve squadrons of Meteors formed Britains main fighter defence. During the Korean War, 609 and other auxiliary squadrons were called up to full-time service for 3 months.

From 1947 to March 1957 (when all flying squadrons of the Royal Auxiliary Air Force were disbanded), Air Vice-Marshal Geoffrey Ambler, who commanded the squadron just before the Second World War, was the squadron's Honorary Air Commodore. An active 609 Squadron Association was formed after the War and for 21 years was organised by Charles 'Mac' McConnell who had served as an officer during the War. The Association played the lead role in establishing the squadron museum near York.

=== The modern era (2000–present day) ===
The latest incarnation of the squadron was formed at RAF Leeming on 1 July 1998 and was originally named the Air Defence Support Squadron, the 609 number plate was granted on 1 October 1999. The squadron is no longer a flying Squadron, but instead has the role of Force Protection, it is employed to prevent or minimise the effects of enemy attack on RAF bases. The squadron deployed to Ali Al Salem as part of Operation Telic from February to August 2003. Furthermore, 15 personnel from the squadron were deployed to Al Udeid Air Base, Qatar. Over 50 of the squadrons' reservists were awarded the Iraq Medal. Since then, several squadron members have deployed with regular RAF Regiment squadrons on operations in Iraq and Afghanistan. Currently the squadron have another role in C-UAS (Counter Uncrewed Air Systems). The squadron now have a number of trained personnel to deploy and utilise these skills in the modern theatre.

== 609 Squadron in art ==
Due to the exploits of 609 Squadron during the Second World War, its aircraft have been depicted in a number of paintings. These include:

- Southern Patrol, by Philip West, showing both 609 and 152 Squadron patrolling over the south coast of England.
- Spitfire Tally-Ho, by Geoffrey Lea (note that Tally-Ho is the Squadron motto).
- Supermarine Spitfire Mk I, by Philip West.
- Into the blue, by Simon Atack.
- Height of the Battle, by Geoff Nutkins. Showing John Dundas & Red Tobin in combat.
- Lone Patrol, by John Young. Showing Spifire Mk I, X4590 the aircraft now preserved at the RAF Museum, Hendon.
- 609 Squadron's 200th, by Geoff Nutkins.
- Typhoon Scramble, by Richard Taylor.
- Typhoon Attack, by Robert Taylor.
- Double Trouble, by Geoff Nutkins.
- Sorbo Leader Attacking, by Alex Hamilton. Showing Pilot Officer N.Le C.Agazarian in Spitfire PR-U R6915.
- Battle above the Clouds, by Geoff Nutkins. Showing John Dundas shooting down German ace Helmut Wick.

== Aircraft operated ==
Aircraft operated by no. 609 Squadron RAF, data from
From	To	Aircraft	Version
June 1936	January 1938	Hawker Hart	
January 1938	August 1939	Hawker Hind	
August 1939	May 1941	Supermarine Spitfire	Mk.I
February 1941	May 1941	Supermarine Spitfire	Mk.IIa
May 1941	May 1942	Supermarine Spitfire	Mks.Vb, Vc
April 1942	1942	Hawker Typhoon	Mk.Ia
May 1942	September 1945	Hawker Typhoon	Mk.Ib
July 1946	April 1948	de Havilland Mosquito	NF.30
April 1948	February 1951	Supermarine Spitfire	LF.16e
November 1950	January 1951	de Havilland Vampire	FB.5
January 1951	July 1951	Gloster Meteor	F.4
June 1951	February 1957	Gloster Meteor	F.8

== Commanding officers ==
Officers commanding no. 609 Squadron RAF, data from
From	To	Name
10 February 1936	8 December 1938	Sqn Ldr H. Peake
8 December 1938	28 December 1939	S/Ldr. G.H. Ambler, AFC
28 December 1939	28 June 1940	S/Ldr. M.T. Avent
28 June 1940	4 October 1940	S/Ldr. H.S. Darley, DSO
4 October 1940	29 July 1941	S/Ldr. M.L. Robinson, DSO, DFC
29 July 1941	1 June 1942	S/Ldr. G.K. Gilroy, DSO, DFC & Bar
1 June 1942	30 October 1942	S/Ldr. P.H.M. Richey, DFC & Bar
30 October 1942	5 May 1943	S/Ldr. R.P. Beamont, DSO, DFC & Bar
5 May 1943	18 August 1943	S/Ldr. A. Ingle, DFC, AFC
18 August 1943	29 December 1943	S/Ldr. P.G. Thornton-Brown, DFC
29 December 1943	30 June 1944	S/Ldr. J.C. Wells, DFC
30 June 1944	14 August 1944	S/Ldr. L.E.J.M. Geerts, DFC
14 August 1944	17 September 1944	S/Ldr. R.A. Lallemant, DFC & Bar
17 September 1944	14 November 1944	S/Ldr. T.Y. Wallace, DFM
14 November 1944	6 December 1944	S/Ldr. C.J.G. "Windmill" Demoulin, DFC
6 December 1944	16 March 1945	S/Ldr. E.R.A. Roberts, DFC
16 March 1945	15 September 1945	S/Ldr. L.W.F. Stark, DFC & Bar, AFC
10 May 1946	January 1950	S/Ldr. P.H. Womersley, DFC & Bar
January 1950	December 1953	S/Ldr. A. Hudson, DFC, AFC
December 1953	January 1956	S/Ldr. E.T. Evans
January 1956	10 March 1957	S/Ldr. D. Shaw

== See also ==
- List of Royal Air Force aircraft squadrons
