= Alec Ingle =

British World War II flying ace

- Born: 6 February 1916; Louth, Lincolnshire, England
- Died: September 1999 (aged 83)
- Military career
- Allegiance: United Kingdom
- Branch: Royal Air Force
- Service years: 1939–1966
- Rank: Group Captain
- Commands: No. 124 Wing; No. 609 Squadron
- Conflicts: Second World War: Battle of Britain

Alec Ingle (6 February 1916 – September 1999) was a British fighter pilot who served with the Royal Air Force (RAF) during the Second World War. He is credited with destroying at least two, possibly as many as five, aircraft.

From Louth in Lincolnshire, Ingle was a member of the Royal Air Force Volunteer Reserve when he was called up to serve in the RAF on the outbreak of the Second World War. Once his training was completed in June 1940 he was posted to No. 605 Squadron. He flew Hawker Hurricane fighters during the Battle of Britain, claiming a number of aerial victories. He was wounded towards the end of the year and performed instructing duties once he was recovered from his wounds. In May 1943 he returned to operations as commander of No. 609 Squadron. Three months later he was given command of No. 124 Wing. He was shot down during a sortie over France on 11 September and went into captivity as a prisoner of war until the end of hostilities in Europe. He remained in the RAF in the postwar period, eventually retiring in 1966 in the rank of group captain. He died in September 1999, aged 83.

== Early life ==
Alec Ingle was born in Louth, in Lincolnshire, England, on 6 February 1916. Educated at Pocklington School, he enlisted in the Royal Air Force Volunteer Reserve in June 1937 and trained as a pilot at No. 4 Elementary and Reserve Flying Training School at Brough Aerodrome.

== Second World War ==
Called up for service with the Royal Air Force (RAF) on the outbreak of war, Ingle trained at No. 14 Flying Training School at Kinloss. Once this was completed in mid-June 1940, he was posted to No. 605 Squadron as a pilot officer, having been commissioned. The squadron, which operated Hawker Hurricane fighters was based at Drem, where it was resting and re-equipping after its involvement in the campaign in France. Ingle first saw action on 15 August, when the squadron was scrambled to take part in the interception of the Luftflotte 5 raid that targeted the northeast of England that day.

=== Battle of Britain ===
No. 605 Sqadron moved to Croydon, in the southeast of England, on 7 September, just as the Luftwaffe commenced its bombing campaign on London. The next day, as part of a scramble to intercept several approaching bombers, Ingle probably destroyed a Dornier Do 17 medium bomber in the vicinity of Maidstone. A Messerschmitt Bf 109 fighter was shot down near Dungeness on 12 October by Ingle. He claimed a Bf 109 fighter as probably destroyed near Mayfield on 26 October. However the Bf 109 subsequently ditched into the English Channel and its pilot, Werner Kauff, was rescued by a Luftwaffe Heinkel He 59 floatplane. The next day he again claimed a Bf 109 as probably destroyed, this time near Dover, although he had to make a crash landing due to his own Hurricane being damaged during an engagement with German fighters.

On 8 November Ingle, now commanding one of No. 605 Squadron's flights, damaged a Bf 109 near Maidstone. On 11 November he shot down a Bf 109 over Rochester; the pilot baled out to became a prisoner of war. On 1 December he had to bale out of his Hurricane over Hollingbourne as a result of damage from an engagement with Bf 109s. Wounded during this encounter, he was taken off operations.

After a period of recuperation, Ingle was posted to No. 59 Operational Training Unit at Crosby-on-Eden in July 1941. By this time, his substantive rank was flying officer, having been promoted the previous month. He was promoted to flight lieutenant in January 1942 and was awarded the Air Force Cross in the 1943 New Year Honours.

=== Squadron command ===
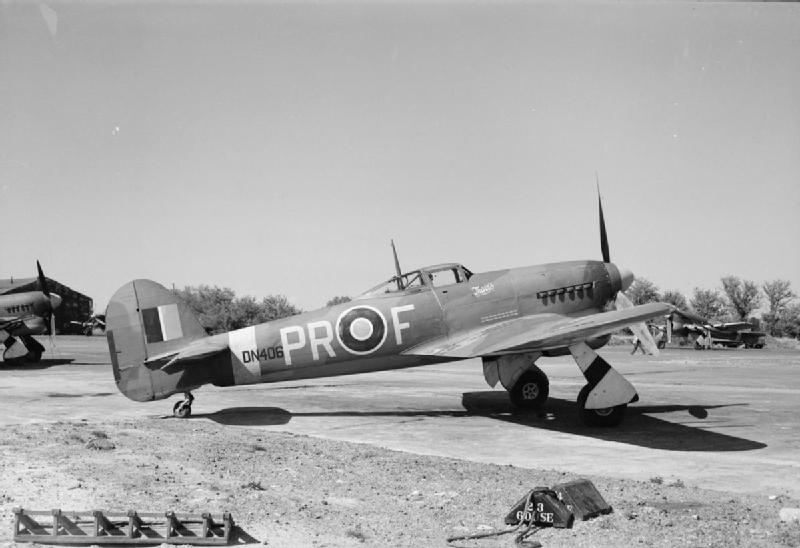
A Hawker Typhoon fighter of No. 609 Squadron at Manston

In May, and now an acting squadron leader, Ingle was appointed commander of No. 609 Squadron. This was based at Manston and, equipped with the Hawker Typhoon fighter, tasked with day- and night-time intruder sorties to German-occupied Europe. Under Ingle's supervision, the squadron commenced anti-shipping sorties into Dutch waters. These operations were successful with many ships damaged although carried some risk; Ingle himself was fortunate to return to Manston on one occasion as his Typhoon had been set on fire during an attack. In late July, No. 609 Squadron relocated to Matlaske where the engines of its Typhoons were to be overhauled but still performed intruder missions during this time. Ingle's successes over the preceding months were recognised with an award of the Distinguished Flying Cross (DFC) in early August. The citation, published in The London Gazette, read:

This officer has completed many sorties. By his exceptional skill and leadership he has contributed in a large measure to the successes obtained by the squadron which, within recent weeks, has damaged some 15 ships. Squadron Leader Ingle, who has destroyed 5 enemy aircraft has rendered fine service.

— London Gazette, No. 36135, 17 August 1943

Later in August, Ingle was promoted to acting wing commander and appointed wing leader of No. 124 Wing. This was part of the Second Tactical Air Force and carried out intruder missions to France. Leading a low-level attack on an airfield at Beauvais-Tillé, Focke Wulf 190 fighters intercepted and damaged his Typhoon. It exploded in mid-air and threw Ingle, badly burnt, out at 300 feet (91 m). His parachute opened in time for him land on the ground. He evaded capture for a few hours but the extent of his injuries saw him surrender to the Germans. He spent the remainder of the war confined firstly in the Stalag Luft III prisoner of war camp, and latterly in Stalag Luft I. Although the Soviet Army liberated the camp in May 1945, it was several weeks before the freed prisoners were repatriated to the United Kingdom.

== Postwar career ==
Ingle opted to remain in the RAF in the postwar period, securing a permanent commission as a flight lieutenant with effect from September 1945 although he retained his wartime acting rank of squadron leader. He initially commanded the RAF station at West Malling from late 1945 into early 1946 and then took up a similar post at Tangmere. He went to RAF Staff College in 1947 after which he went to a staff post at the Officer's Advanced Training School at Hornchurch. In 1949 he was appointed an administrative officer at Tangmere and then, promoted to wing commander, took command of RAF Eindhoven in Holland. He later served in Singapore as the Deputy Head of Far East Secretariat, then in the Foreign Office as an intelligence officer. During his service in the latter appointment, he was promoted to group captain.

In 1962 Ingle was appointed Deputy Director of Air Staff Plans and Policies at the Air Ministry. He was part of a parade of Battle of Britain fighter pilots in the main funeral cortège for Winston Churchill at St. Paul's Cathedral on 30 January 1965. He retired from the RAF the following year, on 6 May.

== Later life ==
In his retirement Ingle advocated for reimbursement of deductions made to the pay of British military personnel who had spent a portion of their war service as prisoners of war, and made submissions to the British Government during the 1990s. Ingle settled on the south coast of England in his later years and died in September 1999.

Although Ingle's DFC citation notes he destroyed five aircraft, aviation historians Christopher Shores and Clive Williams suggest he was responsible for two aircraft destroyed, three probably destroyed and one damaged.
