= Paul Richey =

British flying ace of WWII

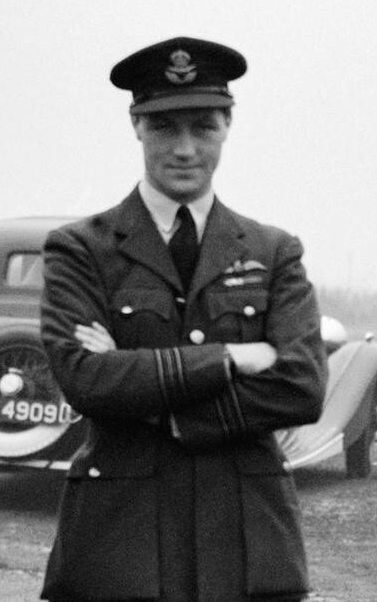
- Richey, 1942
- Born: 7 May 1916; Chelsea, London, United Kingdom
- Died: 23 February 1989 (aged 72)
- Relatives: Michael Richey (brother); Michael Robinson (brother-in-law)
- Military career
- Allegiance: United Kingdom
- Branch: Royal Air Force; Royal Auxiliary Air Force
- Service years: 1937–1946 (RAF); 1948–1958 (RAuxAF)
- Rank: Wing Commander
- Commands: No. 74 Squadron; No. 609 Squadron; No. 189 Wing; No. 601 Squadron
- Conflicts: Second World War: Battle of France; Circus offensive; Operation Jubilee
- Awards: Distinguished Flying Cross & Bar; Chevalier of the Legion of Honour (France); Officer in the Order of the Crown (Belgium); Croix de Guerre (Belgium); Croix de Guerre with bronze palm (France); Royal Humane Society Bronze Medal

Paul Richey, DFC & Bar (7 May 1916 – 23 February 1989) was a flying ace who served in the Royal Air Force (RAF) during the Second World War. He was credited with having shot down at least ten aircraft. He also wrote a well received book, Fighter Pilot, covering No. 1 Squadron's involvement in the Battle of France.

Born in Chelsea, Richey joined the RAF in 1937 and once his training was completed was posted to No. 1 Squadron. Sent to France on the outbreak of the Second World War, he flew extensively during the Battle of France and achieved several aerial victories until he was wounded in action. Repatriated to the United Kingdom, after a period of service as a fighter controller and then an instructor, he returned to operational flying in April 1941 with a posting to No. 609 Squadron. Flying on sorties to occupied France during the Circus offensive, he shot down several more aircraft. Later in the year he briefly commanded No. 74 Squadron. His account of No. 1 Squadron's service during the Battle of France was published in mid-1941 as Fighter Pilot. It sold well and brought Richey to the attention of Air Marshal Sir William Sholto-Douglas, who arranged a posting to the headquarters of Fighter Command. In early 1942 Richey was sent to No. 56 Squadron to fly as a supernumerary pilot, and later in the year became commander of his former unit, No. 609 Squadron. In October he was promoted to wing commander and sent to British India. He commanded No. 189 Wing in the Imphal Valley for several months before being repatriated to the United Kingdom in February 1944 for health reasons. He served in staff postings for the remainder of the war.

In the postwar period, Richey worked in the petroleum industry and then as an aviation correspondent. He returned to military service in 1948, joining the Royal Auxiliary Air Force and soon commanding No. 601 Squadron. He retired from the military in 1958. A recipient of a bravery award the following year for rescuing a woman from drowning, he spent much of the remainder of his life in France. He died in 1989, aged 72. An incomplete manuscript of his wartime experiences following the Battle of France was found among his papers and, finished by Norman Franks, was published in 1993 as Fighter Pilot's Summer.

== Early life ==
Paul Henry Mills Richey was born on 7 May 1916 in the United Kingdom, in the London suburb of Chelsea. Portions of his childhood were spent abroad; firstly in Albania where his father, George Richey, a former British Army officer, was involved in the training of the police force there, and then at a boarding school in Switzerland. He also went to school at Downside School in Bath where one of his fellow pupils was the future flying ace Michael Robinson. Once his schooling was completed, he joined the Royal Air Force (RAF) on a short service commission in March 1937. His commission as an acting pilot officer was granted on 18 May.

After Richey's flight training was completed, he was posted to No. 1 Squadron in 1938. At the time of his posting, the squadron was based at Tangmere and operated the Hawker Hurricane fighter.

== Second World War ==
On the outbreak of the Second World War, No. 1 Squadron was deployed to France as part of the Advanced Air Striking Force. By October it was operating from Vassincourt and patrolling the French-German border, occasionally engaging the Luftwaffe, although Richey made no claims during this time. He was promoted to flying officer on 4 January 1940. On 29 March, Richey achieved his first aerial victory, destroying a Messerschmitt Bf 109 fighter near Saarburg.

=== Battle of France ===
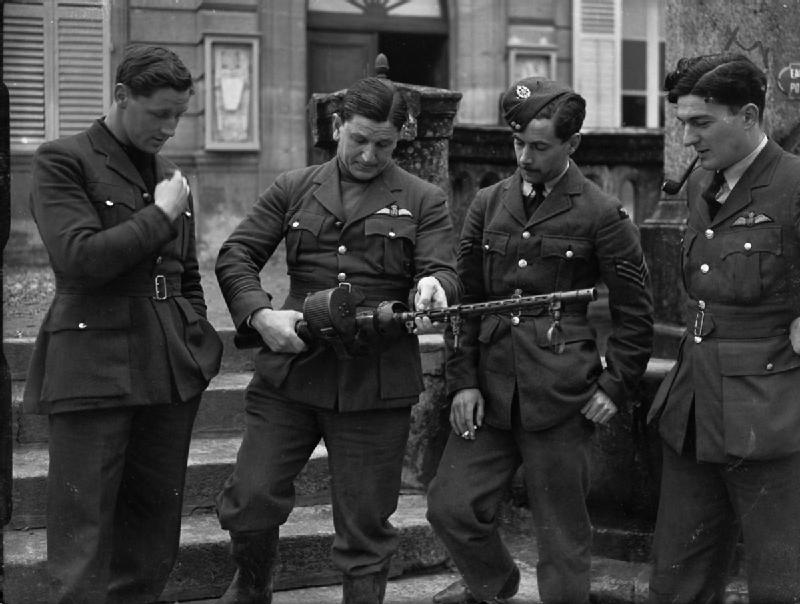
Pilots of No. 1 Squadron inspect a German machine gun outside the officer's mess at their airfield at Vassincourt; Richey stands on the left

When the German invasion of France commenced on 10 May, No. 1 Squadron was heavily engaged and over the following weeks began to retreat, repeatedly shifting from airfield to airfield. Richey shared in the destruction of a Dornier Do 17 medium bomber over Longwy on the opening day of the invasion and this was followed on 11 May with his shooting down of a pair of Messerschmitt Bf 110 heavy fighters near Brunehamel. He had earlier in the day claimed a Do 17 as destroyed but this was not verified. Shot down the same day, he was able to quickly rejoin his squadron. He destroyed two more Bf 110s on 15 May but again was subsequently shot down later in the day. Once more making his way back to his unit, he resumed flying duties.

On 19 May Richey intercepted and destroyed three Heinkel He 111 medium bombers near Château-Thierry but was wounded by the defensive armament of one or more of the bombers that he had targeted. He survived the subsequent crash-landing of his Hurricane and was repatriated to the United Kingdom for medical treatment.

Once Richey had recovered from his wounds, he was posted to the RAF station at Middle Wallop as a fighter controller where he remained for three months. He was then sent to Aston Down to serve as an instructor at No. 55 Operational Training Unit. During this time, he was awarded the Distinguished Flying Cross. He was unhappy at the posting, desiring a return to operational flying and eventually this was granted, with an assignment to No. 609 Squadron in early April 1941. This was equipped with Supermarine Spitfire Mk II fighters, soon to be updated to Spitfire Mk Vbs, and based at Biggin Hill. It had a high proportion of Belgians as flying personnel. His former schoolmate, Michael Robinson, was commander of the unit. Richey, who was by this time married to Robinson's sister, was a flight commander in the squadron. He had been promoted to flight lieutenant earlier in the year.

=== Circus offensive ===
No. 609 Squadron was involved in Fighter Command's Circus offensive, regularly flying sweeps as part of the Biggin Hill wing to France to draw out Luftwaffe fighters and to escort bombers. Richey's first claim with his new squadron was on 27 June, when he was credited with damaging a Bf 109 to the south of Dunkirk. Three days later he shot down a Bf 109 over Nieppe Forest and with Pilot Officer Roger Malengreau, a Belgian flying with the squadron, shared in the probable destruction of another, near Saint-Omer. He was separated from the rest of the squadron in the engagement and flew back to the United Kingdom on his own, flying low level most of the way.

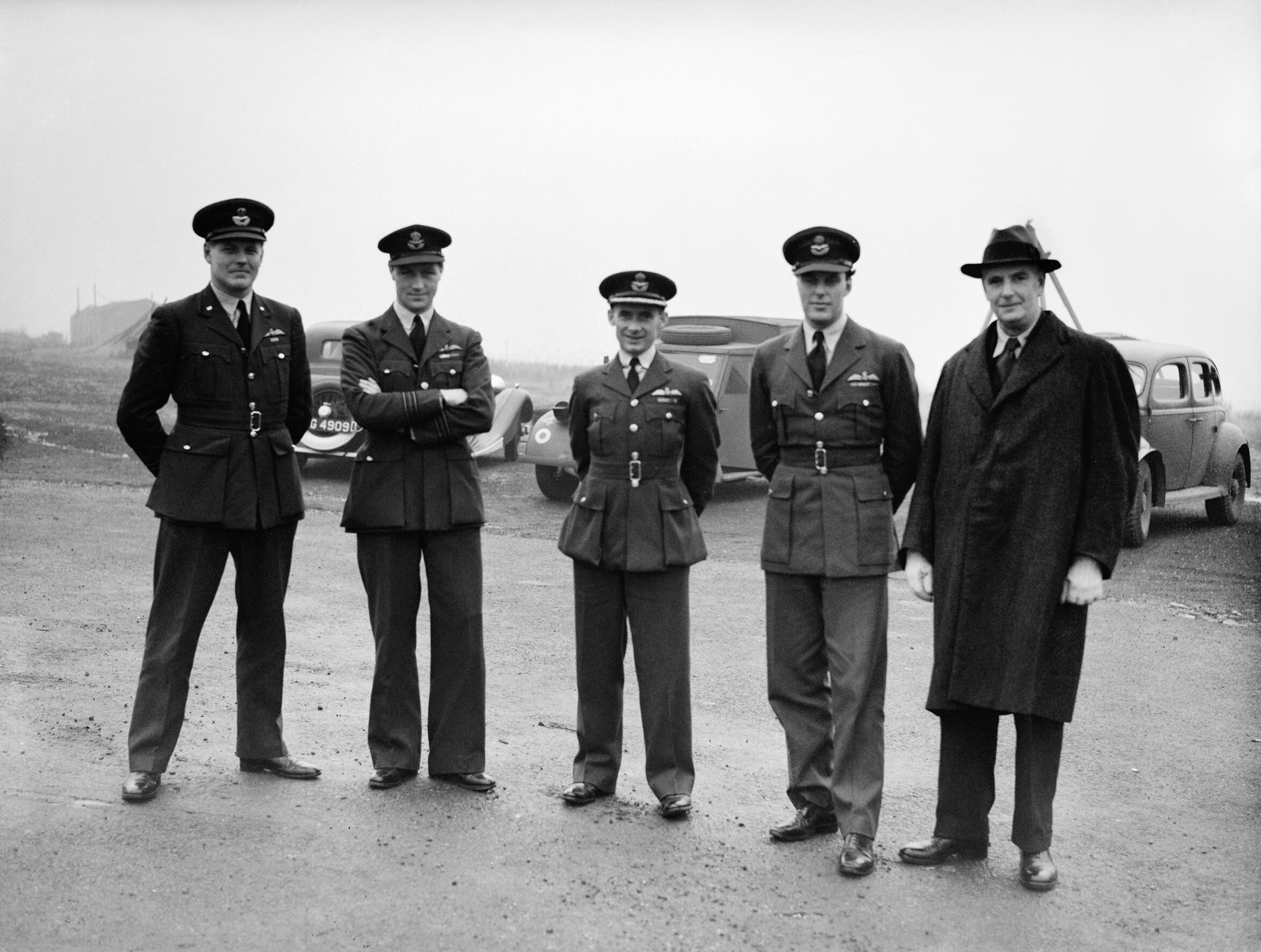
In a photograph taken on the occasion of the presentation of No. 609 Squadron's crest, Richey stands second left in this group; his brother-in-law, Michael Robinson, stands second right

Richey was credited with damaging a pair of Bf 109s on 4 July, again near Saint-Omer, and on 10 July, damaged another Bf 109 in the same area. On this occasion, the squadron was providing cover for a group of Short Stirling heavy bombers attacking a power station at Chocques. The next day, he probably destroyed a Bf 109 and damaged two others, all near Dunkirk. In an engagement close to Nieppe Forest on 23 July, he shot down a Bf 109, which was his final aerial victory. On 7 August, the Biggin Hill wing was heavily engaged with Bf 109s over Saint-Omer and Richey's Spitfire was badly damaged, losing all its coolant. Despite this, he was able to return to the United Kingdom, making a crash landing at Manston. Richey subsequently wrote a report with recommendations for tactical improvements in the handling of Spitfires which was forwarded to No. 11 Group for consideration. Later in August he was posted to No. 74 Squadron as its commander. By this time, he had been awarded a Bar to his DFC. The published citation read:

This officer has displayed great skill and coolness throughout the numerous operational missions in which he has participated and has destroyed at least nine enemy aircraft and damaged a further seven. As a flight commander he has invariably displayed a high sense of responsibility for the safety of his fellow pilots.

— London Gazette, No. 35241, 8 August 1941

Having previously been engaged in the Circus offensive, No. 74 Squadron was based at Acklington for a period of rest. Operating the Spitfire on monotonous convoy patrols, it saw little action. Richey's tenure as its commander was brief. After the Battle of France, he had written an account of his experiences and those of his fellow pilots of No. 1 Squadron, and this was published in mid-1941 under the title Fighter Pilot by B. T. Batsford Limited, although without identifying the author or his fellow pilots. Its initial print run of 75,000 was sold out and it was well received critically, with one reviewer describing it as "A grand story". The leader of Fighter Command, Air Marshal Sir William Sholto-Douglas, read the book and after determining that Richey was the author, had him assigned to his staff in November. Later that month, the Belgian government in exile awarded Richey the Croix de Guerre for "his bravery and coolness which he showed in leading a squadron of Belgian fighter pilots during numerous offensive operations above the continent". Similarly, the Free French government recognised Richey's exploits with its own Croix de Guerre with bronze palm, for the "best personal example to the French Pilots in the unit which he commanded".

=== Later war service ===
By the start of 1942 Richey had wrangled a return to operations with a posting to No. 56 Squadron, as a supernumerary pilot. His new unit was in the process of converting to the newly developed Hawker Typhoon interceptor and during his brief time at Fighter Command headquarters, Richey had been involved in the decision to have the squadron receive this new type of aircraft. The squadron's Typhoons had a troubled introduction to RAF service with a number of serious crashes arising from structural failures but it became operational by May, commencing patrols to detect incoming Luftwaffe raids. By this time Richey held the rank of temporary squadron leader, having been promoted on 1 March.

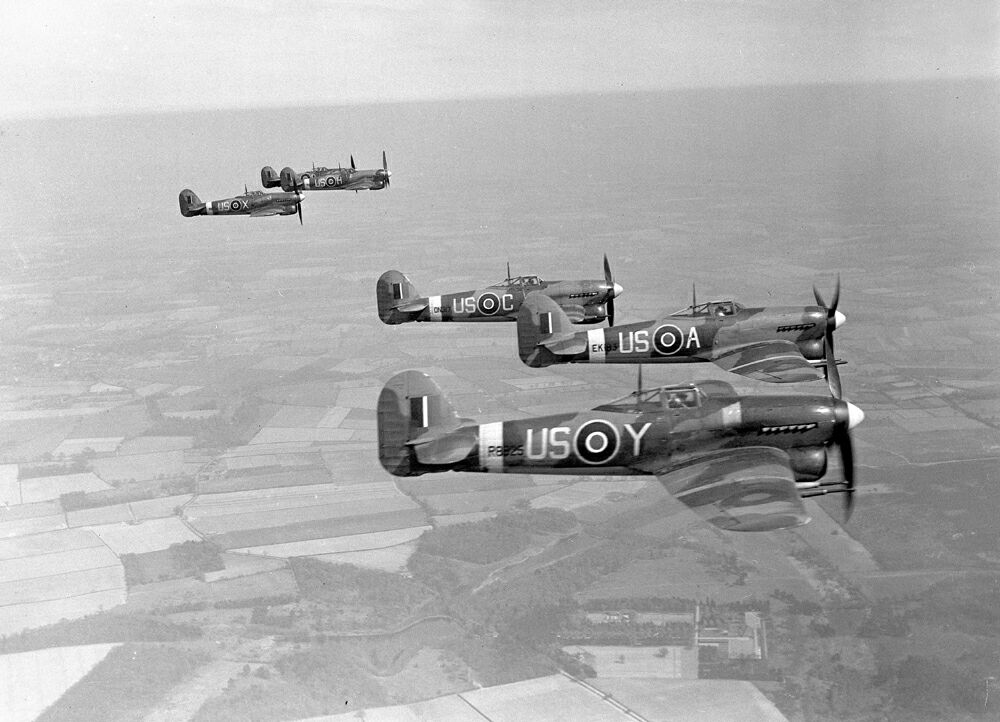
A flight of Hawker Typhoon fighters of No. 56 Squadron

In June, Richey took command of No. 609 Squadron, his former unit. This was now based at Duxford and had recently reequipped with Typhoons. It carried out relatively few sweeps to occupied France and most of its duties for the few months following Richey's arrival involved patrolling. However, it was involved in Operation Jubilee, the Allied amphibious attack on Dieppe, on 19 August; flying with the Duxford wing, it flew an uneventful sortie in the late morning. A second sortie in the mid-afternoon, covering the fleet returning from Dieppe, resulted in the squadron having an engagement with Focke-Wulf Fw 190 fighters. Three of these were claimed as damaged by the squadron's pilots. In its third and final sortie of 19 August, carried out in the late afternoon, Richey's Typhoon developed a fault and he returned early.

Richey was promoted to wing commander in October and sent to British India for a new appointment. However, while in transit he suffered a series of medical issues, including appendicitis and amoebic dysentery, which meant that he never took up his intended posting as commander of No. 165 Wing, at Comilla. He sought to stay in the region instead of being repatriated to the United Kingdom and in December, he was assigned to lead No. 189 Wing in the Imphal Valley. However, he had ongoing issues with sinusitis and this eventually saw him sent back to the United Kingdom in February 1944. Richey spent the remainder of the war in staff postings, firstly at Supreme Headquarters Allied Expeditionary Force and then at the headquarters of Second Tactical Air Force.

Richey ended the war credited with having shot down eleven German aircraft, one of which was shared with another pilot, while a further aerial victory was unconfirmed. He was also credited with the probable destruction of two aircraft, one being shared, and damaging six German aircraft.

== Postwar period ==
Richey finished his service with the RAF in 1946 and took up employment with the Anglo-Iranian Oil Company, responsible for the company's products provided to the aerospace industry in Europe. He subsequently worked as a correspondent for the Daily Express, commentating on aviation matters.

In July 1948, Richey joined the Royal Auxiliary Air Force (RAuxAF) as a flight lieutenant. He served with the RAuxAF's No. 601 Squadron, which was commanded by Sir Max Aitken, his employer at the Daily Express. In May 1949 he was appointed an Officer in the Belgian Order of the Crown by the Prince Regent of Belgium, "...in recognition of valuable services rendered in connection with the war". Later in the year, he was promoted to squadron leader and appointed to command of the squadron. Richey was transferred to the reserve in January 1952, thereby ceasing his command of No. 601 Squadron. He retired from the military with effect from 20 July 1958.

== Later life ==
While in Italy in April 1959 Richey performed a rescue of a woman who had been swept into the sea. For this, he was awarded the Royal Humane Society's bronze medal. Fond of France, Richey spent much of his later years there, working on a book about French-English relations. He was appointed a Chevalier (Knight) of the Legion of Honour in 1980. He died on 23 February 1989, aged 72. After his death, an unfinished followup to his book Fighter Pilot was discovered amongst his papers. Covering the balance of his wartime career, this was subsequently worked upon by military aviation historian Norman Franks and published in 1993 as Fighter Pilot's Summer. Richey's original book has been republished a number of times, as recently as 2015.

Some of his papers are held by the Imperial War Museum while others are held by the Georgetown University Library. Richey was the brother of Michael Richey, who served in the Royal Navy during the Second World War and wrote extensively on navigation matters as well as making a number of solo trans-Atlantic sailing voyages.
