= No. 118 Squadron RAF =

Defunct flying squadron of the Royal Air Force

- Active: 1 January 1918 - 7 September 1918; 20 February 1941 - 10 March 1946; 10 May 1951 - 22 August 1957; 1 September 1959 – 31 August 1962
- Country: United Kingdom
- Branch: Royal Air Force
- Motto(s): Latin: Occido redeoque ("I kill and return")

No. 118 Squadron was a squadron of the British Royal Air Force. Originally formed in 1918, it served as a fighter squadron in the Second World War, flying Spitfires and Mustangs. It flew jet fighters as part of RAF Germany in the 1950s, and Bristol Sycamore helicopters in Northern Ireland before finally disbanding in 1962.

== Operational history ==
=== First World War ===
The squadron was formed as No. 118 Squadron Royal Flying Corps at Catterick Airfield, North Yorkshire, on 1 January 1918 with the intention of becoming a night bomber unit. It received a mixture of aircraft for training, including Airco DH.6s, Royal Aircraft Factory B.E.2s and Royal Aircraft Factory F.E.2bs. The squadron moved to Netheravon on 15 April that year, and again to Bicester Airfield on 7 August, with the intention that it would receive Handley Page O/400 heavy bombers before moving to France. A change of plans meant that it would wait for Vickers Vimys instead of the O/400s, but the squadron received none before being disbanded on 7 September 1918.

=== Second World War ===
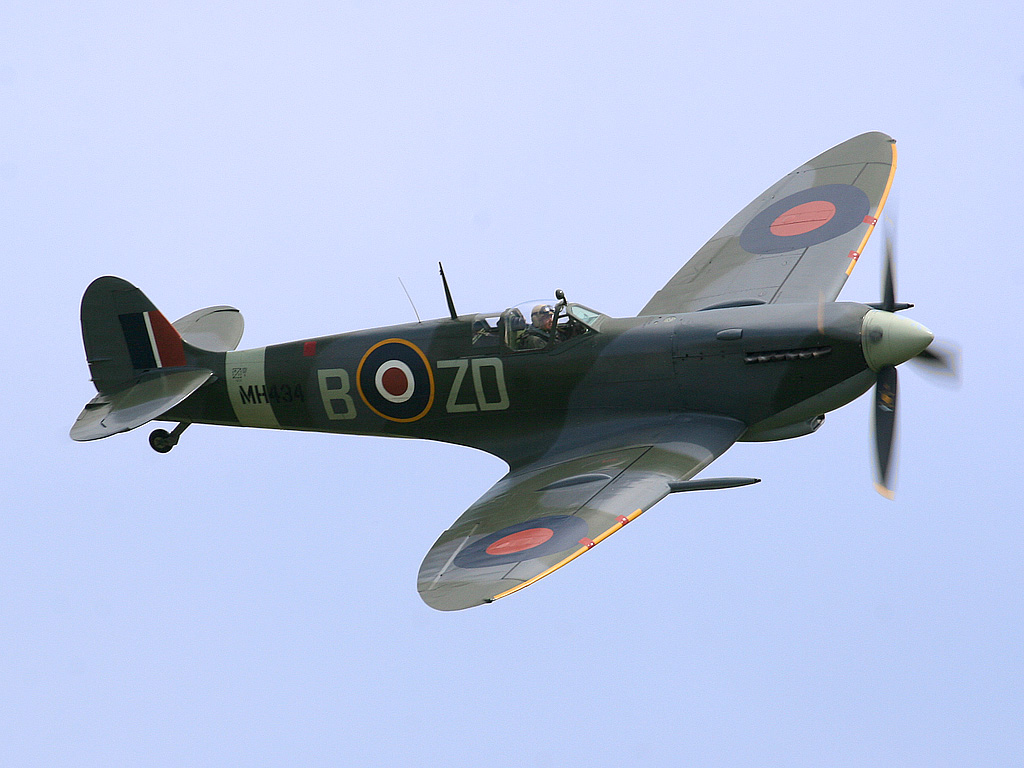
Supermarine Spitfire

On 20 February 1941, No. 118 reformed at RAF Filton, near Bristol, as a No. 10 Group fighter squadron equipped with Supermarine Spitfire Mk.I fighters, soon supplementing them with Spitfire Mk.IIs.It was commanded by Flight Lieutenant Frank Howell, an experienced fighter pilot. On 28 March, convoy patrols began and after moving to RAF Ibsley in April, it started to fly escort missions for anti-shipping strikes, as well as defensive patrols and fighter sweeps over northern France.

The squadron re-equipped with Spitfire Mk Vbs in September 1941, continuing to fly escort for anti-shipping strikes over the English Channel and for bombing raids. On 12 February it took part in the unsuccessful attempts to intercept the German battleships Scharnhorst, Gneisenau and heavy cruiser Prinz Eugen when they sailed through the Channel, escorting bombers searching for the German squadron. In August 1942, the Ibsley-based fighter wing, including 118 Squadron, moved to RAF Tangmere to support the Dieppe Raid. The squadron flew four missions during the day of the raid, claiming two Dornier Do 217 bombers destroyed.

The squadron moved to RAF Zeals in Wiltshire on 24 August and to RAF Coltishall in East Anglia on 17 January 1943, operating over Belgium, the Netherlands and the North Sea. A major task was escorting the light bombers of No. 2 Group RAF on raids over the Netherlands, often encountering heavy German opposition. A particularly violent engagement took place on 3 May 1943, when the Spitfires of 118, 167 and 504 Squadrons escorted the Lockheed Venturas of No. 487 Squadron RNZAF on a raid against a power station in Amsterdam. The German defences had been alerted by a fighter sweep earlier that day, and the raid was met by over 70 German fighters. Although 118 Squadron claimed two Focke-Wulf Fw 190s for the loss of one Spitfire, the escort could not keep the German fighters from the bombers of 487 Squadron, all but one of the Venturas being shot down.

The Squadron moved to RAF Peterhead in Aberdeenshire on 20 September to carry out defensive duties over northern Scotland, with a detachment at RAF Skeabrae in the Orkney Islands, moving to RAF Castletown in Caithness in October. In February 1944 the Squadron, by now equipped with more modern Spitfire IXs, moved to RAF Detling in Kent where it became part of Second TAF, but on 10 March it moved back to Skeabrae, remaining in Orkney for four months.

It moved south again in July 1944, flying escort missions over Normandy from RAF Detling until August. The Squadron moved to RAF Westhampnett in Sussex at the end of August, and to RAF Manston in September, flying escort missions for Bomber Command's heavy bombers during daylight raids. The short range Spitfire was not ideal for the long-range escort missions now required, and in January 1945 the squadron, by now based at RAF Bentwaters, re-equipped with the longer-ranged North American Mustang, continuing these operations until the end of the war in Europe. In all it claimed 29 enemy aircraft destroyed during the war, with a further nine probably destroyed and 27 damaged. On 10 March 1946, the Squadron was disbanded.

=== Post war operations - jets and helicopters ===
The squadron again reformed as a fighter-bomber squadron serving in RAF Germany on 10 May 1951. It flew de Havilland Vampires out of RAF Fassberg in Lower Saxony, close to the border with East Germany. The Vampire was obsolete however, and in November 1953 the squadron received de Havilland Venoms. Even the Venom was outdated by 1955, and so the squadron discarded its Venoms in March that year when it moved to RAF Jever, operating swept-wing Hawker Hunters in the pure day-fighter role. It kept the Hunters until 22 August 1957 when it was disbanded as a result of the 1957 Defence Review.

On 1 September 1959, as a response to a campaign of attacks by the IRA, a detached Search and rescue flight of No. 228 Squadron at RAF Aldergrove equipped with three Bristol Sycamore helicopters was re-designated 118 Squadron on 1 September 1959. It flew its Sycamores in support of the Royal Ulster Constabulary (RUC), carrying out short range transport and reconnaissance missions. Other duties of the squadron included experiments in traffic control. On 31 August 1962, with the threat from the IRA ended by a ceasefire, the Squadron was disbanded.

== Aircraft operated ==
Source except where indicated.

- Airco DH.6 - 1918
- Royal Aircraft Factory B.E.2 - 1918
- Royal Aircraft Factory F.E.2b - 1918.
- Supermarine Spitfire I - 1941
- Supermarine Spitfire IIA - March 1941 to September 1941.
- Supermarine Spitfire VB - September 1941 to January 1944.
- Miles Martinet - at least one operated as target tug in January 1943.
- Supermarine Spitfire VI - one or two operated September 1943.
- Supermarine Spitfire IX - January 1944 to March 1944.
- Supermarine Spitfire V - March 1944 to July 1944.
- Supermarine Spitfire VII - March 1944.
- Supermarine Spitfire IX - July 1944 to January 1945.
- North American Mustang - January 1945 to March 1946.
- De Havilland Vampire FB.5 - May 1951 to November 1953.
- De Havilland Venom FB.1 - November 1953 to March 1955.
- Hawker Hunter F.4 - March 1955 to July 1957.
- Bristol Sycamore HR.14 - September 1959 to August 1962.

== Bibliography ==
- Delve, Ken (2006). The Military Airfields of Britain: Northern England: Co. Durham, Cumbria, Isle of Man, Lancashire, Merseyside, Manchester, Northumberland, Tyne & Wear, Yorkshire. Ramsbury, Wiltshire, UK: The Crowood Press. ISBN 1-86126-809-2.
- Halley, James J. (1980). The Squadrons of the Royal Air Force. Tonbridge, Kent, UK: Air Britain (Historians) Ltd. ISBN 0-85130-083-9.
- Rawlings, John D. R. (1982). Coastal, Support and Special Squadrons of the RAF and Their Aircraft. London: Jane's Publishing. ISBN 0-7106-0187-5.
- Richards, Denis (1995). The Hardest Victory: RAF Bomber Command in the Second World War. London: Coronet. ISBN 0-340-61720-9.
- Thomas, Andrew (January–February 1998). "I Kill and Return: No 118 Squadron Royal Air Force". Air Enthusiast. No. 73. pp. 64–71. ISSN 0143-5450.
