= Michael Robinson (RAF officer) =

British flying ace of WWII

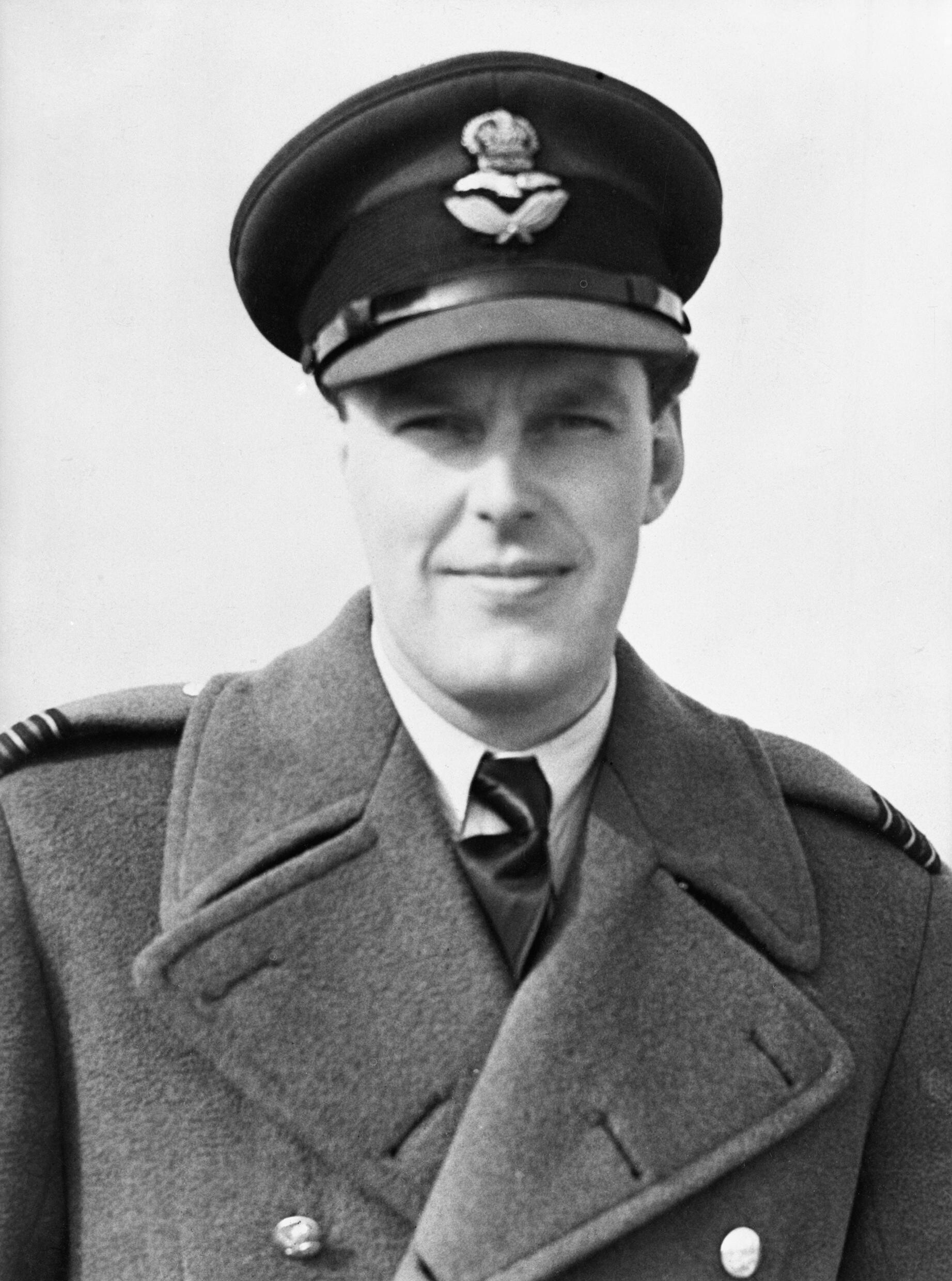
- Robinson, 1942
- Born: 8 May 1917; Chelsea, London, United Kingdom
- Died: 10 April 1942 (aged 24) off the French coast
- Relatives: Roy Robinson, 1st Baron Robinson (father); Paul Richey (brother-in-law)
- Military career
- Allegiance: United Kingdom
- Branch: Royal Air Force
- Service years: 1935–1942 †
- Rank: Wing Commander
- Commands: Tangmere Wing; Biggin Hill Wing; No. 609 Squadron
- Conflicts: Second World War: Battle of Britain; Circus offensive
- Awards: Distinguished Service Order; Distinguished Flying Cross; Mention in Despatches

Michael Lister Robinson DSO, DFC (8 May 1917 – 10 April 1942) was a British flying ace of the Royal Air Force (RAF) during the Second World War. He is credited with shooting down at least sixteen aircraft.

Born in Chelsea, London, Robinson joined the RAF in 1935. Once his training was completed, he was posted to No. 111 Squadron but by the time of the outbreak of the Second World War, he was serving as an instructor. In March 1940, he was sent to France where he flew with No. 87 Squadron until he was injured in an aircraft accident and repatriated to the United Kingdom for hospital treatment. Once he recovered from his injuries he was posted to No. 601 Squadron and flew extensively in the later stages of the Battle of Britain, during which he shot down several aircraft. Awarded the Distinguished Flying Cross for his successes, the following year he was appointed commander of No. 609 Squadron. He destroyed more German aircraft during his period in command, for which he received the Distinguished Service Order. By August 1941, he was a wing commander and leader of the Biggin Hill fighter wing. He spent the final months of the year on staff duties but returned to operational flying with an appointment as leader of the Tangmere fighter wing in January 1942. He was killed in action three months later.

== Early life ==
Michael Lister Robinson was born on 8 May 1917 in the United Kingdom, in the London suburb of Chelsea. His father was Australian-born Roy Robinson, the future Lord Robinson. He went to school in Bath, at Downside School. One of his fellow students at Downside was future flying ace Paul Richey, who would also become his brother-in-law. Once Robinson's schooling was completed, he joined the Royal Air Force on a short service commission in September 1935.

In August 1936, having completed his pilot training at No. 3 Flying Training School, Robinson was posted to No. 111 Squadron. His new unit was stationed at Northolt and equipped with the Gloster Gauntlet biplane aircraft but soon was to be the first RAF squadron to receive the Hawker Hurricane fighter. He remained with this unit until late January 1939 at which time he was transferred to No. 11 Group Pool, a pilot depot, at St Athan as an instructor. Later in the year he was promoted to acting flight lieutenant.

== Second World War ==
In March 1940, with the Second World War underway, Robinson was sent to France to join No. 85 Squadron but his posting was changed while he was in transit. He instead went to No. 87 Squadron, also in France but based at Lille and equipped with Hurricanes. His rank of flight lieutenant was made substantive on 16 April. The squadron saw little action during the Phoney War and he was involved in an aircraft accident on 6 May and his injuries to his hand warranted repatriation to the United Kingdom where he was hospitalised. By August, he had recovered and was posted to No. 601 Squadron.

=== Battle of Britain ===
At the time of Robinson's arrival at the squadron, it operated Hurricanes from Debden as part of No. 12 Group and was seeing an increase in Luftwaffe activity in the area. On 31 August, Robinson claimed his first aerial victories, destroying a Messerschmitt Bf 109 fighter to the south of Maidstone. The same day, over the Thames Estuary, he engaged and probably destroyed a Bf 109 and damaged a second. He shared in the probable destruction of a Messerschmitt Bf 110 heavy fighter south of Worthing on 4 September, and two days later destroyed a Bf 109, this time north of Mayfield. He probably shot down a Bf 110 on 25 September, the last aerial victory he achieved while flying with No. 601 Squadron. Shortly afterwards he was transferred to No. 238 Squadron, and on 30 September, intercepting a Luftwaffe raid to the south of Portland, he shot down two Bf 110s and probably destroyed a Bf 109.

In early October Robinson was appointed commander of No. 609 Squadron. His new unit was equipped with Supermarine Spitfire fighters and based at Middle Wallop. On 7 October he destroyed two Bf 110s but towards the end of the month, the Luftwaffe's offensive against England began to slow down. For his successes in the preceding weeks, Robinson was awarded the Distinguished Flying Cross and the official announcement was made in The London Gazette on 26 November. The published citation read:

Squadron Leader Robinson has shown conspicuous gallantry and leadership in his attacks against the enemy. On two days, in combat with large enemy forces, he destroyed two of their aircraft on each occasion, bringing his total victories to at least six.

— London Gazette, No. 35001, 26 November 1940

=== Circus offensive ===
No. 609 Squadron spent the winter of 1940–41 at Warmwell but in February 1941, it relocated to Biggin Hill and began to be involved in Fighter Command's circus offensive, regularly flying sweeps to France to draw out Luftwaffe fighters and to escort bombers. On 7 May, Robinson damaged a Bf 109 over the Strait of Dover. The following day he destroyed two Bf 109s several kilometres south of Dungeness. He was promoted to temporary squadron leader on 1 June. Three days later, with another pilot, he damaged a Bf 109 south of Dover. He damaged another Bf 109 at the end of the month, while on a sortie inland of Dunkirk.

On 3 July, the RAF mounted a bombing raid on railway facilities at Hazebrouck and while No. 609 Squadron provided cover for the attacking British bombers, Robinson shot down a Bf 109. Flying another sortie the same day, also to Hazebrouck, Robinson shot down a second Bf 109 and damaged a third. Flying another sortie the next day, he damaged a Bf 109. He damaged another Bf 109 on 8 July, this time to the south of Gravelines. He destroyed a Bf 109 on 10 July, while flying over Hardelot, and then shot down another of the same type the next day near Saint-Omer. Yet another Bf 109 was shot down by Robinson on 12 July, this time south of Cap Gris-Nez. He destroyed a further Bf 109 two days later near Le Touquet.

Robinson damaged a Bf 109 near Saint-Omer on 19 July and then repeated the feat on 24 July in the same area, while also destroying another Bf 109. At the end of the month, he was promoted to wing commander and given command of the fighter wing at Biggin Hill, succeeding the South African flying ace Adolph Malan. At the time of Robinson's appointment, he was one of the youngest wing leaders in the RAF. Within a few days, he was awarded the Distinguished Service Order (DSO) in recognition of his leadership of No. 609 Squadron. The published citation for Robinson's DSO read:

This officer has commanded the squadron since October, 1940. He has acted as leader in recent offensive operations over occupied territory and, on numerous occasions, has led his wing with determination, skill and courage. The successes obtained reflect the greatest credit on the leadership and devotion to duty of this officer. He has destroyed at least fourteen enemy aircraft and damaged others.

— London Gazette, No. 35238, 5 August 1941

His first victory as leader of the Biggin Hill wing was achieved on 7 August, when he claimed a Bf 109 as probably destroyed in the area between Mardyck and Gravelines. While engaged in a search and rescue mission for a pilot downed in the English Channel on 19 August, he ran out of fuel and had to crash-land at Manston airfield. Soon afterwards, he was awarded the Belgian Croix de Guerre by the Belgian government in exile "in recognition 'of valuable services rendered in connection with the War". He shot down a Bf 109 near Gravelines on 27 August, his final aerial victory as he was rested from operation and sent on leave early the following month.

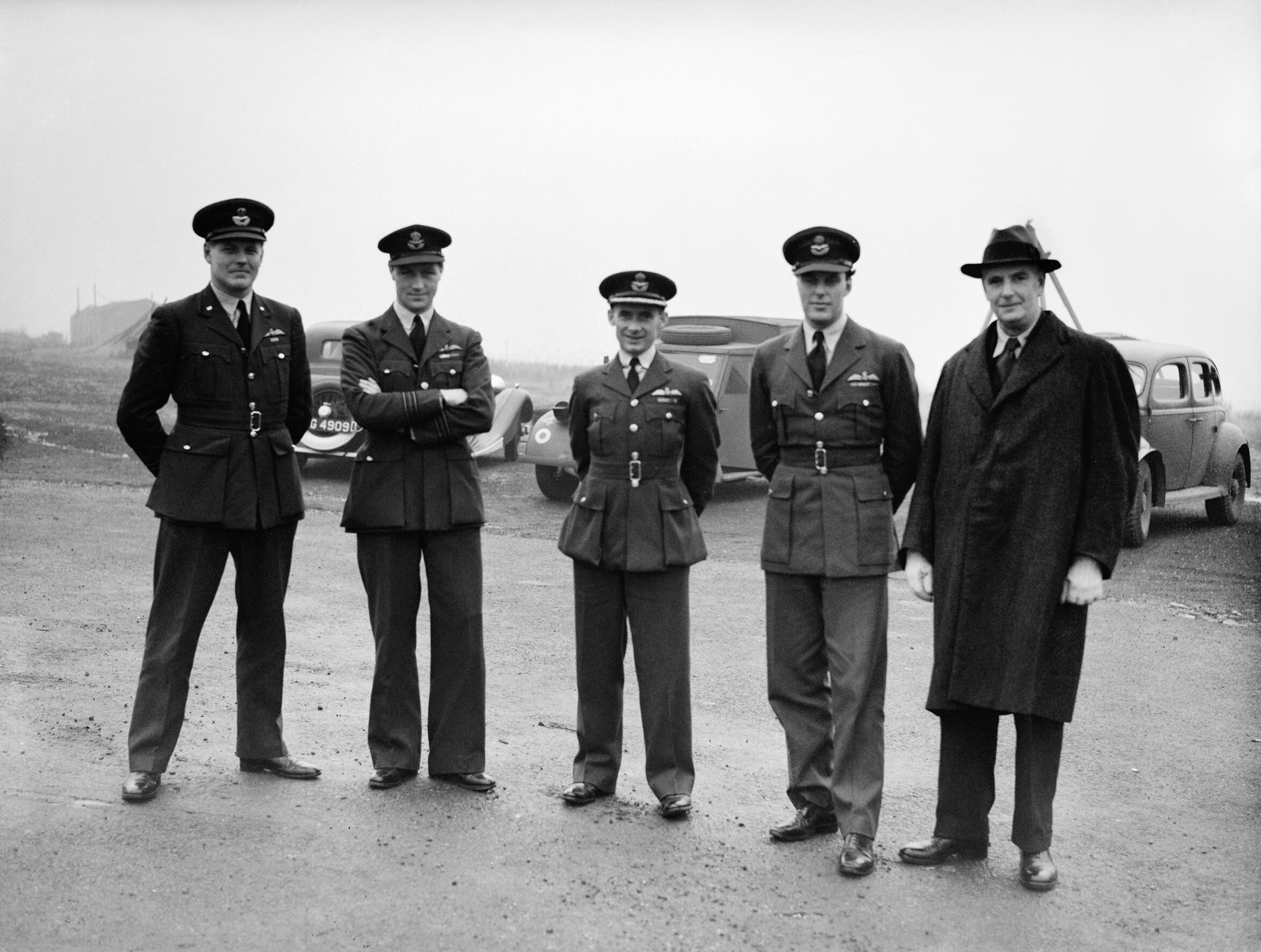
In a photograph taken on the occasion of the presentation of No. 609 Squadron's crest, Robinson stands second right in this group; his father, Sir Roy Robinson, stands first right

Robinson was appointed the station commander at Manston once his leave was completed but this was only for a short period of time as in October he was appointed to the staff of the Inspector General of the RAF. He was mentioned in despatches in the 1942 New Year Honours, and on the day this was announced, 1 January 1942, was appointed commander of the fighter wing at Tangmere. Making a cross-channel sweep to occupied France on 10 April 1942, he was engaged by Focke-Wulf Fw 190 fighters of Jagdgeschwader 26. Both he and his wingman were shot down off the French coast and killed.

Having no known grave, Robinson is commemorated on the Commonwealth War Graves Commission's Air Forces Memorial near Egham in Surrey, England. At the time of his presumed death, he was credited with having shot down sixteen German aircraft, and four more probably destroyed, plus a fifth shared with another pilot. He is also credited with damaging eight aircraft. His medals are held in the collection of the Imperial War Museum.
