= Frank Howell =

British WWII flying ace (1912–1948)

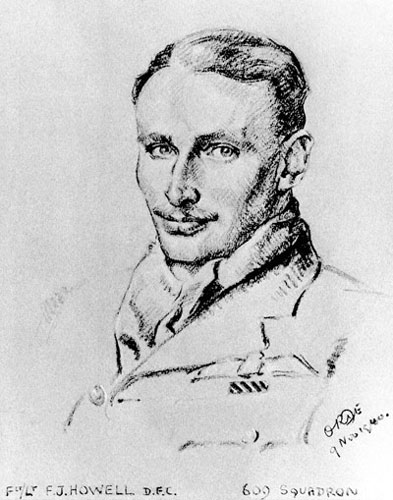
- Portrait of Howell, made by Cuthbert Orde in November 1940
- Born: 25 January 1912; Golders Green, London, United Kingdom
- Died: 9 May 1948 (aged 36); RAF Odiham, Hampshire, United Kingdom
- Burial place: St. Mary's Churchyard, Felpham, United Kingdom
- Military career
- Allegiance: United Kingdom
- Branch: Royal Air Force
- Service years: 1937–1948
- Rank: Wing commander
- Commands: No. 118 Squadron; No. 243 Squadron; No. 54 Squadron
- Conflicts: Second World War: Battle of France; Battle of Britain; Circus offensive; Battle of Singapore
- Awards: Distinguished Flying Cross & Bar

Frank Jonathan Howell, DFC & Bar (25 January 1912 – 9 May 1948) was a British flying ace who served with the Royal Air Force (RAF) during the Second World War. He was credited with having shot down at least ten aircraft.

Born in London, Howell joined the RAF in 1937 and once he gained his wings, was posted to No. 25 Squadron. At the time of the outbreak of the Second World War, he was serving with No. 80 Squadron in Egypt but soon afterwards returned to the United Kingdom and was posted to No. 609 Squadron. He flew in the later stages of the Battle of France, providing aerial cover for the evacuation of the British Expeditionary Force from Dunkirk, and during the following Battle of Britain. By the end of October 1940, he had achieved several aerial victories and was awarded the Distinguished Flying Cross. He commanded No. 118 Squadron for much of 1941 before being sent to the Far East to command No. 243 Squadron at Singapore. He was made a prisoner of war after the Battle of Singapore. He remained in the RAF in the postwar period, becoming commander of No. 54 Squadron. He was killed in an aircraft accident at the RAF station at Odiham.

== Early life ==
Frank Jonathan Howell was born on 25 January 1912 at Golders Green in London, in the United Kingdom. He was a student at Chichester School and following the completion of his education in 1929, clerked at the Commercial Union Assurance Company. He changed vocation in 1934, becoming a mechanic at the Egham Motor Company. He later worked for Henry Howell & Co.

Howell joined the Royal Air Force (RAF) in early 1937 on a short service commission. He commenced training on 1 March at No. 9 Elementary & Reserve Flying Training School at Ansty before proceeding to No. 3 Flying Training School at South Cerney two months later as an acting pilot officer. After he gained his wings in July he was posted to No. 25 Squadron. This was a squadron based at Hawkinge and equipped with the Hawker Fury fighter.

Howell's acting pilot officer rank was made permanent on 1 March 1938 and later that month he was posted to No. 80 Squadron. His new squadron, which operated the Gloster Gladiator fighter, was based at El Amiriya, in Egypt, as part of the defences of the Suez Canal.

== Second World War ==
Following the outbreak of the Second World War, Howell, who by this time had been promoted to flying officer, returned to the United Kingdom to take up a posting at No. 609 Squadron. His new squadron had only just become operational with Supermarine Spitfire fighters and, stationed at Kinloss, was flying convoy patrols. In May 1940, the squadron shifted south to Northolt from where it helped provide aerial cover for the evacuation of the British Expeditionary Force from Dunkirk. On 31 May, about 5 miles (8.0 km) to the northeast of Dunkirk, Howell shared in the destruction of a Junkers Ju 88 medium bomber. The following day he and another pilot combined to damage a Heinkel He 111 medium bomber over Dunkirk itself. He was appointed a flight commander in the squadron the same day.

=== Battle of Britain ===
During the early phase of the Battle of Britain, No. 609 Squadron was tasked with protecting Southampton and Portland, as well as the convoys plying the southern coastline. In the morning of 12 July, 3 miles (4.8 km) to the east of Portland Bill, he and two other pilots of the squadron shared in the destruction of a He 111 although this success was not confirmed. He claimed a share in a Ju 88 destroyed over Swanage on 18 July, but this was another victory that was unconfirmed. His Spitfire was damaged by return gunfire from the Ju 88 in the engagement and he bailed out into the English Channel. He was picked up by a launch of the Royal Navy.

No. 609 Squadron subsequently moved to the RAF station at Middle Wallop. Flying from there on 13 August, Howell shot down a Junkers Ju 87 dive bomber near Warmwell, and two days later destroyed a Ju 88 in the same area. He destroyed one Messerschmitt Bf 110 heavy fighter near Portsmouth on 25 August, also damaging a second the same day. When the Luftwaffe began to focus its attacks on London, No. 609 Squadron was called upon to assist and on 7 September, Howell probably destroyed a Bf 110 and a Ju 88 over the city. By this time he was a flight lieutenant, having been promoted to this rank earlier in the month.

Howell damaged one Dornier Do 17 medium bomber over London on 15 September and the same day destroyed a second to the south of Rye. He shot down a Bf 110 to the northwest of Portland on 3 October. His final aerial victory of the Battle of Britain was on 21 October, when he and Pilot Officer S. Hill shared in the destruction of a Ju 88. This was the 100th aircraft to have been destroyed by pilots of No. 609 Squadron. A few days later he was recognised for his successes in the fighting over England with an award of the Distinguished Flying Cross (DFC). The citation, published in The London Gazette, read:

This officer has shot down four enemy aircraft, has been partly responsible for the destruction of five more and has damaged several others. He has led both the squadron and his flight with skill and determination, which have undoubtedly contributed greatly to recent successes. Flight Lieutenant Howell's keenness and energy combined with his courage and leadership in many combats have set a splendid example to the rest of the squadron.

— London Gazette, No. 34978, 25 October 1940

The following month, the squadron shifted to west to Warmwell where it saw out the winter months.

=== Squadron command ===
In February 1941 Howell was appointed the first commander of No. 118 Squadron, which had formed at Filton with Spitfires. The squadron became operational the following month, after a move to Pembrey from where it conducted patrols over shipping convoys. In April it moved to Colerne and began to be involved in the RAF's defensive operations over southern England. In the summer the squadron switched to offensive operations, often flying on sorties and escort missions to France as part of the RAF's Circus offensive while also carrying out its defensive patrols at night. On one of these, during the night of 7 July, Howell destroyed a He 111 over Southampton, the first aerial victory for No. 118 Squadron.

Howell was promoted to acting squadron leader in September and the following month, on 15 October he shared in the destruction of a Messerschmitt Bf 109 fighter near Le Havre. He relinquished command of No. 118 Squadron later that month. He was subsequently awarded a Bar to his DFC; the citation for this read:

This officer has displayed fine qualities as a fighter pilot combined with outstanding leadership and talent for organisation. He has played a large part in raising and maintaining a high standard of operational efficiency in his Squadron which has greatly distinguished itself during recent operations. Throughout, Squadron Leader Howell has set an excellent example. He has destroyed at least 10 enemy aircraft and probably a further seven.

— London Gazette, No. 35334, 4 November 1941

=== Singapore ===
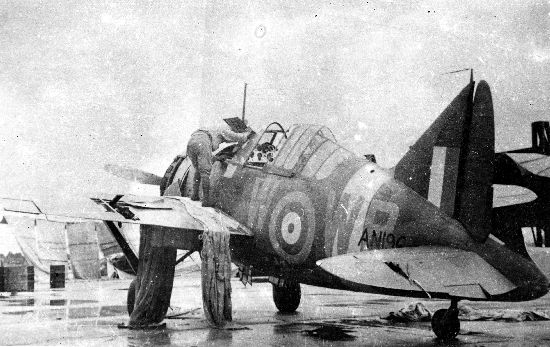
A Brewster Buffalo of No. 243 Squadron, Singapore

Posted to Singapore, Howell left the United Kingdom aboard HMS Prince of Wales and during his passage served as a fleet aviation officer to Admiral Tom Phillips, commander of the Eastern Fleet. On arrival at Singapore on 2 December, Howell took command of No. 243 Squadron. This was stationed at the RAF's station at Kallang and equipped with Brewster Buffalo fighters. Most of its flying personnel were inexperienced pilots of the Royal New Zealand Air Force although its flight leaders were British veterans of the Battle of Britain. Howell found conditions at Kallang to be unsatisfactory and the airfield was poorly prepared for attack. Less than a week after his arrival, the Japanese invaded British Malaya. As they advanced to Singapore, it transpired that the Buffaloes performed poorly against the Japanese fighters.

Howell did not think highly of the Buffaloes that his squadron flew, considering them worn out and difficult to fly in a fully armed and fueled state. Despite this, he sought to have some modified for night fighter duties, organising a flame trap for the exhausts of the aircraft. At least two aircraft received this modification and flew sorties at night to counter Japanese bombing raids on Singapore, although without success. As the Japanese aerial attacks on Singapore escalated, Howell was often called upon to assist in fighter control duties, in addition to leading No. 243 Squadron. On 16 January 1942, while patrolling near Johore, he destroyed a Nakajima Ki-27 fighter, reporting that after he fired his machine guns at it, the wing broke off prior to it crashing into the ground.

Later in January Howell was hospitalised, suffering dysentery. No. 243 Squadron was effectively non-existent by the time Singapore was surrendered to the Japanese on 15 February. The same day, along with other RAF officers, Howell tried to escape Singapore by an Air-Sea Rescue launch. The vessel was sunk by Japanese bombers. Although collected by passing steamers, Howell was captured on 16 February. He spent the remainder of the war in Japanese captivity.

== Postwar period ==
Repatriated to the United Kingdom after being released as a prisoner of war, Howell remained in the RAF in the postwar period. After undergoing refresher training in early 1946, he proceeded to No. 17 Flying Training School in April. Two months later he was posted to the headquarters of Fighter Command in an administrative role. His acting rank of squadron leader was made substantive in November. Howell was posted to No. 54 Squadron, stationed at Odiham, at the start of 1948. Initially he was a supernumerary pilot but he was subsequently promoted to acting wing commander and appointed commander of the squadron in mid-January. On 9 May he was filming the landing of De Havilland Vampire fighters at Odiham when he was struck in the head by the wing tip of one of the aircraft. The impact resulted in a cerebral haemorrhage, causing Howell's death.

Buried at St. Mary's Churchyard in Felpham, West Sussex, Howell is credited with having shot down ten aircraft, three being shared with other pilots. Two further shared aerial victories were unconfirmed. He also claimed two aircraft as probably destroyed and three damaged, one of which was shared.
