= Laurence Stark =

- Born: 16 November 1920; Bolton, Lancashire, England
- Died: 1 August 2004 (aged 83); Rochester, Kent, England
- Military career
- Allegiance: United Kingdom
- Branch: Royal Air Force
- Service years: 1940–1963
- Rank: Squadron Leader
- Nickname: Pinkie
- Service number: 148445
- Commands: No. 609 Squadron RAF
- Conflicts: Second World War
- Awards: Distinguished Flying Cross & Bar; Air Force Cross; Croix de Guerre (Belgium)
- Other work: Manager of Rochester Airport

Laurence 'Pinkie' Stark, DFC & Bar, AFC (16 November 1920 – 1 August 2004) was a Royal Air Force pilot and Second World War flying ace.

== Early life ==
Laurence William Fraser Stark was born on 16 November 1920 in Bolton, Lancashire.

== Second World War ==
Stark joined the Royal Air Force (RAF) in 1940 as an aircraftman 2nd class (service number 1058229) and was sent for flying training in Canada. Returning to England in mid-1941 he flew the Boulton Paul Defiant until posted to No. 182 Squadron RAF flying the Hawker Typhoon. On 10 January 1943 Stark was posted to No. 609 Squadron RAF. The squadron had been tasked to counter the hit and run attacks over south-east England by Luftwaffe Focke-Wulf Fw 190s. On 12 March Stark had his first victory when he downed a Fw 190 over Dunkirk. He was commissioned from flight sergeant to pilot officer on 11 June and, on 12 December, flying officer.

Stark shot down two Junkers Ju 88 bombers over France, one in October and the other on 2 November 1943. On 4 January 1944 he shared in the destruction of a Dornier Do 217. He also shot down a Focke-Wulf Fw 58 Weihe and another Fw 190, with 5½ victories and another aircraft destroyed on the ground he qualified as a flying ace.

In February 1944 Stark was posted to No. 263 Squadron RAF to carry out ground-attack operations, still with the Typhoon. In March he was awarded a Distinguished Flying Cross (DFC). He flew sorties in support of the D-Day landing attacking ground targets in northern France but, on 3 July, flying a Hawker Typhoon aircraft serial MN527 "X" he was shot down in Brittany baling out near Kerpert. With the help of the French resistance he evaded capture and returned to England in a motor boat. In October 1944 he was awarded a Bar to his DFC. Stark later returned to No. 609 Squadron as commanding officer to continue the ground-attack work.

== Post war ==
Post-war Stark's wartime rank of flight lieutenant was confirmed, and he continued flying in the RAF as a test pilot and in particular with the Blind Landing Experimental Unit performing automatic landing trials. He retired from the RAF on 3 December 1963, retaining the rank of squadron leader, and later became manager of Rochester Airport.

== Honours and awards ==
- 7 March 1944 – Flying Officer Lawrence William Fraser Stark (148445), Royal Air Force Volunteer Reserve, No. 609 Squadron is awarded the Distinguished Flying Cross:

This officer is a cool and resourceful fighter who had invariably displayed great keenness and determination. He has shot down 6 enemy aircraft in combat, whilst in attacks on the enemy targets on the ground he has destroyed an aircraft and a locomotive; he has also attacked a number of small vessels such as tugs and barges with damaging effect.

— London Gazette

- 3 October 1944 – Acting Flight Lieutenant Laurence William Fraser Stark DFC (148445), RAFVR, 263 Squadron is awarded a Bar to his Distinguished Flying Cross:

Flight Lieutenant Stark has a completed a large number of sorties. He has led his flight against many difficult and dangerous targets and despite heavy enemy opposition he has always pressed home his attacks to a successful conclusion. His excellent leadership, courage and fine fighting spirit have set a splendid example to all.

— London Gazette

- 1 January 1950 – Flight Lieutenant Laurence William Fraser Stark DFC (148445), RAF is awarded the Air Force Cross.
- 10 November 1950 – Permission is given to Acting Squadron Leader Lawrence William Fraser Stark, DFC, AFC (148445), Royal Air Force to wear the Croix de Guerre, 1940 with palm conferred by the Prince Regent of Belgium.

== See also ==
- List of World War II flying aces

== Bibliography ==
- Franks, Norman (2000). Royal Air Force Fighter Command Losses, Volume 3. Earl Shilton: Midland Counties. ISBN 1-85780-093-1.
- Shores, Christopher (1994). Aces High. London: Grub Street. ISBN 1-898697-00-0.
