= Thomas Wallace (RAF officer) =

South African Second World War flying ace

- Born: 5 October 1916; Johannesburg, Union of South Africa
- Died: 11 November 1944 (aged 28); Dunkirk, France
- Burial place: Pihen-Les Guines War Cemetery, France
- Military career
- Allegiance: United Kingdom
- Branch: Royal Air Force; Royal Air Force Volunteer Reserve
- Service years: 1939–1940 (RAF); 1940–1944 (RAFVR)
- Rank: Squadron Leader
- Service number: 149635
- Commands: No. 609 Squadron
- Conflicts: Second World War: Battle of Britain
- Awards: Distinguished Flying Medal

Thomas Young Wallace DFM (5 October 1916 – 11 November 1944) was a South African fighter pilot and flying ace of the Royal Air Force (RAF). He was credited with at least six aerial victories during the Second World War.

From Johannesburg, Wallace joined the RAF in 1939 and once his training was completed in June the following year was posted as a pilot officer to No. 610 Squadron. He lost his commission after a court-martial for being absent without leave but promptly joined the Royal Air Force Volunteer Reserve. He was posted to No. 111 Squadron and flying a Hawker Hurricane fighter achieved a number of aerial victories during the Battle of Britain. He spent the next three years of his war service in non-operational roles until September 1944, when he was given command of No. 609 Squadron. He was killed in action while flying a Hawker Typhoon fighter over Dunkirk in France.

== Early life ==
Born in Johannesburg, South Africa, on 5 October 1916, Thomas Young Wallace was the son of William Francis and Ruth Agnes Wallace. He left South Africa to join the Royal Air Force (RAF) in 1939, initially attending No. 7 Elementary & Reserve Flying Training School at Desford that August. Two months later, he was accepted into the RAF as a probationary acting pilot officer on a short service commission.

== Second World War ==
In November 1939, Wallace went to No. 6 Flying Training School at Little Rissington. After he finished his training in June 1940, he was posted to No. 610 Squadron. The squadron was based at Gravesend and operated the Supermarine Spitfire fighter. A few days after his arrival at the squadron, he went to Uxbridge for some short course training. During his time at Uxbridge, he was absent without leave for two days. Wallace was court-martialled and his commission in the RAF was terminated with effect from 1 July. Wallace promptly joined the Royal Air Force Volunteer Reserve (RAFVR) with the rank of sergeant before later in July being posted to No. 111 Squadron. Equipped with Hawker Hurricane fighters and flying from Croydon; the squadron was training replacement pilots following a period of service over France.

=== Battle of Britain ===
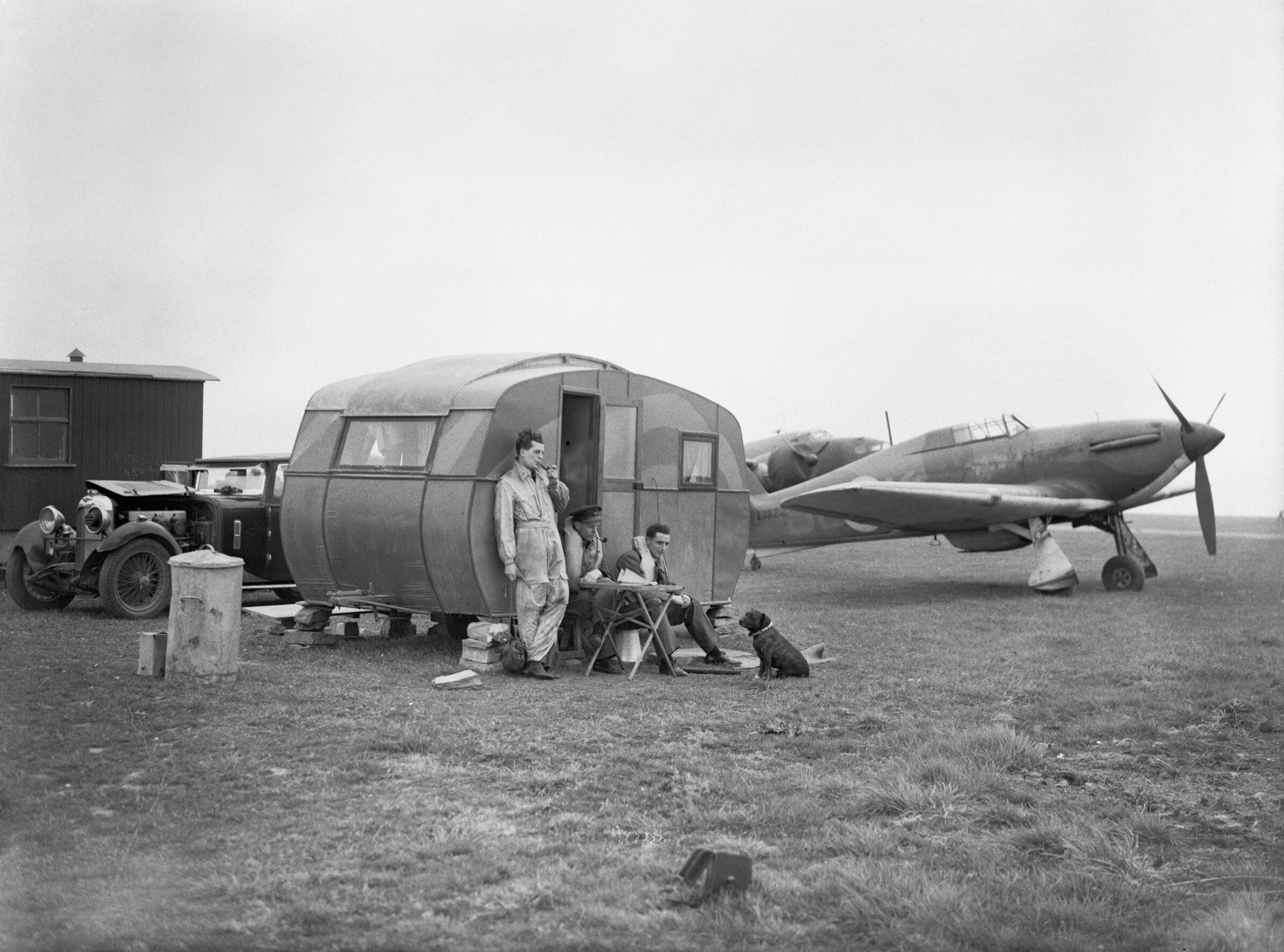
A Hawker Hurricane fighter of No. 111 Squadron on an airfield in the United Kingdom

Soon after Wallace's arrival, No. 111 Squadron returned to operations, patrolling south-east England as the Battle of Britain increased in intensity. On 15 August Wallace shot down two Messerschmitt Bf 110 heavy fighters and damaged two more; the next day he claimed a Messerschmitt Bf 109 fighter destroyed and probably shot down a Dornier Do 17 medium bomber. On 18 August, he destroyed a Do 17 and damaged two others. He damaged a Bf 109 on 24 August and then two days later shared in the destruction of a Do 17. On the final day of August, he shot down a Bf 110, damaged a second and claimed a Do 17 as a probable. On 4 September, he shot down a Bf 109 and damaged three others. Three days later, Wallace's Hurricane was damaged over the English Channel but he managed to get back to land before bailing out. His success in the previous three weeks saw him awarded the Distinguished Flying Medal (DFM) in October.

The published citation for his DFM read

In a period of three weeks, Sergeant Wallace has destroyed seven enemy aircraft and probably another four. On one occasion he became separated from his squadron and, single-handed, pursued a formation of enemy bombers back to the French coast. While in mid-channel he was attacked by six enemy fighters, and although his aircraft was severely damaged in the resulting battle, he shot down one enemy aircraft and damaged another. Sergeant Wallace has displayed conspicuous courage and fighting ability.

— London Gazette, No. 34978, 25 October 1940.

By the time of his DFM award, No. 111 Squadron had been transferred to Scotland, for a period of light duties following its intensive involvement in the Battle of Britain.

=== Later war service ===
Wallace shared in the damage of a Heinkel He 111 medium bomber while flying east of Peterhead on 3 November but this was his final aerial victory as he was then moved to a non-operational posting. Promoted to warrant officer, he was again commissioned in March 1943 as a pilot officer and six months later received a further promotion to flying officer. In September 1944, Wallace was given command of No. 609 Squadron. The squadron was flying Hawker Typhoon fighters in France as part of the Second Tactical Air Force, attacking German transports and supporting the Allied ground forces as they advanced into Belgium. Wallace was killed by flak on 11 November 1944 while flying over Dunkirk.

Wallace was buried at Pihen-les-Guines War Cemetery in the Pas-de-Calais, France. He is credited with having shot down six aircraft, with a share in one more destroyed. He also claimed two aircraft as probably destroyed and ten aircraft damaged, one of which was shared with other pilots. Two of the aircraft reported as damaged were identified as probables in his DFM citation.
