= John Curchin =

Australian flying ace

- Born: 20 January 1918; Hawthorne, Victoria, Australia
- Died: 4 June 1941 (aged 23); English Channel
- Military career
- Allegiance: Australia
- Branch: Royal Air Force
- Rank: Flight Lieutenant
- Unit: No. 609 Squadron
- Conflicts: Second World War; Battle of Britain; Channel Front
- Awards: Distinguished Flying Cross

John Curchin, DFC (20 January 1918 – 4 June 1941) was an Australian flying ace of the Royal Air Force (RAF) during the Second World War. He was credited with at least eight aerial victories.

Originally from Hawthorn in the Australian state of Victoria, Curchin joined the RAF in June 1939. After his training was completed, he was posted to the RAF's No. 600 Squadron. He was subsequently transferred to No. 609 Squadron and flew Supermarine Spitfire fighters in the Battle of Britain during which he achieved the majority of his victories. He later flew on the Channel Front and went missing, presumed killed, during a search and rescue operation.

== Early life ==
John Curchin was born on 20 January 1918 in Hawthorn, near Melbourne in the Australian state of Victoria. He was the son of Henry Wallace Curchin and Susannah Curchin, who later moved their family to the United Kingdom, settling in Enfield in the county of Middlesex. Curchin was educated at Merchant Taylor's School. He joined the Royal Air Force in June 1939, gaining entry via a short service commission. After gaining his wings in August, he was commissioned as an acting pilot officer on probation and proceeded to No. 5 Operational Training Unit for further training.

== Second World War ==
Curchin's acting rank of pilot officer was confirmed on 6 April 1940 although he remained on probation. His first operational posting was to No. 600 Squadron; his new unit was based at Northolt at the time and flew the Bristol Blenheim long-range fighter in a night fighter role. On 11 June Curchin was transferred to No. 609 Squadron, also at Northolt but equipped with the Supermarine Spitfire fighter. It had been heavily engaged in covering the evacuation of the British Expeditionary Force from Dunkirk. The following day, his probationary period ended and his pilot officer rank was made substantive.

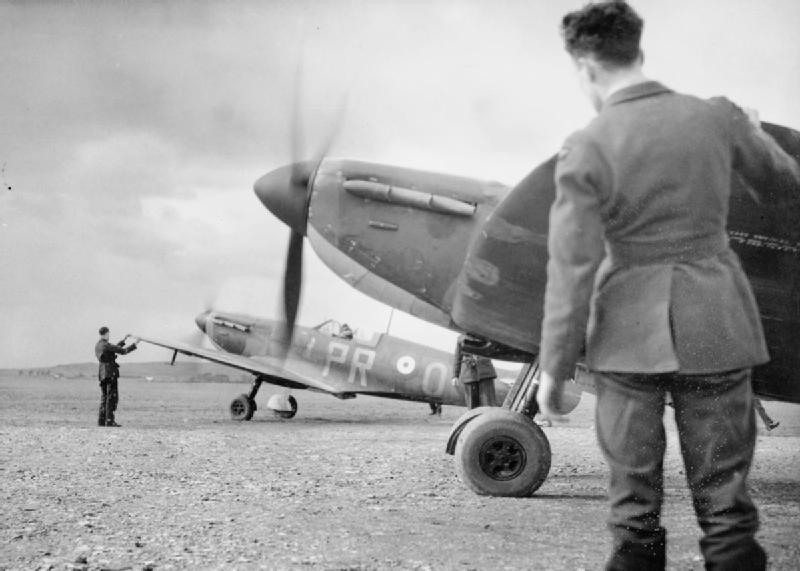
Spitfires of No. 609 Squadron, 1940

=== Battle of Britain ===
In early July No. 609 Squadron was moved to Middle Wallop, covering the Southampton and Portland area and flying protective patrols over the convoys in the area. On 12 July Curchin was one of three pilots to engage a Heinkel He 111 medium bomber 3 miles (4.8 km) to the east of Portland Bill. The He 111 was claimed as destroyed but this was unable to be verified. On 8 August he destroyed a Messerschmitt Bf 110 heavy fighter off the Isle of Wight and also damaged a Messerschmitt Bf 109 fighter in the same area. At the end of the month, he shot down a Bf 109 west of Portland.

By this time, the squadron was becoming more engaged in the aerial fighting over London. On 7 September Curchin destroyed a Bf 109 to the north of the city. He was also credited with the probable destruction of a Dornier Do 17 medium bomber the same day. He shared in shooting down two Do 17s on 15 September, the first to the east of London and the second to the north of Hastings. He shot down a Bf 109 some 15 miles (24 km) south of the Isle of Wight on 24 September and the following day destroyed two He 111s over Bristol. Another He 111 was destroyed by Curchin on 26 September.

The Luftwaffe's offensive operations against the United Kingdom began to wane in late October, by which time No. 609 Squadron had destroyed over a hundred enemy aircraft. Curchin finished the Battle of Britain with at least seven aerial victories, one of six Australian flying aces of the engagement. He was awarded the Distinguished Flying Cross (DFC); the citation, published in The London Gazette, read:

This officer has displayed great keenness and skill in combat against the enemy. On a recent occasion he pursued an enemy aircraft thirty miles out to sea and finally destroyed it. He has destroyed at least seven hostile aircraft and shared in the destruction of others.

— London Gazette, No. 34984, 1 November 1940

=== Channel Front ===
No. 609 Squadron spent the winter months at Warmwell before being transferred to Biggin Hill in February 1941. Now flying the Spitfire Mk II, it switched to offensive operations, carrying out Circus operations to occupied France. On 6 April, Curchin was promoted to flying officer. Now a flight commander, he shot down a Bf 109 over the English Channel on 8 May, and was also credited with a share in another Bf 109 destroyed the same day.

On 4 June, No. 609 Squadron was carrying out a search and rescue mission, looking for Flight Lieutenant George Gribble, of No. 54 Squadron, who had come down in the English Channel. The searching Spitfires were attacked by Bf 109s from Jagdgeschwader 53 (fighter wing 53) and Curchin failed to return to Biggin Hill after the resulting engagement. He was believed to have been shot down and killed. At the time of his death he held the rank of flight lieutenant and was credited with eight aircraft destroyed, shared in the destruction of another four aircraft, one probably destroyed, one damaged, and a shared in one unconfirmed aircraft destroyed.

With no known grave Curchin is commemorated on the Runneymeade Memorial at Englefield Green. As an Australian who died while serving in the armed forces of the United Kingdom, his name is also recorded in the commemorative roll at the Australian War Memorial in Canberra, Australia.
