= List of World War II aces from the United Kingdom =

This is a list of fighter aces in World War II from the United Kingdom and the British Empire (Country names as per name at the time of World War II). For other countries see List of World War II aces by country.

For "turret fighters" such as the Boulton Paul Defiant, the pilot put the aircraft into position with the enemy and it was the gunner who controlled the armament, air victories are credited to both.

== List ==
Name	Victories	Squadron(s)	Awards	Notes
Acworth, Richard Alvin	8	112, 80	DFC	
Agazarian, Noel Le Chavalier ("Aggy")	7	274, 609		KIA 16 May 1941, North Africa
Aitken, Sir John William Maxwell ("Max")	15	46, 68, 601	DSO, DFC	6 Victories in a Beaufighter; Became a Conservative MP
Allan, Ian	14	256, 151, 29	DSO, DFC, AFC	RAFVR. Retired in 1973 with rank of Air Commodore
Allard, Geoffrey ("Sammy")	24	85, 87	DFC, DFM*	KIFA 13 March 1941
Allen, Hubert Raymond ("Dizzy")	8	66	DFC	
Allen, John Laurance	8	54	DFC	KIA 24 July 1940
Allen, James Alan Sandeman ("Sandy")	7			
Allen, Derek Hurlestone	6	85	DFC	KIA 18 May 1940
Allen, Percy Frank	5	68		Flew a Beaufighter with N/RO (Note: N/RO = Navigator/Radar Operator) Bennett, G.
Andrew, James Richard	6	607	DFM	KIA 25 June 1945
Archer, Philip Leslie Irving	6		DFC	Born in Barbados, KIA 17 June 1943 flying with RCAF
Aries, Ellis Walter	6			
Ashton, John Henry	5			
Atkinson, Harold Derrick	12	213	DFC	KIA 25 August 1940
Ayerst, Peter Vigne	5	73, 33, 238, 124	DFC	
Ayre, Harold Woolgar ("Harry")	5			
Babbage, Cyril Fredrick	8	602, 41	DFM	
Bader, Douglas	22	222, 242, Tangmere Wing	DSO*, DFC*	Prisoner of war from 9 August 1941
Badger, John Vincent Clarence ("Tubby")	8		DFC	WIA 30 August 1940; DOW 30 June 1941
Baker, Henry Collingham ("Harry","Butch")	7	41, 19, 74		
Baldwin, John Robert ("Johnny")	15		DSO*, DFC*, AFC	Highest scorer on Typhoons. MIA during Korean War
Ball, George Eric	7		DFC	KIFA 1 February 1946
Bamberger, Cyril Stanley ("Bam")	5		DFC*, AE*	
Barclay, Richard George Arthur	8		DFC	KIA 17 July 1942
Barker, Frederick James	13	264	DFM*	Turret gunner on two-man Boulton Paul Defiant fighter piloted by Sgt. Edward "Ted" Thorn. Thorn and Barker were the top-scoring Defiant crew.
Bartley, Anthony Charles	12	92, 74, 65	DFC*	
Barton, Anthony Richard Henry	9	32, 126	DFC*	KIFA 4 April 1943
Barwell, Eric Gordon ("Dickie")	9	264, 125	DFC*	Flew a Boulton Paul Defiant during the Battle of Britain so his 5 first victories also credited to his air gunner P/O J.E.M. Williams, and the next 2 to Sgt. A. Martin. Barwell left the RAF on 2 September 1945 as a wing commander.
Bayne, Alfred William Alexander	11			
Bazin, James Michael	10			
Beamish, Victor	10		DSO*, DFC, AFC	KIA 28 March 1942
Beamont, Roland ("Bee")	9		DSO*, DFC*	Spent part of war as production test pilot for Hawker, responsible for introduction of Hawker Typhoon and Hawker Tempest into operational use
Beard, John Maurice Bentley	6	249	DFM, AFC	
Beaumont, Walter	8		DFC	MIA 23 September 1940
Beazley, Hugh John Sherard	6	249	DFC	
Bennions, George Herman ("Ben")	12	41	DFC	
Benson, James Gillies	10	141, 157	DSO, DFC*	
Berry, Ronald ("Ras")	14	603, 81	CBE, DSO, DFC*	
Bird-Wilson, Harold Arthur Cooper	9	17, 254, 118, 66, 152	DSO*, DFC*, AFC*	Retired in 1967 as an air vice-marshal
Bisdee, John	10	609, 601	OBE, DFC	
Blackadder, William Francis	7		DSO	
Blair, Kenneth Hughes	8	85, 151, 1453, 25, 613	DFC*	
Blake, Arthur Giles ("Admiral")	5			FAA, KIA 29 October 1940
Boardman, Hubert Stanley	5	600, 153	DFC	Flew a Beaufighter with N/RO F/Sgt James Roy Mordan
Boddington, Michael Christopher B.	11			
Bodie, Crelin Arthur W. ("Bogle")	11	66		KIFA 24 February 1942
Boitel-Gill, Derek Pierre Aumale	8	152	DFC	KIFA 18 September 1941
Boulter, John Clifford	6		DFC	KIA 17 February 1941
Boyd, Adrian Hope ("Ginger")	18	145, 501	DSO, DFC*	
Boyd, Archibald Douglas McNeill ("Archie")	10	600, 219	DSO, DFC	Flew a Beaufighter with N/RO Alexander Joseph Glegg
Boyd, Robert Finlay	21	54	DSO, DFC*	
Braham, John Randall Daniel ("Bob")	29	29, 51 OTU, 141	DSO**, DFC**, AFC	19 victories as a night fighter. Flew a Beaufighter with different N/RO's (Ross; Heywood; Gregory, W. S.; Jacobs, H.)
Bright, Vernon Maxwell	8			
Broadhurst, Harry	13		DSO*, DFC*, AFC	
Brothers, Peter Malam ("Pete")	16		DSO, DFC*	
Bruen, John Martin	8	800, 801, 802, 803	DSO, DSC	FAA
Bungey, Robert W.	5	226,145,452	DFC	Died 10 June 1943 in Australia. Bungey was an Australian
Burbridge, Bransome Arthur ("Branse")	21½	85	DSO*, DFC*	20 Victories as a night fighter
Burnell-Phillips, Peter Anthony	5	607	DFM	KIFA 9 February 1941
Butler, Thomas Roy	5	46	DFC	Flew a Beaufighter night fighter with N/RO Graham, R. F.
Butterfield, Samuel Leslie	5	213	DFM	KIA 11 August 1940
Caister, James Russell	6			
Caldwell, G. L.	7			
Cameron, Matthew	5			
Cameron, Neil	5			
Campbell, Francis	6			
Carey, Frank Reginald	28		DFC*, DFM, AFC	2nd highest Hurricane ace, did not fly after 1942
Carpenter, John Michael Vowles ("Chip")	8			
Cartridge, David Leslie	5			KIA 4 July 1940
Cartwright, Henry	5			
Casbolt, Charles Edward ("Cas")	13		DFM	
Casson, Lionel Horwood ("Buck")	5		DFC, AFC, AE*	
Chandler, Horatio Herbert	5			
Charlton, Philip Noel ("Freddie")	6			
Charney, Kenneth Langley	6			
Charnock, Harry Walpole	9		DFC, DFM, CdeG	Died 24 May 1974
Chase, Frederick John Allison	5			
Chisholm, Roderick Aeneas	9	604	DSO, DFC	Flew a Beaufighter with N/RO Ripley, W. G.
Chisholm, John Henry Mackellar	7			KIA 15 September 1944
Churchill, Walter Myers	6		DSO, DFC	KIA 26 August 1942
Clapperton, Raymond Hedley	0 (+22 V-1s)		DFC	22 V-1's destroyed
Cleaver, Gordon Neil S. ("Mouse")	7		DFC	
Clerke, Rupert Francis Henry	7	125	DFC	2 Victories in a Beaufighter with N/RO Wheldon, J. R.
Clift, Douglas Gerald ("Duggie")	5			
Clowes, Arthur Victor ("Taffy")	10		DFC, DFM	
Clyde, William Pancoast ("Billy")	10			
Cobley, Peter Charles	5	272	DFC*	2 Victories in a Beaufighter
Coghlan, John Hunter	6		DFC	KIA 17 August 1940
Cole, Robert Walton	0 (+20.75 V-1s)			
Cole, Robert Bruce	6			
Coleman, George Byrne Stanislaus	7	256, MNFU, 46, 272, 600	DFC	Flew a Beaufighter
Coleman, Patrick Tuisley	7			
Collard, Peter	6		DFC	KIA 14 August 1940
Comely, Peter Woodruff	5			MIA 15 August 1940
Connors, Stanley Dudley Pierce	12		DFC*	KIA 18 August 1940
Constable-Maxwell, Michael Hugh	7	604	DSO, DFC	2 Victories in a Beaufighter
Conway, Alfred Gordon	7		DFC	
Cook, Harry	6			
Cooke, Charles Alfred	5	66, 264	DFC	Retired on 11 July 1958 as a squadron leader.
Cooke, Nicholas Gresham ("Lanky")	12	264	DFC	Flew a Boulton Paul Defiant so all victories also credited to his air gunner, Cpl. A. Lippett. On 29 May 1940 during the Dunkirk evacuation they claimed 2 Messerschmitt Bf 109's and a Messerschmitt Bf 110 during their 1st sortie, plus 5 Junkers Ju 87's in their 2nd that day, becoming Britain's first "aces in a day" in the Second World War. KIA 31 May 1940
Cooper-Slipper, Thomas Paul Michael	8		DFC	
Cork, Richard John ("Dickie")	11		DSO, DSC	flew with RAF and FAA, KIA 14 April 1944
Corre, Howard John	5			
Cosby, Ivor Henry	8		DFC	
Cotes-Preedy, Digby Vawdre Cartmel ("Digger")	12		GM, DFC	
Cottingham, Leonard	14			
Cox, Graham James	11			
Cox, David George Samuel Richardson	8		DFC	
Cox, Neill Dudley	5	39	DFC*	4 Victories in a Beaufighter
Craig, John Teasdale ("Bobby")	8		DFM	KIA 2 June 1941
Creed, Ernest William Durham ("Bill")	11		DFC	
Crew, Edward Dixon	12	604	DSO*, DFC*, CB	8 Victories in a Beaufighter with N/RO's Guthrie, Norman and Duckett, Basil
Crook, David Moore	8		DFC	KIA 18 December 1944
Crosley, R. Michael ("Mike")	5			
Cross, Robert Walter	10			
Crossley, Michael Nicholson	22		DSO, DFC	
Crowley-Milling, Denis	6		DSO, AE, DFC*	
Cruikshank, A. R.	11			
Cullen, Richard Nigel ("Ape")	12		DFC	KIA 4 March 1941
Cunningham, John ("Cats Eyes")	20	604, 85	DSO, AE, DFC*	19 Victories in a Beaufighter night fighter with N/RO's Phillipson, J. R and Rawnsley, C. F.
Cunningham, Wallace ("Jock")	8		DFC	
Currant, Christopher Frederick ("Bunny")	15		DSO, DFC*, MiD*, CdeG (Belgium)	
Czernin, Count Manfred Beckett	18		DSO, MC, DFC	Son of an Austrian diplomat. From 1943 operated in occupied Europe for the SOE.
Daber, John	5			
Daddo-Langlois, William Raoul	6			WIA 10 June 1943 over Sicily, DOW same day. Born England. Commemorated on Malta Plinth
Dafforn, Robert Chippindall	8	501, 229	DFC	KIA 9 September 1943
Dahl, Roald	5	80		
Dalton-Morgan, Thomas Frederick	17	43	DFC	
Daniels, Stephen Walter ("Dan")	17			
Daniel, Edward Gough Esq. ("Tubby")	11	1435 Flt	DFC	7 Victories in a Beaufighter with N/RO Missing presumed KIA 5 July 1944, aged 23
Darley, Horace Stanley ("George")	5	609 (S/Ldr)		
Darling, Edward Vivian ("Mitzi")	6	41	DFC	MIA 2 June 1942
David, William Dennis	17	87, 213	CBE, DFC*, AFC, MiD	
Davidson, Henry John	7	249		KIFA 6 October 1942
Davies, James William Elias	8			
Davis, Charles Trevor	10	238		KIFA 26 March 1941
Davison, Michael Metcalfe	13	46, 108	DFC*	8 Victories in a Beaufighter with N/RO Dye, Bertram E.
Daw, Victor George ("Jack")	6			
Dawson-Paul, Francis	7.5	64		FAA voluntarily seconded to RAF. Joined squadron 1 July 1940. Died of wounds on 30 July 1940, five days after shot down.
De L'Ara, Louis George Charles	5			
Deacon, Albert Henry	6	85, 111, 261		
Dean, Ernest Henry ("Dixie")	5			
Deanesley, Edward Christopher ("Jumbo")	6			
Denholm, George Lovell	6	603 (S/Ldr)		
Dewar, John Scatliff	9		DSO, DFC	India, KIA 12 September 1940
Dixon, Henry Peter	5			
Dobie, Ian Alexander	14			
Dodds, James ("Hamish")	13	274		
Doe, Robert Francis Thomas	16	234	DSO, DFC*	
Doll, John Christopher Shaboe	5			
Donaldson, Edward Mortlock	6	151	DSO, AFC*, LOM	
Donaldson, Georges Millar ("Paddy")	6			
Donaldson, Arthur Hay	5			
Douglas, William Anderson	6			
Dovell, Ronald Leonard	6	242 squadron	DFM	FLT SGT
Downing, Alwyn Berriman ("Berry")	12	600		Flew a Beaufighter with N/RO John P. Lyons
Drake, Billy	22	213, 421 Flt	DSO, DFC*	
Draper, Bryan Vincent	6	74	DFC	KIA 28 February 1945
Dredge, Alan Sydney	9			
Drummond, John Fraser	9	46, 92	DFC	KIA 10 October 1940
Dryland, Rodney 'Rod'	20		DFC	
Duke, Neville Frederick	29		DSO, DFC**, AFC	
Duke-Wooley, Raymond Myles Beecham	7	253, 23	DFC	American
Duncan-Smith. Wilfred George Gerald	19		DSO*, DFC**	
Dundas, Hugh Spencer Lisle ("Cocky")	10	616	DSO*, DFC	Brother of John Dundas
Dundas, John Charles	16	609	DFC	KIA 28 November 1940 Brother of Hugh Dundas.
Dunn, Patrick Hunter ("Paddy")	9			
Dunning-White, Peter William	5			
Durnford, Peter Edward George	5			
Dutton, Roy Gilbert	19	145	DFC	Ceylon
Dymond, William Lawrence	11	111	DFM	KIA 2 September 1940
Dyson, Charles Harold	9			
Eagle, William Geoffrey	7	274, 198	DFC	KIA 30 June 1945
Eckford, Alan Francis	12	32, 242, 253, 154	DFC	
Edgar, A. H.	6			
Edge, Gerald Richmond	20		DFC	
Edghill, Douglas Frank Kitchener	7	229	DFC	
Edll, Frank Eric	6			
Edwards, Edward Walter	8			
Edwards, Henry Grahame ("Nick")	7	604, 89, 108	DFC	Squadron Leader. A Malta night fighter ace. Flew a Beaufighter with N/RO Phillipson, J. R. Also received two King's Commendations for Brave Conduct. Recommended for the George Medal for saving a cadet from a burning aircraft in 1941. KIFA aged 30 in an air crash over Malta on 6 May 1943. Buried in the Malta (Cappucini) Naval Cemetery.
Edwards, Malcolm Finney ("Eddie")	12	247, 587, 3		Served with 247 Sqn during the B.O.B. KIA 29 December 1944 whilst flying Hawker Tempest JF-V, EJ803, of 3(f) Sqn. Crashed into moorland next to the railroad track near the town of Spelle, Germany.
Ekbery, Joseph Scarisbrick	6			
Elcock, Arthur Richard ("Big")	8	91		KIFA 14 May 1945
Eliot, Hugh William ("Chubby")	9	255		2 Victories in a Beaufighter with N/RO Ibbotson, D. R.
Ellis, John	15		DFC	
Ellis, Ronald Vernon ("Monty")	7			
Elsdon, Thomas Arthur F. ("Jimmy")	9			
Ensor, Philip Stephen Baddesly	5	23	DFC	
Etherton, John Hill	6	89		Flew a Beaufighter
Evans, Charles L. G. ("Crash")	10			
Evans, Kenneth William Samuel	6			
Evans, George	5			
Everson, L. G.	7	3		
Eyre, Anthony	10	615; 132 Wing	DFC	Stalag Luft III 1942–1945; KIFA 16 February 1946
Farnes, Paul Caswell Powe	8	501	DFM	
Farquhar, Andrew Douglas	5	257	DFC	
Faulkner, J. A.	7	91		
Feary, Alan Norman	5	609		KIA 7 October 1940
Ferriss, Henry Michael	11	111	DFC	KIA 16 August 1940
Finlay, Donald Osborne	6	41, 54		
Finucane, Brendan Eamon Fergus ("Paddy")	32	65, 452 RAAF, 602	DSO, DFC**	KIA 15 July 1942 in Ramrod mission over France. ( Irish)
Flinders, John Layton ("Polly")	6	32		
Fokes, Ronald Henry ("Ronnie")	13	92, 257	DFC	KIA 12 June 1944
Forbes, Athol Stanhope	9	303, 66		
Forster, Anthony Douglas ("Bunny")	6	151, 607	DFM	
Foster, J. K.	6			
Foster, Reginald John ("Jack")	9	604, 108		4 Victories in a Beaufighter with N/RO Newton, M. F.
Foster, Robert William	7	605	DFC	
Foster, William Morley Culver	5			
Fowlow, Norman Ralph	5			Newfoundland
Franklin, William Henry	16	65	DFM*	MIA 12 December 1940
Fras(i)er, Joseph Frederick	10			Ceylon
Freeborn, John Connell	14	74	DFC*	
Friendship, Alfred Henry Basil	8	3	DFM	
Fulford, David	4	64, 19	DFC	KIA 2 November 1942
Garden, Mowbray	5			(1914–1978)
Gardner, Peter Melvill	10		DFC	(1918–1984)
Gardner, Richard Exton ("Jimmy")	10			(1914–1999) FAA
Garton, Geoffrey William	10		DSO, DFC	(1915–1976)
Gash, Fred	5	264	DFM	Turret gunner on two-man Boulton Paul Defiant fighter piloted by P/O F.D. Hughes; Sergeant Warrant Officer in May 1943 and released from the RAF in 1945 as a flight lieutenant
Geddes, Keith Irvine	5	604	DFC,	Flew a Beaufighter (1918–1991)
Genders, George E. Clifford ("Jumbo")	10			(1920–1950)
Gibb, Walter Frame	6		DSO, DFC	(1919–2006)
Gibbs, Eric Malcom	6		DFC	(1912–1972)
Giddings, Kenneth Charles Michael	5		KCB, OBE, DFC, AFC*	(1920–2009)
Gilbert, Humphrey Trench	5		DFC	(1919–1942) KIFA 2 May 1942
Gilders, John Stanley	6			(1919–1941) KIA 21 February 1941
Gillam, Denys Edgar	8		DSO**, DFC*, AFC	(1915–1991)
Gillan, James	7			(1914–1940) MIA 11 August 1940
Gillies, James	6			
Gillies, Kenneth McLeod	10	66		KIA 4 October 1940
Gilmour, William MacMillan	9			
Gilroy, George Kemp ("Sheep")	24		DSO, DFC*	(1914–1995)
Gleed, Ian Richard	16		DFC	KIA 16 April 1943
Glen, Arthur Allan ("Pinkie")	9			
Glendinning, John Nixon	5			KIA 12 March 1941
Glew, Norman Vipan ("Sticky")	6			KIA 17 May 1944
Gloster, Michael John	11	255	DFC*	5 Victories in a Beaufighter with N/RO Oswald, James F.
Godfrey, Donald Ling	10			
Goode, J.	7			
Goodman, George Ernest ("Randy")	16		DFC	KIA 14 June 1941
Goodman, Geoffrey Horace	9	29	DSO, DFC	1 Victory in a Beaufighter with N/RO Wall, R. C. B.
Goucher, Richard Tannatt	7			
Gough, William John	8	68		1 Victory in a Beaufighter with N/RO Matson
Gould, Derrick Leslie	5			
Gracie, Edward John ("Jumbo")	10		DFC	KIA 15 February 1944
Graham, Michael	6			
Grant, Stanley Bernard	7			
Gray, William Napier	5			
Greaves, Douglas Haig	9	255	DFC*	5 Victories in a Beaufighter with N/RO Robbins, F. Milton; Borb 4 April 1917 Leeds. Died Nov 2006
Green, Charles Patrick ("Paddy")	14	600	DSO, DFC	9 Victories in a Beaufighter with N/RO Gillies, Reginald Joseph. Died 10 April 1999
Green, Wilfrith Peter	7		DSO, DFC	
Greenwood, John Peter Bowtell	9			
Gregory, Donald Swift	8			
Gregory, William	6			
Gribble, Dorian George	7		DFC	MIA 4 June 1941
Grice, Douglas Hamilton ("Grubby")	8		DFC	
Grier, Thomas	12		DFC	KIA 5 December 1941
Griffiths, Glyn	10		DFM	
Gunnis, Herbert H. Kitchener ("Alec")	5	252		Flew a Beaufighter
Guthrie, Giles Connop McEachern	5			
Guy, Leonard Northwood ("Len")	7			MIA 18 August 1940
Hackwood, Gerald Henry	8	264		Flew a Boulton Paul Defiant so all victories also credited to his air gunner LAC G.E. Lille. KIFA 20 November 1940
Hagger, Ronald Arthur	7			
Haine, Richard Cummins	5			
Haines, Leonard Archibald	12		DFC	KIA 30 April 1941
Hall, Archibald Robert ("Bobbie")	8	56, 126, 260, 322	DFC	
Hall, John Anthony Sanderson	8		DFC*	
Hallett, Nigel George ("Buster")	6			
Hallowes, Herbert James L. ("Darkie")	19		DFC, DFM*	
Hamar, Jack Royston	6		DFC	KIA 24 July 1940
Hamblin, B. W.	5			
Hamilton, Claud Eric ("Hamish")	6		MiD	KIA 14 May 1941 ( Malta)
Hamlyn, Ronald Fairfax	11			One of four pilots that became an "ace in a day"" in the Battle of Britain, (Note: The four aces in a day were Archie McKellar, Ronald Hamlyn, New Zealander Brian Carbury and Antoni Głowacki of Poland.)
Hanbury, Osgood Villiers	12	602, 260	DSO, DFC*	KIA 3 June 1943
Hancock, John Allan	7			
Hanks, Peter Prosser	15			
Hardacre, John Reginald	5			KIA 30 September 1940
Hards, Maurice Sydney	10	250, 92	DFC, DFM	Later Chief Inspector of Police (Reserve) in Kenya
Harker, Alan Stuart ("Budge")	7			
Harries, Raymond Hiley	24		DFC*	KIFA 14 May 1950
Harrison, Geoffrey Austen	5			KIA 12 June 1944
Hart, Kenneth Graham	9		DFC	KIA 28 December 1944 ( Italy)
Hartley, James	12			
Hastings, I.	5			
Havercroft, Ralph Edward	6	92		
Haw, Charlton ("Wag")	5	504, 81, 122, 611, 129	DFM, DFC, Order of Lenin	Served with 151 Wing in Russia. Retired as Squadron Leader in 1951. Died 1993.
Hay, Ronald Cuthbert	13		DSO, DSC*	Sole Royal Marine fighter ace
Hayden, Lawrence Hamilton	7	264	DFM	Turret gunner on two-man Boulton Paul Defiant fighter piloted by P/O T.D. Welsh. Released from the RAF in 1945 as a flight lieutenant.
Hayley-Bell, Dennis	5	68		2 Victories in a Beaufighter
Hayward, Robert Kitchener	6			Born in Newfoundland
Head, Norman Sidney	11			
Hearne, Peter Joseph	5			Born in India
Hedgecoe, Edward Richard	9		DFC*	KIA 1 January 1944
Henley, Robert Stephen	5	806 NAS	DSC	Fleet Air Arm. Norway, Dunkirk, Mediterranean, Pacific
Heppell, Phillip W. Ellis ("Nip")	5			
Hetherington, Erik Lawson	5		DFC	KIFA 31 October 1942 ( Gibraltar)
Hewett, Edward William F. ("Ted")	16	80	DFM, AFC	
Hibbert, Walter James ("Jesse")	6		DFC	
Higgins, William Burley	5			KIA 14 September 1940
Higginson, Frederick William ("Taffy")	12			
Hill, Howard Perry	6			
Hillary, Richard Hope	5	603		KIFA 7 January 1943 (night training flight)
Hoare, Bertie R. O'Bryen ("Sammy")	9	23, 605	DSO*, DFC*	KIFA 26 March 1947
Hobbs, Joseph Bedo	7			
Hodgkinson, Arthur John ("Hodge")	12	219, 264, 23	DSO, DFC*	KIA 10 July 1943 ( Italy)
Hogan, Henry Algernon Vickers	8		DFC	
Hogg, Graham Angus	12		DSC*	FAA. KIA 11 November 1940
Hogg, Richard Malzard	6			KIA 25 August 1940
Hogg, Robert Dudley	5			
Holden, Eustace J. ("Gus")	7			
Holden, Kenneth	6			
Holder, Maurice Henry ("Blondie")	5			KIFA 16 July 1942
Holland, Robert Hugh	6			Born in Ceylon
Hollingsworth, Alec	5			
Honor, Dudley Sandry Garton	9	88, 145, 274, 258 Wg	DFC*	Service number: 40113. Was born at Quilmes, Buenos Aires, Argentina Died in 2007
Hope, Sir Archibald Philip	6	601	OBE, DFC	
Hopewell, James	5			KIA 21 January 1942
Hopkin, William P. ("John Willie")	5			
Horne, Angus William	7	219, 6		Flew a Beaufighter with N/RO Rex Browne
Howard, Donald Ridgwell ("Podge")	6			
Howard-Williams, Peter Ian	5			
Howell, Frank Jonathan	10	25, 80, 609, 118, 243, 54	DFC*	KIFA when hit by a taxiing Vampire, 9 May 1948
Howes, Harold Norman ("Harry")	12		DFM	KIFA 22 December 1940
Howitt, Geoffrey Leonard	8			
Hubbard, Thomas Edward ("Tom")	5			
Hughes, David Price	5			
Hughes, Dennis Lawrence	5			KIA
Hughes, Fredrick Desmond	19	264, 145, 600, 604	DFC*, DSO	Flew a Boulton Paul Defiant during the B.O.B. so his 5 first victories also credited to his air gunner Sgt. F. Gash. 12 Victories in a Beaufighter with N/RO Dixon, L. Hughes was awarded the DFC (1954), made a CBE (1962), CB (1972) and retired on 6 June 1974 as an air vice-marshal. Died on 11 January 1992.
Hughes-Rees, John Anthony ("David")	5			
Hull, Bernard John ("Johnnie")	5			
Humpherson, John Bernard William	5		DFC	KIA 22 June 1941
Humphrey, Andrew Henry	5		GCB, OBE, DFC, AFC**	Marshal of the Royal Air Force
Hunter, Philip Algernon	10	264	DSO	Flew a Boulton Paul Defiant so all victories also credited to his air gunner LAC F.H. King; KIA 24 August 1940
Hurst, John	5			
Hussey, Roy Jack Hubert	14			
Ibbotson, Desmond	11	54, 112, 601	DFC*	KIA 19 November 1944
Ingle, Alec	5		DFC, AFC, AE	POW from 11 September 1943
Inniss, Aubrey Richard de Lisle	9	236, 248	DFC	. Barbados, British West Indies. 2 Victories in a Beaufighter.
Jacobs, Henry	8			
Jay, Dudley Trevor	9		DFC, MiD	KIA 24 October 1940
Jeffery, Alistair John Oswald	5			
Jefferies, Charles G. StDavid ("Porky")	6			
Jennings, Bernard James	5			
Jeram, Dennis Mayvore	6			
Johnson, Herbert Dennis	14	91		
Johnson, James Edgar ("Johnnie")	38		DSO**, DFC*, CB, CBE, DFC (US), Air Medal (US), Legion of Merit (US)	Top British ace of the war, retired air vice-marshal
Johnson, Stanley B.	11	264		Turret gunner on two-man Boulton Paul Defiant fighter piloted by P/O M.H. Young; KIA 31 May 1940
Johnson, William John ("John")	7			
Johnston, Hugh Anthony Stephen ("Tim")	6			
Johnstone, Alexander Vallance Riddell ("Sandy")	9		DFC	Retired with the rank of air vice-marshal
Joll, Ian Kenneth Sefton	5	604	DFC	4 Victories in a Beaufighter with N/RO O'Leary M.
Jones, Edward Gordon ("Tap")	6		DSO, DFC	
Jones, Norman Garston	7			
Jonsson, Thorsteinn Elton ("Tony")	5		DFM	Icelandic National
Josling, Norman Herbert ("Jos")	6		DFC	
Judd, Michael Thomas	5		DSO, DFC, AFC	
Kayll, Joseph Robert ("Joe")	13		DSO, DFC, AE	
Keele, Brian Rushworth	6	604		5 Victories in a Beaufighter with N/RO Cowles, George H.
Keighley-Peach, Charles Lindsay	5			
Kellet, Ronald Gustave	5		DFC, DSO, AE*	
Kelsey, Howard Charles	9	141		4 Victories in a Beaufighter with N/RO Smith, Edward M.
Kendall, Philip Stanley	8	255		5 Victories in a Beaufighter with N/RO Hill, C. R.
Kettlewell, George Victor Wildeman	5			
Kilburn, Michael Plaistowe	7	124, 56	DFC, CdeG,	Irish
Kilmartin, John Ignatus ("Killy")	14		DFC	Irish
Kilner, Joseph Richard	6			
King, Frederick Harry	10	264	DFM	Turret gunner on two-man Boulton Paul Defiant fighter piloted by S/Ldr P.A. Hunter; KIA 24 August 1940
King, George James ("Jimmy")	7			
Kingaby, Donald Ernest	23		DSO, AFC, DFM	
Kingcome, Charles Brian Fabris	12		DFC*, DSO	
Kinmonth, Michael William	7	89		Flew a Beaufighter with N/RO Edgar
Kitchener, Herbert Horatio	6			
Kynaston, Norman Arthur	5	91	DFC*	Also 17 V-1s destroyed, MIA 15 August 1944
Lacey, James Harry ("Ginger")	28		CdeG, DFM*	
Lamb, Deryck Percy	9			
Lamb, Peter Gilbert	5		AFC	
Lane, Brian John Edward ("Sandy")	7		DFC	MIA 13 December 1942
Lapsley, John Hugh	11			
Latimer-Jefferies, Jerrard	9		DFC	Latimer-Jefferies was killed on 15 April 1943, as a Squadron Leader with 106 Squadron, flying in a Lancaster and is buried in Sauvillers-Mongival Communal Cemetery along with the other crew members who were lost.
Laws, Adrian Francis	5		DFM	KIFA in training accident 30 September 1940
Lawson, Walter John	7			KIA 28 August 1941
Le Cheminant, Jerrold ("Chem")	6		DFC, OBE	Retired in 1972 with the rank of wing commander
Leary, David Cooper	8			
Leathart, James Anthony Leathart ("The Prof")	8	89	DSO	1 Victory in a Beaufighter with N/RO Glass, G. J. Retired from RAF in 1962 at the rank of Air Commodore
Leather, William Johnson	7			
Lee, Kenneth Norman Thomas ("Hawkeye")	7		DFC	
Lee, Richard Hugh Antony ("Dickie")	11		DSO, DFC	KIA 18 August 1940
Lee-Knight, Roland Anthony	6		DFC	KIA 27 September 1941
Lefevre, Peter William ("Pip")	10		DFC	MIA 6 February 1944
Libbert, Albert	12			
Lille, George Edward	8	264		Turret gunner on two-man Boulton Paul Defiant fighter piloted by P/O G.H. Hackwood. Retired from the RAF on 18 December 1957 as a squadron leader, retaining the rank of wing commander.
Lindsay, William Roy Mackintosh	6			
Linnard, Sidney ("Sid")	7			
Lippett, Albert	12	264	DFM	Turret gunner on two-man Boulton Paul Defiant fighter piloted by F/C N.G. Cooke; On 29 May 1940 during the Dunkirk evacuation, they claimed two Messerschmitt Bf 109 fighter and a Messerschmitt Bf 110 during their 1st sortie, plus five Junkers Ju 87 Stukas in their 2nd that day, becoming Britain's first "aces in a day" in the Second World War. KIA 31 May 1940
Llewellyn, Reginald Thomas	15		DFM	
Lock, Eric Stanley ("Sawn Off Lockie")	26		DSO, DFC*, MiD	MIA 3 August 1941
Lockwood, G.	7			
Lofts, Keith Temple	7			
Lord, Geoffrey	7			
Lott, Charles George	5		CB, CBE, DSO, DFC, MiD	Retired as air vice-marshal
Lovell, Anthony Desmond Joseph	22		DSO*, DFC*	born in Ceylon, KIFA 17 August 1945
Lovell, Victor Charles	5			
Lowe, Ivan Lawrence Firth	6			
Lucas, Norman John	5			
Lucy, William Paulet	7		DSO	KIA May 1940
Lyall, Archibald ("Pat")	6			KIA 28 November 1940
MacArthur, James Henry Gordon	8			
MacDonald, Harold Kennedy	8			KIA 28 August 1940
MacDonald-Hall, Robert ("Sam")	7			
MacDonell, Aeneas Ranald Donald	10			
McDowall, Andrew	13		DFM*	Later became the first leader of an RAF jet fighter squadron (616)
McGrath, John Keswick Ulick Blake	18		DFC	
McIntosh, Wallace	8			
McKay, Donald Alistair Stewart	17		DFM*	
McKellar, Archie	20		DSO, DFC*	One of four pilots that became an "ace in a day"" in the Battle of Britain. KIA 1 November 1940
Mackenzie, Kenneth	13	501, 247	DFC, AFC	
McKinley, G. M.	5			
MacLachlan, James Archibald Findlay	17		DSO, DFC,	Flew with one arm after amputation in Feb 1941; POW, 1943; Died in captivity
McLardy, W. A.	8			
MacLaren, William Ross	9			
McClean, Tom Joseph	9			
McMullen, Desmond Annesley Peter	22	54, 222, 151	DFC**	
McPherson, Robert Reid	5			
Macqueen, Norman Carter	9			
Maguire, William Hudson	6			
Malan, Adolf Gysbert ("Sailor")	27	74, Biggin Hill Wing	DSO*, DFC*	
Mallinson, James Robin	5	74 452 71 242	DFM	MIA nr Cap Rosa 2–1–43
Manger, Kenneth	8			
Mann, Jack	5			
Marland, Rainford Gent	7			
Marples, Roy	7			
Marrs, Eric Simcox ("Boy")	11	152	DFC	KIA 24 July 1941 aged 20
Marshall, Alfred Ernest	18	73, 250, 25	DFC, DFM	KIFA 27 November 1944
Marshall, William Cyril	9		DFC	
Martin, Richard Frewen	8			
Mason, Ernest Mitchelson ("Imshi")	17	112, 80, 274, 94	DFC	KIA 15 February 1942
Mason, Frank	5			
Masterman, Cedric Audley	6	227		3 Victories in a Beaufighter with N/RO Burnside, G. B.
Mathews, John Owen ("Jimmy")	14			
Matthews, Peter Gerald Hugh	9			
Mayne, Ernest	5			
Meager, Patrick Edward	9	107, 41, 602, 211	DFC, DSO	5 Victories in a Beaufighter. Promoted group captain in 1945.
Meaker, James Reginald Bryan	8	46,263,249		(Irish). KIA 27 September 1940
Measures, William Edward G. ("Tink")	5			
Mellersh, Francis Richard Lee ("Togs")	8	600	DFC*	8 Victories as in a Beaufighter nightfighter
Mellor, Frank	5	111	DFM	Killed in Action 3 July 1945
Melville-Jackson, George Holmes	5	248	DFC	Flew a Beaufighter
Miller, Wilfred Handel ("Andy")	11	125		3 Victories in a Beaufighter with N/RO Bone, F. C.
Miller, Reginald Arthur ("Dusty")	7	1435 Flt		4 Victories in a Beaufighter with N/RO Tearle, Francis J.
Millington, William Henry	11	79, 249		
Mills, Jack Percival	5			
Milne, Richard Maxwell	15			
Mitchell, Richard Angelo ("Mitch")	8			
Moberley, George Edward	5			
Modera, John Raymond Stewart	6	227		5 Victories in a Beaufighter with N/RO Hodges
Moore, Arthur Robert	4+1sh (+23+1sh V-1's)	3	DFC*	
More, James Winter C. ("Hank")	6			
Morfill, Percy Frederick ("Peter")	6		DFM	
Morris, Douglas Griffith ("Zulu")	6	406		4 Victories in a Beaufighter with N/RO Rix, A. V.
Morris, Thomas Charles ("Tom")	5			
Mortimer-Rose, Edward Brian	13			
Morton, James Storrs ("Black")	10	603, 54, 539, 219		2 Victories in a Beaufighter with N/RO Bailey, C.
Mottram, Roy	5	92, 54		KIA 31/8/1941 Neuf-Berquin, France Nord
Mould, Peter William Olbert ("Boy")	11		DFC*	MIA 1 October 1941 after an air battle with Italian Macchi C.202s North of Gozo, Malta
Muirhead, Ian James	7			
Mulliner, Reginald W. L.	5		DFC*	
Mungo-Park, John Colin	13		DFC*	KIA 27 June 1941. Credited with 600th victory for Biggin Hill with H.M. Stephen – their pairing was known as the "Deadly Twins."
Musgrave, John Gothorp	12			
Nash, Peter Alfred	12			
Nash, Raymond Stanley	2+1sh (+17+3sh V-1's)	23,91,1	DFC	
Neil, H. M.	5			
Neil, Thomas Francis ("Ginger")	16		DFC, AFC, AE	
Nelson-Edwards, George Hassall ("Hal")	6		DFC	
Newbery, Richard Alfred	13		DFC*	
Newhouse, Peter Saxton	5	600	DFC	Flew a Beaufighter with N/RO Tate, Gerald
Newling, Michael Alan	5		DFC	KIA 6 July 1941
Niblett, John	5			
Nicholls, Henry Treweeke	6			
Nicholls, John Hamilton	7		DFC	
Niven, John Brown	9	602,485,322	DFC and Bar	Died 1986
Norris, Stanley Charles	9		DFC	
Norwell, John King ("Jock")	7		AFC	
Nowell, Gareth Leofric	11	87, 32	DFM*, AE	
O'Brien, Joseph Somerton	5	92, 234	DFC	KIA 7 September 1940
O'Meara, James Joseph ("Orange")	13	64, 72, 421 Flt	DSO, DFC*	
O'Neil, John Anthony	5		DFC	
O'Sullivan, Kevin Thomas Anthony	5	255		3 Victories in a Beaufighter with N/RO Hood, W. G.
Oldham, R.	5			
Oliver, John Oliver William	8			
Olver, Peter	6		DFC	Shot down, captured and made POW 11 June 1943; . Died 14 February 2013
Orr, Stanley Gordon	17		DSC**, AFC	Top Royal Navy ace
Orton, Newell ("Fanny")	17	73, 242, 54	DFC*	Born Warwick, KIA 17 September 1941.
Osborne, Anthony Frederick	7			
Osgood-Finney, Macleod Hamish	6			
Ottewill, Peter Guy	7			
Overton, Charles Nevill	6		DFC	
Owen, Alan Joseph ("Red")	15	600, 85	DFC*	6 Victories in a Beaufighter with N/RO S.V. (Vic) MacAllister; North Africa, then bomber support and intruder operations over Germany
Oxspring, Robert Wardlow	21		DFC**, AFC	
Page, Alan Geoffrey	15		DSO, DFC*	
Pain, Derek Sydney	5	68, 89		Flew a Beaufighter with N/RO Briggs, John Victor
Palliser, George Charles Calder	11		DFC	
Palmer, Arthur G.	5			
Panter, Keith Vernon	6			
Pargeter, Reginald Clive	5			
Parker, Gartrell Richard Ian ("Sailor")	9 (+ 5 V-1's)	219	DFC*, AFC, DSM, MiD (twice), King's Commendation	219 Sqn top scorer. Test pilot post-war, KIFA 19 February 1963.
Parker, Bernard James ("Jimmy")	5			
Parker, Dennis Coates	5			
Parker, Thomas Campbell ("John")	6			
Parker-Rees, Alastair	12			
Parnall, Denis Geach	6			KIA 18 September 1940
Parrott, Peter Lawrence	9		DFC*, AFC	Retired as a wing commander in 1965, Died 2003
Parsons, Claude Arthur	5			KIA 8 November 1941
Passy, Cyril Wolrich	5			
Paton, Donald Pearson	5	600, 114	DFC*	Flew a Beaufighter with N/RO's John McAnulty and Alec William; Acting Wing Commander. Squadron Leader retaining rank of wing commander
Pattullo, William Blair	5			WIA 26 October 1940
Paul, Frank Dawson	6			FAA, WIA 30 July 1940
Paul, Harold George ("Ginger")	6			
Pavey, Alan Francis	7	122	DFC	KIA 27 July 1944 Normandy
Payne, A. D. ("Jammy")	5			
Payne, William John	9			
Payton, James Joseph ("Joe")	7			
Peacock, Reginald John	5	122	DFC	KIA 5 February 1943 (North Africa)
Pedley, Michael George Foxter	5			
Pelling, Alfie Lucas	5		DFC	
Pegge, Constantine Oliver Joseph	9			
Phillips, James William Bristowe	6	54	DFM	KIFA 25 March 1942 near Ford, Sussex
Pike, Thomas Geoffrey	6	219		Flew a Beaufighter
Pinches, Maurice Henry	8			
Pinckney, David John Colin	7	603	DFC	KIA 23 January 1942 (Singapore)
Pleasance, Harold Percival ("Flash")	5	25		Flew a Beaufighter
Plinston, George Hugo Formby	8			
Plumer, B. E.	5			
Polley, William F.	6			
Ponsford, Ian Reginald	8			
Porter, D. A.	7			
Pottinger, R. W.	8			
Powell, Robin Peter Reginald	11			
Powell-Shedden, George Ffolliott	7		DSO, DFC	
Price-Owen, Waldo B.	8			
Pring, Arthur Maurice Owers	9	89, 176		6 Victories in a Beaufighter with N/RO Phillips, C. T.
Proctor, John Ernest	11		DFC	
Provan, William Wright	5		DFC	
Rabagliati, Alexander Coultate ("Sandy")	21	46, 126, Ta Kali Wing	DFC*	KIA 6 July 1943
Rabone, Paul Wattling	9			
Ramsey, Charles Maurice	8	153		2 Victories in a Beaufighter with N/RO Morton
Ranger, Geoffrey Harold	6			
Rankin, James E. ("Jamie")	22		DSO*, DFC*	
Rayment, Kenneth Gordon	7	153	DFC	5 Victories in a Beaufighter with N/RO's Lanning; Ayliffe, H. D. and Bone; Died in the Munich air disaster on 15 March 1958.
Rayner, Roderick Malachi Seaborne	10			
Read, James Alfred Avory ("Jasper")	10	89, 46, 108		Flew a Beaufighter.
Redhead, E.	5			
Reeves, Nevil Everard	14	89	DSO, DFC	Won 9 of his victories in a Beaufighter with N/RO O'Leary, Arthur Alexander
Reynolds, Richard Henry	6			
Reynolds, Robert Edward	5	255		Flew a Beaufighter with N/RO Wingham, M.
Rhodes-Moorhouse, William Henry	9		DFC	KIA 6 September 1940
Richey, Paul Henry Mills	10		DFC*, CdeG (France), CdeG (Belgium)	
Rigler, Thomas Charles	8			
Riley, William	6	263, 302, 145, 252,272	DFC	Flew a Beaufighter with N/RO F/Sgt. J Martin; Both Riley and Martin KIFA 16 July 1942.
Rippon, Anthony John	7			
Ritchie, Blyth	7			
Robb, Robert L. T. ("Jackson")	14			
Robertson, Frederick Neal	12			
Robertson, John	12			
Robertson, Ronald James H. ("Robbie")	6			
Robinson, Michael Lister ("Mike")	16		DSO, DFC	MIA 8 June 1942
Rolls, William Thomas Edward	17		DFC, DFM	
Rook, Michael ("Mickey")	6			
Rose, Maurice James Alexander	14			
Ross, Jack Kenneth	7		DFC	KIA 6 January 1942
Ruchwaldy, Desmond Fred	7	603, 129	DFM, DFC	+ 10 V-1 flying bombs
Rudland, Clifford Percival	7		DFC*	
Russell, Noel	5	272		1 Victory in a Beaufighter
Ryder, Edgar Norman	8		DFC	POW 1944
Sabey, Albert	5			
Sage, Paul Christopher Wendover	5	89, 46	DFC	Flew a Beaufighter with N/RO Cockburn, John; KIA 22 February 1945
St John, Peter Cape Beauchamp	5			KIA 22 October 1940
Samouelle, Charles James ("Sammy")	11	41 92 130	DFC*	Retired as a wing commander
Sampson, Ralph W. Fraser ("Sammy")	5		DFC	Retired as a Wing commander
Sanders, James Gilbert	16		DFC	
Sanders, Philip James	7		DFC	
Satchell, William Arthur J. ("Jack")	7		DSO	
Saunders, Cecil Henry	7			
Savage, Thomas Wood	5			KIA 10 July 1943 (Malta)
Schade, Patrick Alfred ("Paddy")	18	91	DFM	KIA 31 July 1944
Scott, Allan Hugh	5			
Scott, Ernest ("Ernie")	5			KIA 27 September 1940
Scott-Malden, David Francis Stephen	6			
Scoular, John Evelyn	18		DFC	
Selby, John Beauchamp	5			
Sewell, Alfred Jack ("Jackie")	13	804, 806, 1837		
Sewell, Herbert Scott ("Susie")	5	54, 124	DFC, AFC	
Shaw, Harry ("Artie")	16			
Shaw, John Thornhill	7	3, 32	DSO, DFC, AFC	
Shead, Harold Frederick William	5	89		Flew a Beaufighter with N/RO Curtis
Shepherd, John Bean	13	234, 118, 610, 41	DFC**	+ 7 V-1 flying bombs. KIFA 22 January 1946
Simpson, John William Charles	13			
Simpson, Peter James	7			
Sims, James Ayscough	5			
Sinclair, Gordon Leonard	8			
Sing, John Eric James ("Jackie")	8			
Singleton, Joseph S.	8	25		1 Victory in a Beaufighter with N/RO Bradshaw, Chris
Sizer, Wilfred Max ("Wilf")	12		DFC*	Retired as Wing Commander in 1963
Skinner, Wilfred Malcom	11			
Slade-Betts, Kenneth Gordon	20		DFC	
Smart, Thomas	8		DFC*	KIA 12 April 1943
Smith, Alan	8	616, 93	DFC*	
Smith, Edward Brian Bretherton	5		DFC	
Smith, Leonard Alfred	7			
Smith, Leslie Ernest	5			
Smith, William Alexander	6			
Smythe, Rupert Frederick	6	504,32	DFC	Left the service in 1946 as a flight lieutenant
Snowdon, Ernest George	5			
Soden, Ian Scovill	6			
Soper, Francis Joseph	14		DFC, DFM	
Sowrey, John Adam	7		DFC, AFC	
Sparke, Philip Donald Julian	6			
Spencer, Terence ("Terry")	10			
Staples, Michael Edmund	5			KIA 9 November 1941
Stapleton, Frederick Snowden	7	54, 611, 03, 87, 42	CB, DSO, DFC	Retired 1966 Air Vice-Marshal
Stark, Lawrence W. F. ("Pinkie")	6			
Starr, Norman John ("Jack")	5	605	DFC*	KIA 8 Jan 1945 Dunkirk
Stavert, Charles Michael	6			
Steere, Harry	11		DFM, DFC	KIA 8 June 1944
Steere, Jack	6			
Stephen, Harbourne Mackay	9		DSO, DFC**	Also credited with eight confirmed shared kills, plus at least four unconfirmed. Achieved 600th victory for squadrons flying from Biggin Hill with J.C. Mungo-Park – their pairing was known as the "Deadly Twins." Died 22 August 2001
Stephens, Maurice Michael ("Mike")	23		DSO, DFC**	
Stephenson, Leslie	10	153	DFC*	6 Victories in a Beaufighter with N/RO Hall, G. A.
Stevens, Richard Playne	15	151	DSO, DFC*	
Stevenson, Peter Charles Fasken	8			
Stevenson, Ian Turnbull	5			
Steward, George Arthur	6			
Stewart, Charles L. W.	5			
Stok, Bram van der ("Bob")	6	41 (Note: Van der Stok scored his first two victories in the Fokker D.XXI during the German invasion in the Netherlands, when he flew a Fokker D.XXI fighter as a member of the 1 JaVA (1st Fighter Sqn) of the Dutch LVA (Army Aviation Bde).) (Note: One of Van der Stok's Dutch Fokker D.XXI victory claims and two of his Supermarine Spitfire victory claims are disputed)	CdeG MBE, Dutch Bronze Lion, Dutch Airman's Cross (Note: Van der Stok is the only soldier who won all four Dutch bravery awards that were set during WW2 for bravery and valour: the Bronze Lion (awarded 15 June 1946), the Bronze Cross (Netherlands) (5 October 1944), the Dutch Airman's Cross (21 September 1942) and the Cross of Merit (Netherlands) (3 September 1942). He also won the Officer's Cross w. palm of the Order of Leopold (Belgium) (24 March 1947), the Belgian CdeG w palm, 3 British campaign medals (1939–1945 Star; Air Crew Europe Star; France and Germany Star), the Cross of Valour (Poland) (9 May 1945), the Dutch Resistance Memorial Cross. He was made an Officer in the Orde van Oranje-Nassau and an (Honorary) Member of the Order of the British Empire (19 November 1947).)	Dutch
Stokoe, Jack	8	603, 54	DFC	
Stone, Cedric Arthur C. ("Bunny")	7			
Stones, Donald William A. ("Dimsie")	12		DFC	
Storrar, James Eric ("Jas")	14		DFC	
Stott, John Philip	5	1770		FAA. First and only WW2 pilot to become an Ace in a Fairey Firefly
Strickland, James Murray	9		DFC	KIA 14 August 1941
Stuckey, Vincent Allan J. ("Heimar")	6			
Styles, Lawrence Hinton	5	219, 153, 600	DFC*	Flew a Beaufighter with N/RO's Smith, L.; Ritchie, J. and Wilmer, H. J.
Surman, John Clarke	5	604		1 Victory in a Beaufighter with N/RO Weston, Clarence E.
Sutherland, C.	7			
Sutton, Fraser Barry	5			
Talalla, Cyril Lionel F. ("Jimmy")	5	118, 122	DFC*	Malayan
Taylor, Edwin Murray	6			
Taylor, Frederic Frank ("Eric")	7			
Taylor, John Stuart	15			
Taylor, Norman	7			KIFA 28 April 1948
Taylour, Edward Winchester Tollemache	7		DSC	FAA. KIA 13 September 1942
Tennant, Eric	6			
Theobald, Albert William	5			
Thomas, Eric Hugh	5		DFC	
Thomas, Hugh Brian	5			
Thomas, Rhys H.	5			
Thompson, Dennis Alfred	5	600		Flew a Beaufighter with N/RO's White and Beaumont, Gerald
Thompson, John Marlow	10		DFC, DSO, AFC	
Thompson, Peter Douglas	6		DFC	
Thompson, William L.	5			
Thorn(e), Edward Rowland	13	264	DFC*, DFM*	Flew a Boulton Paul Defiant so all victories also credited to his air gunner, Sgt. F.J. Barker.. Thorn and Barker were the top-scoring Defiant crew. KIFA 2 February 1946.
Thornton, Cyril Brooking	9			
Thornton-Brown, Patrick Glynn	5			
Thwaites, Bernard John	6		DFC*	
Tillard, Rupert Claude	6		DSC	FAA,KIA 8 May 1941
Tinsey, Thomas Davy ("Tommy")	9		DFC	Died October 1944: RTC in England.
Topham, E.	10	91		
Topham, John K. Groves	13	219, 125	DSO, DFC*	9 Victories in a Beaufighter with N/RO Berridge, H. W.
Townsend, Kenneth Norman Varwell	5			
Townsend, Peter Wooldridge	11		DFC*, DSO	
Toyne, William Arthur	6			
Tuck, Robert Roland Stanford	29		DFC**, DSO, AFC	Prisoner of war from 28 January 1942
Tuckwell, George Arthur	5	272	DFM	Flew a Beaufighter with N/RO Hubbard, K. F.
Tull, Desmond Trevor	8	FIU		1 Victory in a Beaufighter
Turkington, Robert W.	9	124, 611, 43, 72, 241, 601		Irish. KIFA Apr 1945
Turner, Percival Stanley	14	242, 145, 411, 249	DSO, DFC*	Canadian. . He remained in the RCAF until 1965 and died in Ottawa on 23 July 1985.
Turner, Robert Charles	6	264		Turret gunner on two-man Boulton Paul Defiant fighter piloted by P/O D. Whitley. KIA 28 August 1940
Unwin, George Cecil ("Grumpy")	15	19, 613	DSO, DFM*	Retired in 1961 as Wing Commander
Upton, Hamilton Charles	11		DFC	
Usher, Dennis Charles	5		DFC, DFM	Retired as Squadron Leader
Vale, William ("Cherry")	33	33, 80	DFC*, AFC	
Varey, Arthur William	6			
Vassiliades, Basilios Michael ("Basil")	10			Greek, but flew with the RAF. KIA 25 March 1945
Vigors, Timothy Ashmead	6		DFC	
Villa, John Wolferstan ("Pancho")	17		DFC	
Voase-Jeff, Robert	5		DFC*, CdeG	KIA 11 August 1940
Wade, Trevor Sidney ("Wimpy")	10	92	DFC, AFC	Test pilot post war. KIFA 3 April 1951
Wake, Frederick William	5	264, No. 96 Squadron RAF	DFM	Turret gunner on two-man Boulton Paul Defiant 96 Night Fighter Sqn piloted by New Zealander F/O Victor Verity
Wakeham, Ernest John Cecil	7		DFC	
Wallens, Ronald Walter	5		DFC	
Walmsley, Harold Edward	11½	130, 350	DFC*	Promoted to Group Captain postwar.
Watkins, Desmond John ("Des")	7⅓		DFC, CdeG + palm	1921–2003
Watson, Anthony	6	203, 272	DFC	Flew a Beaufighter
Weaver, Percy Stevenson	9	56		KIA 31 August 1940
Webb, Paul Clifford	6			
Webster, John Terence	13		DFC	
Wedgwood, Jefferson	13		DFC*	
Welsh, Terence Deane	7	264, 125	DFC	Flew a Boulton Paul Defiant and scored all his victories in it, so all victories also credited to his air gunner L.D. Hayden; In 1945 released from the RAF as a flight lieutenant. Died in 1980.
Whall, Basil Ewart Patrick	9	602	DFM	KIA 7 October 1940
White, Derek	6	BCRF, (Note: BCRF = Beaufighter Coastal Reconnaissance Flight) 39	DFC	Flew a Beaufighter with N/RO Sgt A. Coldman Retired as a S/Ldr in 1968.
White, Harold	12	141	DFC**	
White, John	5	72	DFM	KIA June 1940
Whitley, David ("Bull")	6	264		Flew a Boulton Paul Defiant so all victories also credited to his air gunner Sgt. R.C. Turner. KIA 28 August 1940
Wickham, Peter Reginald Whalley	17			Born in Nairobi, Kenya
Wight, Ronald Derek Gordon	5	213	DFC	KIA 11 August 1940
Williams, Cedric Watcyn	5			
Williams, J.E.M.	5	264		Turret gunner on two-man Boulton Paul Defiant fighter piloted by P/O E.G. Barwell
Williams, William Dudley	6			
Willson, John Ellis	10	219, 153		Flew a Beaufighter with N/RO Burch, D. C. KIA 27 August 1943 Malta
Woodman, Ronald George ("Tim")	7	169, 85, BSDU, 410, No. 96 Squadron RAF	DSO, DFC	Mosquito ace.
Woods-Scawen, Charles Anthony	7	43	DFC	KIA 2 September 1940. Brother of Patrick Woods-Scawen
Woods-Scawen, Patrick Philip	14	85	DFC	KIA 1 September 1940. Brother of Charles Woods-Scawen
Wright, Allan Richard	14	92, 29	DFC, AFC	1 Victory in a Beaufighter
Wright, Eric William ("Ricky")	6			
Yates, Jack Neville ("Banger")	5	607, 60, 802	DFC	
Yaxley, Robert Gordon	5	252, 272, 117	DSO, MC, DFC	KIA 3 June 1943 returning to El Djem Airfield from UK
Young, Michael Hugh	13	264	DFC	Flew a Boulton Paul Defiant and won the first 11 of his victories with air gunner LAC S.B. Johnson (KIA 31 May 1940), and the final 2 with Sgt. L.P. Russell

Abbreviations

- "KIA": Killed in action (dates are included where possible).
- "KIFA": Killed in Flying Accident.
- "MIA": Missing in action.
- "WIA": Wounded in action leading to death which, in some cases, may have occurred months later.
- "POW": taken Prisoner of war.
- "RTC": Road traffic collision.
- "FAA": denotes that the person served with the Royal Navy's Fleet Air Arm, rather than with the Royal Air Force.
- N/RO: Navigator/Radio operator

== Awards ==
Awards
Award	Title	Notes
AE	Air Efficiency Award	Awarded for ten years' efficient service in the Royal Auxiliary Air Force
AFC	Air Force Cross	At this time, awarded "for acts of courage or devotion to duty whilst flying, though not in active operations against the enemy" to commissioned officers and warrant officers. Extended to all ranks in 1993.
CdeG	Croix de Guerre	A military decoration of both France and Belgium, also commonly bestowed to foreign military forces allied to France and Belgium.
DFC	Distinguished Flying Cross	At this time, awarded "for acts of gallantry when flying in active operations against the enemy" to commissioned officers and warrant officers. Extended to all ranks in 1993.
DFC*	Distinguished Flying Cross and Bar	A bar is added to the ribbon for holders of the DFC who receive a second award.
DFC**	Distinguished Flying Cross and two Bars	A second bar is added to the ribbon for holders of the DFC and Bar who receive a third award.
DFM	Distinguished Flying Medal	At this time, awarded "for acts of gallantry when flying in active operations against the enemy" to non-commissioned officers and men. Discontinued in 1993.
DSO	Distinguished Service Order	Awarded for meritorious or distinguished service by officers of the armed forces during wartime, typically in actual combat.
DSO*	Distinguished Service Order and Bar	A bar is added to the ribbon for holders of the DSO who receive a second award.
DSO**	Distinguished Service Order and two Bars	A second bar is added to the ribbon for holders of the DSO and Bar who receive a third award.
MC	Military Cross	At this time, awarded for "distinguished and meritorious services" to officers of the rank of Captain or below, and warrant officers. Extended to all ranks in 1993.
MiD	Mentioned in despatches	Awarded for gallantry or otherwise commendable service.
VC	Victoria Cross	Highest British military decoration, awarded for valour in the face of the enemy.
VM	Virtuti Militari	Highest Polish military award for courage in the face of the enemy

== See also ==
- List of RAF aircrew in the Battle of Britain
- List of Royal Air Force aircraft squadrons
