= Ted Thorn (RAF officer) =

Edward Rowland Thorn
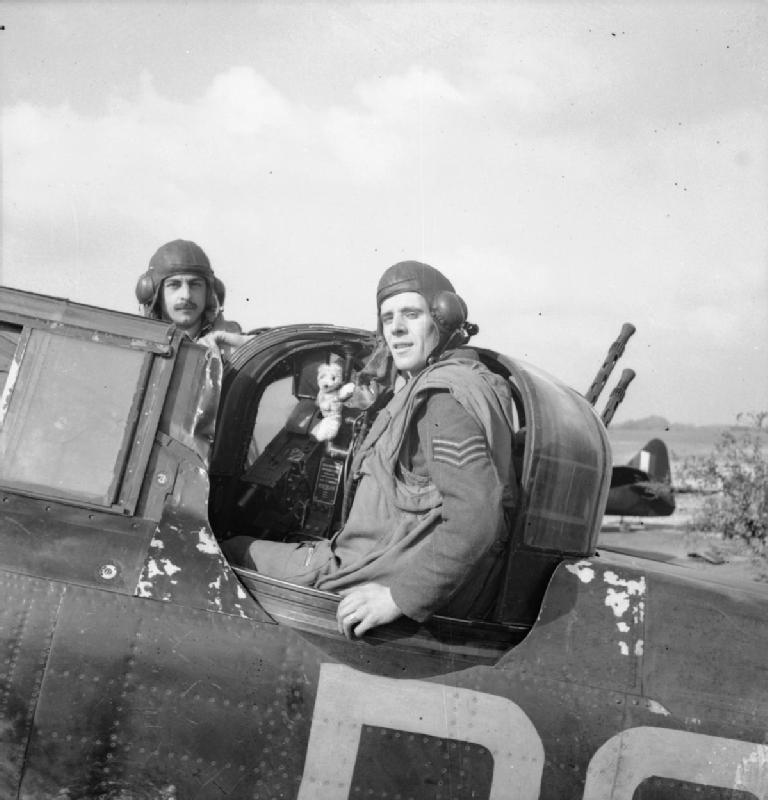
- Flight Sergeants E R Thorn (left) and F J Barker (right) pose with their Defiant after destroying their 13th Axis aircraft; Thorn and Barker were the most successful Defiant crew of the war
- Born: 15 April 1913; North End, Hampshire
- Died: 12 February 1946 (aged 32); Landbeach, Cambridgeshire
- Burial place: Bishop’s Waltham (St. Peter) Churchyard. Hampshire
- Relatives: Marion Thorn (nee McAlpine)
- Military career
- Allegiance: United Kingdom
- Branch: Royal Air Force
- Service years: 1928–1946
- Rank: Squadron Leader
- Service number: 562610, later 46957
- Units: No. 264 Squadron RAF; No. 32 Squadron RAF; No. 169 Squadron RAF
- Conflicts: Second World War: Battle of France; Battle of Britain; Dieppe Raid
- Awards: Distinguished Flying Cross & Bar; Distinguished Flying Medal & Bar; Mentioned in Despatches (2)

Edward Rowland Thorn, DFC & Bar, DFM & Bar (15 April 1913 – 12 February 1946), also known as Roland Thorn, was a Royal Air Force pilot, squadron commander and a notable flying ace of the Second World War. He and his turret gunner shot down 12 enemy aircraft over the Dunkirk evacuation beaches and during the Battle of Britain. Thorn survived the war but was killed in a crash of an early jet fighter in 1946.

== Early life ==
Edward Rowland (or Roland (Note: Both spellings of his middle name are used in official sources such as the London Gazette.)) Thorn was born at North End, Hampshire on 15 April 1913, the son of Thomas Thorn, a chef from Newport, and his wife Ellen Maria. In 1916, when Rowland was three, his father was killed in the First World War. The two children were educated at local council schools in North End. At home he was known as Roland, although in later life in the RAF he was known as Ted. In August 1939 he married Marion McAlpine, in Droxford, Hampshire. The couple set up home in Bishop’s Waltham, Hampshire.

== Royal Air Force ==
Thorn joined the Royal Air Force (RAF) as an aircraft apprentice with the service number 562610 in 1928 and passed out from the No. 1 School of Technical Training RAF based at RAF Halton. He trained to be a non-commissioned officer pilot and by the early 1930s had earned his pilot’s aircrew brevet. War broke out in September 1939 and one month later Thorne was posted to the newly formed No. 264 Squadron RAF at RAF Sutton Bridge to fly the Boulton Paul Defiant An unusual fighter for its era, the Defiant had a single engine but was armed with four .303 machine guns in a rear turret operated by an air gunner. As the squadron began to take shape, its new commanding officer, Squadron Leader Philip Hunter, arrived. Thorn had teamed up with leading aircraftman Frederick James Barker from Bow in London. They formed part of the flight commanded by Nicholas Gresham Cooke. In early operations the Defiant was often mistaken for the similarly shaped Hawker Hurricane by German pilots who dived to attack from above and behind, the blind spot for a Hurricane pilot, but directly into the fire from the gunner’s turret on a Defiant.

=== Battles of France and Dunkirk ===
On 27 May 1940 Thorn and Barker are reported to have shot down a Messerschmitt Bf 109 near Dunkirk, but this is not mentioned in other records. On 28 May 1940, just north of Dunkirk, their flight was attacked by a formation of Bf 109 fighters; handling his aircraft skillfully Thorn enabled Barker to shoot down three of them very quickly. On 29 May 1940, again over Dunkirk, the crew were involved in 264 Squadron's major success when they went into combat at about 1515 hours, shooting down a Junkers Ju 87 dive bomber and a Messerschmitt Bf 110 twin-engined fighter at about 1515 hours. On a second mission at 1930 hours they shot down another Ju 87 and another Bf 110; Shores also records a share in the destruction of a Heinkel He 111 bomber on that date.

On 31 May 1940, also over Dunkirk, they shot down two Heinkel He 111 bombers and damaged two more as the Luftwaffe attempted to prevent the beachhead evacuation operations. Their flight commander, Nicholas Cooke, failed to return from that mission. After the completion of the Dunkirk evacuation, the Luftwaffe had gained operational experience in fighting against the Defiant fighter and it had become an extremely vulnerable aircraft to operate in daylight against formations escorted by Bf 109 fighters. The months after Dunkirk were spent rebuilding the squadron, which had suffered heavy losses, and preparing for the Battle of Britain, which was to come. They moved to RAF Hornchurch to participate in the Battle of Britain, although seriously out-classed by the enemy.

On 14 June 1940 both Thorn and Barker were awarded the Distinguished Flying Medal for their bravery in action and success as a fighter crew. Barker was also promoted to sergeant.

=== Battle of Britain ===
In five days of operations in the Battle of Britain against the attacking Luftwaffe from 24 to 28 August 1940, No. 264 Squadron was almost wiped out, losing three aircraft and crews on 24 August, three more on 26 August and three more on 28 August. On 24 August, in action against a formation of Junkers Ju 88 bombers which had just bombed RAF Manston, Thorn and Barker shot down one of the enemy, but Philip Hunter, the squadron commander, and his gunner were last seen chasing an enemy bomber out to sea and posted missing when they failed to return. On 26 August 1940 at mid-day, Thorn and Barker were in action against the Luftwaffe bomber streams again and shot down two Dornier Do 17 bombers over Dover. As they commenced an attack on a third Do 17, a Bf 109 attacked them, badly damaging their Defiant (serial number L7005). Thorn dived quickly away to crash land the crippled aircraft, which had caught fire, but the Bf 109 came in for a second attack; Barker assisted a Hurricane in shooting it down, before he and Thorn baled out. The aircraft crashed quite close to each other at Marshside, Kent near Chislet. Thorn and Barker were both slightly wounded.

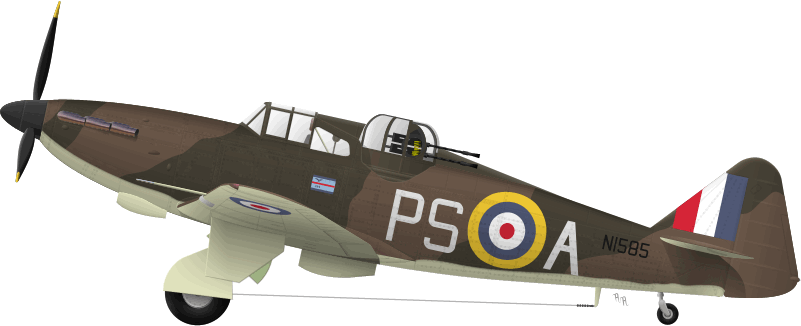
Defiant Mk.I N1585, PS-A of No. 264 Sqn based at RAF Kirton in Lindsey in July 1940

Thorn and Barker were the most successful Boulton Paul Defiant crew of the war.

=== Later career ===
The RAF recognised the vulnerability of the Boulton Paul Defiant on daylight operations and assigned its squadrons to night fighting. In recognition of their success and great bravery during the Battle of Britain Thorn and Barker were both awarded a Bar to their Distinguished Flying Medals on 11 February 1941. Flying as night fighters, Thorn and Barker destroyed a Heinkel He 111 on the night of 9 – 10 April 1941 as it took part in the Blitz on England’s cities. The bomber crashed near Bushbridge, Surrey and was identified as an aircraft of 5 Staffel/KG 55. By now an acting warrant officer, Thorn was commissioned pilot officer with service number 46957 on 11 October 1941 and assigned to No. 32 Squadron RAF flying Hurricane fighters and breaking up the successful partnership of Ted Thorn and Fred Barker. Barker remained with the squadron for two more years before becoming an instructor in the Middle East. Thorn was promoted flying officer on 26 February 1942, and then flight lieutenant on 6 July 1942, and appointed acting squadron leader commanding No. 32 Squadron RAF from April until September 1942.

The squadron saw heavy action over the Dieppe Raid commando landings on 19 August 1942, and Thorn was decorated with the Distinguished Flying Cross on 22 September 1942 for his achievements in command and particularly for his bravery over Dieppe. He completed a tour of duty as an instructor with No. 61 Operational Training Unit from November 1942 at the end of which he received a Mention in Despatches on 14 January 1944 for his dedication to the training of the young pilots under his command. Posted to No. 169 Squadron RAF as a flight commander he led night fighting and night intruder missions against the Luftwaffe night fighters over occupied Europe. For his achievements in this role Thorn was awarded a Bar to his Distinguished Flying Cross on 8 December 1944. At the end of the war in Europe he was transferred to command a training unit. In this position on 1 January 1946 he was again Mentioned in Despatches for his skill and dedication as a flying instructor and commander.

== Death ==
On 12 February 1946 Thorn was a squadron leader and member of staff at the Empire Central Flying School, where early jet fighters were being flown, when he died in an accident. It is sometimes reported that he was aboard Mosquito TA525, although most reports state that the Dutch pilot of that aircraft was on a solo mission. Thorn was actually flying Gloster Meteor F.3 serial number EE456 of the Empire Central Flying School when his aircraft dived out of a cloud and crashed at Rectory Farm near Landbeach, Cambridgeshire. He is buried at St Peter's Churchyard, Bishop's Waltham in Hampshire.

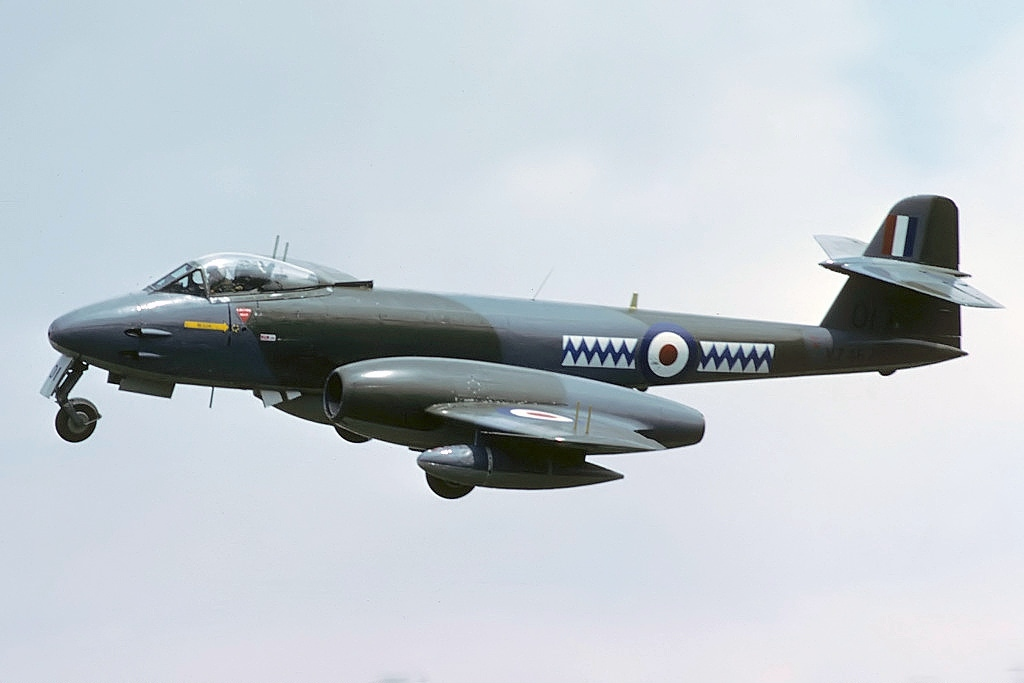
Meteor F.8 in flight at RAF Greenham Common, May 1986

== Honours and awards ==
- 14 June 1940 – 562610 Sergeant Edward Rowland Thorn and 747751 Leading Aircraftman Frederick James Barker, are both awarded the Distinguished Flying Medal

Sergeant Thorn and Leading Aircraftman Barker, as pilot and air gunner respectively, have shown considerable determination and skill when engaging the enemy in a Defiant aircraft. On one occasion, when three similar aircraft in their squadron had been shot down, these airmen engaged three Messerschmitt 109’s which were operating on the rear of the squadron, and succeeded in shooting them down. The remaining enemy aircraft were forced to break off the engagement. Sergeant Thorn and Leading Aircraftman Barker have so far destroyed six enemy aircraft.

- 11 February 1941 – 562610 Flight Sergeant Edward Rowland Thorn, No. 264 Squadron RAF and 747751 Sergeant Frederick James Barker, Royal Air Force Volunteer Reserve, No. 264 Squadron RAF were both awarded a Bar to the Distinguished Flying Medal
- 22 September 1942 – Acting Squadron Leader Edward Rowland Thorn DFM, (46957), No. 32 Squadron RAF awarded the Distinguished Flying Cross on for his achievements in command and particularly for his bravery over Dieppe on 19 August 1942.

Squadron Leader Thorn, by his personal example and untiring energy, has built his squadron into a highly efficient unit during the five months in which he has been its commanding officer. During the combined operations at Dieppe on 19th August, 1942, he displayed great courage and determination when under heavy fire from the ground defences and he refused to be diverted from his task when warned that he was being attacked by an enemy fighter. The successes achieved by the squadron on this and other occasions have been primarily due to Squadron Leader Thorn's gallantry and fine leadership both in the air and on the ground.

- 14 January 1944 – Acting Squadron Leader E. R. Thorn DFC DFM (46957) is Mentioned in Despatches.
- 8 December 1944 Acting Squadron Leader E. R. Thorn DFC DFM (46957) awarded a Bar to the Distinguished Flying Cross.
- 1 January 1946 – Squadron Leader E. R. Thorn DFC DFM (46957) is Mentioned in Despatches.

== See also ==
- List of World War II flying aces

== Bibliography ==
- Foreman, John (2003). RAF Fighter Command Victory Claims, Part One. Walton-on-Thames: Red Kite. ISBN 0-9538061-8-9.
- Foreman, John (2005). RAF Fighter Command Victory Claims, Part Two. Walton-on-Thames: Red Kite. ISBN 0-9546201-5-1.
- Franks, Norman (1983). The Air Battle of Dunkirk. London: William Kimber. ISBN 0-7183-0349-0.
- Franks, Norman (1997). Royal Air Force Fighter Command Losses, Volume 1. Earl Shilton: Midland Counties. ISBN 1-857800559.
- Mason, Francis (1969). Battle Over Britain. London: McWhirter Brothers. ISBN 0-901928-00-3.
- Ramsey, Winston (1989). Battle of Britain: Then and Now -V. London: After The Battle. ISBN 0-900913-46-0. Now
- Ramsey, Winston (1989). The Blitz: Then and –Volume 2. London: After The Battle. ISBN 0-900913-54-1.
- Shores, Christopher (1994). Aces High. London: Grub Street. ISBN 1-898697-00-0.*Shores, Christopher (1999). Aces High, Volume 2. London: Grub Street. ISBN 1-898697-00-0.
- Thomas, Andrew (2012). Defiant, Blenheim and Havoc Aces. London: Osprey Publishing. ISBN 978-1849086660.
