= Philip Hunter =

Philip Hunter may refer to:

- Philip Hunter (educationist) (born 1940), British educationist
- Philip Vassar Hunter (1883–1956), British electrical engineer
- Phil Hunter, a fictional character in The Bill
- Philip Hunter (RAF officer), RAF pilot during the Battle of Britain
