= Eric Barwell =

British flying ace of WWII

- Barwell, in 1940
- Born: 6 August 1913; Clare, Suffolk, England
- Died: 12 December 2007 (aged 94)
- Military career
- Allegiance: United Kingdom
- Branch: Royal Air Force
- Service years: 1939–1945
- Rank: Wing Commander
- Commands: No. 125 Squadron; No. 264 Squadron
- Conflicts: Second World War: Battle of France; Battle of Britain; The Blitz; Operation Overlord
- Awards: Distinguished Flying Cross & Bar; Mention in Despatches

Eric Barwell, DFC & Bar (6 August 1913 – 12 December 2007) was a British flying ace who served in the Royal Air Force (RAF) during the Second World War. He was credited with having shot down at least nine aircraft, plus one V-1 flying bomb.

Born in Clare, Suffolk, Barwell, a serving member of the Royal Air Force Volunteer Reserve, was called up for service in the RAF on the outbreak of the Second World War. Posted to No. 264 Squadron, he flew Boulton Paul Defiant fighters during the later stages of the Battle of France when the British Expeditionary Force was evacuated from Dunkirk. Achieving a number of aerial victories, he flew in the following Battle of Britain. By the end of 1940, the squadron was on night fighter operations. Awarded the Distinguished Flying Cross (DFC) in February 1941, he was posted to a few months later to No. 125 Squadron, which he subsequently commanded. Later in the war he achieved further aerial victories flying the De Havilland Mosquito heavy fighter and was awarded a Bar to his DFC. He briefly commanded No. 264 Squadron after the end of the war in Europe before leaving the RAF. In civilian life, he worked in his family's engineering business. He died in 2007, aged 94.

== Early life ==
Eric Gordon Barwell was born on 6 August 1913 at Clare, in the English county of Suffolk. He went to Wellingborough School after which he joined the family business, an engineering factory near Cambridge. With his older brother already serving in the Royal Air Force (RAF), he joined the Royal Air Force Volunteer Reserve (RAFVR) in July 1938, receiving his flight instruction at No. 22 Elementary and Reserve Flying Training School at Marshalls Airfield. Having flown Tiger Moth trainers, he duly qualified for his wings.

== Second World War ==
On the outbreak of the Second World War in September 1939, Barwell was called up for service with the RAF. He went to No. 2 Flying Training School at Brize Norton for the final stages of his training and was commissioned as a pilot officer on probation. He was then posted to No. 266 Squadron, which was equipped with Supermarine Spitfire fighters and based at Sutton Bridge. However his older brother Philip was a wing commander at Sutton Bridge and it was decided to send Eric elsewhere. He was duly posted to No. 264 Squadron. This was a newly formed unit that was stationed at RAF Martlesham Heath and working up with the new Boulton Paul Defiant turret fighter.

Lacking experience on the type, Barwell was sent to No. 12 Group Fighter Pool at Aston Down for familiarisation with the aircraft. It was not until February 1940 that he returned to No. 264 Squadron. By this time the squadron had largely overcome the initial issues it had experienced with the Defiant and the following month it became operational, doing patrol work.

=== Battle of France ===
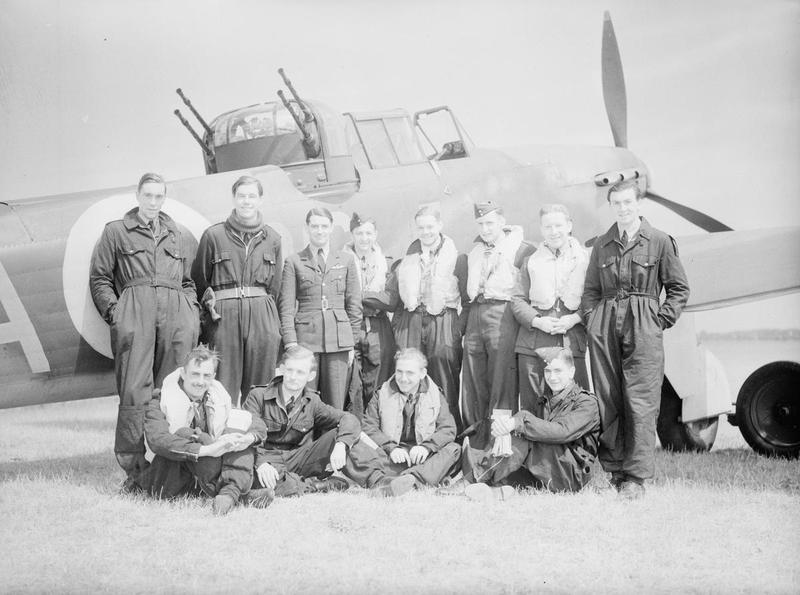
Aircrew of No. 264 Squadron in front of a Boulton Paul Defiant fighter; Barwell stands third right while the commanding officer, Philip Hunter, stands third left

From mid-May, No. 264 Squadron began flying sorties from Manston to France, patrolling between Dunkirk and Boulogne. Initially, it saw considerable success as Luftwaffe fighters would seek to engage the Defiants from the rear, misidentifying the type as a Hawker Hurricane fighter and coming into the range of the turret gunner's armament. In its first major engagement on 27 May, six Luftwaffe fighters were destroyed. Two days later, the squadron made two afternoon sorties to Dunkirk, from where the British Expeditionary Force was being evacuated; in the first, Barwell and his gunner, Pilot Officer J. Williams, destroyed a Messerschmitt Bf 109 fighter. In the second, they shot down two Junkers Ju 87 dive bombers. These were three of 37 Luftwaffe aircraft to be claimed as destroyed by No. 264 Squadron that day.

On 29 May, Barwell and Williams combined to shoot down a Bf 109 off Dunkirk. On a subsequent sortie the same day, they destroyed a Heinkel He 111 medium bomber but the engine of their Defiant was damaged in the engagement. Barwell flew the Defiant, which was losing its engine coolant, close to the English coast, eventually coming down in the English Channel about 5 miles (8.0 km) from Dover. This was the first time a Defiant had attempted to ditch in the sea. Barwell and Williams were rescued by the Royal Navy destroyer HMS Malcolm.

By the end of May, the squadron had claimed around 65 German aircraft as destroyed, although this was almost certainly overstated the Luftwaffe's actual losses. Its own losses over Dunkirk were high, as the German fighter pilots quickly learned to avoid approaching the Defiants from the rear. Due to these losses, early in June No. 264 Squadron moved to Fowlmere and then Kirton-in-Lindsey for night fighting duties and dawn patrols the following month. By this time Barwell had recovered from the slight injuries he had received when ditching his Defiant on 29 May.

=== Battle of Britain ===
No. 264 Squadron was largely unsuccessful during its time in a night fighter role, achieving only one aerial victory in nearly three months. It was recalled to Manston on 23 August in order to help relieve the hard pressed RAF fighter squadrons in the south of England. On 24 August, a force of Junkers Ju 88 medium bombers attacked Manston while Barwell was leading a section on patrol over the airfield. Now flying with Sergeant Martin as his gunner, he pursued the bombers but then detected several Bf 109s looking to intercept his Defiants. Engaging these, he destroyed one over Ramsgate. The rest of the squadron had taken off and destroyed three of the Ju 88s but a total of four Defiants, including Barwell's wingman as well as the commanding officer, Squadron Leader Philip Hunter, were shot down.

Further losses over the next five days saw No. 264 Squadron withdrawn back to Kirton-in-Lindsey at the end of the month. For the remainder of the Battle of Britain, the squadron was consigned to night fighting duties and convoy protection patrols over the North Sea. It saw little success for the remainder of the year.

=== Night fighting duties ===
By early 1941, Barwell's probationary period as a pilot officer had ended and he now held the rank of flying officer. In February, he was awarded the Distinguished Flying Cross, by which time he was married to Ruth née Birchall, an officer in the Women's Auxiliary Air Force. The couple would have at least one child. No. 264 Squadron soon began to make successful interceptions and on the night of 10 April, Barwell, still with paired with Martin, shot down one He 111 over Beachy Head and probably destroyed a second in the same area. The latter may have been damaged from an earlier engagement with another RAF night fighter.

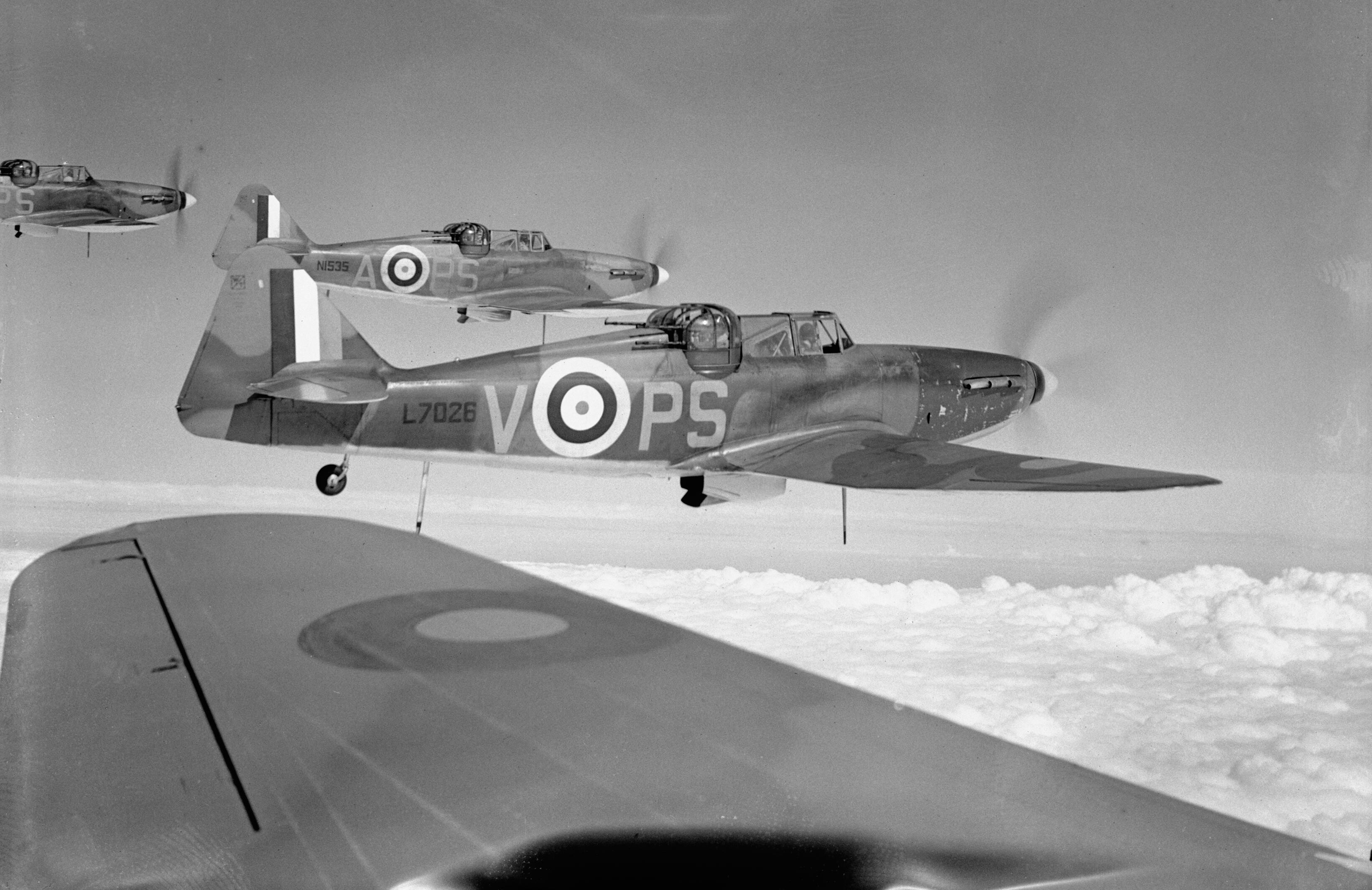
Boulton Paul Defiants of No. 264 Squadron in flight

In July, Barwell was posted away to No. 125 Squadron as a flight lieutenant. This was a newly formed night fighter unit at Colerne and equipped with Defiants before shifting to Fairwood Common where it became operational in late September. Tasked with the aerial defence of South Wales and Bristol, it was largely unsuccessful in this role. By the end of the year Barwell was leading the unit as an acting squadron leader. It began to receive the Bristol Beaufighter heavy fighter in February 1942 but at the same time, the rank to lead the squadron was upgraded to wing commander. As a result of this, Barwell had to relinquish command and stepped down to lead one of its flights.

With the new aircraft, Barwell's squadron began to make successful interceptions and on the night of 2 July, he damaged a Dornier Do 217 medium bomber near Cardiff. The previous day, his brother Philip, at the time commander of the RAF station at Biggin Hill, was shot down and killed; flying in company with Squadron Leader Bobby Oxspring, the pair were attacked by RAF fighters in an incident of friendly fire, Philip going down into the English Channel.} Barwell went to a staff posting in September, being assigned to the headquarters of No. 10 Group. He was mentioned in despatches in the 1943 New Year Honours.

In April 1943 Barwell returned to No. 125 Squadron to resume command of one of its flights. Early the following year, the squadron reequipped with the De Havilland Mosquito heavy fighter. Flying one of these to the south of Melksham on the night of 23 April, and guided by his radar operator, Flight Lieutenant D. Haigh, he destroyed a Ju 88. During Operation Overlord, the squadron patrolled over the Normandy landing beaches and on the night of 24 June, Barwell destroyed another Ju 88 near Îles Saint-Marcouf on the night of 24 June. Soon afterwards, the squadron was engaged in Operation Diver, the RAF's campaign against German V-1 flying bombs launched at southeast England from sites in France. Barwell shot down one of these V-1s into the English Channel on 10 August. A few days afterwards, he was awarded a Bar to his DFC; the citation, published in The London Gazette, read:

This officer has completed a very large number of sorties and his example of keenness, determination and devotion to duty has been worthy of the highest praise. He is a most able flight commander whose untiring efforts have been reflected in the operational efficiency of the formation he commands. Squadron Leader Barwell has destroyed 6 enemy aircraft, 2 of them at night.

— London Gazette, No. 36656, 15 August 1944

In August, Barwell was briefly posted to the Fighter Interception Unit, where he flew Hawker Tempest and North American Mustang fighters, before being sent the following month to the headquarters of the Second Tactical Air Force (2TAF) as an acting wing commander. He received a substantive promotion to squadron leader in December. Barwell spent the final weeks of the war as the wing leader at No. 145 Wing.

Barwell ended the war credited with having shot down nine aircraft and one V-1 flying bomb. He is also credited with one aircraft probably destroyed and one damaged.

== Later life ==
Barwell was briefly appointed commander of his former unit, No. 264 Squadron, in June 1945. Equipped with Mosquitoes, this was stationed at Twente in The Netherlands as part of the 2TAF but it was disbanded in August. Soon afterwards Barwell left the service of the RAF and resumed working for the family business. Although no longer on active service, he remained in the RAFVR until 1958.

Barwell's company commercialised proprietary technology relating to rubber engineering and eventually was brought out by an American concern. At the time, Barwell was director of accounts. In his later years, he and his wife Ruth resided in Cambridge. As Ruth was an artist, the couple often travelled to mainland Europe so she could paint. He died on 12 December 2007, aged 94.
