= Michael Young (RAF officer) =

British flying ace of WWII

- Young, in 1940
- Born: 12 June 1920; Gloucester, United Kingdom
- Died: January 1998 (aged 77)
- Military career
- Allegiance: United Kingdom
- Branch: Royal Air Force
- Rank: Squadron Leader
- Units: No. 264 Squadron; No. 73 Squadron
- Commands: No. 213 Squadron
- Conflicts: Second World War: Battle of France; Battle of Britain; North African campaign; Italian campaign
- Awards: Distinguished Flying Cross; Mention in Despatches

Michael Young DFC (12 June 1920–January 1998) was a British flying ace of the Royal Air Force (RAF) during the Second World War. He is credited with the destruction of thirteen aircraft.

From Gloucester, Young joined the RAF in the per-war period and was still undergoing his flying training at the time of the outbreak of the Second World War. Posted to No. 264 Squadron, he flew Boulton Paul Defiant turret fighters during the later stages of the Battle of France and then in the following Battle of Britain. With his gunner, Leading Aircraftsman Stanley Johnson, he claimed several aerial victories. After the death of Johnson during an engagement off the French coast, Young was paired with Sergeant Leslie Russell as his gunner and the duo achieved further aerial victories. Young later served in North Africa, commanding No. 213 Squadron in operations in Egypt, and flying with fighter squadrons during the Italian campaign. He spent the final months of the war on the teaching staff at Cranwell. Leaving the RAF in early 1946, he later worked in the brewing industry. Retiring to Gloucestershire, he died in January 1998 at the age of 77.

== Early life ==
Born on 12 June 1920 at Gloucester in the United Kingdom, Michael Hugh Young was educated at the Crypt School. After completing his schooling, he joined the Royal Air Force (RAF) in February 1939 on a short service commission. He trained at No. 3 Elementary & Reserve Flying Training School at Hamble, then proceeded to No. 12 Flying Training School at Grantham.

== Second World War ==
By November 1939, Young was a pilot officer on probation and was serving with No. 264 Squadron. This was a newly formed unit that was stationed at Martlesham Heath and working up with the new Boulton Paul Defiant turret fighter. By March 1940, the squadron's personnel had largely overcome the initial issues experienced with the Defiant and it was operational, doing patrol work along the English coast. Young had been confirmed in his pilot officer rank by this time, and was paired with Leading Aircraftsman Stanley Johnson as his gunner.

On 12 May, No. 264 Squadron carried out its first offensive sortie, a patrol over The Hague; the Netherlands had been invaded by the Germans two days previously. Young piloted one of six Defiants involved. Spotting a Junkers Ju 88 medium bomber attacking a vessel of the Royal Navy off the Dutch coast, Young's section of Defiants attacked. Johnson, his gunner, fired around 500 rounds from his machine-guns which set one of the engines of the Ju 88 on fire and it crashed into a field as it tried to escape inland. This was the first aerial victory for a pilot of the squadron. Later in the patrol, another Defiant destroyed a second German bomber.

=== Battle of France ===
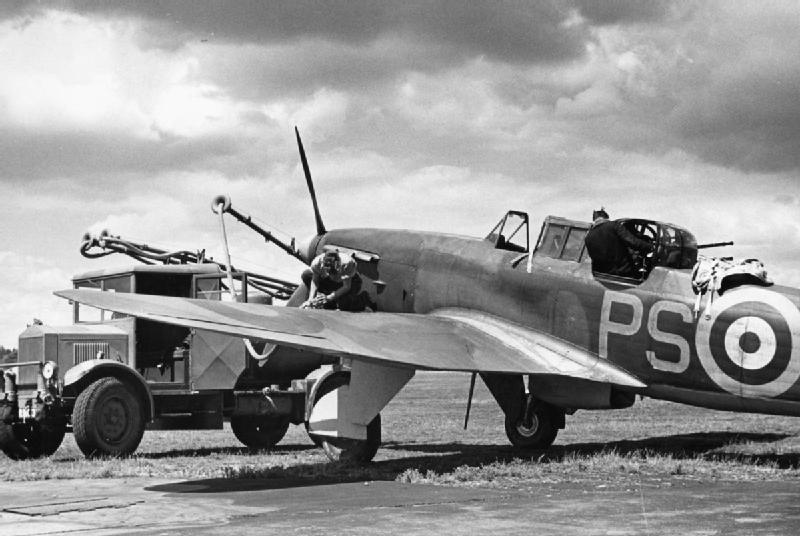
A Boulton Paul Defiant turret fighter of No. 264 Squadron, July 1940

From mid-May, No. 264 Squadron began flying sorties from Manston to France, patrolling between Dunkirk and Boulogne. In the morning of 27 May Young and Johnson shared in the shooting down of a Messerschmitt Bf 109 fighter over Dunkirk. On another sortie in the afternoon, they combined with another Defiant crew to destroy a Heinkel He 111 medium bomber near Calais. The next day the duo shot down a Bf 109 to the north of Dunkirk. On 29 May, they flew multiple sorties over Dunkirk. In the mid-afternoon they destroyed a Bf 109 and a Messerschmitt Bf 110 heavy fighter, and also shared in the destruction of a second Bf 110. That evening, they combined with other fighters to shoot down a pair of Junkers Ju 87 dive bombers and a Ju 88.

On 31 May, after shooting down a Bf 109 off Dunkirk, Young's aircraft collided with another Defiant, breaking up in midair. While Young was able to free himself and descend by parachute, Johnson was trapped and was killed when the wreckage of their Defiant landed in the sea. Young landed in Dunkirk and was repatriated back to England aboard HMS Malcolm, returning to Manston the next day. The crew of the other Defiant also survived and made their way back to Manston.

Over the period from 12 May, when Young claimed his first victory, to the end of May, No. 264 Squadron had claimed around 65 German aircraft as destroyed, although this was almost certainly overstated the Luftwaffe's actual losses. Its own losses over Dunkirk were high, as the German fighter pilots quickly developed tactics for dealing with the Defiants.

=== Battle of Britain ===
No. 264 Squadron moved to Fowlmere in early June and then onto Kirton-in-Lindsey the following month, flying for several weeks on night fighting duties and dawn patrols. However, the squadron was largely unsuccessful in its night fighter role, achieving only one aerial victory during this time. Young was now paired with Sergeant Leslie Russell as his gunner.

On 24 August, No. 264 Squadron returned to Manston to help relieve the hard pressed RAF fighter squadrons in the south of England. In the afternoon, Young and Russell were among the Defiant crews scrambled to intercept an approaching group of German bombers over the Thames Estuary. They engaged and destroyed a He 111 to the south of Colchester. After more losses in engagements with the Luftwaffe, the squadron returned to Kirton-in-Lindsey and to night fighting duties at the end of the month. For the next several months, there were few encounters with German aircraft. During this time Young was promoted to flying officer and in February 1941 was recognised for his successes with an award of the Distinguished Flying Cross (DFC).

In May, No. 264 was switched to offensive work, carrying out intruder sorties to German-occupied France. On the night of 8/9 May Young, still paired with Russell, shot down a Bf 110 over the airfield at Merville. A few months later, Young was attached to No. 1422 Flight, which was experimenting with Hawker Hurricane fighters working in combination with Turbinlite Douglas Havocs.

=== Later war service ===
In September 1941 Young was posted to No. 73 Squadron, in Egypt, as one of its flight leaders. This unit, operating Hurricanes, was based at El Gamil as part of the night time defences of Port Said. Young was promoted to flight lieutenant in November. On 14 January 1942, he damaged a Bf 109 in the vicinity of El Adem.

In May Young was promoted to acting squadron leader and appointed commander of No. 213 Squadron, another Egypt-based unit. Like his previous squadron, this operated the Hurricane but from Landing Ground 12. It was engaged in ground support operations during the fighting at El Alamein but occasionally engaged the Luftwaffe. On 5 July Young damaged a Ju 88 and on 16 September damaged a Bf 109. The next month, he relinquished command of the squadron.

Young then took up instructing duties at No. 71 Operational Training Unit which was based in Sudan although it moved to Egypt in April 1943. He returned to operations with a posting to Italy to serve with No. 600 Squadron in October. Based in Sicily, this operated the twin-engined Bristol Beaufighter heavy fighter although Young saw no action during his time with the squadron. This was followed by periods of service with Nos. 43 and 93 Squadrons, both being fighter units involved in the Italian campaign. Mentioned in despatches on 14 January 1944, Young returned to the United Kingdom in March.

After a brief period of service at the headquarters of the RAF station at West Malling, in April Young was attached to the staff of the flying school at Cranwell. Still serving in this capacity by the end of the war in Europe, his substantive rank was made up to squadron leader in July. He ended his RAF service in January 1946.

== Later life ==
Returning to civilian life, Young studied brewing at the University of Birmingham, after which he joined the Cobbold brewery in Ipswich. He later worked for the Whitbread brewing concern rising to a senior management role with responsibility for the southwest of England before his retirement to Gloucestershire. He died in January 1998.

Young is credited with having destroyed thirteen aircraft, six of which were shared with other Defiant crews, and damaging three others.
