= Francis Dawson-Paul =

- Born: 18 February 1916; Chelsea, London
- Died: 30 July 1940 (aged 24); France
- Burial place: Hardinghen churchyard, France
- Military career
- Allegiance: United Kingdom
- Branch: Royal Air Force (1934–37); Royal Navy (1939–40)
- Service years: 1934–1937; 1939–1940
- Rank: Sub-Lieutenant
- Unit: Fleet Air Arm
- Conflicts: Second World War

Francis Dawson-Paul (18 February 1916 – 30 July 1940) was a fighter ace in the Fleet Air Arm of the Royal Navy during the Second World War. He was seconded to the Royal Air Force during the Battle of Britain, serving with No. 64 Squadron RAF. Between 1 and 25 July he shot down seven and a half German aircraft before being shot down himself over the English Channel. Taken prisoner by the crew of a German E-boat he died of his wounds five days later. In those 24 days of combat he became the first naval air ace of the battle and the highest scoring naval ace on the Supermarine Spitfire, a record which still stood by the end of the war.

== Early life and career ==
Francis Dawson-Paul was born on 18 February 1916 in Chelsea, London, the son of Joseph Dawson Paul (the chairman and managing director of Boulton & Paul Ltd) and Flavie Leonie Paul. He was educated at Stanmore House Preparatory School and then Harrow School. In 1934 he gained a commission in the Reserve of Air Force Officers and reached the rank of flight lieutenant before having to resign due to ill health on 5 May 1937, owing to injuries received in a motorcycle accident in 1936. He later joined Chrislea Aircraft as test pilot, and in January 1939 became a flying instructor at the London Busmen's Flying Club at Broxbourne, Hertfordshire.

== Second World War ==
Dawson-Paul enlisted in the Fleet Air Arm of the Royal Navy when war was declared and commissioned as a temporary sub-lieutenant in the Royal Navy Volunteer Reserve (RNVR) on 26 September 1939. He then commenced training with 758 Naval Air Squadron at HMS Raven at Eastleigh. A shortage of fighter pilots just prior to the Battle of Britain led to the Fleet Air Arm asking for volunteers to serve with the Royal Air Force (RAF) Fighter Command. Dawson-Paul was one of 23 naval aviators who volunteered to be seconded to the RAF.

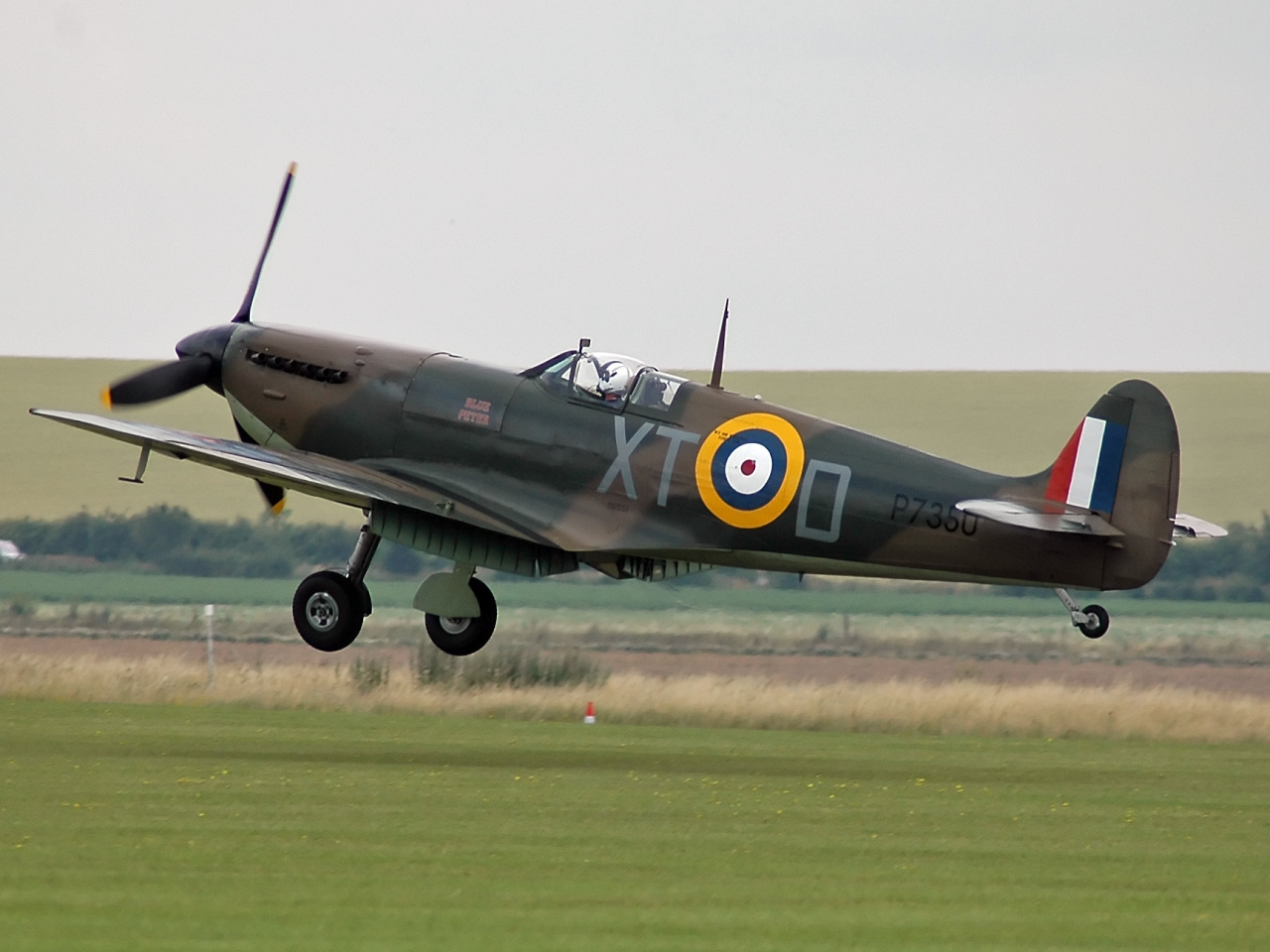
A Supermarine Spitfire taking off.

Sub-Lieutenant Francis Dawson-Paul was posted to No. 7 Operational Training Unit at Hawarden, North Wales, for a conversion course to the Supermarine Spitfire on 23 June. (Note: At the time the Fleet Air Arm Fighters were the Sea Gladiator biplane the Fairey Fulmar, the Blackburn Roc, the Blackburn Skua two seated fighters and the American Grumman Martlet which had started to arrive in small numbers.) After the course he was posted to No. 64 Squadron RAF which at the time was based at RAF Kenley located to the south of London. The squadron had been issued with the Supermarine Spitfire in April 1940, a type of plane not yet in use with the Fleet Air Arm. Before Dawson-Paul joined them they had been working over the beaches of Dunkirk providing air cover for Operation Dynamo the evacuation of the British Expeditionary Force. Dawson-Paul arrived at RAF Kenley on 1 July, he was involved in operations from the first day assisting in the destruction of a Dornier Do 17, the first of the naval pilots seconded to the RAF to put in a claim. He later described the action in detail:

As Blue 2 I was ordered to scramble with Blue section at 1830 hours to patrol base at 20,000 feet (6,100 m). I first reported a streak of white smoke, which I identified was condensing exhaust gases coming from what I thought was the enemy aircraft. This streak was about 14 miles (23 km) ahead and to the starboard of me-I was about 2 miles (3.2 km) behind Blue 1, as my engine was not giving full power.

Crossing the coast I passed a section of Hurricanes and as I drew nearer I saw another section in line astern preparing to attack. I concluded that the enemy aircraft must have sighted the Hurricanes and Blue 1, as it started to take evasive action and lost height in a steep spiral. I followed down drawing towards it and after the Hurricanes and Blue 1 had delivered their attacks, I overhauled it and opened fire at approximately 150 yards (140 m)s, closing up to about 50 yards (46 m) as I gave it three bursts.I saw my bullets enter the rear portion of the enemy aircraft. I broke away to port, gained height and delivered another attack from the rear.

This time the enemy aircraft turned to port and I broke to starboard and I was just positioning myself for another attack when I saw the enemy aircraft strike the water and sink almost at once. My aircraft was hit four times, twice in the starboard main plane and twice underneath the rudder.I returned to Kenly at approximately 1955 hours.

Dawson-Paul's first outright victory was four days later on 5 July when he shot down a Messerschmitt Bf 109 over Rouen; on his way home he made a forced landing at RAF Hawkinge. His next victim was a Messerschmitt Bf 110 on 7 July, followed by two more Messerschmitt Bf 110s shot down on 13 July and a third claimed as probably shot down. He shot down his second Dornier Do 17 on 24 July. His final victory was a Messerschmitt Bf 109 of JG 26 on 25 July, unfortunately he was also shot down himself later the same day. Severely wounded, he was picked up from the English Channel by a German E-boat, becoming a prisoner of war. He died of his wounds five days later on 30 July 1940 and was buried in the Hardinghen churchyard in France.

== Legacy ==
Sub-Lieutenant Francis Dawson-Paul was the first naval ace of the Second World War. His seven and a half confirmed victories and one probable places him eighth on the list of Royal Navy aces during the conflict. If the list did not include shared victories he would be second. All his victories were achieved during 25 days in July 1940, but by the end of the war he was still the leading naval ace on the Supermarine Spitfire. To recognise his achievements in May 2010, the Falkland Islands included him on a postage stamp issued to commemorate the seventieth Anniversary of the Battle of Britain.

== Notes ==
Footnotes

Citations
