= Nicholas Gresham Cooke =

British flying ace (1913–1940)

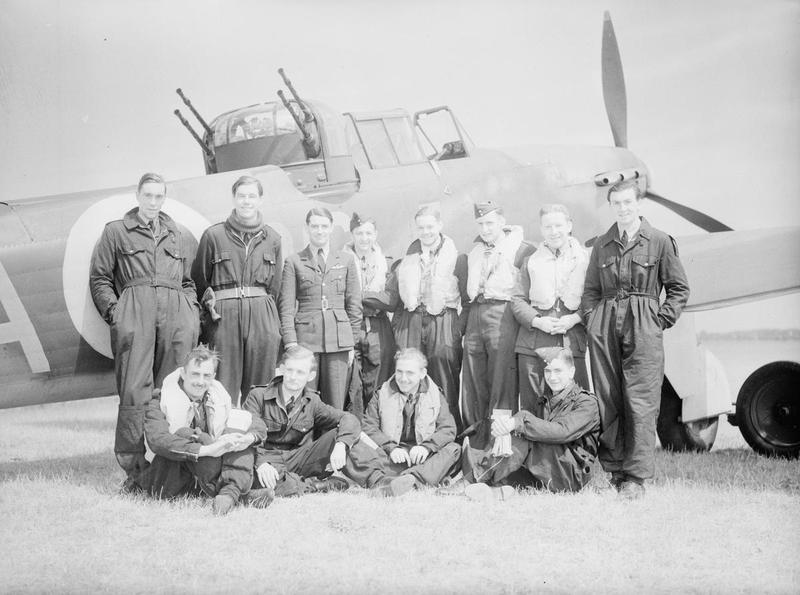
- "Lanky" Cooke (2nd from left), Philip Hunter (3rd left) standing, with No. 264 Squadron
- Born: Nicholas Gresham Cooke; 26 August 1913; Norfolk, England
- Died: 31 May 1940 (aged 26); English Channel, off Dunkirk, France
- Burial place: Missing (Unknown)
- Military career
- Allegiance: United Kingdom
- Branch: Royal Air Force
- Service years: 1936–1940
- Rank: Flight Lieutenant
- Nickname: Lanky
- Service number: 37652
- Unit: No. 264 Squadron RAF
- Conflicts: Second World War
- Awards: Distinguished Flying Cross

Nicholas Gresham Cooke, DFC (26 August 1913 – 31 May 1940), nicknamed "Lanky", was a Royal Air Force pilot and Second World War flying ace most notable as an ace in a day. He was killed in action over the Dunkirk evacuation beaches.

== Early life ==
Nicholas Gresham Cooke was the son of Arthur and Lucy Vivien Cooke of Up Hall, Cherry Hinton, Cambridge. His father was Dr Arthur Cooke, FRCS, senior surgeon to Addenbrooke's Hospital, and a brother was Roger Gresham Cooke, MP.

He was educated at Marlborough College and Trinity College, Cambridge. Following this, he became an aeronautical engineer and learned to fly with Air Service Training Limited, gaining a Civil Pilot's Licence (No. 12947) on 15 July 1935.

The following year, Cooke joined the Royal Air Force and passed out from the Royal Air Force College Cranwell as an acting pilot officer on 23 March 1936. On 10 January 1937, he joined No. 46 Squadron, a recently re-formed fighter squadron, flying Gloster Gauntlet aircraft, from RAF Digby in Lincolnshire. On 24 February, he was confirmed in his rank as pilot officer. On 15 August 1938, he was posted to No. 23 Group based at Grantham, Lincolnshire, as personal assistant to its commander, Air Vice Marshal Lawrence Pattinson. He was then promoted to flying officer on 27 August 1938.

== Second World War ==
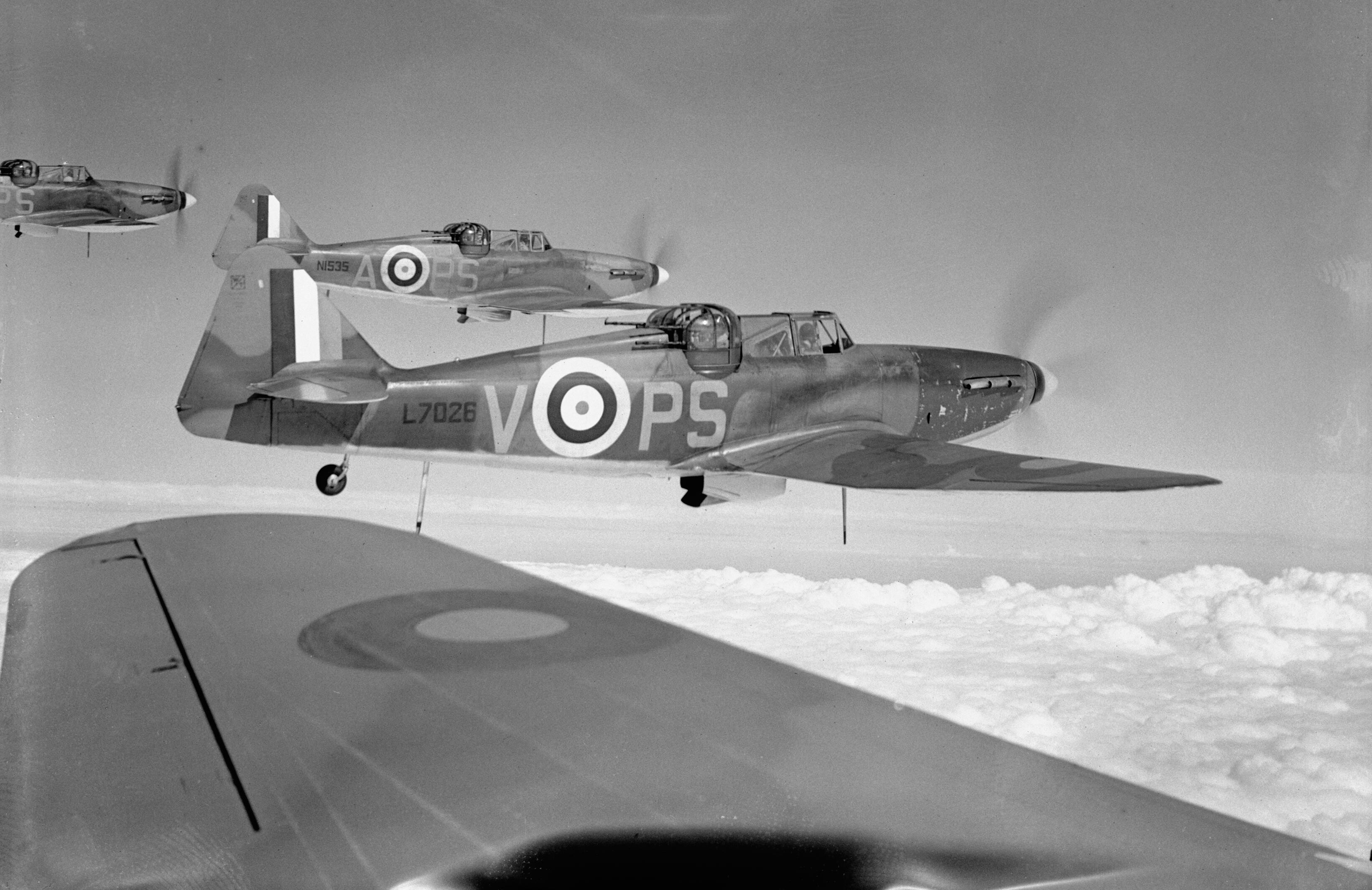
A pair of No. 264 Squadron Defiants

When No. 264 Squadron was re-formed at Sutton Bridge in October 1939, Cooke joined as a flight commander, to fly the Boulton Paul Defiant aircraft. An unusual fighter for its era, the Defiant had a single engine and was armed with four Browning .303 Mark II machine-guns, in a rear turret operated by an air gunner but had no fixed forward firing guns. In early operations, the Defiant was often mistaken for the similar shaped Hawker Hurricane by German pilots who dived to attack from above and behind, into the blind spot of a Hurricane but directly into the fire from the Defiant turret.

On posting to No. 264 Squadron, Cooke teamed up with Acting Corporal Albert Lippett, a married 37-year-old RAF veteran originally from Great Yarmouth, who lived at Dunfermline. Lippett had joined the RAF aged 17 and completed a 12-year engagement before discharge, only to rejoin for four more years from 1935 to 1939. He was working in an aircraft factory when he was recalled for service in September 1939. On 12 May 1940, operating over the Dutch coast, Cooke and Lippett shot down a Heinkel He 111 medium bomber and on 27 May 1940 they joined several other Defiants to destroy another over Dunkirk. They had a big success at about 15:15 hours on 29 May 1940, in two patrols above the Dunkirk beaches, when they shot down two Messerschmitt Bf 109 fighters, a Messerschmitt Bf 110 twin engine fighter and then five Junkers Ju 87 Stuka dive bombers at about 19:30 hours. During the afternoon, they joined in the destruction of two Junkers Ju 88 bombers, which brought their score to nine victories and three shared.

Two days later, while in action over the Dunkirk beaches against a formation of He 111s and escorting Bf 109s, their flight of Defiants was attacked and Cooke and Lippett's Boulton Paul Defiant Mark I (serial number L6975), was shot down. Both men were lost when it crashed into the sea and were listed as killed in action. He has no known grave and is commemorated on the Runnymede Memorial. A memorial was later erected to Cooke at Blakeney in Norfolk.

== Honours and awards ==
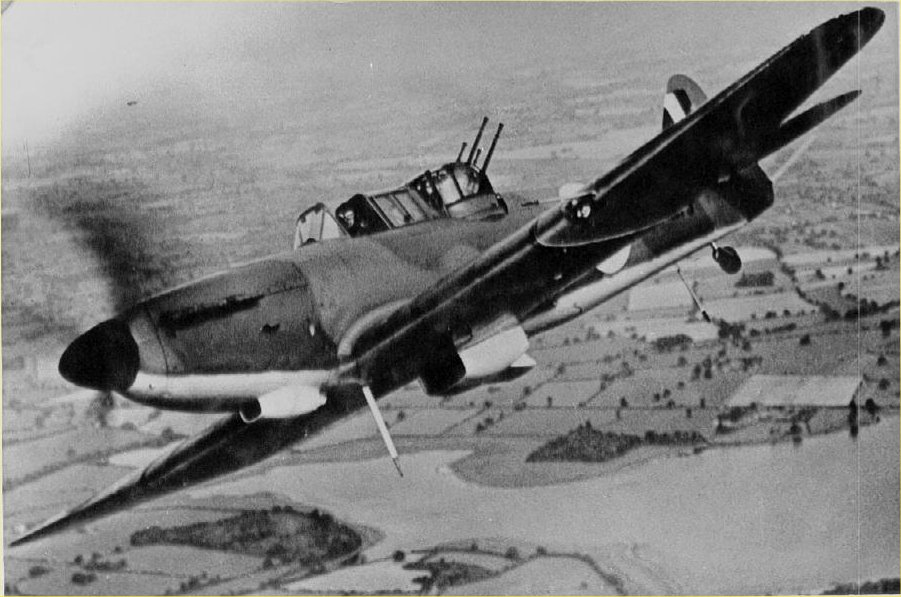
Defiant Mk 1

- 14 June 1940 – Flight Lieutenant Nicholas Gresham Cooke (37652), was awarded the Distinguished Flying Cross

In May 1940, this officer acting as a flight leader, was responsible for shooting down eight enemy aircraft during the course of two patrols.

- 14 June 1940 – 348030 Acting Corporal Albert Lippett was awarded the Distinguished Flying Medal

This airman was air gunner in the aircraft piloted by Flight Lieutenant N. G. Cooke on the occasion when he destroyed eight enemy aircraft in the course of two patrols during one day. By his coolness and good shooting he shares the credit of this achievement.

== See also ==
- List of World War II flying aces

== Bibliography ==
- Bull, Stephen (2004). Encyclopedia of Military Technology and Innovation. Westport, Connecticut: Greenwood Publishing Group. ISBN 9781573565578.
- Green, William (1961). War Planes of the Second World War: Fighters. Vol. 2. London: Macdonald & Company. OCLC 601569501.
- Franks, Norman (1983). The Air Battle of Dunkirk. London: William Kimber. ISBN 0-7183-0349-0.
- Franks, Norman (1997). Royal Air Force Fighter Command Losses. Vol. 1. Earl Shilton: Midland Counties. ISBN 1-857800559.
- Foreman, John (1996). The Fighter Command War Diaries. Walton-on-Thames: Air Research. ISBN 1-871187-34-6.
- Foreman, John (2003). RAF Fighter Command Victory Claims. Part One. Walton-on-Thames: Red Kite. ISBN 0-9538061-8-9.
- Shores, Christopher (1994). Aces High. London: Grub Street. ISBN 1-898697-00-0.
- Thomas, Andrew (2012). Defiant, Blenheim and Havoc Aces. London: Osprey. ISBN 978-1849086660.
- Winchester, Jim (2005). "Boulton Paul Defiant". The World's Worst Aircraft: From Pioneering Failures to Multimillion Dollar Disasters. London: Amber Books. ISBN 1-904687-34-2.
