= Philip Hunter (RAF officer) =

British World War II flying ace

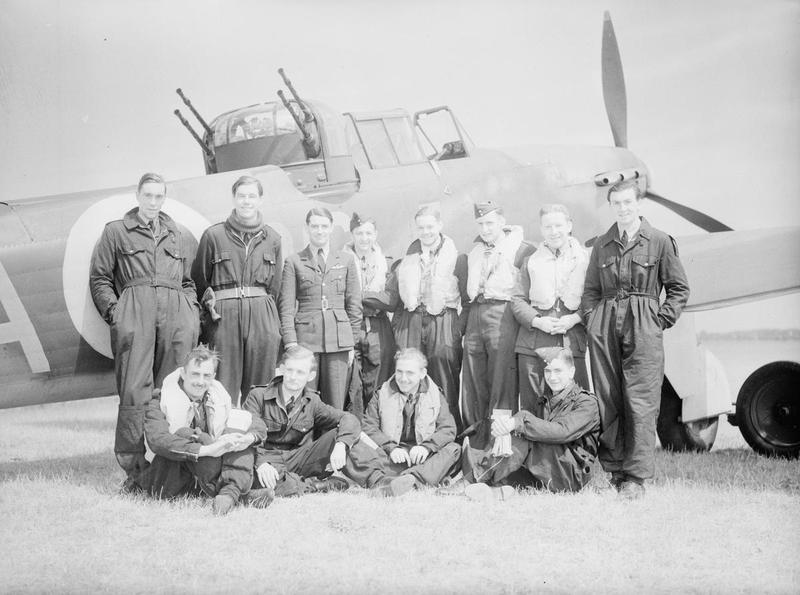
- Phil Hunter, standing third from left, with his squadron c.1940
- Born: 11 April 1913; Frimley, Surrey
- Died: 24 August 1940 (aged 27); English Channel
- Military career
- Allegiance: United Kingdom
- Branch: Royal Air Force
- Service years: 1931–1940
- Rank: Squadron Leader
- Service number: 32081
- Unit: No. 25 Squadron RAF
- Commands: No. 264 Squadron RAF
- Conflicts: Second World War: Battle of France; Battle of Britain
- Awards: Distinguished Service Order; Mentioned in Despatches

Philip Hunter, DSO (11 April 1913 – 24 August 1940) was a Royal Air Force pilot, squadron commander and a Second World War flying ace, awarded the Distinguished Service Order for leading the destruction of thirty-eight enemy aircraft in only two missions over the Dunkirk evacuation beaches in May 1940. He was killed in action leading his squadron during the Battle of Britain.

== Early life ==
Philip Hunter was born in Frimley, Surrey, the son of Captain Albert and Clare Hunter. He was educated at King's School, Canterbury from September 1922 until July 1924, then at Rosslyn House, Felixstowe and Bishop Stortford School.

== Royal Air Force ==
Hunter joined the Royal Air Force, passing out from the Royal Air Force College Cranwell as a probationary pilot officer on 11 September 1931. He completed his flying training at No. 5 Flying Training School (Sealand). On 29 August 1932 he joined No. 25 Squadron based at RAF Hawkinge, flying Hawker Fury fighters. On 11 September 1932 he was confirmed in his rank as a pilot officer. On 28 February 1933 he was posted to No. 6 Squadron RAF, then based at Ismailia in Egypt, flying Fairey Gordon light bombers and was promoted to flying officer on 11 April 1933. He was promoted to flight lieutenant on 11 April 1936, and returned to England and joined the staff of the Royal Air Force College Cranwell on 9 November 1936. He was then posted to the Central Flying School at RAF Upavon as a Senior Instructor. He was promoted to squadron leader on 1 December 1938. His biography has recently been published in the "Fighter Leaders" collection volume 2. and his flying logbook and medals donated to the Kent Battle of Britain Museum.

== Wartime service ==
The urgent need for wartime leaders resulted in Hunter being posted to command No. 254 Squadron RAF when it formed in October 1939, flying Bristol Blenheim twin engine fighters. He held command until January 1940 when his skills were more urgently required elsewhere.

No. 264 Squadron RAF was re-formed at RAF Sutton Bridge in October 1939 and in March 1940 Hunter joined the squadron as commanding officer to fly the Boulton Paul Defiant An unusual fighter design, the single engine Defiant was armed with four 0.303 in (7.7 mm) Browning machine guns in a rear turret operated by an air gunner.

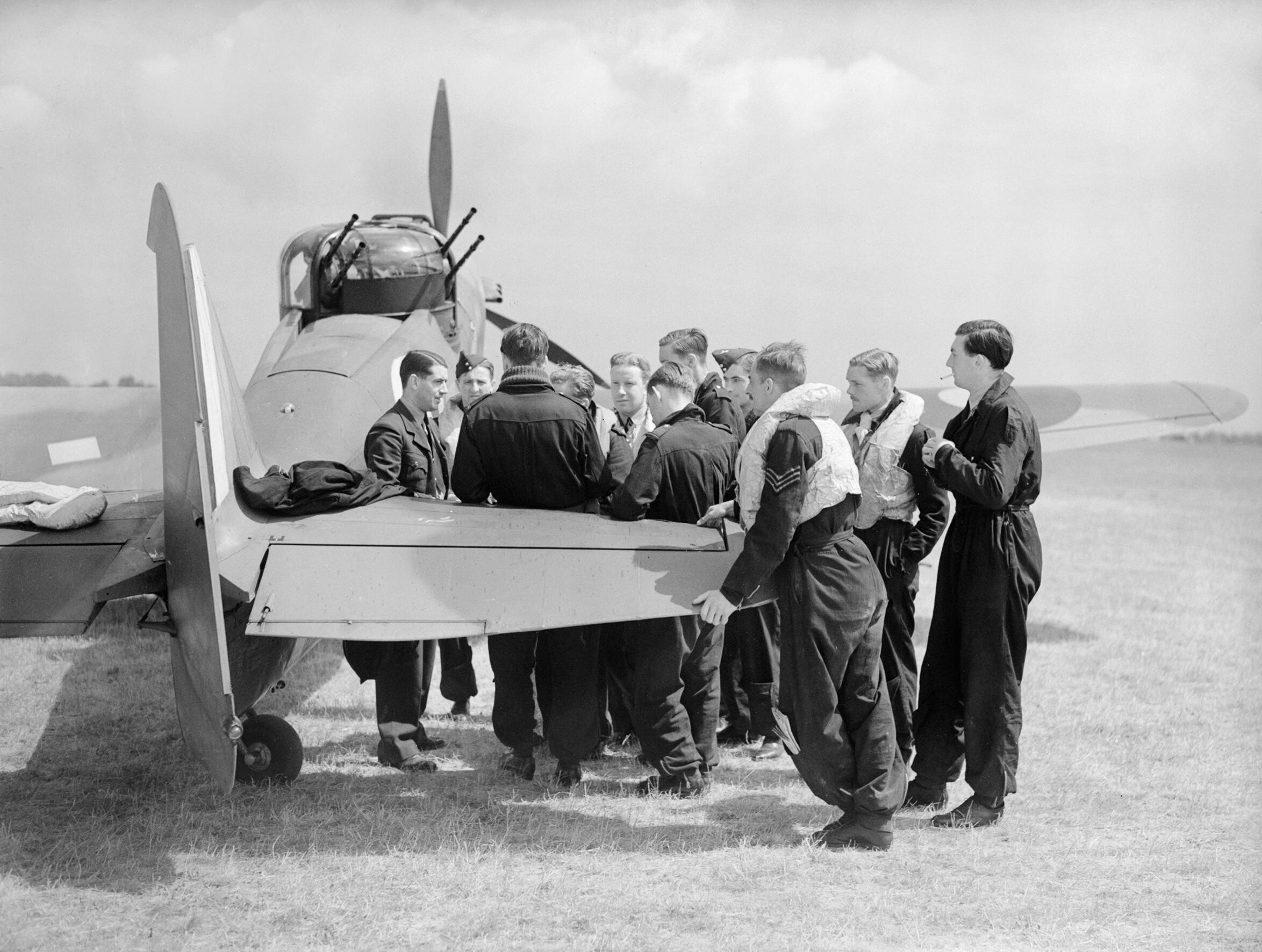
Phil Hunter DSO (at left) briefs his pilots on 31 May 1940.

One of his flight commanders was Nicholas Gresham Cooke and his regular air gunner was Aircraftman Frederick Harry King, a regular service RAF air gunner from Leicester. In early operations the Defiant was often mistaken for the similar shaped Hawker Hurricane by German pilots, who dived to attack from above and behind; the blind spot for a Hurricane pilot, but directly into the fire from the gunner's turret on a Defiant.

On 12 May 1940, operating over the Dutch coast, they shot down a Junkers Ju 88 bomber. On 27 May 1940 they shot down a Messerschmitt Bf 109 and joined several other Defiants to destroy another over Dunkirk, while on 28 May 1940 they shot down two Bf 109s. The major successes of 264 Squadron came in patrols on 29 May 1940 when they entered combat at about 15:15 hours and a second time at 19:30 hours and shot down a total of thirty-eight enemy aircraft. During the first of these two patrols above the Dunkirk beaches Hunter and King shot down a Bf 109, a twin engine aircraft (either a Ju 88 or a Bf 110), and then a Ju 87 dive bomber On 31 May 1940 the team shot down another Bf 109, a Heinkel He 111 and possibly a second Heinkel. This brought their score to 9 victories and 1 shared plus another possibly destroyed.

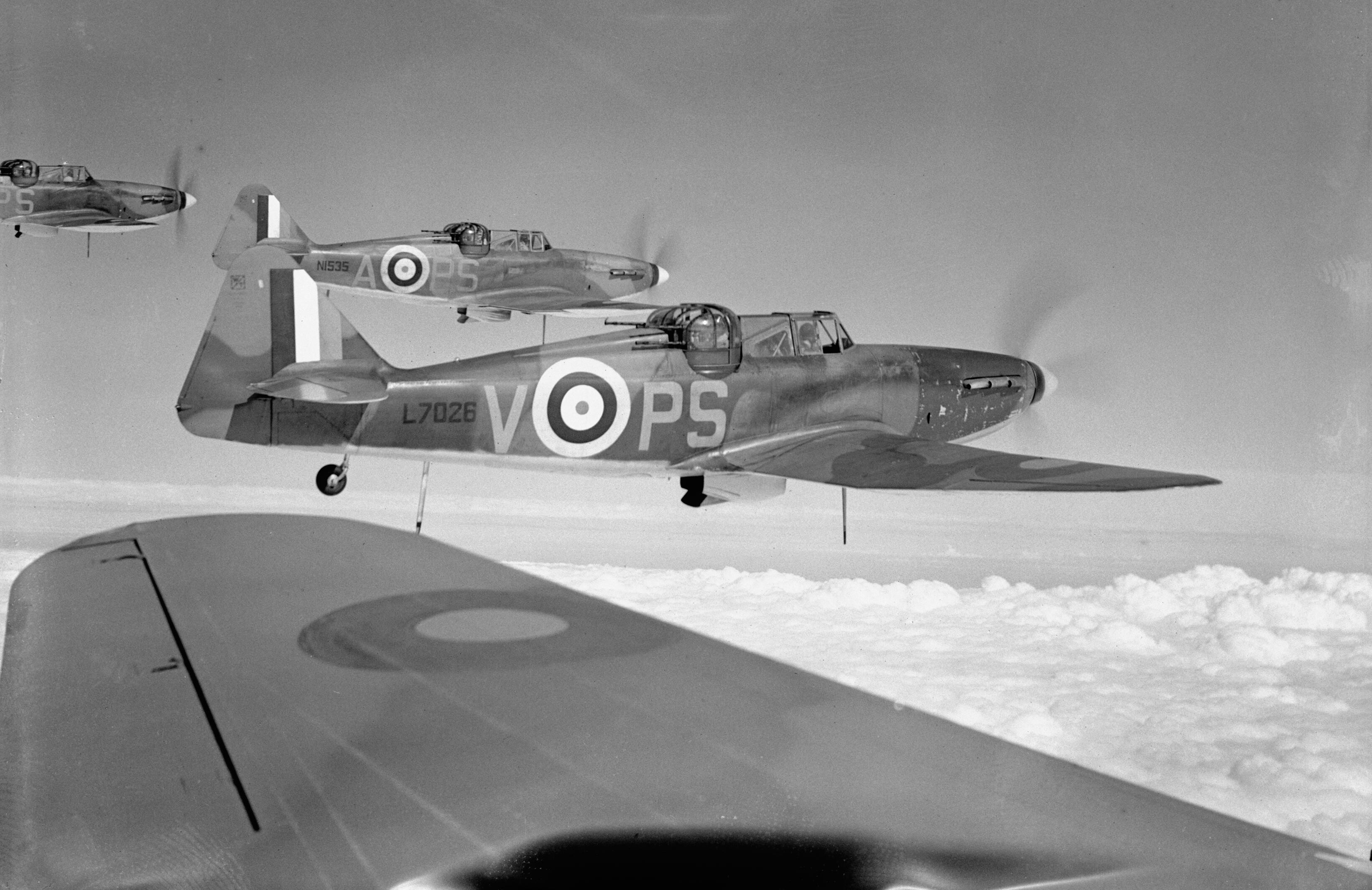
A pair of No. 264 Sqn. Defiants. The Squadron Leader's aircraft "A" can be seen in the image at the top of the page.

After the completion of the Dunkirk evacuation the Luftwaffe had gained operational experience in fighting against the Defiant, which had therefore become an extremely vulnerable aircraft to operate in daylight against formations escorted by fighters. The months after Dunkirk were spent rebuilding the squadron, which had suffered heavy losses.

== Death ==
In the five days from 24 to 28 August 1940, 264 Squadron was almost wiped out, losing 3 aircraft and crews each day on 24, 26 and 28 August. On 24 August, while in action against a formation of Ju 88s which had just bombed RAF Manston, Defiant serial number N1535 (fuselage codes PS-A) was last seen chasing an enemy bomber out to sea. Both of its crew were posted missing when they failed to return. Both Hunter and King were killed in action.

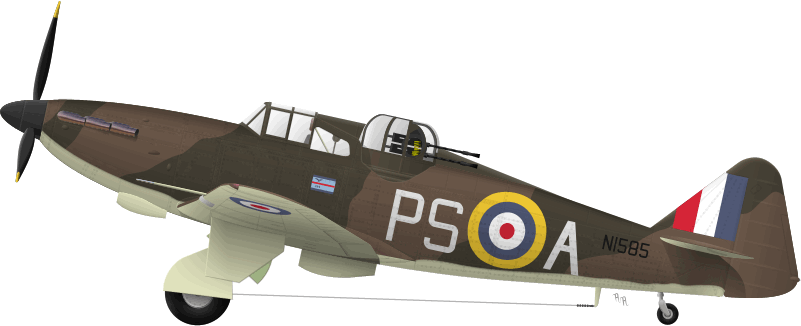
Defiant Mk.I N1585, PS-A of No. 264 Sqn., RAF Kirton in Lindsey, July 1940

== Honours and awards ==
- 14 June 1940 – Awarded the Distinguished Service Order.

His citation in the London Gazette states:

In May 1940, under the leadership of Squadron Leader Hunter, his squadron shot down thirty-eight enemy aircraft during the course of two patrols. He personally destroyed three of that number. His brilliant leadership as well as his example and courage are of the highest standard.

- 1 January 1941 – Mentioned in Despatches.

== See also ==
- List of World War II flying aces

== Bibliography ==
- Sarkar, Dilip (2010). The Few: The story of the Battle of Britain in the words of the pilots. Amberley Publishing. ISBN 978-1445600505.
- Listerman, Phil (2015). Fighter Leaders, volume 2. Philedition. ISBN 978-2918590668.
- Franks, Norman (1997). Royal Air Force Fighter Command Losses, Volume 1. Earl Shilton: Midland Counties. ISBN 1-857800559.
- Shores, Christopher (1994). Aces High. London: Grub Street. ISBN 1-898697-00-0.
- Foreman, John (2003). RAF Fighter Command Victory Claims, Part One. Walton-on-Thames: Red Kite. ISBN 0-9538061-8-9.
- Mason, Francis (1969). Battle Over Britain. London: McWhirter Brothers. ISBN 0-901928-00-3.
- Franks, Norman (1983). The Air Battle of Dunkirk. London: William Kimber. ISBN 0-7183-0349-0.
- Thomas, Andrew (2012). Defiant, Blenheim and Havoc Aces. London: Osprey Publishing. ISBN 978-1849086660.
- Foreman, John (1996). The Fighter Command War Diaries. Walton-on-Thames: Air Research. ISBN 1-871187-34-6.
- Shores, Christopher (1999). Aces High, Volume 2. London: Grub Street. ISBN 1-898697-00-0.
- Wynn, Kenneth (1989). Men of the Battle of Britain. Norfolk: Gliddon. ISBN 0947893156.
- Ramsey, Winston (1989). Battle of Britain: Then and Now -V. London: After The Battle. ISBN 0-900913-46-0.
