= No. 264 Squadron RAF =

Former flying squadron of the Royal Air Force

No. 264 (Madras Presidency) Squadron RAF
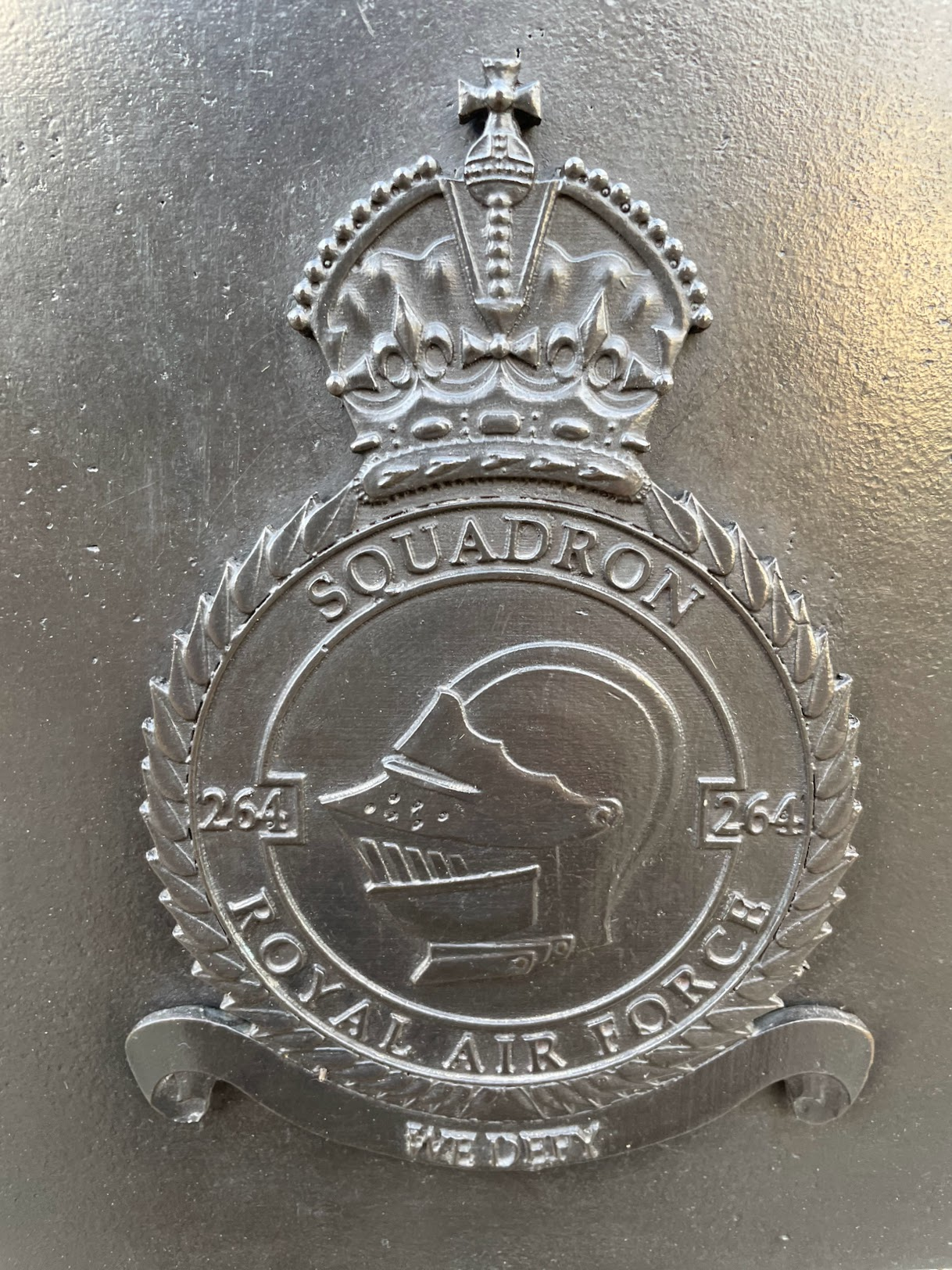
- The heraldic badge of the squadron as it appears on the Battle of Britain Monument in London.
- Active: 27 Sep 1918–1 Mar 1919; 30 Oct 1939–25 Aug 1945; 20 Nov 1945–1 Oct 1957; 1 Dec 1958–20 Nov 1962
- Country: United Kingdom
- Branch: Royal Air Force
- Part of: RAF Air Command
- Nickname: Madras Presidency
- Motto: We Defy

Insignia
- Squadron Codes: WA (Apr 1939–Sep 1939); PS (Mar 1940–Aug 1945, May 1947–Feb 1952); VA (Nov 1945–May 1947)
- Post-1950 squadron roundel

No. 264 Squadron RAF, also known as No. 264 (Madras Presidency) Squadron, was a squadron of the Royal Air Force.

== World War I ==
No. 264 Squadron was first formed during the First World War, from two former Royal Naval Air Service flights, No. 439 and No. 440, on 27 September 1918 at Souda Bay, Crete. It performed anti-submarine patrols with Short 184 floatplanes, over the Aegean Sea. The squadron was disbanded, following the end of the war, on 1 March 1919.

== World War II ==
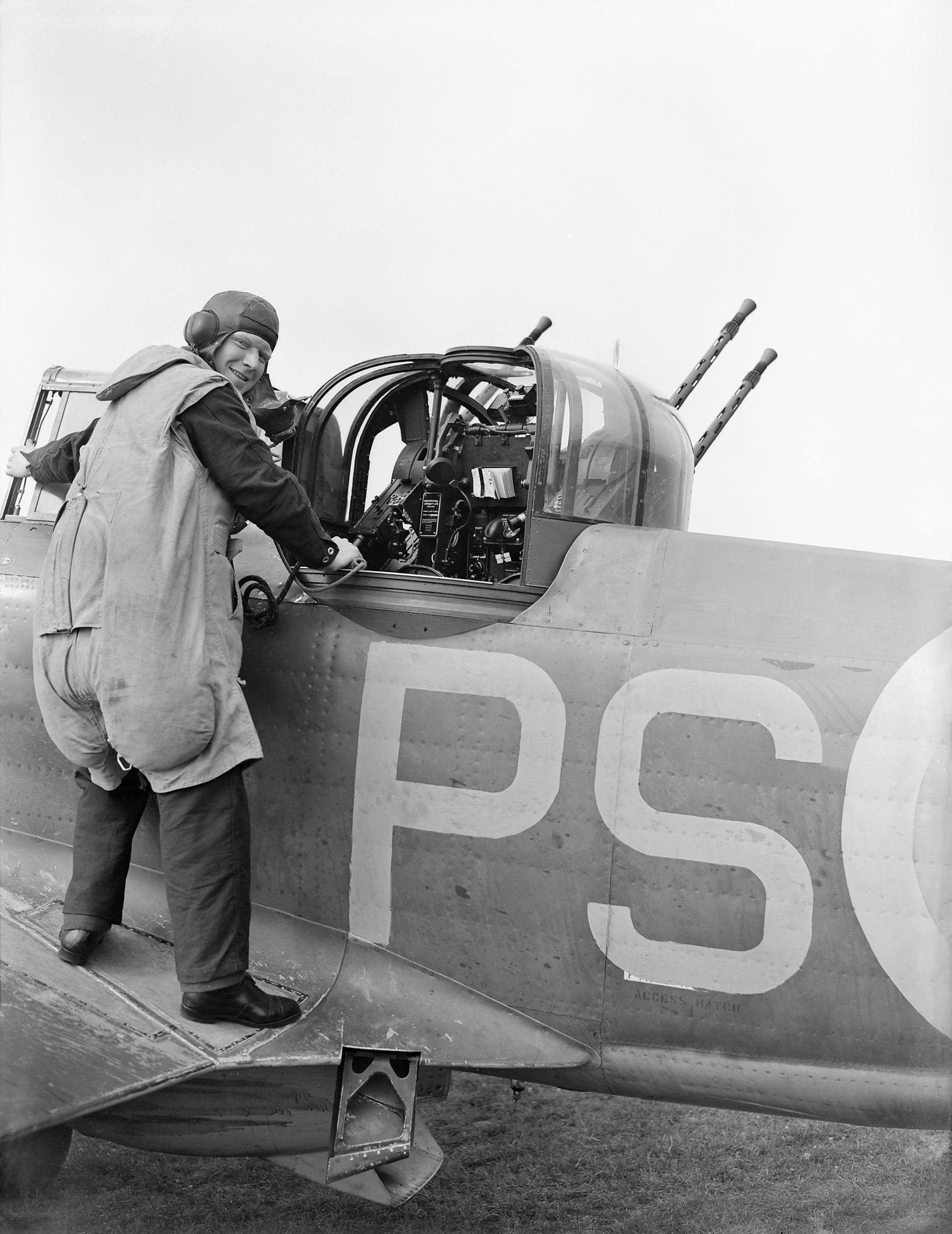
Boulton Paul Defiant gunner of No. 264 Squadron entering his turret at RAF Kirton in Lindsey

On 30 October 1939 No. 264 Squadron was re-formed at Sutton Bridge to bring the Boulton Paul Defiant fighter into service. After a move to Martlesham Heath, operations began in March 1940 when the squadron started convoy patrols. After initial successes, the Luftwaffe soon realised that the Defiant was vulnerable to frontal attack, and the squadron started to have heavy losses of aircraft and crew. At the end of May the squadron was withdrawn from day fighting operations and began to train in the night fighter role. It was called into action again in day fighting at the height of the Battle of Britain in late August, but again suffered losses and returned to night fighting. After a number of moves around England, in May 1942 the squadron moved to RAF Colerne to operate the de Havilland Mosquito II, later trading them in for the later Mark VI. The Mosquitos were operated as night fighters in the west of England, and on day patrols in the Bay of Biscay and western approaches.

In 1943, after concentrating on night intruder missions, the squadron operated in support of Bomber Command, defending bomber formations against enemy night-fighters. In 1944 it re-equipped with the newer Mosquito XIII and returned to defensive roles. In June it carried out patrols over the Normandy beaches, until returning to night patrols from western England in the western approaches. As the Allied forces advanced in mainland Europe, the squadron became part of the 2nd Tactical Air Force providing night patrols. By the end of the war it was carrying out patrols over Berlin from its airfield at Twente in the Netherlands. It was disbanded at Twente in August 1945.

== Postwar operations ==
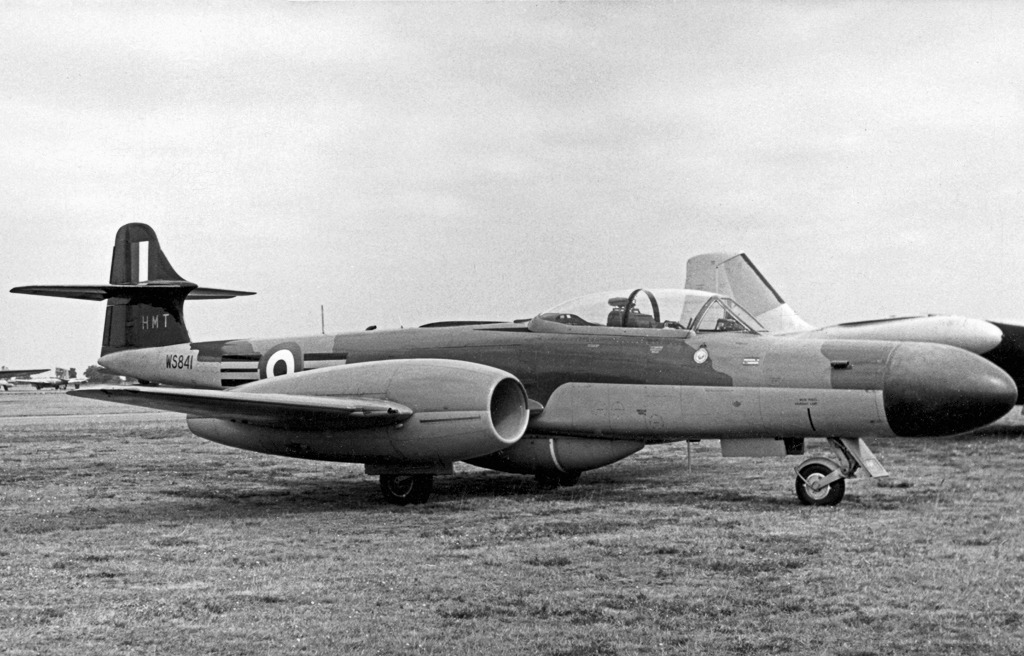
Gloster Meteor NF.14 of 264 Squadron in 1955

The squadron was re-formed again on 20 November 1945 at RAF Church Fenton when No. 125 Squadron was renumbered. It operated the de Havilland Mosquito NF30 and NF36 in the night fighter role as part of the peacetime Fighter Command. By 1951 the squadron was posted to RAF Linton-on-Ouse, where that November its Mosquitos were replaced by the Gloster Meteor NF11, and in October 1954 by the Meteor NF14. From February 1957 the squadron was based at RAF Middleton St George until 30 September 1957, when it was disbanded after being re-numbered 33 Squadron at RAF Leeming.

The squadron was in existence again between 1958 and 1962 at RAF North Coates as the first squadron to operate the Bristol Bloodhound I ground-to-air missile.

== Aircraft operated ==
- 1918–1919 Short 184
- 1939–1941 Boulton Paul Defiant I
- 1941–1942 Boulton Paul Defiant II
- 1942–1944 de Havilland Mosquito II
- 1943–1943 de Havilland Mosquito VI
- 1943–1945 de Havilland Mosquito XIII
- 1945–1946 de Havilland Mosquito NF30
- 1946–1952 de Havilland Mosquito NF36
- 1951–1954 Gloster Meteor NF11
- 1954–1957 Gloster Meteor NF14
- 1958–1962 Bristol Bloodhound I

== See also ==
- List of Royal Air Force aircraft squadrons
