= Matt Osborne (RAF airman) =

- Albert Osborne
- Born: Albert Matthew Osborne; 19 October 1906; Grimsby, England
- Died: 2 April 1942 (aged 35); Malta
- Burial place: Capuccini Naval Cemetery, Malta
- Military career
- Allegiance: United Kingdom
- Branch: Royal Air Force
- Service years: 1940–1942
- Rank: Leading Aircraftman
- Nickname: Matt
- Service number: 1058637
- Conflicts: World War II: Mediterranean and Middle East theatre; Siege of Malta †
- Awards: George Cross

Leading Aircraftman Albert Matthew Osborne GC (19 October 1906 – 2 April 1942), known as Matt Osborne, of the Royal Air Force Volunteer Reserve was awarded a posthumous George Cross for his "unsurpassed courage and devotion to duty" during German air attacks on Malta.

Among his many acts of valour, he made safe torpedoes in burning aircraft, rescued a pilot from a burning plane and worked to rescue trapped airmen amid heavy enemy bombing. He was killed on 2 April 1942 by an explosion while firefighting in a similarly courageous manner.

He enlisted in the RAF in July 1940.

== George Cross citation ==
His citation was published in the London Gazette on 10 July 1942:

The King has been graciously pleased to approve the posthumous award of the George Cross to 1058637 Leading Aircraftman Albert Matthew Osborne, Royal Air Force.

- During a period of fierce enemy air attacks on Malta, Leading Aircraftman Osborne has displayed unsurpassed courage and devotion to duty. In circumstances of the greatest danger, he was always first at hand to deal with emergencies, whether in firefighting operations or rescue work. The following are examples of his promptitude and gallantry: -
- Rendered safe the torpedo of a burning torpedo aircraft, working 3 feet from the main petrol tank for ten minutes.
- Extinguished a burning aircraft during a heavy bombing attack. Attempted to save a burning aircraft and subsequently removed torpedoes from the vicinity. Assisted in saving the pilot of a burning aircraft and extinguishing the fire. Saved an aircraft from destruction by fire.
- Attempted for six hours to extricate airmen from a bombed shelter, despite continued heavy bombing and danger from falling stonework. Fought fires in two aircraft, his efforts resulting in the saving of one. Freed the parachute of a burning flare caught in an aircraft, enabling the pilot to taxi clear. Checked the fire in a burning aircraft, the greater part of which was undamaged.
- The last three incidents occurred on the same day. Leading Aircraftman Osborne was unfortunately killed on 2 April 1942. During an intense air attack, he led a party to extinguish the flames of a burning aircraft. A petrol tank exploded and he was injured and affected by the fumes. In recovery, he returned to fight the fire and was killed by the explosion of an air vessel while attempting to pour water over torpedoes which were in danger of exploding.
- This airman's fearless courage and great leadership on all occasions have been beyond praise. The Air Officer Commanding, Royal Air Force Mediterranean, has stated that he was "one of the bravest airmen it has been my privilege to meet ".

— London Gazette

Osborne is buried at the Capuccini Naval Cemetery in Kalkara, Malta.
