= Tom Neil =

British flying ace (1920–2018)

Thomas Francis Neil
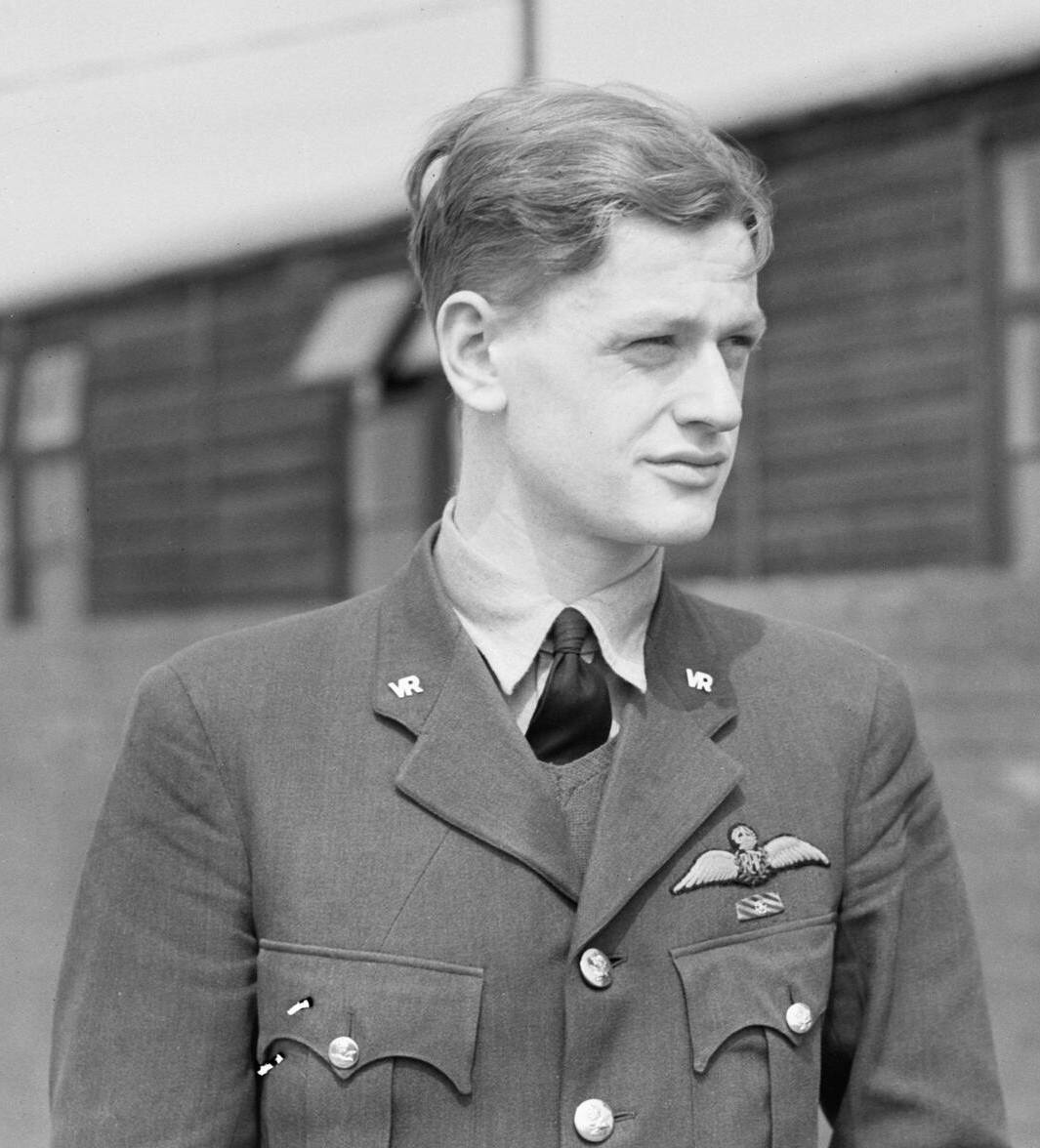
- Neil in 1941
- Born: 14 July 1920; Bootle, England
- Died: 11 July 2018 (aged 97)
- Burial place: St Andrew's Church, Framlingham Pigot
- Military career
- Allegiance: United Kingdom
- Branch: Royal Air Force
- Service years: 1938–1964
- Rank: Wing Commander
- Nickname: Ginger
- Unit: No. 249 Squadron
- Commands: No. 41 Squadron; No. 208 Squadron
- Conflicts: Second World War: Battle of Britain; Battle of Malta; Invasion of Europe
- Awards: Distinguished Flying Cross & Bar; Air Force Cross; Air Efficiency Award; Bronze Star Medal (United States); Legion of Honour (France)

Thomas Francis "Ginger" Neil, DFC & Bar, AFC, AE (14 July 1920 – 11 July 2018) was a British aviator, fighter pilot and flying ace in the Royal Air Force. Neil flew during the Battle of Britain, and shot down 14 enemy aircraft during the Second World War.

== Early life ==
Neil was born in Bootle, England, on 14 July 1920. He had a keen interest in aircraft as a child and also played cricket and football for local teams. His family moved to Manchester when he was 16, and he attended Eccles Secondary (grammar) School where he was awarded an art prize for a drawing of an aeroplane. After taking the School Certificate in 1937 he started work at the District Bank in Gorton while training to be a pilot with the Royal Air Force Volunteer Reserve (RAFVR). Neil had wanted to attend the Royal Air Force College Cranwell but his parents did not approve of his plan.

== RAF career ==
Neil joined the RAFVR on 17 October 1938 at the age of 18 and was called up to full-time service at the outbreak of the Second World War. He was posted to No. 8 Flying Training School on 1 December 1939 and was commissioned as a pilot officer on completion of the course. He was posted on 15 May 1940 to No. 249 Squadron RAF, which was an operational fighter squadron based at RAF Church Fenton in which he flew Hurricanes from RAF North Weald during the Battle of Britain alongside Tich Palliser. Neil recalled that the 12 Hurricanes in the squadron were permanently ready to scramble and that the pilots were simply instructed to shoot down as many enemy aircraft as possible and avoid getting shot themselves. The enemy aircraft he destroyed with the squadron included six Messerschmitt Bf 109s, two Heinkel He 111s, a Messerschmitt Bf 110, a Junkers Ju 87, a Junkers Ju 88 and a Dornier Do 17.

Neil flew 141 combat missions during the Battle of Britain but his only serious mishap was on 7 November 1940 when he had a mid-air collision with another Hurricane and lost the rear section of his aircraft. This rendered it uncontrollable, but he managed to bail out and survived with a minor leg injury. Asked in an interview how he survived so many missions virtually unscathed, he said that in addition to being very lucky and spending a lot of time ducking and weaving, it is important in aerial combat to have the sensitivity to know instinctively what is around you and he was lucky to have that ability.

The apprehensions were before the event. We would see the German planes on the radar and that period used to be rather, shall we say, worry-making. As soon as you got airborne everything was easy because you’re so busy dealing with it.

— Neil on aerial combat.

Neil was awarded the Distinguished Flying Cross on 8 October 1940 and was awarded a Bar to the award on 26 November 1940. He embarked with No. 249 Squadron on HMS Furious on 10 May 1941 and sailed for Gibraltar, and on arrival the squadron transferred to Ark Royal. The squadron flew to Ta' Qali on 21 May to take part in the Battle of Malta and he shot down a Macchi C.200 fighter on 12 June 1941.

On 26 December 1941 Neil left Malta and in 1942 he became tactics officer for No. 81 Group, then he served with No. 56 Operational Training Unit and was officer commanding No. 41 Squadron. He then became liaison officer to the US 9th Air Force's 100th Fighter Wing. This posting led to the award of the Bronze Star Medal. He was awarded the Air Force Cross in the 1950s and retired from the RAF with the rank of wing commander in 1964.

== Business career and later life ==
After retiring from the RAF, Neil returned to the United States to lead a British consultancy company in Boston. He returned to Great Britain in 1967, settling in Norfolk where he became a director in the shoe industry, and later became secretary of his local Chamber of commerce. He retired in the early 1980s.

Neil died on 11 July 2018 aged 97.

== Publications ==
Neil wrote a number of books on his experiences:

- From the Cockpit: Spitfire (Ian Allan Publishing, 1990)
- Onward to Malta: Memoirs of a Hurricane Pilot in Malta, 1941 (Airlife Publications, 1992)
- Flight into Darkness (Air Research Publications, 2006)
- Questions of Guilt and Other Stories: The Stories of Wing Commander Tom Neil (Red Kite Publications, 2008)
- Gun Button to Fire: A Hurricane Pilot's Dramatic Story of the Battle of Britain (Amberley Publishing, 2010)
- The Silver Spitfire: The Story of his own Personal Aircraft (W&N, 2013)
- Portrait of an Airman: A Dramatic Story of Love, Courage, and Sacrifice amid the Tumult and Trauma of War (Red Kite Publications, 2015)
- Jonathan Kerr: A Story of Heroism, Tragedy, Friendship, and Ambition Inspired (2015)
- Scramble!: The Dramatic Story of a Young Fighter Pilot's Experiences During the Battle of Britain & the Siege of Malta (Amberley Publishing, 2015)
- Acts of Fate (Red Kite Publications, 2017)

== Battle of Britain 75th anniversary ==
Neil took part in the commemoration of the 75th anniversary of the Battle of Britain in which he took to the skies in the largest formation of Spitfires and Hurricanes seen in British skies since the Second World War. The formation consisted of 40 aircraft and flew a route around southern England in the areas which saw the most aerial activity during the war.
