= No. 249 Squadron RAF =

No. 249 (Gold Coast) Squadron RAF
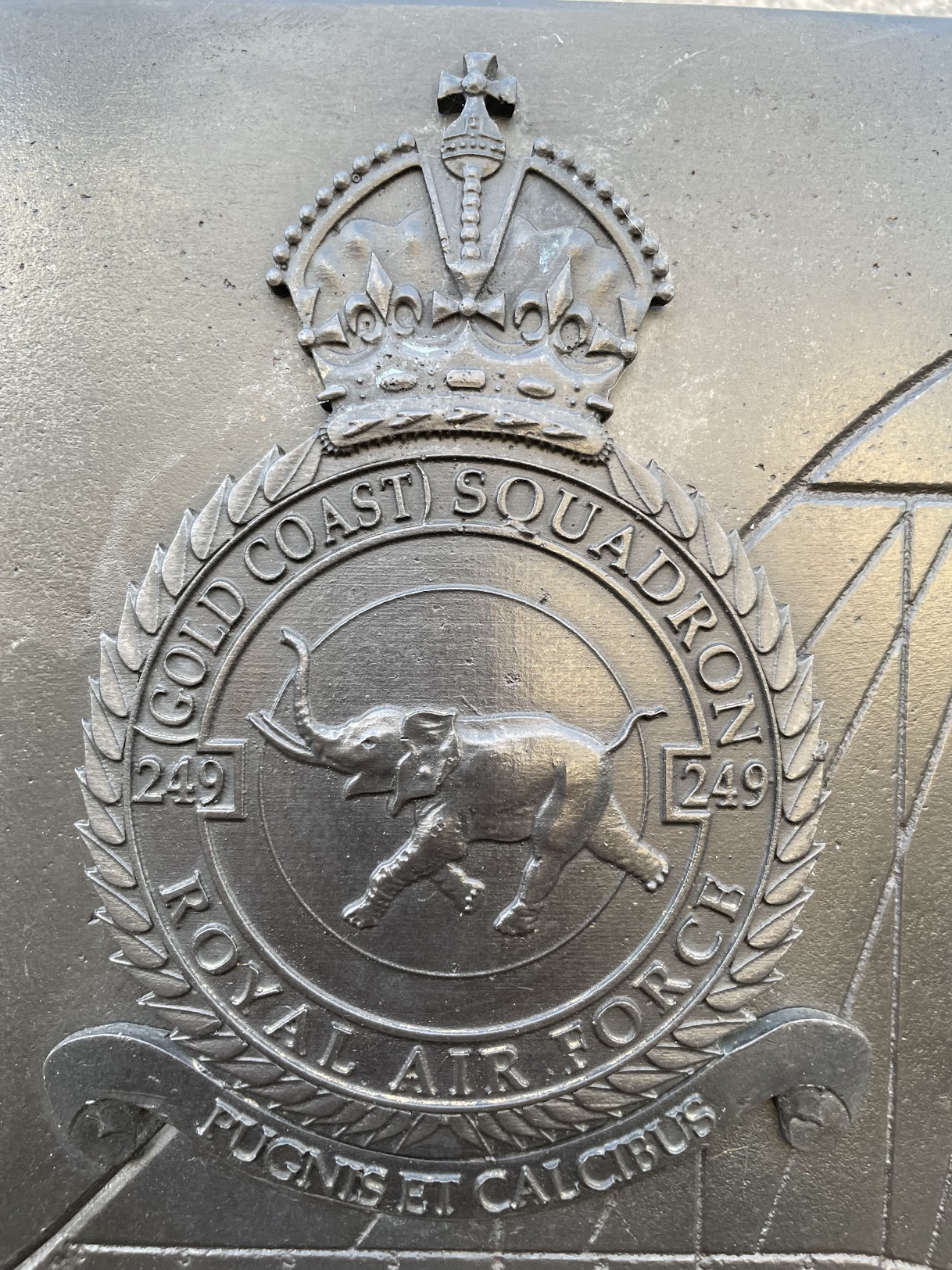
- The heraldic badge of the squadron as it appears on the Battle of Britain Monument in London.
- Active: 18 August 1918 – 8 October 1919; 16 May 1940 – 16 August 1945; 23 October 1945 – 24 February 1969
- Country: United Kingdom
- Branch: Royal Air Force
- Nickname: Gold Coast
- Mottos: Latin: Pugnis et calcibus ("With fists and heels")
- Battle honours: Home Waters, 1918*; Battle of Britain, 1940*; Home Defence; Fortress Europe, 1941*; Malta, 1941–42*; Mediterranean, 1942–43*; North Africa, 1942*; Sicily; Italy, 1943–45*; South-East Europe, 1943–45*; Honours marked with an asterisk* are those emblazoned on the Squadron Standard

Commanders
- Notable commanders: Stan Turner; Percy Lucas

Insignia
- Squadron Badge: In front of a bezant an elephant passant
- Squadron Codes: GN (May 1940 – May 1941, Jun 1943 – Sep 1944, Oct 1945 – Mar 1950); T (Mar 1942 – Jun 1943)

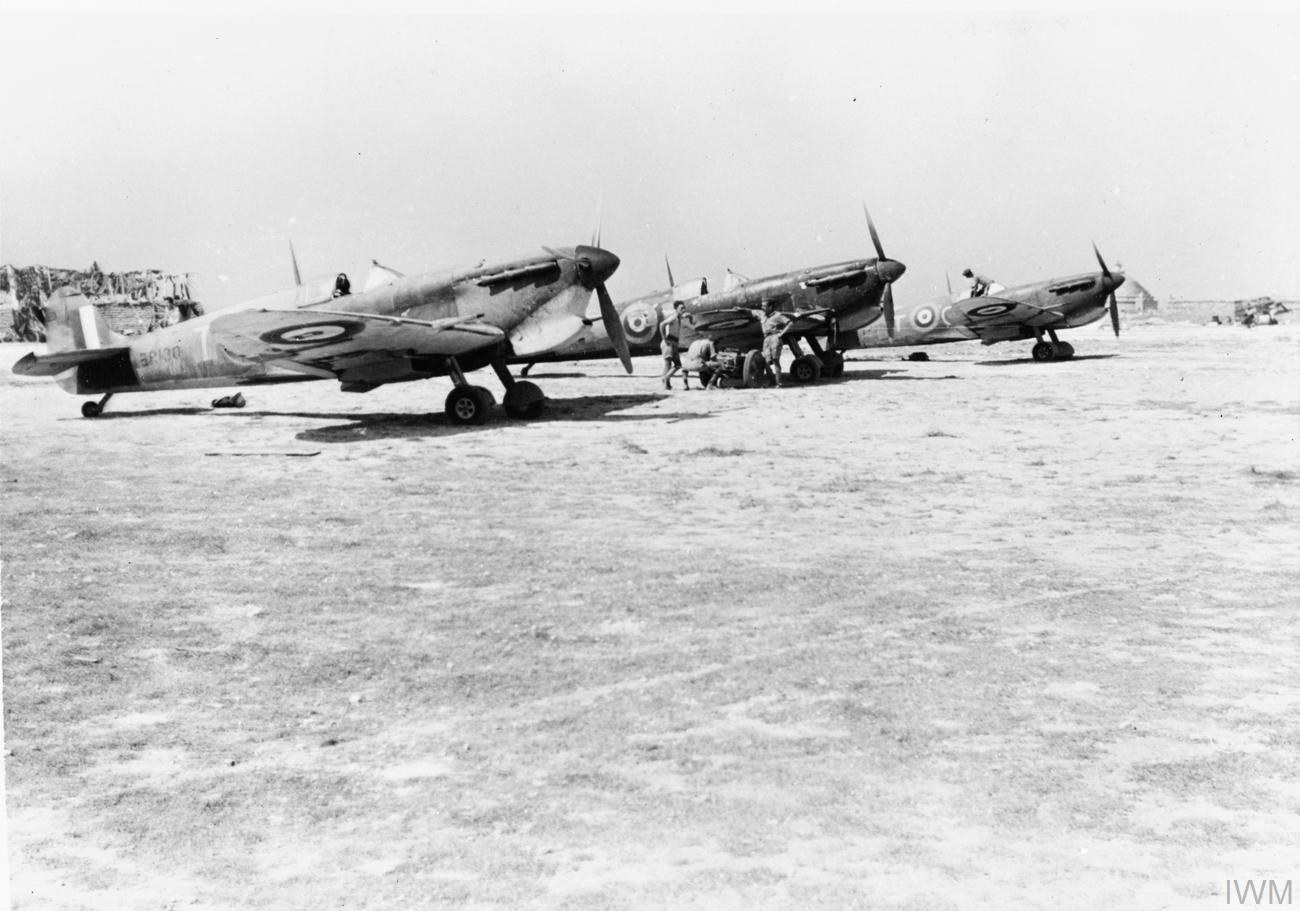
Spitfires 249 Sqn at RAF Ta Kali 1942

No. 249 (Gold Coast) Squadron RAF was a Royal Air Force squadron, active in the sea-patrol, fighter and bomber roles during its existence. It was one of the top scoring fighter squadrons of the RAF in World War II.

== History ==
=== First formation ===
No. 249 Squadron was formed for the first time on 18 August 1918 from Nos. 400, 401, 419 and 450 flights at Dundee. Equipped with a variety of seaplanes the squadron flew coastal patrol and anti-submarine duties as part of No. 78 Wing RAF. It remained at Dundee until April 1919 when it moved to RNAS Killingholme, without its aircraft. The squadron was disbanded not long after, on 8 October 1919.

=== During World War II ===
On 16 May 1940, No. 249 Squadron reformed as a fighter squadron at RAF Church Fenton. Equipped with Hurricanes, the unit fought in the Battle of Britain. The only Victoria Cross awarded to an RAF Fighter Command pilot during the Battle of Britain, was won by James Brindley Nicolson while serving with the squadron. Offensive missions over France began in December 1940 but in May 1941, No. 249 was transferred to Malta by aircraft carrier. There it formed part of the fighter defences, converting to Spitfires in February 1942. Fighter bomber missions over Sicily began in November 1942 and in October 1943 the squadron moved to Italy. Sweeps were carried out over Albania and Yugoslavia and in September 1944, No. 249 converted to Mustangs. In April 1945, it moved to Northern Yugoslavia for a month and after a short period in northern Italy the squadron disbanded on 16 August 1945.

On 23 October 1945, No. 500 Squadron at Eastleigh in Kenya was renumbered No. 249 Squadron and flew Baltimores for a short time before re-equipping with Mosquitoes in February 1946. After taking part in survey flights, the squadron moved to Iraq in June 1946 and became a Tempest fighter squadron.

=== Into the jet age ===
The squadron was stationed at RAF Deversoir in the Egyptian Canal Zone in 1952, flying Vampires. Vampires were received in 1950 and after a period in Egypt the squadron moved to Jordan and converted to Venoms. In August 1956, it moved to Cyprus and in July 1957 to Kenya where it disbanded on 15 October 1957. It reformed at Akrotiri on the same day as a Canberra light bomber unit and after twelve years in the area No.249 disbanded on 24 February 1969.

=== Affiliation ===
The Squadron shares its number with an RAF Air Cadet Squadron (204 (Hailsham) Sqn ATC) based in Hailsham, England. This link is pertinent as 249 Sqn RAF lost a man over the town during the Battle of Britain. The Air Cadets Squadron is also an affiliated member of 249 Squadron Association.

== Commemoration ==
A Battle of Britain Class steam locomotive, Number 34073, 249 Squadron, was named after the squadron. The locomotive escaped scrapping after it was withdrawn from service in 1964 and is currently awaiting restoration to running condition. In 2014 the locomotive was moved from Bury to storage at Carnforth.

A replica Hurricane was unveiled in 2012 in Alexandra Gardens, Barry Avenue, Windsor SL4 3HD. It bears the code letters GN-J of 249 Squadron.

== Noted squadron members ==
- Sqn Ldr George Barclay DFC
- Sqn Ldr Robert Barton OBE, DFC and bar
- Wg Cdr John "Beazle" Beazley DFC
- Flt Lt George "Buzz" Beurling DSO DFC DFM*
- Flt Lt Raoul Daddo-Langlois
- Sqn Leader A G Lewis DFC and bar
- Wg Cdr Percy "Laddie" Lucas CBE DSO DFC
- Flt Lt Norman Macqueen DFC
- Sqn Ldr Robert "Buck" McNair DSO DFC**
- Sqn Ldr Edward Mortimer-Rose DFC*
- Wg Cdr Tom "Ginger" Neil DFC* AFC AE
- Wg Cdr Eric Nicolson VC DFC
- Flt Lt "Titch" Palliser DFC AE
- Flt Lt Jack Rae DFC*
- Gp Cpt Stan Turner DSO DFC*

== Aircraft operated ==
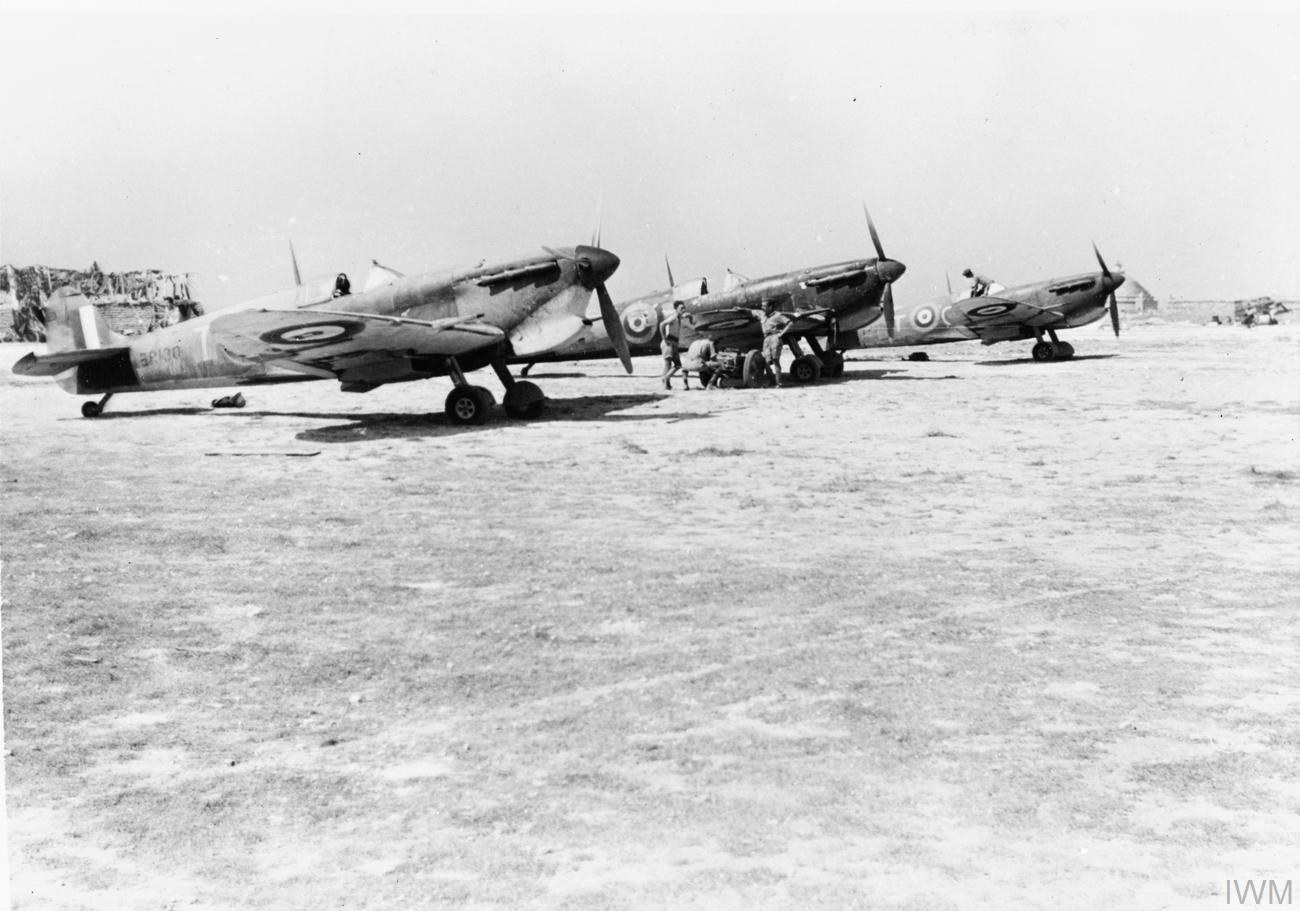
249 Sqn Spitfire Vc (trop) at RAF Ta Kali, Malta, in 1942.

Aircraft operated
From	To	Aircraft	Version
Aug 1918	Mar 1919	Short 184	
Aug 1918	Nov 1918	Sopwith Baby, Fairey Hamble Baby	
Aug 1918	Mar 1919	Curtiss H.12B	
Aug 1918	Mar 1919	Felixstowe F.2a, Felixstowe F.3, Felixstowe F.5	
May 1940	Jun 1940	Supermarine Spitfire	Mk.I
Jun 1940	Feb 1941	Hawker Hurricane	Mk.I
Feb 1941	Mar 1942	Hawker Hurricane	Mks.IIa, IIb
May 1941	Aug 1941	Hawker Hurricane	Mk.I
Feb 1942	Sep 1944	Supermarine Spitfire	Mks.Vb, Vc
Jun 1943	Nov 1943	Supermarine Spitfire	Mk.IX
Sep 1944	Apr 1945	North American Mustang	Mk.III
Apr 1945	Jun 1945	Supermarine Spitfire	Mk.IX
May 1945	Jun 1945	North American Mustang	Mk.III
Jun 1945	Aug 1945	North American Mustang	Mk.IV
Oct 1945	Apr 1946	Martin Baltimore	Mks.IV, V
Mar 1946	Aug 1946	de Havilland Mosquito	FB.26
Dec 1946	Mar 1950	Hawker Tempest	F.6
Feb 1950	May 1952	de Havilland Vampire	FB.5
Jan 1952	Apr 1955	de Havilland Vampire	FB.9
Oct 1954	Dec 1955	de Havilland Venom	FB.1
Jul 1955	Oct 1957	de Havilland Venom	FB.4
Oct 1957	Jan 1960	English Electric Canberra	B.2
Nov 1959	Oct 1961	English Electric Canberra	B.6
Oct 1961	Feb 1969	English Electric Canberra	B.16
