= George Barclay (RAF officer) =

British World War II flying ace

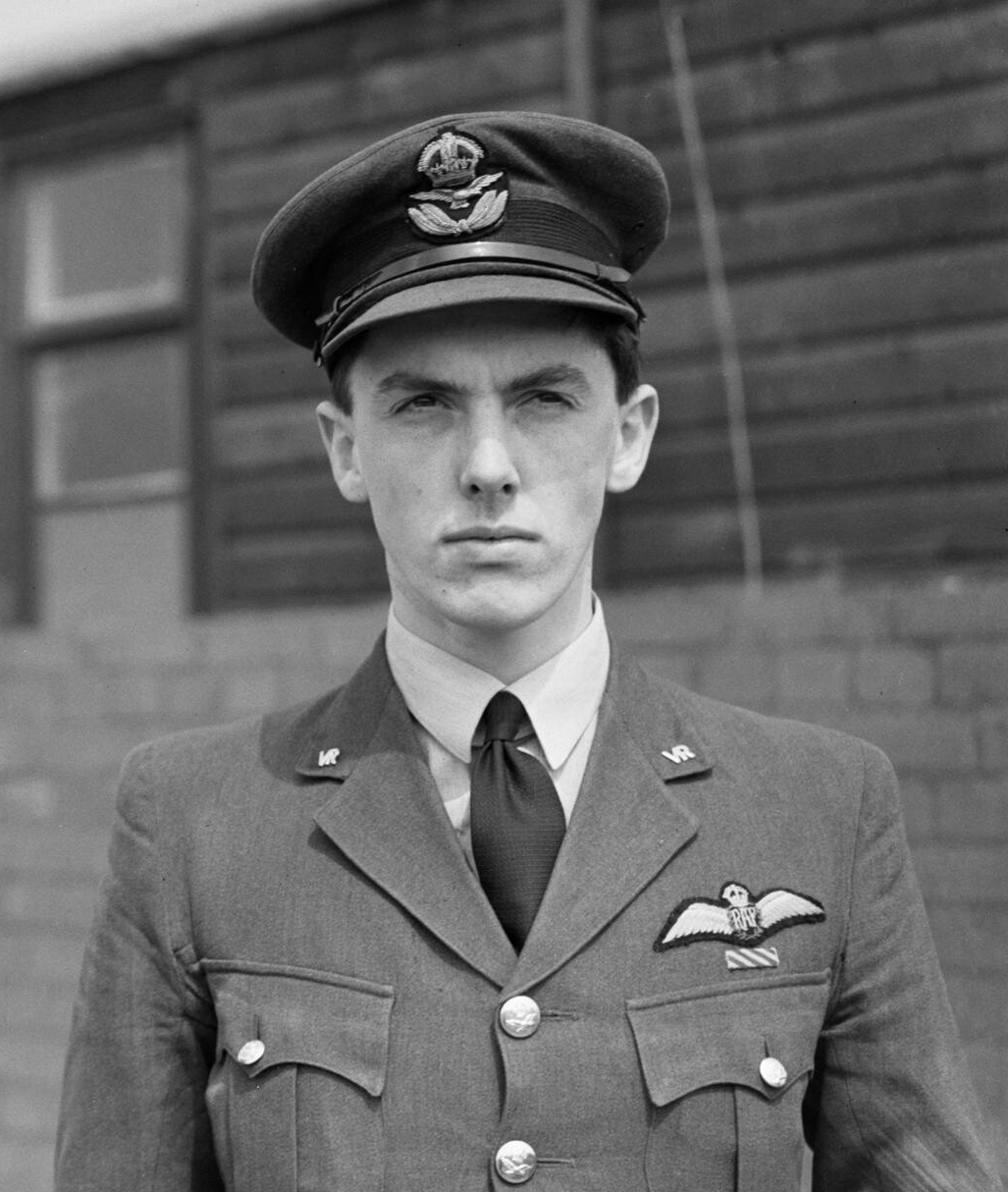
- Barclay in 1941
- Born: 7 December 1919; South London, England
- Died: 17 July 1942 (aged 22); El Alamein, Egypt
- Burial place: El Alamein War Cemetery, Egypt
- Military career
- Allegiance: United Kingdom
- Branch: Royal Air Force
- Service years: 1939–1942
- Rank: Squadron Leader
- Units: No. 249 Squadron; No. 611 Squadron
- Commands: No. 238 Squadron
- Conflicts: Second World War: Battle of Britain; Circus offensive; Western Desert campaign; First Battle of El Alamein †
- Awards: Distinguished Flying Cross

Richard George Arthur Barclay, DFC (7 December 1919 – 17 July 1942) was a Royal Air Force fighter pilot and flying ace of the Second World War. He is credited with destroying at least eight aircraft.

From Upper Norwood, Barclay was a member of the Royal Air Force Volunteer Reserve when he was called up to serve in the RAF on the outbreak of the Second World War. He volunteered to be posted to Fighter Command and once his training was completed in July 1940 he was posted to No. 249 Squadron. He flew during the Battle of Britain, claiming a number of aerial victories before being wounded shortly after the end of the battle. He later served with No. 611 Squadron during the Circus offensive of 1941 and was shot down over France in September of that year. He was able to evade capture and eventually returned to the United Kingdom. He was posted to Egypt in early July 1942 as commander of No. 238 Squadron. He was killed in action later that month during the First Battle of El Alamein

== Early life ==
Richard George Arthur Barclay was born in Upper Norwood, in South London, England, on 7 December 1919; his father Gilbert was an Anglican rector, and his mother Dorothy was the daughter of missionary Charles Studd. His family home for most of his childhood was in the rectory at Great Holland, on the Essex coast. He attended Stowe School and then proceeded to Trinity College, Cambridge, to study economics and law. He joined the University Air Squadron in 1938 and enlisted in the Royal Air Force Volunteer Reserve the following year.

== Second World War ==
Called up for service with the Royal Air Force (RAF) on the outbreak of war, Barclay entered No. 3 Initial Training Wing at Hastings before commencing flight training at Cranwell in early January 1940. Once this phase of training was completed five months later he went to No. 1 School of Army Co-operation at Old Sarum. Shortly afterwards he volunteered for Fighter Command and, after completing a course on Hawker Hurricane fighters at No. 5 Operational Training Unit at Aston Down, he was posted to No. 249 Squadron in July. Based at Leconfield, the squadron had only just become operational with Hurricanes and the following month it moved south to Boscombe Down.

=== Battle of Britain ===
On 2 September Barclay damaged a Messerschmitt Bf 110 heavy fighter over the Thames Estuary. Five days later he shot down a Messerschmitt Bf 109 fighter to the south of Maidstone. He also damaged two Luftwaffe medium bombers. On 15 September, now known as Battle of Britain Day, Barclay destroyed one Dornier Do 17 medium bomber over the Thames and damaged a second. He also probably destroyed two other Do 17s. A Heinkel He 111 medium bomber was probably destroyed by Barclay near Deal on 18 September and the next day he shared in the shooting down of a Junkers Ju 88 medium bomber. By this time, the squadron was operating from North Weald and Barclay's diary records that he could see his house while flying from the airfield. He destroyed a Bf 109 near Ashford on 27 September and also shot down a Ju 88 the same day. His Hurricane was damaged in the latter engagement necessitating Barclay making an emergency landing at West Malling. He was promoted to flying officer on 3 October.

Barclay was credited with the probable destruction of a Bf 109 near Folkestone on 14 October but by this time, the pace of operations was on the decline and the squadron was engaged in convoy patrols. On 14 November he engaged and probably destroyed a pair of Bf 109s near the mouth of the Thames Estuary. His final aerial victory of the year was a share in the destruction of a Bf 109 to the east of Manston on 14 November. In recognition of his successes, he was awarded the Distinguished Flying Cross. The citation, published on 26 November, read:

This officer has shown admirable coolness and courage in combat against the enemy. His keenness and determination have enabled him to destroy at least four of their aircraft.

— London Gazette, No. 35001, 26 November 1940

On 29 November, Barclay was wounded during an engagement with a Bf 109. As a result, he received hospital treatment for several weeks and did not return to operations until March 1941.

=== Circus offensive ===
By this time No. 249 Squadron was conducting offensive operations to German-occupied Europe as part of the RAF's Circus offensive. After two months, Barclay was posted to No. 52 OTU, at Debden, as an instructor. In August he returned to operations with a posting to No. 611 Squadron as a flight commander. Equipped with Supermarine Spitfire fighters and based at Hornchurch, it flew sorties to occupied France. During an engagement over Saint-Omer on 20 September, Barclay's Spitfire was damaged by gun fire by Bf 109s and he had to make a crash landing at Buyschoeure. With help from the French Resistance, he was able to evade capture and make his way to Spain. He was repatriated to the United Kingdom in December by way of Gibraltar. By the time of his return he had been promoted to flight lieutenant.

=== Western Desert ===
Rather than returning to operations, Barclay was assigned to staff duties. He served briefly at the headquarters of Fighter Command before being posted, in February 1942, to No. 9 Group headquarters as a tactics officer. In April he was promoted to squadron leader and given command of No. 601 Squadron. The squadron was preparing for a move overseas and on 10 April its groundcrew, together with Barclay, embarked the RMS Rangitata at Liverpool, destined for Egypt. They arrived there on 23 June to await the flying personnel and their Spitfires. However at that time Squadron Leader John Bisdee took command.

At the start of July Barclay was posted to the Western Desert as commander of No. 238 Squadron, flying Hurricane Mk IIs from Landing Ground 92 in Egypt. On 16 July he shot down a Bf 109. The next day, 17 July, he destroyed a Junkers Ju 87 dive bomber. On a subsequent sortie patrolling over the El Alamein battlefield a few hours later he was shot down and killed by Werner Schröer of Jagdgeschwader 27 (Fighter Wing 27). At the time of his death, he was credited with having shot down eight aircraft, two of which being shared with other pilots, and damaging four others. He is also credited with the probable destruction of six aircraft. He is buried at the El Alamein War Cemetery, Egypt.

Barclay's older brother Charles, an army officer, was killed in 1944. A memorial to both brothers is in Cromer Parish Church, where their father was vicar at the time of their deaths. Barclay's diaries, written during his wartime career up until his death, were published in the 1970s and gave a rare, descriptive and highly articulate first hand account of the life of a fighter pilot during 1940 to 1941. An expanded edition was published in 2012.
