= Norman Macqueen =

British flying ace of the Second World War

- Born: 1920; West Midlands, United Kingdom
- Died: 4 May 1942 (aged 22); Malta
- Burial place: Kalkara Naval Cemetery, Malta
- Military career
- Allegiance: United Kingdom
- Branch: Royal Air Force
- Rank: Flight Lieutenant
- Units: No. 610 Squadron (1940); No. 602 Squadron (1940–1941); No. 249 Squadron (1942)
- Conflicts: Second World War: Circus offensive; Siege of Malta
- Awards: Distinguished Flying Cross

Norman Macqueen DFC (1920 – 4 May 1942) was a British flying ace of the Royal Air Force (RAF) during the Second World War. He was credited with at least nine aerial victories.

Originally from the West Midlands, Macqueen joined the RAF on the outbreak of the Second World War. He completed his training in October 1940 and spent the following year serving with No. 602 Squadron as it participated in the RAF's Circus offensive. In late January 1942 he was posted to Malta to serve in the island's aerial defences. After ferrying a Supermarine Spitfire fighter to Malta from the aircraft aircraft carrier HMS Eagle on 7 March, Macqueen was posted to No. 249 Squadron. Over the next two months he claimed several aerial victories and was awarded the Distinguished Flying Cross. He was killed on 4 May, aged 22, as a result of an engagement with a German fighter over Malta.

== Early life ==
Norman Carter Macqueen was born in 1920 in the West Midlands of the United Kingdom. His father was a doctor and when Macqueen was still a child, moved the family to the Welsh town of Rhyl. Macqueen was educated locally at Southlawn School but then went to Fettes College in Edinburgh for further schooling.

== Second World War ==
On the outbreak of the Second World War in September 1939 Macqueen enlisted in the Royal Air Force (RAF). When his flight training was completed he was commissioned as a pilot officer and posted to No. 610 Squadron. This was based at Acklington after being extensively engaged in the Battle of Britain, and it was tasked with the aerial defence of the northeast of England with its Supermarine Spitfire fighters.

In December Macqueen was transferred to No. 602 Squadron. This was based at Prestwick and, like Macqueen's previous unit, on a rest period after its involvement in the Battle of Britain. In the summer of 1941, the squadron moved to Kenley where it joined the Australian No. 452 Squadron and the New Zealand No. 485 Squadron as part of the fighter wing based there. It regularly flew sorties with its Spitfires to German-occupied Europe as part of the RAF's Circus offensive. On one of these, carried out on 21 September, he damaged a Messerschmitt Bf 109 fighter over Hardelot. The following month he was promoted to flying officer.

=== Siege of Malta ===
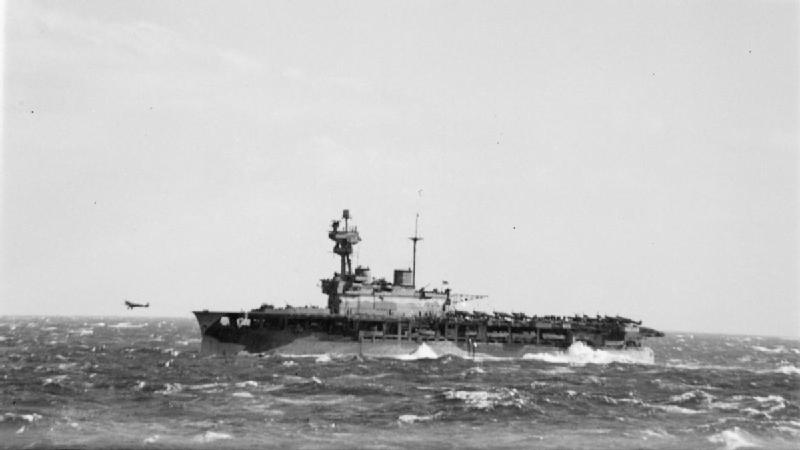
A Supermarine Spitfire fighter being flown off the flight deck of the aircraft carrier HMS Eagle, 1942

In late January 1942, Macqueen, who by this time held the rank of flight lieutenant, was posted to Malta where he would join the island's air defences against incessant Axis attacks. Along with several other pilots, he was dispatched to Gibraltar and then transferred to the aircraft carrier HMS Eagle from which they were to fly Spitfires to Malta. An attempt to fly off the carrier on 26 February had to be cancelled due to malfunctioning long-range fuel tanks but on 7 March he and 14 other pilots took off from the deck of Eagle and flew for 4 hours to the island. The arrival of the Spitfires was a significant boost to Malta's aerial defences, which previously comprised 21 operational Hurricanes.

After landing his Spitfire, Macqueen was posted to No. 249 Squadron. This was commanded by Squadron Leader Stan Turner and operated its Spitfires from Ta Kali, part of Malta's aerial defences against attacking Italian and German bombers. Three days after his arrival on Malta, Macqueen made his first claim, a Junkers Ju 88 medium bomber that he damaged over the island. On 14 March he destroyed a Bf 109 of Jagdgeschwader 53 (JG53) over Gozo, seeing it go down into the sea.

On 18 March, Macqueen was among four pilots scrambled to intercept over twenty bombers. However, they were themselves intercepted by some Bf 109s, and Macqueen's fellow pilots was shot down. He in turn destroyed the Bf 109 he thought responsible. Four days later the squadron carried out a number of sorties to try and protect a shipping convoy approaching Malta. Escorting some torpedo-bombers that were to seek out Italian ships that could attack the convoy, Macqueen destroyed a Bf 109 that tried to disrupt the sortie. The next day, 23 March, he was one of several pilots involved in the interception of some Ju 88s bombing a supply convoy heading for Malta. He had a share in the damaging of three of the bombers. On 30 March he damaged another Ju 88.

On 4 April Macqueen was credited with the destruction of a Ju 88 of Kampfgeschwader 77. He had damaged it so badly that it crashed on landing at Comiso. He shot down another Ju 88 on 10 April, the wreckage of which landed on the airfield at Ta Kali. He shared in the destruction of one Bf 109 and damaging of a second on 14 April. He shot down a Ju 88 to the north of Ta Kali on 20 April. The next day he destroyed a Bf 109 near Filfla. He also damaged a Ju 88 during the same sortie. On 1 May he shared in the destruction of a Bf 109 of JG53 over Malta. The same day an award of the Distinguished Flying Cross (DFC) for Macqueen was announced. The citation for the DFC, published in The London Gazette, read:

This officer carried out a large number of sorties over enemy-occupied territory and destroyed 1 enemy aircraft whilst based in this country. In the Middle East he has destroyed a further 4 hostile aircraft. Throughout his operational career, Flight Lieutenant MacQueen has rendered most valuable service. He has displayed great skill and leadership.

— The London Gazette, No. 35542, 1 May 1942.

In the afternoon of 4 May Macqueen was one of four pilots scrambled to intercept a group of bombers. However, he was attacked by a Bf 109 and his aircraft was damaged. Although he was able to break away and rejoin his squadron, as he approached Ta Kali his Spitfire suddenly plunged into a dive and crashed. It was speculated by his fellow pilots that he had been wounded at the time of being attacked and had died or lost consciousness as a result of his injuries.

Macqueen, who was aged 22 at the time of his death, is credited with the destruction of nine aircraft, two of which were shared with other pilots. He is also credited with damaging eight aircraft, four being shared with other pilots. He is buried at the Kalkara Naval Cemetery, also known as the Capuccini Naval Cemetery.
