= George Beurling =

Canadian fighter pilot and flying ace

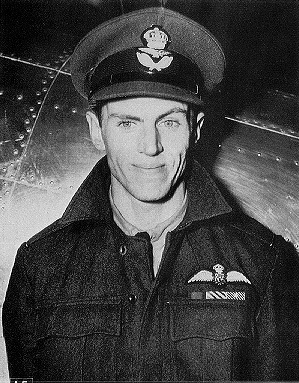
- "Buzz" Beurling in March 1943
- Born: 6 December 1921; Verdun, Quebec, Canada
- Died: 20 May 1948 (aged 26); Rome, Italy
- Military career
- Allegiance: United Kingdom; Canada; Israel
- Branch: Royal Air Force (1940–43); Royal Canadian Air Force (1943–44); Israeli Air Force (1948)
- Service years: 1940–1944, 1948
- Rank: Flight Lieutenant (RCAF)
- Nicknames: "Buzz" "Screwball" "Joe"
- Service number: 128707
- Conflicts: World War II; 1948 Arab–Israeli War †
- Awards: Distinguished Service Order; Distinguished Flying Cross; Distinguished Flying Medal & Bar

George Frederick "Buzz" Beurling, DSO, DFC, DFM & Bar (6 December 1921 – 20 May 1948) was the most successful Canadian fighter pilot and flying ace of the Second World War.

Beurling was recognized as "Canada's most famous hero of the Second World War", as "The Falcon of Malta" and the "Knight of Malta", having been credited with shooting down 27 Axis aircraft in just 14 days over the besieged Mediterranean island. Before the war ended his official total climbed to either 31 or 31 1/3.

Beurling's wartime service was terminated prior to the war's end, for repeated stunting and his lack of teamwork. Having found a way to potentially continue combat flying in the postwar era, Beurling was killed in a crash while attempting to deliver an aircraft to Israel.

== Early life ==
George Beurling was born in 1921 in Verdun (now part of Montreal), Quebec into a religious family and was the third of five children in the family. His father, Frederick Gustav Beurling, was Swedish and a commercial artist working for the Claude Neon Company. His mother, Hetty Florence Gibbs, was of English descent and was born in the Montreal suburb of Pointe-Saint-Charles.

George Beurling began to develop an interest in flying at the age of 6 when his father built him a model aircraft. His parents wanted him to study in McGill University and become a successful commercial artist like his father. At the age of 15, George quit school and took up a job to increase his income. One year later, he had logged 150 flying hours and passed all examinations for a commercial pilot licence.

Wanting to increase his flying experience, he set out for China, hoping to join the Chinese Nationalist Air Force by crossing the US border. He was intending to head to San Francisco and work for some while in China and later sign up for the job. Eventually, he was arrested as an immigrant at the border and was repatriated back home. He first took the controls of an aircraft in 1933, and was flying solo by 1938. He left school to work for an air freight company in Gravenhurst, Ontario, and soon gained a commercial licence. Beurling joined the Royal Air Force (RAF) in September 1940.

== Second World War ==
With the outbreak of war, Beurling tried to join the Royal Canadian Air Force (RCAF), but his lack of academic qualifications led to his rejection. He then tried to join the Finnish Air Force (which was fighting the Soviets in the Winter War), but could not get his parents' permission. Instead, Beurling sailed across the Atlantic on a convoy, landing in Glasgow, intending to enlist in the RAF. Unfortunately, he had forgotten his birth certificate and had to return to Canada. In September 1940, after he had survived the return trip, the RAF accepted him as a pilot.

=== Joining the RAF ===
Having survived one or two aerial misdemeanours, Beurling reached No. 7 Operational Training Unit, at RAF Hawarden, in September 1941. Beurling demonstrated considerable skill in training. In Hawarden, he came under the influence of the great Ginger Lacey, whose score at the time stood at 27. Lacey later commented about Beurling: "There are not two ways about it, he was a wonderful pilot and an even better shot."

These two factors, coupled with exceptional eyesight, were the keys to Beurling's later success. But they did not come without effort. At Hawarden, he immersed himself in gunnery, estimation of range, deflection, bullet trail and bullet drop, until his application of these became automatic. For him, flying and shooting became one single action.

In the middle of December, he was posted as a Sergeant Pilot to 403 Squadron, a RCAF "Article XV squadron", which had just moved to North Weald, Essex. He flew his first (uneventful) combat mission in a Supermarine Spitfire, on the 25th of December, 1941. Beurling remained with 403 for nearly four months, escorting bombers and flying fighter sweeps across the English Channel.

In early 1942, a change of policy by the RCAF required its squadrons to be staffed by RCAF personnel. Because Beurling had remained technically a member of the RAF, he was posted to 41 Squadron RAF in Sussex.

On 1 May 1942, 41 Squadron was placed at a state of 30 minutes readiness from dawn until 09.00 and from 12.30 to participate in a Rodeo 9. Tangmere Wing was airborne from Westhampnett and Merston between 13.05 and 13.10, led by S/Ldr Thomas, and flew to Beachy Head where it rendezvoused with the 10 Group Wing at 10,000 feet at 13.30. Initially, 41 Squadron pilots saw nothing of interest on their patrol, but after they had left the French coast and after orbiting to port once off the coast just after turning home, approximately sixteen Fw 190s were seen.

Sgt George Beurling later reported combat at 14,000 above Cap Gris-Nez: "Squadron orbited left-handing towards the English coast. E/A were reported by their vapour trails at 9 oʼclock. I as [...] blue 4 saw 2 FW diving on the blue 3, I pulled my nose up and fired at E/A on the starboard side and blue 3 could see one on the port side. I was then hit by cannon and machine gun fire from 5 or 6 FW attacking from above and behind". After landing, his machine was so severely damaged by enemy fire that it was delivered to Flying Training School Hucknall, but after inspection recategorized as E and Struck off Charge. Beurling was allegedly not claimed as a kill by the enemy. He continued his Combat Report: "I turned into the[m], seen no evasive action and FW roared overhead heading into [...] also gradually opening out as they did so. I adjusted my sights on the middle one. E/A appeared to jump momentarily and shudder, still nothing happened. My last burst of fire appeared to hit his petrol tank as his wings broke off heading up, also the fuselage breaking between the cockpit and the tail unit. I waited for signs of the pilot out but there was none. (The attack was made line astern very slightly off to the left 5o at the most). Ammo used 60 Rds Cannon, 1210 Rds .303 Browning".

The same repeated itself on 3 May, when he spotted a lone Focke-Wulf Fw 190, and broke from the flight to pursue it. Beurling made a climbing turn to port, following S/Ldr Feeʼs lead. Looking down, he saw an Fw 190 attacking a Spitfire below him, which he believed was 41 Squadronʼs Yellow Section. He half-rolled onto the FWʼs tail, being noticed by the target plane, which broke away and dived steeply for the French coast. Beurling went after it and closed to between 300 and 350 yards, where he opened fire with both cannons and machine guns using 120 cannon shells and 480 MG rounds. Pieces of the Fw 190 dislodged from the starboard side of the fuselage, which was followed by an explosion near the cockpit in a large orange flash. The aircraft then dived vertically in a crash toward the coast, while George remained at 17,000 feet and orbited the area. Beurling then regrouped with friendly aircraft, but as he did not witness its final fate claimed the Fw 190 probably destroyed 2–3 miles (3.2–4.8 km) off Cap Gris Nez at approximately 12:00.

On this occasion, Beurling was reprimanded for attacking a target without permission, and became unpopular with his superiors and fellow pilots. As Red 4, finding himself alone in the sky, he made his way back across the Channel, joining up with Sgt Appleton mid-way. Counting all claims together, after Group revision, 3–1–2 Fw 190s were credited to the RAF FC pilots. These claims are disputed.

When another pilot was posted overseas, Beurling offered to take his place. Ordered to board a ship, he did not know his destination until the vessel reached Gibraltar. He was destined for No. 249 Squadron RAF, at Malta.

=== Malta (1942) ===
Quotes on Beurling in Malta

He fired only when he thought he could destroy. Two hundred and fifty yards was the distance from which he liked best to fire. A couple of short, hard burst from there and that was usually it. He picked his targets off cleanly and decisively, swinging his sight smoothly through them as a first-class shot strokes driven partridges out of the sky. It was a fluent and calculated exercise... For Beurling the confirmed kill was the thing.

Nine of his kills on Malta were Italian pilots. About them he used to say: "The Jerrie are probably better over-all pilots than the Italians, but they certainly let the Eyeties do their fighting for them when the going got tough. When we get around to adding the final score for this show I hope somebody thinks of that".

On 6 July, he was flying one of eight Spitfires that were scrambled to intercept three Italian Cant bombers and 30 Macchi 202s, Italy's top-line fighter. The eight Spitfires dived straight into the Italians. In seconds, with one burst Beurling had damaged a bomber. Then, suddenly he was on the tail of a Macchi whose pilot (probably Sergente Maggiore Francesco Pecchiari from 51° Stormo), spotting the Spitfire, plunged into a dive. The Canadian chased his prey for 15,000 feet (4,600 m) and, when the Italian pulled up at 5,000, Beurling let go a two-second burst from 300 yards away. It was a perfect hit. Although he wasn't aware that he had been fired on, when Beurling inspected his Spitfire back at Takali, he found it riddled with bullets. Undaunted, that evening, just before dusk, he was in the air again in a patrol of four Spitfires. Radar had shown two German Junkers Ju 88s and 20 Messerschmitt Bf 109Fs, heading towards Malta. After the four Spitfires dived and split up the formation, Beurling followed a fighter trying to escape at low level over the sea. After he laid down a two-second burst the German crashed into the Mediterranean.

On his last combat mission over Malta, while engaging a third aircraft, another, taking him unawares, drilled his aircraft with cannon shells from behind. Screwball, injured quite severely by shrapnel, bailed out low down. He landed in the sea and got into his dinghy. Malta's air-sea rescue service quickly came to his aid. L.G. Head, a member of the crew of HSL 128 remembered that when they picked him out of the water he was most concerned that he was unable to locate a small bible that he had been given by his mother.

Fighter pilots played a critical role in the defence of Malta during its siege. Beurling landed on the island on 9 June, after having flown off the deck of HMS Eagle aboard his Spitfire, during Operation Salient. His nickname on Malta was "Screwball", an expletive he had a habit of using.

Beurling had a baptism by fire in the mid-morning of 12 June when, flying a Spitfire, with three other pilots from 249, the formation intercepted eight Bf 109s. Beurling claimed to have blown the tail off a Bf 109, but nobody saw it hit the ground, so he was credited with a "damaged". This correction was right, because Jagdwaffe did not suffer any combat loss near Malta on that day, not even a damaged fighter. After that, Beurling claimed a series of kills that had no equal. On 6 July 1942, with other pilots from 249, he attacked a formation of three Cant Z1007bis, 14 Reggiane Re.2001s and more than two dozen Macchi C.202s. He almost certainly shot down Sergente Francesco Pecchiari from 352^{a} Squadriglia. Then he claimed another Macchi that crashed near Zejtun, likely the Reggiane of Sottotenente Romano Pagliani, 152^{a} Squadriglia. During this fight, the Italians claimed two Spitfires, one by Furio Niclot Doglio (whom Beurling killed three weeks later). RAF suffered no losses, but Beurling's aircraft was badly shot up. However he made a third claim that day, a Messerschmitt, hit from a distance of 800 yards. Jagdwaffe suffered one fighter combat casualty on that day. Fw. Anton Engels of 1./JG 77 was allegedly hit by A.A. fire and lost with his Bf 109F-4, W.Nr. 13386, Weiss 4 in the sea near Malta.

On 10 July, Beurling's Malta tally rose to five in just four days, making him an ace. That day, it seems likely that he shot down the C.202 of Sergente Maggiore Francesco Visentini, from 378^{a} Squadriglia.

On 12 July, Beurling, piloting a Spitfire and searching for Pilot Officer Berkeley-Hill, who was missing, spotted, at a lower altitude, Tenente Colonnello Aldo Quarantotti and Tenente Carlo Seganti flying Reggiane Re.2001s, who in turn were looking for Lieutenant Francesco Vichi, who had disappeared while a Spitfire was chasing him. Beurling, with Flying Officer Erik Hetherington, dived on the tail of the second of the two Reggianes and downed Seganti. Then Beurling attacked the other Reggiane. He closed up to 100 feet (30 m) and just when Quarantotti spotted him, Beurling delivered a short burst that decapitated the Italian commander. This aircraft also fell into the sea. Two days later it was the Reggianes who attacked him and badly shot up his Spitfire. Beurling's aircraft was "riddled by better than 20 bullets through the fuselage and wings". "An explosive bullet nicked my right heel", he recalled.

On 22 July, Beurling lost his best friend in Malta, French-Canadian pilot Jean Paradis. The following day, eight 249 Spitfires were scrambled. Beurling claimed to have badly damaged a bomber and, after a long dogfight with a Reggiane, to have "blown his left wing off". The 151^{a} Squadriglia, in fact, lost Sergente Maggiore Bruno Di Pauli. The Macchi 202 pilot reported to have parachuted down after an AA shell had damaged his aircraft and realizing that he was followed by six Spitfires that, at the moment, had still not fired.

Italian ace and record-setting test pilot Furio Niclot Doglio; he was Beurling's 14th kill.

27 July was Beurling's "biggest day on Malta". That day, he shot down Sergente Faliero Gelli, and immediately afterwards, Captain Furio Niclot Doglio, Regia Aeronautica's best fighter ace, (Note: Aged 34, Doglio, a famous pre-war pilot who held seven international flying records, was an ace with seven air victories, six of them Spitfires, shot down in four weeks over Malta.) both flying Macchi MC. 202s. Doglio, who was diving to counterattack the head-on Spitfires of 126 Squadron and had misunderstood the warning waggling of wings of his wingman, Maresciallo Ennio Tarantola (who had seen the oncoming 249 Squadron fighters from left, high above), was Beurling's 14th "kill".

On the same day, Beurling also claimed two Bf 109s, one of which was piloted by the ace Leutnant Karl-Heinz Preu of JG 53 although other sources attribute this to flak. On 24 July 1942, Beurling was awarded the Distinguished Flying Medal, the citation read:

Sergeant Beurling has displayed great skill and courage in the face of the enemy. One day in July 1942, he engaged a number of enemy fighters which were escorting a formation of Junkers 88s and destroyed one fighter. Later during the same day he engaged 10 enemy fighters and shot two of them down into the sea, bringing his total victories to eight.

On 30 July, he was commissioned as a pilot officer, and on 4 September won a bar to his DFM, largely for his exploits on 27 July. The citation read:

Since being awarded the Distinguished Flying Medal in July 1942, Sergeant Beurling has destroyed a further 9 enemy aircraft, bringing his victories to 17. One of his exploits was the destruction of 4 enemy fighters in one day; during these brief combats he also damaged a further 2 hostile aircraft. His courage and determination are a source of inspiration to all.

The enervation of daily combat combined with the effects of the poor rations and dysentery were telling. Beurling was bedridden for much of August and September, gaining only 1½ victories in August. On 8 August, while he was shooting at a Bf 109, he was jumped by two more. He hit one and it went straight into the sea: this was confirmed by his section leader. But his aircraft was then hit in the engine and he belly-landed in a stone-walled field. "I climbed out", he recalled, "unhurt except for a superficial cut in one arm." Beurling was shot down either by Herbert Rollwage or Siegfried Freytag and Fw Pohl of I./Jagdgeschwader 77 (JG 77—77th Fighter Wing), who all claimed a Spitfire shot down.

Beurling hitched back to Ta' Qali Field. On 25 September, he had another successful day, claiming to have downed three German fighters, but on this occasion his victories seem to be "overclaimed". That day, flying with 11 other Spitfires, he met a dozen Bf 109s 30 miles northeast of Zonqor Point. He claimed to have "disintegrated" a first Bf 109, to have damaged a second and set a third on fire, that "enveloped in flames, dived vertically striking the sea", the pilot bailing out. Two of these victims were two German fighters that came back to base, even if badly damaged and the third could be the one piloted by Kurt Gorbing, who made a forced-landing and died shortly afterwards.

On 10 October, Beurling was testing his newly serviced Spitfire when he was vectored to intercept two Bf 109s, flying line abreast at 1,000 feet (300 m) over Filfla. He reported to have hit "the starboard fellow" in the engine: "He pancaked right smack down on his belly and flipped over onto his back." The second BF 109 tried to fly away but he hit the fuel tank: "The ship blew up, complete with pilot." Those kills brought Beurling's Malta tally to 21, plus another shared with two others. But there is no record of a Messerschmitt crashing on the island on 10 October 1942, nor any German losses. On the morning of 13 October, 3 miles (4.8 km) north of St Paul's Bay, Beurling, attacked a formation of Junkers Ju 88s, escorted by 30 Bf 109s. He claimed to have at first hit a bomber, then an oncoming Bf 109 that burst into flames. Seconds later, he shot at a second Bf 109, without observing strikes, "but pilot bailed out". On 16 October he was awarded the Distinguished Flying Cross, the citation read:

Pilot Officer George Frederick BEURLING, D.F.M. (128707) Royal Air Force Volunteer Reserve, No. 249 Squadron. Since being awarded a Bar to the Distinguished Flying Medal, this officer has shot down a further 3 hostile aircraft, bringing his total victories to 20. One day in September 1942, he and another pilot engaged 4 enemy fighters. In the ensuing combat, Pilot Officer Beurling destroyed 2 of them. As a relentless fighter, whose determination and will to win has won the admiration of his colleagues, this officer has set an example in keeping with the highest traditions of the Royal Air Force.

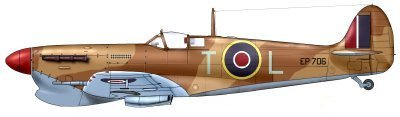
Beurling's Spitfire VC in which he scored most of his victories in Malta

Beurling was a committed Christian and non-smoker. He dedicated himself totally to the art of aerial combat. Tending to be a loner on the ground and in the air, Beurling angered his commanders with his disdain for teamwork. His relentless concentration on aerial fighting led Beurling to develop a marked skill at deflection shooting and together with his situational awareness, he was soon recognised as a deadly fighter pilot. Like many successful Spitfire pilots, Beurling developed the habit of only engaging enemy aircraft at 250 yards (230 m) or less – a range at which many other pilots would be breaking away. Beurling owed his success to remarkably good eyesight and the ability to "toss his Spitfire" into violent combat manoeuvres. If jumped from behind, he would pull back on the stick of his Mk Vc Spitfire so hard that the aircraft would enter a violent stall, flick over and spin. This was a hard, sudden and very dangerous act for the enemy fighter on his tail to follow. Beurling would also ram both ailerons and rudder into a sudden and violent turn, causing his Spitfire to flip over and drop. This manoeuvre was notably difficult and risky, although Beurling used it habitually.

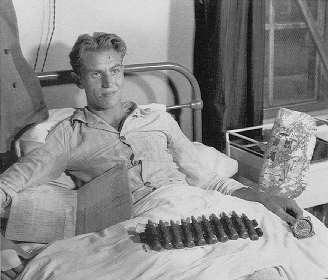
Beurling in hospital after his transport aircraft crashed

Beurling was shot down four times over Malta. On 14 October 1942 (his last flight over Malta), Beurling scrambled with six other pilots from his squadron to intercept a raid of Ju 88s escorted by 60 Bf 109s, Macchi 202s and Reggiane 2001s just south of Zonqor Point. He strafed a bomber that he claimed to have shot down, but was, in turn, hit by return fire from the Ju 88: "I picked up about 30 bullet holes." Then he claimed to have damaged a Messerschmitt and to have blown the left wing of another Bf 109 off at the root. Seconds later, another German fighter hit him from below. He was wounded in the heel, elbow and ribs, and his Spitfire was set on fire. He managed to bail out into the sea. During this action, no Messerschmitt was in fact destroyed. Only 2. Staffel (Black 1/7619) of I/JG53, flown by Obfw Josef Edere who was wounded, was damaged in the action, and Edere crash-landed at San Pietro, Sicily. Beurling was probably shot down by Obfw Riker of 4/JG53 or Ltn Karl von Lieres of 2/JG27 (who was credited with his 26th). Of the seven Ju 88s claimed to have been shot down by the RAF, only one did not return. After his rescue, Beurling was hospitalised.

Beurling was then sent back to Britain on 31 October 1942. On the way, the B-24 transport aircraft he was aboard crashed into the sea off Gibraltar. Beurling was one of only three survivors.

On 4 November he received the Distinguished Service Order, the citation read:

Pilot Officer George Frederick BEURLING, D.F.C., D.F.M. (128707), Royal Air Force Volunteer Reserve, No. 249 Squadron. Since being awarded the Distinguished Flying Cross, Pilot Officer Beurling has destroyed a further six enemy aircraft, bringing his total victories to 28. During one sortie on 13 October 1942, he shot down a Junkers 88 and two Messerschmitt 109s. The following day, in a head-on attack on enemy bombers, he destroyed one of them before he observed his leader being attacked by an enemy fighter. Although wounded, Pilot Officer Beurling destroyed the fighter. Then climbing again, although his aircraft was hit by enemy fire, he shot down another fighter before his own aircraft was so damaged that he was forced to abandon it. He descended safely on to the sea and was rescued. This officer's skill and daring are unexcelled.

Over Malta, he had claimed over 27 kills, by far the highest total by an RAF pilot during the campaign.

=== War bond drive ===
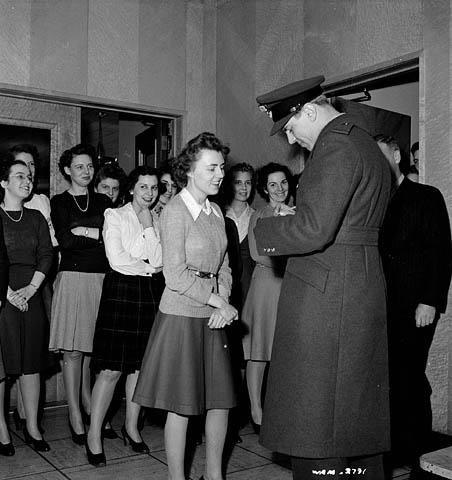
Beurling signing autographs at a war production plant, January 1943

After landing back in Britain, Beurling was then sent to Canada to join a Victory Loan Drive, selling war bonds, being the guest of honour at a parade in Verdun and meeting Prime Minister Mackenzie King. He was promoted to war substantive Flying Officer (on probation) on 30 January 1943. He did not enjoy the war bond campaign. Also, he often said things that embarrassed the RCAF, such as that he enjoyed killing people. The leg wound Beurling had received over Malta, combined with his poor general health, returned him to hospital for several weeks. He completed his promotional work in mid-1943 and also met his future wife, Diana Whittall in Vancouver.

==== Instructor ====
Returning to Britain, Beurling was posted as a gunnery instructor to 61 OTU. On 27 May 1943, he was posted to the Central Gunnery School at RAF Sutton Bridge. On 8 June, during a mock dogfight, Beurling was forced to bail out of Spitfire II P7913 when the engine caught fire after being accidentally hit. It is alleged that whilst stationed at RAF Sutton Bridge he actually flew under the Crosskeys Bridge that crosses the Nene, which still stands today having been built in 1897.

=== Royal Canadian Air Force ===
Beurling with his brothers while on leave in Canada

On 1 September 1943, Beurling transferred to the RCAF, and was posted to an operational squadron, 403 (a return to his first squadron) at Kenley, flying the new Spitfire IX. Shooting down an Fw 190 of JG 2 in September, but unhappy with flying sweeps, Beurling requested command of a flight of North American P-51 Mustangs in order to carry out deep penetration, free-roaming raids into Germany. His request was turned down.

Disciplinary problems annoyed his commander, but Beurling was promoted to flight lieutenant. However, his stunting of a de Havilland Tiger Moth at zero feet over his airfield eventually led to his Wing Commander, Hugh Godefroy, threatening him with a court martial. Subsequently, Beurling was transferred to 126 Wing HQ and then to 412 Squadron.

At 412 Squadron, Beurling again came into conflict with his commander for stunting and his lack of teamwork, leading to his eventual grounding. He claimed his last kill on 30 December, shooting down and wounding Uzz. Heinz Wyrich of 5 Staffel, JG 26 flying a Fw 190A-45 W.Nr. 1175, Weisse 16 2 km S. of Romaine, when the squadron was covering returning American bombers near Compiègne, France.

==== Discharge ====
Beurling returned to Canada in April 1944. He was given an honourable discharge in October and, despite an attempt to join the United States Army Air Forces, his wartime flying was over. He ended his career as a squadron leader with 31 and one shared official kills, nine claimed damaged, along with a DSO, DFC and a DFM and Bar.

== Death ==
In 1948, Beurling was recruited to fly P-51 Mustangs for the Israeli Air Force. After a test flight, Beurling fatally crashed his Noorduyn Norseman transport aircraft while landing at Aeroporto dell'Urbe in Rome on 20 May 1948, just six days after the Israeli Declaration of Independence. Also killed was British volunteer Leonard Cohen, another Malta RAF pilot.

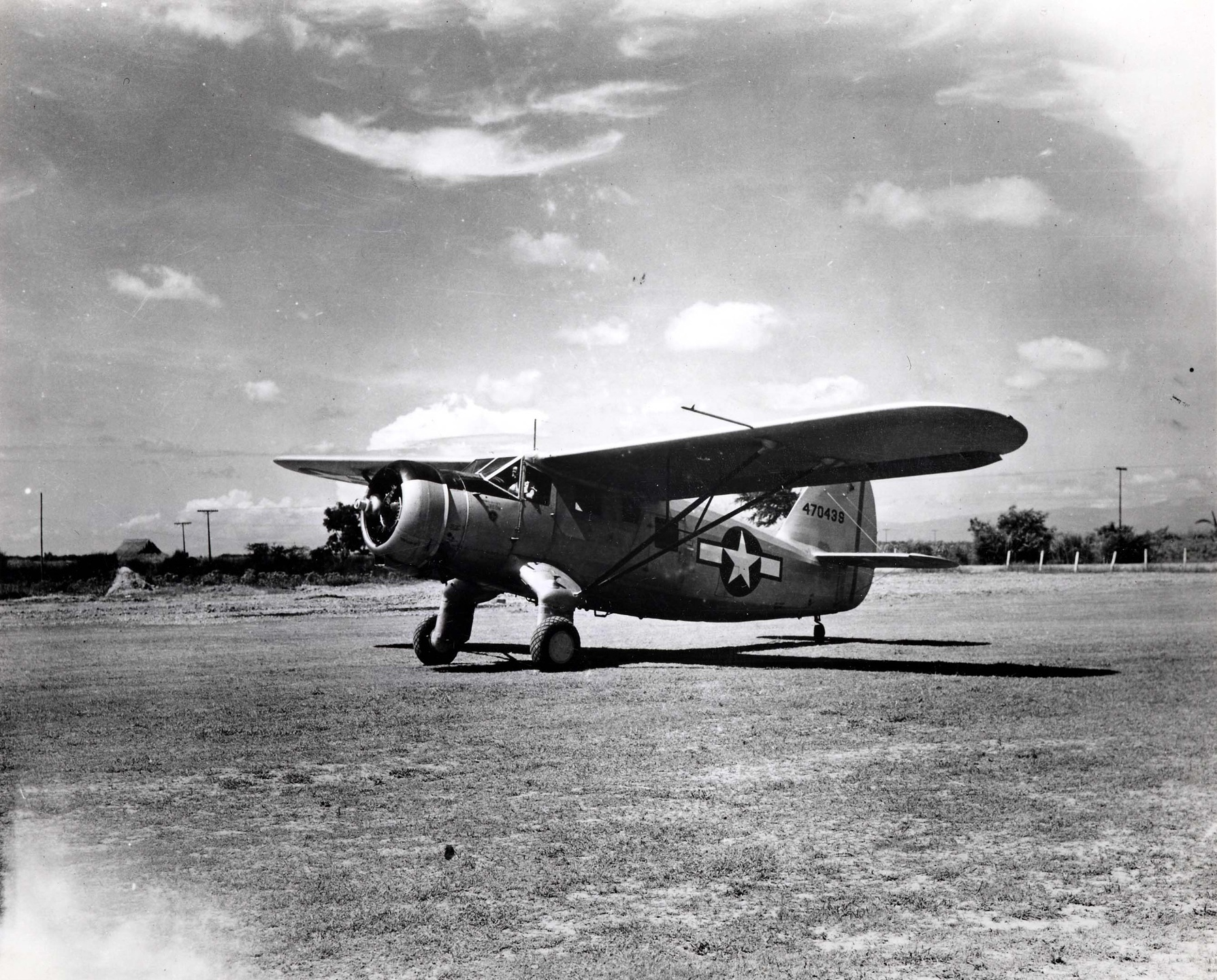
A USAAF 3rd Air Commando Group UC-64A (Norseman) in the Philippines, 1945

It was his tenth crash. Suspicion at the time of the accident centred on possible sabotage, which was never proven. "The initial report, while it identified the crew as Beurling and Cohen, acknowledged that the bodies were burned beyond recognition." Beurling's widow, family and personal friends were not in attendance at the funeral in Rome. On a small brass plate over the lid of the coffin were the words "Colonel Georgio Beurling". (Note: The rank was in error.)

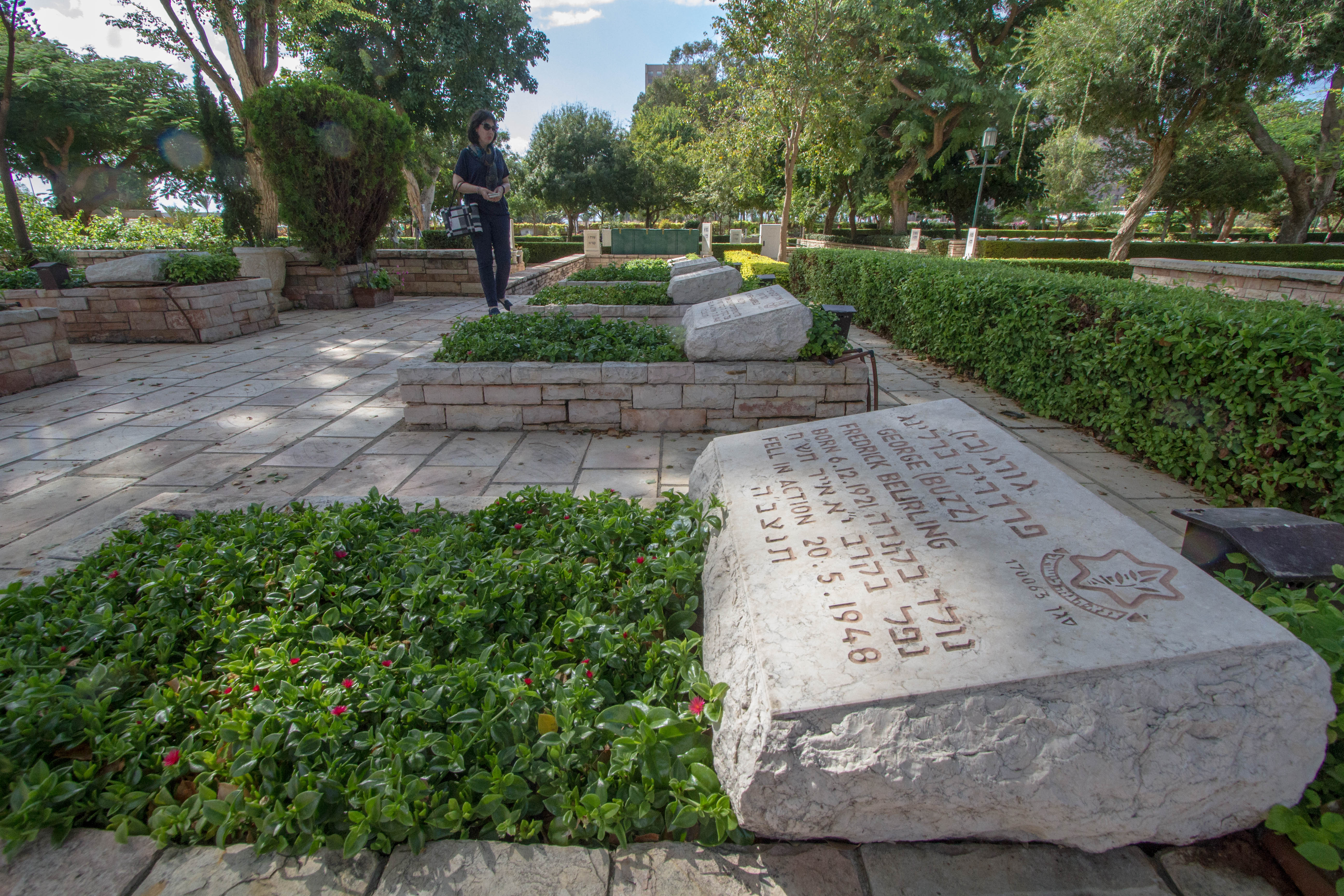
George Beurling's grave in the military cemetery in Haifa, Israel

Beurling's coffin was kept for three months in a warehouse in the Verano Monumental Cemetery, as nobody had claimed the body. Then his widow, Diana Whittall Gardner, had him buried in the Cimitero Acattolico behind the Cestia Pyramid, between the graves of Percy Bysshe Shelley and John Keats. In November 1950, two and half years after his death, Beurling's casket arrived at Haifa Airport. His coffin, draped with the blue and white Israeli flag, was laid in a nearby air force base, where an honour guard of young airmen mounted a silent watch. During the long funeral in the streets of Haifa, Israeli Air Force aircraft paid homage to Beurling. At last, he was re-interred in the military cemetery at the foot of Mount Carmel. The grave is marked, as are the others in Israel Defense Forces cemeteries, with only name, serial number and rank: for Beurling that of segen (lieutenant).

== Legacy ==
Malta Spitfire, an account of his time in Malta, co-written by Leslie Roberts and Beurling, was first published in 1943.

"In Verdun the only reminder of the famous son is the boulevard which carries Beurling's name." Beurling Academy, a high school in the Lester B. Pearson School Board in Verdun, is also named after him.

== Summary of victory claims ==
Beurling was provisionally credited with 31 air victories destroyed (and one third shared destroyed), and 9 damaged.

Chronicle of aerial victories
Claim No.	Date	Flying	Kills	Notes
1	1 May 1942	Spitfire VB W3383 (41 Sqn)	1 x Fw 190	Rodeo 9 to Hardelot; 13.05–14.45 hours. Surviving Luftwaffe records indicate no obvious matching losses. (Possibly Adolf Glunz of JG-26; hits on plane but Glunz returned safely)
2	3 May 1942	Spitfire VB W3636 (41 Sqn)	1 x Fw 190	Shot down 2–3 miles off Cap Gris Nez. Originally recorded as a "probable" and updated later to a confirmed. Surviving Luftwaffe records indicate no obvious matching losses.
	12 June 1942	Spitfire VC BR176 (249 Sqn)	1 x Bf 109 damaged	249 Squadron scrambled a dozen Spitfires against eight Bf 109s. Beurling claimed to have shot the tail off a BF 109 but was only awarded a "damaged". 249 claimed two 109s damaged in total.
3–4–5.	6 July 1942	Spitfire VC BR323	2 x Macchi C.202s and 1 x Bf 109 destroyed. 1 x CANT Z.1007 damaged.	Combat between 8–15 to 8-45am versus three Cant Z1007s bombers from 9 Stormo, escorted by 14 Re 2001s of 2 Gruppo CT and 12 Macchi C. 202s of 20 Gruppo CT. 249 Squadron claimed three fighters in total. Beurling's kills were a C. 202 from 352 Squadriglia, 20 Gruppo CT; (Serg. Magg Francesco Pecchiari was rescued from the sea) and a Re 2001 of 152 Squadriglia 2 Gruppo CT; (Sotto Ten Romano Pagliari was killed). The Bf 109 claimed was a I./JG 77 Bf 109F-4 (Werknummer 13386—factory number) "White 4" flown by Fw. Toni Engels (3 claims, Killed), during a late evening interception of three Ju 88s of II/KG77 escorted by 15 Bf 109s of II./JG 53 and I./JG 77. Spitfires claimed three Bf 109s in total, but Beurling's victim was the sole loss. The RAF fighter force claimed sixteen enemy planes destroyed and nineteen damaged during the day.
6–7	8 July 1942	Spitfire VC BR128	1 x Bf 109 destroyed. 1 x Bf 109 and 1 x Ju 88 damaged	Scrambled at 7–30 am versus 7 Ju 88s, escorted by Bf 109s of I./JG 77 and 21 MC202s of 20 Gruppo. Beurling's Bf 109 was claimed downed into the sea 2 miles South of Gozo. The 24 intercepting Spitfires claimed 3 Ju 88s damaged, 3 Bf 109s destroyed and four other fighters damaged. One C.202 pilot was wounded and his aircraft damaged. Beurling claimed his two aircraft damaged later at 12.30pm.
8–9.	10 July 1942	Spitfire VC BR323	1 x Bf 109 and 1 x MC 202 destroyed	Combat versus 14 Ju 88s escorted by C.202s of 20 Gruppo and Bf 109s of JG 53. Seven Spitfires of 249 claimed two fighters shot down and one damaged, and 603 Squadron a Ju 88 damaged and a Bf 109 probable. Beurling claimed a Bf 109 of Stab/.JG 53, Lt Hans-Jurgen Frodien who was killed in Bf 109F-4 (Werknummer 7366) "Black<2+-". In mid-morning Beurling was part of a 249 Squadron 'bounce' of 20 C.202s and Bf 109s. He shot down the C.202 of Serg Magg. Francesco Visentini (wounded, rescued from sea) of 378 Squadriglia, 155 Gruppo CT.
10–12.	12 July 1942	Spitfire VC BR565	3 x MC202s Destroyed	Scrambled at 9–45 am to intercept 11 Ju 88s, and entered combat with the escort. Beurling shot down a Re 2001 of 358 Squadriglia, 2 Gruppo CT North of Gozo; Ten. Fransesco Vichi was killed ( this aircraft was also attacked by F/O Hetherington). During the later air search by two 2 Gruppo aircraft for the missing Vichi, North of Malta around noon Beurling surprised and shot down both Ten Carlo Seganti, 358 Squadriglia, Ten Col. Aldo Quarantotti (2 Gruppo CO) who were both killed.
13.	23 July 1942	Spitfire VC BR135	1 x Re 2001 destroyed. 1 x Ju 88 damaged	Scrambled at 10.21am and engaged a raid consisting of three Ju 88s and five Re2001 and seven Bf 109s as escort. One Ju 88 was claimed destroyed and two more damaged by the intercepting Spitfires, with a Bf 109 'probable'. Beurling reported then blowing off a Re2001's wing, the wreck crashing into the sea.
14–15–16–17.	27 July 1942	Spitfire VC BR301	2 x C 202s and 2 x Bf 109s destroyed. 2 x Bf 109s damaged.	At 9–15 five 249 Squadron scrambled to engage the departing eight Ju 88 raiding Ta' Qali; In combat with 13 C.202s Beurling downed Serg Falerio Gelli (3 claimed victories) of 378 Squadriglia, 155 Gruppo CT (wounded, he crash-landed near Ta'Kuljat on Gozo and was made POW) and ace Capt. Furio Doglio Niclot (6 claims), C.O. of 151 Squadriglia, 20 Gruppo CT (killed). After lunch Beurling and 249 tangled with Bf 109 escorts. One Bf 109 Beurling downed may have been of Stab./JG 53, Leutnant Karl-Heinz Preu who was reported as shot down by anti aircraft artillery near Valletta in his Bf 109 F-4 (Werknummer 7525) "<3 - + -". That day, JG 53 also reported the loss of Unteroffizier Heinrich-Freckmann from 6. Staffel, flying Bf 109 F-4 (Werknummer 7447). Freckmann went missing in action following aerial combat near Cape Scaramia. Eleven Axis fighters ( 8 Bf 109s and 3 C.202) were claimed during the day; actual losses were three Bf 109s and two C202s.
18.	29 July 1942	Spitfire VC BR301	1 x BF 109 destroyed.	Seven 249 Squadron scrambled to intercept 20 Bf 109s and C.202s. Attacked by a Bf 109 Beurling's canopy was shot off but he managed to evade, and then shoot down a Bf 109 some 3 miles North of Grand Harbour. Bf 109F-4 WNo.13060 "Yellow 2" of 3./JG 77, Uzz. Karl-Heinz Witschke was killed.
19	8 August 1942	Spitfire VB EN973	1 x BF 109 destroyed	Five 249 Sqn. Spitfires engaged eight Bf 109s at 8–30 some 8 miles from Zonkor Point. Beurling's engine was hit but he belly-landed safely, although his Spitfire was a write-off. Ofw. Rollwage (II/ JG 53), Oblt. Freytag & Fw. Pohl (both I./JG 77) claimed fighters shot down.
19.33	13 August 1942	Spitfire VB EP135	Third share x Ju 88 destroyed	Intercepted at 17–40 NE of Linosa. F/L F. Jones, P/O Beurling and Sgt Wynn collectively downed a recon. Ju 88D-1 (Werknummer 430274) "F6+KK" of 2(F)/122; Uzz Schmiedgen, Observer Lt Albert Weiblen and one other unnamed crew MIA.
20.33–21.33.	25 September 1942	Spitfire VB EP706	2 x Bf 109s destroyed. 1 x Bf 109 damaged.	Ten 249 Sqn Spitfires scrambled at 11.20am, and tangled with a dozen Bf 109s. Beurling made the only claims. One I./JG 77 Bf 109G-2 reported to have crash landed on Sicily.
22.33–23.33.	10 October 1942	Spitfire VB EP706	2 x Bf 109s destroyed	Beurling was flying an air test when vectored onto two low-level Bf 109s and entered combat over Filfla. At least one Bf 109 of JG 77 reportedly crash landed on Sicily.
24–25–26.33	13 October 1942	Spitfire VC BR173	2 x Bf 109s and 1 x Ju 88 destroyed. 1 x Ju 88 damaged.	Eight 249 Sqn fighters intercepted 7 Ju 88s and 30 BF 109s over St Paul's Bay; Beurling claimed the Ju 88 of I/LG 1; Fw Anton Wilfner and crew were killed. 249 Squadron claimed one Ju 88 destroyed, one probable and three damaged.
27–28–29.33	14 October 1942	Spitfire VC BR173	2 x Bf 109s and 1 x Ju 88 destroyed	Seven 249 Sqn. fighters entered combat at approx. 1.10pm SE of Zonkor against seven Ju 88s with an escort of Bf 109s from JG 53. One Bf 109 victim was possibly from II./JG 53; (Obfw. Josef Ederer −7 claims- was wounded and crash-landed Bf109F-4 (Werknummer 7619) "Black 1", 40% damaged.) 249 claimed one Ju 88 destroyed, a Ju 88 probable, 2 damaged and 3 Bf 109 destroyed, one probable and two damaged.
30.33	24 September 1943	Spitfire F Mk IX MA585 (403 Sqn)	1 x Fw 190 destroyed	Ramrod No. 243 to the Beauvais/Poix area. Probably of JG 2 – who lost 4 Fw 190s shot down and 3 pilots killed. RAF fighters claimed 12 destroyed.
31.33	30 December 1943	Spitfire LF Mk IX MH883	1 x Fw 190 destroyed.	Lone fighter spotted and shot down 7 miles W Compeigne. Fw 190A-5 (Werknummer 1175) "White 16" of 5./JG 26 (Uzz. Heinz Wyrich (2v) wounded. )
TOTALS			31 kills (plus 1/3 sh)	9 damaged
