= Robert Barton (RAF officer) =

Canadian flying ace of WWII

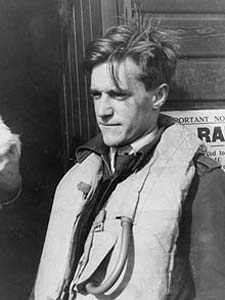
- Barton, 1941–42
- Born: 7 June 1916; Kamloops, British Columbia, Canada
- Died: 2 September 2010 (aged 94); Kamloops, British Columbia, Canada
- Military career
- Allegiance: Canada
- Branch: Royal Air Force
- Service years: 1936–1959
- Rank: Wing Commander
- Nickname: Butch
- Commands: No. 249 Squadron; RAF Skeabrae; RAF North Weald; RAF Acklington
- Conflicts: Second World War: Battle of Britain; Channel Front; Siege of Malta
- Awards: Officer of the Order of the British Empire; Distinguished Flying Cross and Bar; Mention in despatches

Robert Alexander Barton, OBE, DFC & Bar (7 June 1916 – 2 September 2010) was a Canadian-born officer who served in the Royal Air Force (RAF) during the Second World War. He was credited with at least 12 aerial victories.

Born in Kamloops in British Columbia, Barton joined the RAF in early 1936. After his training was completed, he was posted to No. 41 Squadron but following the outbreak of the Second World War was transferred to No. 249 Squadron. Flying the Hawker Hurricane fighter, he flew extensively during the Battle of Britain, claiming several aerial victories. Near the end of the battle, he was awarded the Distinguished Flying Cross. He later flew Hurricanes during the Siege of Malta, achieving more aerial victories. He served in a series of staff and command posts for the remainder of the war. He remained in the RAF in the postwar period, and played a role in the establishment of the Pakistani Air Force. He ended his military career in 1959 and died in September 2010, aged 94.

== Early life ==
Robert Alexander Barton was born in Kamloops, in British Columbia, Canada, on 7 June 1916. While his father, an engineer, was Canadian, his mother was Scottish. The family lived in Penticton, although Barton was educated at Vernon. In 1935 he applied to join the Royal Air Force (RAF) and was accepted on a short service commission. He proceeded to England to commence his flight training in January 1936. Nicknamed 'Butch', he was commissioned as an acting pilot officer in March and after his initial training was completed, went on to No. 9 Flying Training School at Thornaby. In October, he was posted to No. 41 Squadron and early the following year was confirmed in his rank as pilot officer. At the time, the squadron was based at Catterick and operated the Hawker Fury biplane fighter but in January 1939, it began to convert to the Supermarine Spitfire fighter.

== Second World War ==
By the time of the outbreak of the Second World War, Barton was a flying officer. In May 1940, he was transferred to the newly formed No. 249 Squadron. Based at Leconfield, it trained on Hawker Hurricane fighters and became operational in July, moving to Boscombe Down the following month and immediately becoming engaged in the aerial fighting over the southeast of England.

=== Battle of Britain ===
On 15 August, Barton achieved his first aerial victory, a Messerschmitt Bf 110 heavy fighter, which he shot down over Middle Wallop. He also damaged a second Bf 110 in the same area. On 24 August he destroyed two Messerschmitt Bf 109 fighters near the Isle of Wight, one of which shared with another pilot. He shared in the destruction of a Dornier Do 17 medium bomber near Rochford on 2 September. He was shot down himself the next day, during an engagement over the Thames Estuary. He bailed out without mishap.

Barton was promoted to flight lieutenant at the start of the following month, and on 11 September, while flying south east of London, he was one of several pilots that engaged and damaged a number of Heinkel He 111 medium bombers; he was credited with shares in damaging four of these. On 15 September, what later became Battle of Britain Day, he shot down one Do 17 and damaged another. Three days later, he damaged a He 111 over the Thames Estuary. He shot down a Bf 110 on 27 September.

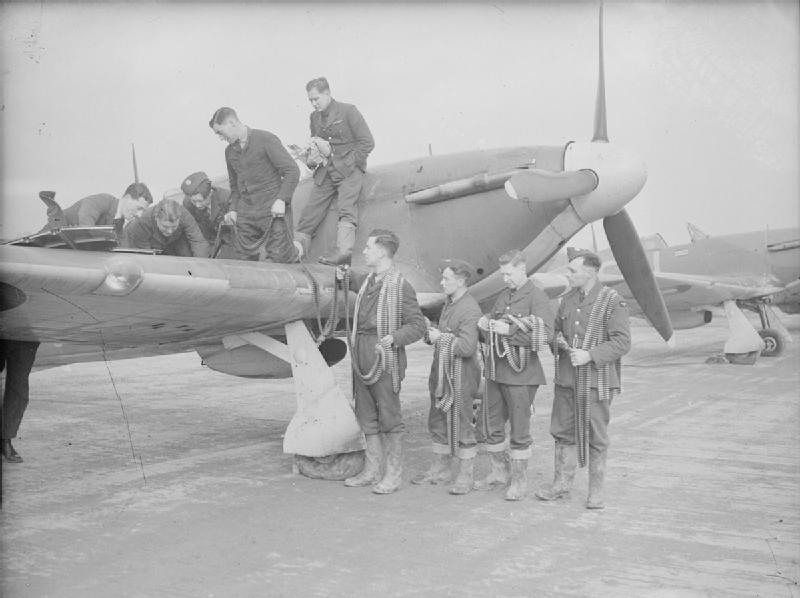
A Hawker Hurricane of No. 249 Squadron being rearmed at North Weald, February 1941

No. 249 Squadron had been intensively engaged in the air battles but the Luftwaffe began to slow down its operational tempo in October. On 22 October, Barton's award of the Distinguished Flying Cross was announced. The published citation read:

This officer has displayed outstanding leadership and has contributed materially to the many successes obtained by his squadron. His skill was particularly displayed on the 28th September when his squadron was responsible for destroying twenty enemy aircraft. Flight Lieutenant Barton has personally destroyed four enemy aircraft and shared in the destruction of others.

— London Gazette, No. 34976, 22 October 1940.

The Luftwaffe had briefly escalated its activities over the final stages of October and a week after being awarded the DFC, Barton destroyed a Bf 109 and damaged two others over North Weald, from where No. 249 Squadron had been based since September. He probably destroyed a Bf 109 off Clacton on 7 November and then four days later, shot down a Junkers Ju 86 medium bomber although it may have been a misidentified Focke-Wulf Fw 58 on a search and rescue mission. The squadron carried out convoy patrols until the start of 1941, when it switched to offensive operations to France. By this time, Barton was its commander, having been promoted to acting squadron leader.

On 4 February, Barton shot down a Bf 110 and damaged a second, both near the Kentish Knock lightship. These were his final aerial victories flying from a RAF station in England.

=== Siege of Malta ===
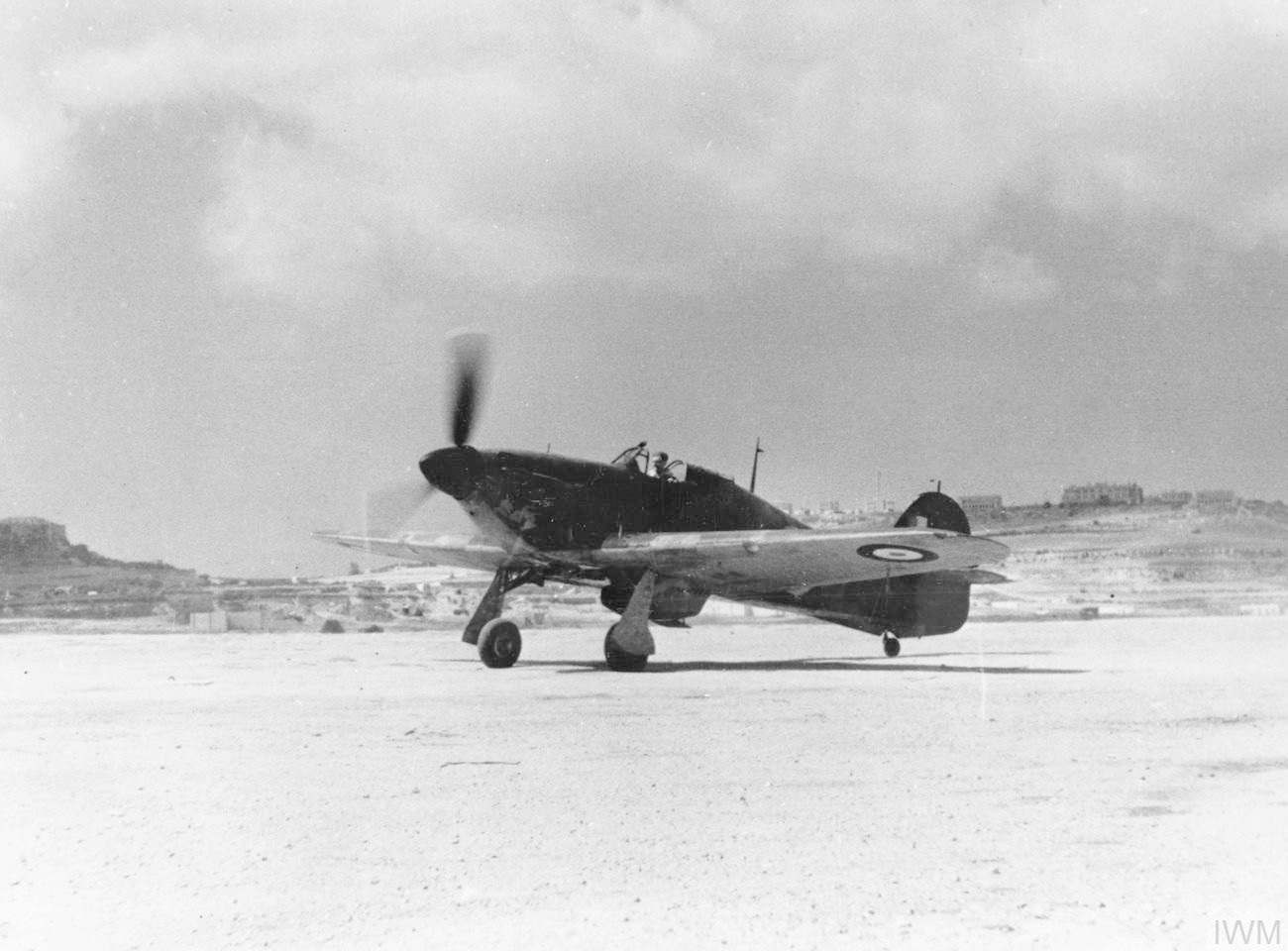
A Hurricane at Te Kali on Malta, 1941

In May, No. 249 Squadron was dispatched to the Middle East, departing from England aboard the aircraft carrier HMS Furious. Its personnel and aircraft were switched to HMS Ark Royal at Gibraltar. On 21 May, with the aircraft carrier about 450 miles (720 km) from Malta, Barton led the squadron's pilots in flying their Hurricanes off the flight deck and onto Malta. It had been planned that they would be refueled and then fly onto Egypt but when the squadron arrived, they were informed they were to relieve No. 261 Squadron, part of Malta's aerial defence. As part of this, they had to swap their new Hurricanes for those of No. 261 Squadron, which were nearly worn out.

No. 249 Squadron became operational on the island on 25 May, Barton leading the first, uneventful, sortie of the day from their base at Ta Kali. By this time, the Luftwaffe had reduced its presence in the region, having been transferred to eastern Europe to support the German invasion of Russia. This left the Italians to continue the aerial offensive on Malta. On 3 June, Barton shot down a Savoia-Marchetti SM.79 medium bomber over Gozo, one of the islands of the Malta group. Four days later, while flying at night, he destroyed a Fiat BR.20 bomber. On both 17 and 25 July, he shot down a Macchi C.200 fighter over Malta. However, the worn out fighters that the squadron was operating were of concern, and pilots experienced a number of engine failures; on 1 August, one such failure occurred to Barton as he was taking off and he had to crash land. In doing so, his aircraft caught fire and he received second degree burns.

After a period of hospital treatment, Barton returned to operations and on 4 September probably destroyed a MC.200 and damaged a second near Cap Passero, and on 19 October, he and another pilot combined to shoot down a Savoia-Marchetti SM.81 bomber south of Lampedusa. His final aerial victory was on 22 November, when he destroyed a Macchi C.202 Folgore to the north east of Gozo. Early the following month, he relinquished command of No. 249 Squadron and returned to England for a rest. By this time, his performance while serving at Malta had been recognised with an award of a Bar to his DFC, the announcement being made on 31 October.

=== Later war service ===
The remainder of Barton's war service was primarily in instructing and staff duties. He initially served in an Operational Training Unit as a wing leader, and was subsequently appointed to a staff role at the headquarters of No. 9 Group. He then commanded the RAF stations at Skeabrae, in the Orkney Islands north of Scotland, and at North Weald. During his service at the latter post, he was mentioned in despatches on 1 January 1945. When the war ended in Europe, Barton was a wing commander and serving in a staff role at the headquarters of Fighter Command. Shortly afterwards, he was appointed an Officer of the Order of the British Empire in the King's Birthday Honours. He finished the war solely credited with twelve enemy aircraft destroyed, and another five that were shared with other pilots. He also credited with two aircraft probably destroyed, and nine damaged, four of the latter shared.

== Later life ==
In August 1945, Barton was sent to British India, serving at the headquarters of the Air Staff there. He received a permanent commission in the RAF, with effect from 1 July 1946. Following the Partition of India in August 1947, he helped in the formation of the Pakistani Air Force. Later returning to the United Kingdom, Barton served in a series of command and staff roles, including one period as commander of the RAF station at Acklington. His final appointment was to the Air Ministry in London, from where, in February 1959, he retired from the RAF.

Barton and his wife Gwen née Cranswick, who he had married in 1939, settled back in British Columbia in 1965. His wife suffered poor health, and in their later years, they spent part of each year in Arizona, in the United States. Barton died at Kamploops on 2 September 2010. He was survived by a son, his wife having predeceased him by several years. His remains were cremated and on 15 September, the anniversary of Battle of Britain Day, the ashes were scattered in a lake.
