= Malta Spitfire =

1943 book by George Beurling

Malta Spitfire: The Diary of a Fighter Pilot is a book written about George Beurling, a Canadian Fighter Pilot, and his time served in Malta during World War II. It was written by himself with the help of Leslie Roberts. This book was published in 1943 and has been reprinted several times.
