= Albert Gerald Lewis =

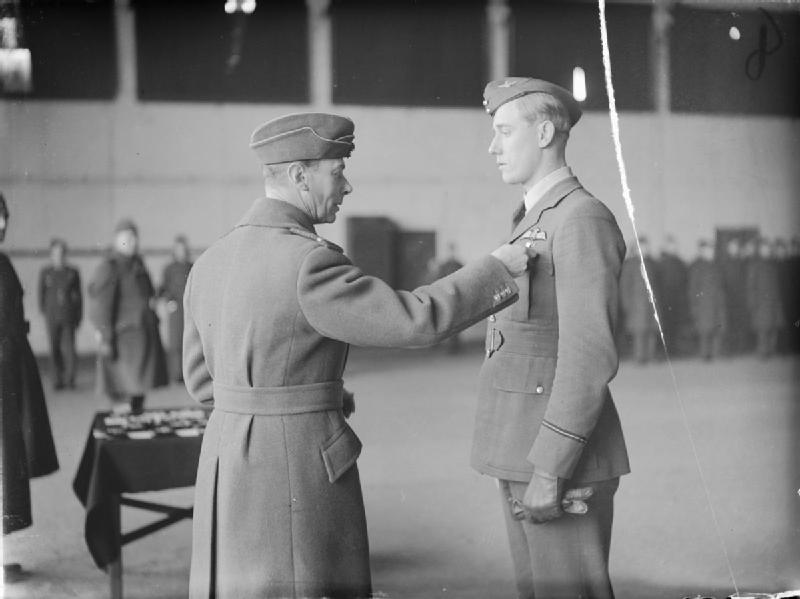
- King George VI conferring on Lewis a Bar to his DFC, c.1940
- Born: 18 April 1918; Kimberley, South Africa
- Died: 14 December 1982 (aged 64)
- Military career
- Allegiance: United Kingdom
- Branch: Royal Air Force
- Service years: 1938–1946
- Rank: Squadron Leader
- Nickname: Zulu
- Units: No. 249 Squadron; No. 85 Squadron
- Commands: No. 261 Squadron
- Conflicts: Second World War: Battle of Britain
- Awards: Distinguished Flying Cross & Bar
- Other work: Farming

Albert Gerald Lewis, DFC & Bar (10 April 1918 – 14 December 1982) was a South African fighter pilot and fighter ace who scored an ace in a day during the Battle of Britain, later being featured in a Life magazine article about the Battle of Britain.

== Early life ==
Born in Kimberley on 10 April 1918, Lewis attended Kimberley Boys' High School.

== Royal Air Force career ==
Lewis joined the Royal Air Force when he was 20. He flew with No. 616 Squadron at the outbreak of hostilities as a ferry pilot. He was confirmed in his pilot officer rank in November. He then moved to No. 504 Squadron, flying Hurricanes. He then moved to No. 85 Squadron in France in April 1940. On 19 May he shot down five enemy aircraft before he was himself shot down over Lille.

On 29 April Lewis married Betty Yvonne Coxon at St. Paul's Church, Whiteshill, Stroud, where he would later farm.

In June 1940 Lewis was awarded the Distinguished Flying Cross (DFC). The citation, published in The London Gazette, read:

Pilot Officer Lewis has, by a combination: of great personal courage, determination and skill in flying, shot down five enemy aircraft, single-handed, in one day. He has destroyed in all a total of seven enemy aircraft, and by his example has been an inspiration to his squadron.

— London Gazette, No. 34881, 25 June 1940

On 18 August 1940 Lewis probably destroyed a Bf 110 and on the 31st a Bf 109.

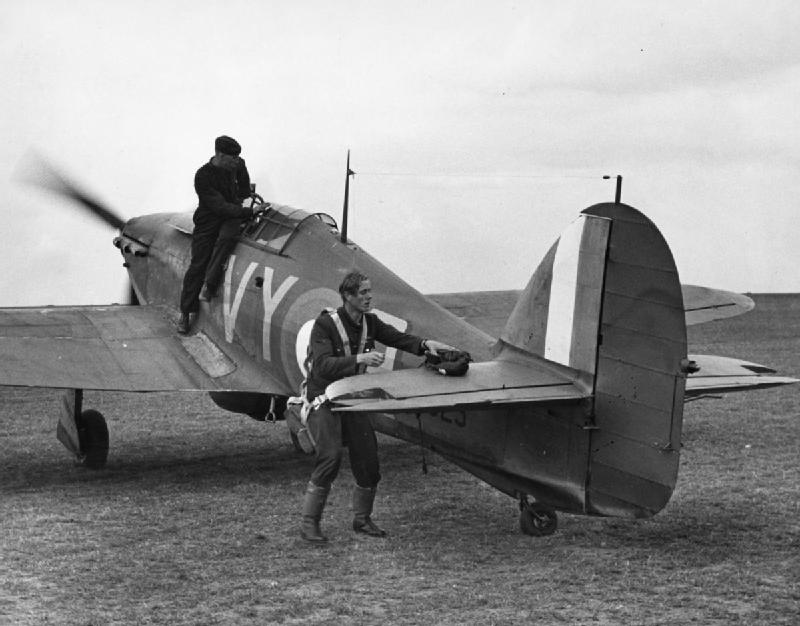
Lewis preparing to take off in his Hawker Hurricane, Colincamps, July 1940

=== No. 249 Squadron ===
Lewis then joined No. 249 Squadron on 15 September 1940. On the same day he shot down a He 111 and on the 18th a Bf 109 (his twelfth confirmed enemy aircraft). On 27 September he claimed six kills (three Bf 109s, two Bf 110s and a Ju 88), two probables and one damaged. While on a patrol on 28 September he was shot down and he baled out of his Hurricane over Faversham and was taken to Faversham Cottage Hospital, blind for two weeks, and with shrapnel in his legs with severe burns on the face, throat, hands and legs.

Lewis returned to the squadron in December 1940, having been promoted flight lieutenant on 29 November. He was flying by 17 January 1941, and became "A" Flight Commander, and was awarded a Bar to his DFC. The published citation read:

One day in September, 1940, this officer destroyed six enemy aircraft; this makes a total of eighteen destroyed by him. His courage and keenness are outstanding.

— London Gazette, No. 34976, 22 October 1940

=== Overseas service ===
Lewis volunteered for overseas service and was posted to No. 261 Squadron in January 1942. Via Sierra Leone he went to Trincomalee in China Bay, Ceylon to take command of No. 261 Squadron.

On return to Britain he was made Chief Flying instructor at Tealing in Scotland and then went to No. 10 Group HQ at Box in Wiltshire in 1944–45. He left the Royal Air Force in 1946, having been an acting squadron leader since 22 April 1943. His final tally was 18 kills.

== After the war ==
After the war Lewis went to the Royal Agricultural College in Cirencester. In 1947 he returned to South Africa and in 1951 joined the Tobacco Research Board in Southern Rhodesia. In 1953 he became a member of the Church of Jesus Christ of Latterday Saints (Mormons) and during 1953–55 he studied in the United States, but returned to farm in England in 1957.
