= Raoul Daddo-Langlois =

British flying ace

- Born: 1922; Guernsey, Channel Islands
- Died: 10 July 1943 (aged 21); Sicily, Italy
- Military career
- Allegiance: United Kingdom
- Branch: Royal Air Force
- Service years: 1940–1943 †
- Rank: Flight Lieutenant
- Nickname: 'Daddy Longlegs'
- Units: No. 66 Squadron; No. 249 Squadron; No. 93 Squadron
- Conflicts: Second World War: Siege of Malta; Invasion of Sicily

Raoul Daddo-Langlois (1922 – 10 July 1943) was a British flying ace of the Royal Air Force (RAF) during the Second World War. He was credited with destroying at least five aircraft.

From the Channel Islands, Daddo-Langlois joined the RAF in 1940 and on completion of his flight training was posted to No. 66 Squadron. In February 1942, he was sent to Malta and assigned to No. 249 Squadron, he achieved a number of aerial victories before departing the island in July. He served as an instructor for several months before returning to operational duties, briefly serving with a photo-reconnaissance squadron before returning to Malta to join No. 93 Squadron. He flew a number of sorties prior to and during the Allied invasion of Sicily. On 10 July 1943, his aircraft was damaged during an engagement with German bombers. Severely injured in the following crash-landing on a beach, he was killed in an incident of friendly fire when the boat transporting him to a hospital ship was bombed and sunk.

== Early life ==
Raoul Daddo-Langlois, born William Raoul Daddo-Langlois in Guernsey, the Channel Islands, in 1922, was the son of William James Daddo-Langlois, an officer serving in the Royal Air Force (RAF), and his wife Dorothy Darling. Much of Daddo-Langlois's early life was spent on the RAF stations at which his father was based. Educated at Chard School as a boarder, he was an active sportsman and desired a career as a journalist. His preferred vocation was not supported by his father and instead, once his education was completed, he became a teacher at a school in Sussex.

== Second World War ==
Daddo-Langlois joined the RAF in the autumn of 1940 and after attending an Initial Training Wing at Cambridge, was sent to Canada for flying instruction. At No. 11 Elementary Flying School in Ontario, he flew Fleet Finch training aircraft and proceeded to No. 2 Service Flying Training School where he was instructed on North American Harvard trainers. A fellow student was Laddie Lucas, and the two became friends. Having gained his wings and been promoted to pilot officer on probation in February 1941, Daddo-Langlois returned to the United Kingdom three months later.

After attending No. 52 Operational Training Unit (OTU) at Debden, both Daddo-Langlois and Lucas were posted to No. 66 Squadron in July. Their new squadron, based at Perranporth in the West Country, operated Supermarine Spitfire fighters on patrols and bomber escort missions to Holland. On at least two occasions Daddo-Langlois was involved with failed interceptions of incoming German bombers, but otherwise he saw little action and became bored. While on a test flight, he took it upon himself to make a sortie to Brittany, in France, and attack any targets he could identify. His Spitfire was damaged by anti-aircraft fire and on his return to base, he was disciplined but avoided a courtmartial, thanks to the discretion of his squadron's commander.

=== Malta ===
In early 1942, Daddo-Langlois volunteered for service in Burma. However, he and Lucas, another volunteer, were instead sent to Malta along with 13 other pilots. Flown aboard a Short Sunderland flying boat, they arrived at Kalafrana on 16 February and were posted to No. 185 Squadron, based at Takali and operating tired Hawker Hurricane fighters. Daddo-Langlois, unfamiliar with the aircraft, crashed one on his second flight with the unit. Later in the month he was transferred to No. 249 Squadron. By this time, he was a flying officer, having been promoted a week after his arrival on the island.

No. 249 Squadron operated newly arrived Spitfires from Takali, part of Malta's aerial defences against attacking Italian and German bombers. On 10 March Daddo-Langlois, who was nicknamed Daddy Longlegs by his fellow pilots, made his first claim, for a damaged Messerschmitt Bf 109 fighter that he engaged over Malta. This was the first engagement for the Spitfires on the island. On 4 April, Daddo-Langlois damaged a Junkers Ju 88 medium bomber. His own aircraft was damaged in the encounter. Although he safely landed back at Takali, the scarcity of aircraft meant that it was several days before he flew again. He and other pilots not flying would pitch in and help with repairing bomb-damaged facilities at the airfield. On 20 April, while making a head-on attack against a Bf 109, he collided with his target and, missing his wing tip, had to make a crash-landing. The Bf 109 was destroyed in the encounter, Daddo-Langlois seeing it going down into the sea.

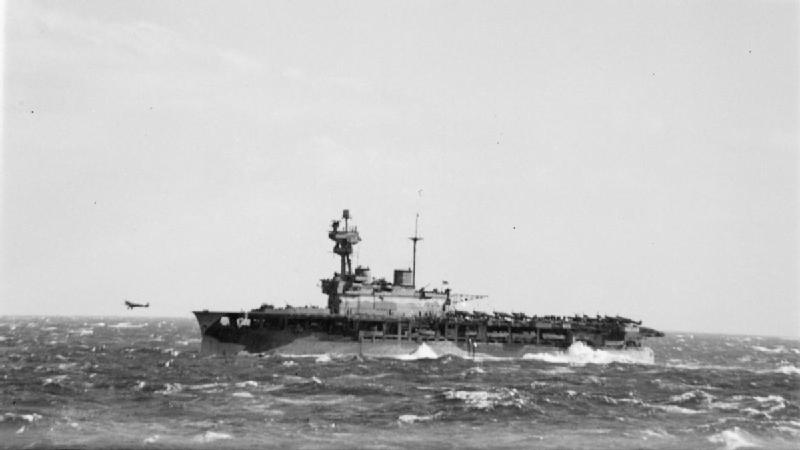
A Spitfire taking off from the aircraft carrier HMS Eagle

At the end of April, Daddo-Langlois was one of five pilots flown to Gibraltar and embarked onto HMS Eagle, an aircraft carrier transporting new Spitfires to Malta. He flew one of these off Eagle on 18 May, making a safe landing on Malta. On a sortie to the east of Zonkor on 6 June, he destroyed a Reggiane Re.2001 fighter. He shot down a Ju 88 over Malta on 2 July and then two days later shared in the destruction of what he claimed as a CANT Z.1007 bomber. An Italian prisoner of war later told him it was a Savoia-Marchetti SM.84. His final aerial victory while serving at Malta came on 11 July, when he shot down a Bf 109 over the island.

Along with Lucas, Daddo-Langlois departed Malta on 18 July for the United Kingdom. He was subsequently posted to No. 52 OTU, at Chedworth, on instructing duties. He found the work dull and in April, having been promoted to flight lieutenant two months previously, sought a posting to a photo reconnaissance unit (PRU). Lucas, now commanding a squadron and not believing Daddo-Langlois had the right temperament to be a PRU pilot, tried to talk him out of it but failed. Assigned to No. 543 Squadron in May, Daddo-Langlois was tasked with flying a new PRU Spitfire Mk IX to Libya. While crossing Algeria, he had to land in the desert after running out of fuel. Abandoning his Spitfire, he was rescued by local Arabs and with their assistance made his way to his intended destination, Castel Benito.

=== Invasion of Sicily ===
Instead of returning to the United Kingdom so that he could fly another PRU Spitfire back to the Middle East, Daddo-Langlois sought a posting to a fighter squadron instead. He was duly posted to No. 93 Squadron, which was at Malta, and arrived on the island on 30 June. Flying as one of the squadron's flight commanders, he was soon engaged on bomber escort missions to Sicily, preparing for the forthcoming Allied invasion of the island.

On the day of the invasion itself, No. 93 Squadron flew protective patrols over the landing beaches. Daddo-Langlois led his flight in intercepting several Ju 88s that were bombing the beaches below. He reported over his radio that he had shot one down but, due to damage to his Spitfire, was going to attempt to land on the Sicilian beaches. He was severely injured when he crashlanded. Unconscious, he was treated by a Royal Navy surgeon ashore before he transferred to a hospital ship. The small boat that he was being transported on was accidentally bombed upon by American aircraft and was sunk. His body was retrieved the following day and was buried at sea.

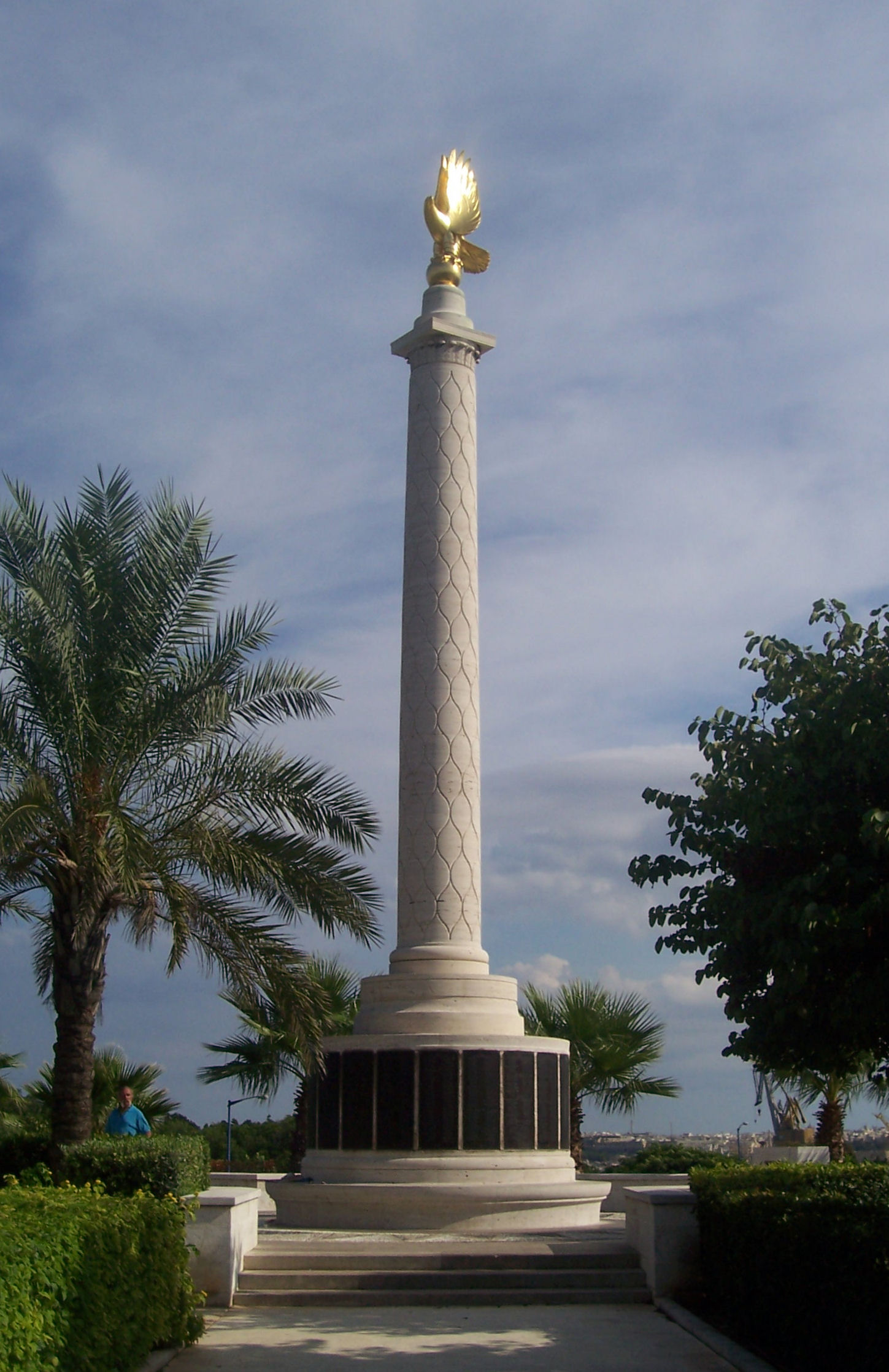
The Malta Memorial on which Daddo-Langlois's name is listed

Daddo-Langlois is credited with having shot down five aircraft, including the Ju 88 that he reported destroyed on the day of his death, and sharing in the destruction of a sixth. He also damaged two more aircraft. His name is recorded on the Malta Memorial, which commemorates the nearly 2,300 Commonwealth airmen who were killed over and around the Mediterranean.
