= Kalkara Naval Cemetery =

CWGC cemetery in Malta

Coordinates: 35°53′13″N 14°32′11″E

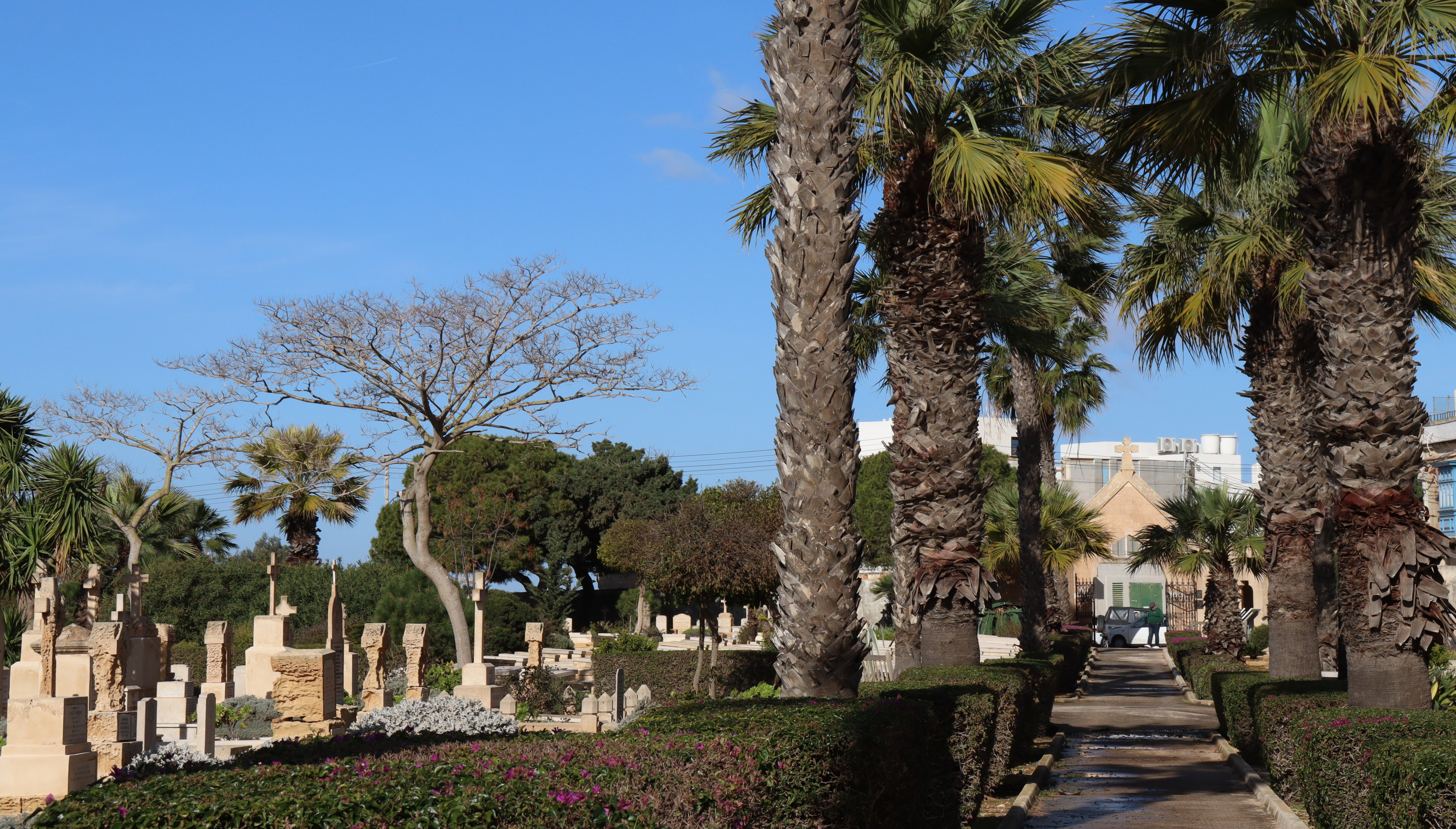
The Kalkara Naval Cemetery in 2026

The Kalkara Naval Cemetery (or Capuccini Naval Cemetery) is a cemetery in Kalkara in the South Eastern Region of Malta. The main entrance to the cemetery is at the junction of Triq Santu Rokku and Triq San Leonardu. The cemetery is divided into Protestant and Roman Catholic sections.

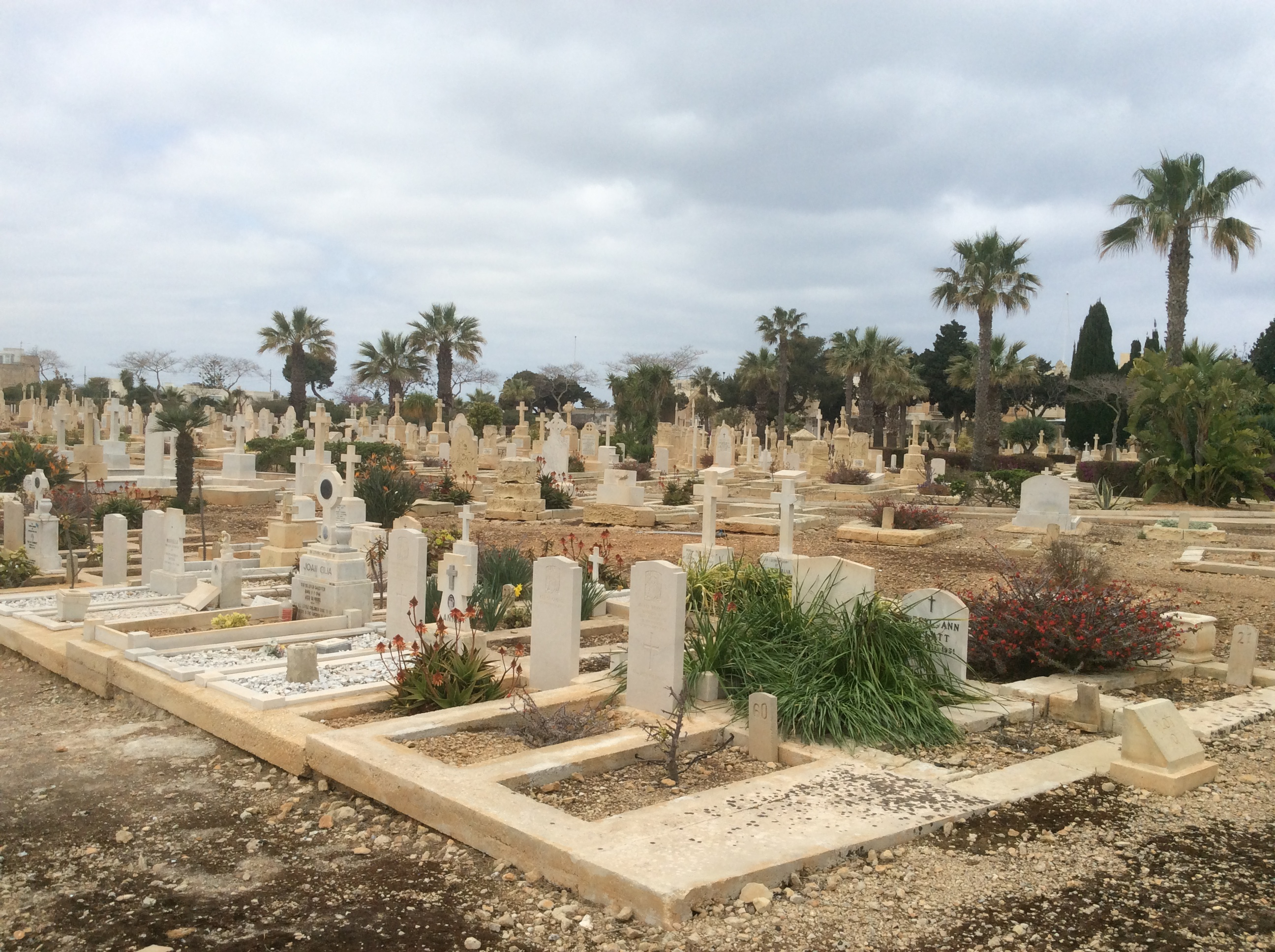
The cemetery in 2017

The cemetery formerly belonged to the British Royal Navy. The cemetery contains 1085 graves of Commonwealth military personnel killed in the country in World War I and World War II in addition to 1,445 non military burials and 137 war graves of people of non-commonwealth nationalities. Many graves are marked by Commonwealth War Graves Commission (CWGC) gravestones. The majority of the 351 Commonwealth burials from World War I and the 694 Commonwealth burials from World War II are buried in the Protestant section of the cemetery.

It is listed Grade 1 on the National Inventory of the Cultural Property of the Maltese Islands.

== Notable burials ==
- The Japanese Naval Memorial commemorates the 68 Japanese sailors who were killed in the 1917 attack on the Japanese destroyer Sakaki near Crete
- Norman Macqueen
- Ernest Wild
- 44 men from HMS Egmont
- 22 who were killed in the 1916 mine attack near Malta on HMS Russell
