= George Palliser =

George Charles Calder Palliser
- Born: 11 January 1919; West Hartlepool, England
- Died: 24 September 2011 (aged 92); Black Rock, Victoria, Australia
- Military career
- Allegiance: United Kingdom
- Branch: Royal Air Force
- Service years: 1939–1947
- Rank: Flight lieutenant
- Nickname: Tich
- Conflicts: Second World War: Battle of Britain; Battle of Malta
- Awards: Distinguished Flying Cross; Air Efficiency Award

George Charles Calder "Tich" Palliser, DFC, AE (11 January 1919 – 24 September 2011) was a Royal Air Force fighter pilot and flying ace of the Second World War. Palliser flew during the Battle of Britain and, at the time of his death, was one of the last survivors of "The Few".

== Early life ==
Born in West Hartlepool on 11 January 1919, Palliser was educated at Brougham School and later attended a Technical School.

== RAF career ==
Palliser joined the Royal Air Force Volunteer Reserve in 1939 as an airman under training as a pilot. He was called up to full-time service, at the rank of sergeant pilot at the outbreak of war, and was posted to No. 3 ITW Hasting, moved to No. 11 EFTS Perth on 5 Dec 1939 and went to No. 6 Flying Training School at RAF Little Rissington in April 1940. Pallister converted to Hurricanes at No. 6 Operational Training Unit at RAF Sutton Bridge in July 1940 and joined No. 17 Squadron RAF at RAF Debden on 3 August 1940 during the Battle of Britain. He moved to No. 43 Squadron RAF at RAF Tangmere on 18 August 1940 and then No. 249 Squadron RAF at RAF North Weald on 14 September 1940. During the Battle of Britain, Palliser claimed eight victories.

Pallister was commissioned in April 1941 and embarked with No. 249 Squadron on HMS Furious on 10 May and sailed for Gibraltar, and on arrival the squadron transferred to HMS Ark Royal. The squadron flew to Ta' Qali on 21 May 1941 to take part in the Siege of Malta. During that battle, he claimed a further five victories.

In January 1942 he was posted to No. 605 Squadron RAF as flight commander. Palliser was awarded the Distinguished Flying Cross, which was gazetted on 30 January 1942. He left Malta on 26 February 1942 as one of the island's longest serving pilots. He was quoted as saying:

But I wasn't there for medals. It was like a job. Fly, fly, shoot one down... start again the next day. I only said my prayers sometimes when I took off... when it was a tight battle... But that parachute on my back was like an angel by my side.

Palliser arrived at No. 25 Air School at Standerton, South Africa on 28 March 1942 to be an instructor at the school. Palliser was posted to No. 62 CFS, Bloemfontein on 17 July, to 2 EFTS Randfontein on 19 October and then to 4 EFTS Benoni on 2 September 1943. He was admitted to Baragwanath Military Hospital in Johannesburg on 21 January 1944 and remained there until leaving for Great Britain on 24 May 1944.

Palliser instructed at No. 15 EFTS at RAF Kingstown from September 1944. He moved to No. 10 FTS at RAF Woodley on 19 September 1945, where he instructed until 16 March 1946. Palliser was an instructor at the CFS at RAF South Cerney until October 1946, when he was posted as an instructor to No. 23 Flying School at Heany, Southern Rhodesia.

In October 1947, Palliser retired from the RAF at the rank of flight lieutenant.

=== Victories ===
Chronicle of aerial victories
Date	Aircraft type	Location	Comments
15 Sep 1940	Do 17		Destroyed (shared)
21 Sep 1940	Do 17		Damaged
27 Sep 1940	Me 110		Destroyed
27 Sep 1940	Me 110		Destroyed
21 Oct 1940	Do 17		Damaged
7 Nov 1940	Messerschmitt Bf 109		Destroyed
4 Feb 1941	Me 110		Destroyed
10 Feb 1941	Messerschmitt Bf 109		Probable destruction
7/8 Jun 1941	SM 79		Probable destruction
12 Jun 1941	Z506B		Destroyed (shared)
18 Jun 1941	Mc200		Destroyed (shared)
19 Jun 1941	SM81		Destroyed (shared)
20 Dec 1941	Ju 88		Destroyed
20 Dec 1941	Messerschmitt Bf 109		Destroyed
24 Dec 1941	Ju 88		Destroyed (shared)
24 Dec 1941	Ju 88		Destroyed (shared)

== Post-war ==
Following his career in the RAF, Palliser moved to South Africa with his family. He settled and recommenced his career as an engineer, including ship and plane building. An illustrious career, including senior positions in the mining industry later took him and his family to the United States, Asia, and finally Australia.

Palliser lived with his daughter in Victoria, Australia. He used his profile as a Battle of Britain veteran to raise funds for the new education centre at the Battle of Britain Memorial, Capel-le-Ferne. He was a keen follower of modern technology – even having his own facebook account.

He died on 24 September 2011 in Black Rock, Victoria, Australia.
