= Eric Wright =

Eric Wright may refer to:

== Sports ==
- Eric Wright (cornerback, born 1959), American football cornerback for the San Francisco 49ers in the 1980s
- Eric Wright (cornerback, born 1985), American football cornerback
- Eric Wright (wide receiver) (born 1969), American football wide receiver
- Eric Wright (footballer) (born 1980), Liberian footballer

== Others ==
- Eric Wright (writer) (1929–2015), Canadian writer of mystery novels
- Eric Darnell Wright or Lil Eazy-E (born 1984), American rapper
- Eric Joseph Wright (1912–1979), Australian general practitioner, medical administrator and public servant
- Eric Lloyd Wright (1929–2023), American architect
- Eric Lynn Wright or Eazy-E (1964–1995), American rapper, producer, and record executive
- Eric William Wright (1919–2007), Battle of Britain RAF officer

== See also ==
- Erik Olin Wright (1947–2019), sociologist
