= Bunny Currant =

British flying ace

Christopher Frederick Currant
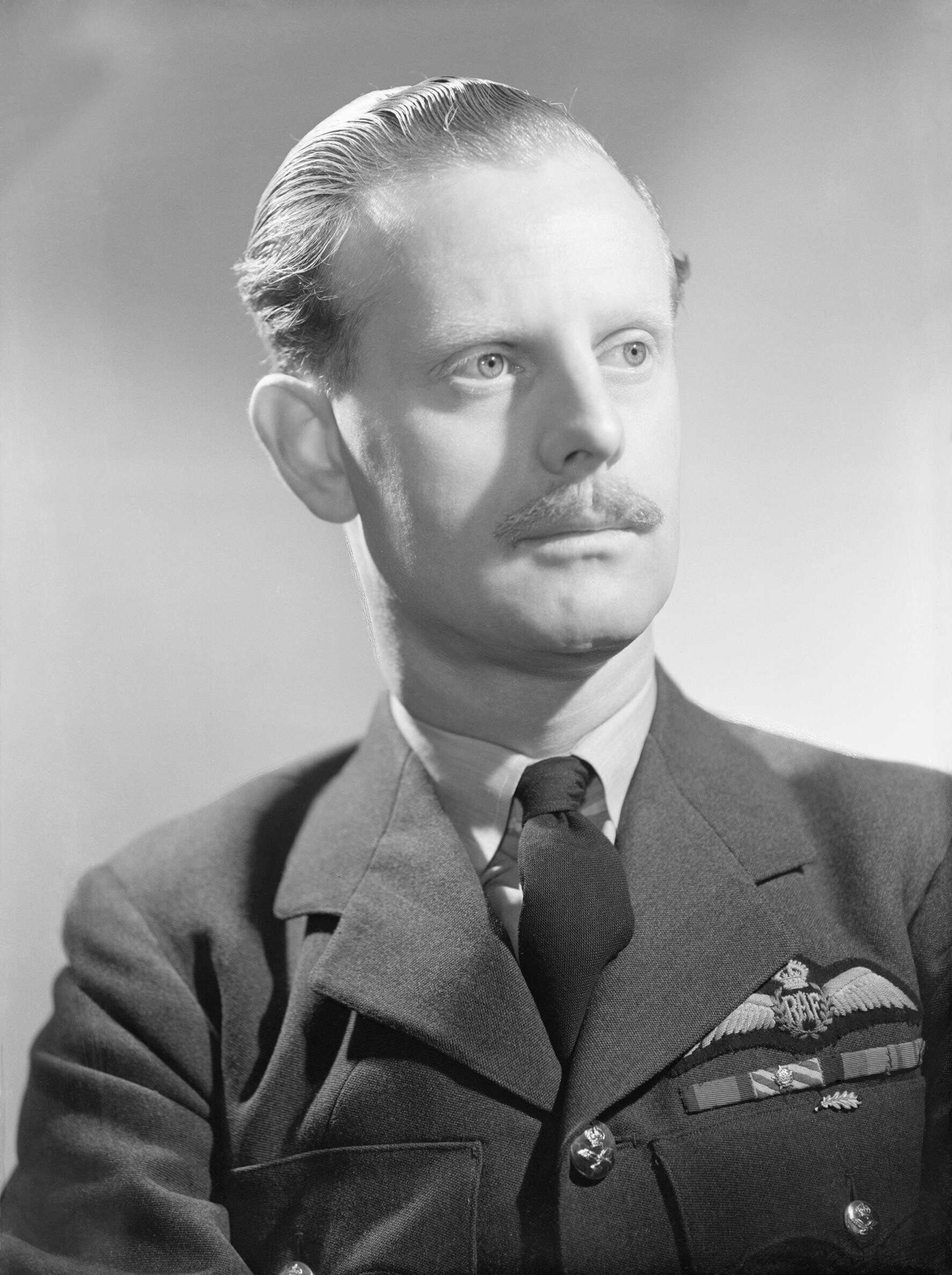
- Christopher Currant as Wing Commander with the Second Tactical Air Force circa 1943
- Born: 14 December 1911; Luton, Bedfordshire, England
- Died: 12 March 2006 (aged 94); Taunton, Somerset, England
- Military career
- Allegiance: United Kingdom
- Branch: Royal Air Force
- Service years: 1936–1959
- Rank: Wing Commander
- Nickname: 'Bunny'
- Commands: No. 122 Wing; No. 501 Squadron
- Conflicts: Second World War: Battle of France; Battle of Britain; Circus offensive
- Awards: Distinguished Service Order; Distinguished Flying Cross & Bar; Mentioned in Despatches (2); Knight of the Order of St. Olav (Norway); Croix de guerre (Belgium)

Christopher Frederick Currant, DSO, DFC & Bar (14 December 1911 – 12 March 2006) was a British Royal Air Force (RAF) fighter pilot and flying ace of the Second World War. He was credited with at least fifteen aerial victories.

Born in Luton, Currant, who was nicknamed 'Bunny', joined the RAF in 1936 and was posted to No. 46 Squadron once his training was completed. At the time of the outbreak of the Second World War, he was serving with No. 605 Squadron. He flew in the Battle of France and then the subsequent Battle of Britain, achieving a number of aerial victories during the latter. He later served as an instructor and then took command of No. 501 Squadron, flying several offensive sorties to occupied Europe. He was also involved in the making of the film The First of the Few. During the later stages of the war, he commanded No. 122 Wing. After the war he remained in the RAF, serving in staff positions as well as on secondment to the Royal Norwegian Air Force. He retired from the RAF in 1959 and subsequently worked for an engineering firm. He died in 2006 at the age of 94.

== Early life ==
Christopher Frederick Currant, who was nicknamed 'Bunny', was born on 14 December 1911 in Luton, Bedfordshire, and went to Rydal School in Wales. He joined the Royal Air Force (RAF) in January 1936, when he was 25; after gaining his wings, he joined No. 46 Squadron as a sergeant pilot in 1937. Based at Kenley at the time, the squadron operated Gloster Gauntlet fighters. He was subsequently posted to No. 151 Squadron, which also operated Gauntlets although these were soon replaced by Hawker Hurricane fighters.

== Second World War ==
During the early months of the Second World War, Currant's squadron was engaged in patrolling duties. He suffered an engine failure on one of these patrols on 15 March 1940, and had to make a forced landing at North Weald. Commissioned as a pilot officer in April, Currant was posted to No. 605 Squadron at Wick. This was another Hurricane squadron, which was tasked with the defence of the Royal Navy base at Scapa Flow.

A week after the 10 May invasion of France and the Low Countries, No. 605 Squadron was moved to Hawkinge in Kent; from here the squadron flew sorties to France where Luftwaffe aircraft were attacking the retreating British Expeditionary Force. On 22 May, the engine on his Hurricane failed after an engagement with a Luftwaffe bomber, forcing him to crash land in a French field. His nose was broken and he had to make his own way to Calais where he managed to get a lift on board a vessel back to England. He was subsequently hospitalised at Folkestone.

=== Battle of Britain ===
After the campaign in France, No. 605 Squadron had been moved to Drem for a rest and to reequip. During its time there, it took part in the interception of the Luftflotte 5 raid that targeted the northeast of England on 15 August. Currant shot down two Heinkel He 111 medium bombers over Newcastle and claimed a third as probably destroyed. In September the squadron moved south, this time to RAF Croydon and was soon in the midst of the heaviest fighting as the Luftwaffe's campaign over London escalated. On 8 September, Currant damaged a Dornier Do 17 medium bomber and a Messerschmitt Bf 109 fighter, both over Maidstone. The next day, he shared in the destruction of a Bf 109 and a Messerschmitt Bf 110 heavy fighter in the Brooklands region. He destroyed a He 111 over southeast London on 11 September and damaged four other He 111s the same day.

Currant shared in the destruction of a Do 17 to the south of Hastings on 12 September. He was promoted to flight lieutenant the following day. Three days later, on what became known as Battle of Britain Day, he shot down a pair of Do 17s over the southeast coast, damaged three more Do 17s and a He 111, and also destroyed a Bf 109. On 27 September he destroyed a Bf 110 over Kenley and damaged a Bf 109. The next day, he shot down a Bf 109 near Tenterden. He shared in the destruction of a Ju 88 on 4 October near Dungeness. On 8 October, the same day he helped destroy another Ju 88, this time near Gatwick, his award of the Distinguished Flying Cross (DFC) was announced. The published citation read:

This officer has led his flight with great skill and courage in air combats in the defence of London. He has destroyed seven enemy aircraft and damaged a number of others. His splendid example and fine fighting spirit have inspired the other pilots in his flight.

— London Gazette, No. 34964, 8 October 1940

On 15 October Currant destroyed a Bf 109 in the vicinity of Rochester, his last aerial victory of the Battle of Britain. In early November he became commander of No. 605 Squadron, having taken over in an acting capacity following the death of the incumbent, Squadron Leader Archie McKellar. He was awarded a Bar to his DFC, the award announced on 15 November. The published citation read:

Since September, 1940, this officer has personally destroyed six enemy aircraft and damaged several others, bringing his total to thirteen. He has led his flight, and occasions his squadron, with great success, and shows a sound knowledge of tactics against the enemy.

— London Gazette, No. 34993, 15 November 1940

Currant was succeeded by Squadron Leader Gerald Edge as commander of No. 605 Squadron at the end of November. He destroyed a Bf 109 over Dover on 1 December. No. 605 Squadron began operating offensively from early 1941, carrying out sorties across the English Channel to northern France. In February, Currant was posted to No. 52 Operational Training Unit at Debden, becoming its chief flying instructor in July. By this time, he held the rank of acting squadron leader.

=== Later war service ===
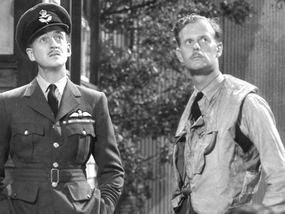
David Niven and Bunny Currant in The First of the Few (1942)

In August, Currant was given command of No. 501 Squadron, which was based at Ibsley and operated the Supermarine Spitfire fighter on offensive sorties to France. It was around this time that he acted in the film The First of the Few, which starred David Niven and was filmed at Ibsley. On 8 November, Currant damaged a Bf 109. He was wounded on 9 March 1942 while on a Circus operation; engaged by three Focke-Wulf Fw 190 fighters, a bullet struck him in the head. He was able to evade his pursuers and make a crash landing at Lympne. After hospital treatment, he returned to duty the following month and, on 17 April, claimed a Bf 109 as probably destroyed.

In June 1942 Currant was promoted to wing commander and took command of the Ibsley Wing. The wing was mainly involved in operations over occupied France and the Low Countries. During his time at Ibsley he was awarded the Distinguished Service Order. The citation, published in The London Gazette, read:

Squadron Leader Currant is a most courageous pilot and brilliant leader. His untiring efforts and outstanding ability have been reflected in the splendid work accomplished by the squadron which he commands. One day in March, 1942, he was wounded in the head during a sortie. Despite this, he flew his aircraft safely back to base. Following a short enforced rest, he returned with renewed vigour. Squadron Leader Currant has destroyed at least 14 and damaged many more enemy aircraft.

— London Gazette, No. 35621, 7 July 1942

In February 1943 Currant was given command of No. 122 Wing of the Second Tactical Air Force. Based at Zeals, he led the wing on sorties to France, targeting transportation infrastructure. On account of one of the squadrons under his command including several Belgian pilots, he was awarded the Croix de Guerre by the Belgian government in exile on 9 April 1943. He was Mentioned in Despatches on 11 January 1944.

Currant's wing helped provide aerial cover for the landings at Normandy on 6 June. He was rested from operations soon afterwards and undertook a four-month lecturing tour in the United States. Upon his return he went to No. 84 Group Control Centre, where he was involved in the allocation of targets in support of tactical air operations. He was mentioned in despatches at the start of 1945. He ended the war credited with having shot down fifteen aircraft, five of which being shared with other pilots. He is also credited with the probable destruction of two more aircraft and damaging twelve aircraft.

== Postwar service ==
Currant chose to remain in the RAF after the war, being granted a permanent commission as a squadron leader although continuing in his acting rank. He took courses at the Joint Services Staff College and the RAF Staff College, following which he was sent to Washington, DC where he was on the staff of the Joint Chiefs of Staff for three years. He held an administrative role at the RAF station at Wattisham for two years and then served for 12 months as a staff officer in London at the Ministry of Supply. In 1955, he was sent to Norway as an instructor at the Royal Norwegian Air Force Staff College. His initial two-year term was extended for an additional two years at the request of the Norwegian government. He was subsequently awarded the Royal Norwegian Order of St Olav for "valuable services rendered by him as an adviser at the Royal Norwegian Air Force Staff College".

== Later life ==
Currant retired from the RAF in January 1959 whereafter he joined an engineering firm in Luton. His employers developed weapons for the RAF. He finally retired in 1976, settling in Somerset. Currant died at Taunton on 12 March 2006, survived by his wife Cynthia, whom he married in 1942, and the couple's four children.

== Bibliography ==
- Ashcroft, Michael (2012). Heroes of the Skies: Amazing True Stories of Courage in the Air. London, United Kingdom: Headline Publishing. ISBN 978-0-7553-6389-6.
- Rawlings, John (1976). Fighter Squadrons of the RAF and their Aircraft. London: MacDonald & James. ISBN 0-354-01028-X.
- Shores, Christopher; Williams, Clive (1994). Aces High: A Tribute to the Most Notable Fighter Pilots of the British and Commonwealth Forces in WWII. London: Grub Street. ISBN 1-8-9869-7000.
