= Wolfgang Lippert (pilot) =

World War II Luftwaffe Flying ace (1914–1941)

- Born: 14 September 1914; Fraureuth, Kingdom of Saxony
- Died: 3 December 1941 (aged 27); Egypt
- Military career
- Allegiance: Nazi Germany
- Branch: Luftwaffe
- Rank: Hauptmann (captain)
- Units: JG 53, JG 27
- Commands: 3./JG 53, II./JG 27
- Conflicts: Spanish Civil War; World War II: Battle of France; Battle of Britain; Operation Barbarossa; North African Campaign
- Awards: Spanish Cross In Gold with Swords; Knight's Cross of the Iron Cross

Wolfgang Lippert (14 September 1914 – 3 December 1941) was a World War II Luftwaffe Flying ace. Lippert was credited with 30 victories, five of which were scored in the Spanish Civil War.

== Early of life and career ==
Lippert was born on 14 September 1911 in Fraureuth of the Kingdom of Saxony within the German Empire. He joined the Luftwaffe and after pilot training, (Note: Flight training in the Luftwaffe progressed through the levels A1, A2 and B1, B2, referred to as A/B flight training. A training included theoretical and practical training in aerobatics, navigation, long-distance flights and dead-stick landings. The B courses included high-altitude flights, instrument flights, night landings and training to handle the aircraft in difficult situations.) was posted to I. Gruppe (1st group) of Jagdgeschwader 134 "Horst Wessel". Lippert gained his first aerial victories during the Spanish Civil War flying with the Condor Legion with 3. Staffel (3rd squadron) of Jagdgruppe 88. He claimed his first aerial victory on 15 July 1938 when he shot down a Polikarpov I-15 fighter. In total, he claimed five victories from mid-1938 until March 1939. For his service in Spain, he received the Spanish Cross in Gold with Swords (Spanienkreuz in Gold mit Schwertern) on 14 April 1939.

Following his return from Spain, Lippert was posted I. Gruppe of Jagdgeschwader 133 (JG 133—133rd Fighter Wing) based at Wiesbaden-Erbenheim Airfield. On 1 May 1939, the Gruppe was renamed and became the I. Gruppe of Jagdgeschwader 53 (JG 53—53rd Fighter Wing). That day, Lippert was appointed Staffelkapitän (squadron leader) of 3. Staffel of JG 53. He succeeded Hauptmann Lothar von Janson who was transferred.

== World War II ==
World War II in Europe began on Friday, 1 September 1939, when German forces invaded Poland. At the time, JG 53 was tasked with patrolling Germany's western border between Trier and Saarbrücken in what would be dubbed the "Phoney War" period of World War II. The Gruppe moved to an airfield at Kirchberg on 26 September. Four days later, Lippert claimed his first victory of World War II on 30 September 1939, a French Morane-Saulnier M.S.406 fighter. In December, I. Gruppe relocated to Darmstadt-Griesheim Airfield. Lippert claimed his second aerial victory on 7 April 1940, a Royal Air Force (RAF) Supermarine Spitfire. During the Battle of France he claimed six further Allied aircraft shot down.

On 16 August 1940 during the Battle of Britain, the Luftwaffe flew 399 bomber and 1,314 fighter sorties over Britain. That day, I. Gruppe participated on two missions to England, at 13:30 and 17:20. During the second mission, Lippert claimed a Spitfire shot down.

=== Group commander ===
II./JG 27 Emblem

On 4 September 1940, Hauptmann Lippert was appointed Gruppenkommandeur (group commander) of II. Gruppe of Jagdgeschwader 27 (JG 27—27th Fighter Wing). He thus succeeded Oberleutnant Ernst Düllberg who had temporarily replaced Hauptmann Werner Andres after his transfer. In consequence, command of 3. Staffel of JG 53 was given to Oberleutnant Julius Haase. On 7 September, II. Gruppe participated in Operation "Loge", 350 bombers escorted by 648 fighters, attacked various targets in the greater London area. The Gruppe protected those bombers returning from the docks in the East End of London. On this mission, Lippert claimed a Spitfire shot down at 19:05 near London, his first claim with JG 27.

On 24 September, II. Gruppe moved to Saint-Inglevert Airfield located northeast of Boulogne-sur-Mer near the English Channel. That day, Lippert was awarded the Knight's Cross of the Iron Cross (Ritterkreuz des Eisernen Kreuzes) after 13 World War II victories. Together with Oberleutnant Hans "Assi" Hahn, the presentation was made by Reichsmarschall Hermann Göring, the Commander-in-Chief of the Luftwaffe, at his residence Carinhall. On 1 November, he shot down RAF ace S/L Archie McKellar flying a No. 605 Squadron Hurricane Mk.I.

=== War against the Soviet Union ===
In preparation for Operation Barbarossa, the German invasion of the Soviet Union, II. Gruppe was moved to a makeshift airfield name Praszniki, located northeast of Suwałki close to the Curzon Line, on 18 June. On 22 June, the first day of the invasion, Lippert claimed a Soviet I-15 fighter shot down south of Knyszyn, and an I-17 fighter, an early Luftwaffe war designation for the Mikoyan-Gurevich MiG-1, northeast of Wizna. On 25 June, the Gruppe moved to an airfield at Vilnius. That day, Lippert claimed a Tupolev SB bomber north of Nemenčinė and an Ilyushin DB-3 bomber southwest of Vilnius. On 1 July, II. Gruppe was withdrawn from combat operations, all serviceable aircraft were transferred to III. Gruppe of JG 27 and the personnel was ordered to return to Suwałki, awaiting further orders.

=== North Africa and death ===
Following the withdrawal from the Eastern Front, II. Gruppe arrived at Döberitz, located approximately 10 kilometers (6.2 miles) west of Staaken, on 24 July. Here, the Gruppe was equipped with the Bf 109 F-4 and prepared for combat in North Africa to support a German contingent, the Deutsche Afrika Korps under the command of Erwin Rommel. On 29 September, the Gruppenstab (headquarters unit) under command of Lippert began the relocation to Ayn al-Ġazāla where they were subordinated to the Fliegerführer Afrika, Generalmajor Stefan Fröhlich. Lipper claimed his first aerial victory in the North African theatre on 23 October. Lippert led a flight of six Bf 109s on a mission which intercepted a flight of Hurricane fighters of the South African Air Force (SAAF) 1 Squadron which lost two Hurricanes, one of which claimed by Lippert in the area south of Buq Buq.

On 23 November, five days after British forces had launched Operation Crusader, Lippert was shot down over Allied lines near Bir el Gubi, probably by Flight Lieutenant Clive Caldwell of No. 250 Squadron. As Lippert bailed out of his Bf 109 F-4 (Werknummer 8469—factory number), he hit the tailplane. He was hospitalised in Cairo and his legs were amputated. However, his legs were infected by gangrene and he died on 3 December. He is buried at the Fayid War Cemetery (Plot 29, Row D, Grave 22). In consequence, command of II. Gruppe was temporarily given to Oberleutnant Gustav Rödel before Hauptmann Erich Gerlitz took command on 25 December.

== Summary of career ==
=== Aerial victory claims ===
Mathews and Foreman, authors of Luftwaffe Aces — Biographies and Victory Claims, researched the German Federal Archives and found records for 29 aerial victory claims, plus one further unconfirmed claim. This number includes five claims during the Spanish Civil War, three on the Eastern Front and further 21 over the Western Allies of World War II.

Chronicle of aerial victories
This and the ? (question mark) indicates information discrepancies listed by Prien, Stemmer, Rodeike, Bock, Mathews and Foreman.
Claim	Date	Time	Type	Location	Claim	Date	Time	Type	Location
Spanish Civil War
– 3. Staffel of Jagdgruppe 88 – Spanish Civil War — July – December 1938
1	15 July 1938	—	I-15		4	4 October 1938	—	I-16	
2	23 July 1938	—	I-16		5	29 December 1938	—	I-15	
3	14 August 1938	—	I-16						
World War II
– 3. Staffel of Jagdgeschwader 53 – "Phoney War" — 1 September 1939 – 9 May 1940
1	30 September 1939	14:45	M.S.406	Büdingen	2	7 April 1940	12:50	Spitfire	southwest of Diedenhofen
– 3. Staffel of Jagdgeschwader 53 – Battle of France — 10 May – 25 June 1940
3	10 May 1940	13:55	Curtiss	southwest of Metz	6	20 May 1940	18:35	Curtiss	Noyon
4	14 May 1940	19:30	Wellington	Sedan	7	3 June 1940	14:20	Spitfire	south of Paris
5	15 May 1940	16:13	MB.151	south of Charleville	8	9 June 1940	14:50	Curtiss	Boult
– 3. Staffel of Jagdgeschwader 53 – At the Channel and over England — 26 June – 3 September 1940
9	16 August 1940	18:00	Spitfire		11	2 September 1940	08:55	Hurricane	
10	26 August 1940	17:35	Spitfire	Portsmouth					
– Stab II. Gruppe of Jagdgeschwader 27 – At the Channel and over England — 4 September – 5 November 1940
12	7 September 1940	19:05	Spitfire	London	15	25 October 1940	13:06	Hurricane	London
13	17 September 1940	16:48	Hurricane	Maidstone	16	1 November 1940	09:15	Hurricane	Canterbury
14	25 October 1940	13:05	Hurricane	London					
– Stab II. Gruppe of Jagdgeschwader 27 – Operation Barbarossa – 22 June – 19 July 1941
17	22 June 1941	04:15	I-15	south of Knyszyn	19? (Note: According to Mathews and Foreman this claim is unconfirmed.)	25 June 1941	—	SB-3	north of Nemenčinė
18	22 June 1941	04:18	I-17 (MiG-1)	northeast of Wizna	20	25 June 1941	12:15	DB-3	southwest of Vilnius
– Stab II. Gruppe of Jagdgeschwader 27 – In North Africa — 22 September – 23 November 1941
21	23 October 1941	09:30	Hurricane	south of Buq Buq	24	22 November 1941	16:45	Wellington	northwest of Bir Hacheim
22	22 November 1941	10:20	P-40	southeast of Ain el Gazala airfield	25	23 November 1941	12:25	Hurricane	east of Bir Hacheim
23	22 November 1941	16:30	P-40	northwest of Bir Hacheim					

=== Awards ===
- Spanish Cross in Gold with Swords (14 April 1939)
- Iron Cross (1939) 2nd and 1st Class
- Knight's Cross of the Iron Cross on 24 September 1940 as Hauptmann and Gruppenkommandeur of the II./Jagdgeschwader 27
