= The First of the Few =

1942 film by Leslie Howard

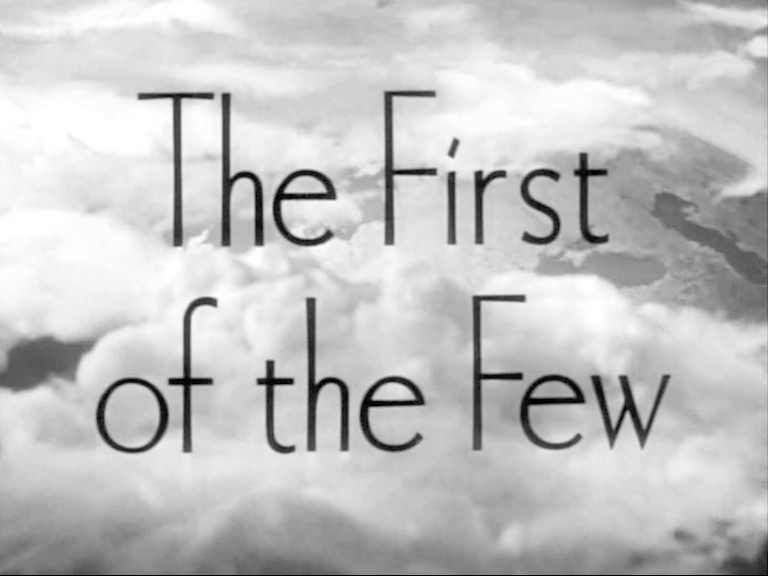
- Title frame
- Directed by: Leslie Howard
- Screenplay by: Miles Malleson; Anatole de Grunwald
- Story by: Henry C. James; Kay Strueby
- Produced by: Leslie Howard; George King; John Stafford
- Starring: Leslie Howard; David Niven
- Cinematography: Georges Périnal
- Edited by: Douglas Myers
- Music by: William Walton
- Distributed by: General Film Distributors (UK); RKO Radio Pictures Inc. (USA)
- Release dates: 14 September 1942; 20 August 1942 (Leicester Square Theatre, London)
- Running time: 118 minutes (UK); 90 minutes (USA)
- Country: United Kingdom
- Languages: English; Italian; German

The First of the Few (US title Spitfire) is a 1942 British black-and-white biographical film that was produced and directed by Leslie Howard, who stars as R. J. Mitchell, the designer of the Supermarine Spitfire fighter aircraft.

David Niven co-stars as a Royal Air Force officer and test pilot, a composite character who represents the pilots who flew Mitchell's seaplanes and tested the Spitfire. The film depicts Mitchell's strong work ethic in designing the Spitfire and his death. The film's title alludes to Winston Churchill's speech describing Battle of Britain aircrew, subsequently known as the Few: "Never was so much owed by so many to so few".

The film premiered at the Leicester Square Theatre in London at 6.30pm on Thurs 30 August 1942, as a charity performance in aid of the RAF Benevolent Fund.

Leslie Howard's portrayal of Mitchell has a special significance since Howard was killed when the Lisbon-to-London civilian airliner in which he was travelling was shot down by the Luftwaffe on 1 June 1943. His death occurred only days before The First of the Few was released in the United States on 12 June 1943, under the alternative title of Spitfire.

== Plot ==
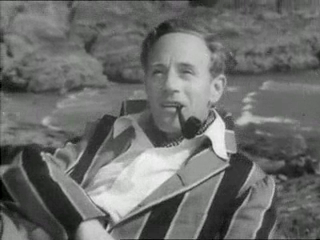
Leslie Howard in The First of the Few

A newsreel sets the scene for summer 1940, showing Nazi advances in Europe with Britain facing invasion and aerial attacks on the island increasing. On 15 September 1940, during the Battle of Britain, RAF Squadron Leader Geoffrey Crisp, the commander of a Spitfire squadron, recounts the story of how his friend R. J. Mitchell designed the Spitfire fighter.

His pilots listen as Crisp begins with the 1922 Schneider Trophy competition, where Mitchell began his most important work, designing high speed aircraft. While watching seabirds with his binoculars, he envisages a new shape for aircraft in the future. Crisp, an ex-First World War pilot seeking work, captivates Mitchell with his enthusiasm and the designer promises to hire him as a test pilot should his design ever go into production. Facing opposition from official sources, Mitchell succeeds in creating a series of highly successful seaplane racers, eventually winning the Schneider Trophy outright for Great Britain.

After a visit to Germany in the 1930s, a chance meeting with leading German aircraft designer Willy Messerschmitt, and hearing talk of German re-armament, Mitchell resolves to build the fastest and deadliest fighter aircraft. Convincing Henry Royce of Rolls-Royce that a new engine, eventually to become the Merlin, is needed, Mitchell gets the powerplant he requires.

Faced by the devastating news that he has only one year to live and battling against failing health, Mitchell dies just after hearing word that the government has ordered the Spitfire into production. Crisp ends his account when the squadron is scrambled to counter a German attack. The Germans are beaten, with the Luftwaffe losing more planes than the British.

In the end, Crisp is relieved with victory and looks to the clouds to Mitchell, voicing a thanks to him for creating the Spitfire. A single aeroplane ascends towards the sun, followed later by three others.

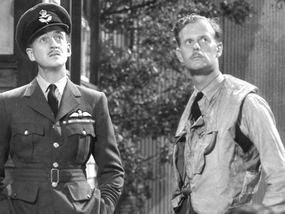
David Niven and Bunny Currant in The First of the Few

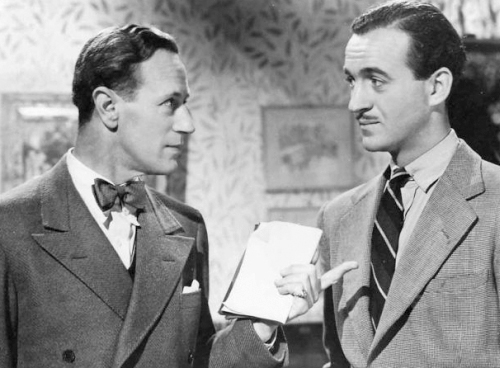
Leslie Howard and David Niven

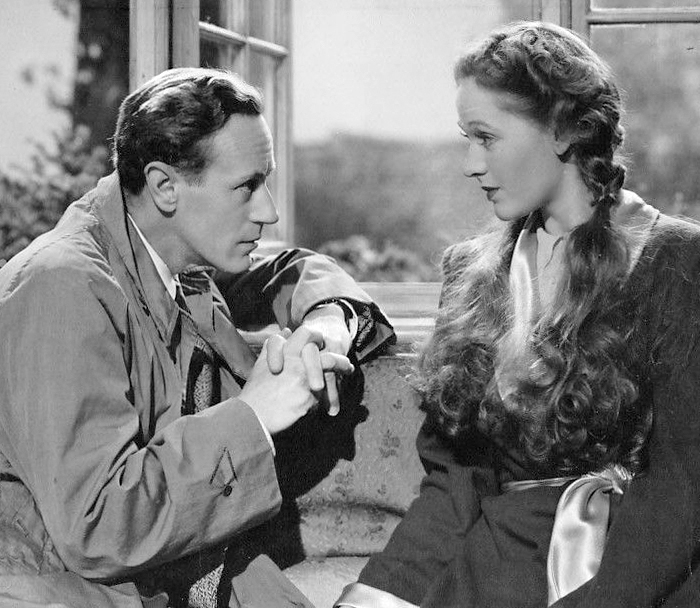
Leslie Howard and Rosamund John

== Cast ==
- Leslie Howard as R. J. Mitchell
- David Niven as Geoffrey Crisp
- Rosamund John as Diana Mitchell
- Roland Culver as Commander Bride
- Anne Firth as Miss Harper
- David Horne as Mr Higgins
- Derrick De Marney as Squadron Leader Jefferson
- Rosalyn Boulter as Mabel Lovesay
- Toni Edgar-Bruce as Lady Houston
- Gordon McLeod as Major Buchan
- George Skillan as Mr Royce
- Fritz Wendhausen as Von Straben
- John Chandos as Krantz
- Victor Beaumont as Von Crantz
- Filippo Del Giudice as Bertorelli
- Brefni O'Rorke as the specialist
- Peter Gawthorne as board member (uncredited)
- Miles Malleson as Vickers representative (uncredited)
- Bernard Miles as Lady Houston's messenger (uncredited)
- Cyril Raymond as radio control officer (uncredited)
- Patricia Medina as Italian girl (uncredited)

== Production ==
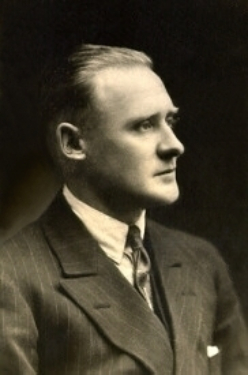
R. J. Mitchell, subject of the biopic

The First of the Few is a British film produced and directed by Leslie Howard, with Howard taking the starring role of aviation engineer and designer R. J. Mitchell. Leslie Howard bore little resemblance to R. J. Mitchell, however, as Mitchell was a large and athletic man. Howard portrayed Mitchell as upper class and mild-mannered. Mitchell – "the Guv'nor" – was in fact working class and had an explosive temper; apprentices were told to watch the colour of his neck and to run if it turned red. Howard himself was well aware of these deliberate artistic discrepancies, and dealt delicately with the family and Mitchell's colleagues; Mrs. Mitchell and her son Gordon were on the set during much of the production. When told that the "authorities" had come up with the name "Spitfire", Mitchell is reported to have said "Just the sort of bloody silly name they would think of".

As The First of the Few was a Second World War propaganda film, the RAF contributed Spitfire fighters for the production. U.S. producer Samuel Goldwyn allowed Niven to appear in exchange for U.S. rights to the film, which was distributed by RKO Pictures. After seeing the prints, Goldwyn was furious that Niven was cast in a secondary role and personally edited out 40 minutes before reissuing the film as Spitfire.

Wing Commander Bunny Currant ("Hunter Leader") Squadron Leader Tony Bartley, Squadron Leader Brian Kingcome, Flying Officer David Fulford, Flight Lieutenant 'Jock' Gillan, Squadron Leader P. J. Howard-Williams and Flight Lieutenant J. C. 'Robbie' Robson are among the pilots and RAF Fighter Command personnel who make uncredited appearances. Some pilots seen in the early sequences did not survive to see the completed film. Jeffrey Quill is the test pilot who flies the Spitfire prototype in the scene demonstrating its ability to climb to 10,000 feet and dive at more than 500 miles per hour.

== Soundtrack ==
The film's score was composed by William Walton, who later incorporated major cues into a concert work known as Spitfire Prelude and Fugue.

== Release ==
The First of the Few was received well by audiences on both sides of the Atlantic. According to Kinematograph Weekly it was the most popular British film of 1942 in Britain.

== Reception ==
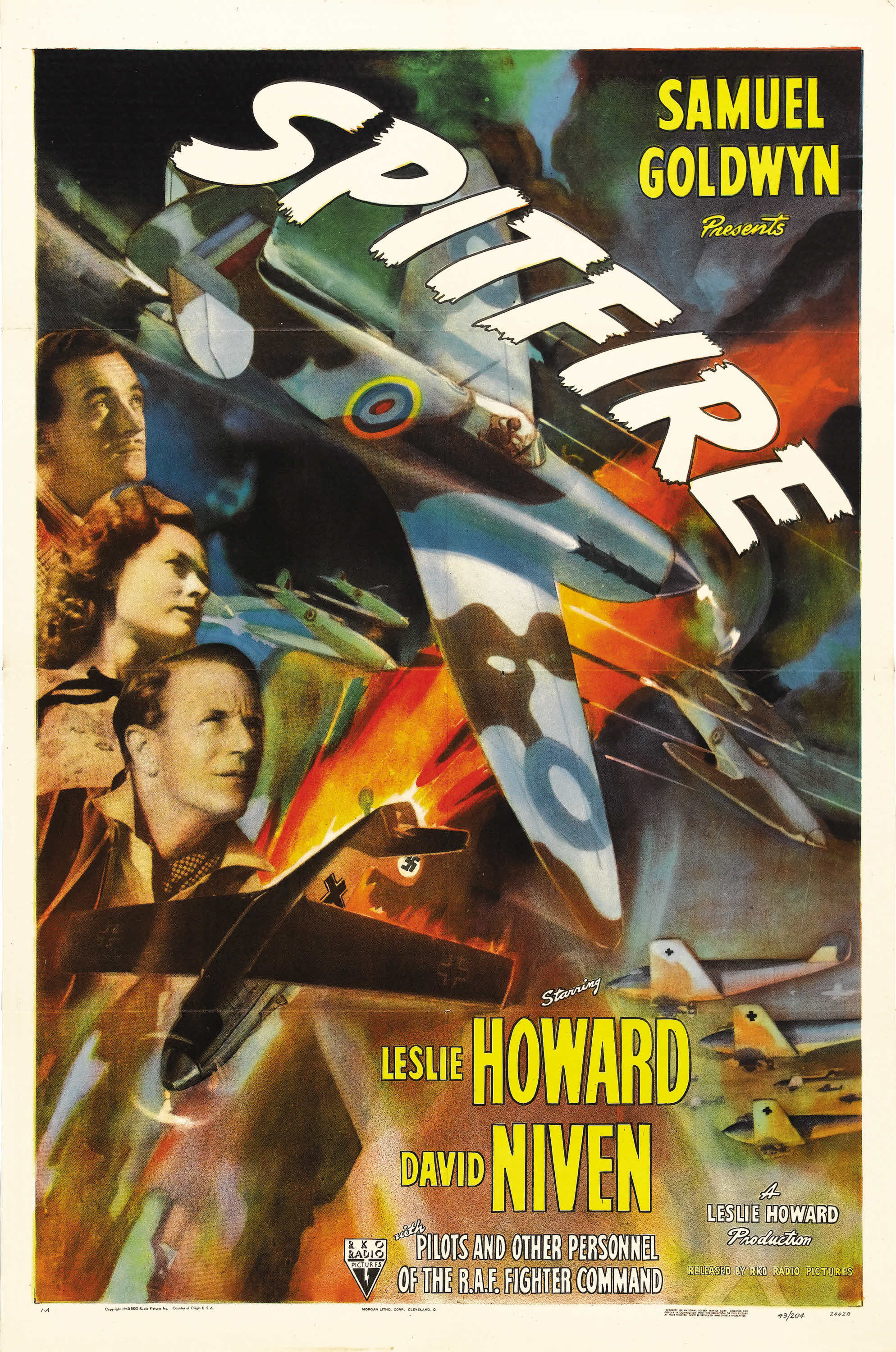
Poster for the U.S. release version, Spitfire

The Sunday Times reported that "the film is full of action, Schneider Trophy races, test flying and flashes from the Battle of Britain with which, pointing its moral, it begins and ends." Niven was credited for "one of his best performances up to now." S. P MacKenzie wrote of the film's reception in Britain that "virtually every section of the popular and trade press was bowled over by First of the Few."

"Production, performances and story—they can't miss," wrote Variety after an August 1942 screening in London. "In interpreting the life of R. J. Mitchell, who designed the Spitfire plane, Leslie Howard's work ranks among his finest performances. And it is an epic picture."

"It was backed by the RAF and intended to inspire the nation at a time of crisis," wrote journalist and author Gerard Garrett. "Films, or anything else, made with such intentions rarely survive their hour. But The First of the Few, though a trifle stolid to modern eyes, was an excellent example of how British film makers, provided with realistic subjects, rose to the challenge. Film critics like everyone else are not immune to events, but their respectful reception of this film seems in retrospect to have been fully merited."

Leslie Howard's portrayal of Mitchell has a special significance since Howard was killed when the BOAC Flight 777 Douglas DC-3 airliner in which he was a passenger was shot down by the Luftwaffe one year after the film was released.

When the film reached US screens in June 1943, Bosley Crowther of The New York Times pronounced it "but a fair motion picture [with] moments of almost tedious restraint." But Crowther wrote that its most moving effect was the place it would hold as Howard's last film. "It was a truly uncanny coincidence that Spitfire should have opened here just a few days after it was reported that Leslie Howard, its star and producer, had been lost at sea. It was weird and justly poetic and the loss of Mr Howard was thereby brought more poignantly home because this film, which is a quiet memorial to the designer of the famous British plane, might suitably do the same service, in the eyes of Americans, to its star." Crowther continued:

For Mr Howard's R. J. Mitchell in Spitfire is mostly Mr Howard—or the character he has often played in pictures and which we have often admired—the studious, retiring fellow of a certain melancholy turn of mind which was sweetened by a quiet sense of humor and a deep-rooted self-respect. … And now, to see him in Spitfire seems almost too relevant for chance. For Mr Howard's parting as Mitchell is too much like his own exit into the blue. The final fadeout of the picture on planes winging toward the clouds is prophetic. … And if he had consciously designed it, he could not have given himself a more appropriate leave.

Among modern critics, Leslie Halliwell wrote that the film is a "low-key but impressive biopic with firm acting and good dialogue scenes. Production values slightly shaky." AllMovie noted that the film "gets the essentials correct, and is surprisingly suspenseful for a bio-pic of this type". Leonard Maltin gave the film three out of four stars, and called it a "good biographical drama".

== Historical accuracy ==
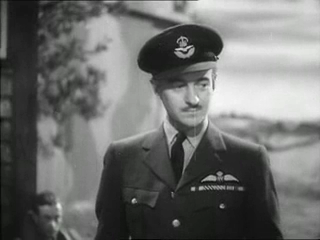
David Niven as Geoffrey Crisp

Screencapture from The First of the Few, showing the Supermarine S.5 racer

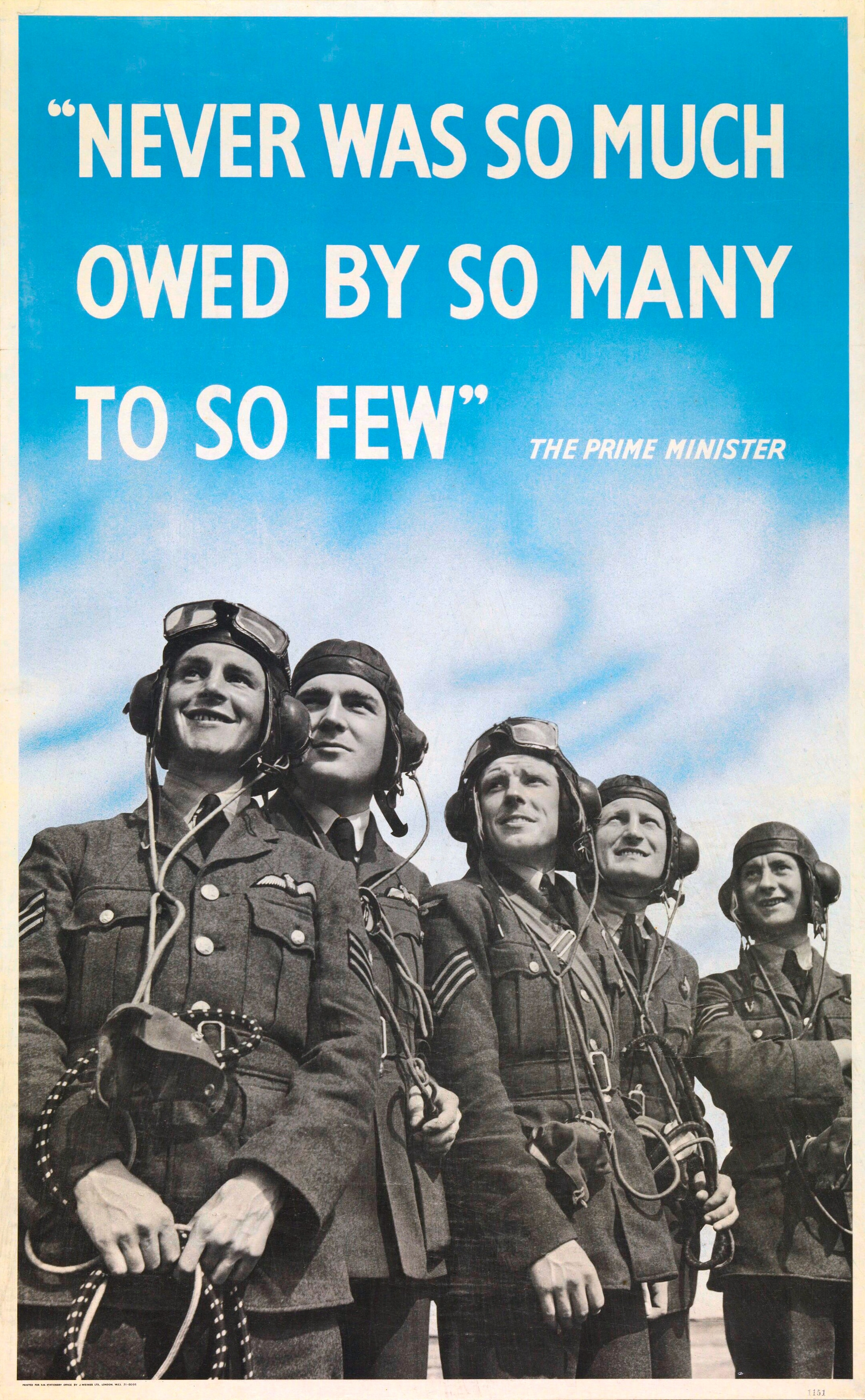
World War II poster featuring the famous quotation by Winston Churchill

Geoffrey Crisp is a fictional character who is an amalgam of Vickers's test pilots, Jeffrey Quill (also an RAF veteran) and "Mutt" Summers. Having one character personify the test pilots is a liberty that gives the story narrative coherence, as well as a narrator and occasional comic relief. The character embodies all those who gave Mitchell encouragement in the face of bureaucratic opposition. The Observer wrote, "Oddly enough, since Mitchell was a real man and Crisp is merely a symposium of test pilots, an imaginary creation, it is Mitchell who seems the figment, Crisp the flesh-and-blood character. David Niven's flippant assurance is just right here. The real-life story is the more real for his imagined presence; he gives the rather abstracted film a body."

Mitchell's fatal illness is deliberately not specified in the film. Through dramatic licence, it is implied that a period of rest could have saved or at least extended his life. In fact, Mitchell had bowel or rectal cancer, which he battled for four years. In 1933 he underwent a colostomy and he was ill, often seriously ill, for the remainder of his life. Following surgery in February 1937 he spent a month at a clinic in Vienna, but his cancer was too advanced for the treatment to be effective. Mitchell returned home and, as in the film, spent his last conscious hours in his garden. He died on 11 June 1937, aged 42.

The First of the Few contains several historical inaccuracies:

- Mitchell did not work himself to death on the Spitfire. He did, however, continue to work despite the pain of his illness, tweaking and perfecting the Spitfire design up until his death.
- The famous Rolls-Royce Merlin engine was named after a bird of prey, following the Rolls-Royce convention adopted for its piston aircraft engine designs. It was not named after the wizard of Arthurian legend, as depicted in the film.
- It is believed that Mitchell visited Germany while convalescing from his 1933 surgery, but he never met aircraft designer Willy Messerschmitt.

The film contains historically significant footage that would otherwise have been lost to posterity:

- Film footage of the Supermarine S.4 taking off from Southampton Water, and in flight, now available nowhere else.
- Footage of many real-life Battle of Britain fighter pilots in the opening and closing scenes. RAF fighter pilots such as Tony Bartley and Brian Kingcome (with pipe) have cameo roles in the scenes at the dispersal, and are seen discussing their flights with David Niven before takeoff and after landing.
- Film footage of Jeffrey Quill flying a Spitfire Mk II in the final scenes of the film. Jeffrey Quill's log book records that the aerobatic flying sequences featured in the last 20 minutes of the film were made by him from Northolt on 1–2 November 1941, in a Spitfire Mk II, flying for one hour, five minutes on 1 November and for 45 minutes on 2 November 1941.
- The workers seen building the Spitfire, near the end of the film. These are the real workers, filmed at the Hamble Supermarine Factory, one being Wilfred Hillier (wearing spectacles), working on the only left handed lathe, imported from Germany.
