= Archie McKellar =

British flying ace

Archibald Ashmore McKellar
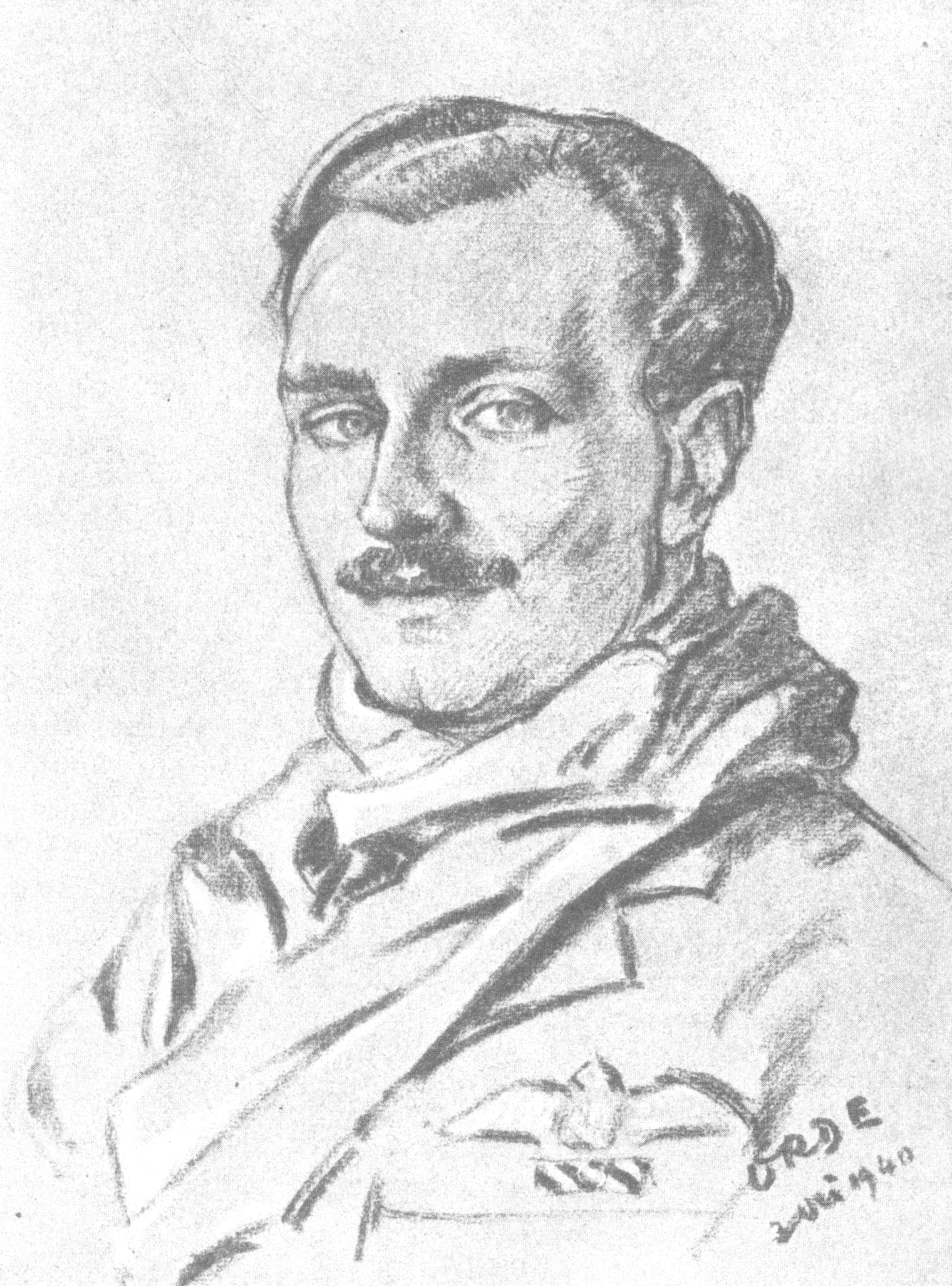
- Archie McKellar in October 1940
- Born: 10 April 1912; Paisley, Renfrewshire, Scotland
- Died: 1 November 1940 (aged 28) near Adisham, Kent, England
- Military career
- Allegiance: United Kingdom
- Branch: Royal Air Force
- Service years: 1936–1940
- Rank: Squadron Leader
- Nickname: "Archie"
- Conflicts: Second World War: Battle of Britain †
- Awards: Distinguished Service Order; Distinguished Flying Cross & Bar; Mentioned in Despatches

Squadron Leader Archibald Ashmore McKellar, DSO, DFC & Bar (10 April 1912 – 1 November 1940) was a flying ace of the Royal Air Force (RAF) during the Second World War.

McKellar grew up and joined the family business in his native Scotland, but in 1936, aged 24, he joined the RAF and began pilot training. He completed his training in 1938 and was assigned to No. 602 (City of Glasgow) Squadron RAF, an Auxiliary Unit. In 1939 he converted to the Supermarine Spitfire fighter. He experienced his first combat with No. 602 Squadron, credited with two victories soon after the outbreak of war in 1939 against German bombers attacking Royal Navy ships and installations over northern Britain during the "Phoney War" period. McKellar's first victory earned him the distinction of being the first pilot to shoot down a German aircraft over the British Isles during the war.

A year later, he gained fame in 1940 during the Battle of Britain as a part of, and later squadron leader of, No. 605 Squadron RAF, equipped with the Hawker Hurricane fighter. The Auxiliary Unit was moved to southern England and participated in the large air battles. McKellar's combat career proved to be very brief, lasting just over a year. He claimed all but two of his victories within the last two and a half months of his life; 15 August – 1 November 1940. On 7 October 1940 he shot down five Messerschmitt Bf 109s, thus becoming an ace in a day; one of only 24 Allied aces to achieve the feat. At the time of his last mission he had claimed 21 aerial victories and another two shared destroyed against enemy aircraft. Included in this total of 21 air victories are 11 Bf 109s. McKellar, along with Ronald Hamlyn and Brian Carbury, were the only British pilots to achieve the feat of "Ace in a Day" during the Battle of Britain.

On 1 November 1940, one day after the official end of the Battle of Britain, he was killed in action. He took off and engaged a formation of German fighters, one of which he possibly shot down for his 22nd, albeit uncredited, and final victory. McKellar was then shot down himself.

== Early life ==
Archibald Ashmore ("Archie") McKellar was born in Paisley, Renfrewshire, Scotland, on 10 April 1912, the son of John and Margaret McKellar, of Bearsden, Dunbartonshire, and was then educated at Shawlands Academy in the Southside of Glasgow. Upon leaving school he joined a local stockbroker's firm. This did not suit McKellar, who preferred an open–air life style. Keen to leave, but unsure of what direction to take in life, he joined his father's general contractor and construction business as a plasterer. He spent five years as an apprentice plasterer. During this time he was given no special privileges despite being the boss' son.

McKellar was also a keen fitness enthusiast and, despite his short stature, built up a great physical strength. Though he enjoyed wine and smoked the occasional pipe or cigar he kept in peak physical shape until his death. Even at the height of the Battle of Britain he was always clean shaven and immaculately dressed. McKellar's spare time was used reading about sport and First World War fighter pilots. His interest in the flying personalities of the past spurred him to take up flying. He joined at his own expense the Scottish Flying Club, which had been founded in 1927; it leased and managed Renfrew Airport from 1933 until it was requisitioned during the Second World War. McKellar quickly acquired a pilot's licence. By the time he began his military career, McKellar was a very experienced pilot, and he soon began earning relatively quick promotions.

== Joining the AAF and RAF ==
His flying skills earned him the attention of Lord Clydesdale, commanding officer of No. 602 Squadron AAF. Clydesdale invited McKellar to join the Auxiliary Air Force (AAF) and was soon commissioned into the RAF as a pilot officer on 8 November 1936, joining No. 602 (City of Glasgow) Squadron RAF. McKellar's comrades affectionately nicknamed him "Shrimp" owing to his short, 5 feet 3 inches (1.60 m), stature. McKellar stayed with the Squadron and on 8 May 1938 was promoted to flying officer.

Based at RAF Abbotsinch near Paisley, the squadron operated the Hawker Hind light bomber. The members of squadron—both pilots and ground staff—were reservists and completed their service on a part-time basis, in the evenings, weekends and an annual two–week summer camp. With the approach of war, the squadron converted to a fighter role and re-equipped with the Supermarine Spitfire. It mobilised on the outbreak of war at RAF Grangemouth on 6 October 1939 and then to RAF Drem a month later, charged with defending Edinburgh and the shipping area around the Firth of Forth.

Upon completing training McKellar was deemed to have exceptional eyesight which earned him a reputation as a good marksman in air-to-air combat. Yet, paradoxically, when shooting with his rifle he was a well below average shot—a trait he shared with some other successful pilots. MacKellar was a keen sportsman. He believed physical fitness was a critical attribute in aerial combat; fitness, he believed, would ensure that the mind and body were always at their peak of alertness, and enable a pilot to react swiftly within a fluid battle situation.

McKellar was also considered a capable leader in combat. Aggressive and instinctive, his fighting spirit was an inspiration to his squadron but according to one biographer, he was highly strung, vociferous and blunt with members of his unit. Nevertheless, his directness and socially confident nature singled him out for command. His dedication to his job as a fighter pilot and leader led him to refuse any leave from his Squadron while the Battle of Britain lasted. Invariably McKellar led from the front of his unit. He spent a large proportion of his time with his squadron practising combat tactics. While intensely loyal to anyone he considered a friend, McKellar's attitude to others outside the squadron was either of utmost friendliness or utter dislike. He is said to have tended to see everything and everyone in black and white.

== Second World War ==
=== 602 Squadron ===
On 16 October 1939, the Luftwaffe made its first attack on target in Great Britain. I./Kampfgeschwader 30 (KG 30—Bomber Wing 30) targeted Royal Navy ships in the Firth of Forth. The target was HMS Hood. However, she was in dry dock and the cruiser HMS Southampton and destroyer HMS Mohawk were attacked. Though none of the bombs that struck exploded Mohawk's commander was killed. Spitfires from 603 Squadron joined 602 Squadron, The Queen's "City of Glasgow" Squadron, in intercepting the raid. During one attack, the cockpit canopy of Hauptmann Helmut Pohl's Junkers Ju 88 released itself. Pohl was an experienced test pilot and Gruppenkommandeur (Group Commander) of KG 30. He had helped develop the Ju 88 and had taken part in the invasion of Poland. Pohl tried to fly northwards to take an observation position, but the aircraft was hit by the fire of Spitfires piloted by George Pinkerton and McKellar. The Ju 88 crashed into the sea, Pohl being the only survivor of his crew. The victory was credited to McKellar. Thus, McKellar is officially credited with the downing the first enemy aircraft to fall in British waters during the war.

Following the 16 October success, Commander-in-Chief of Fighter Command, Air Marshal Hugh Dowding sent word to 602 Squadron; "Well done, first blood to the auxiliaries." This area around Firth of Forth became nicknamed "suicide alley" by Luftwaffe pilots.

On 28 October 1939 McKellar intercepted a Heinkel He 111H-2 of Stab./Kampfgeschwader 26 (KG 26—Bomber Wing 26), code 1H+JA piloted by Unteroffizier Lehmkuhl. Acting on the advice of his navigator Leutnant Niehoff, he dropped down towards cloud layers. The cover, however, quickly dispersed. Their gunners were killed, Lehmkul was hit in the back by machine gun fire and was wounded while Niehoff suffered a fractured spine during the crash-landing. Debate continues as to which squadron or pilot was the victor. Post–war sources credit the victory to McKellar. It was also the War's first German aircraft shot down onto British soil.

=== 605 Squadron ===
In early 1940, 605 Squadron moved to RAF Drem, as they converted to Hurricanes. McKellar was transferred to No. 605 and promoted to flight lieutenant, assuming the responsibilities of a flight leader on 21 June 1940. McKellar imposed strict discipline, both in standard of dress on the ground and in tactical discipline in the air. Despite his strict methods McKellar was held in high regard. His popularity arose from his desire to help mould his unit into a well-disciplined fighting team.

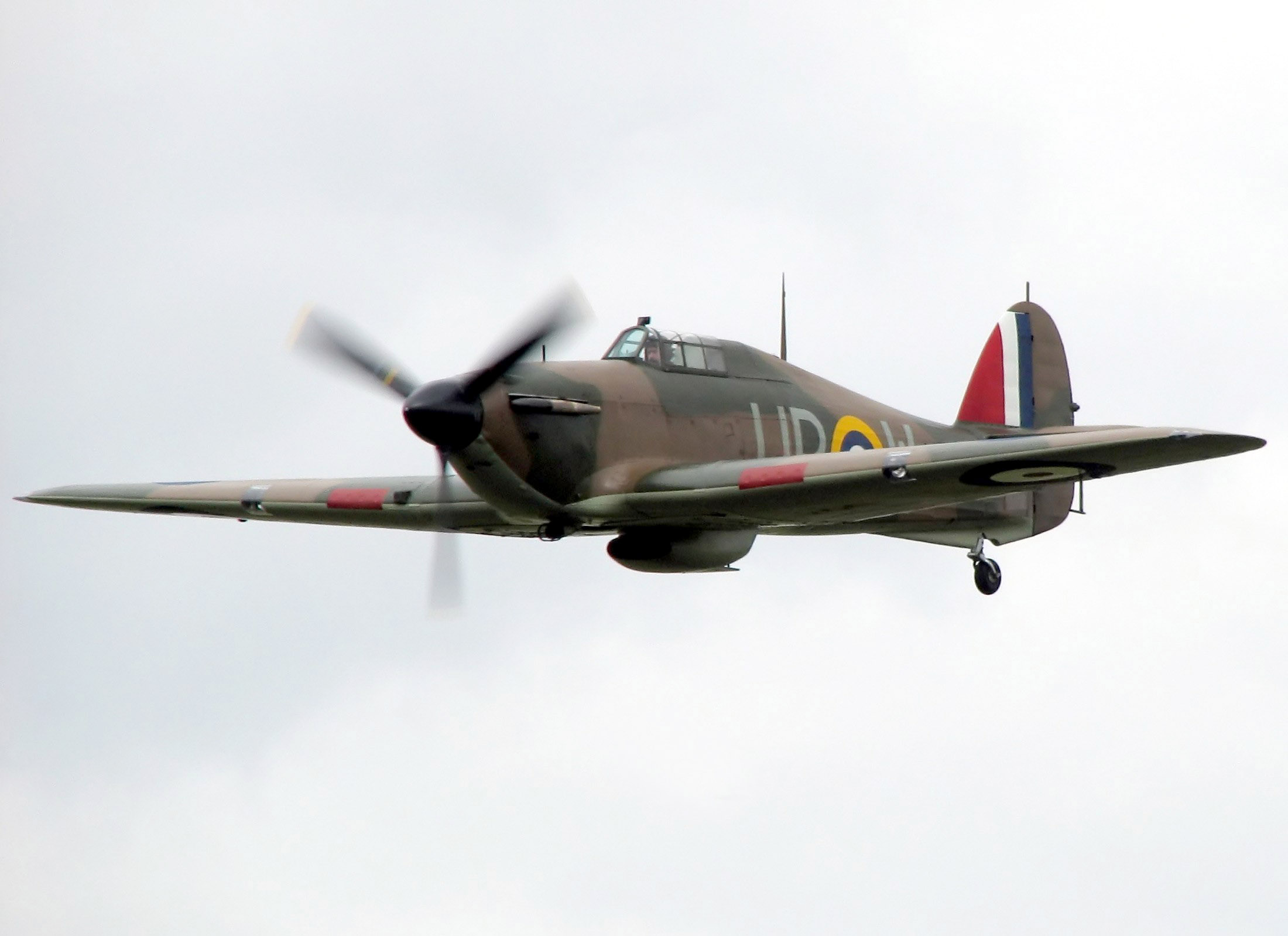
Hawker Hurricane I R4118 of No 605 Squadron, flown by Bob Foster, McKellar's Squadron comrade who also flew on McKellar's last mission.

On 15 August 1940 No. 605 intercepted a German raid against Tyneside mounted by He 111s based in Norway with Luftflotte 5 (Air Fleet 5). McKellar was credited with three He 111s destroyed during the encounter. For this action he was awarded the Distinguished Flying Cross (DFC) and was gazetted on 13 September 1940 and made reference to the "outstanding leadership and courage" displayed by McKellar.

On 7 September 1940, No. 605 moved on rotation to Croydon Aerodrome under the command of Squadron Leader Walter Churchill. McKellar scored a further four victories in a single mission on 9 September. McKellar attacked with the sun at his back with his squadron, save for one section which was left to provide top cover against Bf 109s. The attack was made head-on to break up the German bomber formation which consisted of a large mass of He 111s. He destroyed three He 111s with a single, 12–second burst. The first He 111 exploded. It damaged a second which rolled over and dived down into the ground. McKellar then moved his fire to a third. Its port wing snapped off. He then destroyed a Bf 109 in the afternoon giving him a fourth success.

McKellar took over from Squadron Leader Churchill on 11 September. He achieved a further three victories 15 September. The raids were made in large formation leading the fighting that day to be christened the Battle of Britain Day. McKellar led 605 into combat twice on that date claiming two Bf 109s and a Do 17. That night, at an hour past midnight, 16 September, he claimed another He 111 shot down. A Medal bar to the DFC followed which cited his "excellent fighting spirit ... particularly brilliant tactician, and has led his Squadron with skill and resource".

On 3 October McKellar became one of the select few pilots of Fighter Command to sit for one of Cuthbert Orde's charcoal portraits. On 7 October his score rose by five victories, all Bf 109s, becoming an Ace in a day. McKellar explained three of the five victories in the combat that day in his combat report;

I attacked the Number One and saw a bomb being dropped from this machine. I fired and pieces fell off his wing and dense white smoke and vapour came from him and he went into a violent outside spin. In my mirror I could see another '109 coming to attack me and therefore turned sharply right and found myself behind another '109. I opened fire and saw my De Wilde (explosive ammunition) hitting his machine. It burst into flames and went down inverted east of Biggin Hill. As I again had a '109 on my tail I spiralled down to 15,000 feet and by this time there appeared to be '109s straggling all over the sky. I followed one, pulled my boost control and made up on him. I gave him a burst from dead astern and at once his radiator appeared to be hit as dense white vapour came back at me and my windscreen fogged up. This speedily cleared and I gave him another burst and this machine burst into flames and fell into a wood with a quarry near it, west of Maidstone.

Thirteen days later, on 20 October 1940, McKellar brought down another Bf 109. Its pilot, Feldwebel Adolf Iburg from 9. Staffel Jagdgeschwader 54 (JG 54—Fighter Wing 54), was slightly wounded in action. Iburg managed to force–land near New Romney and was captured. The victory was credited to him in a post-war account, but there is no official accreditation of the Iburg victory to McKellar by the RAF, though he was credited with another Bf 109 victory on that date.

=== Death ===
By 1 November 1940 McKellar had claimed 21 victories. Taking a section of No. 605 that included Flight Lieutenant Bob Foster, up to meet a flight of Bf 109 Jabos (Bf 109s equipped with bombs). The section climbed to high altitude to meet the enemy aircraft. In the ensuing battle it is believed McKellar was shot down by II./Jagdgeschwader 27 Hauptmann Wolfgang Lippert. McKellar's Hurricane MkI (V6879) crashed at the side of Woodlands Manor near Adisham, Kent at 18:20hrs.

On 8 November 1940 his actions brought a final award: the Distinguished Service Order (DSO). His DSO was gazetted posthumously on 26 November 1940 and again cited both 'outstanding courage and determination' in leading his squadron. Further recognition came in a Mention in Despatches gazetted on 31 December 1940.

On 16 January 1941 Sir Archibald Sinclair, Secretary of State for Air, visited Glasgow to deliver the eulogy;

Not long ago I visited a fighter squadron which was taking part during the dark days in the battle of this island. That squadron lost its leader in an air fight—and they felt the loss. He had been wounded in combat and had been withdrawn from service. I found in his place, taking to the air with daring resolve, proving himself a leader amongst leaders, a young Scot. His name was Archie McKellar. He had come from the City of Glasgow Squadron to lift up this squadron in its dark hour and to carry it on to fresh victories and achievement by his spirit. It was quite apparent to me that he had the whole squadron with him. He was regarded with the greatest admiration and affection by his officers. I will never forget the impression he made upon me when I saw him.

As McKellar died outside the Air Ministry's nominal dates for the Battle of Britain (10 July—31 October 1940), he is not listed on the Battle of Britain roll of honour at The RAF Chapel, Westminster Abbey. McKellar is buried at New Eastwood Cemetery, Thornliebank, East Renfrewshire, by Glasgow. McKellar Close in Bushey is named in his honour, one of a number of streets in the area named after Battle of Britain pilots.

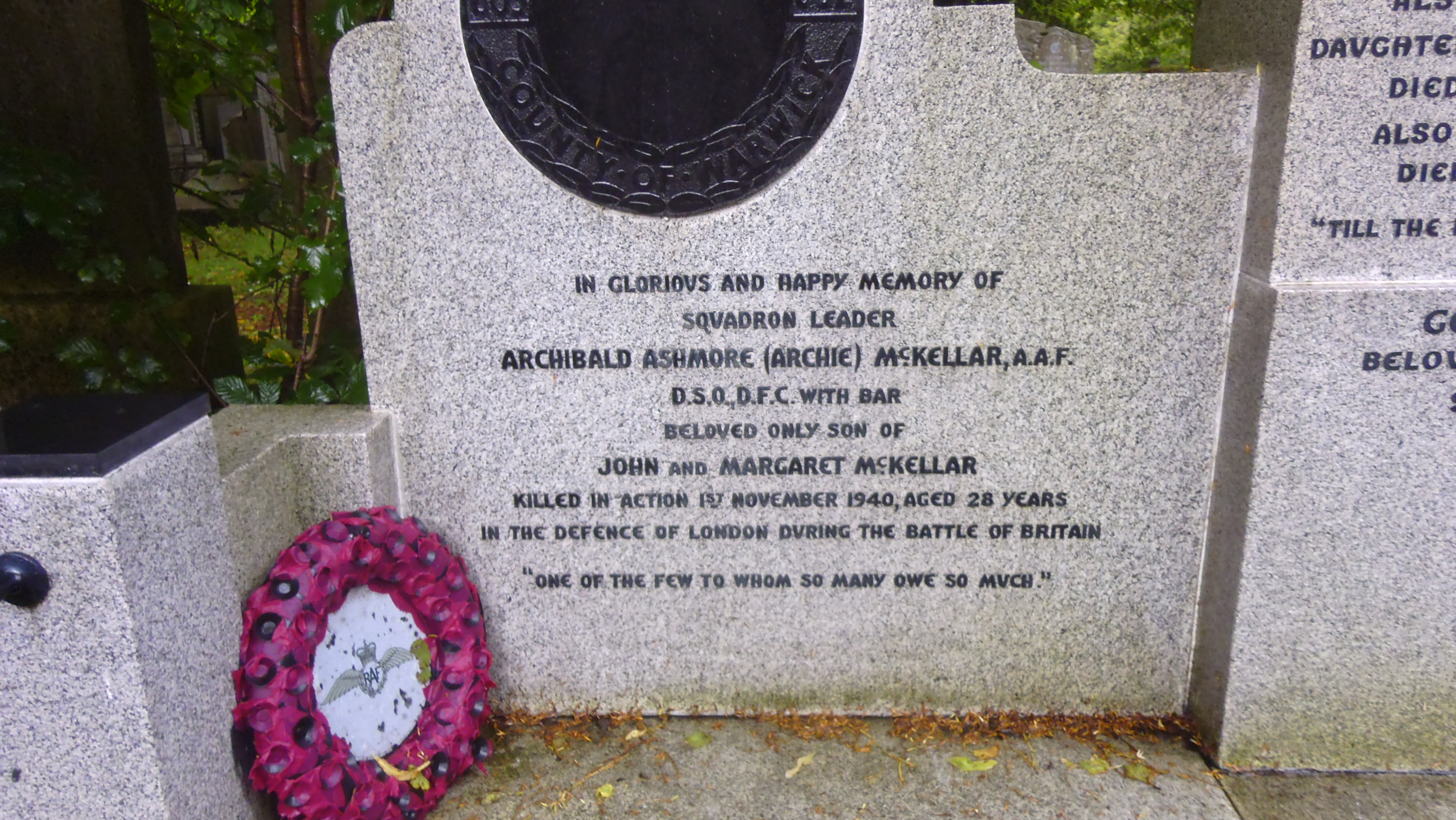
McKellar's headstone

== List of victories ==
Historian Alfred Price credited McKellar with 17 air victories, three shared destroyed, five probably destroyed and three damaged. Historians Christopher Shores and Clive Williams credit him with 21 air victories, three probably destroyed and three damaged as does E.C.R Baker. In his last combat they credit him with a possible 22nd victory, since a Bf 109 crashed in the area of his last combat and no RAF pilot made a claim. John Foreman credits him with at least 17 victories and acknowledges the unclaimed Bf 109 that crashed on 1 November 1940 near to McKellar might have been his last victory. Chaz Bowyer, another prolific historian and writer on RAF personnel, credits McKellar with at least 20 victories.

During the period he flew Hurricane P3308, McKellar scored 13 victories and shared one more destroyed, four probable and one damaged, between 15 August and 7 October 1940. This earned P3308 the distinction of being the Hurricane with the highest number of kills during the Battle of Britain. It was later handed over to a Czech unit, No. 312 Squadron RAF on 4 January 1941 and written off in an accident on 30 April 1941.

Chronicle of aerial victories
Claim No.	Date	Kills	Notes
1.	16 October 1939	1 x Junkers Ju 88	First enemy aircraft shot down in British waters. Gruppenkommandeur I./KG 30 Hauptmann Helmut Pohl's Junkers Ju 88 destroyed. Pohl survived and was captured by the Royal Navy; the rest of his crew were killed in action.
2.	28 October 1939	1 x Heinkel He 111	First enemy aircraft to fall on British soil since 1918; Stab./KG 26 code 1H+JA destroyed. Pilot Unteroffizier Lehmkuhl and Leutnant Niehoff were wounded and two other crew members killed. The fate of the fifth is unknown.
3–5.	15 August 1940	3 x He 111s	Unknown. Claimed at 13:15. Opponents from KG 26. Of the eight He 111s lost by KG 26, two have not been attributed to any particular squadron, two are credited to ground fire and four to No. 79 Squadron RAF and No. 235 Squadron RAF. The two outstanding victims were from 8 and 9 Staffel. In the first aircraft, He 111H-4, Leutnant Burk and his crew were missing and presumed dead. The second, He 111H-4, was lost with its unnamed crew. The two He 111s believed to have been shot down by ground fire were both from 8 Staffel. Oberleutnant von Lübke and Oberleutnant Besser were lost with all of their unnamed crew members.
6–9.	9 September 1940	3 x He 111s 1 x Bf 109	Claimed over the Brooklands area at 17:45. The identity of the He 111s are unknown. Seven Bf 109s are known to have been shot down on 9 September that cannot be matched to any specific RAF unit or pilot. McKellar engaged enemy aircraft over Canterbury and Croydon region at around 17:45. After patrolling at 15,000 feet, 605 engaged. The account of the air battle is confusing. McKellar's possible opponents were from Jagdgeschwader 3 (JG 3, Fighter Wing 3), Jagdgeschwader 27 or Jagdgeschwader 54. German casualties in the air battles were: Oberfeldwebel Müller of 4. Staffel (Squadron) JG 3 flying Werknummer 6138 posted missing. Feldwebel Bauer, 7. Staffel JG 3 flying Werknummer 5351 posted missing. Unteroffizier Massmann, Werknummer 6316, missing in action. Stab, I./JG 27's Oberleutnant Bode, flying Werknummer 6316 posted missing. Oberleutnant Daig, II./JG 27, missing. Feldwebel Höhnisch, Werknummer 1508 missing. Feldwebel Biber, 1. Staffel JG 54, Werknummer 6103, missing.
10–12.	15 September 1940	2 x Bf 109s 1 x Do 17	Claimed two Bf 109s over Edenbridge, Kent at 12:00. Later, at 14:30, claimed a Do 17 over Rochester, Kent. 605 Squadron engaged Jagdgeschwader 54 (JG 51—Fighter Wing 51). Pilot Officer Currant dispatched Werknummer 3266, from 7. Staffel and flown by Leutnant Bildau was posted missing. Another Bf 109 from 9 Staffel, Werknummer 2803 was also shot down. Feldwebel Klotz was wounded and taken prisoner. Also involved in the action were Bf 109s from Jagdgeschwader 3 (JG 3—Fighter Wing 3), Jagdgeschwader 54 (JG 53—Fighter Wing 53) and Jagdgeschwader 77 (JG 77—Fighter Wing 77). Lehrgeschwader 2 (LG 2—Learning Wing 2) provided top cover. JG 26 suffered no losses. JG 3 lost three Bf 109s in aerial combat. I./JG 3 lost Werknummer 1563, pilot unhurt. 1 Staffel lost Werknummer 0945 and Feldwebel Volmer missing. 2 Staffel lost Werknummer 1606, pilot Staffelkapitän (Squadron Leader) Oberleutnant Helmuth Reumschüssel missing. JG 53 lost eight Bf 109s, with seven completely destroyed. Seven were not directly credited to RAF units. In air combat, I./JG 53 lostUnteroffizier Schersand, killed in Weknummer 6160. 1 Staffel Bf 109, Werknummer 5111 crash-landed in France, 15% destroyed and the pilot unhurt. 3 Staffel lost Oberleutnant and Staffelkapitän Julius Jase, killed in Werkummer 1590. The same unit lost Unteroffizier Feldmann. Two more Bf 109s — Werknummer 1174 and 5251 from III./JG 53 – were destroyed, but their pilots were unhurt. One was rescued from the Channel. JG 77 lost a 1 Staffel Bf 109, pilot unhurt, Werknummer 4847 force-landed after combat over Dungeness. Another, Werknummer 4802 from 3 Stafel, was lost with its pilot Unteroffizier Meixner. At 14:00, McKellar led 605 on an attack against II./Kampfgeschwader 3 (KG 3—Bomber Wing 3), II and III./Kampfgeschwader 2 (KG 2—Bomber Wing 2), I and II./Kampfgeschwader 53 (KG 53—Bomber Wing 53) and I and II./Kampfgeschwader 26. He claimed one of the Do 17s before being recalled by No. 11 Group RAF commanding officer Keith Park to create a reserve for further operations. McKellar would be credited with one Do 17 destroyed whose identity is uncertain. Among the Do 17 losses, that have not been credited to a specific squadron, were: Do 17 Werknummer 3405 (code U5+FT) and 3230 (code U5+JT) from 9 Staffel KG 2. In the first crew, Oberleutnant Staib, Unteroffizier Hoppe were killed, Gefreiter Zierer and Hoffman posted missing. In the second crew, Unteroffizier Krummheuer, Feldwebel Glaser, Unteroffizier Lenz were killed and Unteroffizier Sehrt missing. Two more Do 17s were lost around the same time. 8 Staffel KG 2's Werknummer 4245 U5+GS, piloted by Oberleutnant Hugo Holleck-Weitmann, was lost. Holleck-Weitmann was killed, Unteroffizier Schweighart wounded, and Unteroffizier Lindemeier was missing. The remaining crewmen's fates are unknown. The second, Werknummer 3440, U5+PS, was lost. Oberleutnant Werner Kittmann, Unteroffizier's Stampfer and Langer posted missing. The remaining crewmen's fates are unknown.
13.	16 September 1940	1 x He 111	Awarded DFC*DSO Victory claimed at night, 01:00. Location of victory not recorded.
14–18.	7 October 1940	5 x Bf 109s	Claimed four in one battle at 13:30—one near the village of Brasted, Westerham; one east of Biggin Hill; Maidstone; and the final opponent near Ashford, Kent. The last and fifth claim of the day was made at 16:30 over Mayfield and Five Ashes. The Germans lost 12 Bf 109s on this date. Most can be credited to other RAF Squadrons. Two of McKellar's victories can be identified. Werknummer (factory number) 3665, of 5 Staffel (Squadron) Jagdgeschwader 27 was shot down between Maidstone and Westerham. Unteroffizier Lederer posted missing, captured wounded (Bedgebury Wood, SW of Cranbrook, Kent, England). The second was Werknummer 3881—Unteroffizier Paul Lege killed in action. Another loss was Werknummer 5391, of 4 Staffel Lehrgeschwader 2 (LG 2—Learning Wing 2). Pilot Unteroffizier Ley missing, presumed killed in action by 605 Hurricanes. Also lost that day was a 2 Staffel Jagdgeschwader 51 (JG 51—Fighter Wing 51) Bf 109, Werknummer 5805, which crash–landed near Calais after combat and was 65% destroyed. A second Bf 109 from the same unit, Werknummer 4103, was also destroyed. The pilot Oberleutnant Viktor Mölders—brother of the famous ace Werner Mölders—was posted as missing in action by the Luftwaffe. No times are given for these losses.
19.	20 October 1940	1 x Bf 109	His first victory that day can be identified as belonging to 3. Staffel Lehrgeschwader 2 (LG 2—Learning Wing). Unteroffizier Franz Mairl was killed in action in Bf 109 Werknummer 2059 Yellow 8 over Ashford, Kent at 10:00. A second enemy also fell that afternoon. Feldwebel Adolf Iburg from 9. Staffel Jagdgeschwader 54 (JG 54—Fighter Wing 54) crash–landed and was captured. The victory McKellar claimed was credited as damaged only.
20.	26 October 1940	1 x Bf 109	
21.	27 October 1940	1 x Bf 109	Claimed a Bf 109 at 09:30 over Croydon, Dungeness. The Germans lost 13 Bf 109s to all causes on this date. Seven machines were lost that day to unidentified squadrons over Kent: I./Jagdgeschwader 3 (JG 3—Fighter Wing 3) lost Bf 109E-7 Werknummer 4124. The pilot, Leutnant Wilhelm Busch, was posted missing in action. 8. Staffel JG 27's Bf 109 Werknummer 1329 damaged, force-landed in France after combat 20% destroyed. The same unit's squadron leader Oberleutnant Anton Pointer went missing. 9 Staffel Werknummer 4818 force-landed near Calais 40% destroyed. Pilot Albert Busenkeil was wounded. 2. Staffel Jagdgeschwader 52 (JG 52—Fighter Wing 52) Werknummer 1268 Black 5 was lost over Kent. Karl Bott was posted missing in action. 3. Staffel JG 52 lost Werknummer 2798 Yellow 2. Oberleutnant Ulrich Steinhilper was captured (and later made numerous escape attempts from Canada). In the same unit, Yellow 4, Werknummer 3525, was shot down. Lothar Schieverhöfer missing in action.
22. (Uncredited)	1 November 1940	1 x Bf 109	Logged as a claim over Faversham at 08:15. A Bf 109 did crash near McKellar, and no other RAF pilot claimed it as destroyed. It could have been brought down by McKellar, but remains uncredited.
TOTALS			21 kills

== Battle of Britain 80th Anniversary programme ==
McKellar was prominently featured in a Channel 5 programme commemorating the 80th anniversary of the Battle of Britain, presented by Dan Snow and Kate Humble. Entitled The Battle of Britain: 3 Days That Saved the Nation, the programme told McKellar's life story, The iPAPER published a detailed review of the programme, commenting on McKellar's "precocious gift for flying" and noting that his story was "little known".
