= Gerald Edge =

British flying ace of WWII

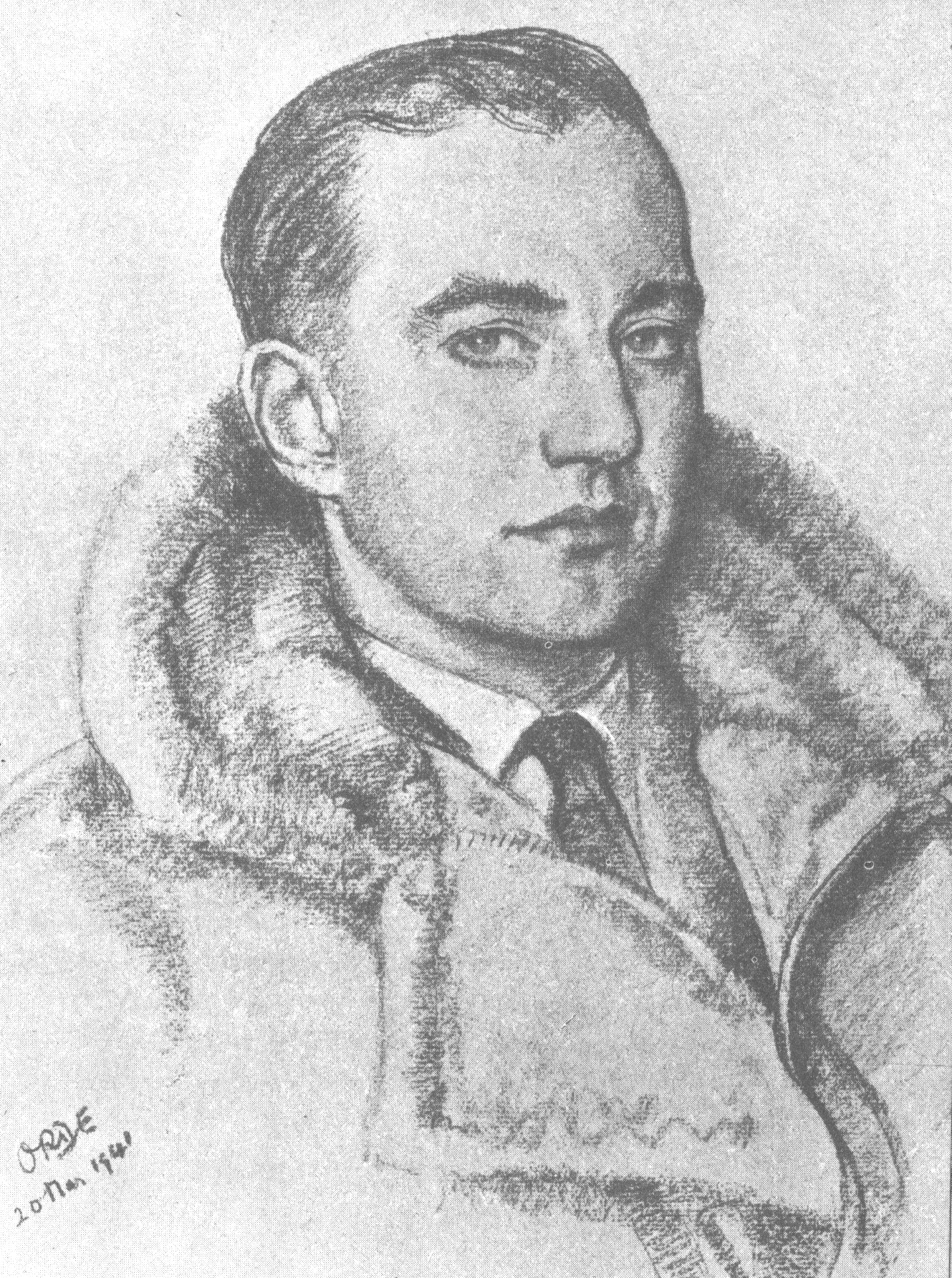
- Portrait of Edge, made by the official war artist Cuthbert Orde in 1941
- Born: 24 September 1913; Codsall, England
- Died: August 2000 (aged 86); Evesham, England
- Military career
- Allegiance: United Kingdom
- Branch: Royal Air Force
- Rank: Group Captain
- Commands: No. 253 Squadron; No. 605 Squadron; No. 73 OTU; No. 84 Group Control Centre
- Conflicts: Second World War: Battle of France; Battle of Britain; Circus offensive
- Awards: Officer of the Order of the British Empire; Distinguished Flying Cross; Mention in Despatches

Gerald Edge, OBE, DFC (24 September 1913 – August 2000) was a British flying ace of the Royal Air Force (RAF) during the Second World War. He is credited with the destruction of about twenty aircraft although there is some uncertainty regarding the exact total.

Born in Codsall, Edge was a serving member of the Auxiliary Air Force when he was called up for service with the RAF on the outbreak of the Second World War. He flew with No. 605 Squadron during the Battle of France and the subsequent Battle of Britain, destroying a number of German aircraft. Appointed commander of No. 253 Squadron during the later stages of the campaign over Southeast England, he received serious wounds after his Hawker Hurricane fighter was shot down on 26 September 1940. He had recovered by the end of the year and took command of No. 605 Squadron, leading it until September 1941. He served in training and staff posts for much of the remainder of the war. He left the RAF in late 1945, and took up farming in Kenya. He retired to England and died there in August 2000, aged 86.

== Early life ==
Gerald Richmond Edge was born on 24 September 1913 in Codsall, England. He was educated at Oundle School and in 1931 entered the family's metalworks business. He learnt to fly at Midland Aero Club and was granted his pilot's certificate in June 1936. The following month he joined the Auxiliary Air Force and was commissioned as a pilot officer. Serving with No. 605 Squadron, he was promoted to flying officer in 1938.

== Second World War ==
Edge was called up for service in the Royal Air Force (RAF) a week before the outbreak of the Second World War. No. 605 Squadron, which operated Hawker Hurricane fighters, was tasked with the defence of the Royal Navy base at Scapa Flow. On 10 April Edge and other pilots of the squadron engaged several Heinkel He 111 medium bombers to the east of Scapa Flow. Edge damaged three of these aircraft. He shared in the shooting down of a Dornier Do 17 medium bomber over the sea near Dumner Head on 9 May.

=== Battle of France ===
A week after the 10 May invasion of France and the Low Countries, No. 605 Squadron was moved to Hawkinge in Kent; from here the squadron flew sorties to France where Luftwaffe aircraft were attacking the retreating British Expeditionary Force. Edge damaged one Messerschmitt Bf 109 fighter over France on 22 May, and claimed to have shot down a second although this was not confirmed. The next day he damaged a He 111 and two Bf 109s. On 25 May, in sorties in the area around Calais, Edge destroyed three, possibly four, Junkers Ju 87 dive bombers and a Bf 109 although the latter was recorded as a Messerschmitt Bf 110 heavy fighter in his log book. He shot down a Junkers Ju 88 medium bomber to the east of Courtrai the next day, also claiming a second as probably destroyed and a Bf 110 as damaged.

On a sortie to the southeast of Dunkirk on 27 May, Edge shot down two Do 17s, one of these shared. On the squadron's final sortie, a patrol over Dunkirk, several of its pilots were killed or shot down. This left Edge and one other pilot as the last of the original complement of aircrew that was serving with the squadron at the start of the war.

=== Battle of Britain ===
After the campaign in France, No. 605 Squadron moved to Drem for a rest and to reequip. Promoted to flight lieutenant in early June, later that month he was appointed commander of one of the squadron's flights. On 5 September Edge, promoted to acting squadron leader, took command of No. 253 Squadron. Operating Hurricanes from Kenley, his new unit was heavily engaged as the Luftwaffe escalated its operations against the RAF airfields in the south of England, being scrambled multiple times a day to counter incoming bombing raids. Edge was known for his aggressive tactics, leading the squadron in head-on attacks against approaching bomber formations. On 7 September Edge shot down two He 111s over Thameshaven and also damaged a third. The squadron was involved in the interception of large bombing raids on 9 and 11 September and across these two days, Edge claimed to have shot down four Ju 88s, two He 111s with a third probably destroyed, and a Bf 109.

Edge was awarded the Distinguished Flying Cross on 13 September. Two days later, on what became known as Battle of Britain Day, he shot down a Do 17 and Ju 88. On 26 September, Edge's Hurricane was damaged during an engagement with fighters over the English Channel. His aircraft in flames, Edge bailed out and came down in the sea off Dungeness. He was collected by a fisherman and, stricken with burns, was taken to hospital to Willsborough Hospital at Ashford. He returned to duty with No. 253 Squadron on 14 November but was still hampered by his injuries and placed on sick leave.

On 5 December Edge, now recovered and returned to the acting squadron leader rank he had relinquished while on sick leave, was given command of No. 605 Squadron. Now stationed at Croydon it saw little action as the intensity of the Luftwaffe's operations had significantly declined by this time. In early 1941, Fighter Command went on to the offensive and No. 605 Squadron began to fly operations over France as part of the RAF's Circus offensive. At the end of the month, the squadron was rested and sent to Martlesham Heath for a month, before moving again, this time to Tern Hill where it stayed until May, then relocating to Baginton for four months. Its pace of operations throughout this period was reduced.

=== Later war service ===
In September, just as No. 605 Squadron moved south to Kenley for greater involvement in the Circus offensive, Edge's squadron leader rank was made substantive. Later in the month he was posted to the Middle East to establish No. 73 Operational Training Unit at Aden. He was subsequently assigned to the Western Desert Air Force Command Centre as the Senior Air Staff Officer. In July 1943, Edge, who had been involved in the preparations for the invasion of Sicily, returned to the United Kingdom for health reasons. He was mentioned in despatches in September, and on recovery of his health, served as a controller at Colerne. He was appointed commander of No. 84 Group Control Centre towards the end of the year. He was promoted to temporary wing commander in January 1944. Following the Normandy landings, Edge led his unit to France and his wing commander rank was made substantive in August.

In the 1945 New Year Honours, Edge was appointed an Officer of the Order of the British Empire. He subsequently served as a staff officer at the Air Ministry, working on operational requirements, until he left the RAF in late 1945, holding the rank of group captain.

== Later life ==
Returning to civilian life, Edge relocated to Kenya where he took up farming. In 1963, with his wife Sonia, he returned to England and settled at Pin Hills Farm near Inkberrow. He later moved to Evesham in Worcestershire, and he died there in August 2000. He was survived by his daughter; his wife had predeceased him in 1980.

Edge is credited with having destroyed about twenty aircraft, one or two of which were shared with other pilots. He is believed to have probably destroyed three aircraft and damaged at least seven others. Poor record keeping at the units that he served with in 1940, and his own lack of attention to paperwork, mean that there is some uncertainty regarding Edge's number of aerial victories.
