= Eric Wright (footballer) =

Liberian footballer

Personal information
- Full name: Eric Wright
- Date of birth: August 31, 1980 (age 46)
- Place of birth: Liberia
- Position: Defender

Team information
- Current team: Invincible Eleven

Senior career*
Years	Team	Apps	(Gls)
2003	Mark Professionals		
2004–present	Invincible Eleven		

International career
2000–present	Liberia		
- * Club domestic league appearances and goals as of 13:42, 07 March 2008 (UTC)

Eric Wright (born August 31, 1980) is a Liberian footballer (defender) playing currently for Invincible Eleven. He is also a member of the Liberia national football team.
