= Eric William Wright =

- Born: 21 September 1919; Cherry Hinton, Cambridge, England
- Died: 5 November 2007 (aged 88)
- Spouse: Katherine Skingley (m. 1946)
- Military career
- Allegiance: United Kingdom
- Branch: Royal Air Force
- Service years: 1939–1973
- Rank: Air Commodore
- Nickname: Ricky Wright
- Service number: Airman: 748522; Officer: 64870
- Commands: RAF Cottesmore (1964–65); RAF Coningsby (1963–64); RAF North Coates (1958–59); No. 54 Squadron (1948–49); No. 92 Squadron (1947); No. 91 Squadron (1946–47); No. 605 Squadron (1942); No. 232 Squadron (1942)
- Conflicts: Second World War: Battle of Britain; Suez Crisis
- Awards: Commander of the Order of the British Empire; Distinguished Flying Cross; Distinguished Flying Medal; King's Commendation for Valuable Service in the Air; Air Efficiency Award

Air Commodore Eric William "Ricky" Wright, CBE, DFC, DFM, AE (21 September 1919 – 5 November 2007) was a senior officer in the Royal Air Force who flew Hurricanes with No. 605 Squadron in the Battle of Britain.

== Early year ==
He was educated at Cambridge County School and the Technical College. He joined the RAF Volunteer Reserve in June 1939 and was called up when he had completed his training as a pilot. Once he had completed his training as a pilot he was called up into the regular air force.

== Royal Air Force ==
Wright joined No. 605 (County of Warwick) Squadron in July 1940, and saw action during the Battle of Britain. In early September he shared in the destruction of a Messerschmitt Bf 110 and a Dornier 17. On 15 September Wright shot down a Dornier 17 over Maidstone.

By the end of the year he had accounted for six enemy aircraft, probably destroyed three more and damaged six. At the end of November he was awarded a Distinguished Flying Medal. As a sergeant pilot he was granted a commission as a pilot officer on probation on 18 December 1940.

Wright was posted to the Far East in 1941, as a flight commander in No. 232 Squadron. After the Japanese attacks on Malaya the squadron reinforced the defences at Singapore at the end of January 1942. Within a week Wright's commanding officer had been killed and Wright was promoted to squadron leader. He claimed a Japanese bomber damaged off the coast of Singapore. The squadron soon evacuated to Sumatra and then to Java. In March Wright was ordered to take his remaining pilots to Tjilatjap, ready to board a boat for Australia. On arrival however, the last boat had been sunk, and when the island fell to the Japanese a few days later Wright and his pilots were made prisoners of war.

After a period at Batavia repairing the airfield, Wright and his fellow prisoners were shipped to Japan and worked as farm labourers and in shipbuilding yards.

After the war, he was granted a permanent commission as a flight lieutenant (but continued to be allowed to use his final wartime rank) on 19 December 1945. Wright was a member of the RAF's official aerobatic team, No. 247 Squadron flying Vampires. In April 1948 he flew one of the six Vampire F.IIIs of No 54 Squadron making the first Atlantic crossing by jet aircraft.

== Honours and awards ==
- 26 November 1940 – 748522 Sergeant Eric William Wright, RAFVR of 605 Squadron is awarded the Distinguished Flying Medal:

This airman has displayed fine qualities of leadership, skill and courage. His sound tactics and efficiency have enabled him to destroy at least six enemy aircraft.

— London Gazette

- 1 October 1946 – Acting Squadron Leader Eric William Wright, DFM (64870) RAFVR is awarded a Distinguished Flying Cross in recognition of gallant and distinguished services rendered during the period of operations against the Japanese in Malaya and the Netherlands East India terminating in March 1942.
- 1 January 1949 – Acting Squadron Leader E.W.Wright DFC DFM (64870) RAF is named as being commended with the King's Commendation for Valuable Service in the Air.
- 1 January 1964 – Group Captain Eric William Wright DFC DFM is appointed a Commander of the Order of the British Empire.
