= No. 605 Squadron RAuxAF =

No. 605 (County of Warwick) Squadron RAuxAF
- No. 605 Squadron badge
- Active: 5 October 1926 – March 1942; 7 June 1942 – 31 August 1945; 10 May 1946 – 10 March 1957; 1 November 2014 –
- Country: United Kingdom
- Branch: Royal Auxiliary Air Force
- Role: Logistics
- Part of: No 85 Expeditionary Logistics Wing, RAF A4 Force
- Nickname: County of Warwick
- Mottos: Latin: Nunquam Dormio (Translation: "I Never Sleep")
- Battle honours: Dunkirk*; Battle of Britain, 1940*; Malta, 1941*; Eastern Waters, 1942*; Fortress Europe, 1942–1943*; Home Defence, 1944*; France and Germany, 1944–1945*; Honours marked with an asterisk* are those emblazoned on the Squadron Standard

Commanders
- Honorary Air Commodore: Robert Nixon, CBE
- Notable commanders: Archie McKellar, Eric William Wright, Peter Townsend, Bertie R. O'Bryen "Sammy" Hoare

Insignia
- Squadron Badge heraldry: On a mount, a bear supporting a ragged staff
- Squadron Codes: HE (Apr 1939 – Sep 1939); UP (Jan 1942 – Aug 1945); RAL (May 1946 – 1949); NR (1949 – Apr 1951)

No. 605 Squadron was formed as an Auxiliary Air Force Squadron. Initially formed as a bomber unit, it became a fighter squadron prior to the Second World War and was one of the most successful participants of the Battle of Britain. It also had the distinction of being active during the war on two fronts at the same time, when the squadron was split up between Malta and the Dutch East Indies. In its last incarnation as an active flying unit, the squadron served as the first jet fighter unit in the post-war Royal Auxiliary Air Force; 616 having already flown Gloster Meteors during the war. No. 605 Squadron was reformed as a RAuxAF Logistic Support Squadron (LSS) on 1 Nov 2014 within No. 85 Expeditionary Logistics Wing of the RAF A4 Force. On the 1 January 2019, the Reserve Logistic Support Wing (RLSW) was established with 501, 504 and 605 LSS Squadron's moving from No. 85 (Expeditionary Logistics) Wing RAF to form RLSW.

== History ==
=== Formation and early years ===
No. 605 Squadron was formed on 5 October 1926 at RAF Castle Bromwich as a day bomber unit of the Auxiliary Air Force, recruiting in the Birmingham area. Initially equipped with DH.9As, it received Westland Wapitis in April 1930 and Hawker Harts in October 1934. The latter were replaced by Hawker Hinds in August 1936. On 1 January 1939 No. 605 Squadron was re-designated as a fighter squadron and re-equipped with Gloster Gladiators.

=== Second World War ===
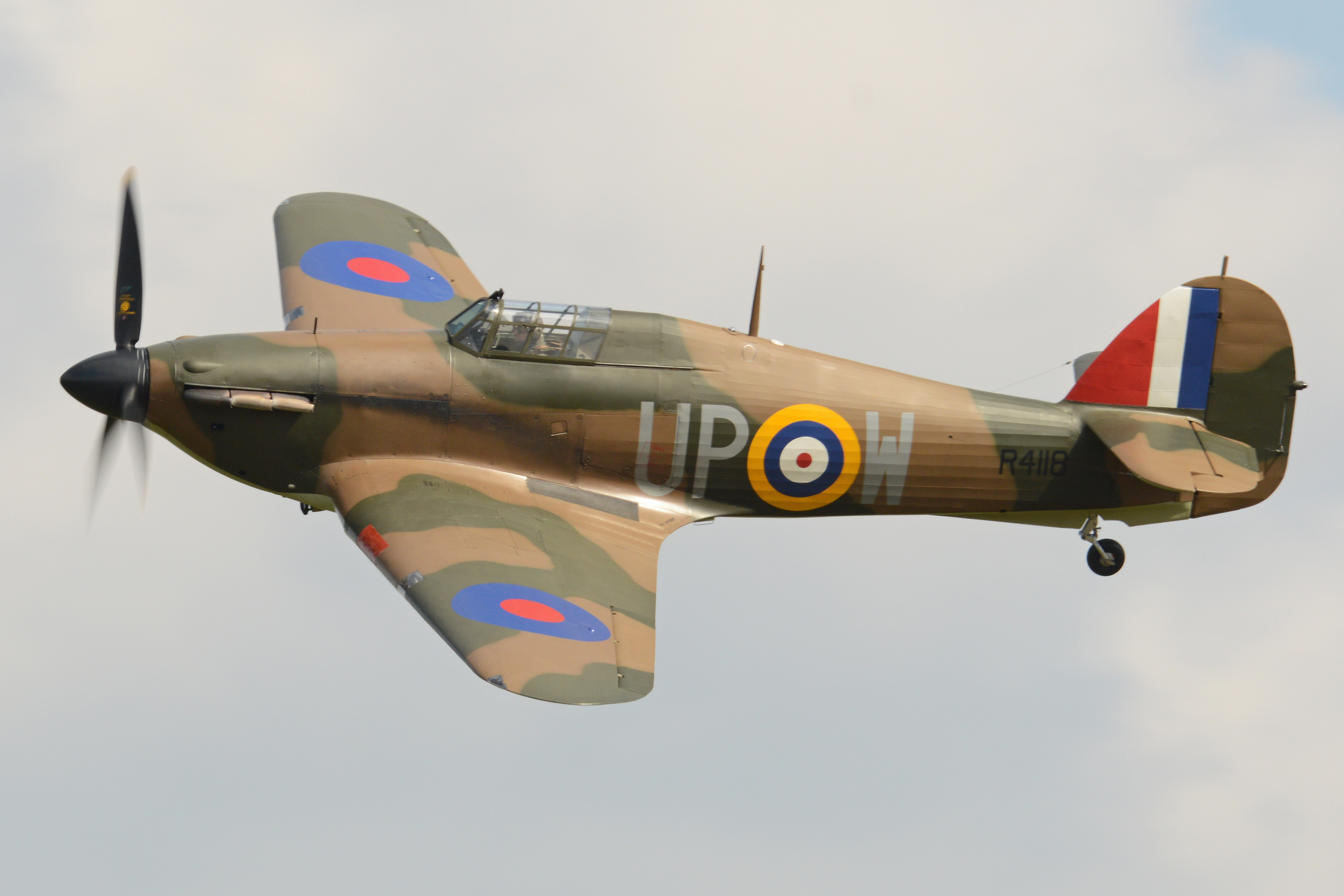
A 605 squadron Hurricane Mk.I, RAF serial R4118, squadron code UP-W

Hawker Hurricanes began to arrive a few weeks before the outbreak of the Second World War, and the squadron took up its war station at RAF Tangmere with a mixture of six Hurricanes and ten Gladiators, completing re-equipment during October 1939. In February 1940 the squadron moved to Scotland, but returned south in May to fly patrols over northern France for a week before moving back to Scotland at RAF Drem. It again moved south again in September for the closing stages of the Battle of Britain. It then continued to operate from bases in the south, carrying out escort duties and fighter sweeps until posted overseas.

=== Malta and the Far East ===
In November 1941, the squadron were embarked on the aircraft carrier HMS Argus and taken via Gibraltar to a launch point near enough to Malta that they would be able to fly the remaining distance. See Club Run and Operation Perpetual. The squadron was then temporarily based at Malta in order to augment the island's defences, prior to elements of the squadron continuing their journey to the Far East. Arriving in Singapore too late to prevent its capture, the squadron moved to Sumatra and then to Java, in the event caught up in the Japanese invasion. It operated any aircraft it could fly until it ceased to exist with its personnel either escaping in small groups or being captured. In the meantime, the small detachment of the squadron that had been left on Malta during the transit journey to the Far East, began operations on 10 January 1942 using the 605 squadron number in its reports. This ended two months later when these detachments were absorbed into No. 185 Squadron RAF.

=== Reformation as night intruders ===
A new No. 605 squadron was formed at RAF Ford on 7 June 1942, equipped with Douglas Boston and Havocs in the intruder role. These were replaced with de Havilland Mosquitos from February 1943 and it continued to operate this type until the end of the war. During this period, Peter Middleton, the grandfather of the Princess of Wales, was a pilot on the squadron. The squadron moved to Belgium in March 1945 and then the Netherlands in April. The squadron disbanded by being re-numbered to No. 4 Squadron RAF on 31 August 1945 at Volkel Air Base.

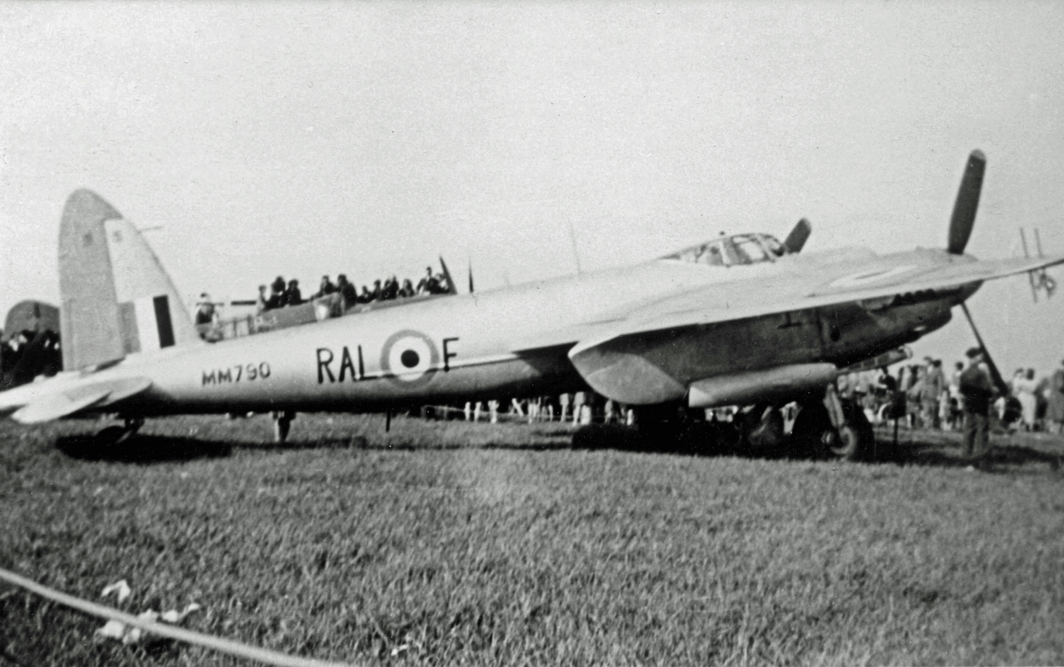
De Havilland Mosquito NF.30 of 605 Squadron in 1948

One of the squadron's Mosquitos FB.VI TA122 is now on permanent display at the de Havilland Aircraft Museum located in Hertfordshire.

=== After the war ===
With the reactivation of the Royal Auxiliary Air Force, No. 605 Squadron was reformed on 10 May 1946 at RAF Honiley as a night fighter squadron, though its initial equipment of Mosquito NF.30s did not arrive until April 1947. In July 1948 the squadron's role was changed to that of a day fighter squadron, for which it received de Havilland Vampire F.1s, replacing them with Vampire FB.5s in May 1951. A little short of six years later the squadron was disbanded, along with all the flying units of the RAuxAF, on 10 March 1957.

=== Present day ===
No. 605 (County of Warwick) Squadron was reformed as a RAF Reserve Logistics Support Squadron on 1 Nov 2014 within No. 85 Expeditionary Logistics Wing of the RAF A4 Force. Based at RAF Cosford, near Wolverhampton. The first reservist recruiting event was 30 May 2015, recruiting drivers, chefs, suppliers and police, which will be broken down as 112 part-time and 14 full-time posts.

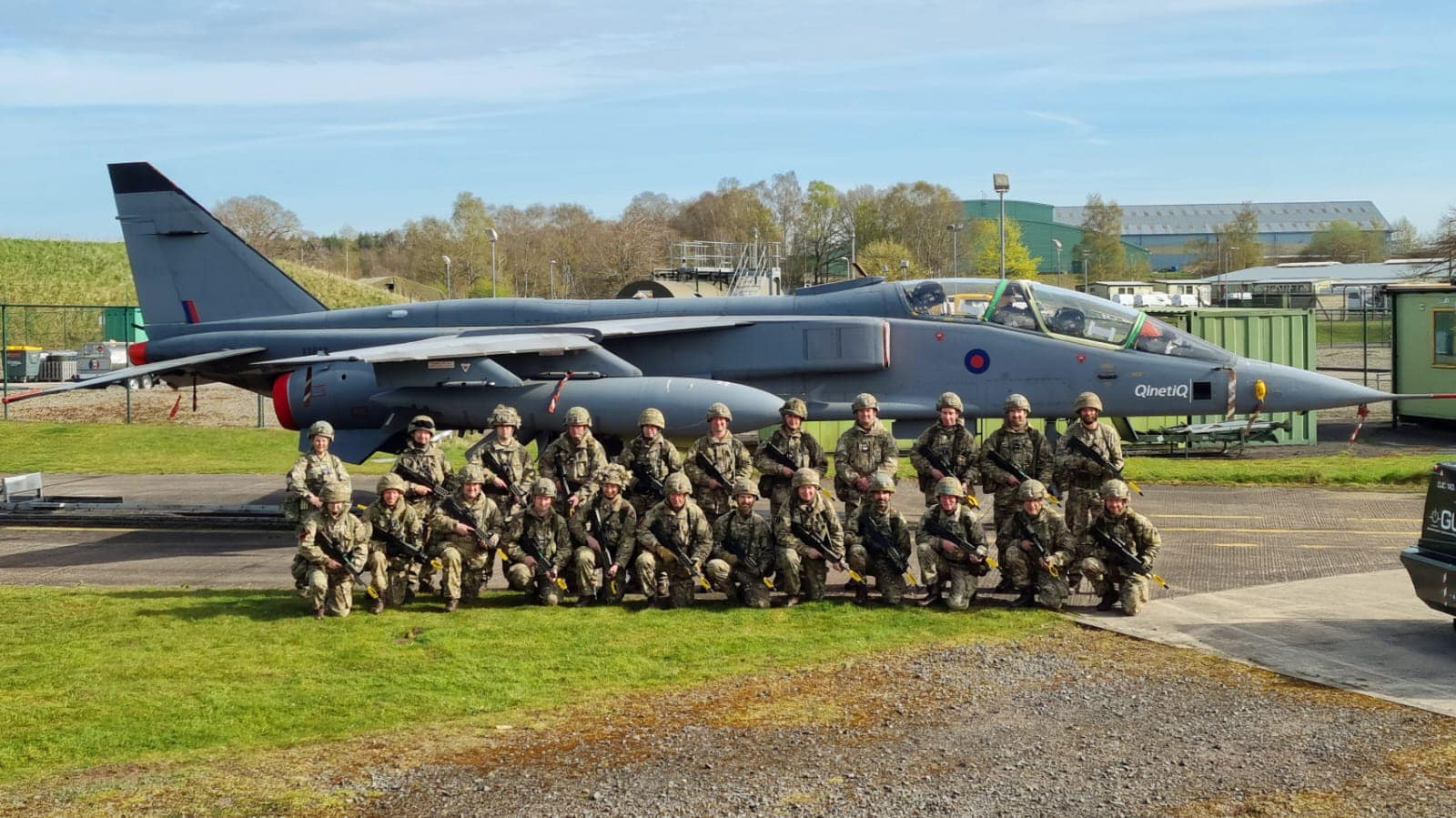
605 Squadron Present Day

605 Squadron currently deploys personnel onto RAF exercises and RAF operations across the world including recent deployments in 2022 and 2023 to The Falklands, Cyprus, The USA and The Middle East.

They were fully operational by May 2018 and as of 2023 are still recruiting Logisticians including Drivers, Suppliers, Police and Chefs.

== Aircraft operated ==
Aircraft operated by no. 605 Squadron RAF, data from
From	To	Aircraft	Version
October 1926	June 1930	Airco DH.9A	
April 1930	December 1934	Westland Wapiti	Mk.IIa
February 1934	August 1936	Hawker Hart	
August 1936	February 1939	Hawker Hind	
February 1939	October 1939	Gloster Gladiator	Mks.I, II
August 1939	December 1940	Hawker Hurricane	Mk.I
December 1940	August 1941	Hawker Hurricane	Mk.IIa
August 1941	March 1942	Hawker Hurricane	Mk.IIb
July 1942	October 1942	Douglas Havoc	Mks.I, II
July 1942	March 1943	Douglas Boston	Mk.III
February 1943	July 1943	de Havilland Mosquito	Mk.II
July 1943	August 1945	de Havilland Mosquito	Mk.VI
April 1947	January 1949	de Havilland Mosquito	NF.30
July 1948	May 1951	de Havilland Vampire	F.1
April 1951	March 1957	de Havilland Vampire	FB.5

== Squadron bases ==
Bases and airfields used by no. 605 Squadron RAF, data from
From	To	Base	Remark
5 October 1926	27 August 1939	RAF Castle Bromwich, England	First formation
27 August 1939	11 Feb 1940	RAF Tangmere, Sussex, England	
11 Feb 1940	27 Feb 1940	RAF Leuchars, Fife, Scotland	
27 Feb 1940	21 May 1940	RAF Wick, Caithness, Scotland	
21 May 1940	28 May 1940	RAF Hawkinge, Kent, England	
28 May 1940	7 Sept 1940	RAF Drem, Lothian, Scotland	
7 Sept 1940	26 Feb 1941	RAF Croydon, Surrey, England	
26 Feb 1941	31 March 1941	RAF Martlesham Heath, Suffolk, England	
31 March 1941	1 July 1941	RAF Tern Hill, Shropshire, England	
1 July 1941	4 Sept 1941	RAF Baginton, Warwickshire, England	
4 Sept 1941	31 October 1941	RAF Honiley, Warwickshire, England	Left to Far East from here on HMS Argus
5 Nov 1941	12 Nov 1941	RAF Gibraltar	to Malta via HMS Argus and HMS Ark Royal
12 Nov 1941	18 March 1942	RAF Hal Far, Malta	Dets. at RAF Luqa and RAF Ta Kali. Absorbed into No. 185 Squadron
c. January 1942*	2 Feb 1942	Singapore	*arrived too late to prevent Fall of Singapore
3 Feb 1942	10 Feb 1942	Batavia, Dutch East Indies	ad-hoc operations whilst pursued by advancing Japanese forces
10 Feb 1942	14 Feb 1942	Palembang, Sumatra, Dutch East Indies	605 personnel join with Nos. 238 and 242 Squadron RAF on 14 Feb.
14 Feb 1942	Feb 1942	Tjililitan, Java, Dutch East Indies	ad-hoc operations whilst pursued by advancing Japanese forces
Feb 1942	March 1942	Tasik Malaya, Java, Dutch East Indies	Dispersed from here, some ground personnel captured as POWs
7 June 1942	15 March 1943	RAF Ford, Sussex, England	Second formation
15 March 1943	6 October 1943	RAF Castle Camps, Cambs, England	
6 October 1943	7 April 1944	RAF Bradwell Bay, Essex, England	
7 April 1944	21 Nov 1944	RAF Manston, Kent, England	
21 Nov 1944	15 March 1945	RAF Hartford Bridge, Hampshire, England	Airfield name changed to RAF Blackbushe, December 1944
15 March 1945	28 April 1945	B.71/Koksijde, Belgium	
28 April 1945	31 August 1945	B.80/Volkel, the Netherlands	
10 May 1946	11 March 1957	RAF Honiley, Warwickshire, England	Third formation and last disbandment
1 Nov 2014	Present	RAF Cosford, Shropshire, England	Reformed as a Logistics Support Squadron

== Honorary Air Commodores ==
- Viscount Bearsted 1928–1937
- William Lindsay Everard 1937–1947
- J.A.C. Wright 1947–1957
- Robert Nixon, CBE, DL 2026–present

== Commanding Officers ==
Commanding Officers of 605 Squadron include:

From	To	Name
October 1926	March 1936	S/Ldr. J.A.C. Wright, AFC, TD
March 1936	December 1939	S/Ldr. Lord Willoughby de Broke, MC, AFC
December 1939	May 1940	S/Ldr G.V. Perry
May 1940	June 1940	F/Lt. R.G. Grant-Ferris, MP (acting)
June 1940	September 1940	S/Ldr. W.M. Churchill, DSO, DFC
September 1940	November 1940	S/Ldr. A.A. McKellar, DSO, DFC
November 1940	November 1940	F/Lt. C.F. Currant, DFC (acting)
November 1940	September 1941	S/Ldr. Gerald Edge, DFC
February 1942	March 1942	S/Ldr. E.W. Wright, DFM (Batavia)
June 1942	August 1942	W/Cdr. P.W. Townsend, DSO, DFC
August 1942	May 1943	W/Cdr. G.L. Denholm, DFC
May 1943	September 1943	W/Cdr. C.D Tomalin, AFC
September 1943	April 1944	W/Cdr. B.R.O'B Hoare, DSO, DFC and Bar
April 1944	September 1944	W/Cdr. N.J. Star, DFC
September 1944	March 1945	W/Cdr. R.A.Mitchell, DFC and Bar
March 1945	April 1945	S/Ldr. A.G.Woods, DFC (acting)
April 1945	July 1945	W/Cdr. A.W. Horne, DFC, AFC
July 1945	May 1946	S/Ldr. I.F.McCall, DFC (acting)
May 1946	December 1947	S/Ldr. R.J. Walker, DSO
December 1947	July 1949	S/Ldr. R.C.T. Goodwin
July 1949	August 1951	S/Ldr. J.A. Timmis
August 1951	May 1956	S/Ldr. P.M.R. Walton
May 1956	March 1957	S/Ldr. R.E. Tickner
March 1957		All RAuxAF units disbanded
August 2014		Reformed as a Logistics Support and RAF Police Sqn
August 2014	November 2015	Wg Cdr. M. Sherburn
November 2015	January 2016	Sqn Ldr. T. Newton, (acting)
January 2016	May 2019	Wg Cdr. P.N. Bell
May 2019	July 2019	Wg Cdr. A.G. Kime (acting)
July 2019	October 2021	Sqn Ldr. C.J. Krolikowski
October 2021	June 2022	Flt Lt. M. Salt (acting)
June 2022	Present	Sqn Ldr J. A. Roylance
