= Walter Zellot =

German World War II fighter pilot (1920 – 1942)

- Born: 6 October 1920; Spittal an der Drau, Austria
- Died: 10 September 1942 (aged 21); Stalingrad, Soviet Union
- Cause of death: Killed in action
- Military career
- Allegiance: Nazi Germany
- Branch: Luftwaffe
- Rank: Leutnant (second lieutenant)
- Unit: JG 53
- Conflicts: World War II
- Awards: Knight's Cross of the Iron Cross

Walter Zellot (6 October 1920 – 10 September 1942) was a World War II fighter pilot from Nazi Germany. Zellot is credited with shooting down 86 Allied aircraft in 296 combat missions. Among these 83 were achieved over the Eastern Front.

== Career ==
Zellot was born on 6 October 1920 in Spittal an der Drau in Carinthia of the Republic of Austria. In 1941, he was posted Jagdgeschwader 53 (JG 53—53rd Fighter Wing) where he was assigned to 1. Staffel (1st Squadron). On 6 June, I. Gruppe moved to Mannheim-Sandhofen Airfield. Following a maintenance overhaul of the aircraft, I. Gruppe moved to an airfield named Krzewicza located near Międzyrzec Podlaski, approximately 65 kilometers (40 miles) west of Brest, from 12 to 14 June.

=== Operation Barbarossa and Malta ===
On 22 June, the Geschwader crossed into Soviet airspace in support of Operation Barbarossa, the invasion of the Soviet Union, which opened the Eastern Front. I. Gruppe took off on its first mission at 3:40 am, escorting Junkers Ju 87 dive bombers. On the second mission of the day which took off at 9:10 am, again escorting Ju 87 dive bombers, Zellot claimed his first aerial victory when he shot down a Polikarpov I-16 fighter. Supporting the German attack, the Gruppe moved to Pruzhany on 25 June, to Baranavichy on 29 June, to Hostynne the next day, reaching Dubno on 5 July. Here, Zellot claimed his second aerial victory on 6 July.

In December 1941, I. Gruppe was moved to Mediterranean air bases at Gela in Sicily where they fought in the aerial battles of the Siege of Malta. On 20 April 1941 during Operation Calendar, Zellot claimed a Supermarine Spitfire fighter shot down near Malta. His victim may have been Flight Sergeant George Ryckman, a Canadian from the Royal Canadian Air Force 402 Squadron, who flew with the No. 126 Squadron and was killed in action. The following day, Zellot shot down Squadron Leader John Bisdee, the commanding officer of the No. 601 Squadron.

=== Eastern Front ===
In early May 1942, I. Gruppe was transferred back to the Eastern Front. Prior to the relocation, the Gruppe received a full complement of 41 factory new Messerschmitt Bf 109 F-4 aircraft at Schwäbisch Hall before heading for Prague Ruzyne Airfield on 28 May. The following day, I. Gruppe flew to Kursk. There, the Gruppe supported the German 4th Panzer Army in its advance towards Voronezh during Case Blue, the 1942 strategic summer offensive in southern Russia between 28 June and 24 November 1942.

=== Squadron leader and death ===
On 19 August 1942, Zellot was appointed Staffelkapitän (squadron leader) of 2. Staffel of JG 53, replacing Hauptmann Klaus Quaet-Faslem who was transferred. On 23 August, German forces launched the Battle of Stalingrad with the 16th Panzer Division, and elements of the 3rd Motorized Infantry Division and 60th Motorized Infantry Division crossing the Don near Vertyachy. That day, Zellot claimed four aerial victories in support of the German attack.

However, earlier on the same day of his appointment on 19 August 1942, his Bf 109 G-2 (Werknummer 14189—factory number) was shot-up by a Soviet fighter, probably the Yakovlev Yak-1 flown by future ace Boris M. Vasilyev (929 IAP). Zellot was awarded the Knight's Cross of the Iron Cross (Ritterkreuz des Eisernen Kreuzes) on 3 September 1942 following his 75th aerial victory.

On 10 September 1942, Zellot was killed in action while engaged in a low-level attack on Soviet troops northwest of Stalingrad, shot down by anti-aircraft fire. He bailed out at low altitude, insufficient for his parachute to open, and was killed. According to Prien, Zellot may have been shot down by friendly fire. His Bf 109 G-2 (Werknummer 13487) had its tail blown off and crashed 20 kilometers (12 miles) east of Vertyachy. At the time oh his death, he was the most successful fighter pilot of I. Gruppe of JG 53. Zellot was temporarily succeeded by Oberleutnant Friedrich-Karl Müller as commander of 2. Staffel. In parallel, Müller who was officially heading 1. Staffel of JG 53.

== Summary of military career ==
=== Aerial victory claims ===
According to US historian David T. Zabecki, Zellot was credited with 85 aerial victories. Spick also lists him with 85 aerial victories and a mission-to-claim ratio of 3.48. Mathews and Foreman, authors of Luftwaffe Aces — Biographies and Victory Claims, researched the German Federal Archives and found records for 84 aerial victory claims, including 81 aerial victories on the Eastern Front and three on the Western Front.

Victory claims were logged to a map-reference (PQ = Planquadrat), for example "PQ 49721". The Luftwaffe grid map (Jägermeldenetz) covered all of Europe, western Russia and North Africa and was composed of rectangles measuring 15 minutes of latitude by 30 minutes of longitude, an area of about 360 square miles (930 km^{2}). These sectors were then subdivided into 36 smaller units to give a location area 3 km × 4 km (1.9 mi × 2.5 mi) in size.

Chronicle of aerial victories
This and the ♠ (Ace of spades) indicates those aerial victories which made Zellot an "ace-in-a-day", a term which designates a fighter pilot who has shot down five or more airplanes in a single day. This and the ? (question mark) indicates information discrepancies listed by Prien, Stemmer, Rodeike, Bock, Mathews and Foreman.
Claim	Date	Time	Type	Location	Claim	Date	Time	Type	Location
– 1. Staffel of Jagdgeschwader 53 – Operation Barbarossa — 22 June – 7 August 1941
1	22 June 1941	09:45	I-16		7	18 July 1941	04:50	Pe-2	south of Vasylkiv
2	6 July 1941	15:25	Pe-2	10 km (6.2 mi) southwest of Proskuriv	8	26 July 1941	11:00	V-11 (Il-2)	
3	10 July 1941	15:30? (Note: According to Mathews and Foreman claimed at 19:30.)	SB-3		9	27 July 1941	15:00	I-16	north of Bila Tserkva
4	11 July 1941	11:10	SB-2? (Note: According to Mathews and Foreman claimed as a Tupolev SB-3.)		10	31 July 1941	19:20	I-16	north of Novomyrhorod
5	11 July 1941	11:20	DB-3?		11? (Note: This claim is notlisted by Mathews and Foreman.)	2 August 1941	05:10	I-16	12 km (7.5 mi) southeast of Novomyrhorod
6?	11 July 1941	19:37	I-16		12	5 August 1941	18:15	Pe-2	southeast of Kyiv
– 1. Staffel of Jagdgeschwader 53 – Mediterranean Theater — 15 December 1941 – 30 April 1942
13	27 December 1941	12:07	Hurricane	30 km (19 mi) east of Malta	15	21 April 1942	12:45	Spitfire	near Malta
14	20 April 1942	18:05	Spitfire	near Malta					
– 1. Staffel of Jagdgeschwader 53 – Eastern Front — 28 May 1942 – 18 August 1942
16	4 June 1942	14:37	I-61 (MiG-3)		37	6 August 1942	07:05	Il-2	PQ 49721; 30 km (19 mi) northeast of Aksay
17	2 July 1942	07:10	MiG-1		38	6 August 1942	07:10	MiG-1	PQ 49721; 30 km (19 mi) northeast of Aksay
18	3 July 1942	18:20	LaGG-3	4 km (2.5 mi) east of Sossne-Olynn	39	7 August 1942	05:45	Pe-2	PQ 4959; 45 km (28 mi) east-northeast of Aksay
19	6 July 1942	07:50	LaGG-3	30 km (19 mi) east of Livny	40	7 August 1942	05:47	Il-2	PQ 4959; 45 km (28 mi) east-northeast of Aksay
20	9 July 1942	11:15	Il-2		41	7 August 1942	05:50	Il-2	west of Zarza
21	11 July 1942	13:50	R-5		42	8 August 1942	12:53? (Note: According to Mathews and Foreman claimed at 12:50.)	LaGG-3	PQ 4953; 35 km (22 mi) south of Stalingrad
22	12 July 1942	06:03	Pe-2		43	9 August 1942	05:30	Er-2	PQ 4942; 30 km (19 mi) east-southeast of Stalingrad
23	25 July 1942	09:00	Il-2		44	9 August 1942	13:32	Il-2	southwest of Kalach-na-Donu
24	25 July 1942	09:12	Il-2		45	9 August 1942	13:32	Il-2	southwest of Kalach-na-Donu
25	26 July 1942	08:56	MiG-1		46	9 August 1942	13:36	Il-2	PQ 3944; 20 km (12 mi) southeast of Kalach-na-Donu
26	27 July 1942	18:30	I-16	8 km (5.0 mi) southwest of Budennovskaya	47	10 August 1942	17:14	MiG-3	northeast of Bereska
27	27 July 1942	18:36	I-16	3 km (1.9 mi) southwest of Budennovskaya	48	10 August 1942	18:00	MiG-3	PQ 4984; 20 km (12 mi) east of Aksay
28	31 July 1942	13:00	I-15? (Note: According to Mathews and Foreman claimed as a Polikarpov I-153.)	3 km (1.9 mi) north of Kalach-na-Donu	49	12 August 1942	04:15	LaGG-3	southwest of Bereska
29	31 July 1942	15:35	Il-2	10 km (6.2 mi) west of Katschalinskaja	50	12 August 1942	04:30	Il-2	PQ 3977; 35 km (22 mi) north-northwest of Kotelnikovo
30	1 August 1942	07:00	LaGG-3	north of Kalach-na-Donu	51♠	13 August 1942	06:15	I-153	PQ 4911; 15 km (9.3 mi) north-northeast of Pitomnik Airfield
31	1 August 1942	07:05	LaGG-3	PQ 39332; 15 km (9.3 mi) southwest of Kalach-na-Donu	52♠	13 August 1942	06:17	I-153	PQ 4911; 15 km (9.3 mi) north-northeast of Pitomnik Airfield
32	1 August 1942	07:16	LaGG-3	northeast of Kalach-na-Donu	53♠	13 August 1942	17:48	Il-2	PQ 3941; 10 km (6.2 mi) southeast of Kalach-na-Donu
33	2 August 1942	05:35	Il-2	PQ 39223; 25 km (16 mi) northwest of Pitomnik Airfield	54♠	13 August 1942	18:05	LaGG-3	PQ 3933; 10 km (6.2 mi) southwest of Kalach-na-Donu
34	2 August 1942	05:50	MiG-1	southeast of Wertjatschij	55♠	13 August 1942	18:10	LaGG-3	PQ 3941; 10 km (6.2 mi) southeast of Kalach-na-Donu
35	2 August 1942	05:55	MiG-1	PQ 39234; 20 km (12 mi) north of Pitomnik Airfield	56	14 August 1942	17:40	LaGG-3	PQ 4922
36	4 August 1942	16:35	MiG-1	PQ 38259; 20 km (12 mi) south of Shutow	57	17 August 1942	15:16	Yak-1	northeast of Kotluban railway station
– 2. Staffel of Jagdgeschwader 53 – Eastern Front — 19 August – 10 September 1942
58	19 August 1942	08:35	LaGG-3	PQ 30853; 25 km (16 mi) northwest of Pitomnik Airfield	73	30 August 1942	16:14	I-180 (Yak-7)	PQ 49392; 25 km (16 mi) south of Stalingrad
59	20 August 1942	17:30	MiG-3	PQ 49533; 30 km (19 mi) south of Stalingrad	74	1 September 1942	08:15? (Note: According to Mathews and Foreman claimed at 08:14.)	LaGG-3	PQ 49394; 25 km (16 mi) south of Stalingrad
60	21 August 1942	04:55	LaGG-3	PQ 49674; 50 km (31 mi) south-southeast of Stalingrad	75	2 September 1942	17:14	LaGG-3	PQ 49173; 45 km (28 mi) east of Stalingrad
61	22 August 1942	10:30? (Note: According to Mathews and Foreman claimed at 10:35.)	I-16	PQ 49473; 30 km (19 mi) south-southeast of Stalingrad	76	3 September 1942	06:45	Yak-1	PQ 49293; 35 km (22 mi) east of Stalingrad
62	23 August 1942	08:25? (Note: According to Mathews and Foreman claimed at 08:35.)	MiG-3	PQ 49124; 15 km (9.3 mi) north of Gumrak	77	3 September 1942	09:15? (Note: According to Mathews and Foreman claimed at 09:25.)	Il-2	PQ 49361; 15 km (9.3 mi) south of Stalingrad
63	23 August 1942	08:52	LaGG-3	PQ 49131; 10 km (6.2 mi) north of Grebenka	78	3 September 1942	12:10? (Note: According to Mathews and Foreman claimed at 12:00.)	LaGG-3	PQ 49174; 10 km (6.2 mi) north of Grebenka
64	23 August 1942	13:35	MiG-3	PQ 49271; 10 km (6.2 mi) east of Stalingrad	79	4 September 1942	13:11? (Note: According to Mathews and Foreman claimed at 13:18.)	LaGG-3	PQ 49282; 10 km (6.2 mi) east of Stalingrad
65	23 August 1942	13:43	MiG-3	PQ 49243; 10 km (6.2 mi) northeast of Stalingrad	80	4 September 1942	13:33? (Note: According to Mathews and Foreman claimed at 13:22.)	LaGG-3	PQ 49254; 10 km (6.2 mi) northeast of Stalingrad
66	24 August 1942	08:25	Yak-4	PQ 49261; 35 km (22 mi) east of Stalingrad	81	6 September 1942	15:35? (Note: According to Mathews and Foreman claimed at 14:36 over an Ilyushin Il-2.)	Pe-2?	PQ 49252; 25 km (16 mi) east of Stalingrad
67	27 August 1942	08:37	I-180 (Yak-7)	PQ 49211; 35 km (22 mi) east of Stalingrad	82	8 September 1942	11:30	Il-2	PQ 49124; 15 km (9.3 mi) north of Gumrak
68	27 August 1942	08:42? (Note: According to Mathews and Foreman claimed at 08:43.)	I-180 (Yak-7)	PQ 49263; 35 km (22 mi) east of Stalingrad	83	8 September 1942	15:30? (Note: According to Mathews and Foreman claimed at 15:20.)	La-5	PQ 49334; 5 km (3.1 mi) south of Stalingrad
69	28 August 1942	05:40	LaGG-3	PQ 49432; 30 km (19 mi) southeast of Stalingrad	84	8 September 1942	15:34? (Note: According to Mathews and Foreman claimed at 15:24.)	La-5	PQ 49321; 25 km (16 mi) east of Stalingrad
70	28 August 1942	14:40	LaGG-3	PQ 50792; 80 km (50 mi) east-northeast of Stalingrad	85	9 September 1942	14:34	Yak-1	PQ 40882; 50 km (31 mi) north of Gumrak
71	28 August 1942	14:48? (Note: According to Mathews and Foreman claimed at 14:46.)	MiG-1	PQ 50783; 65 km (40 mi) northeast of Stalingrad	86	10 September 1942	06:03? (Note: According to Mathews and Foreman claimed at 06:13.)	La-5	PQ 49254; 5 km (3.1 mi) north of Bassargino
72	29 August 1942	12:44	P-40	PQ 49222; 25 km (16 mi) northeast of Stalingrad					

=== Awards ===
- Iron Cross (1939) 2nd and 1st Class
- Honor Goblet of the Luftwaffe on 31 August 1942 as Leutnant and pilot
- German Cross in Gold on 15 October 1942 as Leutnant in the I./Jagdgeschwader 53
- Knight's Cross of the Iron Cross on 3 September 1942 as Leutnant and pilot in the I./Jagdgeschwader 53
