= Osler =

Osler may refer to:

- A. Follett Osler (1808–1903), Birmingham meteorologist and chronologist
- Bennie Osler (1901–1962), South African rugby union footballer
- Malcolm Osler (1919–1971), World War II South African flying ace
- Marcello Osler (1945–2023), Italian racing cyclist
- Several notable members of the Osler family of Canada, including:
  - Britton Bath Osler (1839–1901), Canadian lawyer and prosecutor
  - Sir Edmund Boyd Osler (Ontario politician) (1845–1924), Ontario politician and railway businessman
  - Edmund Boyd Osler (Manitoba politician) (1919–1987), Manitoba politician
  - Sir William Osler (1849–1919), physician and founding professor at Johns Hopkins Hospital
- Osler, Hoskin & Harcourt, a Canadian law firm founded by Britton Bath Osler
- Osler, Saskatchewan, a town in Saskatchewan, Canada, named after Edmund Boyd Osler

== In medicine ==
- Hereditary hemorrhagic telangiectasia, or Osler's disease, named for Sir William Osler
- Osler's nodes, painful, red, raised lesions found on the hands and feet
