= Edward Gracie =

British flying ace of WWII

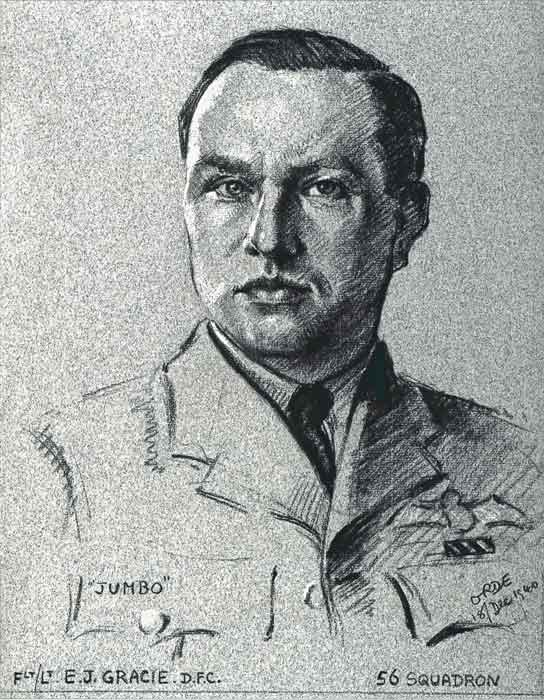
- Portrait of Gracie, made by Cuthbert Orde in December 1940
- Born: 21 September 1911; Acton, London, United Kingdom
- Died: 15 February 1944 (aged 32); Hanover, Germany
- Burial place: Hanover War Cemetery, Germany
- Military career
- Allegiance: United Kingdom
- Branch: Royal Air Force
- Rank: Wing Commander
- Nickname: Jumbo
- Commands: No. 23 Squadron; No. 601 Squadron; No. 126 Squadron; Takali Fighter Wing; No. 169 Squadron
- Conflicts: Second World War: Battle of France; Battle of Britain; Circus offensive; Siege of Malta
- Awards: Distinguished Flying Cross; Mention in Despatches

Edward Gracie, DFC (21 September 1911 – 15 February 1944) was a British flying ace who served with the Royal Air Force (RAF) during the Second World War. He was credited with having shot down at least seven aircraft.

Born to Acton, London, Gracie joined the RAF in 1930 but was dismissed from the service three years later. Rejoining as an officer in the reserve, he was called up for service upon the outbreak of the Second World War. He briefly flew in the Battle of France in May 1940 and, flying with No. 56 Squadron, was heavily engaged in the subsequent Battle of Britain during which he achieved his first aerial victories, until he broke his neck in a crash landing at the end of August. Awarded the Distinguished Flying Cross later in the year, in 1941 he commanded No. 23 Squadron and then No. 601 Squadron.

Gracie was sent to Malta in early in 1942, ferrying a Supermarine Spitfire fighter to the island. Here he commanded No. 126 Squadron during the intensive bombing campaign waged by the German and Italian air forces against Malta. After briefly leading the Takali Fighter Wing he returned to the United Kingdom in July. He commanded No. 169 Squadron from October 1943 until his death over Hanover on 15 February 1944. He was posthumously mentioned in despatches.

== Early life ==
Edward John Gracie, the son of Donald Michael and Mary Elizabeth Gracie, was born in the London suburb of Acton, in the United Kingdom, on 21 September 1911. He joined the Royal Air Force (RAF) in June 1930, on a short service commission. However, he left the RAF three years later due to being dismissed by way of a court martial. The offence that led to his departure from the RAF is not known.

Gracie subsequently worked in sales and in 1935 married Patricia Mary Cawley at Holborn. He secured a commission in the Reserve of Air Force Officers in March 1937 and on the outbreak of the Second World War, was called up for service in the RAF.

== Second World War ==
Posted to No. 79 Squadron in early 1940, Gracie, who was nicknamed 'Jumbo', was promoted to flight lieutenant on 20 March. His squadron, equipped with Hawker Hurricane fighters, was based at Manston and was tasked with the aerial defence of London. In May, it was sent to France to assist the RAF fighter squadrons operating there during the German invasion of that country but was only engaged in the aerial fighting for ten days before returning to the United Kingdom.

=== Battle of Britain ===
In June, Gracie was posted to No. 56 Squadron to serve as one of its flight commanders. At this time, the squadron was regularly flying its Hurricanes from North Weald as escorts to Bristol Blenheim light bombers attacking targets in France. As the Luftwaffe increased its operations against the southeast of England, the squadron switched to an interception role and became heavily engaged in the Battle of Britain. On 10 July Gracie shot down a Messerschmitt Bf 110 heavy fighter off Ramsgate, his first aerial victory. Five days later he probably destroyed a Dornier Do 17 medium bomber off Harwich.

On 20 July Gracie and two other pilots combined to destroy a Junkers Ju 88 medium bomber to the southwest of Clacton. He shot down a Junkers Ju 87 dive bomber off Dover five days later. He damaged two Messerschmitt Bf 109 fighters over Rochford on 13 August and then claimed another Bf 109 as probably destroyed in the vicinity of Eastchurch three days later. This was followed on 18 August with the shooting down of a Bf 110 east of Bradwell. He combined with other pilots to destroy a Do 17 off Cap Gris-Nez on 27 August, and the next day shot down another Do 17 to the east of Southend. His final aerial victories during the Battle of Britain were on 30 August, when he destroyed one Heinkel He 111 medium bomber and damaged a second, both to the north of the squadron's station at North Weald. His own Hurricane was damaged in this engagement and he crash-landed near Halstead. Initially believed to be uninjured, it was subsequently discovered that he had broken his neck and he was promptly hospitalised.

In recognition of his successes during the fighting over the southeast of England, Gracie was awarded the Distinguished Flying Cross (DFC). The published citation read:

This officer has destroyed seven enemy aircraft and damaged another five. By his outstanding leadership, skill and courage, he has proved an excellent example to all.

— London Gazette, No. 34958, 1 October 1940

Gracie returned to No. 56 Squadron a week after the announcement of the award of his DFC. By this time the squadron was operating in a quieter sector and in December, Gracie was promoted to squadron leader in a temporary capacity.

=== Squadron command ===
In March 1941, after a period of leave, Gracie was appointed commander of No. 23 Squadron, at the time operating Blenheims in a night fighter role but due to reequip with the Douglas A-20 Havoc night intruder. On the night of 14 March, on a sortie to Merville in northern France, he claimed a Do 17 as probably destroyed. His tenure as commander was brief, for the following month he took command of No. 601 Squadron. His new unit was engaged in the Circus offensive, flying Hurricanes on sorties to German-occupied Europe. However, in August it was withdrawn to Duxford to begin equipping with the Bell P-39 Airacobra fighter. This American-supplied aircraft was unsuccessful and No. 601 Squadron was the only unit in the RAF to use the type; suffering a high accident rate, the aircraft was used on one operational sortie but otherwise saw no action. Gracie's period of command of the squadron ended in December 1941.

=== Siege of Malta ===
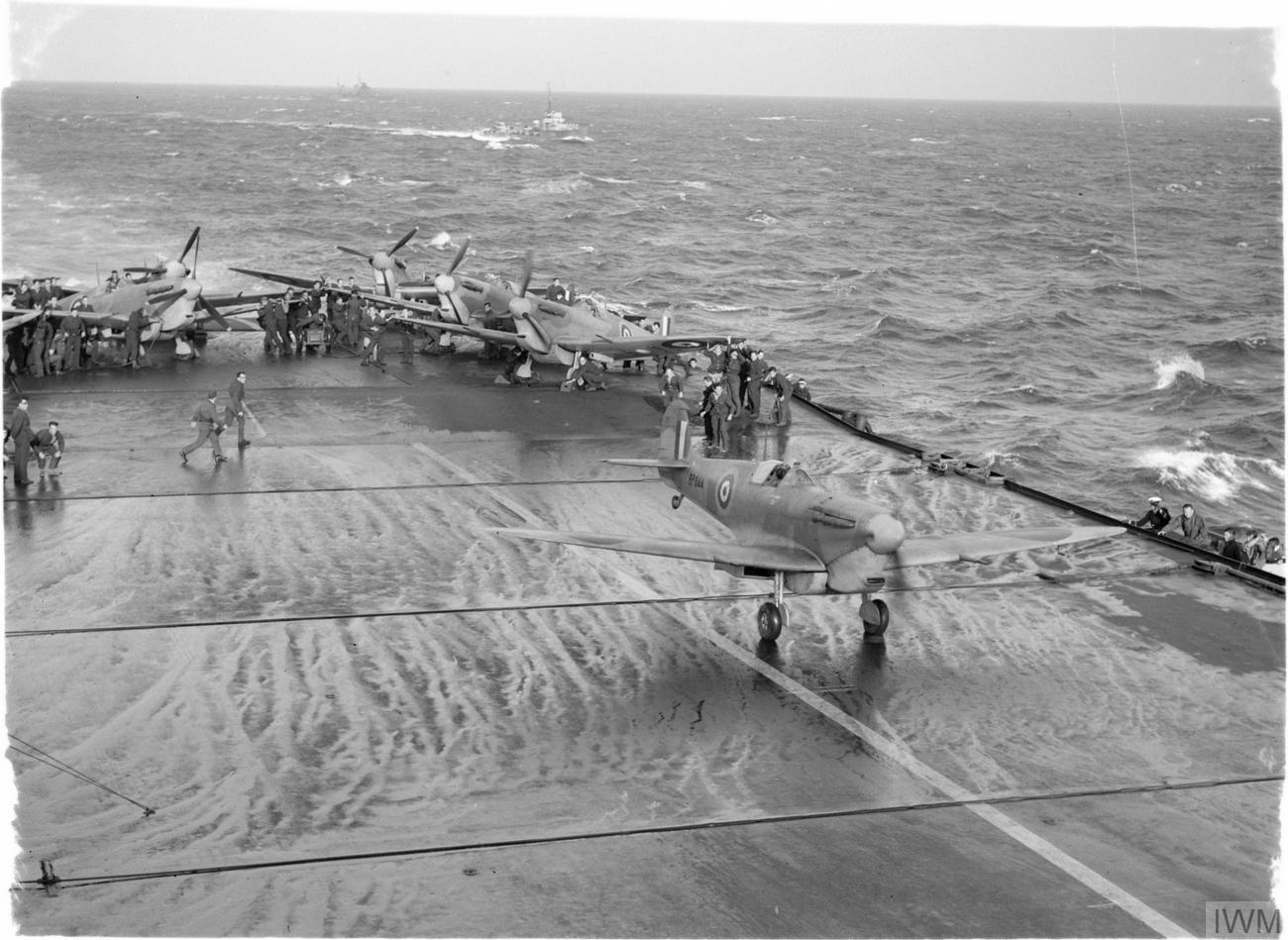
Gracie flying a Spitfire off the flight deck of the aircraft carrier HMS Eagle, 21 March 1942

In early 1942, Gracie was posted to Malta. Sailing abroad the aircraft carrier HMS Eagle, he flew a Supermarine Spitfire fighter off its flight deck on 21 March, arriving safely at Takali airfield on Malta along with eight other pilots. The Spitfires were to form the basis of a newly reformed No. 126 Squadron, to be commanded by Gracie. However, the losses of the existing Spitfires on the island meant that some of the arrivals went to No. 249 Squadron.

On 26 March, Gracie, leading a flight of five Spitfires, damaged a Ju 88 over the island but his own aircraft received return fire and was damaged. On 2 April, he claimed a Ju 88 as probably destroyed. Later in the month, he went to Gibraltar to embark on the aircraft carrier USS Wasp for Operation Calendar. This was an effort to ferry several more Spitfires, with Gracie guiding them, to Malta. On 20 April, he flew the first of 47 Spitfires off Wasp, leading them safely to Malta. The next day, the Luftwaffe mounted a large raid on the island. Flying to intercept Ju 88s after they had released their bombs, he destroyed two, seeing them go into the sea to the north of Malta. Scrambled again later in the day to engage more Ju 88s, he damaged two of them and claimed another as probably destroyed. Two days later he claimed his final aerial victory, a share in a Ju 87 that was shot down over the dockyard at Valletta. At the end of the month, Gracie was promoted to acting wing commander and appointed leader of the Takali fighter wing.

One of Gracie's earliest tasks as wing leader was to prepare Takali Airfield to receive the latest group of reinforcement Spitfires, which landed on 9 May in Operation Bowery. To avoid the newly arrived Spitfires getting caught in Luftwaffe bombing raids after landing, they were to be refueled and rearmed as soon as possible. Within minutes of landing, they were up in the air again, one with Gracie at the controls. Aircraft remained at a premium, and Gracie threatened to have one pilot transferred after he crashed his Spitfire on landing. He ended his service on Malta and returned to the United Kingdom at the end of July. He was well regarded by those under his command; the noted Canadian flying ace George Beurling, who had been commissioned upon Gracie's insistence, regarded him as "Mr Malta".

=== Later war service ===
After a period of rest, Gracie commanded No. 32 Squadron, at the time training for an overseas posting, for a period in September 1942. This was followed with several months of instructing duties at No. 57 Operational Training Unit at Hawarden. In October 1943 Gracie was posted to command of the newly formed No. 169 Squadron. Based at Ayr and equipped with the de Havilland Mosquito heavy fighter, the squadron became part of Bomber Command's No. 100 Group, his new unit was tasked with supporting bombing missions into German-occupied Europe. After a period of training, it became operational in January 1944, Gracie flying on its first sortie to Hamburg. Flying a sortie over Hanover on 15 February 1944, Gracie's Mosquito was attacked by a German night fighter. While his navigator was able to bale out, Gracie was killed. Posthumously mentioned in despatches on 8 June 1944, he is buried at the Hanover War Cemetery.

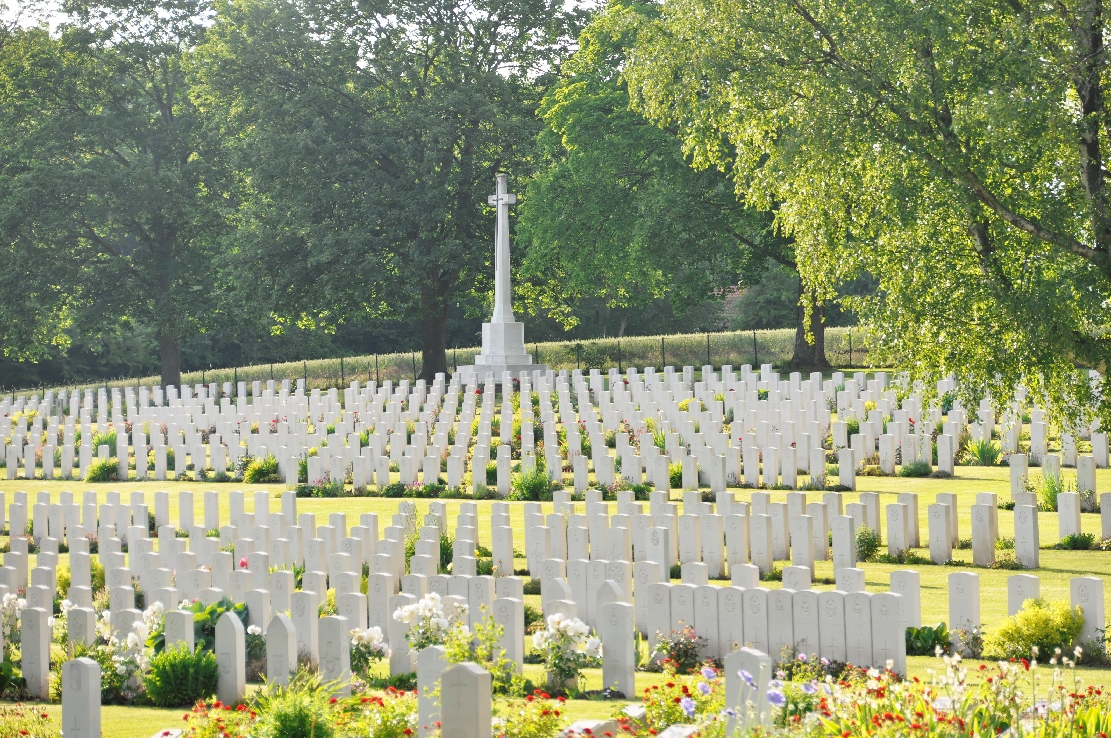
Gracie is buried at Hanover War Cemetery in Germany

At the time of his death, Gracie was credited with having shot down seven German aircraft, with an addition three shared with other pilots. He is also credited with having probably destroyed five aircraft and damaging six.
