= Norman Taylor =

Norman Taylor may refer to:

- Norman Taylor (rower) (1899–1980), Canadian
- Norman Taylor (scientist) (1900–1975), New Zealand
- Norman Taylor (RAF officer) (1919–1948), British flying ace of the Second World War
- Norman Taylor (basketball) (1965–2020), American basketball player
