= John Bisdee (RAF officer) =

British flying ace of WWII

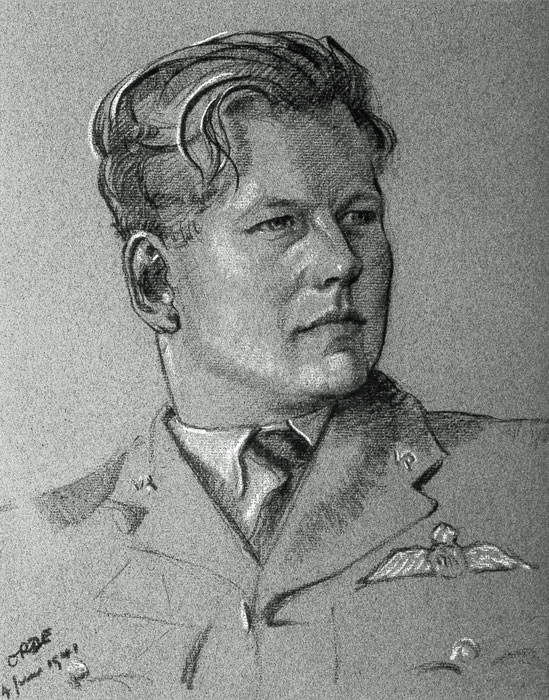
- Portrait of Bisdee, made by Cuthbert Orde in 1941
- Born: 20 November 1915; Weston-super-Mare, Somerset, United Kingdom
- Died: 21 October 2000 (aged 84)
- Burial place: St Luke's Church, Milland, Sussex, United Kingdom
- Military career
- Allegiance: United Kingdom
- Branch: Royal Air Force
- Service years: 1939–1945
- Rank: Group Captain
- Commands: No. 601 Squadron; Military Governor of Lampedusa; No. 323 Wing
- Conflicts: Second World War: Battle of Britain; Circus offensive; Siege of Malta
- Awards: Officer of the Order of the British Empire; Distinguished Flying Cross; Mention in Despatches (2)
- Other work: Business management

John Bisdee, OBE, DFC (20 November 1915 – 21 October 2000) was a British flying ace who served in the Royal Air Force (RAF) during the Second World War. He was credited with having shot down at least ten aircraft.

Born in Weston-super-Mare in Somerset, Bisdee was working for Unilever when he was called up for service in the RAF on the outbreak of the Second World War. Posted to No. 609 Squadron, he flew in the Battle of Britain and achieved a number of aerial victories during this time. He later was involved in the RAF's Circus offensive and was awarded the Distinguished Flying Cross just before being assigned to instructing duties. He appeared in the 1942 film The First of the Few before being sent to Malta as commander of No. 601 Squadron. After a period of service on the island, the squadron went to North Africa where it was involved in the campaign in the Western Desert. In 1943 he was appointed the Military Governor of Lampedusa. The majority of the remainder of his war service was spent in training and as commander of No. 323 Wing in Italy. Made an Officer of the Order of the British Empire in June 1945, he was released from the RAF later that year as a group captain. In the postwar period he resumed working for Unilever and later became chairman of one of its subsidiaries. Retiring in 1976, he died on 21 October 2000, aged 84.

== Early life ==
John Derek Bisdee was born on 20 November 1915 in Weston-super-Mare in Somerset, England. His father, T. E. Bisdee, was a senior officer of the Duke of Cornwall's Light Infantry. He went to Marlborough College before going on to the University of Cambridge, studying at the Corpus Christi College. Bisdee subsequently went to Spain to learn the language but returned to England after the outbreak of civil war there. He commenced a management internship at Unilever and while working there, he joined the Royal Air Force Volunteer Reserve.

== Second World War ==
On the outbreak of the Second World War, Bisdee was called up for service with the Royal Air Force (RAF). Once his training was completed in December 1939, he was commissioned as a pilot officer and posted to No. 609 Squadron at the end of the month. His new squadron had only just become operational with Supermarine Spitfire fighters and, stationed at Kinloss, was flying convoy patrols. In May 1940, the squadron shifted south to Northolt from where it helped provide aerial cover for the evacuation of the British Expeditionary Force from Dunkirk.

=== Battle of Britain ===
During the early phase of the Battle of Britain, No. 609 Squadron was tasked with protecting Southampton and Portland, as well as the convoys plying the southern coastline. Bisdee made his first claim on 18 July, for a half share in a damaged Junkers Ju 88 medium bomber. On 11 August, by which time the squadron was stationed at Middle Wallop, he shot down a Messerschmitt Bf 110 heavy fighter some 15 miles (24 km) to the southeast of Swanage. Two weeks later he damaged a Bf 110 to the west of Swanage. When the Luftwaffe began to focus its attacks on London, No. 609 Squadron was called upon to assist and on 7 September, Bisdee destroyed one Bf 110 and damaged a second to the southwest of the city.

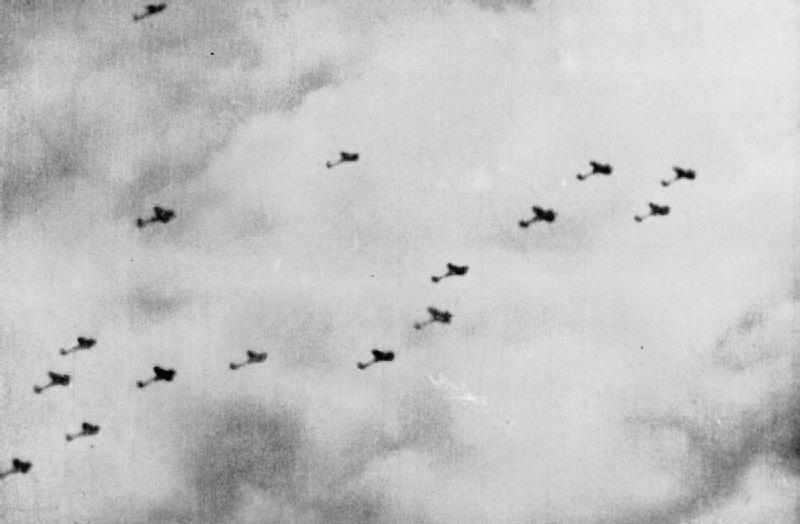
Gun camera footage from Bisdee's Spitfire as he intercepted a group of Luftwaffe Heinkel He 111 medium bombers that had just attacked an aircraft factory at Southampton on 26 September 1940

Bisdee probably destroyed a Heinkel He 111 medium bomber over Bournemouth on 26 September and the following day, shared in the destruction of a Bf 110 in the Swanage vicinity. He claimed a Messerschmitt Bf 109 fighter as probably destroyed near The Needles on 30 September. His final aerial victory of the battle was on 7 October, when he destroyed a Bf 110 to the north of Portland. The following month, the squadron shifted to west to Warmwell where it saw out the winter months. At the end of the year, Bisdee was promoted to flying officer.

=== Circus offensive ===
In February 1941, No. 609 Squadron moved back east, to Biggin Hill, from where it began offensive operations to France with its new Spitfire Mk IIa fighters. Bisdee, who had been mentioned in despatches on 17 March, shared in the destruction of a Bf 109 near Dunkirk on 21 May. The following month, on 17 June, he shot down a Bf 109 near Le Touquet. This was followed five days later with another Bf 109 destroyed, this time over Dunkirk. On 24 June, also near Dunkirk, he claimed a Bf 109 as probably destroyed. He shot down a Bf 109 over Le Touquet on 9 July, while flying in an escort role for Short Stirling heavy bombers attacking a power station at Béthune. Shortly afterwards, Bisdee was awarded the Distinguished Flying Cross (DFC) in recognition of his successes; the citation, published in The London Gazette, read:

This officer has led his flight and section with great skill and determination. He has participated in a large number of operational flights against the enemy and has destroyed at least six of their aircraft besides damaging many others. He has set a fine example.

— London Gazette, No. 35217, 11 July 1941

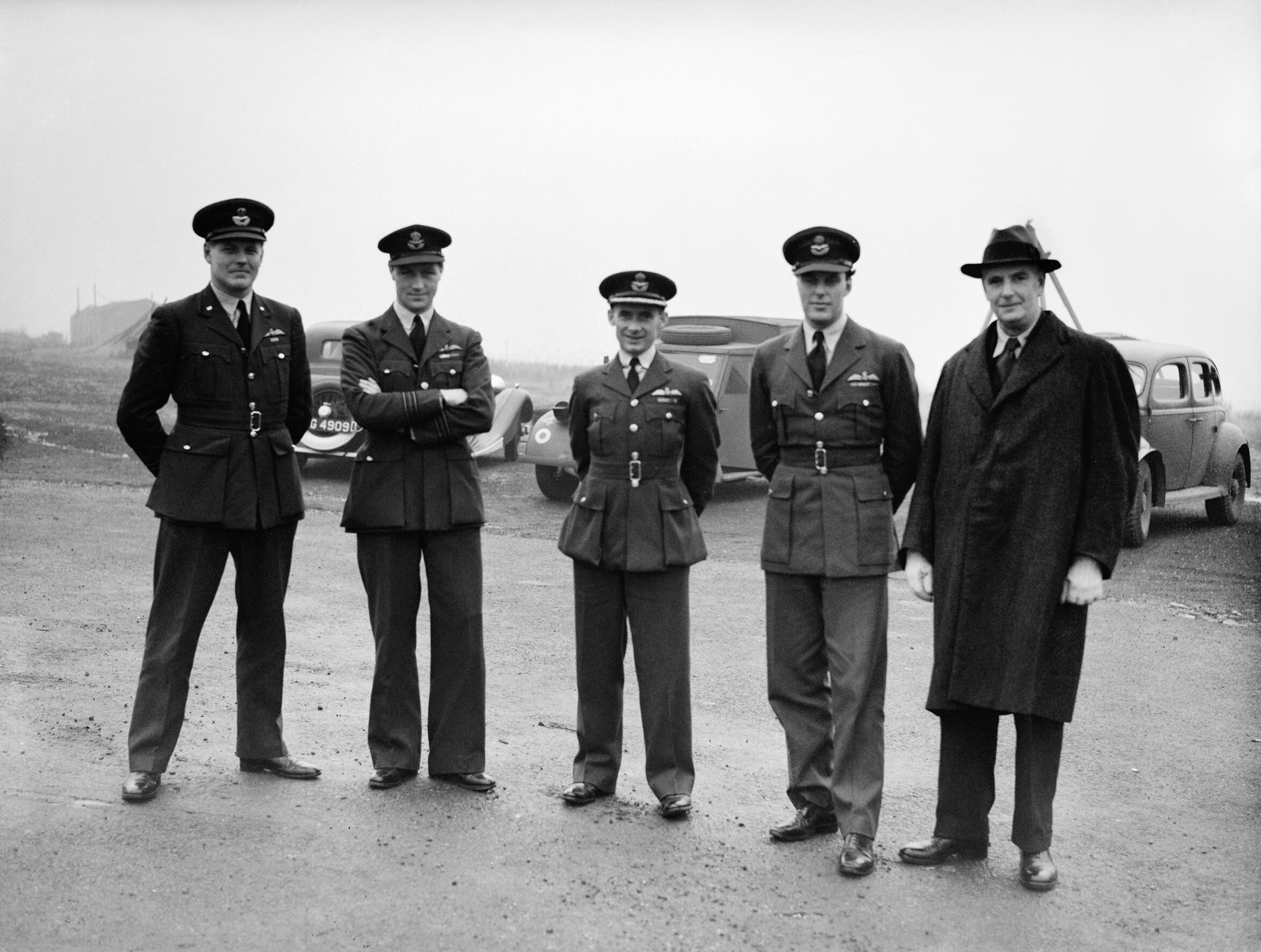
In a photograph taken on the occasion of the presentation of No. 609 Squadron's crest, Bisdee stands on the left in this group, next to the squadron's commander, Paul Richey

Bisdee, having flown on operations for 18 months, was rested at the end of July and sent to No. 61 Operational Training Unit (OTU) to serve as an instructor. During his time at this OTU, he was involved in the filming of The First of the Few, which was released in 1942. On 10 December, he was promoted to flight lieutenant.

=== Siege of Malta ===
In early March 1942, Bisdee returned to operations with a promotion to acting squadron leader and command of No. 601 Squadron. This was reequipping with Spitfires at Acaster Malbis, having unsuccessfully used the Bell P-39 Airacobra fighter for the previous several months. Once it was returned to operational status, it was selected as one of two squadrons of Spitfires to be sent to Malta to reinforce the struggling aerial defences of the island. The mission to transport the Spitfires to Malta was designated Operation Calendar; the squadron embarked the American aircraft carrier USS Wasp at Glasgow and sailed on 14 April. The operation commenced on 20 April, when a total of 47 Spitfires were flown off the carrier for an approximately four-hour flight to Malta. The aircraft of Bisdee's squadron safely arrived at Luqa at around 10:00am.

Bisdee was in action almost immediately, being scrambled to intercept a midday raid on Ta Kali the next day; he managed to destroy a Ju 88 but was in turn himself shot down by Leutnant Walter Zellot of the Luftwaffe's Jagdgeschwader 53. Bisdee bailed out, but he reported that he was only under his parachute for around ten seconds before he entered the sea head first; the harness of his parachute had caught up about one of his legs. He took to his inflatable dinghy and was able to reach Malta's coastline after six hours of paddling. In a semi-conscious state when he was found, he needed to convalesce for several days.

Not returning to duty until 2 May, that day Bisdee led a dawn patrol from Ta Kali although the airfield was bombed while his aircraft was on the ground. In the evening of 10 May he destroyed a Cant Z.1007bis medium bomber of the Regia Aeronautica (Royal Italian Air Force) near Kalkara. The next day, he shot down a Bf 109, but this was deemed to only be probably destroyed. At the end of June, with the Luftwaffe and Regia Aeronautica's offensive against Malta on the wane, the squadron was transferred to the Desert Air Force, which was in need of more aircraft.

=== Later war service ===
Initially based at Mariut in Egypt, No. 601 Squadron was tasked mostly with armed reconnaissance sorties behind the German frontlines. Bisdee damaged a Messerschmitt Me 210 heavy fighter near Aboukir on 5 July, his final aerial victory. His period in command of the squadron ended on 21 August and he was posted to the RAF headquarters in the Middle East, where he was employed as a Fighter Training officer. In early 1943 he was promoted to acting wing commander and sent to Tunisia as a staff officer for day fighters. He subsequently worked on the aerial planning for protection of the shipping convoys for the Allied invasion of Sicily.

In a precursor operation prior to the landings at Sicily, the Italian-held Mediterranean island of Lampedusa was secured on 12 June. Bisdee was appointed as its military governor, a role he fulfilled until late July, when he handed responsibility over to an Allied Military Government. Following this, he was posted to Bône, in Algeria, where he was involved in the training of Free French pilots. He was subsequently appointed commander of No. 323 Wing, which operated from Foggia in the south of Italy. He had a diverse array of aircraft under his command; it included Spitfires, Bristol Beaufighter heavy fighters and Vickers Wellington medium bombers working in an anti-shipping role, and a night fighter squadron. Part of his command's function was air search and rescue operations over the Adriatic Sea, and for this he controlled a number of seaplanes, including Italian aircraft based on a lake near Gargano. He was mentioned in despatches for a second time on 8 June 1944.

In the 1945 Birthday Honours, Bisdee was appointed an Officer of the Order of the British Empire. He left the RAF later in the year, holding the rank of group captain. He was credited with having destroyed ten aircraft, two shared with other pilots. He also probably destroyed four more aircraft, and damaged a further four, one of these being shared with another pilot.

== Later life ==
Returning to civilian life, Bisdee resumed working in the management of Unilever. He worked on building up the company's interests in France and Italy in the postwar period and in 1951, he was made a sales director for D. & W. Gibbs, a Unilever subsidiary. He eventually became its chairman. Bisdee retired to Sussex in 1976 and he died on 21 October 2000. Having been cremated, his remains were interred in the cemetery at St Luke's Church in Milland, Sussex.
