= Msus Airfield =

Airfield near Msus, Libya, 1941–1942

Msus Airfield
- Msus in Libya

Site information
- Type: Military airfield
- Operator: Royal Air Force; Luftwaffe
- Condition: Abandoned

Location
- Shown within Libya
- Coordinates: 31°34′30″N 21°01′45″E

Site history
- In use: 1941 - 1942
- Battles/wars: North African Campaign

Msus Airfield was a World War II airfield located near Msus in Cyrenaica, Libya. It was established in 1941 for use by the Royal Air Force, and supported the Eighth Army advance in Libya until German capture in early 1942. However, following poor weather and constant strafing, it remained unused until Allied recapture by late 1942.

== History ==
Msus Airfield was likely established sometime in 1941. It composed of two airfields, Msus No. 1 and Msus No. 2. Msus No. 1 was equipped with two firm natural surface runways comprising clay and gravel, measuring 1100 x 275 meters and 1100 x 185 meters. Msus No. 2 was equipped with two firm natural surface runways both measuring 915 x 185. The airfield supported Msus No. 1, and was occasionally used, leading to sparse vegetation growth of camel shrubs. There were no permanent infrastructure and dispersal facilities at either airfields. Throughout 1941, Msus Airfield operated as a Royal Air Force (RAF) forward landing ground. Beginning on 3 April 1941, Msus Airfield was used by Hawker Hurricanes from the Royal Australian Air Force (RAAF). By December 1941, Msus Airfield equipped with dispersed parking and fifty thousand gallons of gasoline, two days after the Eighth Army arrived in the area to be supported by units from the airfield. Shortly thereafter, eleven fighter squadrons, a close air support squadron, and Bristol Blenheim bombers began arriving. The Msus No. 2 Airfield was also used to offload the amount of squadrons based at No. 1. Due to the vast area of responsibility, the distance from England, and the varying locations of such landing grounds, Msus Airfield had an inadequate amount of weapons. Furthermore, sandstorms were known to damage weapons, while rough terrain wore down gun mounts.

By 24 December 1941, four squadrons of the RAF and South African Air Force (SAAF) was based there, using Curtiss P-40 Warhawks. By January 1942, Axis reconnaissance aircraft began observing the airfield, leading to constant anti-aircraft activity. On 11 January 1942, the airfield was occupied by up to 25 to 30 British multi-engine aircraft. On 25 January 1942, Msus Airfield was captured by German troops led by Erwin Rommel, including the seizure of 30 British Valentine tanks. Afterwards, the airfield was used by the Luftwaffe to support forward operations, with Kurierstaffel Afrika-based there using the Fieseler Fi 156 Storch to transport personnel and supplies. On 28 January 1942, two Fi 156s of the unit at the airfield were strafed on the ground by British fighter aircraft. Additionally, a Henschel Hs 123 was also damaged. The German capture and usage of Msus led to heavy fighting northeast of the airfield, with RAF Hurricanes intercepting a formation of 30 dive bombers and fighters from the Regia Aeronautica and Luftwaffe on 27 January. Four were shot down, and three were left damaged. Throughout late January, the weather consisted of sandstorms and rain, with occasional fair-weather, creating further unsuitable conditions for aircraft.

From February through October 1942, Msus Airfield remained unused. On 20 November 1942, British forces occupied the airfield. By 26 November 1942, two RAF fighter wings began operating from Msus, aimed at restoring Allied air superiority over the forward area.

== Units ==
The following units that were based at Msus Airfield:

Royal Air Force

- No. 6 Squadron RAF detachment between 24 February 1941 and 4 April 1941, equipped with the Hawker Hurricane I
- No. 33 Squadron RAF between 1 January 1942 and 15 January 1942, then 22 January 1942 and 24 January 1942, equipped with the Hawker Hurricane I
- No. 92 Squadron RAF between 25 November 1942 and 4 December 1942, equipped with the Supermarine Spitifre VB & VC
- No. 94 Squadron RAF between 24 December 1941 and 12 January 1942, then 23 January 1942 and 25 January 1942, equipped with the Hawker Hurricane IIB
- No. 112 Squadron RAF between 21 December 1941 and 13 January 1942 equipped with the Tomahawk IIA & IIB, then 21 January 1942 and 24 January 1942 equipped with the Kittyhawk IA
- No. 145 Squadron RAF between 25 November 1942 and 4 December 1942, equipped with the Supermarine Spitfire VB
- No. 208 Squadron RAF detachment between 19 December 1941 and 3 February 1942, equipped with the Audax
- No. 229 Squadron RAF between 21 December 1941 and 23 December 1941, equipped with the Hawker Hurricane IIC
- No. 238 Squadron RAF between 26 December 1941 and 1 January 1942, equipped with the Hawker Hurricane IIC
- No. 250 Squadron RAF between 27 December 1941 and 12 January 1942, then 21 January 1942 and 24 January 1942, equipped with the Tomahawk IIB
- No. 260 Squadron RAF between 24 December 1941 and 12 January 1942, equipped with the Hawker Hurricane I
- No. 274 Squadron RAF detachment between 27 December 1941 and 24 January 1942, equipped with the Hawker Hurricane IIB
- No. 601 Squadron RAF between 25 November 1942 and 4 December 1942, equipped with the Supermarine Spirfire VC
