= Robert Turkington =

Robert Turkington DSO DFC*
- Born: 1920
- Died: 29 July 1945 (aged 24–25)
- Military career
- Allegiance: United Kingdom
- Branch: Royal Air Force Volunteer Reserve
- Service years: 1940–1945
- Rank: Squadron leader
- Nickname: Paddy
- Service number: 117519
- Units: No. 43 Squadron RAF; No. 241 Squadron RAF; No. 601 Squadron RAF
- Conflicts: Second World War

Robert Wilkinson "Paddy" Turkington, DSO, DFC & Bar (1920 – 29 July 1945) was a Northern Irish Second World War Royal Air Force (RAF) fighter pilot and flying ace. He had 9 confirmed kills, 3 shared kills, 1 probable kill, and 4 damaged aircraft; some sources credit him with 11 kills.

== Early life and education ==
Turkington was born in 1920 in Mhow, British Raj or in Derrytrasna, County Armagh, Northern Ireland. Between 1933 and 1939, he was educated at Lurgan College, a grammar school in Craigavon, County Armagh.

== Military service ==
Turkington enlisted in the Royal Air Force Volunteer Reserve (RAFVR) in 1940, and trained as a pilot in Canada. On 1 October 1942, he was promoted from pilot officer (on probation) to the war substantive rank of flying officer (on probation). He was promoted to war substantive squadron leader on 7 January 1944.

Turkington first served with No. 43 Squadron RAF, and flew a Hawker Hurricane with them on the Dieppe Raid of 19 August 1942. By November 1942, he was fighting over North Africa. He converted to the Supermarine Spitfire in 1943, and was involved in fighting over Sicily and Italy. By November 1943, he was a fighter ace, with at least 5 confirmed kills. He flew a total of 766 operational hours with 43 Squadron. He was then a flight commander in No. 241 Squadron RAF, during which he destroyed four Messerschmitt Bf 109s. From July 1944 to January 1945, he was officer commanding No. 601 Squadron RAF. Following Victory in Europe, he was based in Italy with No. 241 Squadron RAF.

In January 1944, he was awarded the Distinguished Flying Cross (DFC). In September 1944, he was awarded a bar to his DFC (i.e. awarded the medal for the second time). In April 1945, he was awarded the Distinguished Service Order (DSO). He also received the 1939–1945 Star, Africa Star with "North Africa 1942-43" clasp, Italy Star, Defence Medal and War Medal 1939–1945. His medals sold in 2017 for £22,000.

Having been killed in a flying accident on 29 July 1945, he is buried in the Padua War Cemetery, Italy.
