= Hugh Riddle =

World War II Royal Air Force fighter pilot

Hugh Joseph Riddle
- Born: 24 May 1912; London
- Died: 16 April 2009 (Aged 97); Pierrevert, France
- Relatives: Christopher Riddle
- Military career
- Allegiance: United Kingdom
- Branch: Royal Air Force
- Service years: 1938–1946
- Rank: Squadron Leader
- Nickname: Huseph
- Conflicts: World War II: Battle of Britain
- Other work: Portrait painting (Royal Society of Portrait Painters)

Squadron Leader Hugh Joseph "Huseph" Riddle RAF (24 May 1912 – 16 April 2009) was a World War II Royal Air Force fighter pilot during the Battle of Britain.

== Early life ==
Hugh Joseph Riddle, known as "Huseph", was born in London on 24 May 1912 and was educated at Harrow School.

== Air Force career ==
Riddle joined No. 601 Squadron RAF, part of the Auxiliary Air Force in early 1938 and was called to full-time service in October 1939.

Riddle flew with 601 Sqn throughout the Battle of Britain, along with his younger brother "Jack".The squadron returned to Tangmere on 2 September and then moved to Exeter in 10 Group on 7 September 1940. F/O Jack Riddle scored one kill before and one kill after joining No 601 Squadron during the Battle of Britain, while Hugh Riddle scored a single kill on 11 July 1940 flying with No 601 Squadron.

Both Hugh and Jack Riddle were promoted to Squadron Leader on the same date: 1 December 1941.

== Family ==
In 1937 Riddle married Joan, known as "Tinker". Tinker was the daughter of Claude Johnson, first Managing Director of Rolls-Royce Ltd and first Secretary of the RAC. Riddle and Tinker had three children, all born after the war, Hugh ("Ras"), Victoria ("Wicky") and Arabel. When Riddle retired in 1974, the couple moved to France. Tinker died suddenly in 1994.

== Later life ==
After the war, Riddle returned to portrait painting. He became a member of the Royal Society of Portrait Painters and exhibited at the Society's Summer Exhibitions and at some Royal Academy exhibitions. Riddle painted the Queen in 1965 for the RAF Regiment. In 1977 he was commissioned by the Royal Household to paint Prince Edward as a Silver Wedding present for the Queen and Prince Philip.

Huseph Riddle died on 16 April 2009, aged 97 in Pierrevert, France.
