= Christopher Riddle =

World War II Royal Air Force fighter pilot

Christopher John Henry Riddle
- Born: Christopher John Henry Riddle; 4 April 1914; Buckinghamshire
- Died: 8 August 2009 (aged 95); Chichester
- Military career
- Allegiance: United Kingdom
- Branch: Royal Air Force
- Service years: 1938–1946
- Rank: Squadron Leader
- Nickname: Jack
- Units: No. 601 Squadron RAF; No. 10 Group RAF
- Conflicts: World War II: Battle of Britain
- Other work: Timber, Textiles

Squadron Leader Christopher John Henry Riddle RAF (1914–2009) was a World War II Royal Air Force fighter pilot during the Battle of Britain.

== Early life ==
Christopher Riddle, known as Jack, was born in Buckinghamshire on 4 April 1914 and was educated at Harrow School from 1928 to 1931. He was a member of White's club in London.

== Air Force career ==
Riddle joined No. 601 Squadron RAF, part of the Auxiliary Air Force in early 1938 and was called to full-time service in October 1939.

Riddle flew with 601 Sqn throughout the Battle of Britain, along with his older brother Hugh. On 27 May 1940, over Dunkirk, Riddle probably destroyed a Bf 110. He shared a Bf 110 on 11 July and a Do 17 on 4 September. He was promoted to Flight Lieutenant on 4 October 1940.

In January 1941 Riddle was posted to No. 10 Group RAF (RAF Box) as a Sector Controller. He was mentioned in dispatches in March 1941. He was promoted to Squadron Leader on 1 December 1941. Later in the war he was in the Far East at HQ Air South East Asia Command, in Ceylon and later Singapore. Riddle was released from the RAF in 1946 as a Squadron Leader.

== Later life ==
Riddle was later with an international trading group and his main work was buying Baltic timber for the Australian market. Riddle later had his own textile company. He was involved with the Billy Fiske Memorial Window at Boxgrove Priory.

Jack Riddle died on 8 August 2009, aged 95 in Chichester.
