= No. 169 Squadron RAF =

Defunct flying squadron of the Royal Air Force

- Active: 15 June 1942 – 10 August 1945
- Country: United Kingdom
- Branch: Royal Air Force
- Mottos: Hunt and destroy

Insignia
- Squadron Badge heraldry: In front of a hurt, a hunting horn in bend The hurt signifies the night and the horn the intruder role
- Squadron Codes: VI (Oct 1943 – Aug 1945); Perhaps as early as 1942

No. 169 Squadron RAF was a tactical reconnaissance and later a night intruder squadron of the Royal Air Force during World War II.

== History ==
No. 169 squadron was formed on 15 June 1942 at RAF Twinwood Farm as a tactical reconnaissance squadron from 'B' flight of 613 Squadron, and took over their North American Mustang Mk.Is. The squadron moved to RAF Duxford in December 1942 and began coastal reconnaissance and ground attack missions. The squadron disbanded at RAF Middle Wallop on 30 September 1943, only to reform again the following day at RAF Ayr as a night intruder squadron, led by Wing Commander Edward Gracie, flying de Havilland Mosquitoes and a single Bristol Beaufighter, while the squadron also had some Airspeed Oxfords on strength for training and communication.

In December 1943, the squadron joined No. 100 Group at Little Snoring. The squadron re-equipped with Mosquito II night fighters in January 1944 and commenced night intruder operations against German night fighters. The squadron disbanded on 10 August 1945 at RAF Great Massingham.

== Notable squadron member ==
- Keith Miller

== Aircraft operated ==
Aircraft operated by No. 169 Squadron RAF
From	To	Aircraft	Variant
Jun 1942	Sep 1943	North American Mustang	Mk.I
Oct 1943	Jan 1944	de Havilland Mosquito	Mk. III
Jan 1944	Jul 1944	de Havilland Mosquito	Mk.II
Jun 1944	Aug 1945	de Havilland Mosquito	Mk.VI
Jan 1945	Aug 1945	de Havilland Mosquito	Mk.XIX
