= No. 601 Squadron RAuxAF =

No. 601 (County of London) Squadron RAuxAF
- No. 601 Squadron badge
- Active: 14 October 1925 – May 1945; June 1946 – 10 March 1957; 20 April 2017 – present
- Country: United Kingdom
- Branch: Royal Air Force
- Part of: Royal Auxiliary Air Force
- Nicknames: The Millionaires' Squadron; The Millionaires' Mob; The Legion
- Motto: None
- Post 1951 Squadron insignia
- Battle honours: France & Low Countries, 1940*; Dunkirk*; Battle of Britain, 1940*; Home Defence, 1940–42; Fortress Europe, 1941–42; Malta, 1942; Egypt & Libya, 1942*; El Alamein*; El Hamma; North Africa, 1943*; Sicily, 1943*; Italy, 1943–45*; Anzio & Nettuno; Gustav Line; Gothic Line; Honours marked with an asterisk* are those that are emblazoned on the Squadron Standard

Commanders
- Officer Commanding: Air Vice Marshal Malcolm Brecht CB, CBE

Insignia
- Squadron Badge heraldry: A winged sword
- Squadron Codes: YN (January 1939 – September 1939); UF (September 1939 – April 1942, April 1942 – August 1945); 1 & 3 (Apr 1942); RAH (May 1946 – 1949); HT (1949 – April 1951)

Number 601 (County of London) Squadron is a squadron of the RAF Reserves, based in London. The squadron took part in the Battle of Britain, during which the first Americans to fly in World War II were members of the squadron.

Reactivated in 2017, it is a specialist squadron "tapping into the talents of leaders from industry, academia and research to advise and shape and inspire [the RAF]".

== History ==
=== Formation ===
No. 601 Squadron was formed at RAF Northolt on 14 October 1925 when a group of wealthy aristocratic young men, all of whom were amateur aviators, decided to form themselves into a Reserve Squadron of the RAF after a meeting in White's Club, London. The original officers were picked by the first commanding officer, Lord Edward Grosvenor, youngest son of Hugh Grosvenor, 1st Duke of Westminster. Grosvenor tested potential recruits by plying them with alcohol to see if they would behave inappropriately. Grosvenor wanted officers "of sufficient presence not to be overawed by him and of sufficient means not to be excluded from his favourite pastimes, eating, drinking and White's". The squadron was known in its earlier days as "The Millionaires' Squadron", a nametag gained because of a reputation for filling their ranks with the very 'well-heeled'. Most of these affluent young pilots had little regard for the rigid discipline of the regular service; they lined their uniform tunics with bright red silk and wore blue ties rather than the regulation black. They played polo on brand-new Brough Superior motor cycles, drove fast sports cars (the squadron car park was said to resemble a Concours d'Elegance), and most of the pilots owned their own private aircraft.

=== Second World War ===
The Squadron became a day fighter unit in 1940 and operated both the Hawker Hurricane and the Supermarine Spitfire. Aircrew attrition and transfers to other units, war quickly took its toll on the pre-war personnel and as replacements were drafted in from all walks of life and all parts of the Commonwealth to cover casualties and promotions, the Squadron became as cosmopolitan as any other.

=== Postwar operations ===
The unit reformed in 1946 as a fighter squadron within the Royal Auxiliary Air Force (RAuxAF), initially equipped with the Spitfire, followed by the jet powered De Havilland Vampire and the Gloster Meteor twin-jet. The squadron disbanded along with all other RAuxAF units during the defence cuts of early 1957.

== Present ==
Reforming on 20 April 2017 at RAF Northolt, 601 Squadron is now a Specialist Support Squadron of the RAuxAF. The 3 principal roles of the Squadron are to provide advice to the Chief of the Air Staff and the RAF to help address important issues; to provide access to new networks that the RAF has not traditionally been connected with; and to develop advocates for the RAF. Among the specialists appointed Honorary Group Captains to the squadron are:

- Edward Cadogan, Viscount Chelsea –2026
- Tariq Iftikhar Ahmed 2026–2028
- Jonathan Stuart Christian Andrews –2026
- Morgan Sebastian Bassett-James 2026–2028
- Colonel Paul Eli Beaver –2026
- Hon. Kevin William Billings OBE –2026
- Kenneth Roderick Bristow –2026
- Squadron Leader Peter Charles Brown –2026
- Wing Commander John Ian Chappell, MBE 2026–2028
- William Francis Charnley –2026
- Christopher James Dell –2026
- Professor Kieran Jude Fernandes 2026–2028
- Mrs Elbrun Kweilen Hatleskog 2026–2028
- David Mark Hildyard 2026–2028
- Richard Anthony Lewis –2026
- Paul MacPherson 2026–2028
- James Peter Martin 2026–2028
- John Charles Edward Michaelson –2026
- Eamonn Mark Molloy –2026
- Paul Newmann –2026
- Scott Noble 2026–2028
- Andrew Charles Palmer –2026
- Air Commodore Delva Frances Patman –2026
- Sir Peter Rigby –2026
- Donald Austin Robert –2026
- William Bruce Roper –2027
- Anita Teresa Bernie –2027
- Sally Bridgeland –2027
- Flight Lieutenant Joanna Mary Salter –2027
- Helen Kathryn Selby –2027
- Karan Bilimoria, Baron Bilimoria –2027
- Helen Louise Gripton –2027
- Guy Phillips Austin –2027
- Peter Lionel Raleigh Hewitt –2027
- Professor Adam Jason Beaumont –2027
- Duncan Roy Barber –2027
- Paul Bruce Dickinson –2027
- Dame Dawn Elizabeth Childs 2025–2028
- Donagh Patrick McCullagh 2025–2028
- Sir Martin Nicholas Sweeting 2025–2028

== Aircraft operated ==
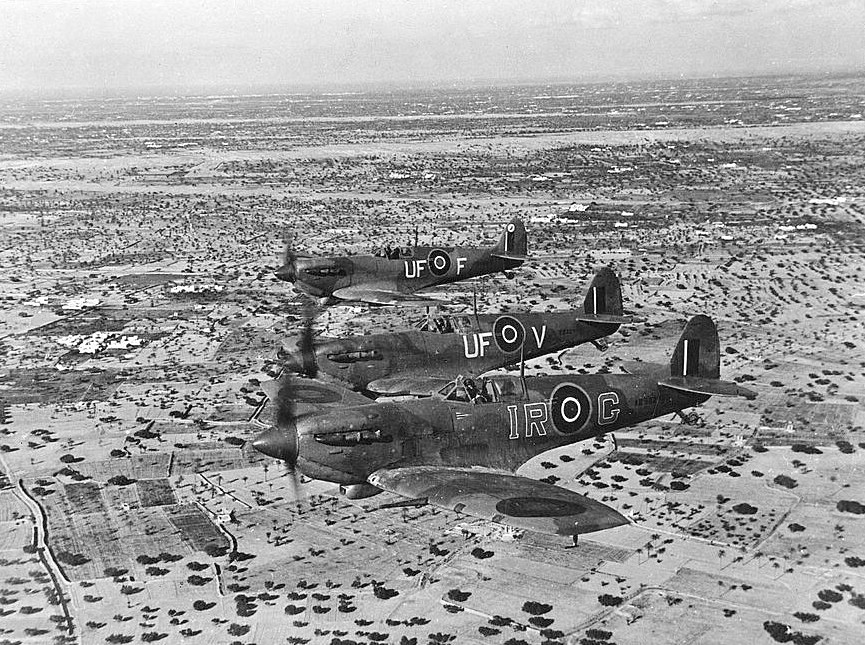
Two 601 Sqn Spitfire Vb over Djerba Island in early 1943, led by W/Cdr. I.R. Gleed in his personal Spitfire marked IR-G.

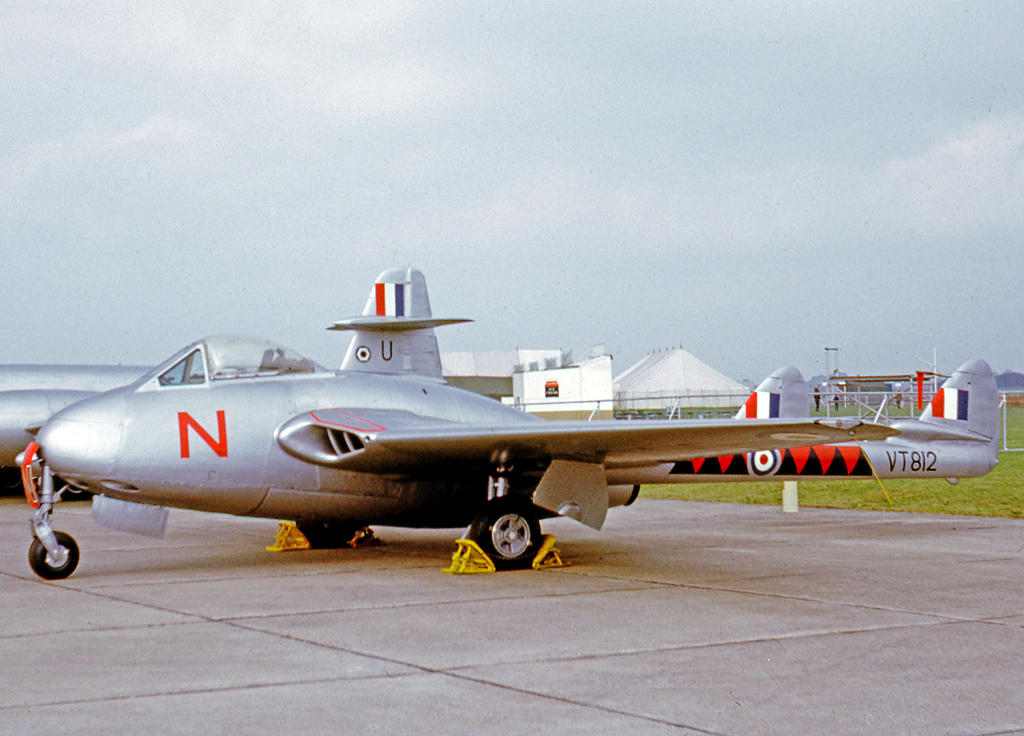
De Havilland Vampire F.3 wearing the unit markings of No. 601 Squadron

Aircraft operated by no. 601 Squadron, data from
From	To	Aircraft	Version
May 1926	June 1926	Avro 504	K, N
June 1926	October 1930	Airco DH.9A	
November 1929	June 1933	Westland Wapiti	Mks.IIa, VI
February 1933	August 1937	Hawker Hart	
August 1937	November 1938	Hawker Demon	
November 1938	March 1939	Gloster Gauntlet	Mk.II
January 1939	March 1940	Bristol Blenheim	Mk.If
March 1940	March 1941	Hawker Hurricane	Mk.I
March 1941	January 1942	Hawker Hurricane	Mk.IIb
August 1941	March 1942	Bell Airacobra	Mk.I
March 1942	April 1942	Supermarine Spitfire	Mk.Vb
May 1942	January 1944	Supermarine Spitfire	Mk.Vc
June 1943	August 1943	Supermarine Spitfire	Mk.IX
July 1943	June 1944	Supermarine Spitfire	Mk.VIII
June 1944	May 1945	Supermarine Spitfire	Mk.IXb
December 1946	December 1949	Supermarine Spitfire	LF.16e
November 1949	September 1952	de Havilland Vampire	F.3
August 1952	March 1957	Gloster Meteor	F.8

== Squadron bases ==
Bases and airfields used by no. 601 Squadron, data from
From	To	Base
14 October 1925	18 January 1927	RAF Northolt, Middlesex
18 January 1927	2 September 1939	RAF Hendon, Middlesex
2 September 1939	30 December 1939	RAF Biggin Hill, Kent
30 December 1939	1 June 1940	RAF Tangmere, Sussex (Dets. at Merville and Saint-Valery-en-Caux, France)
1 June 1940	17 June 1940	RAF Middle Wallop, Hampshire
17 June 1940	19 August 1940	RAF Tangmere, Sussex
19 August 1940	2 September 1940	RAF Debden, Essex
2 September 1940	7 September 1940	RAF Tangmere, Sussex
7 September 1940	17 December 1940	RAF Exeter, Devon
17 December 1940	1 May 1941	RAF Northolt, Middlesex
1 May 1941	30 June 1941	RAF Manston, Kent
30 June 1941	16 August 1941	RAF Matlaske, Norfolk
16 August 1941	2 January 1942	RAF Duxford, Cambridgeshire
2 January 1942	25 March 1942	RAF Acaster Malbis, York
25 March 1942	10 April 1942	RAF Digby, Lincolnshire
10 April 1942	20 April 1942	en route to Egypt
20 April 1942	23 June 1942	RAF Luqa, Malta (aircrew)
23 June 1942	25 June 1942	RAF Maryut, Egypt (ground- and aircrew reunited)
25 June 1942	29 June 1942	LG.13/Sidi Haneish South, Egypt
29 June 1942	24 July 1942	LG.154, Egypt
24 July 1942	29 July 1942	LG.173, Egypt
29 July 1942	5 August 1942	LG.85, Egypt
5 August 1942	11 August 1942	LG.219 Kilo 8/Matariyah/Payne Field, Egypt
11 August 1942	22 August 1942	RAF Helwan, Egypt
22 August 1942	26 September 1942	LG.154, Egypt
26 September 1942	7 November 1942	LG.92, Egypt
7 November 1942	9 November 1942	LG.21/Qotafiyah III, Egypt
9 November 1942	12 November 1942	LG.13/Sidi Haneish South, Egypt
12 November 1942	14 November 1942	LG.155, Egypt
14 November 1942	25 November 1942	LG.143/RAF Gambut West, Libya
25 November 1942	4 December 1942	Msus Airfield, Libya
4 December 1942	8 December 1942	El Hassiet, Libya
8 December 1942	21 December 1942	El Nogra, Libya
21 December 1942	31 December 1942	El Merduma, Libya
31 December 1942	9 January 1943	Alem El Chel, Libya
9 January 1943	20 January 1943	Hamraiet Airfield, Libya
20 January 1943	17 February 1943	Darragh North, Libya
17 February 1943	26 February 1943	RAF Castel Benito, Libya
26 February 1943	1 March 1943	Hazbub Main, Tunisia
1 March 1943	9 March 1943	Ben Gardane South, Tunisia
9 March 1943	11 March 1943	Hazbub North, Tunisia
11 March 1943	4 April 1943	Bu Grara, Tunisia (Det. at El Hamma, Tunisia)
4 April 1943	12 April 1943	Gabes Main, Tunisia
12 April 1943	16 April 1943	La Fauconnerie, Tunisia
16 April 1943	7 May 1943	Goubrine North, Tunisia
7 May 1943	21 May 1943	Hergla North, Tunisia
21 May 1943	15 June 1943	Ben Gardane North, Tunisia
15 June 1943	13 July 1943	RAF Luqa, Malta
13 July 1943	17 July 1943	Pachino, Sicily, Italy
17 July 1943	25 July 1943	Cassibile, Sicily, Italy
25 July 1943	5 October 1943	Lentini West
5 October 1943	18 October 1943	Tortorella
18 October 1943	26 November 1943	Triolo
26 November 1943	18 January 1944	Canne
18 January 1944	23 April 1944	Marcianise, Italy (Det. at Madna)
23 April 1944	12 June 1944	Venafro, Italy
12 June 1944	17 June 1944	Littorio, Italy
17 June 1944	3 July 1944	Fabrica, Italy
3 July 1944	24 August 1944	Perugia, Italy
24 August 1944	4 September 1944	Loreto, Italy
4 September 1944	4 December 1944	Fano, Italy
4 December 1944	3 May 1945	Bellaria, Italy
3 May 1945	14 August 1945	Treviso, Italy
10 May 1946	28 March 1949	RAF Hendon, Middlesex
28 March 1949	10 March 1957	RAF North Weald, Essex

== Notable pilots ==
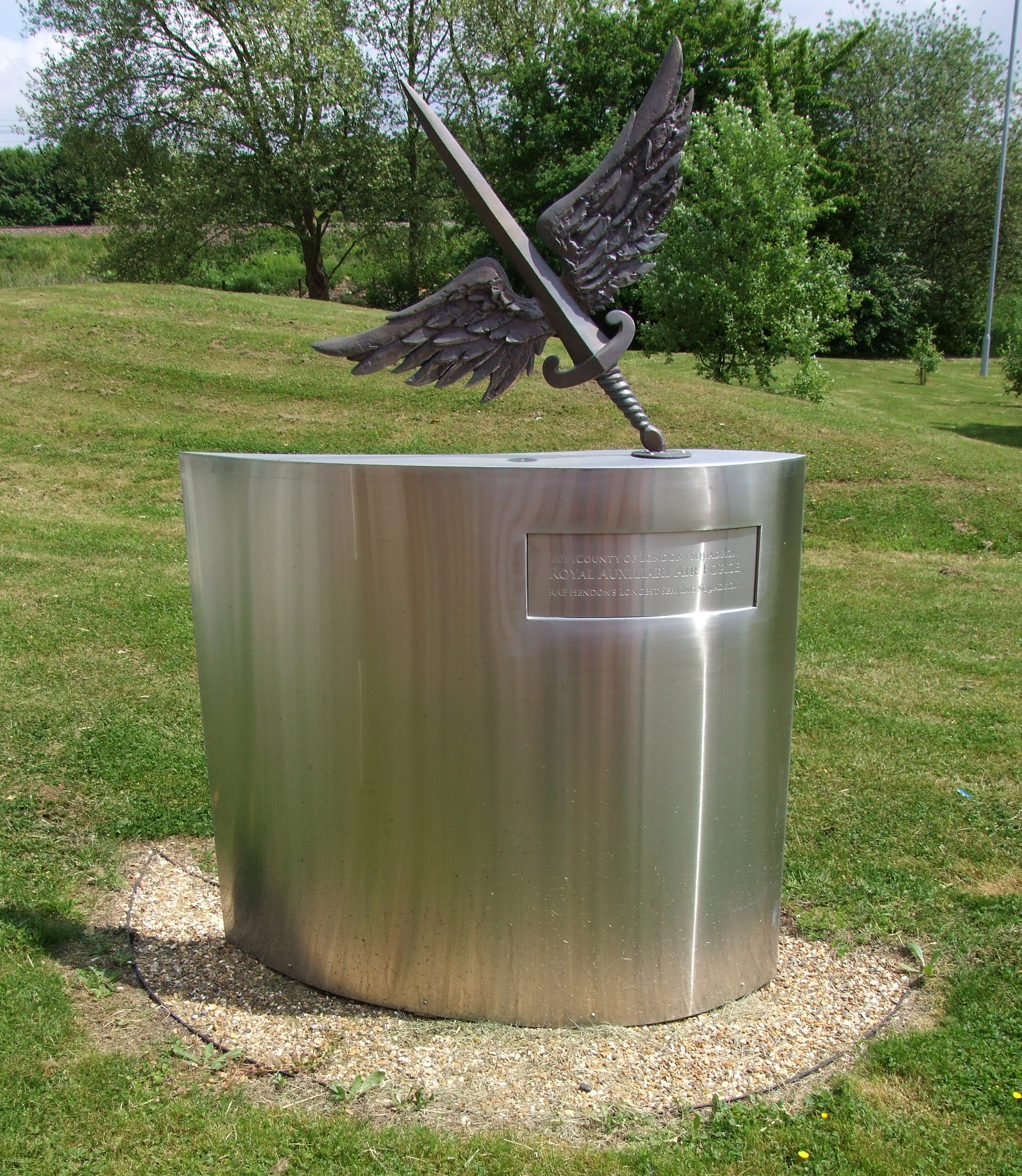
Memorial to 601 Squadron at RAF Museum Hendon

- Sqn Ldr Roger Bushell – took part in the Great Escape
- Sqn Ldr Gordon "Mouse" Cleaver DFC – Battle of Britain pilot whose accident aided the development of artificial optical lenses.
- Flt Lt Carl Davis DFC – American who flew with 601 Sqn during the Battle of Britain
- Plt Off "Billy" Fiske – American who flew with 601 Sqn during the Battle of Britain
- Gp Cpt Sir Archibald Philip Hope, 17th Baronet OBE DFC
- Plt Off B P Legge DFC
- Plt Off H C Mayers DSO DFC and Bar – Australian who flew with 601 Sqn during the Battle of Britain
- Gp Cpt J A O'Neill
- Flight Lieutenant Edward Whitehead Reid
- Flight Lieutenant Thomas Grier – Battle of Britain flying ace
- Flight Lieutenant William Clyde – Battle of Britain flying ace
- Fg Off W H Rhodes-Moorhouse DFC
- Sqn Ldr "Jack" Riddle & Sqn Ldr Hugh Riddle – brothers and last surviving aircrew who flew with 601 Sqn during the Battle of Britain (both died 2009)
- Sqn Ldr Stanisław Skalski DSO, DFC and Two Bars,- Polish ace, the second Pole to command an RAF Squadron, and later Polish Air Force general
- Norman Taylor DFC, DFM - Battle of Britain fighter pilot, and flying ace
- Air Cdre Whitney Straight CBE MC DFC
- Plt Off D R W Stubbs OBE DSO DFC
- Flight Lieutenant Denis Barnham (1920 - 1981). Painter, teacher and author of 'One man's window' his autobiographical account of the Siege of Malta otherwise titled as 'Malta Spitfire Pilot - Ten weeks of terror April - June 1942.

For more pilots who flew with the Squadron during the Battle of Britain, see List of RAF aircrew in the Battle of Britain.

== Commanding officers ==
Officers commanding No. 601 Squadron RAF, data from
From	To	Name
October 1925		Sqn Ldr Lord Edward Arthur Grosvenor
	1931	Sqn Ldr Sir Philip Sassoon, MP
1931	1934	Sqn Ldr Nigel Norman
July 1934	March 1936	Sqn Ldr R Shaw, DFC
March 1936	December 1939	Sqn Ldr B S Thynne
December 1939	June 1940	Sqn Ldr Loel Guinness
June 1940	July 1940	Sqn Ldr The Hon. Max Aitken, DFC
July 1940	August 1940	Sqn Ldr W F C Hobson
August 1940	August 1940	Sqn Ldr E F Ward
August 1940	December 1940	Sqn Ldr Sir Archibald Hope, OBE, DFC
December 1940	April 1941	Sqn Ldr J A O'Neill, DFC
April 1941	December 1941	Sqn Ldr E J Gracie, DFC
December 1941	March 1942	Sqn Ldr E J Jones
March 1942	April 1942	Sqn Ldr J D Bisdee, DFC
April 1942	July 1942	Sqn Ldr R G A Barclay, DFC
July 1942	August 1942	Sqn Ldr J D Bisdee, DFC
August 1942	March 1943	Sqn Ldr A V Clowes, DFC, DFM
March 1943	March 1943	Sqn Ldr G H F Plinston, DFC
March 1943	June 1943	Sqn Ldr J S Taylor, DFC
June 1943	September 1943	Sqn Ldr Stanisław Skalski, VM, KW, DSO, DFC and two Bars
September 1943	March 1944	Maj M S Osler, DFC
March 1944	July 1944	Sqn Ldr J H Nicholls, DFC
July 1944	January 1945	Sqn Ldr Robert Wilkinson Turkington, DFC
January 1945	May 1945	Sqn Ldr C T Stimpson
June 1946	June 1948	Sqn Ldr The Hon. Max Aitken, DSO, DFC
June 1948	1950	Sqn Ldr Hugh Dundas, DSO & Bar, DFC
1950	1952	Sqn Ldr P H M Richey, DFC & Bar
1952	January 1957	Sqn Ldr C C MacCarthy-Jones
January 1957	March 1957	Sqn Ldr Peter Edelston, DFC, AFC
April 2017	January 2018	Wg Cdr John Chappell, MBE, AE, VR
January 2018	To Date	AVM Malcolm Brecht CB, CBE

Note: Sir Philip Sassoon was Member of Parliament during his Squadron Leadership of 601 Squadron.

== See also ==
- Engineer and Logistic Staff Corps
