= Malcolm Osler =

South African flying ace

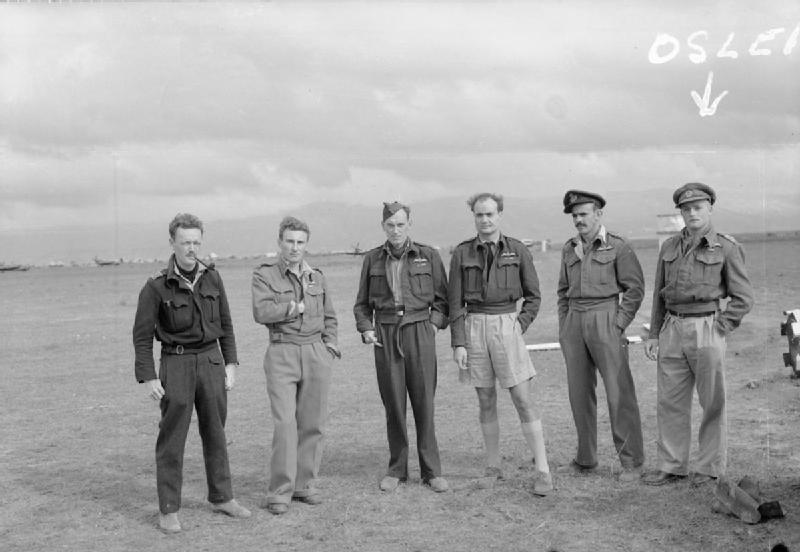
- Osler (far right)
- Born: 19 March 1919; Benoni, South Africa
- Died: 22 September 1971 (aged 52); Johannesburg, South Africa
- Military career
- Allegiance: South Africa
- Branch: South African Air Force
- Service years: 1939–1944
- Rank: Lieutenant Colonel
- Service number: IO2677V
- Commands: No. 601 Squadron RAF; 6 Squadron SAAF; 1 Squadron SAAF
- Conflicts: Second World War
- Awards: Distinguished Flying Cross & Bar

Lieutenant Colonel Malcolm Stephen Osler, DFC & Bar (19 March 1919 – 22 September 1971) was a South African flying ace of the Second World War, credited with 12 aerial victories.

== Military career ==
Osler joined the South African Permanent Force in 1938 after attending a TATS pupil pilot training scheme. He joined 1 Squadron SAAF in June 1941 and assumed command of the squadron 6 months later. He returned to South Africa and commanded 6 Squadron SAAF before attending a Military College Staff course. He served briefly as an instructor before joining 145 Squadron. On 29 April 1944 he was promoted to lieutenant colonel and awarded a Bar to his Distinguished Flying Cross. He then took command of No. 601 Squadron RAF before serving with 1 MORU and 5 SAAF Wing before being demobilised.

Osler died suddenly on 22 September 1971.
