= Hanover War Cemetery =

War cemetery in Germany

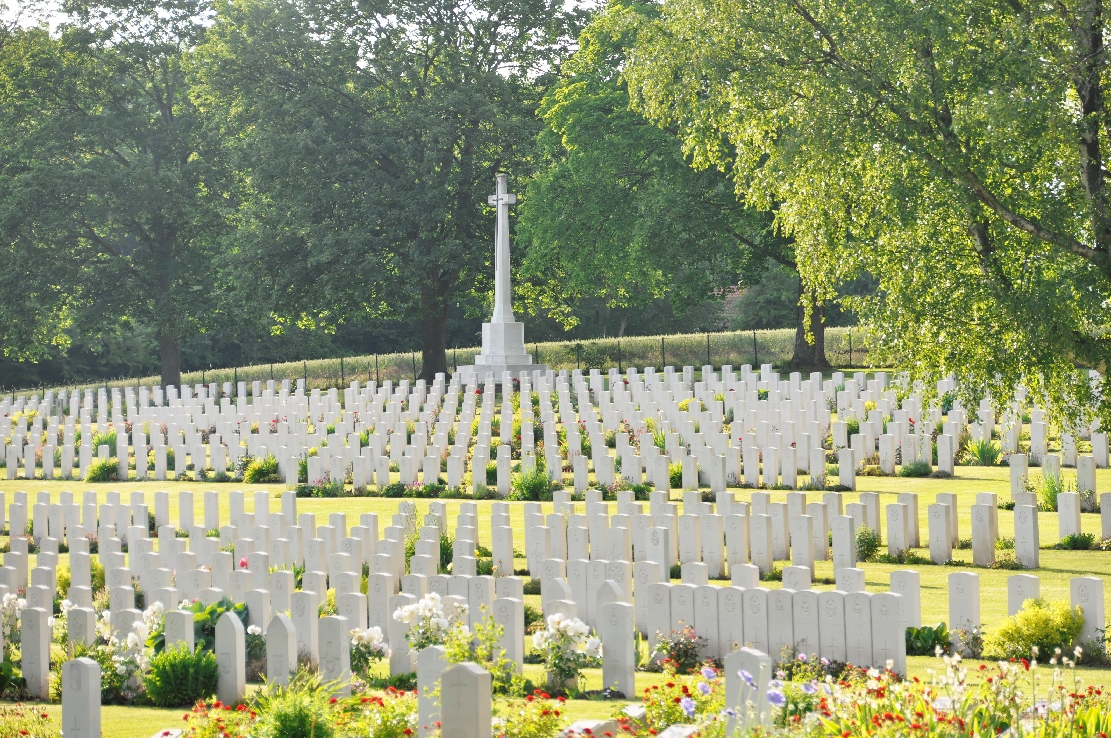
- Interactive map of Hanover War Cemetery

Details
- Established: Early 1950s
- Country: Germany
- Coordinates: 52.377581°N 9.652382°E
- No. of graves: 2,345

Hanover War Cemetery is a military cemetery owned by the Commonwealth War Graves Commission (CWGC). It is located in the city of Seelze, immediately adjacent to the city of Hanover, and contains predominantly Commonwealth burials of World War II. Immediately adjacent to its east is the Hanover Military Cemetery that has over 3,000 graves of members of the British Army of the Rhine and their families. Both are collectively called Englischer Friedhof (lit. 'English Cemetery').

== History and availability ==
The cemetery was built in the early 1950s as a cemetery for Commonwealth soldiers killed during World War II, merging other cemeteries with the same purpose into one. Upon completion of the cemetery, 2,451 soldiers, mainly from the Air Force, were buried, although currently there are only 2,345 graves.

== Cemetery design ==
The gravestones are made of sandstone, and contain the name, rank, date of death, and the coat of arms of its holder's unit. The graves are not arranged by rank nor by origin, symbolizing the cemetery's support for equality in death. Upon entering the cemetery, a lawn and shrubs gives the visitor a view into the cemetery grounds. The cemetery is designed by CWGC architect Philip Hepworth.
