= Norman Taylor (RAF officer) =

British flying ace of WWII

- Born: October 1919; Chellaston, Derby, England
- Died: 29 April 1948 (aged 28); Wunstorf, Germany
- Burial place: Munster Heath Military Cemetery, Germany
- Military career
- Allegiance: United Kingdom
- Branch: Royal Air Force
- Service years: 1939–1948
- Rank: Flight Lieutenant
- Units: No. 601 Squadron; Merchant Ship Fighter Unit; No. 222 Squadron
- Conflicts: Second World War: Battle of Britain; Circus offensive; Battle of the Atlantic
- Awards: Distinguished Flying Cross; Distinguished Flying Medal; Air Efficiency Award

Norman Taylor DFC, DFM, AE (October 1919 – 29 April 1948) was a British flying ace who served in the Royal Air Force (RAF) during the Second World War. He was credited with having shot down at least seven aircraft.

Born in Chellaston, Taylor was an apprentice at the Standard Motor Company and member of the Royal Air Force Volunteer Reserve at the time he was called up for service with the RAF in September 1939, following the outbreak of the Second World War. Once his training was completed, he was posted to No. 601 Squadron in August 1940. He flew through the later stages of the Battle of Britain and in the early phase of the Circus offensive the following year, during which he claimed several aerial victories. He was later awarded the Distinguished Flying Medal for his successes. He was posted to the Merchant Ship Fighter Unit in July 1941. He made several voyages aboard a CAM ship without seeing action until, on 1 November 1942, he intercepted and destroyed a Focke-Wulf Fw 200 Condor maritime patrol aircraft. Awarded the Distinguished Flying Cross for this exploit, he spent much of the remainder of the war as a test pilot for Rolls-Royce. Remaining in the RAF in the postwar period, he was killed in a flying accident in Germany on 29 April 1948.

== Early life ==
Norman Taylor was born in October 1919 in Chellaston, close to Derby, in England. He went to local schools before finishing his education at Coventry's Bablake School. He then went on to become an apprentice at the Standard Motor Company. He joined the Royal Air Force Volunteer Reserve (RAFVR) in January 1939 as an airman pilot. He trained at No. 11 Elementary and Reserve Flying Training School (E&RFTS) at Prestwick from late March to late May, before returning to his apprenticeship. He was able to fly in his spare time at No. 9 E&RFTS at Ansty.

== Second World War ==
On the outbreak of the Second World War, Taylor was called up for service in the Royal Air Force (RAF). In February 1940, he proceeded to No. 10 Service Flying Training School at Ternhill. During his time there he crashed a North American Harvard trainer aircraft when the throttle jammed open during his landing. Once he completed his training, he went to No. 6 Operational Training Unit in July for familiarisation with the Hawker Hurricane fighter.

=== Battle of Britain ===
Taylor was posted to No. 601 Squadron as a sergeant pilot on 7 August 1940. At the time, the Hurricane-equipped squadron was based at Tangmere and was heavily engaged in the Battle of Britain. Taylor's first claim was for a half share in a Junkers Ju 88 medium bomber that was damaged over Bishop's Waltham on 15 August. Three days later, on what became known as The Hardest Day, he shot down a Junkers Ju 87 dive bomber over Selsey Bill. He shared in the destruction of a Heinkel He 111 medium bomber on 30 August, the aircraft going down near North Weald. The following day, he destroyed a Messerschmitt Bf 109 fighter near Rayleigh. His Hurricane was then damaged and set alight by leaking fuel; Taylor bailed out without injury. His final victory of the Battle of Britain was on 6 September, when he damaged a Dornier Do 17 medium bomber near Hastings.

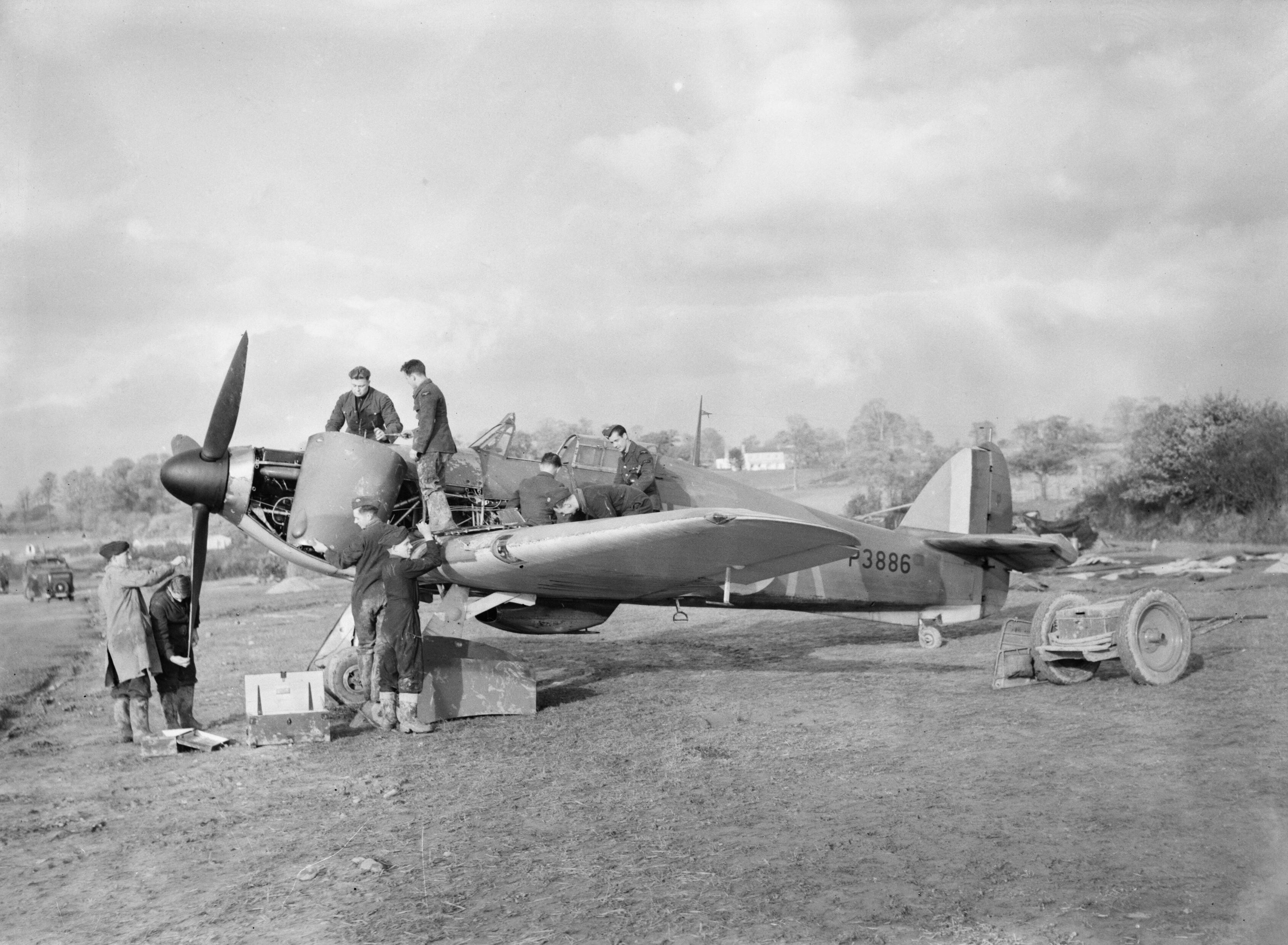
A Hawker Hurricane of No. 601 Squadron being serviced, November 1940

Later in September, No. 601 Squadron was shifted to Exeter for a rest following its hectic service in the aerial campaign over southeast England. After three months, it returned to the south of England, being stationed at Northolt.

=== Circus offensive ===
Taylor was rested for several weeks from December 1940 to February 1941, before returning to operations with No. 601 Squadron which, since early 1941, had been engaged in RAF Fighter Command's Circus offensive. It was now using the Hurricane Mk II, having begun to reequip with the type soon after arriving at Northolt. Taylor destroyed one Bf 109 and damaged a second over Calais on 25 May while on a sortie to France. He shot down a pair of Bf 109s off Dover on 13 June. Three days later he damaged a Bf 109 off Cap Gris-Nez and shortly afterwards was commissioned as a pilot officer on 19 June. He concluded his tour of operations at the end of June. He was subsequently awarded the Distinguished Flying Medal, in recognition of his successes prior to his promotion. The citation, published in The London Gazette read:

This airman pilot has taken part in numerous offensive operations and patrols. during which he has destroyed at least 4 and damaged other enemy aircraft. He has at all times shown great keenness and determination to engage the enemy.

— London Gazette, No. 35232, 29 July 1941

=== Later war service ===
Taylor was posted to the Merchant Ship Fighter Unit at Speke, which operated Sea Hurricane fighters from catapult aircraft merchant ships, known as CAM ships, sailing as part of a convoy. When long-range German aircraft were sighted, the Sea Hurricanes would be launched to attempt an interception; the pilot would then bail out afterwards and hope to be picked up by a vessel of the convoy. After a period of training, Taylor made his first operational voyage on a Cam ship, sailing aboard the Empire Rowan for Halifax in November. He was subsequently based at Gibraltar for a time.

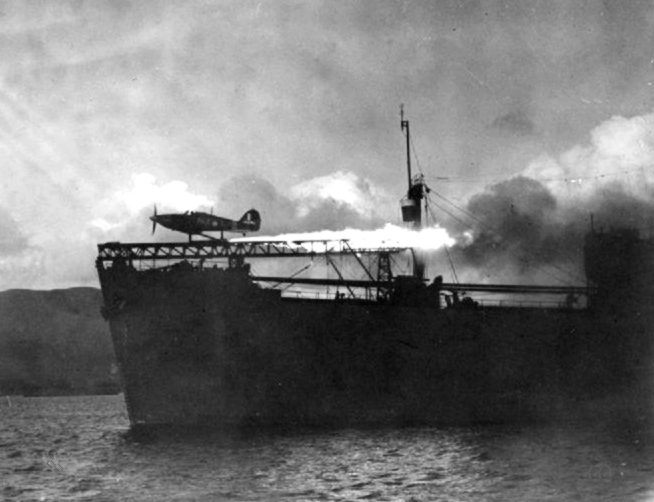
A Hawker Sea Hurricane being launched off the catapult of a CAM ship, 1941

Taylor, who had been promoted to flying officer on 19 June 1942, made several voyages without being scrambled. On 1 November, he was launched from the Empire Heath to attempt an interception of a Focke-Wulf Fw 200 Condor maritime patrol aircraft that had been sighted near the convoy, around 400 kilometres (250 mi) off the west coast of Spain. He successfully drove it off and shot the Fw 200 down into the Atlantic. Taylor, once he had bailed out, was collected by HMS Sweetbriar, a corvette of the Royal Navy. For his efforts, he was awarded the Distinguished Flying Cross. The published citation read:

In November, 1942, this officer was the pilot of an aircraft launched by catapult from a ship in convoy in the Atlantic Ocean, to engage a Focke Wulfe 200. Displaying great skill, Flying Officer Taylor intercepted and drove off the enemy aircraft before it could deliver an attack on any of the ships in the convoy. Despite adverse weather and in the face of strong opposing fire, he succeeded in destroying the enemy aircraft from close range. His courageous and skilful work earned the admiration of officers of the ships in the convoy who witnessed the operation.

— London Gazette, No. 35822, 15 December 1942

In April 1943 Taylor was assigned to the Rolls-Royce facility at Derby as a test pilot. Promoted to flight lieutenant on 19 June, he continued testing duties with Rolls-Royce until the end of the war. A recipient of the Air Efficiency Award for his service with the RAFVR, he was credited with the destruction of seven German aircraft, one of which being shared with other pilots. He was also credited with four aircraft, including one shared, as damaged.

== Postwar career ==
Opting to remain in the RAF in the postwar period, Taylor's period of service was extended by four years from December 1945. He served with No. 222 Squadron, which operated Gloster Meteor jet fighters from Fairwood Common. He was involved in the 1946 Victory fly past, flying a Meteor over Buckingham Palace.

Taylor later served in Germany, based at the RAF station at Gütersloh from January 1948. On 29 April 1948, he was flying a Harvard on instrument practice when he crashed the aircraft while attempting a landing at Wunstorf. Both Taylor and his passenger were killed. Survived by two children and his wife of five years, who later gave birth to a third child, he is buried at Munster Heath Military Cemetery in Germany.
