= 1944 Birthday Honours (Mentioned in Despatches) =

The 1944 King's Birthday Honours, celebrating the official birthday of King George VI, were announced on 2 June 1944 for the United Kingdom and British Empire, New Zealand, and South Africa.

Being near the end of World War II, it included a great many military personnel who were Mentioned in dispatches.

The recipients of honours are displayed here as they were styled before their mention.

== Mentioned in Despatches ==
Royal Air Force
Acting Air Marshal

- O. T. Boyd, CB, OBE, MC, AFC.

Air Vice-Marshals

- A. J. Capel, CB, DSO, DFC.
- C. R. Carr, CB, CBE, DFC, AFC.
- The Hon. R. A. Cochrane, CB, CBE, AFC.
- T. W. Elmhirst, CBE, AFC.
- R. D. Oxland, CB, CBE.
- A. E. Panter, MRCS, LRCP, KHS.
- E. A. B. Rice, CB, CBE, MC.
- J. M. Robb, CB, DSO, DFC, AFC.

Acting Air Vice-Marshal

- J. A. Gray, CBE, DFC, GM.

Air Commodores

- G. R. Beamish, CBE
- G. K. Biggs, MC.
- E. C. Hudleston, CBE, AFC.
- A. S. G. Lee, MC.
- R. L. Ragg, AFC.
- J. H. T. Simpson, DSO.
- S. C. Strafford, CBE, DFC.
- A. E. Sutton-Jones.
- T. C. Traill, OBE, DFC.
- A. H. Wann.
- J. Whitford, CBE.

Acting Air Commodores

- N. H. D'Arth, CBE.
- C. L. Falconer, OBE.
- E. M. F. Grundy, OBE.
- A. Hesketh, CBE, DFC.
- H. J. Kirkpatrick, DFC.
- A. W. B. Macdonald, AFC.
- S. L. G. Pope, DFC, AFC.
- P. Pyne, DFC.
- L. Taylor.
- G. W. Tuttle, OBE, DFC.
- R. Whyte, RAFVR.
- J. Whitley.

Group Captains

- C. D. Adams, OBE.
- J. M. Adams.
- N. S. Allinson.
- R. E. Bain.
- S. G. Beaumont, Auxiliary Air Force.
- J. R. Bell, DFC.
- S. G. Birch.
- D. W. F. Bonham-Carter.
- A. Bowden, Reserve of Air Force Officers.
- J. E. W. Bowles, DFC.
- V. S. Bowling.
- J. Bradbury, DFC.
- The Rev. D. G. Brook, RAFVR.
- E. Burton.
- C. W. Busk, MC, AFC.
- C. H. Cahill, DFC, AFC.
- The Rev. H. J. W. Carpenter, RAFVR.
- N. Carter, DFC.
- W. G. Cheshire.
- M. V. M. Clube, Auxiliary Air Force.
- R. W. P. Collings, AFC.
- A. R. Combe.
- W. R. Cox.
- A. C. Evans-Evans.
- F. G. H. Ewens.
- V. S. Ewing.
- R. C. Field.
- E. S. Finch.
- H. J. Gemmel.
- G. E. Gordon-Duff.
- R. K. Hamblin.
- G. N. Hancock.
- G. W. Hayes.
- E. A. Hodgson.
- C. V. Howes, DFC.
- J. W. Hunt.
- P. W. Johnson, DFC, AFC.
- J. W. T. Jones.
- J. M. Kilpatrick, MB, BCh, DPH.
- G. M. Knocker.
- R. B. Lees, CBE, DFC.
- J. B. Lynch.
- R. C. Mead, DFC, AFC.
- H. W. Mermagen, OBE, AFC.
- R. L. Mills.
- A. T. Monks.
- W. E. Oulton, DSO, DFC.
- J. T. Paine.
- I. R. Parker, Auxiliary Air Force.
- S. P. A. Patmore.
- M. G. Philpott.
- The Rev. N. F. Porter.
- F. C. Read.
- A. P. Revington, OBE.
- B. V. Reynolds, CBE.
- C. S. Riccard.
- C. Ryley, DFC.
- R. G. Seymour.
- M. S. Shapcott.
- W. C. Sheen, DSO.
- D. M. Somerville.
- H. F. G. Southey.
- C. H. A. Stevens.
- R. A. T. Stowell, DFC.
- W. V. Strugnell, MC.
- R. T. Taaffe, OBE.
- C. McC. Vincent, DFC, AFC.
- W. J. G. Walker, MRCS, LRCP.
- C. Walter, OBE.
- H. M. S. Wright.
- J. F. Young, MBE, MM.

Acting Group Captains

- K. S. Batchelor, DFC, Reserve of Air Force Officers.
- P. R. Beare, DSO, DFC.
- C. H. Brandon.
- R. K. Brougham.
- C. Broughton.
- E. S. Butler, OBE.
- A. M. Carey, CBE, Reserve of Air Force Officers.
- B. A. Chacksfield.
- D. de B. Clark, Auxiliary Air Force.
- W. N. Gumming, DFC.
- J. F. H. du Boulay.
- T. H. England, DSC, AFC.
- D. O. Finlay, DFC.
- W. S. Gardner, DFC, AFC.
- G. J. Grindell, DFC, AFC.
- T. L. E. B. Guinness, OBE, Auxiliary Air Force Reserve of Officers.
- J. F. Hobler.
- Sir A. P. Hope (90124), DFC, Auxiliary Air Force.
- E. C. Kidd, OBE, AFC, AFM.
- P. C. F. Lawton, DFC, Auxiliary Air Force Reserve of Officers.
- R. H. A. Leigh.
- J. C. Millar.
- O. A. Morris, DSO, DFC, Reserve of Air Force Officers.
- G. C. Pinkerton, OBE, DFC, Auxiliary Air Force.
- F. C. Richardson.
- D. G. H. Spencer, MBE.
- D. L. Thomson, DFC.
- W. H. M. Walker, Reserve of Air Force Officers.
- E. A. Warfield, DFC.
- H. McC. White, Reserve of Air Force Officers.
- S. C. Widdows, DFC.
- J. Worrall.
- R. H. Young, DSO, AFC.

Wing Commanders

- E. G. Ambridge (31011).
- P. E. Axon, MBE, (77800), RAFVR.
- R. A. C. Barclay (33017).
- J. N. Baxter (28177).
- R. G. Bowditch (05209).
- F. E. Burton, DFC, (37623), Reserve of Air Force Officers.
- J. S. Carslaw (23146).
- R. St. H. Clarke (03185).
- R. L. Edward (05104).
- J. V. Edwards (75205), RAFVR.
- R. W. B. Ellis (82914), RAFVR.
- R. A. Foggin (72832), RAFVR.
- R. G. Frith (90420), Auxiliary Air Force.
- G. D. Garvin (34237).
- F. P. Gee (31149).
- R. D. George, DSO, OBE, (75777), RAFVR.
- A. Gollan (21215).
- R. W. Gray (72234), RAFVR.
- A. Hanglin (35153).
- G. H. Harrison (35093).
- R. A. C. Holme (87632), RAFVR.
- T. F. Hosking (73641), RAFVR.
- W. L. Houlbrook (29242).
- C. E. Hunter (21192).
- N. H. Husbands, OBE, (29169).
- J. D. S. Huxley (36082).
- J. H. Irvin (37405).
- R. K. Jeffries (33262).
- F. W. Judge (21193).
- W. I. G. Kerby (36052).
- C. W. Kidd (90048), Auxiliary Air Force.
- G. V. Lane, DFC, AFC, (37602), Reserve of Air Force Officers.
- R. T. Langton, DFM, (45973).
- J. Lindsay (35104).
- R. E. W. Little (72308), RAFVR.
- C. H. E. Lyster, MBE, (31024).
- F. R. McAllister (37195).
- V. H. A. McBratney, AFC, (34085).
- R. H. McConnell, DFC, (33268).
- D. S. MacDonald, DFC, (37451).
- G. B. Macgibbon, MB, ChB, (23312).
- G. M. Mackie (35118).
- L. Mathias (33270).
- A. R. Morton (31014).
- E. J. Moule (08005), RAFVR.
- H. A. Murton (11193).
- R. G. Musson (34129) (deceased).
- A. J. Nicholas (35033).
- M. G. F. Pedley, DFC, (37328).
- T. C. Reep (21188).
- D. W. Reid, DFC, (32062).
- D. S. Robertson (40141).
- The Rev. D. C. E. Rogers (38067).
- E. N. Rooms, AFM, (36064).
- N. S. Roupell, Reserve of Air Force Officers.
- J. B. Russell, DSO (37125).
- B. Samson (34249).
- T. P. K. Scade, DFC, (76161), RAFVR.
- F. H. Searl (22229), Reserve of Air Force Officers.
- C. E. Sims (36062).
- G. A. L. Sinclair-Hill (72722), RAFVR.
- F. M. Smith (37613), Reserve of Air Force Officers.
- L. Spencer (35137).
- C. H. Stilwell (05092).
- K. C. M. Stock (90960), Auxiliary Air Force.
- V. C. F. Streatfield (27151), RAFVR.
- G. H. Stuart, MB, BS, MRCS, LRCP, (23170).
- J. H. Styles (35071).
- V. H. Tomkins (23122).
- E. M. Trounson (75672), RAFVR.
- B. A. Vautier (35113).
- J. C. Vickery (79017), RAFVR.
- N. W. Wakelin (32211).
- H. Walker (19040), Reserve of Air Force Officers.
- T. D. Weldon, MC.
- D. E. B. Wheeler (33103).
- D. W. Williams (33128).
- V. F. Williams (77331), RAFVR.
- H. R. Withers (21163).
- E. N. D. Worsley (21033).
- H. Wright, MBE, (35250).
- A. W. Younghusband (21164).

Acting Wing Commanders

- G. W. Adams (73057), RAFVR.
- N. Alexandra (28075).
- H. Allsopp (31486).
- P. W. Arbon, DFC, (41893), Reserve of Air Force Officers.
- G. P. Arden, MB, BS, FRCS, LRCP, (72039), RAFVR.
- A. T. Atkins (43319).
- W. P. Bain (39480), Reserve of Air Force Officers.
- R. Baker, DFC, (81930), RAFVR.
- R. A. Barnett (22157).
- H. T. Barton-Chapple (76081), RAFVR.
- L. R. Batten (82318), RAFVR.
- C. E. Beer (44345).
- J. D. Bisdee, DFC, (76575), RAFVR.
- A. Blande (90668), Auxiliary Air Force.
- S. P. A. Bousfield (72791), RAFVR.
- R. B. Brown (21051).
- W. F. Bryanton (80057), RAFVR.
- F. J. B. Budgett (85095), RAFVR.
- J. H. G. Bugden (21255).
- L. G. Burnand (37847), Reserve of Air Force Officers.
- W. T. Burnett, DFC, (40076), Reserve of Air Force Officers.
- H. B. B. Burns (31120).
- N. Bury (73115), RAFVR.
- D. O. Butler (37790).
- R. E. C. Cadman (90387), Auxiliary Air Force.
- D. W. S. Clark, DFC, (36213).
- W. T. Cleasby, OBE, (10221).
- C. M. Clementi (72465), RAFVR.
- W. M. Collins, DFC, (43848).
- A. R. Cooper (80678), RAFVR.
- W. Corden (35401).
- R. E. Craven, DFC, (39859).
- R. P. Crawshaw (60900), RAFVR.
- C. H. Cronkshaw, MBE, (43583).
- A. E. Crouchley (76376), RAFVR.
- D. H. Dabbs (09098), RAFVR.
- G. E. Daniel (84130), RAFVR.
- G. Dod (35331).
- J. C. Downie (35306).
- A. E. Dunlop, OBE, (44156).
- R. G. Dutton, DFC, (39072), Reserve of Air Force Officers.
- E. W. W. Ellis (39935).
- G. H. Everitt, DSO, DFC, (81032), RAFVR.
- J. W. Faulkner, MBE, (35265).
- B. W. Finn (46386).
- I. Forward (43442).
- J. Freeman (89012), RAFVR.
- J. F. Freeston (90697), Auxiliary Air Force.
- C. R. E. Freezer, MRCS, LRCP, MB, BS, (72557), RAFVR.
- M. W. Gallagher (103175), RAFVR.
- C. Gardner (09255).
- L. E. Giles, DFC, (42213), Reserve of Air Force Officers.
- J. R. Gillespie (70247), Reserve of Air Force Officers.
- W. J. Grace, OBE, (80664), RAFVR.
- E. J. Gracie, DFC, (29090), Reserve of Air Force Officers.
- Sir R. B. Graham (79643), RAFVR.
- G. B. Grayling, MRCS, LRCP, (72177), RAFVR.
- C. R. Griffiths (90228), Auxiliary Air Force Reserve of Officers.
- T. J. Gunn, DFC, AFC, (41401), Reserve of Air Force Officers.
- J. Hamilton (31222), Reserve of Air Force Officers.
- R. N. Hawes (86788), RAFVR.
- R. M. Hayes (76090), RAFVR.
- F. H. J. Heading (31109).
- B. Heath, DFC, (90818).
- H. J. Hickey (44632).
- J. H. Hodge (90179), Auxiliary Air Force Reserve of Officers.
- P. Honey, MBE, (35231).
- J. E. Horton, MBE, (35268).
- D. M. Jack (90170), Auxiliary Air Force.
- W. E. F. Jennings (76895), RAFVR.
- R. B. Johnson (66118), RAFVR.
- G. H. Jones (73970), RAFVR.
- J. S. Laird (37654), Reserve of Air Force Officers.
- H. R. Lawson, DFC, AFC, (43121).
- F. E. Lord (82410), RAFVR.
- W. Louw, DFC, (41190), Reserve of Air Force Officers.
- A. McDowall, DFM, (89299), RAFVR.
- J. C. MacGown (72766), RAFVR.
- T. C. McIlroy (74176), RAFVR.
- B. R. Macnamara (25123).
- J. C. McWatters, DFC, (86655), RAFVR.
- R. H. Mason (41127), Reserve of Air Force Officers.
- D. V. G. Mawhood (40314), Reserve of Air Force Officers.
- A. E. Miller (43585).
- G. A. Miller (88310), RAFVR.
- G. Milner (72892), RAFVR.
- J. G. Minifie (39889), Reserve of Air Force Officers.
- C. S. Morice, MC, (03003).
- J. E. M. Mould (31284).
- C. N. A. Mumby (18058), RAFVR.
- E. A. Natzio (86169), RAFVR.
- J. H. Neal, MRCS, LRCP, (23295).
- A. C. W. Norman (90121), Auxiliary Air Force Reserve of Officers.
- J. H. Over (43672).
- J. A. Payne (77990), RAFVR.
- F. J. Powell, MC, (74207), RAFVR.
- R. C. Pretty (08056), RAFVR.
- H. H. Rase (77739), RAFVR.
- J. W. Rayner (70565), RAFVR.
- J. A. C. Robinson (35196).
- R. H. Scott (90221), Auxiliary Air Force.
- F. J. Seabrook (43588).
- R. S. Searle (82883), RAFVR.
- L. W. Skey, DFC, (39423), Reserve of Air Force Officers.
- D. B. Smith (70630), RAFVR.
- M. J. Smith (87633), RAFVR.
- N. L. Smith (37916), Reserve of Air Force Officers.
- A. G. C. Somerhough (24075).
- G. M. Somers (44321).
- R. C. T. Speir (80852), RAFVR.
- J. A. G. Stuart (73415), RAFVR.
- R. M. Thomas (21035).
- P. H. Thomson (72244), RAFVR.
- C. Tomkins (43497).
- E. F. Tonge (40034), Reserve of Air Force Officers.
- S. E. Townson (46179).
- H. L. Tudor (76532), RAFVR.
- R. C. Udall (79254), RAFVR.
- T. A. Vigors, DFC, (33554)
- H. Walters, MBE, (35379)
- G. H. Wass (76383), RAFVR.
- F. M. N. Watts (44491).
- R. Watts-Jones (88093), RAFVR.
- W. H. Westgate, MBE, (44275).
- R. G. J. White (31168).
- E. F. Wilde (43671).
- R. W. Williams (35390).
- A. G. Wincott (37841), Reserve of Air Force Officers.
- H. S. Wolff (72292), RAFVR.
- A. S. Woodgate (31185).
- M. Wyatt, DFC, (37994), Reserve of Air Force Officers.

Squadron Leaders

- A. D. M. Adams, BM, BCh, MRCS, LRCP, (555).
- The Rev. W. J. Adams (38092), Reserve of Air Force Officers.
- G. C. Alington (40974), Reserve of Air Force Officers.
- A. J. Allsop (45131)
- W. H. Ashbee (74410).
- T. E. M. Ashton (65464), RAFVR.
- The Rev. A. Attard (67565), RAFVR.
- A. W. Attrill (43801).
- S. P. Austin (21311), Reserve of Air Force Officers.
- G. G. Avis, DFC, (39774), Reserve of Air Force Officers.
- W. S. Baddeley, MBE, (78377), RAFVR.
- S. R. Baden (72155), RAFVR.
- The Rev L. S. R. Badham (81317), RAFVR.
- A. Banister (85070), RAFVR.
- J. F. R. Barker (69532), RAFVR.
- N. D. Barratt (113081), RAFVR.
- L. E. Barry (72607), RAFVR.
- R. F. Bateman (66066), RAFVR.
- C. R. Beaston (73848), Reserve of Air Force Officers.
- B. J. E. Belcher, DFC, (72609), RAFVR.
- J. P. Bennett (72252), RAFVR.
- G. L. W. Boswell (41104), Reserve of Air Force Officers.
- M. N. Bradshaw-Jones (78200), RAFVR.
- A. W. Bridger (31118).
- D. L. Brocklesby, AFC, (73567), RAFVR.
- The Rev. I. Brodie (88640), RAFVR (deceased).
- B. J. Bugden (66115), RAFVR.
- R. H. Burdon-Cooper (91042), Auxiliary Air Force.
- R. J. Bushell (90120), Auxiliary Air Force (deceased).
- J. P. Cafferkey (03172), RAFVR.
- P. C. Campbell (90822), Auxiliary Air Force.
- S. Campling (43606).
- J. W. Charnley.
- M. R. Chassels (77090), RAFVR.
- G. P. Collier (74457), RAFVR.
- G. L. Couch (75118), RAFVR.
- S. E. Craig, MBE, (45154).
- A. J. Croft-Cohen (77445), RAFVR.
- I. K. P. Cross, DFC, (39305), Reserve of Air Force Officers (deceased).
- P. H. Curtis (31213).
- J. S. Darrant (43500).
- E. A. Dearman (81808), RAFVR.
- L. E. De Rouet (80680), RAFVR.
- M. V. de Satge (27240), Reserve of Air Force Officers.
- P. C. W. Disney (70183).
- W. Dixon (86929), RAFVR.
- The Rev. A. D. Dobson (106476), RAFVR.
- W. E. B. Bowling (60351), RAFVR.
- H. W. Durtnell (75423), RAFVR.
- H. C. Edenborough (74489), RAFVR.
- N. A. Edwards (36159), Reserve of Air Force Officers.
- C. E. Ellis (83542), RAFVR.
- H. S. Elton, MC, (90667), Auxiliary Air Force.
- J. L. T. Evans (88940), RAFVR.
- A. G. Evenden (35226).
- D. C. Farquharson (88166), RAFVR.
- P. J. Ferguson (90167), Auxiliary Air Force.
- A. Fisher (43210).
- C. Freakes (43559).
- The Rev. J. L. Gammon (89290), RAFVR.
- A. R. Glading (35308).
- A. T. Goodrich (136148), RAFVR.
- G. G. G. Graves (73753), RAFVR.
- R. C. C. Green (80684), RAFVR.
- T. L. Grey (10099), RAFVR.
- G. P. Grieve (87770), RAFVR.
- R. Grimshaw (90592), Auxiliary Air Force.
- D. F. Hackett (72338), RAFVR.
- O. R. W. Hammerbeck (39822).
- The Rev. T. Hankin (77527), RAFVR.
- R. A. Harding (44941).
- The Rev. J. C. Harkus (77268), RAFVR.
- G. J. Haynes (78119), RAFVR.
- R. W. Head (31223), Reserve of Air Force Officers.
- D. E. Henderson (31273), Reserve of Air Force Officers.
- E. G. F. Hill (31323), Reserve of Air Force Officers.
- J. T. C. Hillman (85728), RAFVR.
- R. W. Holloway (90806), Auxiliary Air Force.
- J. S. F. Hood (76171), RAFVR.
- J. F. Houchin (72697), RAFVR.
- J. V. M. Howe (87921), RAFVR.
- H. Hudson, MBE, (44008).
- The Rev. H. T. Hughes (106470), RAFVR.
- C. F. Hunt (35393).
- H. J. Hyde (46065).
- H. F. Jacob (45504).
- J. K. A. Jeakes, DFC, (04077).
- F. L. Jenkins (44354)
- The Rev. A. B. Jestice (106471), RAFVR.
- B. P. Jones (37739), Reserve of Air Force Officers.
- F. P. Joyce (40303), Reserve of Air Force Officers.
- J. T. Kemp (82023), RAFVR.
- A. H. E. King (74961), RAFVR.
- The Rev. W. D. Kivlehan (108817), RAFVR.
- A. B. Knowles (43429), RAFVR.
- V. J. Lambert (43558).
- S. H. Latham (33489).
- E. R. L. Lewis (79417), RAFVR.
- C. Y. McGlashan (38073), Reserve of Air Force Officers.
- M. L. Maley (72102), RAFVR.
- H. C. R. Marten (117099), RAFVR.
- V. E. Mearles (75713), RAFVR.
- H. N. Miller (70464), RAFVR.
- W. L. Mills (35359).
- L. D. G. Morrison (70477), RAFVR.
- L. H. Morse (76172), RAFVR.
- L. R. Mumby (31235).
- J. B. Murphy (70933), Reserve of Air Force Officers.
- G. W. Newman (80749), RAFVR.
- H. F. N. Nicholls (88076), RAFVR.
- J. L. O'Brien (45262).
- C. A. C. O'Connor, MB, BCh, (77603), RAFVR.
- H. G. A. Orbell (21281).
- F. G. G. Parsons (43222).
- J. A. Partridge (77450), RAFVR.
- The Rev. U. P. Perring (74807), RAFVR.
- E. G. Pinckney (82130), RAFVR.
- G. W. B. Plant (68253), RAFVR.
- D. G. Potter (44638).
- The Rev. G. Price (84873), RAFVR.
- G. W. Robertson (100111), RAFVR.
- R. H. Rodber (44146).
- P. G. M. Ridsdale (31346), Reserve of Air Force Officers.
- G. H. Seeley (43581).
- J. H. Simpson, DFC, (117583), RAFVR.
- F. H. Smith (62456), RAFVR.
- The Rev. H. A. Smith-Masters (88380), RAFVR.
- The Rev. G. E. Sparrowe (82496), RAFVR.
- J. N. Stacey, DFC, (41217), Reserve of Air Force Officers.
- D. Stevenson, MD, ChB, (77900), RAFVR.
- W. H. Stratton, DFC, (40152), Reserve of Air Force Officers.
- A. G. Stringer (76106), RAFVR.
- R. F. Stubbs (72497), RAFVR.
- A. S. Summers (35839).
- F. H. Taylor (80275), RAFVR.
- H. W. Taylor (44624).
- J. G. Tedd, RAFVR.
- H. Thrower (75865), RAFVR.
- T. P. F. Trudgian (21238).
- C. G. Vandyk (74998), RAFVR.
- J. Watson, MB, BCh, MRCS, LRCP, (78230), RAFVR.
- J. R. Watson (101135), RAFVR.
- V. H. Webb (21313).
- J. P. Wells (37702), Reserve of Air Force Officers.
- P. H. V. Wells (72098), RAFVR.
- G. P. Wildish (40275), Reserve of Air Force Officers.
- A. D. Wilson (76183), RAFVR.
- The Rev J. L. Wright (75078), RAFVR.

Acting Squadron Leaders

- W. A. Allen (114665), RAFVR.
- P. R. Allison (81748), RAFVR.
- H. Ames (82246), RAFVR.
- E. J. Andrews (44433).
- E. P. Appleton (62451), RAFVR.
- F. J. Ashton (82446), RAFVR.
- C. A. Ayling (120189), RAFVR.
- I. G. G. Ayscough (80718), RAFVR.
- B. N. Bacchus (123874), RAFVR.
- J. V. Baker (76162), RAFVR.
- J. N. Bamborough (44618).
- E. J. Bannister (87860), RAFVR.
- C. A. Barnes, DFC, (62268), RAFVR.
- J. E. M. Barnes, MRCS, LRCP, (72568), RAFVR.
- S. A. Barnett (74416), RAFVR.
- J. B. Barratt (80913), RAFVR.
- O. E. Bartlett, MBE, (31421), Reserve of Air Force Officers.
- W. N. Basson (78539), RAFVR.
- A. A. Baxter (46788).
- J. S. Belton, DFC, (61018), RAFVR.
- M. M. Berman (101767).
- C. E. Bicknell (44578).
- H. F. Blackmore (78571), RAFVR.
- J. P. Blackmore (45313).
- J. F. Blick (74431), RAFVR.
- A. G. Boggis (43890).
- R. J. Bond (85732), RAFVR.
- R. H. G. Boosey, DFC, (110552), RAFVR.
- H. S. Bouchier (67189), RAFVR.
- K. W. Boyer (68288), RAFVR.
- R. L. Bradford, MC, (89860), RAFVR.
- C. F. Bradley (65493), RAFVR.
- T. W. Branch (78508), RAFVR.
- E. G. Brant (73854), RAFVR.
- A. I. Bray (87098), RAFVR.
- S. G. Briden (43649).
- T. H. Bridgewater (60149), RAFVR.
- A. T. Brock (70085), RAFVR.
- R. H. C. Brousson (73102), RAFVR.
- R. H. Brown (73106), RAFVR.
- T. H. Bryant, MC, (79840), RAFVR.
- R. A. Buchanan (140579), RAFVR.
- C. W. Buckingham, MBE, (47928).
- N. A. Burges (83332), RAFVR.
- H. S. Burrows (45350).
- V. H. Buscall (86197), RAFVR.
- R. E. Butcher (75929), RAFVR.
- W. R. Butterfield, DFC, (67056), RAFVR.
- J. R. A. Careless, DFC, (43263).
- A. Carr (106785), RAFVR.
- A. M. Chassels (78385), RAFVR.
- J. D. Chown (79531), RAFVR.
- J. G. Clark (113408), RAFVR.
- P. R. Clapham (74451), RAFVR.
- A. S. Coldham (84569), RAFVR.
- J. Colover (85601), RAFVR.
- J. S. Comper (79107), RAFVR.
- P. Condon-Finucane (105993), RAFVR.
- A. Connell (86198), RAFVR.
- R. K. Cooke (61608), RAFVR.
- L. G. Coombs (47352).
- G. Cooper (48805).
- V. F. Cottrell (82387), RAFVR.
- S. Cox (117932), RAFVR.
- J. T. Crawshaw (82878), RAFVR.
- H. L. Creeth (128003), RAFVR.
- F. J. S. Culley (106973), RAFVR.
- L. S. Cundell (79361), RAFVR.
- R. M. Cunningham (103707), RAFVR.
- R. Cunningham-Jones, MRCS, LRCP, (82482), RAFVR.
- A. S. Cussens (67614), RAFVR (deceased).
- A. D'Agapeyeff (87808), RAFVR.
- D. Dakin (68859), RAFVR.
- D. J. D'Alton, DFC, (77206), RAFVR.
- G. A. Davidson (112928), RAFVR.
- C. W. A. Davies (43506).
- H. W. C. Davies (82888), RAFVR.
- K. Davies (41156), Reserve of Air Force Officers.
- P. W. Davies (43817).
- G. C. Day, DFC, (45974).
- R. S. Day (81922), RAFVR.
- C. A. Deacon, AFM, (46267).
- E. D. Deane, MM, (44443).
- G. E. Dimmer (74792), RAFVR.
- C. J. Dixon (81096), RAFVR.
- J. R. Donald (114253), RAFVR.
- G. H. Downing (72405), RAFVR.
- G. W. Duncan (89867), RAFVR.
- H. Eason (81297), RAFVR.
- E. Eastwood (67721), RAFVR.
- R. Efstathiou (79883), RAFVR.
- G. A. L. Elliot, DFC, (43830).
- L. D. Emblem (43011).
- D. G. Evans (79135), RAFVR.
- H. G. Evans (102227), RAFVR.
- H. R. Evans (43508).
- J. R. Fagan (89670), RAFVR.
- W. C. Fahie (75521), RAFVR.
- M. E. Faithful (82851), RAFVR.
- H. B. Fearnley (88086), RAFVR.
- F. H. Fearnside (48242).
- B. Fellows (23428).
- R. G. Fennell (76901), RAFVR.
- P. Fitzpatrick (76527), RAFVR.
- J. B. A. Fleming (43531).
- R. B. Fleming (45172), Reserve of Air Force Officers.
- G. C. Fletcher (119411), RAFVR.
- H. T. Flintoft (89455), RAFVR.
- A. Foden (73679), RAFVR.
- A. H. Foord, DFC, (60790), RAFVR.
- A. B. Ford (91086), Auxiliary Air Force.
- G. Ford (68141), RAFVR.
- A. D. Foster (64768), RAFVR.
- S. A. Fox (70224), Reserve of Air Force Officers.
- G. Frain, MBE,(90473), Auxiliary Air Force.
- R. W. Fraser (83808), RAFVR.
- L. Freeman (85142), RAFVR.
- F. J. Friend (45020).
- D. P. Furneaux, (77803), RAFVR.
- J. E. Garlick (48294).
- S. J. Gentle (107835), RAFVR.
- A. R. Gillespie (91078), Auxiliary Air Force.
- G. W. Gilpin, DFC, (89348), RAFVR.
- L. T. Gilson (81168), RAFVR.
- G. A. Glossop (44154).
- E. F. Goater (45172).
- K. W. Godfrey (77353), RAFVR.
- D. C. Goodrich (47331).
- R. Gore (78334), RAFVR.
- W. G. K. Gorrie (115739), RAFVR.
- L. Graves, DFC, (44464).
- W. R. Green (104383), RAFVR.
- E. J. Greenleaf (47663).
- T. D. Griffin (84408), RAFVR.
- V. G. Grylls, DFC, (79172), RAFVR.
- D. L. Haines (117181), RAFVR.
- H. Hall (68241), RAFVR.
- A. S. Hamlett (45875).
- A. G. G. Hanks (84793), RAFVR.
- R. J. Hardy, DFC, (63461), RAFVR.
- S. A. Hargrove (79464), RAFVR.
- W. G. W. Harper (104648), RAFVR.
- W. T. Harrington (47005).
- C. H. Hartley (77139), RAFVR.
- A. R. Harvey (79044), RAFVR.
- J. Harvey (46675).
- J. A. Hatton (84141), RAFVR.
- C. S. Hawley, MBE,(77685), RAFVR.
- J. C. F. Hayter, DFC, (36207).
- P. W. Helmore, DFC, (89350), RAFVR.
- H. Hemming, AFC, (122513), RAFVR.
- R. H. R. Hemsted (107950), RAFVR (deceased).
- E. H. Henton, MM, (72672), RAFVR.
- K. Herring (47089).
- G. M. J. Hickman (74382), RAFVR.
- H. C. Hill (117845), RAFVR.
- T. C. F. Hill (86697), RAFVR.
- J. L. Hillary (72676), RAFVR.
- D. E. Hilliard (46746).
- S. A. Hogg (89188), RAFVR.
- J. R. C. Honeybone (107599), RAFVR
- E. Hopcraft (86216), RAFVR.
- H. J. Houghton, DFC, (45301).
- L. F. Hubbard (46680).
- T. F. Humphreys (81299), RAFVR.
- S. J. Hunt (60213), RAFVR.
- J. McA. Hutcheon (64786), RAFVR.
- A. E. Jaquemet (87004), RAFVR.
- C. R. Jeffries (87144), RAFVR.
- D. L. Johnson, MRCS, LRCP, (88630), RAFVR.
- G. A. B. Johnston (90596), Auxiliary Air Force.
- C. M. Johnstone (86022), RAFVR.
- R. I. Jones (77246), RAFVR.
- W. F. Jordan (76529), RAFVR.
- E. S. Kennedy (108023), RAFVR.
- S. F. Kettell (45768).
- D. V. Kidman (77749), RAFVR.
- R. A. Kings (82953), RAFVR.
- C. H. Kippen (77534), RAFVR.
- T. G. Kirby-Green (39103), Reserve of Air Force Officers (deceased).
- J. W. Knight (48164).
- R. H. Knight, DFC, (49269), RAFVR.
- W. D. W. Knight (100088), RAFVR.
- V. D. Knox, DFC, (63842), RAFVR.
- R. A. Kraty (106053), RAFVR.
- R. W. Lass, MRCS, LRCP, (78834), RAFVR.
- C. A. Lea (140775), RAFVR.
- H. O. Leal (79930), RAFVR.
- W. Lee (73784), RAFVR.
- T. M. Leigh (65637), RAFVR.
- N. L. Letten (42350).
- E. M. Lewis, DFC, (103518).
- E. T. Lewis (89537), RAFVR.
- J. G. S. Linacre (112188), RAFVR.
- J. D. K. Lloyd (77736), RAFVR.
- T. W. Lloyd, DSO, (84133) (since deceased), RAFVR.
- A. G. Logan (47611).
- W. M. Lomax (75143), RAFVR.
- F. B. Lowe (79470), RAFVR.
- J. H. Lowes (43936).
- M. J. Lucey (112348), RAFVR.
- F. D. Lugard (73579), RAFVR.
- H. S. Lusk (72539), RAFVR.
- J. McA. McArthur (109157), RAFVR.
- S. McAughey (85787), RAFVR.
- C. A. McCaig (89277), RAFVR.
- C. W. T. MacGillivray (74175), RAFVR.
- A. J. McGregor (81919), RAFVR.
- R. McLean (100720), RAFVR.
- E. F. Macey (45497).
- E. Maidment (44164).
- J. D. Mallinson (42513).
- J. K. Mallinson (105924), RAFVR.
- E. W. J. Maloney (46158).
- D. P. Marshall (107824), RAFVR.
- H. L. Marshall (79274), RAFVR.
- K. W. Marten (78799), RAFVR.
- I. R. Mascall (72362), RAFVR.
- H. G. Matheson (83917), RAFVR.
- W. J. Mathews (73289), RAFVR.
- E. V. F. Matthews (101205), RAFVR.
- R. W. Mattocks (104805), RAFVR.
- J. A. Meads (70810), Reserve of Air Force Officers.
- F. Metcalfe (79956), RAFVR.
- L. W. Meynell (65644), RAFVR.
- D. H. Mills (87882), RAFVR.
- L. H. Mills (114387), RAFVR.
- T. W. H. Mills (100144), RAFVR.
- R. Moore (65014), RAFVR.
- A. W. I. Mosdell (45370).
- J. E. Munden (45817).
- D. Munro (68893), RAFVR.
- W. A. Naylor (46288).
- G. J. Newman (101037), RAFVR.
- J. V. Newson (83309), RAFVR.
- J. A. Nicholls (45396).
- F. K. Nicholson (101415), RAFVR.
- R. V. Nicholson (101186), RAFVR.
- J. S. Nicoll (85173), RAFVR.
- B. R. Noble (81043), RAFVR.
- G. D. N. Noel-Johnson (42320).
- L. C. Noon (46976).
- S. Nunn (44480).
- W. E. Ogle-Skan (41609), Reserve of Air Force Officers.
- G. L. O'Hanlon, MBE,(44090).
- J. H. Oughton (102586), RAFVR.
- F. J. Pacey (106387), RAFVR.
- T. H. Palmer (112857), RAFVR.
- R. F. Paterson (83494), RAFVR.
- S. E. Pattinson, DFC, (42429).
- W. R. Peake, MB, BS, MRCS, LRCP, (45263).
- G. E. R. Pearl (84303), RAFVR.
- G. A. Pearson (46106).
- J. M. Pearson (65593), RAFVR.
- A. J. Peart (47625), RAFVR.
- W. L. Peate (60360), RAFVR.
- L. W. Percival, MBE,(46413).
- D. G. Perry (45126).
- G. G. Petty, DSO, DFC, (44357).
- E. E. Philipp (78517), RAFVR.
- S. F. Pickup (74203), RAFVR.
- D. G. H. Pike (68183), RAFVR.
- W. J. R. Pincott (86267), RAFVR.
- T. H. Pollock (68716), RAFVR.
- G. A. Potter (44251).
- J. V. Powell (84423), RAFVR.
- W. McQ. Pratt (44736).
- F. L. Preston (62073), RAFVR.
- C. Price (83818), RAFVR.
- A. J. Putnam (115310), RAFVR.
- J. R. F. Randell, DFC, (04184).
- S. Rhodes (100797), RAFVR.
- A. G. Rickard (45029).
- R. Riley (85083), RAFVR.
- J. B. Robinson (87786), RAFVR.
- J. H. Robinson, DFC, (86429), RAFVR.
- T. B. Robinson (104937), RAFVR.
- F. A. Rood (46410).
- W. V. Roe (61384), RAFVR.
- A. A. Roissetter (46279).
- C. A. B. Rome (78755), RAFVR.
- S. N. Rose (81920), RAFVR.
- K. A. Russell (112317), RAFVR.
- R. W. Salmon (45170).
- F. M. R. F. Sander (88922), RAFVR.
- H. H. Sandiford (64401), RAFVR.
- D. O. Sands, DFC, (102110), RAFVR.
- A. E. Sansom (83815), RAFVR.
- C. B. Savory (84942), RAFVR.
- B. Schneider (87292), RAFVR.
- R. H. Schofield (120349), RAFVR.
- J. J. Secter (85773), RAFVR.
- H. Seymour (83454), RAFVR.
- H. J. C. Seymour (73787), RAFVR.
- E. A. A. Shackleton (83143), RAFVR.
- J. R. Sherborne (81835), RAFVR.
- C. A. Shewell (89416), RAFVR.
- N. P. Shields, MRCS, LRCP, (76450), RAFVR.
- C. D. Short (74381), RAFVR.
- E. H. Sillince (44885).
- R. L. Simpson (81095), RAFVR.
- J. S. Skelly (120172), RAFVR.
- A. W. Slater (73399), RAFVR.
- W. E. J. Smart (48268).
- B. A. S. Smeed (45639).
- J. M. Smiles (85613), RAFVR.
- B. V. Smith (47246).
- C. H. Smith (84233), RAFVR.
- F. K. Smith (48979).
- M. A. Smith, DFC, (88658), RAFVR.
- P. N. Smith, DFC, (88026), RAFVR.
- T. V. Smith (87493), RAFVR.
- W. M. Smith (74229), RAFVR.
- G. Smythe, DFM, (47752).
- E. C. Spencer (63161), RAFVR.
- R. J. Standing (43792).
- R. Steele (62435), RAFVR.
- R. A. Steele (100196), RAFVR.
- F. S. Stewart (43923).
- G. E. M. Stock (76274), RAFVR.
- N. Storer (43758).
- D. P. Story (61565), RAFVR.
- E. H. G. Stringer, DFC, (102607), RAFVR.
- F. H. Stubbs, DFM, (43480).
- R. W. Sutton (44149).
- S. L. Swain (75814), RAFVR.
- T. H. Sykes (60715), RAFVR.
- M. Tait (79010), RAFVR.
- A. R. Tettenborn, DFC, (108048), RAFVR.
- L. W. Thackwell (89980), RAFVR.
- D. S. Thaw (85334), RAFVR.
- F. A. Thompson (61079), RAFVR.
- H. W. L. Thompson (85266), RAFVR.
- R. C. A. Thompson (85154), RAFVR.
- Sir Ivo W. H. Thomson (105268), RAFVR.
- P. G. Todd, MRCP, MRCS, MB, BS, (79721), RAFVR.
- R. F. L. Tong, DFC, (63848), RAFVR.
- J. L. Trainer, LRCP&S, LRFPS, LDS, (75984), RAFVR.
- R. F. Trim (82664), RAFVR.
- H. R. Tucker (44437).
- G. F. Turner (77588), RAFVR.
- K. R. Upright (85907), RAFVR.
- J. Walmisley (80055), RAFVR.
- L. W. N. Walker (45864).
- A. F. Ward (45472).
- H. J. Walters (100612), RAFVR.
- A. F. Wearn (44161).
- A. C. G. Wenman (85270), RAFVR.
- L. E. West (86048), RAFVR.
- L. B. White (89407), RAFVR.
- A. Whitehead (84438), RAFVR.
- E. Whitehead (83908), RAFVR.
- S. R. Whiting (87443), RAFVR.
- A. E. B. Williams (102962), RAFVR.
- B. H. Williams, DFC, (68820), RAFVR.
- J. Williams (82236), RAFVR.
- J. E. A. Williams, DFC, (40652), Reserve of Air Force Officers (deceased).
- F. L. Wills (75036), RAFVR.
- J. Wilson (70883), Reserve of Air Force Officers.
- F. W. Winstanley (116000), RAFVR.
- A. J. Winyard (134302), RAFVR.
- G. Wright (42780), Reserve of Air Force Officers.
- L. T. Wright (45287).
- R. E. Young (60504), RAFVR.

Flight Lieutenants

- A. E. C. Agate, AFC, (89642), RAFVR.
- H. V. Alexander (117438), RAFVR.
- R. N. G. Allen, DFC, (63484), RAFVR.
- D. M. Anderson (60302), RAFVR.
- M. W. Arthurton, MB, BS, MRCS, LRCP, (120253), RAFVR.
- K. R. Ash (69358), RAFVR.
- H. L. Ashman (106567), RAFVR.
- D. J. Aslin (102097), RAFVR.
- G. B. Atkinson (77618), RAFVR.
- K. L. Barber (79451), RAFVR.
- A. Barker (109499), RAFVR.
- W. T. Barnicot (60627), RAFVR.
- E. Batchelor (100586), RAFVR.
- P. H. Beake (84923), RAFVR.
- J. A. Beare, Reserve of Air Force Officers.
- W. McB. G. Beaton (46859).
- F. Bennett (121916), RAFVR.
- M. R. Besley (115616), RAFVR.
- A. E. Bibb (44854).
- R. H. Blackmore (111098), RAFVR.
- T. V. G. Blanks (106144), RAFVR.
- W. E. Bloomfield (45363).
- G. Bosomworth (140136), RAFVR.
- C. N. H. Bowdler (89444), RAFVR.
- J. E. Boyd (116385), RAFVR.
- R. E. Brandon, LRCP&S, (134287), RAFVR.
- E. G. Brettell, DFC, (61053), RAFVR (deceased).
- E. Brewer (73856), RAFVR.
- W. C. Brodie (49225).
- F. H. Buckley (46364).
- L. G. Bull, DFC, (43932) (deceased).
- S. G. Burdick (86211), RAFVR.
- H. A. Byford (149858), RAFVR.
- A. R. Cadman (45207).
- A. E. Caen (74069), RAFVR.
- C. Campbell (84879), RAFVR.
- A. R. Carfrae (83915), RAFVR.
- G. M. Carter (80946), RAFVR.
- M. J. Casey (39024), Reserve of Air Force Officers (deceased).
- A. A. Castle (108153), RAFVR.
- R. B. Cawood (87231), RAFVR.
- R. C. Chamberlain (109685), RAFVR.
- K. A. Charlton (102122), RAFVR.
- J. Clayton (115635), RAFVR.
- J. H. Coller, DFC, (115590), RAFVR.
- A. H. Comfort (61981), RAFVR.
- C. P. C. Cook (103264), RAFVR.
- A. H. L. Cooper (87766), RAFVR.
- F. C. Cooper (86080), RAFVR.
- C. W. Corless (44H7).
- W. I. Covington, DFC, (119537), RAFVR.
- J. Cummings (79877), RAFVR.
- J. R. Cuthbertson (102256), RAFVR.
- H. L. Dale (49017).
- N. F. W. H. D'Arcy (82029), RAFVR.
- F. J. Dempsey (118546), RAFVR.
- T. E. Dixon (104673), RAFVR.
- I. Donald, MB, BS, MRCS, LRCP, (121388), RAFVR.
- I. A. F. Donnelly (78946), RAFVR.
- I. F. Easton (49430).
- L. R. Edwards (61198), RAFVR.
- R. H. Edwards (42113) (deceased).
- H. M. Elliott (88124), RAFVR.
- W. B. Ellis (102963), RAFVR.
- C. G. Endersby (109366), RAFVR.
- N. G. Errington (115638), RAFVR.
- W. D. C. Erskine-Crum (63421), RAFVR.
- A. L. L. Evans (87722), RAFVR.
- B. H. Evans (42745), Reserve of Air Force Officers (deceased).
- E. Evans (61615), RAFVR.
- H. D. Evans (105231), RAFVR.
- H. Fallows (46002).
- R. Fearon (88801), RAFVR.
- E. R. S. Fendick (45972)
- F. H. Finnis (115733), RAFVR.
- J. R. Fitzmaurice (46041).
- J. C. Ford (43677).
- D. R. Forssander (101783), RAFVR.
- N. J. Freeman (62685), RAFVR.
- A. A. Frisby (88596), RAFVR.
- T. F. Frost (44451).
- W. J. Gardner (44552).
- F. J. Garwood (44477).
- I. D. Gebbie, MB, ChB, DTM&H, (112464), RAFVR.
- R. I. Gray (45910).
- W. P. Gregg (79671), RAFVR.
- D. J. A. Griffiths (131685), RAFVR.
- H. Griffiths (46356).
- W. J. Grisman (45148) (deceased).
- F. Grossman (88841), RAFVR.
- A. D. M. Gunn (60340), RAFVR (deceased).
- C. P. Hall (50896), RAFVR (deceased).
- S. A. Hankey (60422), RAFVR (deceased).
- A. G. Hardy, BM, BCh, MRCS, LRCP, (137263), RAFVR.
- D. G. Harley, (132251), RAFVR.
- J. Harris (47333).
- W. C. Hart (78008), RAFVR.
- G. Hastie (74819), RAFVR.
- A. R. H. Hayter (42124), Reserve of Air Force Officers (deceased).
- W. J. Hayward (110916), RAFVR.
- M. Hecht (129171), RAFVR.
- F. Herbert, Reserve of Air Force Officers.
- R. T. Hodges, DFC, (103016), RAFVR.
- A. C. W. Holland (83245), RAFVR.
- P. H. E. Hope-Ross (60400), RAFVR.
- A. F. Howgate (82768), RAFVR.
- R. V. Hughes (104472), RAFVR.
- E. S. Humphreys (44177) (deceased).
- E. L. Iliffe (81270), RAFVR.
- W. M. Jack (76190), RAFVR.
- A. James (43203).
- A. I. James (60307), RAFVR.
- R. G. James (106586), RAFVR.
- E. Johns, MBE,(46470).
- W. D. Johnston (86021), RAFVR.
- B. Jones (60326), RAFVR.
- R. W. Keates (117635), RAFVR.
- H. Keeling (113956), RAFVR.
- H. H. Keen (82861), RAFVR.
- R. S. Kemp-Scriven (90850), Auxiliary Air Force.
- F. A. Kenney (46060).
- W. C. Ker (80146), RAFVR.
- F. Kerr (84412), RAFVR.
- W. J. W. Kettlewell (90942).
- R. S. Kingsford (102557), RAFVR.
- J. E. Kirkness (115279), RAFVR.
- H. C. Kirsopp (86463), RAFVR.
- W. R. A. Knocker (74333), RAFVR.
- R. T. Knowles (101174), RAFVR.
- P. J. Kydd (82745), RAFVR.
- A. G. Lacy (108040), RAFVR.
- S. W. Landau (111951), RAFVR.
- G. J. Lane (116687), RAFVR.
- A. G. Lang (65954), RAFVR.
- A. R. Laughland, DFC, (44528).
- R. Leggett (103037), RAFVR.
- A. W. G. Le Hardy (132181), RAFVR.
- T. B. Leigh (46462) (deceased).
- G. V. F. Lloyd (115835), RAFVR.
- A. M. Lewis (132371), RAFVR.
- E. H. Lewis (121106), RAFVR.
- D. R. Lishman (81207), RAFVR.
- B. A. Lock (115808), RAFVR.
- J. K. McCabe, MB, BCh, (101824), RAFVR.
- J. Macfarlane (89017), RAFVR.
- K. McI. Mackenzie (126474), RAFVR.
- R. McKimm, DFC, (109137), RAFVR.
- A. Macmillan (100461), RAFVR.
- K. G. Macmillan (73285), RAFVR.
- A. M. A. Majendie (60542), RAFVR.
- B. V. Manders (43930).
- R. P. Manning (48798).
- J. W. Martin (128020), RAFVR.
- G. I. Mason (44965).
- R. H. Matthews (60788), RAFVR.
- T. W. Matthews (108052), RAFVR (deceased).
- J. Maund (50743).
- C. H. Mears (84625), RAFVR.
- A. A. Mellor (86666), RAFVR.
- H. J. Milford (103586), RAFVR (deceased).
- A. Millar (114578), RAFVR.
- G. C. Millichamp (81582), RAFVR.
- J. H. Milne (119356), RAFVR.
- J. W. Minors (46753).
- W. C. C. Morgan (49210).
- G. J. P. Morhen (113485), RAFVR.
- R. Mortimer, MB, BS, (116009), RAFVR.
- F. J. A. Mott (61173), RAFVR.
- R. W. L. Mulliner (115654), RAFVR.
- G. J. N. Neal (105324), RAFVR.
- D. Newton (83377), RAFVR.
- A. C. Nisbet (46265).
- H. A. M. Norton (84830), RAFVR.
- E. C. Ormonde (75643), RAFVR.
- W. J. A. Osburn (77642), RAFVR.
- A. Pedley (48328).
- A. G. Pell (44390).
- C. M. Pell (103292), RAFVR.
- A. L. Pemberton (86948), RAFVR.
- K. W. Pendrey (49145).
- G. E. Phillips, MRCS, LRCP, DPH, (118940), RAFVR.
- R. K. Phillips, MRCS, LRCP, (129257), RAFVR.
- C. A. Pilgrim (46869).
- N. V. Pinder, LDS, (100491), RAFVR.
- W. H. Pinfold (102612), RAFVR.
- A. M. Pollitt (45604).
- J. L. Powell (103039), RAFVR.
- Y. L. Rabin (110263), RAFVR.
- W. B. Rawling (88294), RAFVR.
- S. P. St. C. Raymond (79120), RAFVR.
- R. W. Read (61278), RAFVR.
- T. Rimmer (103528), RAFVR.
- A. B. Rivlin (65955), RAFVR.
- D. G. Robinson (72928), RAFVR.
- D. H. Rowlands, DFC, (122998), RAFVR.
- A. W. Ruffhead (89397), RAFVR.
- W. K. Sankey (62117), RAFVR.
- E. T. Sargent, Reserve of Air Force Officers.
- W. E. Saunders (140218), RAFVR.
- F. Sharpe (83645), RAFVR.
- A. K. Sherwood (118687), RAFVR.
- J. D. Simmonds (131920), RAFVR.
- Le R. A. Skinner (101460), RAFVR.
- R. D. Skyrme (119310), RAFVR.
- L. Slack (121097), RAFVR.
- P. Sleight (114942), RAFVR.
- A. D. Smith (111962), RAFVR.
- C. W. Smith (102662), RAFVR.
- G. F. Smith (66547), RAFVR.
- W. Snowden (45611).
- G. Steel (84348), RAFVR.
- D. H. Steele (101420), RAFVR.
- A. L. Stevens (115546), RAFVR.
- K. Stevens (89333), RAFVR.
- W. J. Stevens (119009), RAFVR.
- I. G. Stewart (44541).
- I. P. Stewart (102575), RAFVR.
- J. G. Stower (107520), RAFVR (deceased).
- D. O. Street (123026), RAFVR (deceased).
- L. C. Sutton (83001), RAFVR.
- C. S. N. Swan (108950), RAFVR.
- C. D. Swain (37658), Reserve of Air Force Officers (deceased).
- R. M. Talbot (63794), RAFVR.
- J. S. Tannahill (63847), RAFVR.
- E. A. Taylor (105159), RAFVR.
- W. E. F. Teague (107812), RAFVR.
- A. F. Thompson (47724).
- P. D. Thompson, DFC, (84697), RAFVR.
- C. F. Tomkins (68099), RAFVR.
- R. O. Trapp (121413), RAFVR.
- C. E. Trippe (77426), RAFVR.
- L. G. Turner (113837), RAFVR.
- E. H. Tyson (79610), RAFVR.
- G. L. Usher (88251), RAFVR.
- L. C. Velluet (108537), RAFVR.
- G. W. Walenn (73022), RAFVR (deceased).
- D. E. Walker (60574), RAFVR.
- L. F. P. Walters (83904), RAFVR.
- E. C. S. Weale (77760), RAFVR.
- N. R. C. White (103033), RAFVR.
- C. J. Williams (44620).
- J. F. Williams (106173), RAFVR (deceased).
- M. Williamson, DFC, (106108), RAFVR.
- K. B. Willis (85844), RAFVR.
- A. F. Wills (83834), RAFVR.
- A. Wilson (44729).
- H. E. Wood, DFC, (87364), RAFVR.
- L. F. S. Wootton (46561).
- P. J. Wylie (83614), RAFVR.
- J. C. Yorke (132330), RAFVR.
- W. H. Youdale (88798), RAFVR.
- F. H. Zeigler (89427), RAFVR.

Acting Flight Lieutenants

- A. V. Albertini (119844), RAFVR.
- F. W. Alderson (123573), RAFVR.
- H. E. Alexander (48539).
- C. Allison (101613), RAFVR.
- A. S. Allwood (135946), RAFVR.
- E. W. Amos (126561), RAFVR.
- W. E. Arnell (114669), RAFVR.
- T. W. Atkinson (123824), RAFVR.
- W. J. G. Attewell (110968), RAFVR.
- D. W. Attwood (135479), RAFVR.
- G. S. Baker (66611), RAFVR.
- R. J. K. Baker (47865), RAFVR.
- W. J. Bannon (63959), RAFVR.
- B. K. Barber (122391), RAFVR.
- G. C. Barnes (114144), RAFVR.
- P. W. Barnes (109410), RAFVR.
- N. Barratt (100214), RAFVR.
- A. S. Bartlett (133314), RAFVR.
- N. Beaumont (46284).
- H. H. Beck (49859).
- F. G. T. Belcham (105862), RAFVR.
- E. F. Belcher (133562), RAFVR.
- W. H. G. Bench (48432).
- E. N. Beswick (47924).
- D. T. Biddle (110869), RAFVR.
- G. W. Birch (102224), RAFVR.
- E. S. Bird (103651), RAFVR.
- J. T. Blackball (100749), RAFVR.
- S. Blumenthal (87299), RAFVR.
- C. N. Bond (67781), RAFVR.
- R. Bottomley (113074), RAFVR.
- S. D. Bowler (101592), RAFVR.
- J. M. Boyd (118934), RAFVR.
- G. C. L. Brigham (60890), RAFVR.
- D. J. Bright (48012), RAFVR.
- C. A. Brown (49957).
- S. C. Brown (103669), RAFVR.
- W. C. Brown (47880).
- S. F. Brownless (144886), RAFVR.
- A. H. C. Bruce (82235), RAFVR.
- E. W. Buckler (106780), RAFVR.
- J. Bunting (49793).
- W. Burns (108252), RAFVR.
- R. W. B. Burton (63926), RAFVR.
- E. J. Cane (134268), RAFVR.
- E. J. Carroll (63929), RAFVR.
- M. Carty (109609), RAFVR.
- P. Cassidy (109611), RAFVR.
- A. E. H. Cattle (117960), RAFVR.
- F. E. Chapman (109171), RAFVR.
- J. K. Cheatle (112064), RAFVR.
- E. W. Chown (105338), RAFVR.
- D. N. Clark (48513).
- W. E. Clarke (135007), RAFVR.
- J. Clement (51187).
- J. H. Clement (126017), RAFVR.
- J. R. Coates (143929), RAFVR.
- A. Cockman (106198), RAFVR.
- E. W. Coleman (107569), RAFVR.
- G. C. Colley (139741), RAFVR.
- S. C. Collins (61098), RAFVR.
- P. E. Colman (50163).
- G. C. Constable (107733), RAFVR.
- D. W. Copley (112081), RAFVR.
- H. Cossar, DFC, (46173).
- T. A. D. Crook (102306), RAFVR.
- F. S. Cunningham, DFM, (106803), RAFVR.
- D. A. Curran (124739), RAFVR.
- H. C. W. Dally (106933), RAFVR.
- S. C. Davey (69573), RAFVR.
- C. Davies (121485), RAFVR.
- J. P. De Pledge (108690), RAFVR.
- H. Diack (136567), RAFVR.
- W. Dickson (48236).
- A. H. Draper, DFC, (42967).
- M. Driscoll (49166).
- P. H. E. Dunn (109738), RAFVR.
- G. G. Dusgate (114257), RAFVR.
- L. T. Eaglesfield (125911), RAFVR.
- J. E. Easthope (86069), RAFVR.
- H. T. Edwards (60388), RAFVR.
- F. C. Eldridge (117525), RAFVR.
- F. X. Erdozain (105230), RAFVR.
- D. Evans (137330), RAFVR.
- H. B. C. Evans (117574), RAFVR.
- F. Fallon (49433).
- D. M. Farquharson (81121), RAFVR.
- D. G. Farrow (106425), RAFVR.
- H. Finch (146174), RAFVR.
- H. Foster (50292).
- R. O. Foster (119430), RAFVR.
- W. E. Fowles (131203), RAFVR.
- A. W. Fraser (102781), RAFVR.
- A. V. Fry, DFC, (122993), RAFVR.
- A. J. P. Furneaux (118821), RAFVR.
- R. Gale (121481), RAFVR.
- F. J. Gibney, MBE,(118086), RAFVR.
- A. Gillespie (107445), RAFVR.
- S. A. Godrich (112122), RAFVR.
- J. S. Gowland (120321), RAFVR.
- C. F. Graham (134745), RAFVR.
- H. Green (50908).
- B. F. Greig (104151), RAFVR.
- A. M. Gunn (111814), RAFVR.
- F. A. Haden (133995), RAFVR.
- A. K. Halsey (120961), RAFVR.
- W. J. Harris (125554), RAFVR.
- W. C. E. Hartley (107595), RAFVR.
- L. G. Harwood (117815), RAFVR.
- E. J. Haslam (50918).
- J. L. Hawley (109629), RAFVR.
- R. H. Hayhoe (103327), RAFVR.
- R. C. Hayman (68244), RAFVR.
- C. O. Heron (112882), RAFVR.
- W. W. Hewitt (139258), RAFVR.
- A. F. Hill (123999), RAFVR.
- F. T. Hill (108710), RAFVR.
- B. P. Hodges (103328), RAFVR.
- R. B. Hodgkinson (62063), RAFVR.
- R. T. Holland, DFC, (48842).
- B. E. Hooke (133542), RAFVR.
- A. Holt (105778), RAFVR.
- V. Hughes (125761), RAFVR.
- J. B. Hunter (63996), RAFVR.
- C. W. Jackson (110919), RAFVR.
- G. H. Jacobsen, AFM, (51075).
- J. F. R. Jones (128559), RAFVR.
- R. J. Jones, BEM, (47775).
- W. E. Jones (123072), RAFVR.
- B. B. Joseph (62478), RAFVR.
- H. L. Karby (111746), RAFVR.
- H. Keenan (125893), RAFVR.
- J. P. Kennedy (123480), RAFVR.
- A. E. Kent (113561), RAFVR.
- W. J. Kerby (117219), RAFVR.
- D. R. S. Kyd (105502), RAFVR.
- R. C. Lambert (50875).
- H. Lewis (130851), RAFVR.
- G. F. Lindsay (115289), RAFVR.
- W. G. Ling (49245).
- D. Livingstone (47612).
- G. J. Lloyd (101742), RAFVR.
- R. W. Lloyd (135146), RAFVR.
- C. G. Loader (51268).
- H. R. Locke (101687), RAFVR.
- G. S. Lodge (136944), RAFVR.
- Y. R. W. Lovegrove (47640).
- M. W. Lowry (107620), RAFVR.
- H. G. Loxdale (121034), RAFVR.
- G. McCallum (111207), RAFVR.
- G. E. McCullagh (48288).
- A. MacDonald (117482), RAFVR.
- J. B. Mahoney (51764).
- P. Maloney, DFC, (136723), RAFVR.
- M. le M. Hanson (120241), RAFVR.
- R. W. Manuel (133030), RAFVR.
- G. E. Marx (66097), RAFVR.
- J. Matthews (123211), RAFVR.
- D. Merrett (50091).
- K. V. Miles (51466).
- W. D. Miller (114918), RAFVR.
- J. Misell (131717), RAFVR.
- H. E. Morris (87733), RAFVR.
- D. W. Munson (133835), RAFVR.
- T. L. Murray (112269), RAFVR.
- J. W. Naylor (51571).
- W. G. Neal (141863), RAFVR.
- J. B. Nelson (107426), RAFVR.
- F. W. Orchard (107808), RAFVR.
- T. N. F. Orr (106832) RAFVR.
- N. E. Page (130043), RAFVR.
- A. F. Pape (113582), RAFVR.
- D. Parker (125342), RAFVR.
- J. C. Parry-Jones (48686).
- I. V. Paterson (102763), RAFVR.
- E. Patterson (103920), RAFVR.
- B. H. Pattinson (121820), RAFVR.
- J. G. Pearse (126525), RAFVR.
- H. T. Petts, DFC, (157326), RAFVR.
- G. J. Pester (117189), RAFVR.
- G. S. Phillips (102721), RAFVR.
- J. T. Pike (50393).
- M. H. Pocock (124960), RAFVR.
- G. A. Podevin (60460), RAFVR.
- A. J. L. Pollen (109650), RAFVR.
- S. W. P. Pooles (104936), RAFVR.
- T. P. Postlethwaite (109090), RAFVR.
- C. H. Prestage (111167), RAFVR.
- C. N. S. Pringle (63127), RAFVR.
- J. R. Pritchard (52332).
- T. A. M. Pritchard (46278).
- J. Purcell, BEM, (127483), RAFVR.
- T. G. Rankin (62131), RAFVR.
- C. S. Reade (31461), Reserve of Air Force Officers.
- I. J. Richards (47946).
- H. Richardson (61849), RAFVR.
- E. G. O. Ridgwell (104818), RAFVR.
- C. W. Ringrose (108972), RAFVR.
- S. W. L. Ripley (117540).
- F. C. Rodwell (111012), RAFVR.
- C. Rogers (123547), RAFVR.
- J. Rogers (126003), RAFVR.
- W. J. Rogers (66641), RAFVR.
- L. R. N. F. J. Roig (112385), RAFVR.
- H. G. Rowe (48344).
- J. Russell (131680), RAFVR.
- L. T. Rye (91011), Auxiliary Air Force.
- T. W. Savage (105167), RAFVR (deceased).
- D. Scott (106401), RAFVR.
- H. J. Scott-Browne (45519).
- E. W. Seabourne, DFC, (105162), RAFVR.
- D. H. Semmence (49002).
- E. J. Sharpe (128384), RAFVR.
- R. Simpson (112248), RAFVR.
- C. A. Sirett (48359).
- G. C. Skeates (103994), RAFVR.
- G. H. Smith (139269), RAFVR.
- S. M. Smith (63998), RAFVR.
- G. Spedding, DFC, (127058), RAFVR.
- A. L. Spiller (62470), RAFVR.
- G. B. Spiller (113015), RAFVR.
- S. R. Stanbridge (134653), RAFVR.
- G. W. Staples (51101).
- R. Stephenson (112841), RAFVR.
- J. E. Stevens (46674).
- W. Stirling (115898), RAFVR.
- F. Stocks (49715), RAFVR.
- L. H. Stowell (106405), RAFVR.
- W. R. Suter (46862).
- S. A. Sutton (109091), RAFVR.
- W. Sykes (49411).
- W. L. Tait (134455), RAFVR.
- A. C. Tapsell (101487), RAFVR.
- C. Taylor (110013), RAFVR.
- W. R. Thompson (134512.), RAFVR.
- H. L. Thorne (121518), RAFVR.
- J. M. Tighe (141022), RAFVR.
- J. Tocher (50549).
- T. E. Trafford (110280), RAFVR.
- J. D. Twidale (119934), RAFVR.
- J. W. J. Underell (131666), RAFVR.
- E. A. Vale (52691).
- J. F. Viveash (47977).
- D. C. F. Waller (107287), RAFVR.
- J. E. Walton (106087), RAFVR.
- J. Ward (115923), RAFVR.
- J. Ward (120493), RAFVR.
- S. A. Warren (50420).
- G. Watson, DFM, (134317), RAFVR.
- G. C. Watkins (144842), RAFVR.
- V. E. M. Watkins, DFM, (48257).
- O. Watson (49465).
- N. W. Weblin (67746), RAFVR.
- L. Wells (50211).
- T. E. Whiting (107493), RAFVR.
- E. G. Wicks (111959), RAFVR.
- C. H. Wiggins (105363), RAFVR.
- A. E. C. Wilkie (49687), RAFVR.
- R. E. Wilkinson, DFC, (124557), RAFVR.
- H. C. L. Williams (103226), RAFVR.
- L. H. Williams (48725).
- G. C. S. Willis (112271), RAFVR.
- A. A. Wilshaw (110288), RAFVR.
- F. B. R. Wilson (130809), RAFVR.
- S. S. Wilson (105219), RAFVR.
- H. G. Wood (130029), RAFVR.
- E. E. Wollen (62128), RAFVR.
- G. A. Wright (114109), RAFVR.
- R. D. Yandell (51254).
- C. H. Young (114111), RAFVR.
- R. Young (49132).
- J. H. Younger (112745), RAFVR.

Flying Officers

- V. Adams (159892), RAFVR.
- D. S. Adshead (52799).
- R. W. Alford (168697), RAFVR.
- C. V. Allen (159887), RAFVR.
- J. C. Allison (124217), RAFVR.
- J. D. Anderson (129690), RAFVR.
- J. S. Angus (138936), RAFVR.
- R. V. B. Arnaboldi (117298), RAFVR.
- A. R. Ashby (147063), RAFVR.
- W. H. Avery (107724), RAFVR.
- E. L. Baines (50389).
- R. A. Baker, AFM, (143896), RAFVR.
- W. Bagnall (142480), RAFVR.
- M. Barker (128444), RAFVR.
- R. E. Barckley (138650), RAFVR.
- G. J. L. Bate (145300), RAFVR.
- T. S. Beckett (50200).
- W. H. Bell (137178), RAFVR.
- C. H. Bennett (108893), RAFVR.
- G. C. Berriman (131724), RAFVR.
- K. R. Blackhurst (142498), RAFVR.
- C. F. Bland (126009), RAFVR.
- A. M. Boyce (136592.), RAFVR.
- R. W. Boxall, MC, (85306), RAFVR.
- W. A. T. Brewer (147505), RAFVR.
- H. G. Briggs (48931).
- N. V. Bristow (124117), RAFVR.
- L. C. Brown (147136), RAFVR.
- R. S. N. Brown (143238), RAFVR.
- D. Cameron, DFM, (146616), RAFVR.
- N. C. Carey (51596).
- J. Carmichael (64992), RAFVR.
- D. H. Chapman (135257), RAFVR.
- F. Chapman (128429), RAFVR.
- R. G. Charlton (139793), RAFVR.
- A. E. Claridge (130753), RAFVR.
- A. Clark, DFC, (147233), RAFVR.
- J. N. Clarke (51188).
- D. B. Clemow (113795), RAFVR.
- D. H. Cochran (122441), RAFVR (deceased).
- L. Coen (149463), RAFVR.
- H. L. C. Cole (136635), RAFVR.
- J. H. Cole, BEM, (159889), RAFVR.
- A. A. G. Combes (148124), RAFVR.
- F. Cooling (137740), RAFVR.
- K. R. Cooper (50076).
- J. A. Coyne (53136).
- S. Cracknell (105877), RAFVR.
- P. J. Crowley (49806).
- A. S. E. Dale (120698), RAFVR.
- D. J. Davies (148406), RAFVR.
- I. S. Davies (143093), RAFVR.
- P. R. Davies (143583), RAFVR.
- J. Davy (141948), RAFVR.
- K. J. Day (139067), RAFVR.
- R. B. Deans (136628), RAFVR.
- M. B. Denning (121618), RAFVR.
- R. J. Dennis (125867), RAFVR.
- A. E. Dishington (159935), RAFVR.
- W. G. Doddington, DFM, (52162).
- J. H. E. Duke (124278), RAFVR.
- R. H. Dunn (138316), RAFVR.
- J. B. Eatock, DFM, (149080), RAFVR.
- J. Edwards, DFM, (159695), RAFVR.
- R. W. Edwards (157634), RAFVR.
- P. J. Eldred (117133), (deceased), RAFVR.
- H. T. Ellis (108697), RAFVR.
- H. N. Evans (142490), RAFVR.
- J. A. P. Evans (138949), RAFVR.
- N. T. Fairfax (129938), RAFVR.
- J. W. Fathers (148201), RAFVR.
- L. Faulkes (148657), RAFVR.
- G. D. Felix (108358), RAFVR.
- M. Finlayson (140159), RAFVR.
- G. E. Fitt (160533), RAFVR.
- A. E. Fort (47757).
- W. H. Francis (132367), RAFVR.
- F. G. Freake (123519), RAFVR.
- E. H. Frost (146644), RAFVR.
- H. St. J. Garland (136344), RAFVR.
- G. L. Garnham (143240), RAFVR.
- W. H. Garratt, (60393), RAFVR.
- W. C. Garrett-Petts (27084).
- J. Gibson (149470), RAFVR.
- F. Glen (142567), RAFVR.
- J. P. F. Goodchild (109900), RAFVR.
- H. D. Goossens (106630), RAFVR.
- A. Gould (48473).
- R. Gould (142614), RAFVR.
- R. E. Gould (139796), RAFVR.
- C. E. M. Graham (159937), RAFVR.
- J. S. Grant (109210), RAFVR.
- A. C. Graves (125514), RAFVR.
- C. C. Grebby (133289), RAFVR.
- R. V. Green (123436), RAFVR.
- D. G. Greville (143449), RAFVR.
- S. H. Guy (159895), RAFVR.
- H. D. Ham (126243), RAFVR (deceased).
- P. L. Hanan (51358).
- T. W. Harper (49188).
- G. F. Haselock (146619), RAFVR.
- F. R. Hatley (143400), RAFVR.
- G. Hawes (109628), RAFVR.
- D. H. Hawkins (158602), RAFVR.
- A. E. Hayward (156446), RAFVR.
- J. A. Keeps (109226), RAFVR.
- R. W. Hegan (129517), RAFVR.
- A. A. Henry (131970), RAFVR.
- A. M. L. Herreman (146066), RAFVR.
- F. L. Hewish (129480), RAFVR.
- H. L. Hewitt (127261), RAFVR.
- F. Hill (131484), RAFVR.
- W. Hill (147883), RAFVR.
- P. F. Hoare (123493), RAFVR.
- M. M. Holmes (103191), RAFVR.
- A. F. Huggett (134617), RAFVR.
- A. H. W. Hurn (48707).
- C. B. Hurrie (133068), RAFVR.
- E. Ingram (135962), RAFVR.
- N. Jackson (136015), RAFVR.
- J. T. James (149602), RAFVR.
- N. Jeffreys (51318).
- P. L. Kelly, BEM, (51110), RAFVR.
- H. A. Kepp-Page (136976), RAFVR.
- D. S. Kerr (129470), RAFVR.
- R. M. Kethro (156044), RAFVR.
- W. H. Kilby (145739), RAFVR.
- D. A. Lafbery (142215), RAFVR.
- C. D. Landeau (112.331), RAFVR.
- H. Langford (50603).
- L. V. Lawrence (137734), RAFVR.
- T. W. Ledingham (149340), RAFVR.
- J. Leitch (104600), RAFVR.
- R. F. Lewis (159933), RAFVR.
- W. R. McK. Lindsay (116434), RAFVR.
- A. F. Little (130765), RAFVR.
- J. Long (140252), RAFVR.
- J. McA. McBride (113888), RAFVR (deceased).
- P. K. McGurk (53345).
- H. H. McKay (140763), RAFVR.
- A. D. McLachlan (145178), RAFVR.
- R. G. Magner (139501), RAFVR.
- R. F. Marrack (139943), RAFVR.
- S. Marsh (159890), RAFVR.
- D. C. Martin (52312).
- W. B. Mathias (132878), RAFVR.
- A. H. Melluish (156041), RAFVR.
- R. G. McG. Melvin (132454), RAFVR.
- J. E. Misseldine (134227), RAFVR.
- E. G. Morgan (121846), RAFVR.
- R. M. Nash (147700), RAFVR.
- D. K. Nelson (157484), RAFVR.
- K. Newby (147920), RAFVR.
- H. W. A. Newman (49385).
- J. K. Newman (49873).
- F. R. Nicholls (130350), RAFVR.
- G. A. Nunn (146150), RAFVR.
- F. M. B. O'Connell (106900), RAFVR.
- H. L. O'Sullivan (101701), RAFVR.
- W. D. Paddy (56446).
- E. Parsons (128825), RAFVR.
- H. A. Penny (139204), RAFVR.
- H. W. Phillips (143912), RAFVR.
- C. W. W. Powell (137019), RAFVR.
- J. A. C. Prescott (138567), RAFVR.
- J. Prideaux (111757), RAFVR.
- J. Quinn (148704), RAFVR.
- W. S. O. Randle (144393), RAFVR.
- N. G. Reading (121224), RAFVR.
- A. P. Reen, DFM, (49996).
- S. A. Rees (123550), RAFVR.
- G. C. Richardson (143372), RAFVR.
- C. G. H. Ricketts (135952), RAFVR.
- F. W. Roberts (134271), RAFVR.
- G. W. Roberts (52310).
- J. Robertson (142232), RAFVR.
- J. S. Robson (138664), RAFVR.
- J. H. N. Rogers (105582), RAFVR.
- J. A. Rowan-Parry (80442), RAFVR.
- S. Salt (112239), RAFVR.
- A. K. Sandifer (156361), RAFVR.
- G. W. Schoon, DFC, (141463), RAFVR.
- C. B. S. Seaman (155951), RAFVR.
- G. Self (156420), RAFVR.
- M. D. Senator (130828), RAFVR.
- H. Settle (134277), RAFVR.
- J. D. Shanahan (117554), RAFVR.
- W. J. Simpson (103217), RAFVR.
- S. H. Siviter (131665), RAFVR.
- R. Skinner (145335), RAFVR.
- C. F. Sloper (51407).
- S. O. Smaliman (160079), RAFVR.
- C. S. Smith (149956), RAFVR.
- D. N. Smith, DFM, (135269), RAFVR.
- E. F. Smith (1352.59), RAFVR.
- A. W. P. Spears (50686).
- W. J. W. Squires (136561), RAFVR.
- B. F. P. Start (110271), RAFVR.
- F. M. Startup (50352).
- S. P. Steavenson (132468), RAFVR.
- R. C. Stewart (130452), RAFVR (deceased).
- F. R. Stone (160519), RAFVR.
- J. P. Studer (144319), RAFVR.
- R. Sutton (145304), RAFVR.
- J. W. Tattersall (156115), RAFVR.
- J. Taylor (51141).
- T. C. Taylor (160620), RAFVR.
- G. A. Terry (132857), RAFVR.
- D. I. Thomas (141183), RAFVR.
- V. F. J. Torrisi (125166), RAFVR.
- G. E. V. Townsend (146292), RAFVR.
- F. J. G. Trim (50311).
- F. A. Tuck (148831), RAFVR.
- A. E. Y. Tulip (148241), RAFVR.
- G. U. Vero (51606).
- A. G. W. Wade (143660), RAFVR.
- R. Wane, MRCS, LRCP, DPH, (113255), RAFVR.
- G. Ware, DFC, (140918), RAFVR.
- G. W. H. Ware (53829).
- D. A. Webb (119890), RAFVR.
- T. M. Welch (133266), RAFVR.
- H. J. Wellard, DFM, (143785), RAFVR.
- D. J. White (140049), RAFVR.
- K. E. N. Whitehall (125555), RAFVR.
- G. Whittle (61548), RAFVR.
- A. S. Williams (139674), RAFVR.
- J. G. Williams (136746), RAFVR.
- S. C. A. Wilson (149445), RAFVR.
- R. S. Wood (138278), RAFVR.
- E. G. Wray (49718).

Pilot Officers

- H. C. Ammett (162871), RAFVR.
- A. E. Ballard (144572), RAFVR.
- E. Barnett (53823).
- A. J. Barson (54177).
- J. Black (172810), RAFVR.
- E. Blanchard (160859), RAFVR.
- D. T. Bone, DFM, (171664), RAFVR.
- T. G. Buckley (170664), RAFVR.
- A. Conway (171793), RAFVR.
- J. A. Dellow (171266), RAFVR.
- L. W. Drake (148961), RAFVR.
- A. E. Evans (54289), RAFVR.
- F. Fairchild (53429).
- E. G. Fisher (53718).
- D. Grant (171708), RAFVR.
- W. Harris (50504).
- T. J. Hedley (149480), RAFVR.
- G. R. Herbert (142149), RAFVR (deceased).
- D. L. Hindle (169654), RAFVR.
- F. Jackson (171791), RAFVR.
- S. Jeapes (170687), RAFVR.
- E. F. J. King (171786), RAFVR.
- E. O. Mackay (162586), RAFVR.
- R. J. A. Macleod (155116), RAFVR.
- F. Melling (53554).
- A. H. Mogridge (162830), RAFVR.
- J. J. Nelson (171920), RAFVR.
- D. E. Owen (172553), RAFVR.
- M. Pearce (161468), RAFVR.
- T. M. Robinson (84938), RAFVR (deceased).
- M. J. Smith (172723), RAFVR.
- J. Stead (160951), RAFVR.
- G. Sutherland (172983), RAFVR.
- R. J. Talbot (161698), RAFVR.
- J. C. Thomson (171693), RAFVR.
- W. D. Tildsley (160627), RAFVR.
- J. W. Watkins (168633), RAFVR.
- R. C. Webster (173076), RAFVR.

Acting Pilot Officer

- T. C. Coombs (53710).

Warrant Officers

- L. C. Adams (366202).
- J. I. Addison (513399)
- B. D. Allen (157641).
- J. Ashmore (564323).
- J. Atkin (329077).
- W. R. Austin (561024).
- L. J. Bamber (350928).
- P. E. Bearne (363802).
- G. A. Bennett (538256).
- J. D. Berryman (590605).
- V. K. Blackley (365225).
- P. G. C. Blunden (355756).
- D. Binns (635063).
- G. Biswell (356065).
- J. R. Bolton (562446).
- W. T. Bond (361669).
- S. Booth (590261).
- W. V. Bowen (525280).
- R. J. Bradley (515336).
- A. H. Brinsley (511440).
- W. A. Broomfield, DFM, (866431), Auxiliary Air Force.
- A. E. Bull (560038).
- F. H. Burgess (590659).
- E. Cartwright (349146).
- K. F. Charlesworth (370810).
- G. A. Clark (590914).
- M. E. W. Clarke (513073).
- T. C. Clarkson (356300).
- C. E. A. Colder (248819).
- A. P. Coleman (507068).
- R. S. Connell (403721).
- B. C. Cooper (366070).
- T. A. Corteen (349476).
- H. W. Crocker (514646).
- H. Dann (511707).
- E. G. Darlington (366262).
- T. Darlington (529693).
- F. Davies (347610).
- R. H. Davis (564623).
- A. E. Day (564152).
- G. W. Ditchburn (521976).
- R. S. Dodds (511117).
- W. W. Dougan. (567164).
- J. S. Dugan (362904).
- M. E. Dunford (365258).
- F. Eatherly (352066).
- A. Edmead (354886).
- L. H. Empson (1261126), RAFVR.
- W. H. Edinburgh (1379496), RAFVR.
- J. Emmins (353340).
- F. G. Fennel (155492).
- W. C. Fenwick (370345).
- J. D. Fish (1376458), RAFVR.
- H. Freeth (301968).
- N. A. H. Garnham (907627), RAFVR.
- I. H. de H. Gibbon (365859).
- W. C. Gloyn (363974).
- W. G. Goodyer (513121).
- A. Gosney (244398).
- T. Grainger (347250).
- J. H. Gray (335147)
- R. G. Greenfield (157164).
- F. Griffiths (329947).
- C. R. Haller (505103).
- R. H. B. Hampson (538383).
- S. Handley (344995).
- C. T. Hattin (349464).
- E. E. Hawkes (514054).
- A. E. Hawkridge (329437).
- K. Hayward (562736).
- T. H. F. Hayward (506553).
- A. V. Henshaw (1166769), RAFVR.
- H. C. Hooper (349099).
- S. E. Humphries (517241).
- C. W. J. Hysted (590583).
- R. Jackson (512713).
- P. G. W. Jacobi (515575).
- P. M. Jacobs (349832).
- J. W. Jenkins (353974).
- P. W. Johnson (363012).
- R. Johnstone (358342).
- A. Jones (344603).
- A. A. Kemster (911654), RAFVR.
- W. T. Killock (342551).
- J. H. W. Lamey (567664).
- E. W. Law (552491).
- S. F. Leaman (333645).
- A. V. Lewis (313805).
- C. E. Little (334441).
- W. A. Lord (10898).
- S. E. Lovelock (505307).
- W. J. D. McCarthy (364950).
- E. W. Mableson (1128014), RAFVR.
- H. Marriott (50835).
- A. J. Marsh (335593).
- G. E. Marshall (561826).
- G. Mason (561274).
- J. E. Mason (155342).
- A. J. May (51110).
- F. C. Mayoh (1325533), RAFVR.
- J. Montgomery (333324).
- J. W. Morgan (346325).
- A. H. Murison (522783).
- G. H. Murray (518682).
- S. O. Musgrove (352106).
- L. R. Newing (365523).
- F. H. Nichols (366365).
- J. T. Norman (512791).
- W. R. O'Hara (341740).
- H. E. Owens (560368).
- L. J. Padbury (615985).
- W. A. Pilling (357324).
- J. E. Potts (351543).
- R. R. Powell (352007).
- F. Priestley (517226).
- M. Proctor (191712).
- A. N. Pryce (356380).
- C. H. Pusey (515871).
- A. H. Richardson (357042).
- H. Richardson, DFM, (618047).
- G. Robberts (514870).
- G. Roffey (518929).
- T. E. Rourke (564287).
- W. L. Rowe (566826).
- A. J. Sabine (353758).
- C. W. Scase (508960).
- F. P. Scullion (590719).
- J. J. Seddon (590540).
- W. J. Sharpe (513014).
- M. A. Sheenan (510720).
- H. E. Sheffield (590049).
- E. F. V. Sherwell (590362).
- T. L. B. Shoolbread (748399).
- A. B. Smith (284).
- C. J. Smith (354398)
- W. Smith (518264).
- J. H. Southworth (355980).
- W. H. Sowden (512618).
- J. S. Sowerby (513130).
- R. Spencer (69).
- P. F. Spurgeon (334422).
- G. L. Stephenson (355057).
- T. G. Stevens (361616).
- R. Stewart (370422).
- R. B. Tancock (510553).
- C. C. Taylor (522197).
- R. Taylor (520732).
- E. Thompson (656095).
- V. C. Thornton (518620).
- R. G. Timms (365068).
- W. E. Tripp (1377051), RAFVR.
- L. T. Tugwell (248058).
- J. E. Turnham (357915)
- T. H. Vallis (337962).
- T. B. Walker (591117).
- A. A. Warren (328645).
- W R. Warren, BEM, (561406).
- W. H. Wedlock (27786).
- G. Weedon (509029).
- J. F. White (224892).
- W. White (356226).
- H. Wilkinson (524683).
- A. Wilkinson (509804).
- S. Willcocks (590760).
- H. Williams (513249).
- H. V. Willmott (356159).
- H. A. Wolf (752075), RAFVR.
- S. C. R. Woollen (514934).
- J. O. M. Yardley (357901).
- E. Young (510906).
- M. W. Young (361755).

Acting Warrant Officers

- G. E. Baker (366025).
- D. Blackmore (561459).
- J. H. Barnes (803170).
- H. Buckley (1123260).
- A. R. Gill (804176), Auxiliary Air Force.
- W. B. Barker (528368).
- A. A. Harrow (335171).
- G. L. Holland (519939).
- D. T. Jenkins (515840).
- C. W. Kidby (366134).
- E. A. Merrifield (761305).
- S. G. Murphy (525937)
- E. J. Perry (353360).
- D. Poole (517990).
- A. W. Pragnell (561077).
- B. A. A. Snook (591019).
- J. A. Martin (364923).
- J. B. Martin (591047).
- G. A. G. Waters (541781).
- J. E. Wiggin (528247).

Flight Sergeants

- 358949 S. J. Alden.
- 902659 A. G. Alderton.
- 365136 L. J. Allen.
- 1430616 G. A. Arrowsmith, RAFVR.
- 563721 W. Auckland.
- 1334065 A. P. Baines, RAFVR.
- 743159 H. M. Ball, RAFVR.
- 1504649 D. D. Balmer, RAFVR.
- 968702 E. Barker, RAFVR.
- 563521 G. W. H. Barkham.
- 560546 W. J. Beale.
- 560242 C. L. Bell.
- 1401790 F. N. Bellamy, RAFVR.
- 568758 D. Bennett.
- 561018 T. Bishop.
- 535296 J. J. Black.
- 649238 S. G. Blunden.
- 348594 S. J. Bollen.
- 563519 G. Booth.
- 1554547 G. G. Boswell, RAFVR.
- 1133622 P. A. Brade, RAFVR.
- 513514 H. M. G. Branch.
- 561067 S. H. Brayley.
- 1337378 H. C. J. Brewer, RAFVR.
- 701215 H. W. Broughton, RAFVR.
- 563446 L. G. Brown.
- 523368 E. W. Browning.
- 561465 R. J. Brindley.
- 353554 A. T. Burgess.
- 1332969 A. W. J. Burns, RAFVR.
- 560549 F. W. Burt.
- 363365 A. F. Butler.
- 624907 D. W. Butler.
- 977647 A. F. Butterworth, RAFVR.
- 532334 J. M. Carine.
- 365215 E. G. Carr.
- 533501 A. Cartwright.
- 562661 L. G. Castle.
- 337498 J. R. Cathmore.
- 1198093 E. J. Chapman, RAFVR.
- 564580 L. J. R. Chedzey.
- 515713 F. H. Chitham.
- 366039 C. J. Clapp.
- 611759 L. Clark.
- 778975 R. M. Clark, RAFVR.
- 355729 W. A. Clark.
- 1002829 R. Clarke, RAFVR.
- 1254288 B. Clegg, RAFVR.
- 565700 R. J. Coad.
- 1193553 D. K. Colburn, RAFVR.
- 365688 J. F. Collins.
- 942863 F. S. Cooper, RAFVR.
- 620297 G. Copley.
- 570150 C. W. Cornish.
- 566654 J. Corser.
- 543058 W. E. Cousins.
- 245690 J. Cowell.
- 370276 E. W. CoX.
- 1268144 E. E. P. Coxall, RAFVR.
- 1795057 S. Craig, RAFVR.
- 816042 W. E. S. Crane, Auxiliary Air Force.
- 1377025 P. H. Crick, RAFVR.
- 560562 R. Cridge.
- 626502 N. Cumber.
- 1257927 W. C. Dawkins, RAFVR.
- 810054 C. N. Davies, Auxiliary Air Force.
- 1308346 W. J. De Bois, DFM, RAFVR.
- 1155403 E. J. Derges, RAFVR.
- 628402 J. Dickenson.
- 1379185 R. D. Dinsdale, RAFVR.
- 364608 N. E. Doe.
- 535486 C. R. Downey.
- 571820 F. W. H. Driver.
- 855864 A. S. Dutton, Auxiliary Air Force.
- 364631 S. J. E. Easton.
- 366092 A. Edington.
- 560747 G. K. England.
- 1314546 O. G. Erasmus, RAFVR.
- 1452227 C. C. Evans, RAFVR.
- 1531761 D. Evans, RAFVR.
- 156114 H. Evans.
- 543011 S. Evans.
- 620331 W. E. Evans.
- 561005 C. E. Faulkner.
- 560113 W. Fawcett.
- 563116 A. H. Ferguson.
- 544217 R. Foote.
- 1144830 F. Fowler, RAFVR.
- 913310 F. W. Foxcroft, RAFVR.
- 644805 G. A. Fraser.
- 1024623 H. Fray, RAFVR.
- 524767 J. T. P. Frith.
- 563454 D. A. Gallagher.
- 568757 V. R. C. Gibbons.
- 1027214 J. Gibson, RAFVR.
- 816031 J. A. Gibson, Auxiliary Air Force.
- 522680 T. B. Glover.
- 652298 F. E. C. Goatman.
- 512628 F. A. W. Good.
- 1007816 E. Goodall.
- 355 B. E. Goodgame.
- 565547 T. A. Gould.
- 811806 L. W. Griffiths, Auxiliary Air Force.
- 576040 W. Griffiths.
- 1271597 S. V. Grimes, RAFVR.
- 563132 B. C. Grimsey.
- 1315823 G. M. Grossman, RAFVR.
- 326138 T. E. Groves.
- 349956 W. E. Haggerty.
- 1484113 G. D. Hakin, RAFVR.
- 1238288 G. E. Hales, RAFVR.
- 567584 W. P. Haley.
- 514370 T. E. Hall.
- 564667 H. J. K. Hammond.
- 515817 H. Harris.
- 519064 R. J. Harris.
- 563155 W. Harris.
- 1355044 F. J. Hart, RAFVR.
- 761110 J. Harvey, RAFVR.
- 658512 L. Hawkes.
- 1204972 W. Headington, RAFVR.
- 1481816 A. Heap, RAFVR.
- 561149 A. W. Herd.
- 335673 C. F. Hersey.
- 540558 B. H. Heyhoe.
- 626803 J. J. Hickey.
- 350144 H. G. Hoad.
- 365020 L. Hoare.
- 351165 J. W. Hodds.
- 750147 J. Hogan, RAFVR.
- 1378564 J. McL. Holms, RAFVR.
- 550413 W. S. Holmes.
- 1162723 B. N. Hoole, RAFVR.
- 1151951 G. D. Hooton, RAFVR.
- 919009 W. T. Hopkins, RAFVR.
- 532891 G. A. Hopgood.
- 560244 D. I. Hoskins.
- 916174 W. J. Houlden, RAFVR.
- 563797 T. J. Howard.
- 567136 T. J. Howard.
- 515218 D. G. C. Humphries.
- 1284322 A. E. W. Hunt, RAFVR.
- 941800 W. H. Hunter, RAFVR.
- 359968 P. S. Hurst.
- 357668 F. T. Hutch.
- 364098 W. C. Hutchins.
- 1380041 J. A. Hutchinson, RAFVR.
- 1291190 H. J. Hutt, RAFVR.
- 1132644 T. H. Hutt, RAFVR.
- 524396 H. N. Ingram.
- 512413 R. S. E. Isherwood.
- 635143 J. Jack.
- 531747 F. A. Jarrett.
- 1166904 D. L. Jeffery, RAFVR.
- 1206789 E. R. Jeffery, RAFVR.
- 624183 E. E. John.
- 541210 J. F. Johnson.
- 938726 W. D. Johnson, RAFVR.
- 335275 E. C. Jones.
- 507925 J. F. Jones.
- 345467 T. Jones.
- 560500 H. A. Jude.
- 616448 F. P. Kelly.
- 981474 H. T. Kemp, RAFVR.
- 656369 J. Kennedy.
- 1288372 E. K. Kettlewell, RAFVR.
- 1172051 A. J. S. E. Kimber, RAFVR.
- 1332766 J. A. Kyte, RAFVR.
- 566359 D. W. Lamplugh.
- 622254 A. J. Last.
- 540210 W. G. Latter.
- 590910 D. P. J. Lean.
- 1180518 J. V. Lee, RAFVR.
- 1551280 J. H. Leiper, RAFVR.
- 349116 J. H. Lever.
- 1184540 R. L. Lincoln, RAFVR.
- 1309285 N. J. Linturn, RAFVR.
- 364882 J. Lloyd.
- 564910 H. Loach.
- 564881 P. H. Lockett.
- 1066584 G. A. Loveday, RAFVR.
- 1467116 L. R. Lovitt, RAFVR.
- 994674 E. T. Lund, RAFVR.
- 516713 R. Lynn.
- 362083 G. F. McConnell.
- 512537 S. R. McCrudden.
- 1377432 G. MacGregor, RAFVR.
- 17734 J. D. McKay.
- 791118 D. McLeish, RAFVR.
- 365301 H. B. Mack.
- 1389205 K. G. W. Mantock, RAFVR.
- 621958 S. J. Maples.
- 501811 N. S. Maryon.
- 347815 W. B. Marshall.
- 562824 C. H. Mason.
- 1378347 G. H. Mewies, RAFVR.
- 938159 K. Midwood, RAFVR.
- 562205 S. Mills.
- 567706 G. Milner.
- 560341 V. W. Moon.
- 2627 568754 D. G. Moore.
- 560849 E. N. Moore.
- 755222 P. Moore, RAFVR.
- 750489 C. G. Morley, RAFVR.
- 1318008 H. E. Morris, RAFVR.
- 564892 J. Morris, RAFVR.
- 1239018 R. Moseley, RAFVR.
- 538492 H. A. Muckle.
- 560350 F. J. Mullins.
- 564780 J. Mumbray.
- 519882 J. Murphy.
- 560339 P. C. Musty.
- 562237 J. A. P. Neill.
- 643033 A. S. Newnham.
- 911646 A. P. Newman, RAFVR.
- 634204 D. J. Norman.
- 356654 W. G. T. Nunn.
- 364911 F. C. Opie.
- 565659 N. W. Padley.
- 521453 A. E. Palmer.
- 777756 D. J. N. Palmer, RAFVR.
- 1386358 H. E. Palmer, RAFVR.
- 1387238 W. P. Pankhurst, RAFVR.
- 1338350 F. C. Parry, RAFVR.
- 1213718 L. A. T. Parsons, RAFVR.
- 1063478 J. Patterson, RAFVR.
- 542640 F. P. G. Payne.
- 562855 F. W. Payne.
- 952728 A. G. Pearson, RAFVR.
- 366367 R. J. Peel.
- 910372 L. Peck, RAFVR.
- 566798 R. A. Pellow.
- 337299 W. J. Penton.
- 565934 F. Perrin.
- 569143 W. D. Perrott.
- 564295 T. A. Peters.
- 752716 R. F. Piercy, RAFVR.
- 566308 C. Pike.
- 510680 E. P. PlLkington.
- 244938 C. F. Pitt.
- 521571 W. Pittam.
- 16013 J. J. Plummer.
- 1077747 E. D. Poulter, RAFVR.
- 1265057 R. W. Price, RAFVR.
- 561618 G. Prior.
- 1479291 H. Pritchard-Roberts, RAFVR.
- 361727 E. D. Proctor.
- 565749 J. M. Ramage.
- 799979 G. R. L. Ramsay, RAFVR.
- 905065 A. W. Ramsey, RAFVR.
- 1179592 B. T. Rea, RAFVR.
- 547497 R. M. Reed.
- 564770 J. C. Rees.
- 937847 D. M. Richmond, RAFVR.
- 388787 C. Rider.
- 510626 E. A. Robins.
- 524926 J. Robinson.
- 517509 R. W. Roe.
- 590737 H. A. Roper.
- 1270344 L. Rose, RAFVR.
- 942736 R. V. Rowley, RAFVR.
- 808138 J. W. Roy, Auxiliary Air Force.
- 366177 H. E. W. Russell.
- 1375672 V. C. Ryder, RAFVR.
- 568678 R. J. Sanders.
- 1132936 K. Sanderson, RAFVR.
- 567310 A. C. Sansom.
- 566424 J. Salt.
- 364288 W. F. Sargent.
- 562289 E. S. C. Sawiders.
- 963374 E. Scott.
- 63651 T. R. Scott.
- 411464 J. L. Seaborne.
- 983777 R. Seddon, RAFVR.
- 562626 R. Shakespeare.
- 565104 C. Sherwood.
- 1306802 D. J. Shiel.
- 551056 R. A. Shore.
- 621194 G. T. Short.
- 364173 A. L. H. Simmonds.
- 353246 W. J. Simpkin.
- 567794 D. Sims.
- 511672 C. F. Skene.
- 548140 J. A. Skilton.
- 566090 J. Small.
- 370064 A. E. Smee.
- 328801 A. E. E. Smith.
- 344122 G. H. Smith.
- 353206 J. Smith.
- 516425 J. W. R. Smith.
- 563217 P. E. Smith.
- 89302 T. W. Smith.
- 565007 A. M. Sobey.
- 1382907 H. F. Spence, RAFVR.
- 251541 P. W. Stanghan.
- 566900 G. W. L. Stanley.
- 560224 J. R. Stares.
- 328969 J. R. Steers.
- 591122 R. Stimson.
- 636773 G. B. Stratford.
- 1109894 J. R. Sutton, RAFVR.
- 566670 E. G. Tarr.
- 565425 F. Thompson.
- 1586246 G. P. Thomson, RAFVR.
- 411460 J. Thomson.
- 565217 G. Timms, RAFVR.
- 1379315 A. Todd.
- 1330282 C. H. W. Tracy.
- 205238 N. S. G. Tweed.
- 1397186 G. H. Tyler, RAFVR.
- 325399 H. A. Vickery.
- 565815 W. C. F. Wade.
- 642275 R. E. Waight.
- 1318811 J. A. Wainwright, RAFVR.
- 562379 A. Waldron.
- 514545 L. F. Warren.
- 749924 S. R. Warsop, RAFVR.
- 1561612 J. J. Waters, RAFVR.
- 616539 C. R. Watson.
- 548157 M. E. Watts.
- 536518 J. Waugh.
- 941377 T. Whitney, RAFVR.
- 959550 J. Wilkord, RAFVR.
- 565831 H. J. M. Wilkinson.
- 564915 R. J. Wilkinson.
- 542111 C. I. Williams.
- 974139 R. Williams, RAFVR.
- 590922 T. Williams.
- 302545 F. Williamson.
- 356242 F. W. H. Williamson.
- 1193918 H. B. Williamson, RAFVR.
- 1015771 R. A. Willis, RAFVR.
- 563594 E. Wilson.
- 351369 L. V. Wilson.
- 537612 W. H. Wilson.
- 1005002 A. L. Winston, RAFVR.
- 1230352 E. Winstanley, RAFVR.
- 937374 W. C. Wood, RAFVR.
- 516953 F. E. Woolley.
- 1268785 G. E. Woolnough, RAFVR.
- 1252626 J. W. Worden, RAFVR.
- 532007 G. P. Wright.
- 159081 H. W. Wright.
- 563242 J. A. Wright.
- 1077241 A. Yates, RAFVR.
- 949572 A. Young, RAFVR.

Acting Flight Sergeants

- 701110 A. E. Acer, RAFVR.
- 744272 C. L. Armstrong, RAFVR.
- 1266318 R. Bentley, RAFVR.
- 970115 S. Blackwood, RAFVR.
- 334169 W. J. Brandon.
- 1006893 G. P. Brooks, RAFVR.
- 507793 H. N. Campbell.
- 965126 W. C. G. Cartwright, RAFVR.
- 59450 W. Crane, RAFVR.
- 632477 P. Docherty.
- 545222 J. A. Donaldson.
- 523369 S. C. Edgecombe.
- 411329 O. O. Evison.
- 1284123 E. J. Finch, RAFVR.
- 911702 K. E. Fountain, RAFVR.
- 1012823 E. Grant, RAFVR.
- 1406945 L. C. Harris, RAFVR.
- 1377299 T. St. C. Harrison, RAFVR.
- 567184 R. L. Hellior.
- 422077 F. L. Hutchinson.
- 1256539 D. J. H. James, RAFVR.
- 550583 M. Jones.
- 1285361 F. F. Keeling, RAFVR.
- 546769 V. McKee.
- 524402 G. P. Mitchell.
- 340579 A. W. H. Morse.
- 529276 G. Mozley.
- 11668 W. A. Needham.
- 1407029 H. B. Niblo, RAFVR.
- 653038 R. R. L. Peers.
- 319894 P. J. Silk, RAFVR.
- 531374 D. G. Smart.
- 954361 R. Smith, RAFVR.
- 753138 R. E. P. Smith.
- 770475 C. R. Stanmore.
- 570732 L. W. Sutton.
- 874796 K. E. Trundle, Auxiliary Air Force.
- 526935 W. W. Watt.
- 1258204 E. T. Wellard, RAFVR.
- 638217 T. E. White.
- 911241 M. J. Wright, RAFVR.

Sergeants

- 1360431 T. G. S. Abbott, RAFVR.
- 1467573 E. P. Adams, RAFVR.
- 962476 L. W. Adams, RAFVR.
- 950257 B. G. Airey, RAFVR.
- 1176533 R. S. Allman, RAFVR.
- 1286073 C. V. Anderson, RAFVR.
- 911958 C. G. Angel, RAFVR.
- 1167084 S. C. W. Annear, RAFVR.
- 914930 A. F. Appleton, RAFVR.
- 615069 G. H.Archbold, RAFVR.
- 292218 B. G. Ashby.
- 548959 L. Ashworth.
- 943364 J. A. Askew, RAFVR.
- 1222226 W. H. Attikin, RAFVR.
- 618012 E. S. Ayling.
- 635811 F. Baker.
- 771963 R. J. Baker, RAFVR.
- 1261742 A. W. Ball, RAFVR.
- 752032 R. J. Ball, RAFVR.
- 1207280 H. G. Barlow, RAFVR.
- 545803 H. Barraclough.
- 10252555. R. Bates, RAFVR.
- 993535 H. M. Battersby, RAFVR.
- 564107 R. R. Batty.
- 1001546 W. Baugh, RAFVR.
- 771164 H. Baxter, RAFVR.
- 198885 J. F. Baxter.
- 1009719 F. Beasley, RAFVR.
- 750753 F. S. Bell, RAFVR.
- 912878 N. Bell, RAFVR.
- 1001090 M. Bentham, RAFVR.
- 548050 H. Bentley.
- 241602 J. H. Bentley.
- 1398326 W. T. Berry, RAFVR.
- 1506919 L. Betteley, RAFVR.
- 1200194 E. A. Betts, RAFVR.
- 1018690 W. H. Blackburn, RAFVR.
- 749753 A. L. Bloomfield, RAFVR.
- 611752 J. Bollands.
- 566936 C. F. Bolt.
- 1052901 J. A. Bolton, RAFVR.
- 813039 I. A. Bonner, Auxiliary Air Force.
- 909688 A. W. Boyce, RAFVR.
- 978843 J. Y. Boyd, RAFVR.
- 520973 S. H. Borner.
- 58299 A. Boyer.
- 542052 R. Boxsey.
- 610668 J. C. Brassington.
- 1150050 R. J. Brend, RAFVR.
- 750660 R. W. Brewer, RAFVR.
- 956799 G. Broadbent, RAFVR.
- 989988 C. G. Broadbridge, RAFVR.
- 568610 K. B. Brock.
- 1175813 D. H. F. Brook, RAFVR.
- 939639 N. W. Brooke, RAFVR.
- 635174 H. F. Broomfield.
- 1196393 A. C. J. Brown, RAFVR.
- 1286044 A. R. Brown, RAFVR.
- 1271069 H. E. Brown, RAFVR.
- 1280101 H. F. Brown, RAFVR.
- 946383 W. Brown, RAFVR.
- 1237650 L. Budd, RAFVR.
- 1188620 R. W. L. Bull, RAFVR.
- 1174780 A. W. C. Burdon, RAFVR.
- 637884 D. A. Burkett.
- 525460 C. E. Burkitt.
- 1161724 G. L. Burrell, RAFVR.
- 1273816 M. E. Burnham, RAFVR.
- 566678 F. N. Buss.
- 903068 H. P. Calvert (deceased), RAFVR.
- 623657 J. Campbell.
- 1301496 R. G. Campbell, RAFVR.
- 771176 T. Campbell, RAFVR.
- 1125669 C. Cannan, RAFVR.
- 559217 W. F. Cannell.
- 809171 G. E. C. Capes, Auxiliary Air Force.
- 979703 R. E. Carey, RAFVR.
- 309331 T. G. Carnell.
- 942386 R. L. Carr, RAFVR.
- 1163521 R. V. Carvell, RAFVR.
- 1375131 R. Cass, RAFVR.
- 1017218 J. E. Cassere, RAFVR.
- 1388853 F. W. Castle, RAFVR.
- 968586 M. H. Castle, RAFVR.
- 1063048 P. B. Chamberlain, RAFVR.
- 1177387 J. P. Chapman, RAFVR.
- 1324408 C. Clark, RAFVR.
- 639694 G. S. Clark.
- 1345168 J. M. S. Clark, RAFVR.
- 1600754 H. G. Clarke, RAFVR.
- 509314 G. Clegg.
- 979289 J. Clegg, RAFVR.
- 1106098 A. H. Cobley, RAFVR.
- 510521 J. C. Cockburn.
- 644899 K. Cochrane.
- 975395 R. P. Coe, RAFVR.
- 560059 W. C. Cogram.
- 1339738 H. H. Cole, RAFVR.
- 1007459 R. S. Cole, RAFVR.
- 770764 W. J. Collett, RAFVR.
- 633596 E. C. Colley.
- 1156931 J. Comper, RAFVR.
- 1202545 A. F. Compton, RAFVR.
- 550013 A. R. Cook (deceased).
- 514634 F. G. Cooper.
- 650507 E. A. Coppen.
- 1221795 F. G. R. Cory, RAFVR.
- 328123 W. M. G. Cossor.
- 1376344 G. A. Cotton, RAFVR.
- 753693 D. C. Cracknell, RAFVR.
- 651886 D. Craggs.
- 1126869 G. T. Craggs, RAFVR.
- 1475338 W. A. Crawshaw, RAFVR.
- 517473 R. Crompton.
- 526181 R. H. Croxford.
- 908087 F. T. Cuckow, RAFVR.
- 912502 F. W. Curling, RAFVR.
- 1183892 S. Dabson, RAFVR.
- 514788 R. W. Daintrey.
- 978360 J. G. W. Dale, RAFVR.
- 909196 I. Davies, RAFVR.
- 529766 J. R. Davies.
- 1580346 V. W. Davies, RAFVR.
- 1055875 H. Davis, RAFVR.
- 551897 J. M. Davis.
- 1191341 C. N. Dawson, RAFVR.
- 1377492 J. A. Dawson, RAFVR.
- 1172547 W. A. Day, RAFVR.
- 976598 C. R. Delf, RAFVR.
- 1273037 F. G. Delfosse, RAFVR.
- 994271 W. Dickens, RAFVR.
- 1001647 E. Dimaline, RAFVR.
- 915924 G. H. Doman, RAFVR.
- 630157 J. J. Doyle.
- 526159 J. A. Drewell.
- 1203268 R. Drury, RAFVR.
- 620199 R. C. Dunn.
- 619461 J. D. Dwyer.
- 747107 T. W. Eade, RAFVR.
- 534487 S. G. Easingwood.
- 1009226 E. H. Eastbury, RAFVR.
- 906633 C. W. E. P. Edwards, RAFVR.
- 640411 V. Edwards.
- 568799 P. Elms.
- 540603 F. Elston.
- 1011757 G. A. Elston, RAFVR.
- 524278 D. A. Evans.
- 572560 G. Everitt.
- 618908 J. S. Farquhar.
- 527892 F. Farren.
- 905843 H. E. Featherstone, RAFVR.
- 1200850 S. H. Finlay, RAFVR.
- 970457 C. V. Ford, RAFVR.
- 1254985 J. R. G. Fordham, RAFVR.
- 971460 A. G. Foster, RAFVR.
- 1193600 A. S. R. Fox, RAFVR.
- 959771 H. C. Freegard, RAFVR.
- 1391242 C. J. Frenchum, RAFVR.
- 1210091 H. G. Froggatt, RAFVR.
- 516234 C. A. Frogley.
- 1084240 R. T. Frost, RAFVR.
- 622644 A. K. Furze.
- 622166 F. Gadsby.
- 908489 W. W. Garbett, RAFVR.
- 941920 V. H. Gardham, RAFVR.
- 1199776 W. Garside, RAFVR.
- 743293 C. A. Gathercole, RAFVR.
- 808527 E. Gaukroger, Auxiliary Air Force.
- 357612 F. Gee.
- 1013595 A. M. Gellatly, RAFVR.
- 576370 J. Gittings.
- 1020225 H. J. Gledhill, RAFVR.
- 916467 R. R. Goddard, RAFVR.
- 1118507 H. Gore, RAFVR.
- 513856 W. H. Gould.
- 341878 J. Graves.
- 1287214 L. J. A. Gray, RAFVR.
- 816095 W. Greer, Auxiliary Air Force.
- 525554 R. J. Groves.
- 513756 W. H. Guard.
- 990398 C. E. Hackett, RAFVR.
- 1208795 C. F. Hadland, RAFVR.
- 517722 J. L. Hagger.
- 1345564 W. Haining, RAFVR.
- 1484113 G. D. Hakin, RAFVR.
- 979997 K. H. Halewood, RAFVR.
- 571236 D. E. Hall.
- 514089 F. W. Hall.
- 808137 J. Hall, Auxiliary Air Force.
- 1060064 S. Hallmark, RAFVR.
- 1241818 R. F. F. Hammond, RAFVR.
- 569573 J. E. Harbottle.
- 1091930 S. Hardaker, RAFVR.
- 1193170 A. O. Harden, RAFVR.
- 972175 W. Harley, RAFVR.
- 574040 P. B. Harris.
- 650776 T. Harris.
- 1431226 A. G. Harrison, RAFVR.
- 1378626 H. G. Harrison, RAFVR.
- 1204669 H. H. A. Harrison, RAFVR.
- 1188655 H. F. J. Hart, RAFVR.
- 1376213 J. M. Hartman, RAFVR.
- 957561 A. E. Hartshorn, RAFVR.
- 546547 C. E. Harvey.
- 936338 R. Haward, RAFVR.
- 24633 F. R. Hawksworth, RAFVR.
- 1078009 J. Hayhurst, RAFVR.
- 1110535 K. G. Hazelton, RAFVR.
- 1246830 S. G. Heather, RAFVR.
- 919624 A. H. Heaven, RAFVR.
- 1437563 W. Hemingway, RAFVR.
- 750261 E. F. Hemmings, RAFVR.
- 540151 J. N. Hempstead.
- 973643 S. L. Henry, RAFVR.
- 936741 J. Higginson, RAFVR.
- 540544 E. L. Hill, RAFVR.
- 648952 G. G. W. Hoadley.
- 749471 K. S. Hoar, RAFVR.
- 1382896 T. H. Hobbs, RAFVR.
- 1063603 A. T. Hodge, RAFVR.
- 1178022 T. W. Hodges, RAFVR.
- 1035161 W. R. Hodges, RAFVR.
- 937431 W. C. Holden, RAFVR.
- 1250944 W. G. Holder, RAFVR.
- 1477891 J. H. Holmes, RAFVR.
- 1583200 T. S. Holmes, RAFVR.
- 505150 S. W. Hood.
- 902801 H. Hornby, RAFVR.
- 249302 C. W. Horner.
- 1035423 S. Horton, RAFVR.
- 1443135 H. Hounsome, RAFVR.
- 847174 E. E. S. Howard, Auxiliary Air Force.
- 1570068 A. H. Howat, RAFVR.
- 753270 W. C. Hudson, RAFVR.
- 956073 A. A. Hulston, RAFVR.
- 1008801 E. Illingsworth, RAFVR.
- 591222 A. R. Ingram.
- 980324 F. E. Jackson, RAFVR.
- 915839 P. L. H. Jackson, RAFVR.
- 1281563 S. A. Jaggar, RAFVR.
- 568736 G. M. Jarratt.
- 353194 J. J. Jay.
- 567367 G. T. Johnson.
- 941588 J. W. H. Johnson, RAFVR.
- 1672871 W. Johnson, RAFVR.
- 970000 J. P. Johnstone, RAFVR.
- 1410146 I. H. Jones, RAFVR.
- 549184 P. M. Jones.
- 1432441 R. Jones, RAFVR.
- 991925 R. J. Jones.
- 924612 T. B. Jones.
- 567632 R. H. Juliff, RAFVR.
- 908857 R. H. Keeble.
- 912224 L. E. Keemar.
- 942173 V. E. Keen.
- 1698466 H. J. Keenan, RAFVR.
- 640947 W. Kennaway, RAFVR.
- 1007767 C. Kenyon, RAFVR.
- 994963 G. W. Kershaw.
- 746660 K. Kettle, RAFVR.
- 1194505 S. W. Kibbler, RAFVR.
- 570402 R. C. Kidd.
- 1254474 L. R. W. King, RAFVR.
- 1617961 R. Krammer, RAFVR.
- 538733 R. Lambert.
- 355203 L. C. Larking.
- 1083582 V. Laverick, RAFVR.
- 77858 J. H. Ledger, RAFVR.
- 337538 A. E. Lee.
- 618041 L. N. Lee.
- 1012930 J. N. Leishman, RAFVR.
- 1483213 J. J. Little, RAFVR.
- 702904 R. G. Lloyd, RAFVR.
- 1160616 R. G. Lock, RAFVR.
- 942562 B. H. Locke, RAFVR.
- 1158128 A. C. Lodge, RAFVR.
- 1017340 J. M. Loftus, RAFVR.
- 522177 P. J. Loughran.
- 1267835 D. J. Lucas, RAFVR.
- 517932 S. K. Lumsdale.
- 626278 J. McCallum.
- 1341367 J. S. McCallum, RAFVR.
- 874726 H. McCrea, Auxiliary Air Force.
- 925858 C. McCullough, RAFVR.
- 362085 D. J. MacDonald.
- 541372 F. McDonald.
- 1002187 W. C. MacDonald, RAFVR.
- 344656 S. S. MacFarlane.
- 1451464 W. H. McGarrighan, RAFVR.
- 1102384 G. McGeachie, RAFVR.
- 537529 J. McKinloy.
- 340038 D. McLaughlin.
- 1014596 A. S. McPhail, RAFVR.
- 1454953 A. Madigan, RAFVR.
- 1451686 N. Madsen, RAFVR.
- 902374 B. C. Mahoney, RAFVR.
- 634572 T. F. Maiden.
- 916326 D. J. Major, RAFVR.
- 756704 W. Mant, RAFVR.
- 1154516 V. Mason, RAFVR.
- 992996 R. D. Matthews, RAFVR.
- 968091 W. Meace, RAFVR.
- 1326584 A. H. Meadows, RAFVR.
- 99515 J. R. J. Mills, RAFVR.
- 649561 R. Mills.
- 335179 W. G. Mitchell.
- 1118189 G. E. Moffitt, RAFVR.
- 1187056 H. J. Moore, RAFVR.
- 654344 R. T. Moore.
- 1061325 S. Morgan, RAFVR.
- 1579539 C. W. Morley, RAFVR.
- 1334588 R. M. Morris, RAFVR.
- 1391128 J. R. R. Mount, RAFVR.
- 564952 F. M. B. Mullarkey.
- 78395 R. H. Mullins, RAFVR.
- 1303293 T. H. Naylor, RAFVR.
- 570008 I. A. Neilson.
- 610742 L. K. Nixon.
- 1188052 F. A. Nobbs, RAFVR.
- 534980 W. R. Nottingham.
- 329311 C. Nunn.
- 979198 T. C. Oakley, RAFVR.
- 1326725 M. O'Hagan, RAFVR.
- 521583 D. D. O'Kane.
- 1240406 H. Oliver, RAFVR.
- 531109 R. J. Opie.
- 534731 E. R. Osborne.
- 1087870 T. A. Osborne, RAFVR.
- 523293 I. R. Osman.
- 619639 N. Owen.
- 1119068 W. H. P. Owen, RAFVR.
- 1213615 S. Oxley, RAFVR.
- 801548 H. Page, Auxiliary Air Force.
- 701207 C. J. Painter, RAFVR.
- 527107 D. J. Paling.
- 508187 A. E. Parker.
- 1459239 D. J. Parker, RAFVR.
- 915051 G. H. E. Parker, RAFVR.
- 1031251 G. S. Parker, RAFVR.
- 1268666 P. J. Parker, RAFVR.
- 994280 R. Parkinson, RAFVR.
- 532158 D. A. R. Parr.
- 574981 F. J. Partridge.
- 1557969 J. R. Parvin, RAFVR.
- 947150 R. Paton, RAFVR.
- 1658659 L. A. Pearce, RAFVR.
- 1393850 P. Pearl, RAFVR.
- 567774 T. M. Pearson.
- 926974 R. Peters, RAFVR.
- 1557619 J. Picken, RAFVR.
- 567733 H. G. Pickering.
- 362545 R. A. Pikesley.
- 936281 W. J. Plumb, RAFVR.
- 1180135 H. F. Pollen, RAFVR.
- 610642 J. Pomfret.
- 1222677 F. S. Poole, RAFVR.
- 960313 G. R. Poole, RAFVR.
- 1262801 E. E. Pooley, RAFVR.
- 971371 P. Porter, RAFVR.
- 1194016 E. A. W. Powell, RAFVR.
- 638442 R. A. W. Price.
- 1173552 K. M. Priest, RAFVR.
- 960075 E. T. Probert, RAFVR.
- 522225 G. Purcell.
- 575245 H. J. Pyke.
- 1609399 F. J. Pyle, RAFVR.
- 1397881 J. E. Rainsford, RAFVR.
- 647735 O. Ramsden.
- 1215960 E. J. Rand, RAFVR.
- 907548 L. W. Ranson, RAFVR.
- 1443887 R. L. Rawkins, RAFVR.
- 647052 T. W. Reed.
- 575147 P. J. Reen.
- 569448 J. R. Rees.
- 701085 W. Reeves, RAFVR.
- 920054 J. W. Reid (deceased), RAFVR.
- 990677 E. J. Renshaw, RAFVR.
- 1266947 G. R. Restall, RAFVR.
- 953092 C. J. Reynolds, RAFVR.
- 816047 J. Reynolds, Auxiliary Air Force.
- 540556 J. M. D. Richards.
- 625031 W. S. Richards.
- 535243 J. F. Richardson.
- 544185 A. G. Ricketts.
- 1293688 E. Ridley, RAFVR.
- 643945 A. Roberts.
- 1435093 D. F. Roberts, RAFVR.
- 642286 H. Roberts.
- 552488 L. C. Roberts.
- 1659588 G. W. Robertshaw, RAFVR.
- 1244938 G. R. E. Robertson, RAFVR.
- 1007347 T. Robertson, RAFVR.
- 618467 E. Robinson.
- 1148035 J. Robinson, RAFVR.
- 904325 J. C. Robinson, RAFVR.
- 537181 F. E. Robson.
- 1173889 E. A. Rolfe, RAFVR.
- 943995 F. Roper, RAFVR.
- 517047 C. W. Rose.
- 1057055 D. Rose, RAFVR.
- 640422 R. Rowe.
- 971176 S. Rowland, RAFVR.
- 777846 A. Rubenstein, RAFVR.
- 1053715 F. C. Rushton, RAFVR.
- 955842 W. G. Sackett, RAFVR.
- 1541060 W. G. Salmon, RAFVR.
- 909290 R. S. Sander, RAFVR.
- 1056630 H. Sanderson, RAFVR.
- 1261549 A. R. Sandoe, RAFVR.
- 1213122 P. R. Sartain, RAFVR.
- 1188618 H. S. Scawen, RAFVR.
- 1393632 R. A. Schlesinger, RAFVR.
- 941794 R. S. Scott, RAFVR.
- 1191568 F. E. Seaton, RAFVR.
- 933321 A. F. Selway, RAFVR.
- 566958 I. A. Shaw.
- 1077978 A. Sheekey, RAFVR.
- 629994 K. D. Sholl.
- 1028150 J. SlDebotham, RAFVR.
- 614784 H. E. Simpson.
- 1008848 J. H. Simpson, RAFVR.
- 652940 C. E. Smith.
- 1280367 E. A. Smith, RAFVR.
- 1129488 J. Smith, RAFVR.
- 992799 R. D. J. Smith, RAFVR.
- 540663 S. G. Snellgrove.
- 1030242 L. P. Spencer, RAFVR.
- 1358580 C. Staerck, RAFVR.
- 340815 C. C. Standing.
- 1330648 C. B. Statham, RAFVR.
- 1394647 F. W. Steed, RAFVR.
- 1074939 J. A. Steele, RAFVR.
- 532601 W. Steele.
- 939518 P. F. Stephens, RAFVR.
- 1358226 G. W. Stephenson, RAFVR.
- 753139 R. H. Steventon, RAFVR.
- 1202324 C. S. Stokes, RAFVR.
- 1022872 W. Struthers, RAFVR.
- 1045962 J. Stuthert, RAFVR.
- 1104316 C. P. Sutton, RAFVR.
- 943387 J. Swallow, RAFVR.
- 1078158 E. M. Swingler, RAFVR.
- 1402992 E. S. Sykes, RAFVR.
- 617269 G. T. Synnock.
- 620810 D. V. Tann.
- 1294244 L. R. Tanner, RAFVR.
- 1066982 H. E. Taylor, RAFVR.
- 1317370 D. F. Thomas (deceased), RAFVR.
- 1378005 G. B. Thomas, RAFVR.
- 901618 J. H. J. Thomas, RAFVR.
- 647521 W. R. Thomas.
- 1005844 S. J. Thompson, RAFVR.
- 870814 W. H. Thompson, Auxiliary Air Force.
- 611909 L. K. Till.
- 974398 R. H. Tomlinson, RAFVR.
- 1105460 C. H. Topping, RAFVR.
- 641779 J. E. Torkildsen.
- 651272 A. J. Trevis.
- 1264277 W. G. Tucker, RAFVR.
- 771153 A. J. Tucker, RAFVR.
- 1388544 D. R. Tulloch, RAFVR.
- 1136149 T. D. Turnbull, RAFVR.
- 159965 A. T. Turner, RAFVR.
- 1218505 B. A. Turner, RAFVR.
- 954971 G. Turner, RAFVR.
- 753653 H. D. M. Turner, RAFVR.
- 1482218 T. F. Twitchett, RAFVR.
- 925970 F. J. Twydell, RAFVR.
- 990061 N. A. Upton, RAFVR.
- 945520 A. F. M. Vanderstock, RAFVR.
- 1461718 L. S. Vanner, RAFVR.
- 1155775 L. H. Vorley, RAFVR.
- 978899 K. Walker, RAFVR.
- 1284184 W. J. Walker, RAFVR.
- 1647345 W. A. Walmsley, DFM, RAFVR.
- 942934 J. Walsh, RAFVR.
- 1408297 W. H. A. Walters, RAFVR.
- 362220 H. Wareing.
- 1432569 L. G. Warminger, RAFVR.
- 1283409 W. J. Warr, RAFVR.
- 1263286 E. H. Warren, RAFVR.
- 1195797 H. A. Warren, RAFVR.
- 1029258 I. S. Warren, RAFVR.
- 356755 W. A. Warrington.
- 931034 G. C. Watkins, RAFVR.
- 522921 J. Watson.
- 641954 L. Watson.
- 973517 D. Webster, RAFVR.
- 613066 H. Weetcroft.
- 1409314 F. E. Welland, RAFVR.
- 987272 T. H. Welsh, RAFVR.
- 1694651 D. J. Welsteed, RAFVR.
- 64933 A. W. West.
- 1077746 R. W. West, RAFVR.
- 908925 L. W. Westlake, RAFVR.
- 918928 A. J. H. Westley, RAFVR.
- 1189979 F. G. Wheeler, RAFVR.
- 940111 R. G. Whitaker, RAFVR.
- 516640 V. R. White.
- 1191380 N. H. Whiting, RAFVR.
- 537277 J. Whitton.
- 637396 F. B. Wilding.
- 1061157 A. Wilkinson, RAFVR.
- 1465381 D. E. Williams, RAFVR.
- 1177814 H. G. Williams, RAFVR.
- 1257986 L. Williams, RAFVR.
- 918191 R. A. Williams, RAFVR.
- 960472 T. B. Williams, RAFVR.
- 551903 D. G. Willocks.
- 923513 F. J. Willoughby, RAFVR.
- 1138798 J. S. Wilson, RAFVR.
- 633770 W. C. A. Wilson.
- 1670169 A. E. Winyard, RAFVR.
- 964377 F. A. Wooding, RAFVR.
- 1123606 R. R. H. Worthington, RAFVR.
- 1220969 E. H. Wright, RAFVR.
- 569423 R. Wright.
- 1160036 R. C. Yates, RAFVR.
- 1127192 L. Yeomans, RAFVR.
- 1465418 W. R. H. Yexley, RAFVR.
- 355472 F. J. Young.

Acting Sergeants

- 1420795 C. F. N. Cockerill, RAFVR.
- 918365 J. H. A. Cowen, RAFVR.
- 1258572 D. F. Gallagher, RAFVR.
- 525668 M. J. Kelly.
- 919658 G. C. Morton, RAFVR.
- 1016626 H. Rothwell, RAFVR.
- 1301750 R. F. Taylor, RAFVR.
- 744897 K. C. Twaite, RAFVR.
- 1175007 J. D. A. Vaughan, RAFVR.
- 1190025 R. Watson, RAFVR.

Corporals

- 1101278 C. D. Abernethy, RAFVR.
- 1072456 L. G. Adams, RAFVR.
- 996090 T. R. Aitchison, RAFVR.
- 1366694 C. Alexander, RAFVR.
- 638458 G. O. A. Algar.
- 1611847 G. E. Allen, RAFVR.
- 1166562 A. E. Allsop, RAFVR.
- 1502359 C. A. Anderson, RAFVR.
- 925103 W. F. Angel, RAFVR.
- 778205 A. Armstrong, RAFVR.
- 1118540 R. N. Arthur, RAFVR.
- 1410805 J. D. Ashplant, RAFVR.
- 1063209 N. Ashurst, RAFVR.
- 1106371 J. H. Aspinall, RAFVR.
- 115448 H. Atkinson, RAFVR.
- 757569 R. J. Avis, RAFVR.
- 1219362 K. G. Avison, RAFVR.
- 1023758 L. G. Bailey, RAFVR.
- 913067 T. E. Baily, RAFVR.
- 1258318 M. R. Baker, RAFVR.
- 644734 W. A. Ball.
- 650226 C. J. Barrow.
- 907221 I. C. Bartlett, RAFVR.
- 917013 S. Basham, RAFVR.
- 1305382 S. H. Bastian, RAFVR.
- 750262 S. E. Bate, RAFVR.
- 943309 L. Beall, RAFVR.
- 624627 T. J. C. Bedford.
- 1144729 W. Bedford, RAFVR.
- 635245 H. Beech.
- 1088615 A. Bell, RAFVR.
- 1030865 R. A. Belsham, RAFVR.
- 1008826 C. Benson, RAFVR.
- 640368 C. J. Berry.
- 1028621 S. R. Berry, RAFVR.
- 547991 R. H. Best.
- 959114 H. H. Billing, RAFVR.
- 1293220 G. F. Birch, RAFVR.
- 1259697 R. F. Bird, RAFVR.
- 951604 H. H. Boaden, RAFVR.
- 970385 H. E. Bolt, RAFVR.
- 1041699 C. Boocock, RAFVR.
- 1035877 J. K. Booth, RAFVR.
- 988257 G. A. Bootland, RAFVR.
- 1171566 G. L. Borley, RAFVR.
- 1150986 J. W. Borley, RAFVR.
- 1163834 L. S. Boyce, RAFVR.
- 935843 L. W. Bradley, RAFVR.
- 973362 T. J. Bradley, RAFVR.
- 614808 F. Bradwell.
- 641316 T. D. Brady.
- 1259621 R. Brand, RAFVR.
- 1350918 R. A. Brehaut, RAFVR.
- 1217638 J. O. Brewe, RAFVR.
- 615209 S. Brighton.
- 1058764 F. Broadbent, RAFVR.
- 1028869 H. Broadbent, RAFVR.
- 1653371 L. T. Brock, RAFVR.
- 1371456 S. A. Broderick, RAFVR.
- 813230 E. C. Brooks, Auxiliary Air Force.
- 1201668 J. E. Brooks, RAFVR.
- 958016 D. Broomhead, RAFVR.
- 870931 B. T. Brown, Auxiliary Air Force.
- 1515758 G. S. Brown, RAFVR.
- 1175690 H. F. Brown, RAFVR.
- 1130236 H. G. Brown, RAFVR.
- 1186557 J. D. Brown, RAFVR.
- 1154770 M. Brown, RAFVR.
- 961955 R. Brown, RAFVR.
- 1026250 R. F. S. Brown, RAFVR.
- 547517 T. N. Brown.
- 1188453 G. W. Bruce, RAFVR.
- 1019765 W. J. Brunton, RAFVR.
- 1208109 E. C. Bull, RAFVR.
- 1156884 N. Bumstead, RAFVR.
- 1031923 J. R. Bunn, RAFVR.
- 1198266 J. Burroughs (deceased), RAFVR.
- 1015652 J. H. Burton, RAFVR.
- 1272920 E. C. Butcher, RAFVR.
- 1200527 E. R. P. Cadwallader, RAFVR.
- 1503488 T. K. Carruthers, RAFVR.
- 1023754 C. R. Carter, RAFVR.
- 1443316 J. Carter, RAFVR.
- 1617610 A. J. G. Carthy, RAFVR.
- 1210029 S. Cartlidge, RAFVR.
- 1019654 C. Cartwright, RAFVR.
- 1380242 E. A. Cavalier, RAFVR.
- 916999 E. L. Chalk, RAFVR.
- 924263 L. W. Chalk, RAFVR.
- 622471 W. L. Chalmers.
- 1357661 F. C. Chiddention, RAFVR.
- 625941 G. F. W. Chirgwin.
- 1347544 A. C. Christie, RAFVR.
- 936330 D. H. Clamp, RAFVR.
- 1280731 K. G. Clarke, RAFVR.
- 1123945 H. Clifford, RAFVR.
- 1371659 W. O. Clubb, RAFVR.
- 2215751 A. Cluderay, RAFVR.
- 1086065 V. S. Coggon, RAFVR.
- 842547 S. C. Coking, Auxiliary Air Force.
- 924903 W. G. Cole, RAFVR.
- 944510 G. W. Collinson, RAFVR.
- 1469106 J. H. Colsell, RAFVR.
- 1110979 P. Comer, RAFVR.
- 968805 E. G. Conium, RAFVR.
- 1156930 J. A. C. Constable, RAFVR.
- 995011 G. A. Cook, RAFVR.
- 933882 W. H. Cook, RAFVR.
- 1150898 R. N. Cooper, RAFVR.
- 990698 S. G. Cooper, RAFVR.
- 623099 V. A. Cooper.
- 1272189 R. D. Copperwheat, RAFVR.
- 947363 W. F. Copson, RAFVR.
- 1223450 H. L. Corbett, RAFVR.
- 994872 K. Corbin, RAFVR.
- 905576 A. A. Cordes, RAFVR.
- 1072021 A. Cotgreave, RAFVR.
- 1482799 W. Coulson, RAFVR.
- 912819 W. T. Cowell, RAFVR.
- 999679 J. Crain, RAFVR.
- 1119652 A. Croadsdell, RAFVR.
- 954164 H. Crown, RAFVR.
- 1002420 S. Cubbison, RAFVR.
- 14644007 C. G. Currell, RAFVR.
- 1365166 W. S. Currie, RAFVR.
- 1134010 H. Cutts, RAFVR.
- 650914 R. Daniel.
- 637284 E. A. Daniels.
- 1443075 J. D'Armody, RAFVR.
- 1204495 A. Davies, RAFVR.
- 1137707 D. T. Davies, RAFVR.
- 1101405 J. E. Davies, RAFVR.
- 935650 T. C. Davies, RAFVR.
- 11617351 E. W. Davis, RAFVR.
- 1167080 W. G. Deakin, RAFVR.
- 543569 E. Deaville.
- 1246694 J. E. Dee, RAFVR.
- 1290650 A. C. Denne, RAFVR.
- 1062649 V. M. Denver, RAFVR.
- 553731 G. H. H. Diaper.
- 981814 B. A. Dillon, RAFVR.
- 642589 D. E. A. F. Diplock.
- 1034856 H. A. Dobson, RAFVR.
- 943605 R. Dobson, RAFVR.
- 1200442 H. P. Dodd, RAFVR.
- 1063707 C. Dodds, RAFVR.
- 1358497 G. E. Dorsett, RAFVR.
- 1223774 E. G. Dove, RAFVR.
- 911933 H. D. Dowsett, RAFVR.
- 1253569 H. C. Driver, RAFVR.
- 1359927 A. Duguid, RAFVR.
- 1158684 F. J. Dunkley, RAFVR.
- 747390 D. Y. Durrant, RAFVR.
- 984221 W. A. Duthie, RAFVR.
- 1272749 G. Dyball, RAFVR.
- 908171 H. W. Earthroll, RAFVR.
- 1271155 W. A. Eatten, RAFVR.
- 777811 S. Ebedes, RAFVR.
- 1032839 N. Edmondson, RAFVR.
- 981939 J. W. Edwards, RAFVR.
- 1223098 W. A. Ekins, RAFVR.
- 1222389 F. C. Elliott, RAFVR.
- 1089672 F. Ellis, RAFVR.
- 952516 R. Emmerson, RAFVR.
- 966616 H. A. Evans, RAFVR.
- 1063989 R. P. Evans, RAFVR.
- 1123070 K. H. Fairbotham, RAFVR.
- 1057455 L. T. Farey, RAFVR.
- 1213023 G. F. Farrow, RAFVR.
- 1128635 H. Fergusson, RAFVR.
- 1281965 E. E. Flack, RAFVR.
- 1119893 R. W. H. Flack, RAFVR.
- 1055625 J. R. Flemans, RAFVR.
- 1185984 F. G. Fletcher, RAFVR.
- 1259290 H. A. Fletcher, RAFVR.
- 1279433 W. E. Fletcher, RAFVR.
- 953182 L. G. W. Foden, RAFVR.
- 1110885 W. S. Forbes, RAFVR.
- 990609 G. S. Fowler, RAFVR.
- 1084373 R. G. Francis, RAFVR.
- 1017618 J. Fraser, RAFVR.
- 1186574 B. K. Freeman, RAFVR.
- 1291461 R. T. Fuller, RAFVR.
- 1205353 L. G. Furber, RAFVR.
- 1178461 C. Gadd, RAFVR.
- 1257662 C. E. Gage, RAFVR.
- 1402744 P. J. Gammon, RAFVR.
- 577528 D. J. Garrod.
- 1056167 A. Gavin, RAFVR.
- 907653 L. R. Gear, RAFVR.
- 1291540 A. L. Gent, RAFVR.
- 964490 C. M. George, RAFVR.
- 1200760 A. J. J. R. Gibb, RAFVR.
- 1178227 A. J. Gibbons, RAFVR.
- 1488345 F. Gibson, RAFVR.
- 940126 T. A. Gibson, RAFVR.
- 1400782 P. Gigg, RAFVR.
- 930190 H. E. Gigney, RAFVR.
- 1437038 S. A. Gillinder, RAFVR.
- 1009873 W. A. Giltrap, RAFVR.
- 1005179 R. K. Gledhill, RAFVR.
- 994799 J. Goldie, RAFVR.
- 867750 J. F. Gordon, Auxiliary Air Force.
- 1031858 J. J. Gould, RAFVR.
- 1069107 E. S. Gourlay, RAFVR.
- 1421249 T. Graves, RAFVR.
- 1438805 L. S. Gray, RAFVR.
- 998131 J. Green, RAFVR.
- 1123071 T. R. Greener, RAFVR.
- 1084281 G. Griffin, RAFVR.
- 1081523 L. Griffith, RAFVR.
- 921387 E. Grose, RAFVR.
- 1298318 H. Hacking, RAFVR.
- 1049830 B. Haigh, RAFVR.
- 1013055 C. C. Hall, RAFVR.
- 616557 H. Hall.
- 542229 L. P. Hall.
- 911795 W. A. Hall, RAFVR.
- 807156 T. M. Hann, Auxiliary Air Force.
- 508145 R. S. B. Harlick.
- 1178953 E. G. Harrington, RAFVR
- 931406 A. W. Harris, RAFVR.
- 515788 F. J. Harris.
- 1281950 G. Harris, RAFVR.
- 1420939 R. F. Harris, RAFVR.
- 1033777 G. Harrison, RAFVR.
- 951989 R. Harrod, RAFVR.
- 1014530 K. Harston, RAFVR.
- 918883 D. E. Hartley, RAFVR.
- 635192 W. J. Harvey.
- 949860 E. Haslam, RAFVR.
- 1000109 W. F. Hasnip, RAFVR.
- 1264750 K. Hassall, RAFVR.
- 702591 A. R. S. Hastings, RAFVR.
- 1241808 R. J. Hatton, RAFVR.
- 1448014 H. L. Hawkes, RAFVR.
- 924739 E. F. Heard, RAFVR.
- 750960 E. J. Hemmingway, RAFVR.
- 575871 C. Henderson.
- 1070475 F. Herd, RAFVR.
- 999578 R. W. Hewett, RAFVR.
- 1101720 W. H. Hewitt, RAFVR.
- 643872 G. Hide.
- 637839 G. Higgs.
- 1195679 E. E. Highgate, RAFVR.
- 612034 A. Hill.
- 1241665 H. E. Hine, RAFVR.
- 777821 K. Hirsch, RAFVR.
- 904421 J. A. Hirst, RAFVR.
- 538489 F. Hockin.
- 1380417 F. J. Holder, RAFVR.
- 1061337 J. Holder, RAFVR.
- 1354889 R. V. Holder, RAFVR.
- 1621318 E. Holdsworth, RAFVR.
- 1063903 G. F. Holmes, RAFVR.
- 778137 F. H. Hosie, RAFVR.
- 1439736 J. L. Howes, RAFVR.
- 1243191 S. L. Hudson, RAFVR.
- 1175369 A. Huggins, RAFVR.
- 1175291 S. G. E. Humphries, RAFVR.
- 1442132 W. S. Hutchins, RAFVR.
- 1272001 E. F. Hyde, RAFVR.
- 1405673 J. M. Hyde, RAFVR.
- 1101336 G. F. Ibbotson, RAFVR.
- 989078 A. M. C. Inglis, RAFVR.
- 1251317 E. Ingram, RAFVR.
- 1139641 A. Isherwood, RAFVR.
- 635991 B. F. Jackson.
- 1497448 E. J. D. Jackson, RAFVR.
- 1042188 H. Jackson, RAFVR.
- 1011777 D. Jeens, RAFVR.
- 1162663 W. F. Johns, RAFVR.
- 935916 A. Johnson, RAFVR.
- 1369708 A. Johnson, RAFVR.
- 1189882 A. B. Johnson, RAFVR.
- 1059363 D. E. Johnson, RAFVR.
- 1378076 H. W. B. Johnson, RAFVR.
- 1310584 F. Johnson, RAFVR.
- 1392414 A. Jones, RAFVR.
- 1531839 E. S. Jones, RAFVR.
- 1170023 L. B. K. Jones, RAFVR.
- 629550 R. A. Jones.
- 1048510 S. Jones, RAFVR.
- 1255118 T. Jones, RAFVR.
- 541406 T. B. Jones.
- 1366112 V. Kask, RAFVR.
- 1374515 G. S. Kay, RAFVR.
- 538423 W. J. Kay.
- 535994 H. Kelly.
- 778045 L. C. Kelly, RAFVR.
- 777777 P. P. Kelly, RAFVR.
- 1188040 E. B. Kemp, RAFVR.
- 1225187 J. W. Kester, RAFVR.
- 911309 R. Kestila, RAFVR.
- 1200698 W. R. Keyser, RAFVR.
- 1208029 F. S. Kingdon, RAFVR.
- 1275065 J. P. Klinkenberg, RAFVR.
- 1110785 J. F. Knowles, RAFVR.
- 1256531 R. A. Knowles (deceased).
- 923054 D. A. Lacey, RAFVR.
- 774409 W. E. Lachs, RAFVR.
- 1369090 D. Laidlaw, RAFVR.
- 940738 J. H. Laight, RAFVR.
- 1429937 G. A. Lang, RAFVR.
- 629907 W. D. Laskey.
- 1180732 J. W. Laurence, RAFVR.
- 1174868 R. Lawrence, RAFVR.
- 955287 T. N. Lawson, RAFVR.
- 1034358 H. C. Ledbetter, RAFVR.
- 1482172 V. C. J. Leech, RAFVR.
- 965619 E. E. Letman, RAFVR.
- 972803 A. Lightfoot, RAFVR.
- 526688 E. R. Locking.
- 1308593 M. D. Lodwick, RAFVR.
- 1432507 P. F. J. Lorden, RAFVR.
- 972978 J. Lowe, RAFVR.
- 628776 G. H. Lumsdon.
- 1150158 F. G. McCavish, RAFVR.
- 969862 J. McCreath, RAFVR.
- 1004959 W. S. MacDonald, RAFVR.
- 913281 S. McEwan, RAFVR.
- 539358 J. P. McIlwee.
- 557724 R. T. McLaren, RAFVR.
- 1065671 D. McLeod, RAFVR.
- 1611418 E. A. McShee, RAFVR.
- 1302763 D. Macauley, RAFVR.
- 1012063 A. N. Mann, RAFVR.
- 926923 R. H. K. Manns, RAFVR.
- 1380515 F. R. Marsh, RAFVR.
- 998607 J. W. Marshall, RAFVR.
- 1097299 R. Marshall, RAFVR.
- 912168 D. S. Mecklenburgh, RAFVR.
- 977081 R. Meecham, RAFVR.
- 1026203 D. H. Meldrum, RAFVR.
- 1478294 A. Merrell, RAFVR.
- 963167 R. A. V. Merritt, RAFVR.
- 928028 W. H. Michael, RAFVR.
- 961583 C. W. G.Middleton, RAFVR.
- 1096282 A. Milburn, RAFVR.
- 953336 A. J. G. Mills, RAFVR.
- 1186930 L. F. Milker, RAFVR.
- 615954 J. T. Milward.
- 1129925 C. Mitchell, RAFVR.
- 549535 E. S. Mitchell.
- 334479 W. Mitchell.
- 1017498 W. Mitchell, RAFVR.
- 626297 W. W. Mitchell.
- 531969 F. MolyneuX.
- 1187119 D. B. Morgan, RAFVR.
- 1150820 K. H. Morgan, RAFVR.
- 1021985 T. E. Morgan, RAFVR.
- 1098420 T. S. Morgan, RAFVR.
- 1446532 W. G. Morgan, RAFVR.
- 1120019 A. Mottram, RAFVR.
- 1055417 W. P. Mount, RAFVR.
- 803483 R. C. Munro, Auxiliary Air Force.
- 1308237 R. Murfitt, RAFVR.
- 1011736 W. A. Murray, RAFVR.
- 1101759 R. C. Mutten, RAFVR.
- 976276 E. W. Naile, RAFVR.
- 777753 P. R. Needham, RAFVR.
- 1097157 R. Needham, RAFVR.
- 617341 H. G. Nettleton.
- 962448 L. E. Nibbs, RAFVR.
- 1538525 A. R. Nicholls, RAFVR.
- 908100 R. O. H. Nicholls, RAFVR.
- 965038 J. Nield, RAFVR.
- 1497500 C. Nightingale, RAFVR.
- 548477 J. Nimmo.
- 1384020 G. G. Nokes, RAFVR.
- 1172212 J. Nunn, RAFVR.
- 1403574 W. E. Ockelford, RAFVR.
- 538453 J. Ogilvie, RAFVR.
- 1194776 W. E. Orme, RAFVR.
- 1536161 D. R. Page, RAFVR.
- 1179868 W. Page, RAFVR.
- 1305074 J. W. Pagett, RAFVR.
- 1207949 H. E. Palmer, RAFVR.
- 354590 W. E. Papworth.
- 996985 H. Parker, RAFVR.
- 1006845 R. N. Parker, RAFVR.
- 1240822 L. Patheyjohns, RAFVR.
- 1047520 F. C. Patrick, RAFVR.
- 1372050 J. Patterson, RAFVR.
- 1073011 J. V. Pattison, RAFVR.
- 1099965 L. E. H. Payne, RAFVR.
- 1330089 W. E. Pearce, RAFVR.
- 1139911 J. L. Pearson, RAFVR.
- 1110370 R. E. Penn, RAFVR.
- 1017038 H. Pentland, RAFVR.
- 1030328 L. Perry, RAFVR.
- 1041406 M. Perry, RAFVR.
- 1219072 F. Pettit, RAFVR.
- 638695 R. E. Pettit.
- 1653333 S. J. Phillips, RAFVR.
- 1400725 T. A. Phillips, RAFVR.
- 1081451 F. Picksley, RAFVR.
- 1194770 W. S. Pile, RAFVR.
- 1292606 H. A. Plant, RAFVR.
- 640955 G. Pratt.
- 951854 C. F. Preston, RAFVR.
- 617381 B. Price.
- 1165310 E. S. G. Price, RAFVR.
- 944320 D. Prowse, RAFVR.
- 750036 J. T. Pugh, RAFVR.
- 777927 R. Quicke, RAFVR.
- 1006875 C. Rae, RAFVR.
- 1128112 F. R. Rastall, RAFVR.
- 1118644 J. O. Ratcliffe, RAFVR.
- 1008318 S. K. Ratcliffe, RAFVR.
- 1144660 V. Ratcliffe, RAFVR.
- 987780 A. Rawstron, RAFVR.
- 1061573 F. Reavley, RAFVR.
- 616870 D. C. Reddick.
- 1236888 H. G. Reeve, RAFVR.
- 645719 L. M. J. Reeve.
- 754409 S. R. Reeve, RAFVR.
- 1124695 M. Reid, RAFVR.
- 1270456 R, J. R. Reid, RAFVR.
- 701236 A. J. Reynolds, RAFVR.
- 1530405 E. J. Reynolds, RAFVR.
- 648031 R. Richards.
- 1400933 W. C. D. Richards, RAFVR.
- 1271826 G. H. D. Ridgley, RAFVR.
- 1183772 W. E. Riley, RAFVR.
- 1109159 A. T. Rimmer, RAFVR.
- 1261314 P. C. Rising, RAFVR.
- 1166854 D. C. Roberts, RAFVR.
- 1426166 E. Roberts, RAFVR.
- 1342072.A. H. Robertson, RAFVR.
- 949127 H. Robinson, RAFVR.
- 1067313 J. J. Robinson, RAFVR.
- 961895 J. L. Robinson, RAFVR.
- 1025388 J. S.Robinson, RAFVR.
- 1017262 R. Robinson, RAFVR.
- 940102 T. W. Robinson, RAFVR.
- 1114500 W. Robinson, RAFVR.
- 1037116 R. F. Robson, RAFVR.
- 1368608 W. C. Rodger, RAFVR.
- 1483532 A. Rodley, RAFVR.
- 756700 A. C. Rogers, RAFVR.
- 122238 A. Ross, RAFVR.
- 1385646 G. E. C. Ross, RAFVR.
- 1104536 R. Ross, RAFVR.
- 921328 G. E. Roughton, RAFVR.
- 921504 L. H. C. Rowland, RAFVR.
- 995395 E. Rowley, RAFVR.
- 749081 J. W. Ruffell, RAFVR.
- 1088589 W. A. Russell, RAFVR.
- 1154936 C. S. Ryan, RAFVR.
- 934375 R. G. Sadler, RAFVR.
- 1218511 P. Sale, RAFVR.
- 1186440 C. F. Salmon, RAFVR.
- 1274117 R. J. Salway, RAFVR.
- 1294864 H. L. E. Sansom, RAFVR.
- 627897 J. S. Sargent, RAFVR.
- 1143559 L. J. Sarginson, RAFVR.
- 1122123 H. M. Saunders, RAFVR.
- 539831 R. B. Schickle.
- 919344 G. H. Scott, RAFVR.
- 1222662 N. F. Scott, RAFVR.
- 1224222 F. W. Seager, RAFVR.
- 1092255 W. J. Searle, RAFVR.
- 973111 J. J. Sergison, RAFVR.
- 1280272 C. L. Sharp, RAFVR.
- 1204193 E. J. Sharp, RAFVR.
- 995173 H. Sharples, RAFVR.
- 1306923 H. E. R. Shatford, RAFVR.
- 1032736 H. Shaw, RAFVR.
- 1191126 F. W. Sheldon, RAFVR.
- 1059174 E. A. Sherwood, RAFVR.
- 1281071 B. Shipp, RAFVR.
- 901775 S. C. Short, RAFVR.
- 1278599 C. S. Shovell, RAFVR.
- 1281755 L. C. Sims, RAFVR.
- 1012053 T. Sims, RAFVR.
- 1044674 A. Simpson, RAFVR.
- 1063649 S. Simpson, RAFVR.
- 1192310 W. P. Skillington, RAFVR.
- 1087948 J. Skinner, RAFVR.
- 1018862 S. Slade, RAFVR.
- 621453 A. Smith.
- 1175534 E. F. Smith, RAFVR.
- 127319 E. G. Smith, RAFVR.
- 548362 F. H. Smith.
- 1182959 H. G. Smith, RAFVR.
- 1552371 J. Smith, RAFVR.
- 1365843 J. A. Smith, RAFVR.
- 935167 R. Smith, RAFVR.
- 1158884 R. J. D. Smith, RAFVR.
- 949812 R. T. Smith, RAFVR.
- 351924 W. G. Smith.
- 1037899 W. H. Smith, RAFVR.
- 1201176 W. R. Smith, RAFVR.
- 1182006 R. H. Speed, RAFVR.
- 993876 R. G. Speedy, RAFVR.
- 1686592 A. Spencer, RAFVR.
- 941195 E. Spencer, RAFVR.
- 1427735 G. J. Spiers, RAFVR.
- 1163421 R. F. Sprackman, RAFVR.
- 1144451 A. Sproul, RAFVR.
- 1016678 H. Stafford, RAFVR.
- 1261292 W. L. Stanbury, RAFVR.
- 927219 K. R. Stanton, RAFVR.
- 1370757 G. F. Stark, RAFVR.
- 1202018 A. A. Starmer, RAFVR.
- 1007281 W. A. Stephenson, RAFVR.
- 533210 T. G. Stimson.
- 1050613 P. V. W. Stockbridge, RAFVR.
- 974850 B. A. C. Stonell, RAFVR.
- 749469 G. M. Stott, RAFVR.
- 1185238 F. J. Streater, RAFVR.
- 612413 A. J. Stuart.
- 999478 J. C. Sturgeon, RAFVR.
- 1077383 J. Sutherland, RAFVR.
- 932637 A. G. Talbott, RAFVR.
- 1420060 A. H. J. Tassier, RAFVR.
- 902427 A. S. Taylor, RAFVR.
- 1068766 C. E. D. Taylor, RAFVR.
- 1161671 D. I. Taylor, RAFVR.
- 1150860 T. E. Taylor, RAFVR.
- 1287794 R. W. H. Taylor, RAFVR.
- 649790 T. M. Tear.
- 1344257 C. D. Thain, RAFVR.
- 1251492 E. H. Thomas, RAFVR.
- 1115294 G. J. Thomas, RAFVR.
- 1137255 T. G. Thomas, RAFVR.
- 943211 H. Thompson, RAFVR.
- 1431866 K. E. Toms, RAFVR.
- 1093574 F. H. Totman, RAFVR.
- 1036451 E. Townsend, RAFVR.
- 997252 E. Towse, RAFVR.
- 744735 W. H. Trainer, RAFVR.
- 1015891 S. I. J. Trebilcock, RAFVR.
- 1256926 A. R. Turk, RAFVR.
- 777901 D. H. Van Der Struys, RAFVR.
- 1476453 G. Varnham, RAFVR.
- 778158 J. D. Venables, RAFVR.
- 11459395. M. Vertigans, RAFVR.
- 1472292 A. J. Wakefield, RAFVR.
- 570600 T. H. Walker.
- 983013 L. N. Walker, RAFVR.
- 770985 J. Wall, RAFVR.
- 900385 K. J. Waller, RAFVR.
- 955432 P. Waterworth, RAFVR.
- 953591 J. F. Watson, RAFVR.
- 1175051 L. C. Watson, RAFVR.
- 1058254 T. W. Watson, RAFVR.
- 1098990 J. R. Weatherhead, RAFVR.
- 188349 W. T. H. Welling, RAFVR.
- 1261494 E. J. A. Wells, RAFVR.
- 1177931 F. C. Wellum, RAFVR.
- 629124 D. A. West.
- 1585674 D. W. West, RAFVR.
- 553502 V. West.
- 1026725 J. Weston, RAFVR.
- 950445 N. Weston, RAFVR.
- 1156053 C. F. Westwick, RAFVR.
- 1235407 E. J. Wheare, RAFVR.
- 1006739, G. W. White, RAFVR.
- 1459342 T. W. C. White, RAFVR.
- 610066 A. E. Wilde.
- 1502151 E. H. Willett, RAFVR.
- 1149700 S. W. Williams, RAFVR.
- 1165701 K. R. Wills, RAFVR.
- 1115593 C. W. Wilson, RAFVR.
- 1208401 E. A. D. Woodcock, RAFVR.
- 1531926 F. E. Woolstow, RAFVR.
- 540919 E. C. Worgan.
- 1428769 C. W. F. T. Wright, RAFVR.
- 1284206 F. G. Wright, RAFVR.
- 1151430 S. W. O. Wright, RAFVR.
- 1474456 D. W. Yardley, RAFVR.
- 1113674 V. Young, RAFVR.

Acting Corporals

- 1493272 N. Burdis, RAFVR.
- 953464 E. Cavanagh, RAFVR.
- 1439724 E. R. Churchman, RAFVR.
- 1500543 J. J. Colligan, RAFVR.
- 1298594 N. Farrant, RAFVR.
- 1634324 R. W. Finch, RAFVR.
- 1514205 P. E. Haines, RAFVR.
- 1191724 V. G. H. Hemus, RAFVR.
- 969405 J. A. Martin, RAFVR.
- 1053979 J. Paterson, RAFVR.
- 710016 C. H, Radford, RAFVR.
- 753291 D. J. G. Smart, RAFVR.
- 1247266 W. G. Wheeler, RAFVR.
- 858249 J. T. Wild, Auxiliary Air Force.
- 1223363 H. C. Wright, RAFVR.

Leading Aircraftmen

- 1545230 J. Ackroyd, RAFVR.
- 1136329 F. Adams, RAFVR.
- 1159568 H. J. Adams, RAFVR.
- 1568174 J. Adams, RAFVR.
- 1221858 A. W. Albans, RAFVR.
- 1693233 J. S. Alderson, RAFVR.
- 982132 R. Alderson, RAFVR.
- 1139751 N. Allen, RAFVR.
- 1528762 W. J. Allen, RAFVR.
- 1290669 R. J. Alway, RAFVR.
- 816189 D. Anderson, Auxiliary Air Force.
- 1345500 J. Anderson, RAFVR.
- 900310 R. J. Andrews, RAFVR.
- 1518206 D. F. Aldridge, RAFVR.
- 1870135 G. E. Anslow, RAFVR.
- 1470415 J. Archer, RAFVR.
- 1655295 H. T. Arnold, RAFVR.
- 1438100 H. H. Arrowsmith, RAFVR.
- 981712 E. Atherton, RAFVR.
- 1241272 G. W. Austin, RAFVR.
- 576867 E. J. Bagley.
- 1385819 J. Bainbridge, RAFVR.
- 1481045 E. F. G. Baker, RAFVR.
- 1301913 F. F. J. Baker, RAFVR.
- 1325016 G. T. Baldwin, RAFVR.
- 1483831 J. Bangham, RAFVR.
- 1303922 E. J. Barnes, RAFVR.
- 1124440 C. Barstow, RAFVR.
- 617059 H. Battye.
- 1107667 L. F. Baxter, RAFVR.
- 1031290 R. H. Beard, RAFVR.
- 1462733 J. Beddall, RAFVR.
- 1832228 H. Beetham, RAFVR.
- 1061178 C. H. Bell, RAFVR.
- 1205802 M. Bellamy, RAFVR.
- 942354 R. Binns, RAFVR.
- 645663 R. G. Blaikie.
- 1194969 C. Blamire, RAFVR.
- 1245448 C. Booth, RAFVR.
- 1037584 W. H. Brierly, RAFVR.
- 981041 V. C. Britten, RAFVR.
- 1260741 J. R. H. Broad, RAFVR.
- 576088 W. M. Brockie.
- 1249979 H. Brooks, RAFVR.
- 752400 F. Brooks, RAFVR.
- 1378777 J. W. Brooksbank, RAFVR.
- 1538149 R. F. Broome, RAFVR.
- 1033447 W. T. Broomhead, RAFVR.
- 1259627 A. E. Brown, RAFVR.
- 1479221 C. Brown, RAFVR.
- 964120 W. F. Brown, RAFVR.
- 1545140 R. Bruce, RAFVR.
- 944466 W. Bullivant, RAFVR.
- 1200270 N. F. Bunker, RAFVR.
- 1078389 J. W. Burden, RAFVR.
- 1485184 K. Burrell, RAFVR.
- 1166689 G. W. Butler, RAFVR.
- 1360425 W. Butlin, RAFVR.
- 1279083 N. D. Case, RAFVR.
- 1085771 S. Case, RAFVR.
- 1543926 E. M. Cairns, RAFVR.
- 1445769 W. G. H. Carter, RAFVR.
- 1175564 F. W. A. Chadney, RAFVR.
- 1070452 F. Chadwick, RAFVR.
- 1015989 W. J. Chamberlain, RAFVR.
- 1663743 E. L. Chapman, RAFVR.
- 1469243 F. G. Chase, RAFVR.
- 553804 G. W. H. Clapham.
- 1087950 G. E. Clarke, RAFVR.
- 1043776 G. S. Clarke, RAFVR.
- 1165967 T. E. Clarke, RAFVR.
- 1146673 E. Clough, RAFVR.
- 1053188 C. L. Coates, RAFVR.
- 1299638 E. A. Cochrane, RAFVR.
- 1433026 B. M. Cocks, RAFVR.
- 1286222 G. Collins, RAFVR.
- 1632300 S. Collins, RAFVR.
- 1378815 W. F. Conduit, RAFVR.
- 1537969 W. Cook, RAFVR.
- 646643 C. Cooper.
- 1087044 L. A. Copley, RAFVR.
- 1303364 T. S. Couper, RAFVR.
- 1816752 H. R. Cox, RAFVR.
- 1464054 J. W. Craig, RAFVR.
- 1272955 H. A. Crearley, RAFVR.
- 1332845 A. F. Crocker, RAFVR.
- 1094271 C. E. Cross, RAFVR.
- 1005453 W. Cruickshank, RAFVR.
- 1478474 T. Crutchley, RAFVR.
- 1172472 G. A. S. Currin, RAFVR.
- 1034380 F. I. Curtis, RAFVR.
- 1420841 P. M. Dartnall, RAFVR.
- 980808 G. H. Darwin, RAFVR.
- 1674461 T. Daniels, RAFVR.
- 964020 L. Davtes, RAFVR.
- 1038805 L. C. Davtes, RAFVR.
- 1128796 R. Davtes, RAFVR.
- 1449226 C. J. A. Dearlove, RAFVR.
- 1638643 W. F. Deneham, RAFVR.
- 1401029 E. C. Densley, RAFVR.
- 1230933 E. Derbyshire, RAFVR.
- 1340949 H. Devine, RAFVR.
- 1570014 G. M. Dewar, RAFVR.
- 1137534 T. H. Dixon, RAFVR.
- 1210742 G. R. Doel, RAFVR.
- 1653402 E. G. Dovey, RAFVR.
- 1417102 J. V. Downs, RAFVR.
- 1507410 B. Drape, RAFVR.
- 748155 P. Drasdo, RAFVR.
- 1564044 J. H. Drysdale, RAFVR.
- 848389 A. Dunkley, Auxiliary Air Force.
- 1503152 W. Dunn, RAFVR.
- 1234502 D. R. Easton, RAFVR.
- 1139812 H. Eden, RAFVR.
- 700900 R. C. Emerson, RAFVR.
- 1533193 R. Edmondson, RAFVR.
- 922407 S. G. Edmunds, RAFVR.
- 1420810 D. Evans, RAFVR.
- 1064326 W. D. Evans, RAFVR.
- 1381520 G. H. D. Edwards, RAFVR.
- 960488 H. E. Edwards, RAFVR.
- 1092250 L. Edwards, RAFVR.
- 1143152 L. P. Edwards, RAFVR.
- 1459450 W. Edwards, RAFVR.
- 635702 R. V. Faben.
- 156711 J. C. Ferguson.
- 1548815 K. Fish, RAFVR.
- 351564 G. C. Fisher.
- 961391 H. E. Fisher, RAFVR.
- 867014 R. Fitzgerald, Auxiliary Air Force.
- 534714 G. D. Foster.
- 1438375 H. R. C. Fowler, RAFVR.
- 1489066 H. France, RAFVR.
- 1154539 C. E. Fraser, RAFVR.
- 1373523 J. Freel, RAFVR.
- 1315278 E. H. Fricker, RAFVR.
- 1343524 W. Galbraith, RAFVR.
- 1277847 A. E. Gale, RAFVR.
- 117584 C. G. Gamble, RAFVR.
- 1227565 F. J. Gander-Miller, RAFVR.
- 1446057 F. T. Gant, RAFVR.
- 1414188 C. Gardner, RAFVR.
- 1612204 J. F. Garwood, RAFVR.
- 1095620 L. Gascoigne, RAFVR.
- 1158463 E. R. Gilbert, RAFVR.
- 903244 I. Gill, RAFVR.
- 1613200 I. D. Gladwin, RAFVR.
- 1343109 A. R. Glen, RAFVR.
- 1242536 R. Goodman, RAFVR.
- 1575565 G. R. Gout, RAFVR.
- 1311574 S. Gowrie, RAFVR.
- 1202265 G. Gowrley, RAFVR.
- 1223979 A. C. Grange, RAFVR.
- 1088278 R. G. Graham, RAFVR.
- 1155156 W. Grant, RAFVR.
- 1548401 E. W. Gray, RAFVR.
- 1283621 L. V. Green, RAFVR.
- 1120211 W. E. Green, RAFVR.
- 1660864 C. J. Griffiths, RAFVR.
- 1130628 E. Griffiths, RAFVR.
- 1013683 J. T. Griffiths, RAFVR.
- 1018188 W. L. Griffiths, RAFVR.
- 1109080 G. N. Haggie, RAFVR.
- 1529556 H. Haigh, RAFVR.
- 904504 J. W. Haley, RAFVR.
- 1182510 G. L. Hanton, RAFVR.
- 1536070 E. Harbin, RAFVR.
- 1098508 E. Hargreaves, RAFVR.
- 1243804 E. A. T. Harris, RAFVR.
- 951192 J. A. Harris, RAFVR.
- 1504694 A. Haslam, RAFVR.
- 1073914 F. W. Haughton, RAFVR.
- 1638429 W. C. Hayden, RAFVR.
- 1030333 F. Hemsley, RAFVR.
- 1052633 A. A. Heslop, RAFVR.
- 1183301 F. E. Higgins, RAFVR.
- 1380608 R. W. A. Hill, RAFVR.
- 1222484 T. S. Hoad, RAFVR.
- 1411508 R. C. Hobbs, RAFVR.
- 1532228 S. T. Hodgson, RAFVR.
- 1226065 S. Holt, RAFVR.
- 1464992 A. S. Holloway, RAFVR.
- 1447822 R. W. Houghton, RAFVR.
- 1502364 S. Houghton, RAFVR.
- 1144972 E. J. Howard, RAFVR.
- 1585461 D. L. Hoy, RAFVR.
- 1107111 E. Hoy, RAFVR.
- 1237305 D. G. Hudd, RAFVR.
- 1209631 C. J. Hughes, RAFVR.
- 1195655 C. W. Humphrey, RAFVR.
- 1241495 A. T. Hutchins, RAFVR.
- 1130160 N. J. E. Isaac, RAFVR.
- 1252174 L. C. Isitt, RAFVR.
- 983744 A. Izatt, RAFVR.
- 1499691 D. Jackson, RAFVR.
- 1288126 J. R. Jackson, RAFVR.
- 1106490 W. Jackson, RAFVR.
- 549898 G. F. Jacques.
- 1657172 E. C. Jeffery, RAFVR.
- 902061 R. H. Jelf, RAFVR.
- 1504971 K. B. Jennings, RAFVR.
- 945118 A. E. Jones, RAFVR.
- 1354830 E. Jones, RAFVR.
- 1151638 G. E. Jones, RAFVR.
- 1124928 S. G. Jones, RAFVR.
- 1531011 T. Jones, RAFVR.
- 1134102 T. G. Jones, RAFVR.
- 1072760 W. E. John, RAFVR.
- 1286611 R. C. Justice, RAFVR.
- 1619459 G. Kaye, RAFVR.
- 1060358 S. J. Keay, RAFVR.
- 1639905 H. G. King, RAFVR.
- 1197612 W. King, RAFVR.
- 1195437 E. C. Kinns, RAFVR.
- 546295 R. Knaggs.
- 1193016 C. J. Lakin, RAFVR.
- 1087804 H. Lane, RAFVR.
- 1314237 W. E. Langford, RAFVR.
- 1048390 C. W. Launchbury, RAFVR.
- 652733 R. C. Lawrence.
- 1331564 J. C. Leach, RAFVR.
- 1282966 G. W. Lee, RAFVR.
- 1613264 G. W. Lee, RAFVR.
- 1023547 H. Lee, RAFVR.
- 633004 E. C. Lennon.
- 1432643 D. G. Lever, RAFVR.
- 1065457 E. Lewis, RAFVR.
- 914400 T. G. Lewis, RAFVR.
- 1347613 T. Lindsay, RAFVR.
- 1170669 H. Lintott, RAFVR.
- 911192 A. J. Lloyd, RAFVR.
- 1281008 R. G. Lloyd, RAFVR.
- 1546966 E. W. Lovatt, RAFVR.
- 1264051 W. E. L. Lovatt, RAFVR.
- 1501856 D. H. N. Lush, RAFVR.
- 1063296 J. Lynch, RAFVR.
- 1115464 F. Maiden, RAFVR.
- 1556892 E. M. McCoy, RAFVR.
- 1370650 M. McDartlin, RAFVR.
- 1354720 W. McGowan, RAFVR.
- 1124330 A. R. MacLeod, RAFVR.
- 1573018 I. S. McLeod, RAFVR.
- 1012236 B. Mann, RAFVR.
- 1358542 T. Manning, RAFVR.
- 1264138 D. Marchant, RAFVR.
- 1451181 T. C. Mardling, RAFVR.
- 1213468 R. H. Markham, RAFVR.
- 1053983 S. Marshall, RAFVR.
- 1143157 T. W. Marshall, RAFVR.
- 1663359 F. H. Marston, RAFVR.
- 1711807 G. Masters, RAFVR.
- 1365944 A. G. Matheson, RAFVR.
- 1335427 J. T. A. Maybey, RAFVR.
- 1019256 W. Michie, RAFVR.
- 1063443 E. Middleton, RAFVR.
- 1372336 L. L. Middleton, RAFVR.
- 933950 A. Miller, RAFVR.
- 854104 A. Mills, Auxiliary Air Force.
- 998772 J. Mills, RAFVR.
- 1216441 C. Millward, RAFVR.
- 1226477 J. W. Milward, RAFVR.
- 1510968 J. M. Moorcroft, RAFVR.
- 1143174 F. A. Morley, RAFVR.
- 1161721 D. G. Morris, RAFVR.
- 1511741 J. W. Morris, RAFVR.
- 1276202 A. E. Morrish, RAFVR.
- 1096856 S. Mucklin, RAFVR.
- 1721769 U. J. Mumford, RAFVR.
- 1563599, W. F. Murray, RAFVR.
- 1206389 J. T. Musson, RAFVR.
- 1155348 J. G. S. Newcombe, RAFVR.
- 1112076 G. W. Nichol, RAFVR.
- 1407363 S. L. Nicholas, RAFVR.
- 981114 L. Nimmo, RAFVR.
- 1035275 J. Noble, RAFVR.
- 1465304 A. W. North, RAFVR.
- 1028623 R. B. Gates, RAFVR.
- 1093886 C. O'Donohue, RAFVR.
- 1575799 C. R. O'Grady, RAFVR.
- 1112072 J. B. Osborne, RAFVR.
- 1273165 D. A. Overton, RAFVR.
- 1474538 D. W. T. Oxtoby, RAFVR.
- 1045869 J. P. Page, RAFVR.
- 1474188 A. D. Panero, RAFVR.
- 1485586, K. A. Parker, RAFVR.
- 1403547 H. R. Parnell, RAFVR.
- 1481745 L. E. W. Parsons, RAFVR.
- 912457 E. G. Pasque, RAFVR.
- 1552241 J. P. Paterson, RAFVR.
- 1205570 J. H. Pearman, RAFVR.
- 1155562 R. F. Perfect, RAFVR.
- 1182307 N. Perkins, RAFVR.
- 1620170 S. E. V. Pescud, RAFVR.
- 1516040 J. A. Phillip, RAFVR.
- 538233 W. N. Phillips.
- 1348072 T. Pickering, RAFVR.
- 1287751 H. H. Pilcher, RAFVR.
- 1573865 G. Pirie, RAFVR.
- 1695187 B. Plant, RAFVR.
- 1484830 G. E. Platt, RAFVR.
- 1457926 N. R. Plowman, RAFVR.
- 1832442 W. G. H. Plummer, RAFVR.
- 1489573 K. Pocock, RAFVR.
- 974285 E. Pollard, RAFVR.
- 1525173 R. V. Porteous, RAFVR.
- 1224988 A. Price, RAFVR.
- 1243639 J. R. Price, RAFVR.
- 855783 L. J. Price, Auxiliary Air Force.
- 1281847 R. Price, RAFVR.
- 649650 L. E. Prisley.
- 3777585 T. Purves, RAFVR.
- 1463497 F. Pusey, RAFVR.
- 1115855 G. F. Rae, RAFVR.
- 1273318 E. A. Raine, RAFVR.
- 1050762 C. J. Rainford, RAFVR.
- 1182951 B. H. T. Redwood, RAFVR.
- 1201207 F. J. E. Renvoize, RAFVR.
- 1563935 R. S. Renwick, RAFVR.
- 1402689 T. L Reynolds, RAFVR.
- 1296699 W. J. Reynolds, RAFVR.
- 1216131 R. J. Rhodes, RAFVR.
- 1060817 W. Rice, RAFVR.
- 958867 E. E. Richards, RAFVR.
- 1171937 J. R. Richards, RAFVR.
- 1031607 R. M. Rickard, RAFVR.
- 1397966 S. Roe, RAFVR.
- 1279968 E. J. Roberts, RAFVR.
- 1105721 C. A. Robertson, RAFVR.
- 973794 H. Robertson, RAFVR.
- 1052865 G. B. Robinson, RAFVR.
- 1485520 L. Robinson, RAFVR.
- 1378311 H. Robson, RAFVR.
- 1145841 J. H. Rose, RAFVR.
- 1443106 R. E. Rose, RAFVR.
- 999439 H. N. Rostum, RAFVR.
- 1190640 A. G. Rowles, RAFVR.
- 1079397 S. A. Sadler, RAFVR.
- 1612272 W. Saile, RAFVR.
- 1331941 H. R. Salisbury, RAFVR.
- 1526822 R. A. Sanders, RAFVR.
- 1289364 F. W. Savidge, RAFVR.
- 613453 H. W. Scarisbrook.
- 1674052 G. Scofield, RAFVR.
- 962333 K. I. Shoular, RAFVR.
- 1163870 A. Sears, RAFVR.
- 775814 M. Shnejurson, RAFVR.
- 1440507 S. G. Sibley, RAFVR.
- 1493473 A. W. Sidey, RAFVR.
- 1176362 E. Simmons, RAFVR.
- 1050223 E. Simpson, RAFVR.
- 1227302 R. A. Sinclair, RAFVR.
- 1113220 A. E. Sinfield, RAFVR.
- 1235887 E. H. Skipworth, RAFVR.
- 1512390 H. Sleaford, RAFVR.
- 1554323 J. B. Slight, RAFVR.
- 1612176 K. S. Sline, RAFVR.
- 949892 A. Smith, RAFVR.
- 1408618 E. R. Smith, RAFVR.
- 1174763 F. C. Smith, RAFVR.
- 1175101 F. S. Smith, RAFVR.
- 1532566 H, Smith, RAFVR.
- 1197612 J. Smith, RAFVR.
- 1122404 S. Smith, RAFVR.
- 1099241 R. E. Spicer, RAFVR.
- 1493462 G. W. Sprawson, RAFVR.
- 1188615 A. E. Squire, RAFVR.
- 1166425 P. G. Squire, RAFVR.
- 1249025 C. H. Stanners, RAFVR.
- 956696 R. Statham, RAFVR.
- 1065554 G. E. Steed, RAFVR.
- 983559 G. Stevens, RAFVR.
- 1019671 J. J. D. Stevens, RAFVR.
- 1051376 W. St. Paul, RAFVR.
- 621034 W. S. Street.
- 1005021 G. E. Sutcliffe, RAFVR.
- 1264639 J. G. Sumner, RAFVR.
- 1502049 C. J. Swaffield, RAFVR.
- 1013151 T. F. Sweet, RAFVR.
- 1227515 J. Sword, RAFVR.
- 1124693 G. E. Talbot, RAFVR.
- 1158004 H. Taylor, RAFVR.
- 984493 P. G. Taylor, RAFVR.
- 150418 R. L. Taylor, RAFVR.
- 1164021 E. W. Thomas, RAFVR.
- 1418093 S. E. Thomas, RAFVR.
- 1175047 T. B. Thomas, RAFVR.
- 1541495 F. Thorp, RAFVR.
- 1496846 H. Tilling, RAFVR.
- 1282990 I. S. Treherne, RAFVR.
- 1486910 J. H. Trotter, RAFVR.
- 1405762 G. S. Truman, RAFVR.
- 1195137 R. T. Truman, RAFVR.
- 1084216 W. Tunna, RAFVR.
- 1207975 A. C. Turner, RAFVR.
- 944217 R. P. B. Udall, RAFVR.
- 746436 D. Vaughan, RAFVR.
- 1201471 A. D. B. Waddie, RAFVR.
- 1507555 J. G. Walker, RAFVR.
- 1634504 V. G. Walker, RAFVR.
- 1261519 C. H. Ward, RAFVR.
- 1291276 F. Ward, RAFVR.
- 1475238 P. Waring, RAFVR.
- 1404004 G. C. Warren, RAFVR.
- 1629482 R. S. Watkins, RAFVR.
- 1178540 J. H. Watson, RAFVR.
- 1060124 H. W. Watson, RAFVR.
- 1484405 J. W. Webster, RAFVR.
- 944265 R. Webster, RAFVR.
- 1371140 G. A. Weddell, RAFVR.
- 552296 C. E. Wedgewood.
- 916612 A. C. Wellstood, RAFVR.
- 1101272 R. Welsh, RAFVR.
- 1192535 E. West, RAFVR.
- 964564 H. G. West, RAFVR.
- 1166989 C. Westbrook, RAFVR.
- 1007497 F. Westhead, RAFVR.
- 1236876 E. C. Wheeler, RAFVR.
- 1270018 J. S. Whiting, RAFVR.
- 1099759 L. E. White, RAFVR.
- 1224460 V. R. Willey, RAFVR.
- 1296238 A. A. Williams, RAFVR.
- 1659566 D. R. H. Williams, RAFVR.
- 1424331 G. H. Williams, RAFVR.
- 1379545 L. Williams, RAFVR.
- 1353562 L. J. Williams, RAFVR.
- 1727080 G. H. Willis, RAFVR.
- 951605 C. Wilson, RAFVR.
- 1307059 P. J. W. Winslow, RAFVR.
- 1534448 J. E. Wood, RAFVR.
- 1092686 C. F. Woodward, RAFVR.
- 1152231 J. C. Woodward, RAFVR.
- 1473164 S. C. Woolmer, RAFVR.
- 1090280 D. J. Worrall, RAFVR.
- 1464795 F. C. E. Wright, RAFVR.
- 1092585 T. W. Wrightson, RAFVR.
- 1511415 C. L. Wyatt, RAFVR.
- 1147415 C. P. Wyles, RAFVR.
- 1554693 R. Wylie, RAFVR.
- 1480529 R. D. J. Wythes, RAFVR.
- 1616227 K. B. Yates, RAFVR.
- 1466151 J. Yearley, RAFVR.
- 1172208 C. J. W. Young, RAFVR.

Aircraftmen 1st Class

- 1142054 S. A. Alletson, RAFVR.
- 1113742 G. A. Amy, RAFVR.
- 1191859 T. F. Bamkin (deceased), RAFVR.
- 1535684 R. Banks, RAFVR.
- 1546992 T. D. Barron, RAFVR.
- 1514669 W. H. Bathurst, RAFVR.
- 1442140 C. A. Beauchamp, RAFVR.
- 1519189 C. Bennett, RAFVR.
- 1501890 G. W. S. Billington, RAFVR.
- 1610238 V. W. J. Blake, RAFVR.
- 1095124 A. Bradshaw, RAFVR.
- 1020037 E. J. Britten, RAFVR.
- 1553766 J. Burnie, RAFVR.
- 1560530 V. Burton, RAFVR.
- 1689877 J. W. Butterworth, RAFVR.
- 1336210 G. P. Caley, RAFVR.
- 1578007 E. L. Cartwright, RAFVR.
- 1408848 P. R. Chappell, RAFVR.
- 1654901 R. I. Clayton, RAFVR.
- 1547836 A. Cooper, RAFVR.
- 1247572 P. J. W. Cooper, RAFVR.
- 563717 G. Darling, RAFVR.
- 1209303 W J. Davies, RAFVR.
- 1468083 G. A. Drummond, RAFVR.
- 1237500 N. J. Ellington, RAFVR.
- 1695086 L. Etherington, RAFVR.
- 1441032 J. Fennymore, RAFVR.
- 1407008 E. G. French, RAFVR.
- 1440211 A. C. M. Froud, RAFVR.
- 1508917 O. Gardner, RAFVR.
- 1286378 L. W. Gibbins, RAFVR.
- 984024 R. Graham, RAFVR.
- 1344955 J. Grant, RAFVR.
- 1277167 R. Griffiths, RAFVR.
- 1694371 L. Gunning, RAFVR.
- 1201818 B. A. E. Hall, RAFVR.
- 1628095 C. J. Heasman, RAFVR.
- 1402148 J. Hill, RAFVR.
- 1647787 R. A. Hill, RAFVR.
- 1486107 S. Hobbins, RAFVR.
- 1711767 L. F. Holmes, RAFVR.
- 1038570 W. E. J. Hudson, RAFVR.
- 1275001 E. Hunter, RAFVR.
- 1174363 R. W. Isaac, RAFVR.
- 1025258 K. J. Jackson, RAFVR.
- 1229356 R. Jewell, RAFVR.
- 1314814 L. Lammiman, RAFVR.
- 1453028 G. McDonald, RAFVR.
- 119231 G. McMahon, RAFVR.
- 778146 S. A. MacMaster, RAFVR.
- 1537277 R. H. Mellor, RAFVR.
- 1668557 V. A. Mikkelson, RAFVR.
- 1190628 C. T. Moore, RAFVR.
- 1118536 J. C. Mowat, RAFVR.
- 1690965 E. Oliver, RAFVR.
- 1158709 G. B. Oliver, RAFVR.
- 1461654 F. H. Philpot, RAFVR.
- 1472254 S. Range, RAFVR.
- 1036589 T. Rogan, RAFVR.
- 1207049 D. J. Ryder, RAFVR.
- 1226734 G. L. Salter, RAFVR.
- 1553506 J. P. Samson, RAFVR.
- 1835910 A. Starforth, RAFVR.
- 1460605 H. E. Sturgeon, RAFVR.
- 1465376 H. J. Thomas, RAFVR.
- 1034233 E. Thompson, RAFVR.
- 1630036 S. F. Thraves, RAFVR.
- 1113617 G. E. Tindall, RAFVR.
- 1408834 T. Verrinder, RAFVR.
- 1654618 K. E. Waite, RAFVR.
- 1096786 W. P. Walden, RAFVR.
- 1643900 D. E. Ward, RAFVR.
- 1025409 H. Wharton, RAFVR.
- 1447101 L. Whitehouse, RAFVR.
- 1340959 J. McD. Wilson, RAFVR.

Aircraftmen 2nd Class

- 1563864 A. Baird, RAFVR.
- 1274484 A. G. S. Beare, RAFVR.
- 1666636 L. G. Bishop, RAFVR.
- 1697264 H. Cotton, RAFVR.
- 1236202 A. E. F. Dudley, RAFVR.
- 2210399 J. J. P. Durkin, RAFVR.
- 1317756 E. G. M. Ellis, RAFVR.
- 1493872 T. Hilton, RAFVR.
- 1342254 R. Laurie, RAFVR.
- 1021144 W. T. Norman, RAFVR.
- 2208423 J. Parker, RAFVR.
- 1629698 J. Pooley, RAFVR.
- 1564030 J. Russell, RAFVR.
- 1642335 J. Wilson, RAFVR.
- 1824773 G. Winders, RAFVR.

Princess Mary's Royal Air Force Nursing Service
Acting Senior Sister

- K. D. Johnson (5052).

Sisters

- J. Barber (5242).
- D. M. Lawson (5654).

Women's Auxiliary Air Force
Group Officer

- M. L. Crowther, OBE

Acting Wing Officers

- M. C. Loftus (229).
- F. A. J. Wreford (549).

Squadron Officers

- M. J. G. Buchanan (268).
- J. M. Entwisle (316).

Acting Squadron Officer

- L. H. Rankin (563).

Flight Officers

- M. E. U. Allen (346).
- M. I. Cooper (1519).
- C. A. Debenham (981).
- Lady E. Freeman (5928).
- K. M. L. Glennie (1602).
- P. M. Hanford (1490).
- E. F. Harker (179).
- J. L. M. Henderson (526).
- A. McW. McCurrach (1493).
- F. M. Newman (261).
- L. E. Nicolson (1069).
- M. A. Richmond (2316).
- A. M. Shepherd (1556).
- P. E. Stephenson (4475).
- B. M. Thomson (986).
- L. A. Wilson (491).

Acting Flight Officers

- J. C. Alldis (1901).
- D. Bevan (3157).
- G. E. Emmerson (2908).
- J. C. Gallante (2991).
- M. N. A. K. Hooper (6151).
- P. A. Hugill (619).
- C. Jones (2082).
- B. M. Lucas (2555).
- D. D. Paton (2176).
- F. R. Pentland (2805).
- D. J. N. Percy (2781).
- J. M. C. Pusinelli (1966).
- E. A. C. Robson (2283).

Section Officers

- E. M. Ainslie (4409).
- D. E. Attridge (5482).
- D. Aye-Moung (6520).
- E. L. Barsham (5188).
- M. C. Baum (4411).
- A. V. Bennett (4027).
- B. W. Bird (6401).
- J. M. Brotherton (2911).
- W. D. Buckley (4904).
- D. P. Dey (4033).
- M. P. Downes (2404).
- S. M. S. Elvins (4766).
- L. M. Fenn (4657).
- P. Fraser (3444).
- B. Garrow (5791).
- F. Gillespie (6545).
- F. M. Goddard (6474).
- J. B. A. Gow (4042).
- A. N. Grant (657).
- E. Hare (1326).
- E. W. Harris (3584).
- M. E. Hart (3857).
- K. E. Hayward (4494).
- J. Hewett (2369).
- M. A. Loud (3452).
- P. Lyons-Montgomery (3033).
- M. E. McKie (2221).
- F. M. C. Maxfield (5069).
- P. B. Millar (5148).
- E. M. O'Shaughnessy (5246).
- D. K. Powlett (5749).
- J. W. Sharp (5811).
- H. K. M. J. Smith (3601).
- M. Thomas (4882).
- I. M. Till (6091).
- B. D. Toule (3834).
- P. E. Twells (4099).
- G. M. Vaughan (4548).
- P. L. G. Wait (1271).
- M. M. Wheelhouse (3333).
- E. A. Wilson (610).

Assistant Section Officer

- O. M. King (7389).

Warrant Officers

- F. A. B. Bishop (890250).
- B. V. Collins (890499).
- D. M. Mackenzie (880466).
- J. O'Dowd (887693).

Flight Sergeants

- 893952 J. Baker.
- 893653 D. Blundy.
- 887704 L. B. Bonsor.
- 889516 N. I. Dixon.
- 890690 E. Emeny.
- 886275 C. M. Lanham.
- 881746 M. E. Lewis.
- 884885 N. Marsh.
- 887360 M. M. Murch.
- 886812 H. K. Nicholson.
- 893754 B. A. Weaver.

Sergeants

- 895405 G. E. Applebee.
- 439300 R. Atkins.
- 440402 L. W. M. Baldwin.
- 2040185 C. B. Ballantyne.
- 896515 C. E. E. Bell.
- 447023 E. M. Berryman.
- 427000 G. A. H. Buckman.
- 891945 L. C. Chamberlain.
- 424763 A. J. Channing.
- 423680 D. Clay.
- 889608 P. E. A. Clay.
- 2050367 W. K. Cockcroft.
- 421519 G. Copas.
- 427874 M. H. Danby.
- 880676 S. M. Dawson.
- 883640 M. D. Easson.
- 437608 J. Ellis.
- 447415 V. A. Fox.
- 2049194 W. M. Gummersall.
- 2000674 P. Haining.
- 442321 E. Harrison.
- 891802 M. F. M. Harrison.
- 420536 B. Jones.
- 892056 B. L. Kelley.
- 895112 L. Leake.
- 883294 S. M. Leonard.
- 894424 D. Lodge.
- 2083574 B. Molyneux.
- 896833 N. A. North.
- 423151 M. E. Oliver.
- 889935 J. M. Owen.
- 421168 A. A. Raffan.
- 421176, E. D. Rogers.
- 892622 F. M. Royffe.
- 446034 D. G. Shute.
- 447573 L. Smith.
- 443001 O. A. Sowden.
- 440302 I. A. Sparkes.
- 423123 J. Stringer.
- 428653 C. B. M. Thompson.
- 420478 D. M. Toas.
- 424682 C. M. Wahlstrand.

Acting Sergeant

- 449528 J. K. Parfitt.

Corporals

- 2091746 P. Allan.
- 2141350 B. Arkell.
- 434010 O. G. Armstrong.
- 425947 D. E. Arnold.
- 887261 M. I. Baldwin.
- 2060774 J. Beardsley.
- 420931 J. Bodsworth.
- 2006055 K. N. L Boxall.
- 2047780 J. L. H. Boyd.
- 2001494 L. Clabburn.
- 428742 R. O. Clarke.
- 2052249 D. E. Coopland.
- 892369 H. C. Corey.
- 2021930 M. M. Craker.
- 2056288 D. A. Crawford.
- 423741 M. J. Davies.
- 890315 M. D. De Glanville.
- 2013480 J. J. Disney.
- 2081708 H. E. Dobson.
- 2002937 S. Donnelly.
- 422681 M. W. Du Vergier.
- 462595 E. Earnshaw.
- 2043442 H. J. Elgin.
- 2049056 J. M. Farrow.
- 2005304 V. J. Felton.
- 422972 E. G. Ford.
- 434404 M. A. Foster.
- 2098584 E. M. Fowler.
- 452901 G. A. Gauzey.
- 894162 B. J. G. Gibbons.
- 2026046 A. M. Gibson.
- 433662 I. M. Gilmour.
- 2000232 I. A. Green.
- 430748 J. M. Greenwood.
- 448058 G. C. B. Groves.
- 436970 D. A. Hardy.
- 2001395 K. J. Harris.
- 2055579 P. Heard.
- 2038122 E. S. Henderson.
- 2000553 G. N. Hern.
- 2096282 M. Hetherington.
- 2091312 D. Hobson.
- 894015 L. Howarth.
- 432443 M. W. Hoye.
- 2028430 M. A. Husband.
- 2021851 D. E. Inggall.
- 2089802 C. F. Iveson.
- 2065124 M. James.
- 443453 I. O. M. Johnson.
- 2079104 G. H. Jones.
- 2070640 B. V. Kay.
- 2005329 E. B. Kemp.
- 445821 J. Kenna.
- 897112 E. L. King.
- 2068413 P. M. Knights.
- 460076 C. M. Latter.
- 443637 V. M. Lear.
- 431992 A. M. McPhail.
- 2102679 L. D. May.
- 2009654 E. G. Mowberry.
- 2097036 J. Mulholland.
- 423672 B. Parkin.
- 443013 E. W. Pettit.
- 444634 M. A. Phillips.
- 2053028 P. M. Price.
- 424748 A. E. Prior.
- 450295 M. O. Quinnell.
- 2023318 E. Rickman.
- 2062193 J. H. Roberts.
- 420551 M. Sedgwick.
- 460312 M. Shaw.
- 451151 D. B. Simmqnds.
- 2003523 B. C. Skelt.
- 450916 B. C. Sleath.
- 2044103 M. H. Smart.
- 2016838 R. I. A. M. Smith.
- 2068611 A. J. Somerset.
- 2002474 F. M. Stewart.
- 433248 A. E. Stoddart.
- 20612911. M. Straw.
- 2042025 N. Swanson.
- 446137 G. M. Thomas.
- 443675 E. Vaughan.
- 2002770 D. J. Wallis.
- 887426 J. J. Waters.
- 882666 M. W. Whitelaw.
- 432334 S. T. T. Winter.
- 435554 A. R. Worthy.
- 2087140 J. M. Wright.
- 2036242 M. S. Wydell.

Acting Corporal

- 449060 B. S. Martin.

Leading Aircraftwomen

- 2130157 R. A. Abrahams.
- 2068558 W. E. Allen.
- 2041563 M. T. Alston.
- 2044911 A. Anderson.
- 2021925 C. E. Ansell.
- 431611 K. L. Baggaley.
- 2011109 F. A. Baker.
- 2059927 M. D. Baker.
- 2074986 H. McD. Baxter.
- 473648 D. Bilton.
- 2078038 B. Boone.
- 2010763 M. J. Botwright.
- 2054881 M. Bown.
- 2013171 E. M. Bracey.
- 2005821 B. Bromhead.
- 442977 E. F. Brooker.
- 2064079 B. Buck.
- 2002626 G. M. A. Bury.
- 442023 P. Butt.
- 435518 K. M. Cheney.
- 460975 M. Churchward.
- 2087330 H. Clarke.
- 445433 K. M. Clarke.
- 2010362 G. E. Coakley.
- 2081151 W. Collins.
- 2082542 E. Cosgrove.
- 435630 J. Cousins.
- 2017246 M. Cracknell.
- 2073670 C. M. Davies.
- 2075988 J. M. Davison.
- 470653 I. Dyson.
- 2085253 M. J. Edge.
- 474650 A. J. Enstice.
- 2007651 R. M. Evans.
- 428832 P. A. Fenwick.
- 2044769 H. D. M. Forbes.
- 2097820 E. Forsyth.
- 431190 A. Gartland.
- 2045602 M. B. Gordon.
- 2038843 J. Grindell.
- 2008195 M. Gunston.
- 449374 J. E. Hancock.
- 2096003 J. Harvey.
- 2049156 W. Heald.
- 462052 E. Hibbert.
- 449484 J. T. Holmes.
- 477171 C. W. Holt.
- 2081414 M. E. Huband.
- 460050 M. Isbill.
- 429759 E. G. James.
- 2050867 A. B. Jowett.
- 2135503 C. B. Joy.
- 2058979 J. E. Knaggs.
- 2015922 B. N. Knight.
- 471384 S. M. Lamford.
- 2060905 M. Lawrence.
- 2064107 J. L. Lee.
- 2000165 S. A. Lee.
- 2066253 M. L. Lethbridge.
- 2033603 J. C. Lindus.
- 2105503 M. T. Lofthouse.
- 2000149 N. G. C. Major.
- 2034871 O. Manning.
- 2137802 M. D. Martin.
- 2088485 M. Mason.
- 2056502 M. Morgan.
- 2001118 I. G. Palmer.
- 2055769 V. Peacock.
- 2039145 J. Percival.
- 2007701 J. M. Pinner.
- 2021989 F. P. M. Reay.
- 2093119 N. Reay.
- 2002627 S. Record.
- 2091069 A. Richardson.
- 2025020 P. Richmond.
- 2031431 D. B. Ridge.
- 2054290 M. Roads.
- 454702 E. A. Rowlands.
- 474811 C. H. Shipley.
- 428424 P. F. Simpson.
- 437637 M. A. Steel.
- 20000311. M. Taylor.
- 458286 D. E. Thacker.
- 885845 N. M. Theis.
- 462647 J. C. Thomas.
- 2064771 D. M. Uff.
- 437334 C. I. Wallis.
- 2067651 D. M. Warring.
- 2093803 E. M. Wells.
- 2084153 J. E. Whitfield.
- 2014232 A. M. Willis.
- 2045605 M. Wilson.
- 442295 M. E. Witcomb.

Aircraftwomen 1st Class

- 459275 J. M. R. Body.
- 2011262 M. Brown.
- 2037732 L. B. Clark.
- 478060 E. Davey.
- 2076386 E. A. Davies.
- 2087405 C. Dougherty.
- 2033145 D. Fuller.
- 2092405 A. Hood.
- 2127027 F. R. Lambert.
- 2025253 E. P. Nicholl.
- 2035191 D. A. M. Rushmer.
- 461819 M. Sanderson.
- 2137871 J. I. Saynor.
- 2111284 K. Smith.
- 461053 E. D. Young.

Aircraftwomen 2nd Class

- 2141198 L. L. Bass.
- 487985 H. A. B. Blake.
- 2080482 E. M. Harrison.
- 2044113 L. Johnson.
- 2141505 I. M. Justice.
- 485199 A. E. Gates.
- 478038 J. C. Palmer.
- 2057825 E. Wilson.

Royal Navy
Lieutenants

- P. Dallas-Smith.
- G. W. Styles, DSC.

Chief Petty Officer

- PJ16259 E. J. Gray.

Royal Australian Air Force
Air Commodore

- F. M. Bladin, CBE.

Group Captain

- J. Alexander, OBE.

Wing Commander

- R. Holmes (Aus.406356).

Squadron Leader

- C. G. Stebbing (Aus.407880).

Acting Squadron Leaders

- R. D. J. Baird (Aus.405119).
- J. Catanach, DFC, (Aus.400364) (deceased).
- J. Clark (Aus.402439).
- F. M. Critchley, DFC, (Aus.404574).
- W. F. Diddams (Aus.400529).
- W. H. Fishburn (Aus.15673).
- R. G. Foskett (Aus.402652).
- E. A. Hudson, DFC, (Aus.404506).
- L. V. Hudson (Aus.400448).
- A. Wharton, DFC, (Aus.404556).

Flight Lieutenants

- G. L. Barnard (Aus.263132).
- C. Carmichael (Aus.403024).
- G. R. Champion (Aus.14965).
- R. C. Chessell (Aus.292254).
- C. D. Colling (Aus.263359).
- B. G. Eddell (Aus.267446).
- B. C. W. Fogg (Aus.405271).
- R. de V. Gipps (Aus.405404).
- G. R. Henderson (Aus.400798).
- R. V. Kierath (Aus.402364) (deceased).
- D. R. Law (Aus.403140).
- B. J. McSharry (Aus.404710).
- R. M. Mitchell (Aus.407092).
- G. Roberts (Aus.3189).
- J. D. Robertshaw (Aus.402399).
- H. Spencer (Aus.3396).
- W. J. Storey, DFC, (Aus.400508).
- R. L. C. Stuart (Aus.401197).
- G. O. Watson (Aus.406745).
- J. G. P. Weatherlake (Aus.404944).
- E. J. Woosley (Aus.404127).

Acting Flight Lieutenants

- L. C. Deignan (Aus.404808).
- C. T. Harper (Aus.416959).
- S. B. Harry (Aus.287412).
- R. C. W. Humble (Aus.416441).
- L. E. Short, DFC, (Aus.403382).

Flying Officers

- C. J. Bastian (Aus.404475).
- A. P. Bowman (Aus.40488).
- A. E. Gaze (Aus.410480).
- D. E. Griffiths (Aus.401945).
- A. A. Heslop (Aus.9226).
- H. T. Kennedy (Aus.422573).
- V. A. Lancaster (Aus.409149).
- J. R. Linton (Aus.421739).
- J. E. Sheehan (Aus.2332).
- R. B. Tuff (Aus.409257) (deceased).

Pilot Officers

- E. T. Hall (Aus.406976).
- H. G. Hardy (Aus.407506).
- P. J. Hedderwick (Aus.401950).
- F. V. Murphy (Aus.411075).
- J. Quirk (Aus.400124).

Warrant Officers

- E. G. Connor (Aus.412609).
- T. P. Druhan (Aus.403455).
- A. H. Hake (Aus.403218) (deceased).
- I. C. Jones (Aus.401696).
- T. G. Perry (Aus.407739).
- R. W. Raebel (Aus.5140).
- C. W. Richards (Aus.402296).
- D. C. Sidney (Aus.402617).
- A. L. White (Aus.407265).

Acting Warrant Officer

- J. A. Lenney (Aus.14297).

Flight Sergeants

- Aus.16990 F. G. Collins.
- Aus.425625 R. R. Eadie.
- Aus.22182 R. A. Everest.
- Aus.300377 M. W. D. Firth.
- Aus.425636 R. W. George.
- Aus.3510 W. B. Granger.
- Aus.4822 R. G. Moore.
- Aus.411256 G. A. Pratt.
- Aus.5737 C. C. B. Renshaw.
- Aus.413428 R. Richards.
- Aus.420597 A. J. Robertson.
- Aus.8251 J. McI. Saunders.
- Aus.9399 H. Tickle.
- Aus.8117 F. H. Wood.

Sergeants

- Aus.26471 I. A. Adams.
- Aus.10723 R. C. Archer.
- Aus.15069 H. Blundell.
- Aus.16657 M. A. Cahill.
- Aus.24099 H. W. Campbell.
- Aus.3760 R. H. Castleton.
- Aus.21241 B. R. Dalby.
- Aus.25130 H. E. Eastgate.
- Aus.21183 J. F. Fussell.
- Aus.22736 F. Gilmore.
- Aus.6727 C. E. Hall.
- Aus.32976 L. J. Henry.
- Aus.19081 J. P. Lynch.
- Aus.10665 A. J. Morris.
- Aus.16648 F. S. Pearce.
- Aus.27949 J. H. Pile
- Aus.9417 R. Tier.
- Aus.15781 W. J. Watts.
- Aus.12176 T. G. Wilbraham.
- Aus.408548 J. Wood.
- Aus.405001 M. J. Wyllie (deceased).
- Aus.9301 I. M. Yeates.

Acting Sergeant

- Aus.22695 L. R. Mcpherson.

Corporals

- Aus.3296 A. K. Dadd.
- Aus.22525 J. H. Foster.
- Aus.8731 F. Skillington.
- Aus.11452 W. W. Stark.
- Aus.14799 A. E. Tilso.
- Aus.15179 G. A. Warnes.

Aircraftman 1st Class

- Aus.44671 F. M. Franklin.

Royal Canadian Air Force
Air Commodore

- C. M. K. McEwen, MC, DFC.

Acting Air Commodore

- B. F. Johnson.

Group Captain

- M. Costello.

Acting Group Captains

- D. A. R. Bradshaw, DFC.
- H. M. Carscallen, DFC.
- R. C. Gordon.
- W. A. Jones.
- E. H. G. Moncrieff, AFC.
- G. E. M. Scott.
- D. M. Smith.

Acting Wing Commanders

- M. Brown (Can/C.1267).
- C. W. Palmer, DFC, (Can/J.15818).
- J. W. Reid (Can/C.927).
- C. G. Ruttan (Can/C.871).
- C. C. Sparling (Can/C.1957).
- J. W. Whyte (Can/C.4079).

Acting Squadron Leaders

- K. B. Andras (Can/C.6511).
- F. G. Botsford (Can/C.7878).
- A. H. C. Bruce (Can/C.7262).
- D. D. Carr-Harris (Can/C.2356).
- H. C. Givins (Can/C.4379).
- W. R. F. Grierson-Jackson, DFC, (Can/J.5683).
- A. D. Hamilton (Can/C.4990).
- G. F. Jenkins (Can/C.2189).
- T. M. Jones (Can/J.15168).
- R. J. Leaman (Can/C.2722).
- W. J. C. MacArthur (Can/C.5466).
- W. N. F. McLean (Can/C.3228).
- W. L. Marshall (Can/C.3373).
- D. G. Miller (Can/C.6628).
- R. F. Miller (Can/J.15481).
- J. Pennington (Can/J.8600).
- L. J. White (Can/J.5993).

Flight Lieutenants

- G. C. Beacock (Can/C.11994).
- H. Birkland (Can/5.5233) (deceased).
- W. N. Gibbens (Can/C.3552).
- F. W. Hallwood (Can/J.8755).
- C. A. Holmquist (Can./C.3404).
- G. A. Kidder (Can/J.10177) (deceased).
- P. W. Langford (Can/C.1631) (deceased).
- G. E. McGill (Can/J.5312) (deceased).
- N. V. St. C. Martin (Can/J.9514).
- W. F. Miles (Can/J.4153).
- J. H. R. Reginbal (Can/J.10149).
- H. A. Stackhouse (Can/J.9414).
- L. G. Virr (Can/C.987).
- J. C. Wernham (Can/J.6144) (deceased).
- G. W. Wiley (Can/J.7234) (deceased).
- A. Wilson (Can/5.7524).

Acting Flight Lieutenants

- A. B. Carveth (Can/C.11734).
- C. A. E. Danis (Can/C.8446).
- T. K. Draimin (Can/C.16015).
- J. P. A. Faguy (Can/J.15381).
- J. A. Irwin (Can/C.7490).
- R. J. Jones (Can/J.11550).
- W. A. Jones (Can/J.9851).
- L. A. Justason (Can/C.8738).
- P. G. F. Money (Can/C.9837).
- M. A. Mussell (Can/J.9661).
- W. J. Osborne (Can/C.7962).
- A. R. H. Riley (Can/C.7717).
- W. Seller (Can/C.7407).
- P. E. Spence (Can/J.16535).
- E. J. Strathdee (Can/C.9292).
- W. S. Thomson (Can/C.9378).
- H. J. Walker (Can/C.9222).
- E. H. M. Walsh (Can/J.s088).

Flying Officers

- P. M. Anderson, DFC, (Can/J.16379).
- D. C. Appleton (Can/J.18563).
- T. E. Bach (Can/J.22560).
- N. Brown (Can/J.16839).
- G. A. M. Bryenton (Can/J.16522).
- J. S. Clifford (Can/J.17312).
- C. H. E. Cook (Can/J.16670).
- J. F. Evans (Can/C.10936).
- H. Forrest (Can/J.16900).
- G. R. Harris (Can/J.14193).
- M. Harrison (Can/C.20089).
- R. W. Holman (Can/J.18836).
- N. S. B. Hull (Can/J.15753).
- H. E. Jackson (Can/J.16977).
- R. J. Leet (Can/J.16962).
- J. W. R. Macfarlane (Can/J.16752).
- P. A. Oleskevis (Can/C.16028).
- G. Ovens (Can/J.15676).
- W. M. Roberts (Can/J.17046).
- R. R. Ross (Can/J.10006).
- H. A. Schartz (Can/C.13308).
- S. G. Sherman (Can/J.17360).
- R. J. Sherrett (Can/J.17048).
- T. W. Simpson (Can/J.12681).
- J. H. T. Snow (Can/J.10888).
- R. L. B. Townsend (Can/C.15974).
- H. S. Vandewater (Can/J.16735).
- J. V. Watson (Can/J.17301).
- W. G. Wilson (Can/J.11215).
- R. E. Woods (Can/J.16183).

Pilot Officers

- E. L. Bulman (Can/J.18603).
- H. H. Farmer (Can/J.17773).
- L. L. H. Hansen (Can/J.18692).
- J. G. Kiljour (Can/J.17842).
- J. B. Macdougall (Can/C.18114).
- G. L. Spencer (Can/J.16834).
- A. C. Turner (Can/C.17967).
- C. Weaver, DFC, DFM, (Can/J.18784).

Warrant Officers

- G. C. Blair (Can/R.100088).
- W. R. Bluett (Can/R.98770).
- E. E. Davison (Can/R.95662).
- V. A. Donaldson (Can/R.128688).
- H. E. Finn (Can/R.11602).
- W. P. Foster (Can/R.114420).
- L. Kirkwood (Can/R.87872).
- E. H. Monture (Can/R.78918).
- W. J. W. Parker (Can/R.10042).
- G. C. Pienaar (Can/R.328553V).
- W. H. Webb (Can/R.129348).

Acting Warrant Officer

- J. E. Tobin (Can/R.88116).

Flight Sergeants

- Can/R.64767 W. E. Bursey.
- Can/2202 S. H. E. Calver.
- Can/R.130024 D. H. Griese.
- Can/R.14011A L. A. Harvey.
- Can/R.107485 A. E. Holton.
- Can/R.51738 W. McCullough.
- Can/R.83946 J. E. McGillivray.
- Can/7642 J. M. E. Mimeault.
- Can/R.53312 C. T. Raymond.
- Can/R.64154 H. W. Ridge.
- Can/7486 F. J. McC. Sullivan.
- Can/R.109729 N. D. Weisberg.
- Can/4358A C. E. Whitehead.
- Can/R.88851 W. J. Wilson.
- Can/R.12209A W. M. Young.

Acting Flight Sergeants

- Can/2630 H. G. Goudis.
- Can/R.80139 A. J. Heale.
- Can/R.92867 R. I. Stirling.
- Can/R.99538 R. O. Whitaker.

Sergeants

- Can/R.87967 J. J. Allman.
- Can/R.98184 C. R. Belyea.
- Can/R.107015 G. W. Bowman.
- Can/R.85068 G. W. Browell.
- Can/R.92486 R. K. Burgar.
- Can/R.152875 R. A. G. De Pape.
- Can/R.88226 G. Fanning.
- Can/R.82647 J. Frigon.
- Can/R.139973 W. H. Golding.
- Can/R.101729 J. L. Heywood.
- Can/R.143172 R. P. Husband.
- Can/R.94605 C. C. McAlpine.
- Can/R.109745 H. E. McCulloch.
- Can/R.50155 H. A. Morton.
- Can/R.141439 L. J. E. Moses.
- Can/R.97138 J. L. Pearson.
- Can/R.72370 C. Phillips.
- Can/R.63605 H. M. Robertson (deceased).
- Can/R.107275 B. C. Shannon.
- Can/R.97052 S. R. Sharrard.
- Can/R.60138 F. A. Smith.
- Can/R.59257 J. S. Stevenson.
- Can/R.68436 L. C. Sylvester.
- Can/R.73831 H. E. Thornicroft.
- Can/R.106438 R. S. Webb.
- Can/R.59491 G. Wolfe.

Corporals

- Can/R.108937 W. J. Ainslie.
- Can/R.132765 M. A. Burke.
- Can/R.69735 L. Burrows.
- Can/R.112066 P. W. Butler.
- Can/R.153977 R. J. Chisholm.
- Can/R.58030 F. J. Hart.
- Can/R.160379 J. W. Kressler.
- Can/R.129701 J. A. Larocque.
- Can/R.85059 S. C. Loree.
- Can/R.59185 W. McCowan.

Leading Aircraftmen

- Can/R.172292 E. C. Akhurst.
- Can/R.118718 F. Banner.
- Can/R.140181 A. W. Beattie.
- Can/R.54955 C. F. Champion.
- Can/R.107819 F. W. Forsberg.
- Can/R.75278 E. R. Ganong.
- Can/R.167496 J. C. Gordon.
- Can/R.89453 E. D. Hillen.
- Can/R.180789 M. J. R. Lachance.
- Can/R.173038 T. L. Mather.
- Can/R.83287 I. Troup.

Aircraftman 1st Class

- Can/R.154573 R. McK. Jones.

Flying Officer

- Nursing Sister D. C. Pitkethly (Can/C.6352).

Royal Canadian Air Force (Women's Division)
Section Officer

- E. H. Ayton (767).

Assistant Section Officer

- L. G. Simons (V.30582).

Corporals

- W.301493 L. Hall.
- W.301327 H. F. Ledingham.

Royal New Zealand Air Force
Acting Wing Commander

- R. Webb, DFC, (N.Z.391853).

Acting Squadron Leaders

- R. O. Calvert (N.Z.404890).
- W. R. Gellatly (N.Z.40563).
- B. M. Gilmour, DFC, (N.Z.412224).
- I. H. Hanlon (N.Z.404463).
- G. K. Silcock, DFC, (N.Z.411461).

Flight Lieutenant

- A. G. Christensen (N.Z.413380) (deceased).

Acting Flight Lieutenants

- F. C. Jones (N.Z.403606).
- I. G. E. McPhail (N.Z.402203).
- L. J. Montgomerie (N.Z.412377).
- A. H. Smith (N.Z.411947).
- D. C. Stewart (N.Z.40990).

Flying Officers

- G. A. Bice (N.Z.404131).
- R. R. G. Fisher (N.Z.412671).
- F. C. Fox (N.Z.40762).
- R. M. Grant (N.Z.413839) (deceased).
- W. C. K. Hender (N.Z.412690).
- H. D. Holtom (N.Z.403604).
- J. M. Pearson (N.Z.40986).
- P. P. J. Poke (N.Z.402894) (deceased).
- A. Prenter (N.Z.42306).
- D. W. Thomson, DFC, (N.Z.41613).

Pilot Officers

- W. F. Morice (N.Z.415708).
- L. S. McQ. White (N.Z.413919).

Flight Sergeants

- N.Z.412675 N. D. Freeman.
- N.Z.413265 D. E. McKenzie.
- N.Z.412737 A. H. Sowerby.

Sergeant

- N.Z.411653 S. J. Salt.

South African Air Force
Lieutenant-Colonels.

- E. G. Catton, DFC, (P.97407).
- G. N. McBlain, DFC, (2029847).

Majors

- A. G. Crowther (481797).
- O. G. Davies, DFC, (102986).
- J. H. R. Eastwood (533337V).
- H. J. T. Sheldon (97557)
- C. A. Van Vliet, DFC, (1027477).
- E. B. Woodrow, MC, (1029947).

Captains

- W. B. M. Barron (329550).
- W. R. Brighton (P.3297).
- L. W. Frewen (2410147).
- G. N. Hulett (2028967).
- B. A. Jenkinson (995917).
- E. Jones (989837).
- R. N. Purvis (137112).
- R. C. Sanders (47859).

Lieutenants

- G. D. Abernethy (1029107).
- K. P. Gordon (1023577).
- J. S. Gouns (103275) (deceased).
- A. E. T. Lord (927507).
- V. S. Muir (V.83638).
- M. I. Shore (3282707).
- R. J. Stevens (47431) (deceased).
- J. J. de Villiers (1351837).
- R. P. Waterson (961677).

2nd Lieutenants

- J. A. Hallas (V.98899).
- F. C. A. N. McGarr (956912) (deceased).

Flight Sergeants

- 96790V E. A. Amiel.
- P.4771V V. J. Coupar.
- P.5393V N. F. Furrows.
- 31688V A. H. Hayward.
- 94208V A. S. M. De Lange.
- 100094V A. W. H. Sternslow.

Air Sergeants

- P.4830 G. F. Bellville.
- 96273V J. W. Chamkins.
- 29002V L. M. Hartley.
- 99289V E. J. Waller.
- 96096V N. E. Whittle.

Air Corporals

- 100260V W. Freel.
- 52845V R. Henderson.
- 1215 Z. Ismail.
- 97693V W. L. Lawler.
- 336375V J. E. Northern.
- 96691V S. Roux.
- 98912V H. F. D. Smart.
- 206932V C. P. A. Van Rooyen.

Air Mechanics

- 96075 J. A. Gautier.
- 221645V J. Kennedy.
- P.7038V J. A. Pounden.
- P.5969V J. J. Smit.
- 101659V F. E. Welgemoed.

Private

- 3428 I. Daniel.

South African Women's Auxiliary Air Force
Major

- M. A. Smith (F.46624V).

2nd Lieutenant

- B. A. H. Hare (F.46384V).

Flight Sergeants

- F.262812V J. E. Campbell.
- F.263256V M. J. Esterhuysen.

Air Sergeant

- F.262708V M. E. Findlay.

Air Corporals

- F.262494V E. M. McNally.
- F.264213V J. H. Wolfaardt.

Indian Air Force
Flying Officer

- M. W. R. Desai, Ind.1794.

Corporal

- Ind.13171 P. P. V. Samuel.

Artificers, 1st Class

- Ind.3053 Conception.
- Ind.3188 Habibullah.
- Ind.3080 J. Lanson.
- Ind.3007 G. Nabi.
- Ind.3578 D. Singh.
- Ind.3281 G. Singh.
- Ind.3488 M. Singh.

Indian Women's Auxiliary Corps
Junior Commander

- S. M. Kershaw.

RAF Levies
Lieutenant-Colonel

- G. Peace, TD.

Majors

- G. E. C. Hudson (52034).
- D. B. Huxley (100288).
- C. S. Pryor (76074).
- A. J. Reaper (154001).

Captain.

- W. Boyes (66773).

Lieutenants.

- J. H. Andrew (104688).
- A. R. Stewart(294590).

Warrant Officer 2nd Class

- L. G. Goodsell (6280529).

Senior Sergeant

- R. Fritchley (5047935)

Sergeant

- R. J. Hill (7583882).

Rab Emma

- L. Adam (X93).
- M. Yacube (X42).
- Y. Hassado (X16).
- E. Gewergis (X9).
- S. Oshana (X42).
- W. Eshu (X18).

Rab Khamshi

- A. Kader (X265).
- A. Rathi (X168).

Rab Khaila

- Z. Gewergis.

Rab Tremma

- Y. Ismail (X1).
- S. Paulos (X3).
- Y. Khoshaba (X13).

Civilian

- C. Cachia.

Royal New Zealand Air Force
Mentioned in despatches
Flight Lieutenant

- G. A. Delves (N.Z.40757).

Flight Sergeant

- N.Z.42441 D. K. Mulligan.
