= Geoffrey Warnes =

Royal Air Force officer (1914–1944)

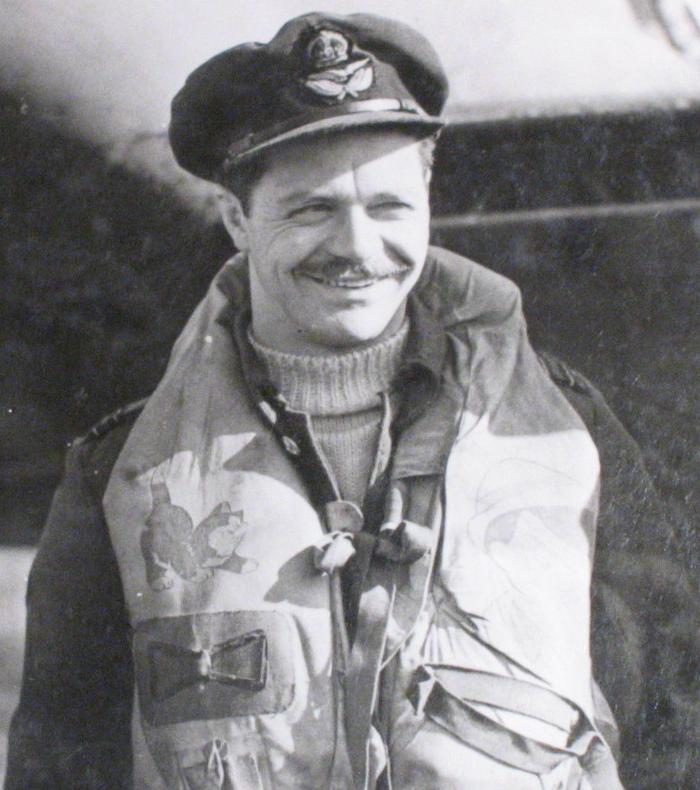
- Born: 22 October 1914; Leeds, Yorkshire, England
- Died: 22 February 1944 (aged 29); English Channel, off Guernsey, Channel Islands
- Military career
- Allegiance: United Kingdom
- Branch: Royal Air Force
- Service years: 1940–1944
- Rank: Squadron Leader
- Service number: 78429 RAFVR
- Commands: No. 263 Squadron RAF
- Conflicts: Second World War: European air campaign †
- Awards: Distinguished Service Order; Distinguished Flying Cross

Squadron Leader Geoffrey Berrington Warnes, DSO, DFC (22 October 1914 – 22 February 1944) was a British pilot who flew with No. 263 Squadron RAF during the Second World War. He was described by Group Captain Johnnie Johnson as a "gay, cheerful character" who was a "leader of men".

== Early life ==
Warnes was born on 22 October 1914, the son of Clifford and Dorothy Warnes. As a child he lived in Headingley, Leeds; he was educated at Cockburn High School, leaving in 1931 "to work in an office". He was a member of the Civil Air Guard where he learnt to fly with the Yorkshire Aeroplane Club at Yeadon Aerodrome, his instructor was "Ginger" Lacey (later squadron leader). He played rugby with Headingley Rugby Club (now Leeds Tykes) from 1936 until the outbreak of war.

== War service ==
At the outbreak of the Second World War, Warnes volunteered as a pilot, but was rejected because he wore glasses and his eyesight was too bad to be corrected by lenses in flying goggles. He persisted and was eventually rewarded when he was accepted for ground duties. He was commissioned as an acting pilot officer (on probation) in April 1940. He was posted to France, but on returning after the Fall of France, he was posted to a barrage balloon squadron. He continued in his efforts to fly and was transferred to the General Duties Branch in November 1940, for training as a flying instructor. He accumulated 400 hours teaching trainee RAF pilots on Tiger Moths, whilst still trying to get transferred to a combat unit. He was wearing spectacles under his flying goggles, but was challenged by his medical officer about the safety of this. With the threat of being grounded, he consulted a specialist and, using £50 of his own money, invested in contact lenses. He was sent to Group Captain Philip Livingston, a consultant ophthalmologist in the RAF Medical Services, who gave permission for Warnes to fly on active missions. He was posted to No. 263 Squadron RAF at Charmy Down in Somerset.

=== Westland Whirlwinds ===
No. 263 Squadron flew Whirlwinds, a twin-engined heavy fighter; the new No. 137 Squadron RAF had just been formed at that airfield, it was the only other squadron to be equipped with Whirlwinds and some of 263's experienced pilots were transferred to it. Geoffrey Warnes's first recorded mission on 19 September 1941 was a Mandolin operation to attack Morlaix aerodrome in Brittany. Four aircraft flew from Predannack in Cornwall, but they failed to locate their target and "inconclusive attacks were made on a pill box". Spitfires from 313 Squadron provided an escort "but showed no very marked inclination to stick close to the Whirlwinds". On 9 November Warnes was promoted to flight lieutenant and appointed Flight Commander of "B" Flight. The winter of 1941–1942 was quiet, with much fog and snow. In February, the squadron was moved to Fairwood Common near Swansea in Wales, and April saw them moved west to Angle in Pembrokeshire; that summer would be spent mainly on the routine tasks of convoy protection and reconnaissance patrolling from these parts of Wales.

As well as its fighter capability, the Whirlwind could operate as a fighter-bomber. In August 1942, No. 263 Squadron moved to Colerne in Wiltshire, bomb-racks were fitted to eight aircraft and nearly all members of "A" and "B" flights granted a week's leave while this was carried out. After brief bombing practice at the beginning of September, the squadron moved to Warmwell in Dorset, from which their first bombing operation on 9 September was successful. Four aircraft, including Warnes', flew armed with 250 lb bombs. They encountered "four ships of the large armed trawler type" off Cape La Hague and sank two. Much of the next two months were spent on armed reconnaissance, Rhubarb and Roadstead operations.

On 9 December 1942, Warnes became Commanding Officer (CO) of No. 263 Squadron and was promoted squadron leader, his predecessor having been shot down off Jersey two days before and later presumed killed. 1943 brought considerably more action than the previous year, chiefly the bombing of shipping and railway lines in northern France, along with more routine work. Geoffrey Warnes was awarded the Distinguished Flying Cross on 17 February 1943 and the Distinguished Service Order on 13 June that year. Two days after which he completed his tour of duty and was posted as second-in-command of operations at No 10 Group headquarters. The following is a text extract from the squadron records:

During that time the work of the Squadron … was largely the personal creation of S/Ldr G B Warnes. Briefly he was a strict disciplinarian who combined a fierce and forthright manner with personal kindness; a Commander who never left the least doubt about what he wanted and who consistently obtained these qualities because he himself consistently displayed them: he himself did even more than he required of others. As a tactician S/Ldr Warnes may have some place in the history of the War, as the creator of medium-level dive bombing by fighter-bombers (…). His notes on shipping attacks … have been adopted as a Fighter Command Tactical Memorandum.

=== Hawker Typhoons ===
No. 263 Squadron flew its last operation with Whirlwinds from RAF Warmwell on 29 November 1943. On 2 December, the first six Hawker Typhoons, its new aircraft, arrived at the airfield. On 3 December, Westlands, who built the Whirlwind, gave a party for the squadron in nearby Yeovil and the next day 12 aircraft flew in formation over the town.

On 5 December 1943, Warnes returned to active duty with his squadron. The men had moved by road to Ibsley, their new planes being flown over by another squadron. His first task as CO was develop the squadron's tactics with their new aircraft. There were no more operational flights until February. From now on, they would be flying this single-engined strike fighter, which could carry ground-attack rockets or a small bomb load. Typhoons had been flown by squadrons as early as September 1941, but its engine was still giving concern at the end of 1943 – it had problems which would not be cured until the end of the war was near. After flying a reliable twin-engined aircraft, pilots felt much less secure, aside from the usual operational dangers, they would be flying to northern France over 60–120 miles of open sea with only one, occasionally unreliable, engine.

On 1 February 1944, the squadron came back into operational readiness at RAF Beaulieu. Operations were mainly conducted over the Cherbourg peninsular and included attacks on V-weapon launch sights. On 12 February, Warnes shot down a Dornier 217 over Brittany and the next day he chased and destroyed a Messerschmitt 109F near Chartres. 14 February saw many of the pilots undertaking dinghy drill in Bournemouth swimming baths, followed by "an evening of various pleasures".

22 February "proved disastrous to the squadron". After refuelling at Harrowbeer, nine aircraft carried out shipping reconnaissance west of the Channel Islands. No enemy action took place, but Warnes was forced to ditch his aircraft (Typhoon Ib, MN249) and he was seen swimming towards what looked like an uninflated dinghy. Twenty-one-year-old Flying Officer Bob Tuff of the Royal Australian Air Force said that he was going to bail out to help him, Flight Lieutenant Gerald Racine told him not to, but his order was ignored or not heard. Three men lost their lives on that day, as a third pilot, Flying Officer Robert Hunter, was not heard of again.
