= Ronald Hamlyn =

British flying ace of WWII

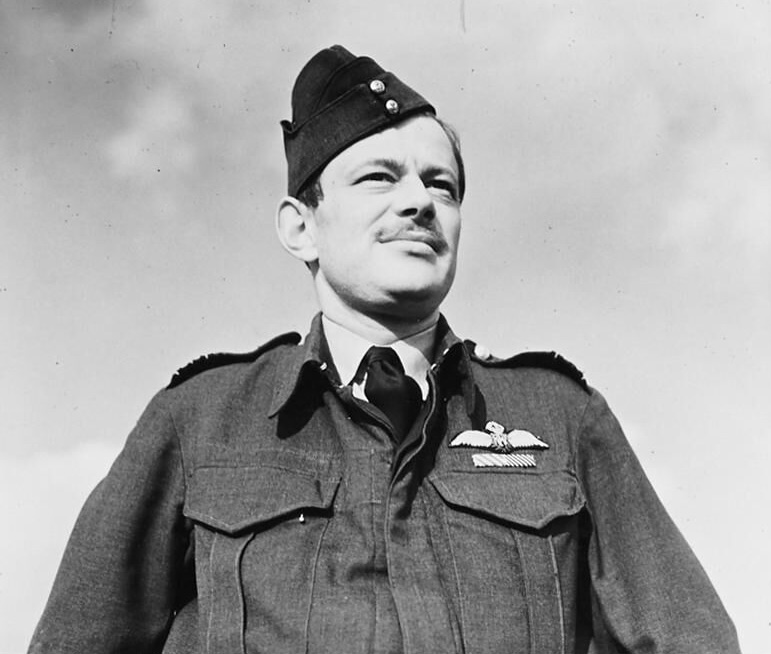
- Hamlyn in 1943
- Born: 26 February 1914; Harrogate, England
- Died: April 1991 (aged 77)
- Military career
- Allegiance: United Kingdom
- Branch: Royal Air Force
- Service years: 1936–1957
- Rank: Squadron Leader
- Commands: No. 275 Squadron; No. 276 Squadron
- Conflicts: Second World War: Battle of Britain; Circus offensive
- Awards: Air Force Cross; Distinguished Flying Medal

Ronald Hamlyn AFC, DFM (26 February 1914–April 1991) was a British flying ace with the Royal Air Force (RAF) during the Second World War. He was credited with having destroyed at least ten German aircraft.

Born in Harrogate, Hamlyn joined the RAF in 1936 and was serving with No. 72 Squadron as a sergeant pilot on the outbreak of the Second World War. He flew Supermarine Spitfire fighters during the squadron's operations over Dunkirk as part of Operation Dynamo. He joined No. 610 Squadron immediately afterwards and flew extensively during the Battle of Britain, destroying several German aircraft including five in one day, on 24 August, for which he was awarded the Distinguished Flying Medal. The following year, he was commissioned as a pilot officer and posted to No. 242 Squadron with which he achieved his final aerial victories. He received his first squadron command in October 1941, being tasked with the formation of No. 275 Squadron, an air-sea rescue (ASR) unit. His work on ASR duties led to an award of the Air Force Cross. For the last two years of the war, he carried out staff and instructing duties. He remained in the RAF in the postwar period, serving until his retirement as a squadron leader in 1957. In civilian life, he worked for the Save the Children Fund. He died in April 1991, aged 77.

== Early life ==
Ronald Fairfax Hamlyn was born on 26 February 1914 in Harrogate, England, and was educated at Clifton House and Pocklington Grammar School. Once he finished his schooling, he worked in an insurance company as a junior administrator. He joined the Royal Air Force (RAF) in 1936, taking his initial flight training at No. 11 Elementary & Reserve Flying Training School at Perth. He proceeded to the next phase of training at No. 8 Flying Training School at Montrose from which he graduated as a sergeant pilot.

== Second World War ==
At the time of the outbreak of the Second World War, Hamlyn was serving with No. 72 Squadron. At the time, it was based at Church Fenton and equipped with the Supermarine Spitfire fighter. It subsequently moved to Leconfield, from where it carried out convoy patrols and interception duties until it was moved to Scotland. It returned to the south of England in March 1940, based at Acklington. During the final stages of Operation Dynamo, the evacuation of the British Expeditionary Force from Dunkirk in France, the squadron shifted to Gravesend from where it sortied extensively to provide aerial cover for the British troops. On 5 June, Hamlyn made an error when landing after the squadron's final sortie from Gravesend, failing to lock his undercarriage in place and causing his Spitfire to pancake onto the landing strip.

=== Battle of Britain ===
No. 72 Squadron was replaced by No. 610 Squadron on 6 June, and Hamlyn was attached to the new unit. This was shortly made a permanent posting. Hamlyn's Spitfire-equipped squadron was tasked with patrolling along the English Channel and on the afternoon of 3 July, he, his flight leader John Ellis, and four other pilots of the squadron, shared in the destruction of a Dornier Do 17 medium bomber near Folkestone. Later in the month the squadron moved to Biggin Hill but remained heavily engaged in the aerial fighting over southeast England. Hamlyn damaged a Messerschmitt Bf 109 fighter over Dover on 14 August. This was followed by his most successful day as a fighter pilot; on 24 August, he destroyed a Junkers Ju 88 medium bomber over Dover and a Bf 109, and in subsequent sorties the same day, shot down three more Bf 109s. Two days later, in engagements near Dover, he shot down one Bf 109 and probably destroyed a second. On 28 August, he destroyed a Bf 109 near Deal and on the last day of the month, shot down another Bf 109, this time near Biggin Hill. His run of successes saw him awarded the Distinguished Flying Medal (DFM). The announcement was made on 13 September; the citation, published in The London Gazette, read:

In August, 1940, whilst on an offensive patrol, Sergeant Hamlyn attacked and destroyed one Junkers 88, and one Messerschmitt 109. A few hours later he engaged a Messerschmitt 109, chased it across the English Channel and finally shot it down over Calais where it crashed in flames. Shortly afterwards he attacked and destroyed two further enemy aircraft, thus making a total of five in one day. Altogether this airman pilot has personally destroyed at least seven enemy aircraft. He has displayed great courage and good marksmanship.

— London Gazette, No. 34945, 13 September 1940

=== Circus offensive ===
By the time of the announcement of Hamlyn's DFM, No. 610 Squadron had been withdrawn to Acklington for a period of duty at reduced operational intensity. At the end of 1940, it moved again, this time to Westhampnett, where it would remain for several months. In June 1941, Hamlyn, who had been commissioned as a pilot officer earlier in the year, was posted to No. 242 Squadron.

Unlike his former units, the squadron was equipped with Hawker Hurricane fighters. Operating from North Weald, it carried out bomber escort duties as part of the RAF's Circus offensive. In August, it moved to Manston and was also tasked with anti-shipping duties. On one escort mission, involving Bristol Blenheim light bombers attacking Béthune on 4 July, Hamlyn shot down a Bf 109 near Gravelines. He destroyed another Bf 109 near Calais on 27 July and at the end of the month became an acting flight lieutenant and appointed the leader of one of the squadron's flights. He received a substantive promotion to flying officer two months later.

=== Squadron command ===
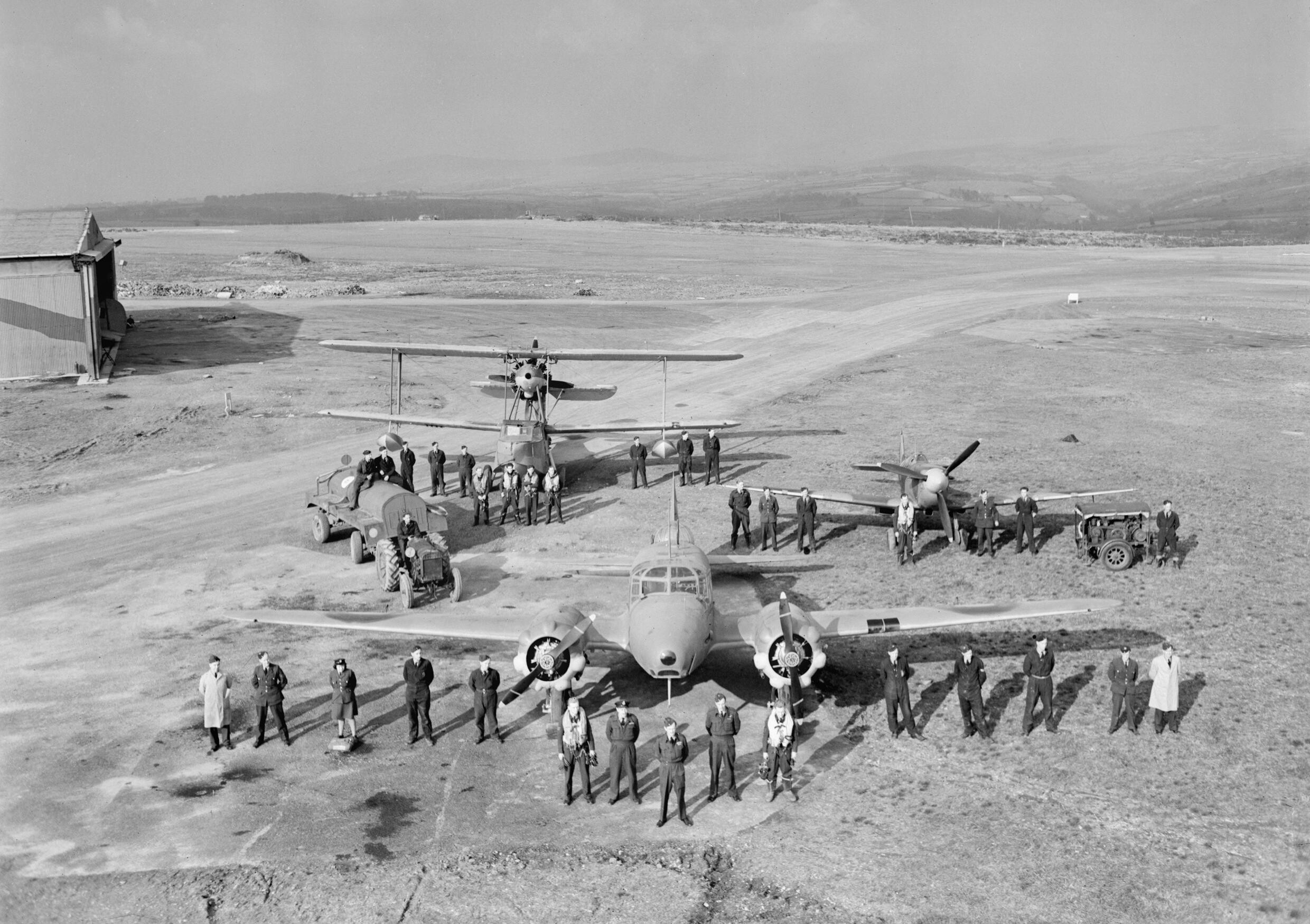
Personnel and some aircraft of No. 276 Squadron assembled at Harrowbeer, Devon. Hamlyn stands in the foreground

In October Hamlyn was rested from operational duties and posted to the RAF station at Valley where he was to form and command No. 275 Squadron. This was an air-sea rescue (ASR) squadron for Fighter Command's No. 9 Group and operated Westland Lysanders and the Supermarine Walrus seaplane over the Irish Sea. He later commanded No. 276 Squadron, another ASR unit, which operated Walruses from Harrowbeer in Devon. It also used Spitfires and the two-seater Boulton Paul Defiant fighter as spotter aircraft for downed aircrew. By this time Hamlyn's substantive rank was flight lieutenant, having received this promotion in late September 1942. For his work in ASR, he was awarded the Air Force Cross in the 1943 New Year Honours.

=== Later war service ===
Hamlyn was posted to the headquarters of Bomber Command later in 1943, where he served as the ASR officer. The following year he was attached to the United States Ninth Air Force, working as its tactics liaison officer while it was based in Normandy. A posting as a staff officer at the Air Ministry followed in late 1944. In February 1945 Hamlyn was assigned to instructing duties, firstly at No. 41 Operational Training Unit (OTU) and then with No. 58 OTU, where he was serving when the war ended.

== Later life ==
Remaining in the RAF in the postwar period, Hamyln was appointed station commander at Maidugari in West Africa in September 1945. His substantive rank was made up to squadron leader on 1 November 1947 and he eventually retired from the RAF in this rank in 1957. In civilian life, he settled in the southwest of England and worked for the Save the Children Fund. He retired in the 1980s and moved to Sussex. He died in April 1991.

Hamlyn is credited with having shot down eleven aircraft, with one of these shared with other pilots. He is also credited with one aircraft probably destroyed and one damaged. His medals which, in addition to the AFC and DFM, included the 1939-1945 Star, with Battle of Britain clasp, the Air Crew Europe Star, with France and Germany clasp, the Defence Medal, War Medal, and the 1953 Coronation Medal, came up for auction in November 2014. They sold for £75,000.
