= RAF Bolt Head =

Former air base in Salcombe, Devon, England

RAF Bolt Head
- Near Salcombe, Devon in England

Site information
- Type: Royal Air Force satellite station
- Code: OH
- Owner: Air Ministry
- Operator: Royal Air Force
- Controlled by: RAF Fighter Command * No. 10 Group RAF * No. 11 Group RAF

Location
- Shown within Devon RAF Bolt Head (the United Kingdom)
- Coordinates: 50°13′24″N 003°48′21″W

Site history
- Built: 1941
- In use: 1941–1947
- Battles/wars: European Theatre of World War II

Airfield information
- Elevation: 420 feet (128 m) AMSL
Runways
Direction	Length and surface
00/00	1,121 metres (3,678 ft) Sommerfeld Tracking
00/00	1,280 metres (4,199 ft) Sommerfeld Tracking

Royal Air Force Bolt Head or more simply RAF Bolt Head is a former Royal Air Force satellite station 1 mile (1.6 km) south west of Salcombe on the south Devon coast, England from 1941 to 1945. During the Second World War it was used as a satellite for RAF Exeter. There were two runways, of 3,680 ft at 45° and 4,200 ft at 120°.

The Ground Control Interceptor Station (GCI) RAF Hope Cove was established on the northeast side of the field in 1941 to direct fighter operations in the English Channel. Unlike the airfield, Hope Cove remained in use into the 1990s.

Today the Second World War buildings are almost all gone but a memorial to the airfield's war-time history exists in the centre of the site, two notable post-war buildings survive including a large R6 Rotor bunker (used until 1994 as a regional seat of government) and a grass airstrip is still used occasionally by light aircraft. The landowners also hosted an air display there in 2009 which saw a Hurricane and Spitfire visit the airfield for the first time since the war.

== RAF units and aircraft ==
Unit	Dates	Aircraft	Variant	Notes
No. 16 Squadron RAF	1940–1941	Westland Lysander	III	Detachments from RAF Weston Zoyland.
No. 41 Squadron RAF	29 April – 16 May 1944 & 24 May – 19 June 1944	Supermarine Spitfire	XII	Attended APC Fairwood Common, 17–23 May 1944.
No. 234 (Madras Presidency) Squadron RAF	1944	Supermarine Spitfire	VI	
No. 257 (Burma) Squadron RAF	1942	Hawker Typhoon	IA and IB	Detachments from RAF Exeter.
No. 263 (Fellowship of the Bellows) Squadron RAF	1943	Westland Whirlwind	I	Detachments from RAF Warmwell.
No. 263 (Fellowship of the Bellows) Squadron RAF	1944	Hawker Typhoon	IB	
No. 266 (Rhodesia) Squadron RAF	1944	Hawker Typhoon	IB	
No. 275 Squadron RAF	1944	Supermarine Spitfire	VC	Later moved to RAF Exeter with detachments back to Bolt Head.
No. 276 Squadron RAF	1944	Various		Detachment from RAF Portreath.
No. 310 (Czechoslovak) Squadron RAF	1942	Supermarine Spitfire	VB and VC	Detachments from RAF Exeter.
No. 421 (Red Indian) Squadron RCAF	1942	Supermarine Spitfire	VB	Detachments from RAF Exeter.
No. 610 (County of Chester) Squadron AAF	1943	Supermarine Spitfire	VC	
No. 611 (West Lancashire) Squadron AAF	1944	Supermarine Spitfire	IX	

The following units were here at some point:

- Detachment from No. 10 Group Communication Flight RAF (February – October 1943)
- No. 2704 Squadron RAF Regiment
- No. 2715 Squadron RAF Regiment
- No. 2738 Squadron RAF Regiment
- No. 2953 Squadron RAF Regiment
- No. 4179 Anti-Aircraft Flight RAF Regiment

During the Second World War, 17 personnel operating from RAF Bolt Head were killed in action or died on active service.
