= No. 263 Squadron RAF =

Former flying squadron of the Royal Air Force

No. 263 (Fellowship of the Bellows) Squadron RAF
- Official Squadron badge of No. 263 Squadron RAF
- Active: 27 September 1918 – 16 May 1919; 20 October 1939 – 28 August 1945; 29 August 1945 – 1 July 1958; 1 June 1959 – 30 June 1963
- Country: United Kingdom
- Branch: Royal Air Force
- Part of: RAF Fighter Command
- Nickname: "Fellowship of the Bellows"
- Mottos: Latin: Ex ungue leonem ("One knows the lion by his claws")
- Engagements: Italy (1918–19); Norway (1940)

Insignia
- Squadron Badge heraldry: A lion rampant, holding in its forepaws a cross The lion represents the squadron's association with Scotland, the cross comes from the flag of Norway
- Squadron Codes: HE (Oct 1939 – May 1950)
- Post-1950 squadron roundel

No 263 Squadron was a Royal Air Force fighter squadron formed in Italy towards the end of the First World War. After being disbanded in 1919 it was reformed in 1939 flying mainly strike and heavy fighter aircraft until becoming No 1 Squadron in 1958.

== History ==
=== First World War ===
The squadron was formed in Italy on 27 September 1918 from flights of the Royal Naval Air Service after that service's amalgamation with the Royal Flying Corps to form the RAF. It flew Sopwith Babies and Felixstowe F3s from Otranto reconnoitring for submarines escaping from the Adriatic Sea into the Mediterranean Sea. The squadron was disbanded on 16 May 1919.

=== Second World War ===
The squadron reformed as a fighter squadron at RAF Filton near Bristol on 2 October 1939, taking over some of No. 605 Squadron's biplane Gloster Gladiator Mk.Is. It became operational towards the end of the year and scrambled for the first time on 12 January 1940. Around this time the squadron received 22 Gloster Gladiator Mk.IIs to replace the Mk.Is The Gladiator was obsolete by the time of the Second World War, being only slightly faster than the Heinkel He 111 medium bomber used by the Luftwaffe.

==== Gloster Gladiator and Norway ====
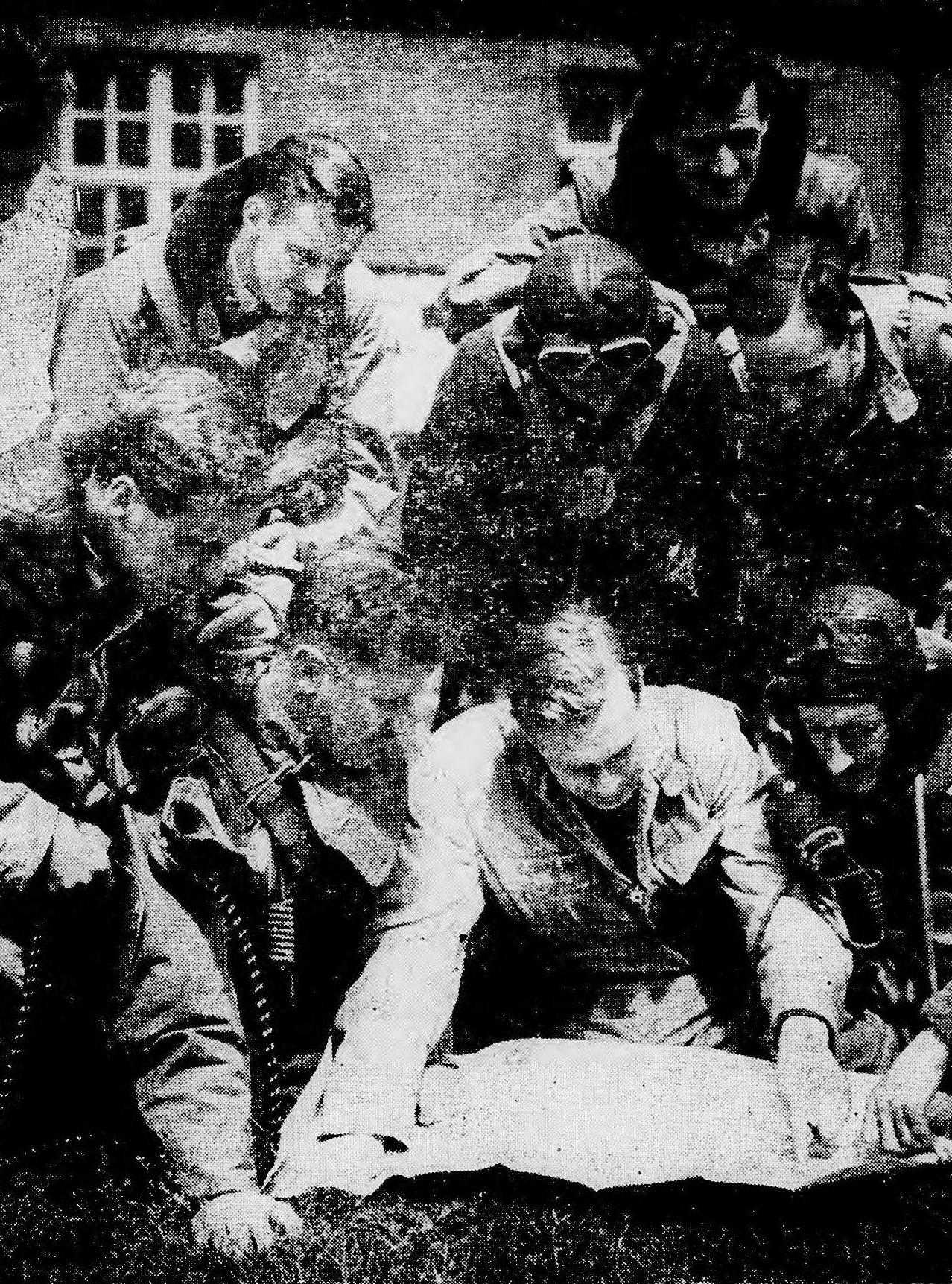
Bermudian Flying Officer Herman Francis Grant Ede DFC and other RAF pilots

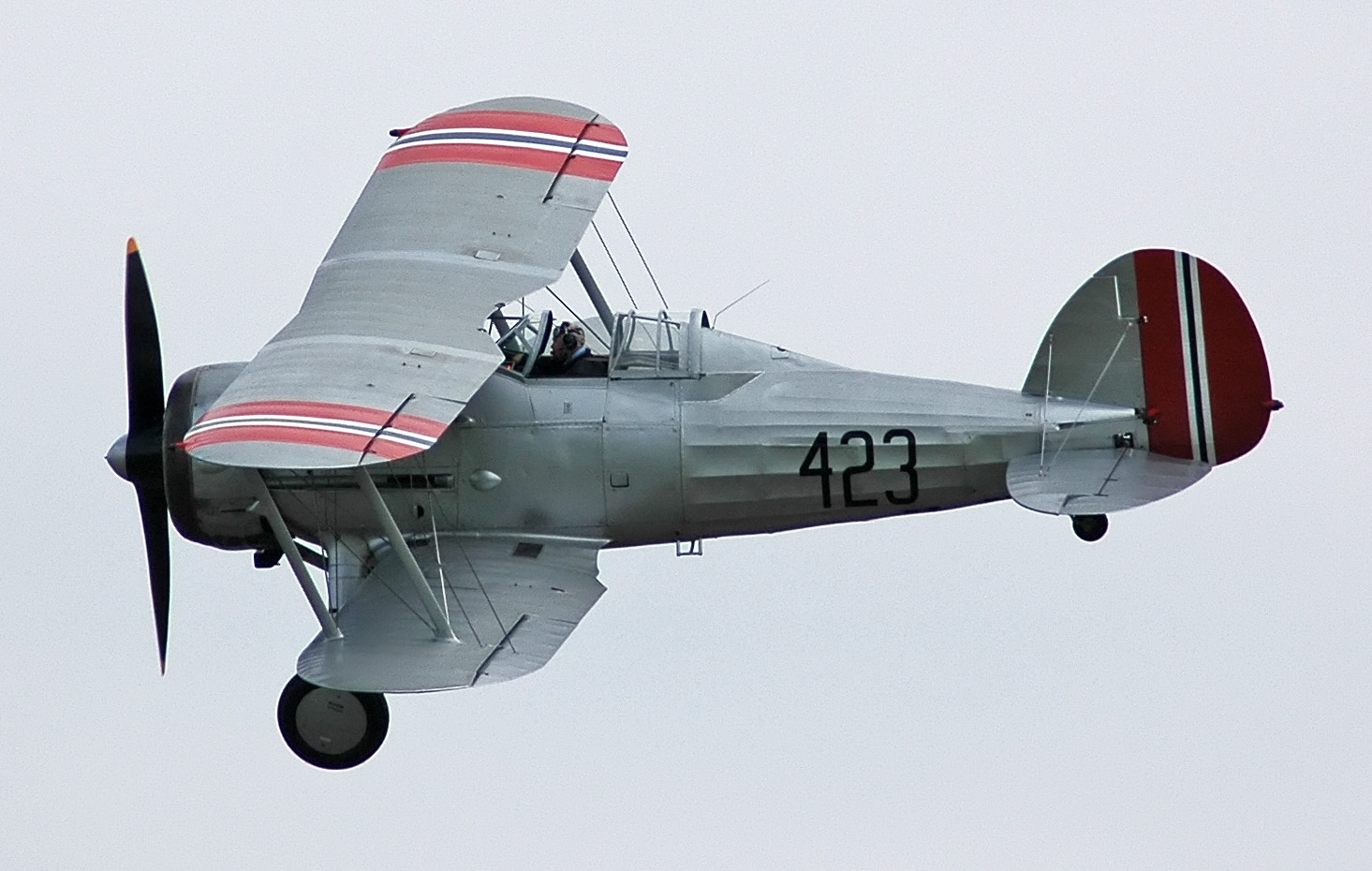
Gloster Gladiator Mk.I in RNoAF colours

Germany invaded Norway on 9 April 1940 and No. 263 Squadron was soon instructed to prepare for a move. On 20 April, the aircraft were flown, via RAF Sealand, to Scapa Flow, Scotland where Fleet Air Arm pilots landed them on the aircraft carrier HMS Glorious and 18 Gladiators sailed for Norway. On 24 April, after two days sailing, the squadron flew its aircraft off the carrier to a landing strip on the frozen lake Lesjaskogsvatnet in Oppland in central southern Norway.

Unfortunately for the enterprise, the squadron was extremely short of ground staff and equipment and few of its Gladiators had been prepared for combat before the Luftwaffe struck with Heinkel He 111s shortly after daybreak on 25 April. By the end of 26 April, although No. 263 Squadron had managed to destroy two Heinkels, all of its aircraft had been destroyed or rendered unserviceable and by the end of the month the squadron was ordered home.

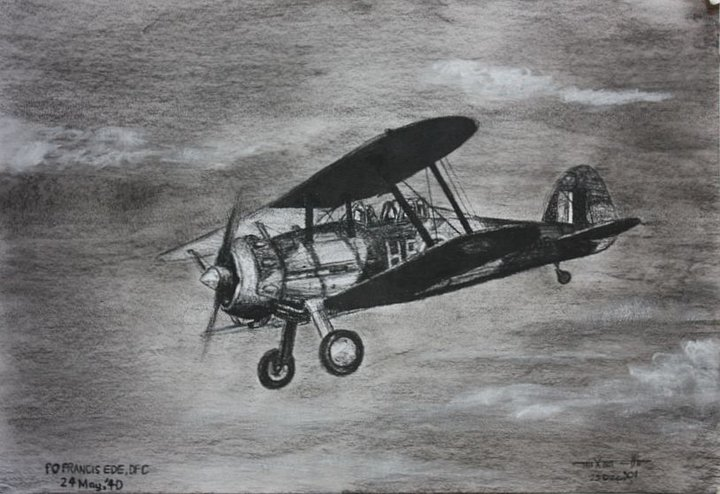
Artist's impression of the Gloster Gladiator flown by Bermudian Flying Officer H.F.G. "Baba" Ede, DFC, on the 24th May, 1940

The re-equipped squadron returned to the far north of Norway on 21 May, flying from Bardufoss airfield, near Narvik, reinforced by No. 46 Squadron whose Hurricanes arrived a few days later, using an airstrip in Skånland Municipality. Due to unsuitable ground at Skånland, 46 Squadron moved so that both were operating from Bardufoss by 27 May.

The squadrons had been ordered to defend the fleet anchorage at Skånland and the military base at Harstad on the island of Hinnøya. Action was short but intense before the squadrons were instructed on 2 June to prepare for evacuation; 263 Squadron had flown 249 sorties and claimed 26 enemy aircraft destroyed. 263's ten surviving Gladiators were landed on HMS Glorious on 7 June. Glorious sailed but was intercepted by the German battleships Gneisenau and Scharnhorst. The aircraft carrier was sunk and with it the aircraft from four squadrons. 263 Squadron lost its CO, S/Ldr John W Donaldson, F/Lt Alvin T Williams and P.O. Sidney Robert McNamara along with seven other pilots. Among the pilots who fought with the squadron in Norway and died on Glorious, was F.O. Grant Ede, DFC, one of many Bermudians to serve in the RAF during the war and the first Bermudian to die in the war.

==== Westland Whirlwind ====
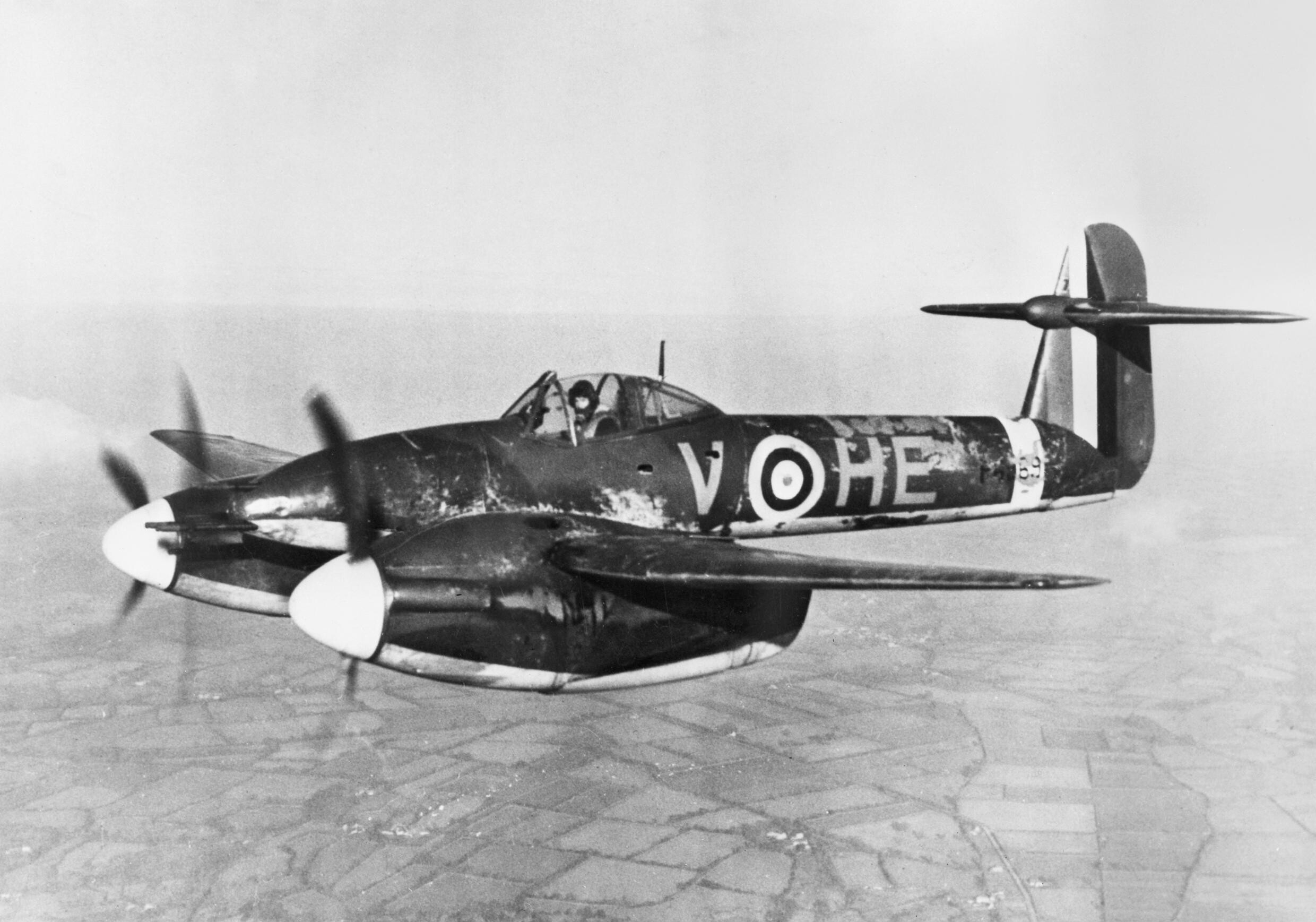
Whirlwind Mk I, No. 263 Squadron in flight over West Country

The Westland Whirlwind was the first cannon-armed fighter for the RAF, first flown in October 1938 and at the production stage by 1940. It was a twin engined heavy fighter (also able to function as a fighter bomber with 500-pound (230 kg) bombload). With four 20mm Hispano cannon in the nose, it was more powerful than an eight-gunned fighter like the Spitfire or Hurricane. It was fast, matching the current Spitfire's maximum speed, but performed best at low altitude and was used for convoy escort and against small targets in the English Channel and northern France. Only 114 were produced (compared with over 20,000 Spitfires).

No. 263 Squadron spent the next six months with 13 Group near Edinburgh. It assembled on 10 June 1940 at RAF Drem and after two weeks moved to RAF Grangemouth, where it spent three months before returning to Drem until November and then moving again south to be nearer its intended targets in northern France and the English Channel.

During its time in Scotland, it had to sort out the final problems with the Rolls-Royce Peregrine engines and Hispano cannon. To fill the gap the squadron was provided with Hawker Hurricanes which were flown in action a few times. Production of the Peregrine by Rolls-Royce was slow and it was November before the squadron was fully equipped. The squadron transferred to RAF Exeter, commencing Chameleon patrols against enemy E-boats stationed in the English Channel and Western Approaches. The E-boats would rescue German bomber crews who had "ditched" in the sea. Here, on 12 January 1941, a section patrolling near the Isles of Scilly located a Junkers Ju 88 and Pilot Officer (PO) Stein was credited with a probable kill.

As well as its fighter capability, the Whirlwind could operate as a fighter-bomber. In September 1941 S/Ldr Thomas Pugh, the squadron's 21-year-old commander, suggested that the bombing capability should be investigated, however the idea was initially rejected. Finally, in August 1942 the squadron moved to RAF Colerne in Wiltshire and bomb-racks were fitted to eight aircraft; initially two 250-pound (110 kg) bombs could be carried, and later this was increased to two 500-pound (230 kg) bombs.

No. 263 Squadron flew Whirlwinds until the end of 1943, with the three years operating the type being spent in the west of the country: two years in airfields around Wiltshire, Dorset and Gloucestershire, six months in south Wales, and six months in Devon and Cornwall. Apart from periods of training and "rest and recuperation," the squadron's operations involved: air-ground attacks on airfields, railways and roads in northern France; air-sea attacks on enemy shipping (E-boats and armed trawlers); sea convoy escort; and bomber escort.

==== Hawker Typhoon ====
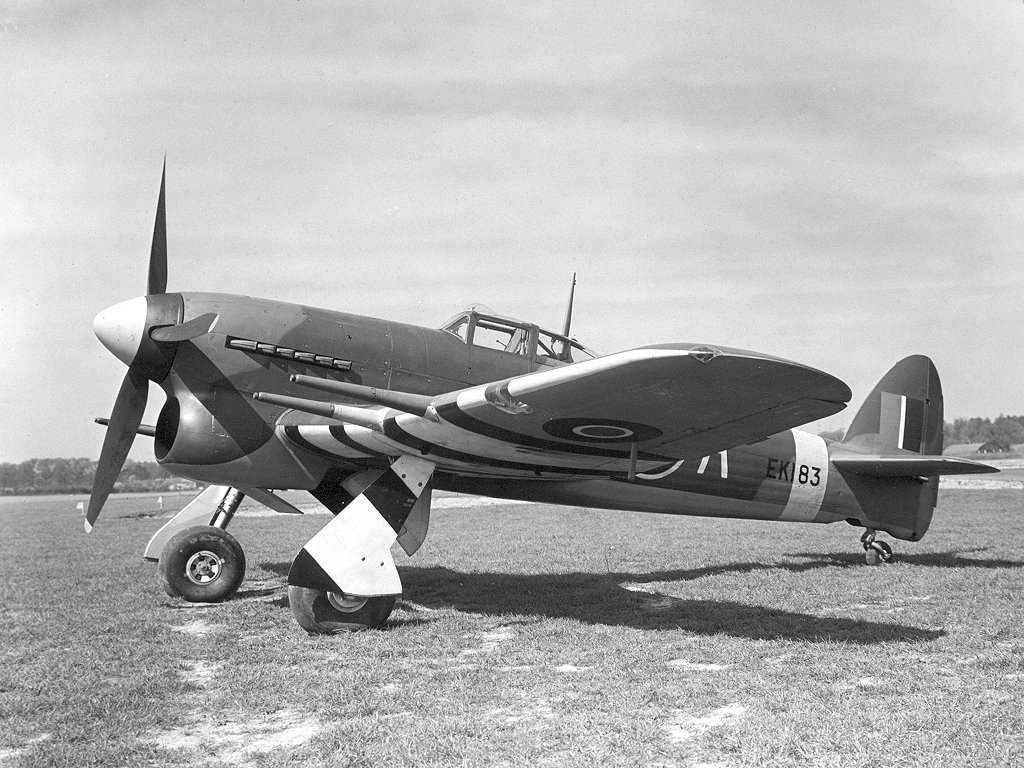
Hawker Typhoon

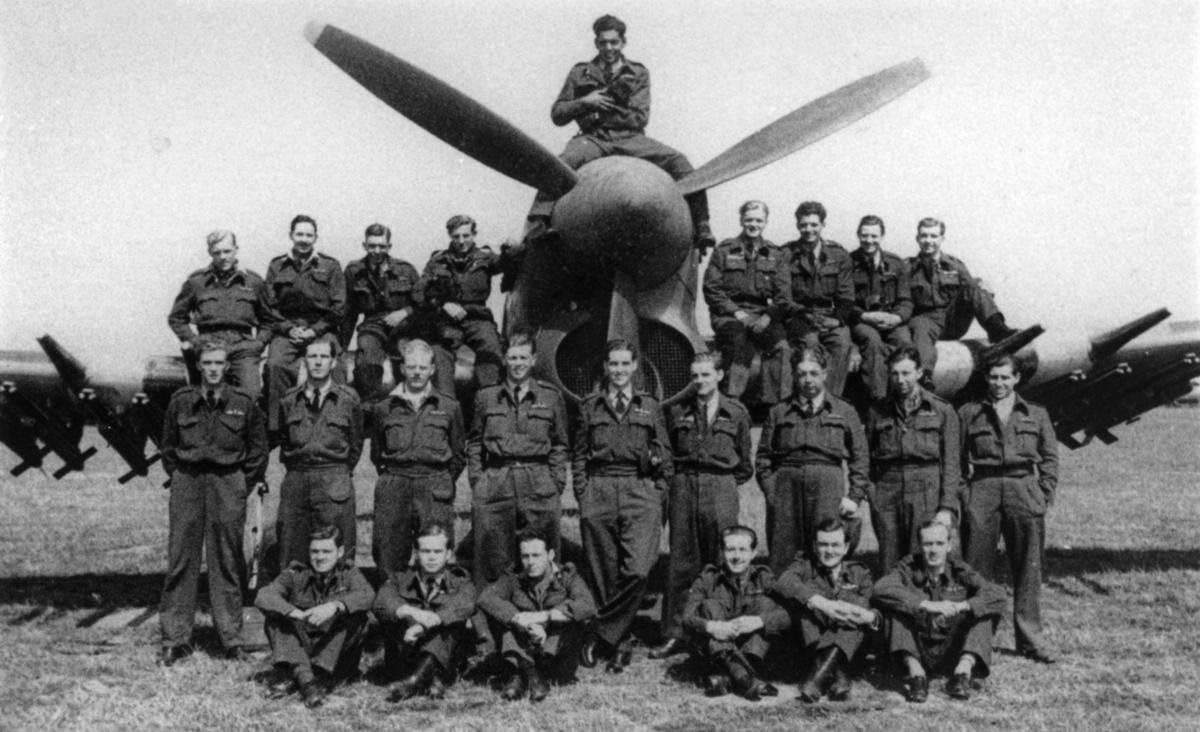
Pilots of No.263 Squadron pose in front of their Typhoon. Pilot Officer Thyagarajan, an Indian pilot is seated on the engine cowling

Like the Whirlwind, the Hawker Typhoon 1B was a fighter bomber or strike fighter. Although only powered by a single engine, the Napier Sabre, it was more powerful (2,260 hp) than the two Peregrine (885 hp each) Whirlwind engines. As well as four cannon it could be armed with two (later four) 500 lb (227 kg) bombs or eight "60lb" rockets. Like the Whirlwind it performed at its best at lower altitudes.

In December 1943, 263 Squadron became non-operational while aircrew and ground staff became familiar with the new plane. By the end of the month flying on the Whirlwind had shrunk to 22 hours and over 309 hours had been flown on the Typhoon. After two weeks Armament Practice Camp at RAF Fairwood Common, the squadron became operational again on 1 February 1944 and attacked for the first time on 3 February when three divebombing operations took place.

On 27 August 1944 the squadron and No. 266 Squadron RAF Typhoons with Spitfire escort was mistakenly ordered to attack the Royal Navy 1st Minesweeping Flotilla off Cap d'Antifer, Le Havre, with the result that HMS Britomart and Hussar were sunk and Salamander was irreparably damaged, killing 117 sailors and wounding 153 more.

==== Cap Arcona ====
On 3 May 1945, three ships, the Cap Arcona, the Thielbek and the Deutschland, were sunk as a result of four attacks by Hawker Typhoons of No. 83 Group RAF. After No. 184 Squadron RAF and No. 198 Squadron RAF it was 263 Squadron's, by then based in RAF Ahlhorn (Großenkneten) who were led by Squadron Leader Marten T. S. Rumbold.

== Post-war ==
After disbandment on 28 August 1945, No. 616 Squadron RAF with the Gloster Meteor jet fighters was renumbered as 263 squadron at RAF Acklington. After Meteors, 263 Squadron moved onto Hawker Hunters in 1955. The unit arrived at Wattisham in October 1950, and transferred to RAF Stradishall in August 1957. It was disbanded there on 1 July 1958 and renumbered to become No. 1 Squadron RAF. It was reformed for the last time on 1 June 1959 to operate the Bristol Bloodhound surface-to-air missile at RAF Watton until disbanding on 30 June 1963.

== Aircraft operated ==
Aircraft operated by No. 263 Squadron RAF
Date	Type
1918–1919	Sopwith Baby
1918	Hamble Baby
1918–1919	Short 184
1918–1919	Short 320
1918–1919	Felixstowe F.3
1939–1940	Gloster Gladiator I
1939–1940	Gloster Gladiator II
1940	Hawker Hurricane I
1940–1943	Westland Whirlwind I
1943–1945	Hawker Typhoon IB
1945–1948	Gloster Meteor F.3
1950–1955	Gloster Meteor F.8
1955–1956	Hawker Hunter F.2
1955–1956	Hawker Hunter F.5
1956–1958	Hawker Hunter F.6
1959–1963	Bristol Bloodhound I

== Organisation ==
Commanding Officers during World War II
Served from	Name	Notes
October 1939	Sqn/Ldr John W Donaldson, DSO, AFC	Missing/KIA 9 June 1940 aged 29
10 June 1940	Sqn/Ldr H Eeles	
December 1940	Sqn/Ldr Munro	
February 1941	Sqn/Ldr Arthur Hay Donaldson, DFC, AFC	
August 1941	Sqn/Ldr Thomas P Pugh, DFC	later W/Cmdr with 182 Squadron MIA/KIA 2 August 1943 aged 23
February 1942	Sqn/Ldr Robert S Woodward, DFC	MIA/KIA 7 December 1942 aged 23
11 December 1942	Sqn/Ldr Geoffrey Berrington Warnes, DSO, DFC	
June 1943	Sqn/Ldr Ernest R Baker, DSO, DFC Bar	later W/Cmdr, MIA/KIA 16 June 1944 aged 30
December 1943	Sqn/Ldr Geoffrey Berrington Warnes, DSO, DFC	MIA/KIA 22 February 1944 aged 29
25 February 1944	Sqn/Ldr Henri A C Gonay	formerly of Belgian Air Force, MIA/KIA 14 June 1944 aged 30
June 1944	Sqn/Ldr R D Rutter, DFC	
January 1945 – August 1945	Sqn/Ldr Marten T S Rumbold, DFC Bar	263 Squadron disbanded

Airfields during World War II
Arrival	Airfield
10 June 1940	RAF Drem
28 June 1940	RAF Grangemouth with detachment at RAF Turnhouse
2 September 1940	RAF Drem with detachments at RAF Macmerry and RAF Prestwick
28 November 1940	RAF Exeter with detachment at RAF St Eval
24 February 1941	RAF St Eval
18 March 1941	RAF Portreath
10 April 1941	RAF Filton
7 August 1941	RAF Charmy Down
19 December 1941	RAF Warmwell
23 December 1941	RAF Charmy Down
28 January 1942	RAF Colerne
10 February 1942	RAF Fairwood Common
18 April 1942	RAF Angle with detachment at RAF Portreath
15 August 1942	RAF Colerne, Northern Ireland
13 September 1942	RAF Warmwell with detachments at RAF Predannack and RAF Fairwood Common
20 February 1943	RAF Harrowbeer
15 March 1943	RAF Warmwell
March 1943	RAF Predannack
15 April 1943	RAF Warmwell
19 June 1943	RAF Zeals
12 July 1943	RAF Warmwell
7 September 1943	RAF Manston
10 September 1943	RAF Warmwell
5 December 1943	RAF Ibsley
5 January 1944	RAF Fairwood Common Armament Practice Camp
23 January 1944	RAF Beaulieu
6 March 1944	RAF Warmwell
19 March 1944	RAF Harrowbeer
19 June 1944	RAF Bolt Head
10 July 1944	RAF Hurn
23 July 1944	RAF Eastchurch

== See also ==
- List of Royal Air Force aircraft squadrons
