= No. 275 Squadron RAF =

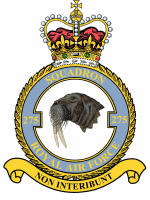
- No. 275 Squadron Badge
- Active: 15 October 1941 – 1 September 1959
- Country: United Kingdom
- Branch: Royal Air Force
- Role: Air-sea rescue
- Mottos: Latin: Non interibunt ("They shall not perish")

Insignia
- Squadron Badge: A walrus' head erased
- Squadron Codes: PV (Oct 1941 – Feb 1945)

No. 275 Squadron RAF was a Royal Air Force air-sea rescue squadron that served between 1941 and 1959.

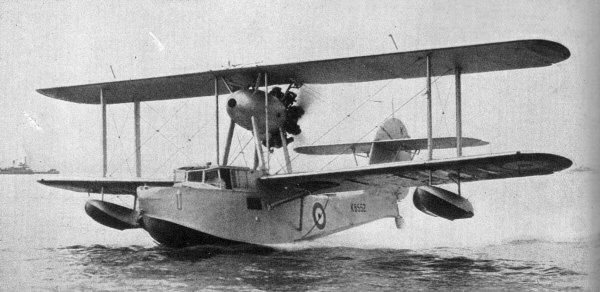
Supermarine Walrus

== History ==
No. 275 Squadron RAF was formed at RAF Valley on 15 October 1941 for air-sea rescue duties in the Irish sea and was 9 Group's Air Sea Rescue Unit. Its first commander was Squadron Leader Ronald Hamlyn.

Following the squadron's formation the first aircraft to be operated were Lysanders Mk.IIIa's. Later in the year Walruses were added to the squadron followed by Defiants, Spitfires and Ansons.

Part of the squadron's operations saw a detachment based at RAF Andreas. The detachment's Walrus amphibian Mk.I's were often to be seen flying around the Isle of Man in addition to which Blackburn Skuas were also operated.

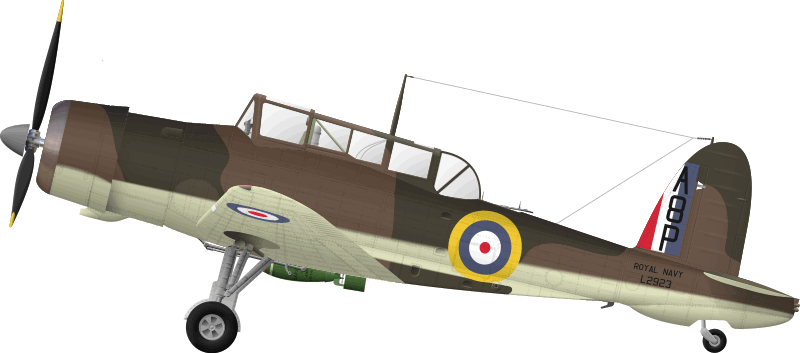
The Blackburn Skua was operated by No. 275 Air Sea Rescue Squadron, which had a detachment based at RAF Andreas from October 1941.

In April 1944 the squadron moved to RAF Warmwell to cover the sea area between England and Normandy. Air-sea rescue missions continued until 15 February 1945 when it was disbanded at RAF Harrowbeer.

No. 275 Squadron was reformed at RAF Linton-on-Ouse as a sea and rescue squadron to provide cover over the North Sea in March 1953 equipped with Sycamore HR.13 and HR.14 helicopters, later relocating to RAF Thornaby on 18 November 1954 and remaining there until October 1957 when the squadron moved to RAF Leconfield. In March 1959 the unit converted to the Whirlwind HAR.4 helicopter, but on 1 September 1959 the squadron was renumbered to No. 228 Squadron RAF and No. 275 ceased to exist.

== Aircraft operated ==
From	To	Aircraft	Version
Oct 1941	Aug 1943	Westland Lysander	Mk.IIIa
Dec 1941	Feb 1945	Supermarine Walrus	Mks.I, II
May 1942	Aug 1943	Boulton Paul Defiant	Mks.I, Ia
Jan 1943	Apr 1943	Supermarine Spitfire	Mk.Vb
Mar 1943	Aug 1944	Avro Anson	Mk.I
Apr 1944	Feb 1945	Supermarine Spitfire	Mk.Vb
Apr 1953	Sep 1959	Bristol Sycamore	HR.13, HR.14
Jan 1954	Aug 1954	Taylorcraft Auster	AOP.5
Feb 1954	May 1955	Hiller	HTE-2
Jul 1954	Mar 1956	de Havilland Canada DHC-1 Chipmunk	T.10
Jul 1954	Sep 1959	Avro Anson	T.21
Mar 1959	Sep 1959	Westland Whirlwind	HAR.2, HAR.4

== Squadron bases ==
From	To	Name	Remark
15 Oct 1941	14 Apr 1944	RAF Valley	Formed here
30 Nov 1941	25 Apr 1944	RAF Andreas	Detachment
30 May 1943	14 Apr 1944	RAF Eglinton	Detachment
14 Apr 1944	7 Aug 1944	RAF Warmwell	
7 Aug 1944	18 Oct 1944	RAF Bolt Head	
7 Aug 1944	15 Feb 1945	RAF Portreath	Detachment
18 Oct 1944	10 Jan 1945	RAF Exeter	
18 Oct 1944	15 Feb 1945	RAF Bolt Head	Detachment
10 Jan 1945	15 Feb 1945	RAF Harrowbeer	Disbanded here
1 Mar 1953	18 Nov 1954	RAF Linton-on-Ouse	Re-formed here
18 Nov 1954	9 Oct 1957	RAF Thornaby	
9 Oct 1957	1 Sep 1959	RAF Leconfield	Disbanded here
