= No. 610 Squadron RAuxAF =

No. 610 (County of Chester) Squadron RAuxAF
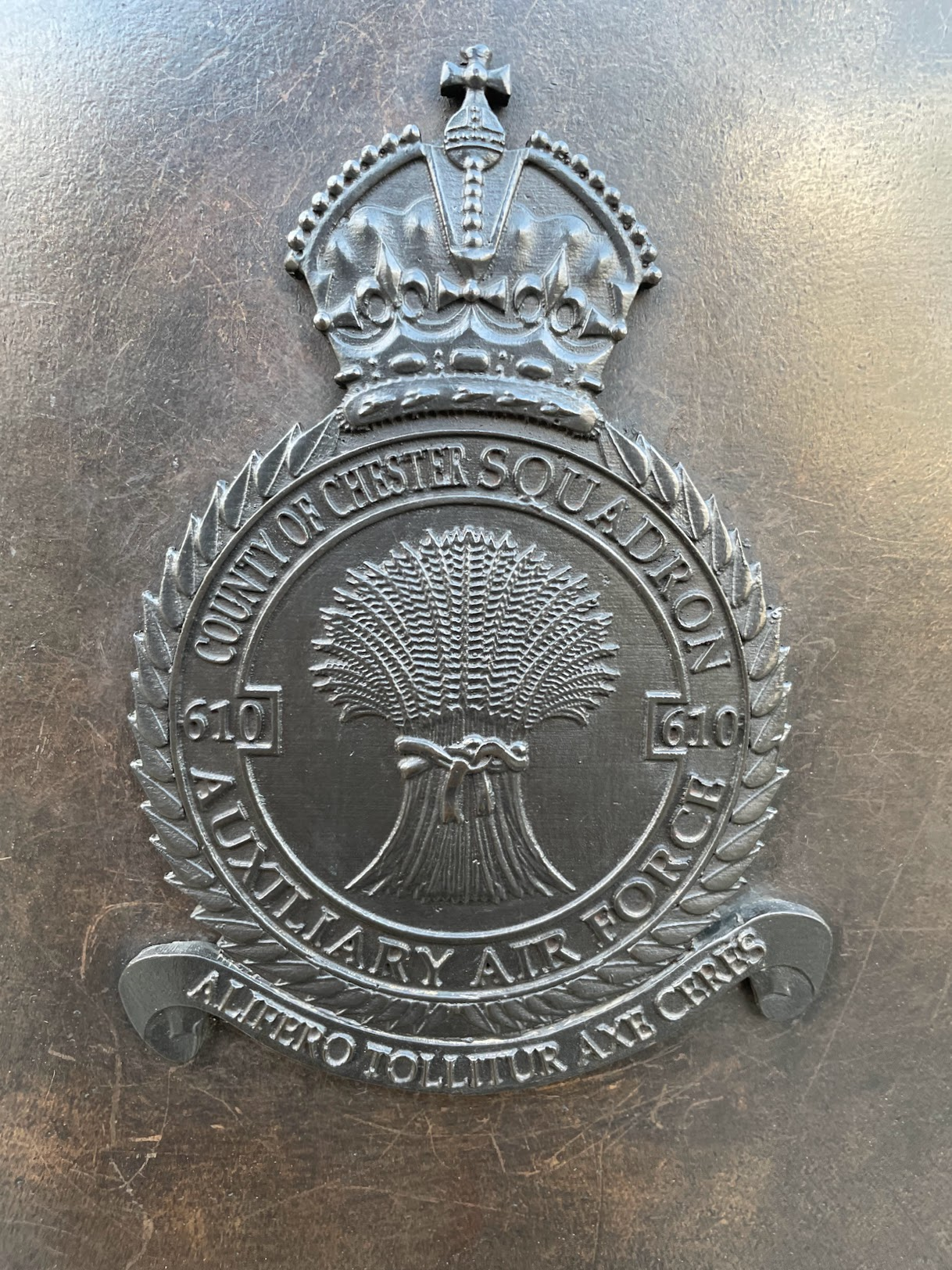
- The heraldic badge of the squadron displayed on the Battle of Britain Monument in London
- Active: 10 February 1936 – 3 March 1945; 10 May 1946 – 10 March 1957
- Country: United Kingdom
- Branch: Royal Air Force
- Part of: Royal Auxiliary Air Force
- Nickname: County of Chester
- Mottos: Latin: Alifero tollitur axe ceres (Translation: "Ceres rising in a winged chariot")
- Engagements: Dunkirk evacuation; Battle of Britain

Commanders
- Honorary Air Commodore: Sir William Bromley-Davenport (1937–49); I.R. Parker (1953–57)
- Notable commanders: Cyril Stanley Bamberger; John Ellis; J.E. "Johnnie" Johnson; Ian Robertson Parker; Andrew Thomas Smith

Insignia
- Squadron Badge heraldry: A garb, divided into two parts and coloured red and blue A wheatsheaf was chosen as such charges appear in the armorial bearings of the city of Chester; No. 610 Squadron was the County of Chester Squadron
- Squadron Codes: JE (April 1939 – September 1939); DW (September 1939 – March 1945, 1949 – April 1951); RAQ (May 1946 – 1949)
- Post-1950 squadron roundel

No. 610 (County of Chester) Squadron of the Royal Air Force was a Squadron of the Auxiliary Air Force. Comprising very high quality pilots, often ex-RAF officers and occasionally locally based company Test pilots from companies such as de Havilland and Airwork, its pilots were initially part timers who would spend their weekends and spare time flying and practising combat manoeuvres. The squadron was named the "County of Chester" and adopted the motto "Alifero tollitur axe ceres"; which translates as "Ceres rising in a winged chariot", Ceres being the Roman Goddess of Wheat, a reference to Chester's Agricultural sector. Its badge contained the image of a garb (sheaf of wheat).

610 Squadron Association, with headquarters at Hooton Park, has a substantial number of ex-members of the Squadron on its list of members.

== History ==
=== Formation and early years ===
The squadron was formed on 10 February 1936 at Hooton Park, Wirral, Cheshire as one of the Auxiliary Air Force Squadrons. It was equipped with Hawker Hart light bombers. As war approached, these were replaced by Hawker Hinds in May 1938. On 1 January 1939 the squadron role was changed to that of a fighter squadron, and on the outbreak of war in September 1939 it received its first Hawker Hurricane fighters. By the end of that same month it was flying the more advanced Supermarine Spitfire fighter.

=== Second World War ===
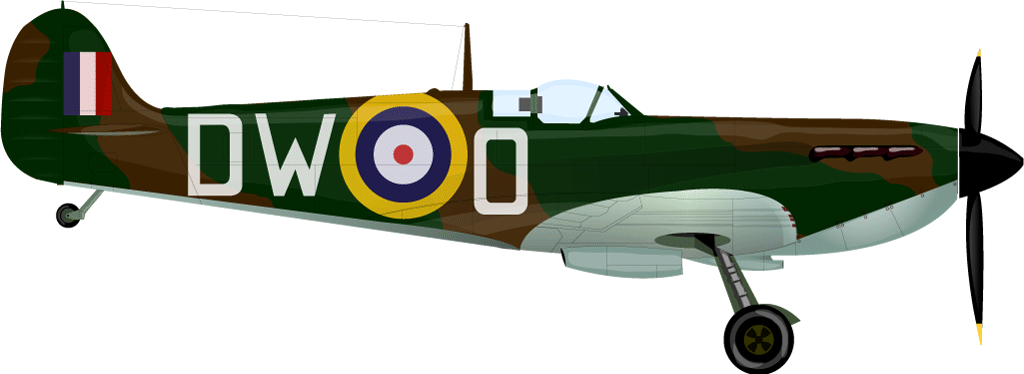
A Spitfire Mk.I in the markings of no. 610 Squadron

610 Squadron gained its first experience of aerial combat against the Luftwaffe whilst desperately attempting to protect the Army and Navy during the Dunkirk evacuation.

It was a very tough few days for 'The Chesters', operating in difficult conditions from RAF Gravesend, against an enemy air force which was a battle-hardened foe. In just four engagements with the enemy, 610 Squadron lost seven pilots Missing or Killed In Action, and one wounded; 610 made claims of ten enemy aircraft destroyed, three unconfirmed destroyed and one damaged, which shows the lethal nature of the dogfights. All of 610's casualties were experienced pilots, but they inevitably lacked any combat experience, which could only be gained during the life or death struggles in the skies over Dunkirk.

During the first two months of the Battle of Britain, 610 Squadron operated out of RAF Biggin Hill as part of 11 Group, where it was one of the units bearing the brunt of German attacks. It moved to RAF Acklington for rest and recuperation at the end of August 1940, having fought heroically but sustained heavy casualties in the process. During the Battle of Britain, 610 Squadron's pilots included Squadron Leader Andrew Thomas Smith AFC, Squadron Leader John Ellis DFC, Flight Lieutenant Edward Brian Bretherton Smith DFC, Flight Lieutenant William Warner, Flying Officer Stanley Norris DFC, Flying Officer Constantine Oliver Joseph Pegge DRC, Sergeant Ronald Hamlyn DFM and Sergeant Horatio Herbert Chandler DFM.

In 1941, 610 Squadron moved south to RAF Westhampnett where it was one of Douglas Bader's three Spitfire squadrons of the Tangmere wing. It remained based in the UK until late 1944 when it moved to the Continent to provide fighter cover as the allies entered Germany. 610 Squadron was disbanded before the end of the war at RAF Warmwell on 3 March 1945.

=== Post-war ===
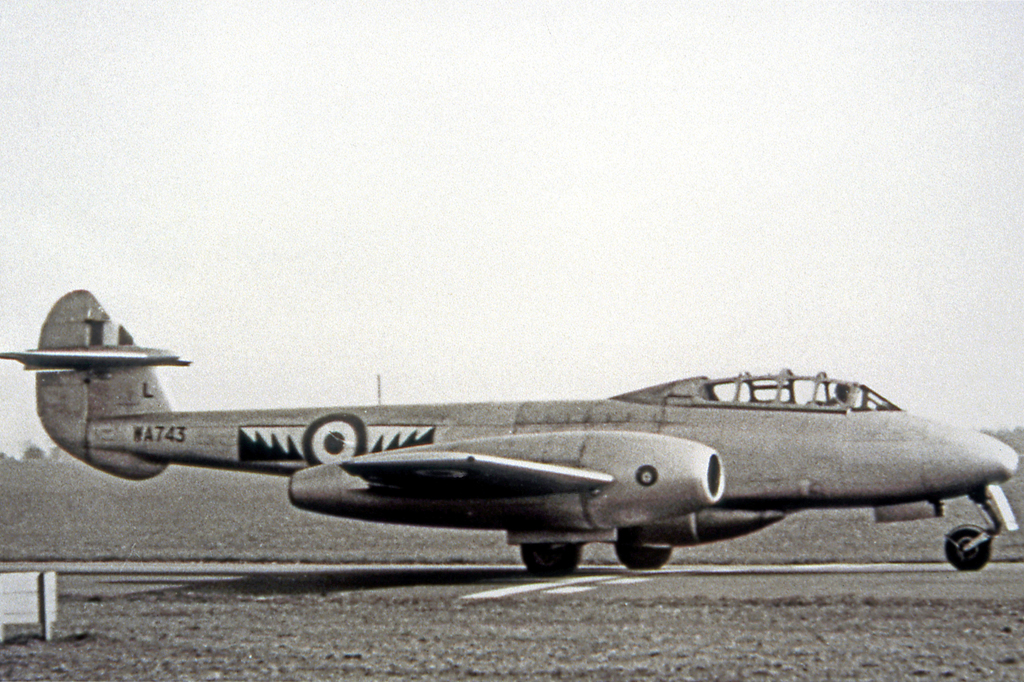
Gloster Meteor T.7 of No. 610 Squadron in 1953 wearing the units black and white zigzag markings.

The squadron was re-formed on 10 May 1946 at RAF Hooton Park as a Royal Auxiliary Air Force fighter squadron, embodied in June of that year and receiving its first Spitfire F.14s in November 1946, switching to more powerful Spitfire F.22s in March 1949. Gloster Meteor F.4 jet fighters were received in July 1951, being replaced by the later F.8 version in March 1952. Meteor T.7 twin-seat training aircraft were also used as advanced conversion trainers. The Meteors were flown until shortly before the squadron disbanded on 10 March 1957, together with all other RAuxAF flying units.

== See also ==
- List of Royal Air Force aircraft squadrons

== Aircraft operated ==
Aircraft operated by No. 610 Squadron RAF, data from
From	To	Aircraft	Version
March 1936	May 1938	Hawker Hart	
May 1938	September 1939	Hawker Hind	
September 1939	September 1939	Hawker Hurricane	Mk.I
September 1939	February 1941	Supermarine Spitfire	Mk.I
February 1941	July 1941	Supermarine Spitfire	Mk.IIa
July 1941	August 1941	Supermarine Spitfire	Mk.Vb
August 1941	November 1941	Supermarine Spitfire	Mks.IIa, IIb
November 1941	March 1944	Supermarine Spitfire	Mks.Vb, Vc
December 1943	March 1945	Supermarine Spitfire	Mk.XIV
November 1946	April 1949	Supermarine Spitfire	F.14
March 1949	August 1951	Supermarine Spitfire	F.22
July 1951	May 1952	Gloster Meteor	F.4
March 1952	February 1957	Gloster Meteor	F.8

== Squadron bases ==
Bases and airfields used by No. 610 Squadron RAF, data from
From	To	Base
10 February 1936	10 October 1939	RAF Hooton Park,
10 October 1939	4 April 1940	RAF Wittering, Cambridgeshire
4 April 1940	10 May 1940	RAF Prestwick, Ayrshire, Scotland
10 May 1940	26 May 1940	RAF Biggin Hill, Kent
26 May 1940	1 June 1940	RAF Gravesend, Kent
1 June 1940	6 June 1940	RAF Acklington, Northumberland
6 June 1940	2 July 1940	RAF Gravesend, Kent
2 July 1940	31 August 1940	RAF Biggin Hill, Kent
31 August 1940	15 December 1940	RAF Acklington, Northumberland
15 December 1940	29 August 1941	RAF Westhampnett, West Sussex
29 August 1941	14 January 1942	RAF Leconfield, Yorkshire
14 January 1942	4 April 1942	RAF Hutton Cranswick, Yorkshire
4 April 1942	16 August 1942	RAF Ludham, Norfolk
16 August 1942	21 August 1942	RAF West Malling, Kent
21 August 1942	15 October 1942	RAF Ludham, Norfolk
15 October 1942	20 January 1943	RAF Castletown, Caithness, Scotland
20 January 1943	30 April 1943	RAF Westhampnett, West Sussex
30 April 1943	26 June 1943	RAF Perranporth, Cornwall
26 June 1943	19 December 1943	RAF Bolt Head, Devon
19 December 1943	4 January 1944	RAF Fairwood Common, Glamorgan, Wales
4 January 1944	7 April 1944	RAF Exeter, Devon
7 April 1944	23 April 1944	RAF Culmhead, Somerset
23 April 1944	30 April 1944	RAF Fairwood Common, Glamorgan, Wales
30 April 1944	16 May 1944	RAF Culmhead, Somerset
16 May 1944	29 May 1944	RAF Bolt Head, Devon
29 May 1944	19 June 1944	RAF Harrowbeer, Devon
19 June 1944	27 June 1944	RAF West Malling, Kent
27 June 1944	2 July 1944	RAF Westhampnett, West Sussex
2 July 1944	12 September 1944	RAF Friston, East Sussex
12 September 1944	4 December 1944	RAF Lympne, Kent
4 December 1944	31 December 1944	B.56/Evere, Belgium
31 December 1944	27 January 1945	Y.32/Ophoven, Belgium
27 January 1945	21 February 1945	B.78/Eindhoven, Netherlands
21 February 1945	3 March 1945	RAF Warmwell, Dorset
10 May 1946	10 March 1957	RAF Hooton Park, Cheshire

== Commanding officers ==
Officers commanding No. 610 Squadron RAF, data from
From	To	Name
10 February 1936	December 1939	S/Ldr. I.R. Parker
January 1940	29 May 1940	S/Ldr. A.L. Franks, AFC
29 May 1940	July 1940	S/Ldr. A.T. Smith
July 1940	April 1941	S/Ldr. J. Ellis, DFC & Bar
April 1941	June 1941	S/Ldr. H. de C.A. Woodhouse, AFC
June 1941	4 November 1941	S/Ldr. K. Holden, DFC
4 November 1941	December 1941	S/Ldr. B.J. Wicks, DFC
December 1941	February 1942	S/Ldr. C.O.J. Pegge, DFC
February 1942	July 1942	S/Ldr. G.S.K. Haywood
July 1942	March 1943	S/Ldr. J.E. Johnson, DFC & Bar
March 1943	January 1944	S/Ldr. W.A Laurie, DFC
January 1944	February 1945	S/Ldr. R.A. 'Dickie' Newbery, DFC & Bar
February 1945	March 1945	F/Lt. J.B. Shepherd
June 1946	March 1948	S/Ldr. P.G. Lamb, AFC
March 1948	1950	S/Ldr. R.D. Graesser
1950	1952	S/Ldr. C.S. Bamberger, DFC & Bar
1952	1954	S/Ldr. H.C. Rigby
1954	10 March 1957	S/Ldr. J.E. Storrar, DFC & Bar, AFC
