= Roborough Rock =

Coordinates: 50.4854°N 4.0938°W

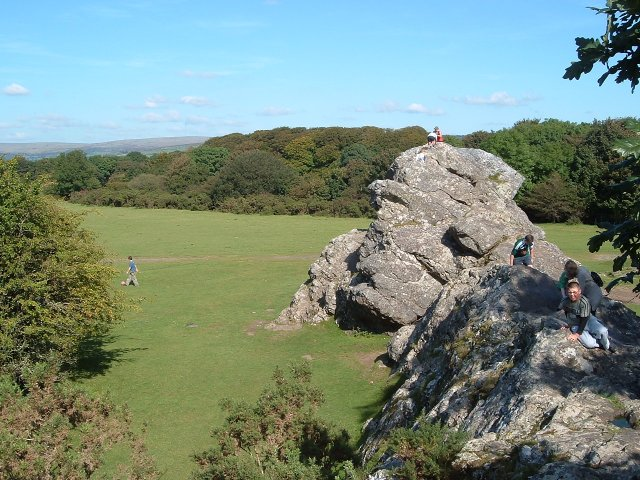
Roborough Rock

Yelverton Rock (also known as The Rock) is a tor-like igneous rock outcrop immediately south-west of Yelverton, Devon. It is located at the southern end of the former RAF Harrowbeer airfield on Roborough Down, next to the border with the A386. This location created problems for the airfield during the Second World War, as two runways were positioned in front of the rock.

== Names ==
The Rock has been given many names, particularly due to the resemblance of a human face apparent when viewing the eastern mass from the north. This has variously been referred to as the "Duke of Wellington's Nose" and "George III's nose". On Dunn's 18th-century map of Dartmoor, it is labelled as Ullestor Rock or Ulster Rock, but this label was rare by the mid-19th century. Donne's map of 1765 labelled it "Hurstone Rock". In the 16th century, it was known as Udell Torre and it has also been referred to as Udal Tor. Often it is locally referred to as just "The Rock". It has also been called "Yelverton Rock".

== Geology ==
Roborough Rock has two high ends and a lower middle section. The height was historically more uniform, until the middle section was removed for road maintenance in 1830.
