= RAF Hope Cove =

RAF Hope Cove
- Salcombe, Devon in England

Site information
- Type: Royal Air Force station
- Owner: Home Office

Location
- Shown within Devon RAF Hope Cove (the United Kingdom)
- Coordinates: 50.224898°N 3.798460°W

Site history
- Built: 1941
- In use: 1941-1945
- Battles/wars: European Theatre of World War II

Royal Air Force Hope Cove or more simply RAF Hope Cove is a former Royal Air Force radar station. It is located about 1 mile (1.6 km) south west of Salcombe on the south Devon coast, England, co-located with the former RAF Bolt Head airstrip, which was the RAF closed in 1945 but remains in service for general aviation to this day.

Hope Cove was originally built in 1941 to host an AMES Type 7 ground control interception (GCI) station. In the 1950s it joined the ROTOR network and was upgraded with an AMES Type 80 radar. It was one of six Type 80 stations that featured a R6 bunker, which was semi-sunken.

When the GCI role was moved to the new Master Radar Stations, the bunker was made redundant and taken over by the Home Office as a regional seat of government (RSG) bunker. Plans to move this station to Norton Manor Camp were never carried out, and it remained in use as a RSG (although the name changed on occasion) until 1994 with the ending of the Cold War.

The bunker is currently a Grade II Listed Building.

== Bibliography ==
- Howell, Christopher (2009) RAF Bolt Head (privately published, no ISBN)
- Samuels, Linda Nissen (2022) The Man Under The Radar - A Biography of Jack Nissenthall (Chiselbury Publishing, ISBN 978-1-908291-84-4)
