= Warmwell =

Village and civil parish in Dorset, England

Coordinates: 50.6904°N 2.3409°W

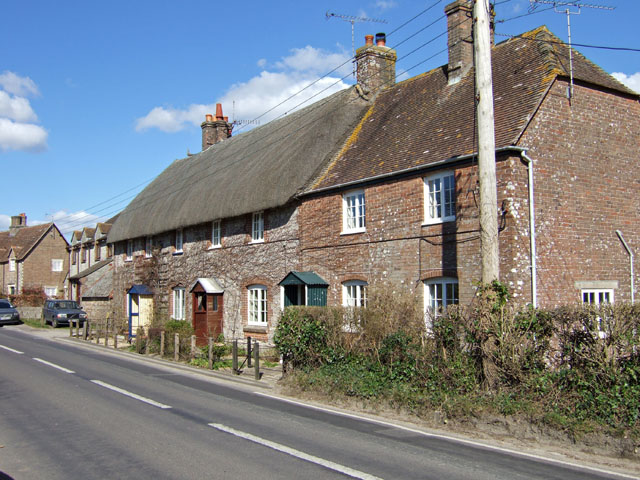
- Warmwell

- Location within Dorset
- Population: 80
- OS grid reference: SY753858
- Unitary authority: Dorset
- Ceremonial county: Dorset
- Region: South West
- Country: England
- Sovereign state: United Kingdom
- Post town: Dorchester
- Postcode district: DT2
- Police: Dorset
- Fire: Dorset and Wiltshire
- Ambulance: South Western
- UK Parliament: South Dorset

Warmwell is a small village and civil parish in south west Dorset, England, situated on the B3390 road about 5 miles (8.0 km) southeast of Dorchester. In 2013 the estimated population of the parish was 80.

Warmwell contains several historic buildings, including a Jacobean manor house, and from May 1937 was the home of RAF Station Woodsford airfield (later renamed RAF Warmwell), which is now a popular holiday site and contains a caravan park and several other small businesses.

On the outskirts of the village is Warmwell Holiday Park, operated by Parkdean Resorts. It was established in its current form in 1987, when the owners of the Warmwell Holiday Village Touring and Camping Park erected 177 timber lodges and guest facilities. It opened under the name Warmwell Leisure Resort in 1988, with facilities including an indoor swimming pool (with wave machine and flume), all-weather ski slope, fishing lake, licensed family club house and sports hall.

== Notable people ==
- Frederick Octavius Pickard-Cambridge (1860–1905) arachnologist
