= Crossways, Dorset =

Village and civil parish in Dorset, England

Coordinates: 50.695°N 2.328°W

Crossways
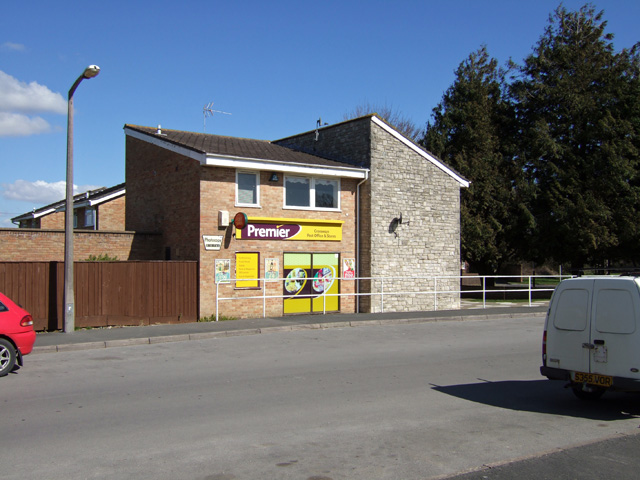
- Crossways post office and general store

- Location within Dorset
- Population: 2,267
- OS grid reference: SY768885
- Unitary authority: Dorset
- Ceremonial county: Dorset
- Region: South West
- Country: England
- Sovereign state: United Kingdom
- Post town: Dorchester
- Postcode district: DT2
- Police: Dorset
- Fire: Dorset and Wiltshire
- Ambulance: South Western
- UK Parliament: South Dorset

Crossways is a village and civil parish in the English county of Dorset. It lies 6 miles (9.7 km) east of the county town Dorchester. In the 2011 census the parish had a population of 2,267.

In the early 1930s Crossways was a hamlet of scattered bungalows and cottages. At that time the Air Ministry acquired local heath and farmland to build an airfield. This airfield was completed in 1937 and was known briefly as RAF Woodsford, although it was renamed RAF Warmwell a year later. RAF Warmwell played an important part in World War II, being a major fighter station during the Battle of Britain, and offering fighter protection for Portland Naval Base and other important south coast areas. The village has been used for filming on many occasions.

During the following years, the runways and operational areas disappeared as a result of the extraction of valuable sand and gravel by mineral companies, however the influence of the airfield can still be seen today. The village hall used to have a multi-functional role, being used by the airmen for recreational use - cinema, gymnasium and NAAFI - but also was used on occasions as a morgue. It is in use constantly to this day. Much of the present village of Crossways is built on the eastern part of the former airfield site.

In the early 1970s the local government authority for the area decided to build blocks of flats, houses and bungalows at Crossways to provide much-needed accommodation for displaced families in the area, and to fulfill a growing need for housing at the time. This resulted in a very rapid expansion in the size of the community. There is a thriving business park nearby and a new school opened in September 2006.
