= Yelverton, Devon =

Village in Devon, England

Coordinates: 50.492°N 4.086°W

Yelverton
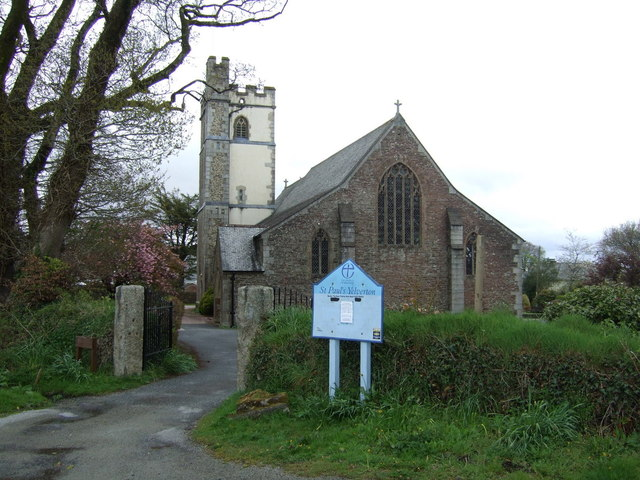
- St Pauls Church, Yelverton

- Location within Devon
- Population: 3,493
- OS grid reference: SX5267
- Civil parish: Buckland Monachorum
- District: West Devon
- Shire county: Devon
- Region: South West
- Country: England
- Sovereign state: United Kingdom
- Post town: YELVERTON
- Postcode district: PL20
- Dialling code: 01822
- Police: Devon and Cornwall
- Fire: Devon and Somerset
- Ambulance: South Western
- UK Parliament: South West Devon

Yelverton is a large village on the south-western edge of Dartmoor, Devon, in England. It is in the civil parish of Buckland Monachorum. According to the 2021 census, it had a population of 1,858, which was slightly more than the 1,810 recorded at the 2011 census.

When Yelverton railway station (on the Great Western Railway (GWR) line from Plymouth to Tavistock) opened in the 19th century, the village became a popular residence for Plymouth commuters. The railway is now closed, but the Plym Valley Railway has reopened a section of it.

The Anglican parish church of St Paul was built in 1910-1912 and is a grade II listed building. Yelverton is one of six parishes which form the West Dartmoor Mission Community, within the Tavistock Deanery of the Diocese of Exeter. Holy Cross Catholic Church was built as a chapel in the early 1920s and upgraded to a church in 1928. It is in the Roman Catholic Diocese of Plymouth, and is built in a "simplified Gothic style". Rock Methodist Church is also in Yelverton.

Yelverton is well known for Roborough Rock - a prominent mass of stone close to the Plymouth road on the fringe of nearby Roborough Down, near the southern end of the airfield. It gave its name to the Rock Hotel, built as a farm during the Elizabethan period, but converted in the 1850s to cater for growing tourism in the area. The area to the south and west of the roundabout at the centre of the village was settled in late Victorian and Edwardian times, with many grand and opulent villas. An area developed at about the same time on an odd shaped piece of land to the south of the Tavistock road is known as Leg o' Mutton Corner.

At the beginning of the Second World War, an airfield (RAF Harrowbeer) was constructed at adjacent Harrowbeer as a fighter station for the air defence of Devonport Dockyard and the Western Approaches. A 19th century terrace of houses, now mostly converted into shops, had to have its upper storey removed to provide an easier approach. One tall building which was not altered was St. Paul's Church, but the tower was hit by a plane, resulting in a warning light being fitted. The layout of the runways is still very clear and although they are substantially grassed over, the many earth and brick protective bunkers built to protect the fighters from attack on the ground are all still in place. Some American airmen and anti-aircraft battery units were stationed here during the second half of the war. A plane carrying President Truman landed here when its original destination was fogbound.

To the south of the village is Langton Park, home of Yelverton Bohemians Cricket Club, and about 0.5 km south is Moorland Garden Hotel, serving Yelverton Golf Club, where most of the holes run well down the open moorland to the east. There are several bed-and-breakfasts in Yelverton, serving the many walkers and visitors to National Trust properties in the area.

== Notable people ==
- Former Sadlers Wells Ballet star Maureen Bruce lives in Yelverton.
- General Sir Frank Kitson lived in Yelverton after retiring from the Army.
- Seth Lakeman, the Mercury Music Prize nominee, comes from Yelverton.
- The present Ravenscroft Care Home was built as a private house but in the 1930s became Ravenscroft School and during the Second World War was the officers' mess of RAF Harrowbeer.

== Transport ==
=== Rail ===
Yelverton used to have a railway station built in the 19th century. The line ran to Tavistock and Plymouth, but has closed.

=== Road ===
Yelverton sits on the A386, which runs to Tavistock and Okehampton in the north and Plymouth in the south.

=== Bus Services ===
Yelverton is served by Stagecoach's service 1 between Tavistock and Plymouth. It also has Plymouth Citybus running a rural service towards Dartmoor.

=== Coach Services ===
Lomax Tours run coach excursions throughout the year from Yelverton to places of interest such as Bath Christmas Market, Lyme Regis, RHS Rosemoor flower shows etc.
