= Cyril Stanley Bamberger =

British RAF pilot (1919–2008)

- Born: 4 May 1919; Hyde, Cheshire
- Died: 3 February 2008 (aged 88); Hampshire
- Military career
- Allegiance: United Kingdom
- Branch: Royal Air Force
- Service years: 1936–1959
- Rank: Squadron Leader
- Nickname: Bam
- Service number: 810024 (airman); 116515 (officer)
- Units: No. 41 Squadron RAF; No. 261 Squadron RAF; No. 93 Squadron RAF
- Commands: No. 610 (County of Chester) Squadron (1950–52)
- Conflicts: Second World War; Battle of Britain; Siege of Malta; Allied invasion of Sicily; Korean War; Aden Emergency
- Awards: Distinguished Flying Cross & Bar; Air Efficiency Award
- Other work: Guinness Management; Founder of a packaging materials Company; Antiques Business

Cyril Stanley "Bam" Bamberger, DFC & Bar, AE (4 May 1919 – 3 February 2008) was a Royal Air Force pilot who fought in the Battle of Britain, the defence of Malta and the Korean War.

== Early life ==
Cyril Stanley Bamberger was born in Hyde, Cheshire, and educated locally. He left school in 1934, aged 14, and joined Lever Brothers as an electrical apprentice.

In 1936, Bamberger volunteered for the Auxiliary Air Force and was posted to one of its bomber squadrons, No. 610 (County of Chester) Squadron, as a photographer. He was accepted for pilot training with the Royal Air Force Volunteer Reserve (RAFVR) in 1938 (Service No. 810024).

== Second World War ==
Bamberger was called to full-time service on the outbreak of war, completed his training and rejoined his former squadron, now equipped with Supermarine Spitfire fighters, at Biggin Hill on 27 July 1940, as a sergeant pilot. Bamberger flew with No. 610 Squadron during the early air fighting over the Channel that followed the Dunkirk evacuation. The squadron suffered heavy casualties but Bamberger was credited with the probably destruction of a Messerschmitt Bf 109 fighter on 28 August in combat off the Kent coast.

When No. 610 Squadron was withdrawn to rest in mid-September 1940, Bamberger was posted to No. 41 Squadron at Hornchurch and was soon back in action in the Battle of Britain. He was credited with his first confirmed aerial victory, again a Bf 109, over Canterbury on 5 October.

With the Battle of Britain winding down, Bamberger volunteered for Malta. He flew Hawker Hurricane fighters with No. 261 Squadron from Hal Far from late November 1940 and was credited with shooting down two Junkers Ju 87 dive bombers over Grand Harbour in January 1941.

Bamberger joined No. 93 Squadron in 1942 and was deployed to Tunisia. He was commissioned as pilot officer on 9 February 1942 and promoted to flying officer on 1 October 1942. With the same squadron, he returned to Malta in 1943 and was credited with another aerial victory, a Ju 87, on 13 July, this time over Sicily.

Bamberger was awarded the Distinguished Flying Cross (DFC) which was gazetted on 28 September 1943. Promoted to flight lieutenant on 9 February 1944, he returned to the United Kingdom in July. Four months later he was awarded a Bar to his DFC.

== Postwar career ==
Bamberger was released from RAF service in 1946 and he returned to Lever before joining the management of a Guinness subsidiary.

When No. 610 Squadron RAF was reformed as a Royal Auxiliary Air Force unit, Bamberger rejoined it as a flight commander and was given the rank of flight lieutenant. In 1950 he became the squadron's Commanding Officer, having converted to Gloster Meteor aircraft. After the outbreak of the Korean War Bamberger accepted a permanent RAF commission, and for most of the duration of that conflict was an intelligence officer at the Air Ministry. He was promoted to squadron leader on 1 January 1957.

Bamberger later converted to flying helicopters and flew the Bristol Sycamore aircraft in Aden. He retired in 1959, after being awarded the Air Efficiency Award with clasp.

== Later life ==
After retiring from the RAF in 1959, Bamberger went into business, founding a packaging materials company. He later ran an antiques business in Hampshire. He remained active in RAF matters and was closely involved with the Bentley Priory Battle of Britain Trust, of which he was vice-chairman.

Bamberger died on 3 February 2008, aged 88. He was survived by his wife Heather, whom he married in 1954, and by three sons and a daughter. It was Bam's granddaughter who presented the Duchess of Cornwall with a posy at the unveiling of the Battle of Britain Monument in London on 18 September 2005. A Spitfire of No. 610 Squadron as it appeared when Bamberger flew it is displayed at Bentley Priory.

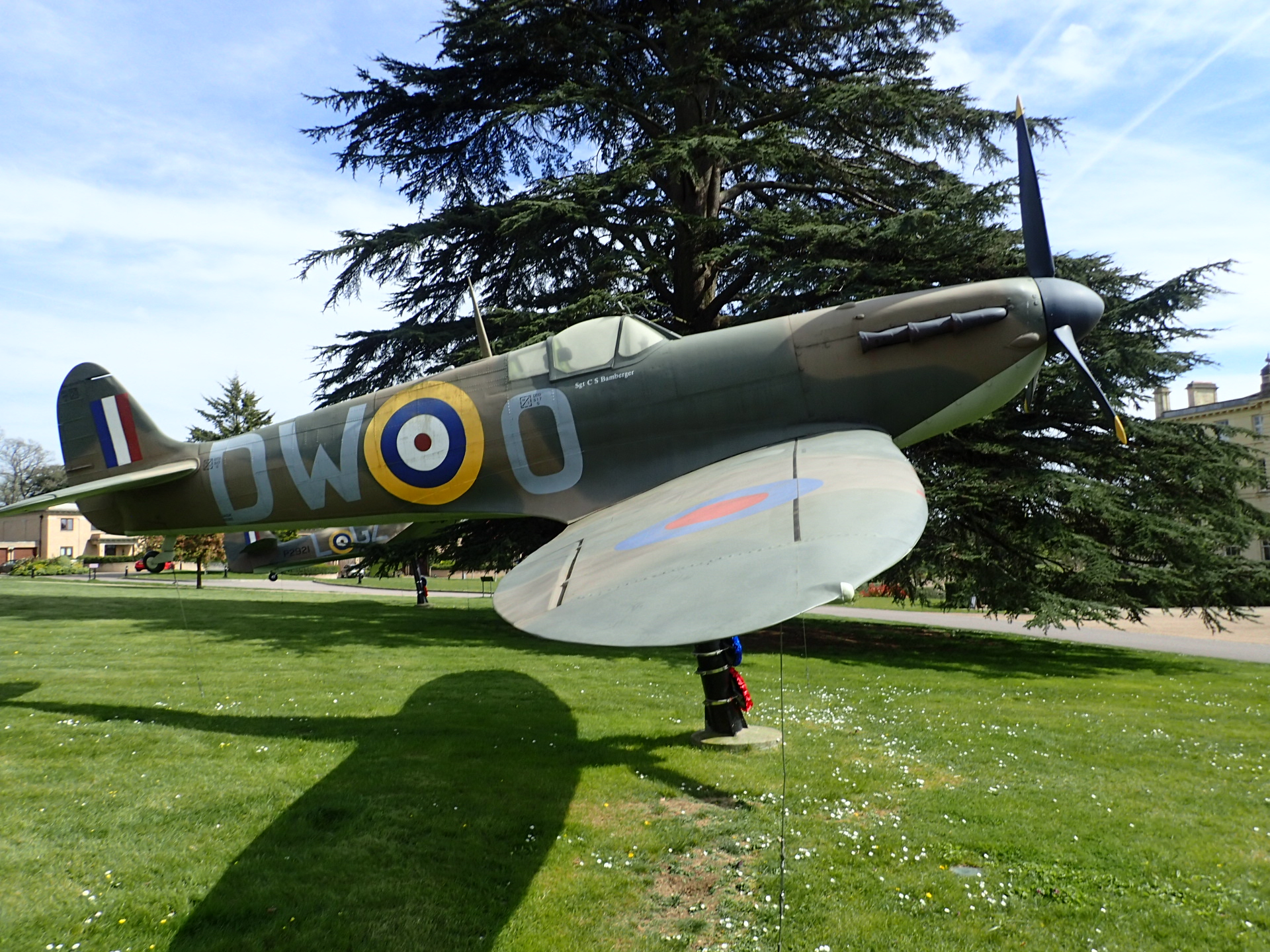
Bamberger's Spitfire at Bentley Priory
