= Frederick Octavius Pickard-Cambridge =

English arachnologist

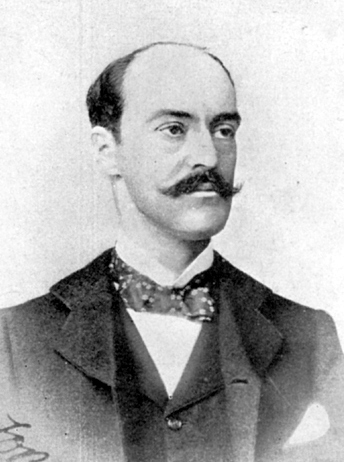
- Born: 3 November 1860; Warmwell, Dorset
- Died: 9 February 1905 (aged 44)
- Education: Sherborne and Oxford
- Occupations: Clergyman, illustrator, naturalist

Frederick Octavius Pickard-Cambridge (3 November 1860 – 9 February 1905) was an English arachnologist. He is sometimes confused with his uncle, Octavius Pickard-Cambridge (1828–1917), who was also an arachnologist and from whom F. O. Pickard-Cambridge picked up his enthusiasm for the study of spiders.

== Life ==
F. O. Pickard-Cambridge was born in Warmwell, Dorset, where his father was rector. He became a curate at St Cuthbert's church in Carlisle for a few years after having been educated at Sherborne School and Exeter College, Oxford. He left to become a professional biological illustrator, and in 1894–1895 spent several months in the Amazon as a naturalist on board the SS Faraday. He found much of interest on his voyage and began writing papers in 1896 to describe the spiders he discovered.

He had a promising career ahead of him, but this promise was not to be fulfilled. Bristowe, writing in the book British Spiders, 1951, said of this time in F. O. Pickard-Cambridge's life: "Whilst he was still in his 30s, however, a marked change came over him which led to misfortune". He gave up the priesthood because of his extreme religious views, and became estranged from friends and family on account of his strong political opinions. This unfortunate new tendency also spilled over into his natural history work, and he had fierce arguments with other scientists, such as Karsch, over questions of nomenclature.

== Work ==
F. O. Pickard-Cambridge's papers were published between 1889 and 1905, some posthumously. He worked on spiders from across the world, not just British ones, and as opposed to being a collector was more concerned with the study of specimens in reference collections and papers – work which was often passed over in previous decades when many new discoveries were being made by explorers and collectors. His work was largely taxonomic, consisting of a re-examination of the relationships between various species, including many described by his celebrated uncle. For example, he discovered several species which had been described more than once and so had more than one name, or, by contrast, more than one species which had only one name. He created several new genera and added sixteen species of spider to the British list.

His cousin Sir Arthur Pickard-Cambridge, said of him in 1918:

[He] was a born naturalist and a very clever and artistic draughtsman, and was capable of very rapid and effective work, sometimes, indeed, too rapid, and marred by hasty conclusions and a tendency to treat the latest idea as if it were a new gospel, but almost always useful and suggestive; moreover, as a companion he was full of fun and resource. The extreme political and moral ideas which he felt it his duty to preach somewhat indiscriminately in the later years of his life ultimately brought about a partial severance between him and my father [O. Pickard-Cambridge], but his early death was undoubtedly a loss to science as well as to those who had delighted in his companionship. His papers, chiefly on foreign Arachnida, showed great ability, and it was he who undertook so much of the treatment of the Araneidea for the Biologia Centrali-Americana as my father could not complete by himself.

Later in his career he used his considerable skill as an illustrator to illustrate many books and papers on natural history and other subjects.

== Death ==
Hillyard says of F. O. Pickard-Cambridge's death "Fredrick Pickard-Cambridge is the only well-known spider specialist to have committed suicide with his own gun". He goes on to quote The Times from 1905 (no date given) which reported that no cause other than mental strain could be assigned for the act, and that a verdict of "Suicide while temporarily insane" was returned at the inquest.

His death is noted in The Times obituaries column, and dated to 9 February 1905. Hillyard confirms the date 1905 and Bristowe, writing in Locket & Millidge 1951, gives his dates as 1860–1905. (In Bristowe's own book The World of Spiders he writes erroneously that F. O. Pickard-Cambridge's papers were published "between 1889 and 1905 (three years after his untimely death)".)

In the Proceedings of the Royal Society of London F. O. Pickard-Cambridge was described as "a very able naturalist too early lost to science". Hillyard speculated that "almost certainly he would have followed Reginald Innes Pocock in the position of arachnologist at the British Museum."
