= RAF Warmwell =

Former Royal Air Force station in Dorset, England

RAF Warmwell USAAF Station AAF-454 RAF Woodsford
- Near Warmwell, Dorset in England
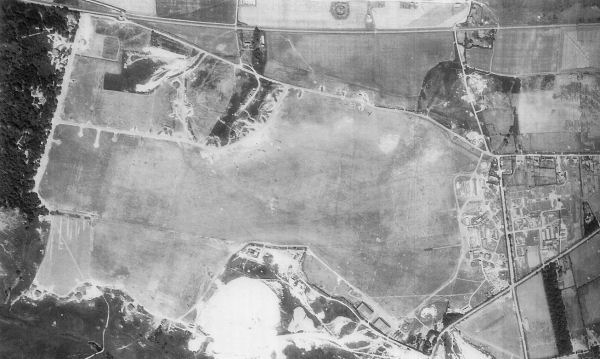
- Aerial Photo of Warmwell Airfield - 16 August 1943

Site information
- Type: Royal Air Force satellite station
- Code: XW
- Owner: Air Ministry
- Operator: Royal Air Force; United States Army Air Forces
- Controlled by: RAF Flying Training Command; 1937-40; RAF Fighter Command; 1940-44 & 1944- * No. 10 Group RAF; Ninth Air Force; 1944

Location
- Shown within Dorset RAF Warmwell (the United Kingdom)
- Coordinates: 50°41′50″N 002°20′40″W

Site history
- Built: 1936/37
- In use: May 1937 - November 1945
- Battles/wars: European theatre of World War II

Airfield information
- Elevation: 207 feet (63 m) AMSL
Runways
Direction	Length and surface
00/00	Grass
00/00	Grass
00/00	Grass

Royal Air Force Warmwell, or more simply RAF Warmwell, is a former Royal Air Force station near Warmwell in Dorset, England from 1937 to 1946, located about 5 miles east-southeast of Dorchester.

During the Second World War it was used by the Royal Air Force and the United States Army Air Forces Ninth Air Force.

== History ==
=== RAF use ===
At 206 feet (63 m) above sea level, RAF Warmwell originally opened in May 1937 as a landing ground named RAF Woodsford, for units carrying out air-to-ground firing and bombing on ranges set up off the south coast of Dorset at Chesil Bank. With the airfield code of 'XW' it was renamed RAF Warmwell in July 1938 due to possible confusion with Woodford, near Manchester, which was an airfield where Avro was producing the Lancaster bomber. After the use by squadrons using the ranges diminished, and as the Second World War started, more and more units were based at Warmwell. They acted as fighter defence for the important naval facilities at Portland and Portsmouth, as well as working in 10 Group as part of the fighter defences for the south-west of England. Warmwell's three runways remained grass-surfaced for its entire life even though as the war progressed, and the emphasis became on intruding into German-occupied Europe, many intruder units were based here. These units used the Supermarine Spitfire, Hawker Hurricane and Tempest, and the Westland Whirlwind, the first twin-engined heavy fighter for the RAF.

- Air Sea Rescue Flight RAF, Warmwell (1941) became No. 276 Squadron RAF

The following units were also here at some point:

- No. 2 Squadron RAF
- No. 3 Squadron RAF
- No. 13 Squadron RAF
- No. 19 Squadron RAF
- No. 26 (South African) Squadron RAF
- No. 41 Squadron RAF
- No. 56 Squadron RAF
- No. 63 Squadron RAF
- No. 66 Squadron RAF
- No. 79 (Madras Presidency) Squadron RAF
- No. 80 Squadron RAF
- No. 118 Squadron RAF
- No. 130 (Punjab) Squadron RAF
- No. 137 Squadron RAF
- No. 152 (Hyderabad) Squadron RAF
- No. 164 (Argentine–British) Squadron RAF
- No. 174 (Mauritius) Squadron RAF
- No. 175 Squadron RAF
- No. 181 Squadron RAF
- No. 182 Squadron RAF
- No. 184 Squadron RAF
- No. 217 Squadron RAF
- No. 225 Squadron RAF
- No. 234 (Madras Presidency) Squadron RAF
- No. 238 Squadron RAF
- No. 245 (Northern Rhodesian) Squadron RAF
- No. 247 (China-British) Squadron RAF
- No. 257 (Burma) Squadron RAF
- No. 263 (Fellowship of the Bellows) Squadron RAF
- No. 266 (Rhodesia) Squadron RAF
- No. 274 Squadron RAF
- No. 275 Squadron RAF
- No. 276 Squadron RAF
- No. 277 Squadron RAF
- No. 286 Squadron RAF
- No. 302 Polish Fighter Squadron
- No. 310 (Czechoslovak) Squadron RAF
- No. 312 (Czechoslovak) Squadron RAF
- No. 313 (Czechoslovak) Squadron RAF
- No. 340 (GC IV/2 Île-de-France) Squadron RAF
- No. 350 (Belgian) Squadron RAF
- No. 401 Squadron RCAF
- No. 402 Squadron RCAF
- No. 403 Squadron RCAF
- No. 411 Squadron RCAF
- No. 412 Squadron RCAF
- No. 414 Squadron RCAF
- No. 416 Squadron RCAF
- No. 421 Squadron RCAF
- No. 430 Squadron RCAF
- No. 438 Squadron RCAF
- No. 439 Squadron RCAF
- No. 440 Squadron RCAF
- No. 442 Squadron RCAF
- No. 443 Squadron RCAF
- No. 500 (County of Kent) Squadron AAF
- No. 501 (County of Gloucester) Squadron AAF
- No. 604 (County of Middlesex) Squadron AAF
- No. 609 (West Riding) Squadron AAF
- No. 610 (County of Chester) Squadron AAF
- 793 Naval Air Squadron
- 794 Naval Air Squadron
- 810 Naval Air Squadron
- 814 Naval Air Squadron

Units

- No. 2 Air Observers School RAF
- No. 6 Armament Training Camp RAF
- No. 6 Armament Training Station RAF
- No. 6 Fighter Command Servicing Unit
- No. 6 Flying Training School RAF
- No. 6 Service Flying Training School RAF
- No. 8 Anti-Aircraft Co-operation Unit RAF
- No. 9 Service Flying Training School RAF
- No. 10 Air Observers School RAF
- No. 10 Bombing and Gunnery School RAF
- No. 10 Group Target Towing Flight RAF
- No. 14 Armament Practice Camp RAF
- No. 17 Armament Practice Camp RAF
- No. 1487 (Fighter) Gunnery Flight RAF
- No. 1487 (Target Towing) Flight RAF
- No. 2714 Squadron RAF Regiment
- No. 2768 Squadron RAF Regiment
- No. 2772 Squadron RAF Regiment
- No. 2824 Squadron RAF Regiment
- No. 2954 Squadron RAF Regiment
- Central Gunnery School RAF

=== USAAF use ===
Although USAAF-marked aircraft were seen at Warmwell from July 1942, it was not until March 1944 that the base came under American control. While under USAAF control, Warmwell was known as USAAF Station AAF-454 for security reasons, and by which it was referred to instead of location.

==== 474th Fighter Group ====
The 474th Fighter Group arrived on 12 March 1944 from Oxnard Flight Strip in California, flying Lockheed P-38 Lightnings. Operational squadrons of the group were:

- 428th Fighter Squadron (F5)
- 429th Fighter Squadron (7Y)
- 430th Fighter Squadron (K6)

=== Resumed RAF use ===
The 474th was a group of Ninth Air Force's 70th Fighter Wing, IX Tactical Air Command, which left for continental Europe in August 1944. The RAF once more assumed control of the airfield. After the last RAF squadrons to be based there left, and Armament Practice Camps stopped using the ranges by October 1945, the station went onto Care and Maintenance the following month before closing down. During the immediate post-war years the hangars were used for food storage. This was not quite the end for the airfield, for during the extensive test programme for the Westland Wyvern, company test pilot Harald Penrose had to make a forced landing on the obstructed and overgrown surface.

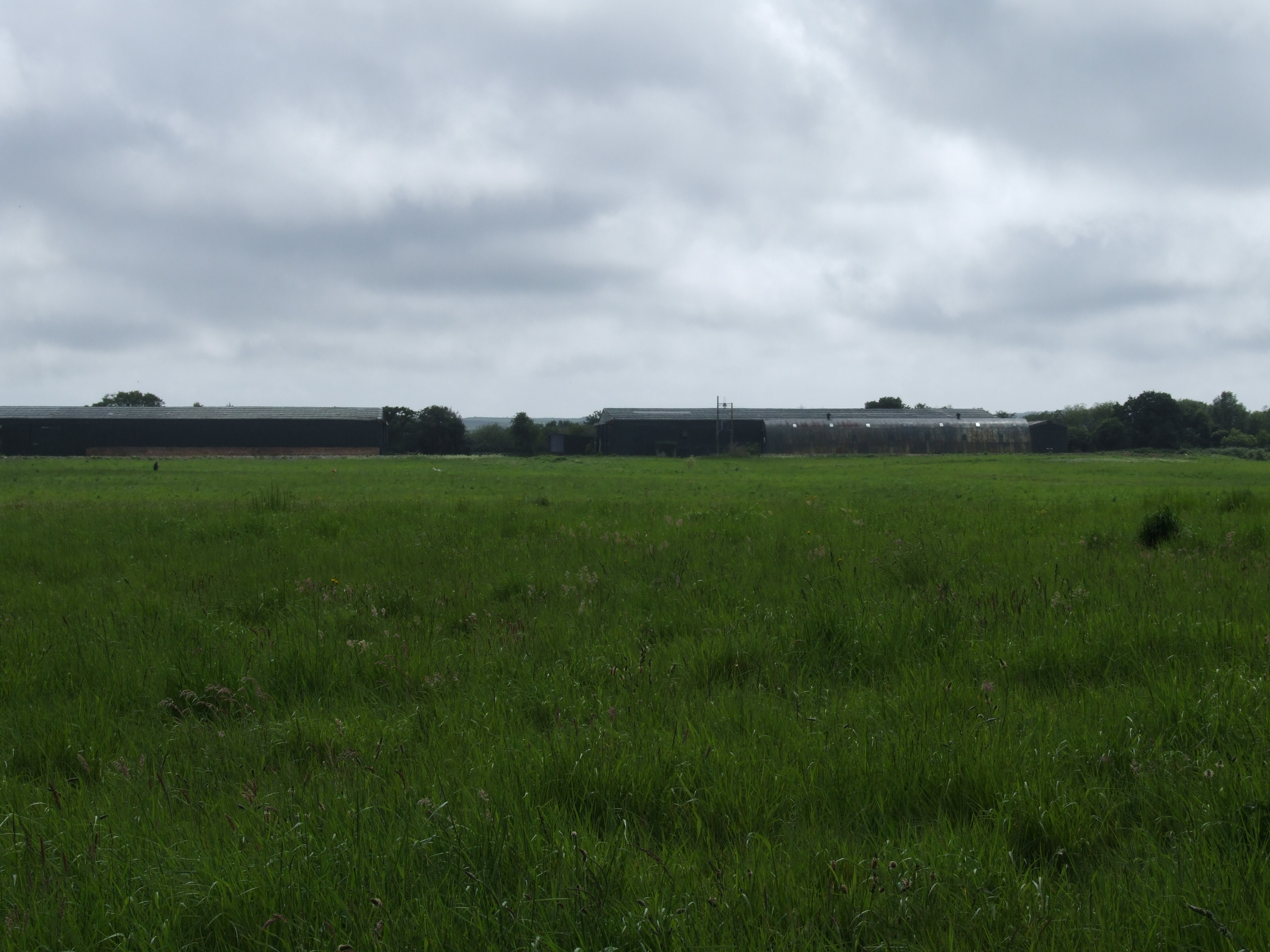
Bellman Hangars Warmwell 2007

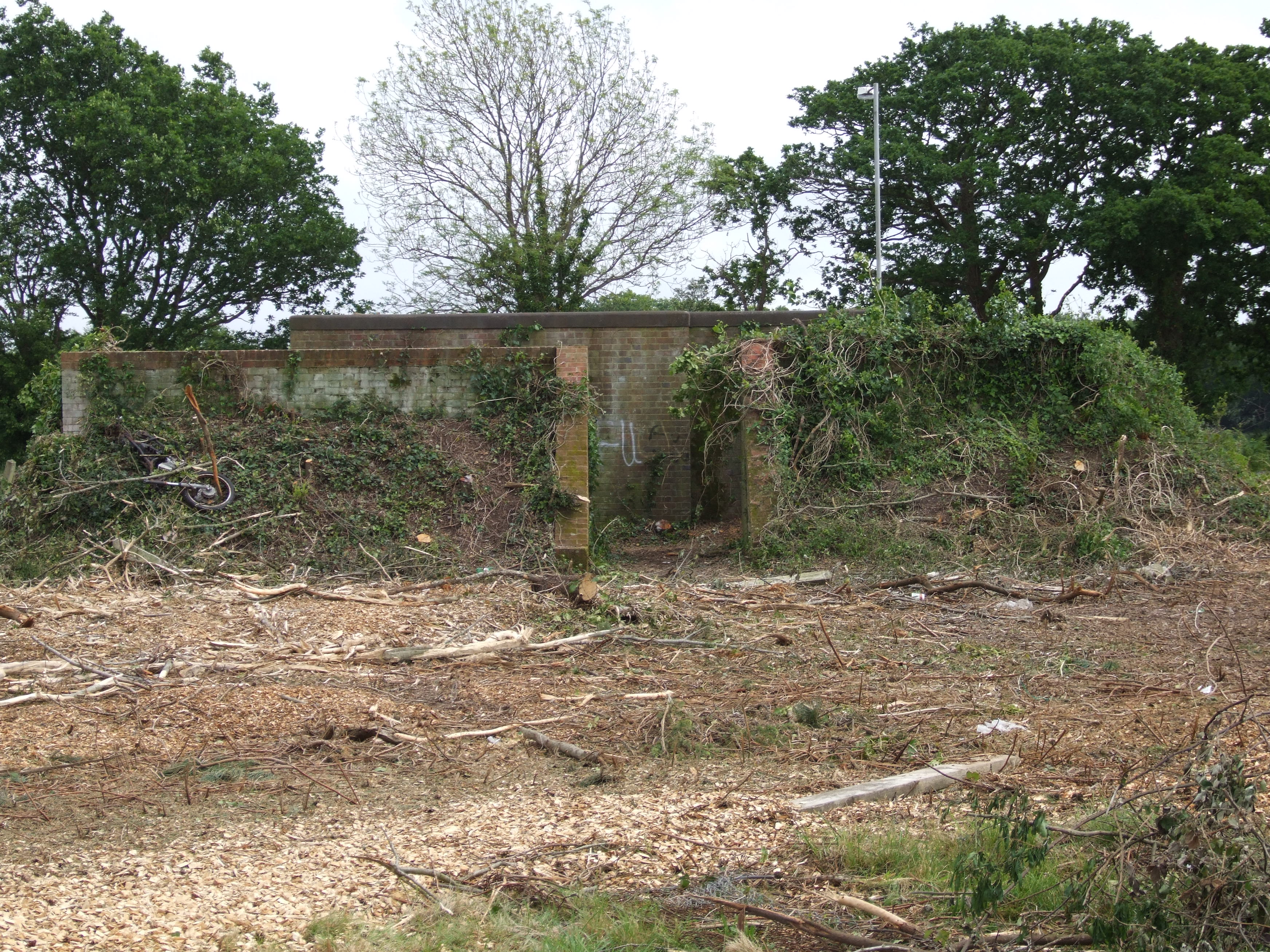
Brick Block house Warmwell 2007

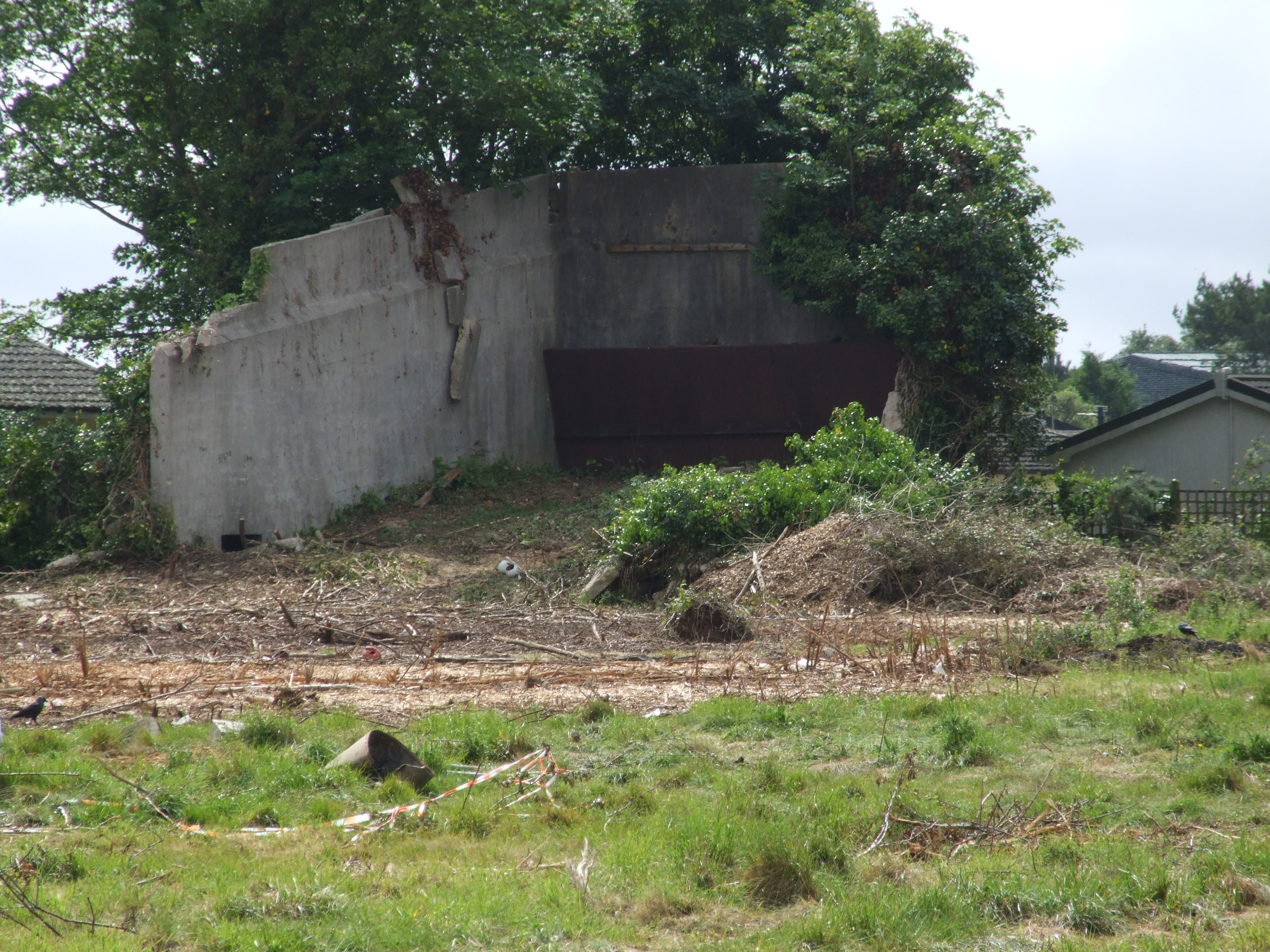
Rifle Range Warmwell 2007

== Current use ==
The airfield proper has for many years been occupied by a quarry, which has effectively removed all trace of the flying field. The site on which the technical site once lay is now the village of Crossways. The original northern taxiway is still in use as a road through the village, where two dispersal pans and the old air traffic control tower (heavily converted to a public dwelling, Egdon House) still remain. The old station cinema is now the village hall.

Two Bellman hangars still remain, rumoured to be used by local farmers for fertilizer storage. An Over Blister hangar (one of eight built during the war) and other buildings exist in the woodland areas surrounding Crossways, although some have been demolished. One of the base's billets is now one of the local shops. At the junction of Mount Skippet Way and Airfield Close in Crossways village housing is a memorial to the airfield, located in a grassed recreational area.

During recent clearance work in preparation for new buildings on the north-east side of the old airfield, a brick block house and a concrete rifle range were revealed. Both have since been demolished. Further clearances to build an access road across the south-east corner of the flying field have resulted in the excavation of a group of the aircraft tie-down points.

== See also ==
- List of former Royal Air Force stations
