= John Ellis (RAF officer) =

British flying ace (1917–2001)

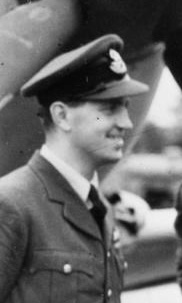
- Born: 28 February 1917; Deal, Kent, United Kingdom
- Died: 19 November 2001 (aged 84)
- Military career
- Allegiance: United Kingdom
- Branch: Royal Air Force (1936–1967)
- Rank: Group Captain
- Commands: RAF Molesworth; Krendi fighter wing No. 610 Squadron
- Conflicts: Second World War: Battle of France; Battle of Britain; Channel Front; Allied invasion of Sicily
- Awards: Commander of the Order of the British Empire; Distinguished Flying Cross & Bar

John Ellis CBE, DFC & Bar (28 February 1917 – 19 November 2001) was a British flying ace of the Royal Air Force (RAF) during the Second World War. He was credited with at least 13 aerial victories.

Born in Deal, Ellis joined the RAF in 1936 and in the prewar period served with No. 213 Squadron. Once war broke out, he was transferred to No. 610 Squadron, of the Auxiliary Air Force. He flew extensively during the aerial fighting over Dunkirk during Operation Dynamo and in the subsequent Battle of Britain, destroying a number of aircraft. The following year, he took up an instructing post, initially in the United Kingdom and later in East Africa. He returned to operations as a wing leader based at Krendi on the island of Malta and flying missions in the lead up to the Allied invasion of Sicily. Shot down on 13 June 1943, he spent the remainder of the war as a prisoner of the Germans.

He continued to serve in the RAF during the postwar period, holding a series of administrative and training posts and also commanding the RAF station at Molesworth for a time. Made an officer in the Order of the British Empire in May 1956, he was elevated to a Commander in the order four years later. He retired from the RAF in 1967 as a group captain. He was a businessman until his retirement. He died in 2001 aged 83.

== Early life ==
John Ellis was born in the Kentish town of Deal on 28 February 1917. After completing his education, at Sutton Valence School, in March 1936 he joined the Royal Air Force (RAF). Granted a commission as an acting pilot officer in May, after completing flight training at No. 11 Flying Training School at Wittering, he was briefly posted to No. 66 Squadron before being transferred in March 1937 to No. 213 Squadron. By this time he had been confirmed in his rank as pilot officer. His new squadron had just been reformed at Northolt with Gloster Gauntlet fighters but from July it was based at Church Fenton as part of No. 12 Group. In January 1939, the squadron began reequipping with Hawker Hurricane fighters.

== Second World War ==
In mid-September 1939, Ellis, now a flying officer, was posted to No. 610 Squadron, an Auxiliary Air Force (AAF) squadron, as one of its flight commanders. Shortly afterwards, it began converting to Supermarine Spitfire fighters at Hooton Park, having previously been operating Hurricanes. The squadron became operational in October, moving to Wittering and tasked with patrolling duties along the East Coast but saw no action. In March 1940 Ellis was involved in a crash when he neglected to properly lower the undercarriage of his Spitfire when landing. Across April and into early May, the squadron operated in support of the British campaign in Norway, covering shipping crossing the North Sea.

Following the German invasion of France, No. 610 Squadron moved south to join No. 11 Group. Based at Biggin Hill, the squadron started patrolling the English Channel. At the end of the month, and following the retreat of the British Expeditionary Force (BEF) to Dunkirk, the squadron operated from Gravesend flying cover over the evacuation beaches. On 27 May, Ellis damaged a Messerschmitt Bf 110 heavy fighter and then two days later shot down a Messerschmitt Bf 109 fighter over Dunkirk. He destroyed a Bf 110 on the last day of the month, 10 miles (16 km) to the east of Dunkirk. By this time Ellis was regularly leading the squadron on sorties, after the death of its commander.

=== Battle of Britain ===
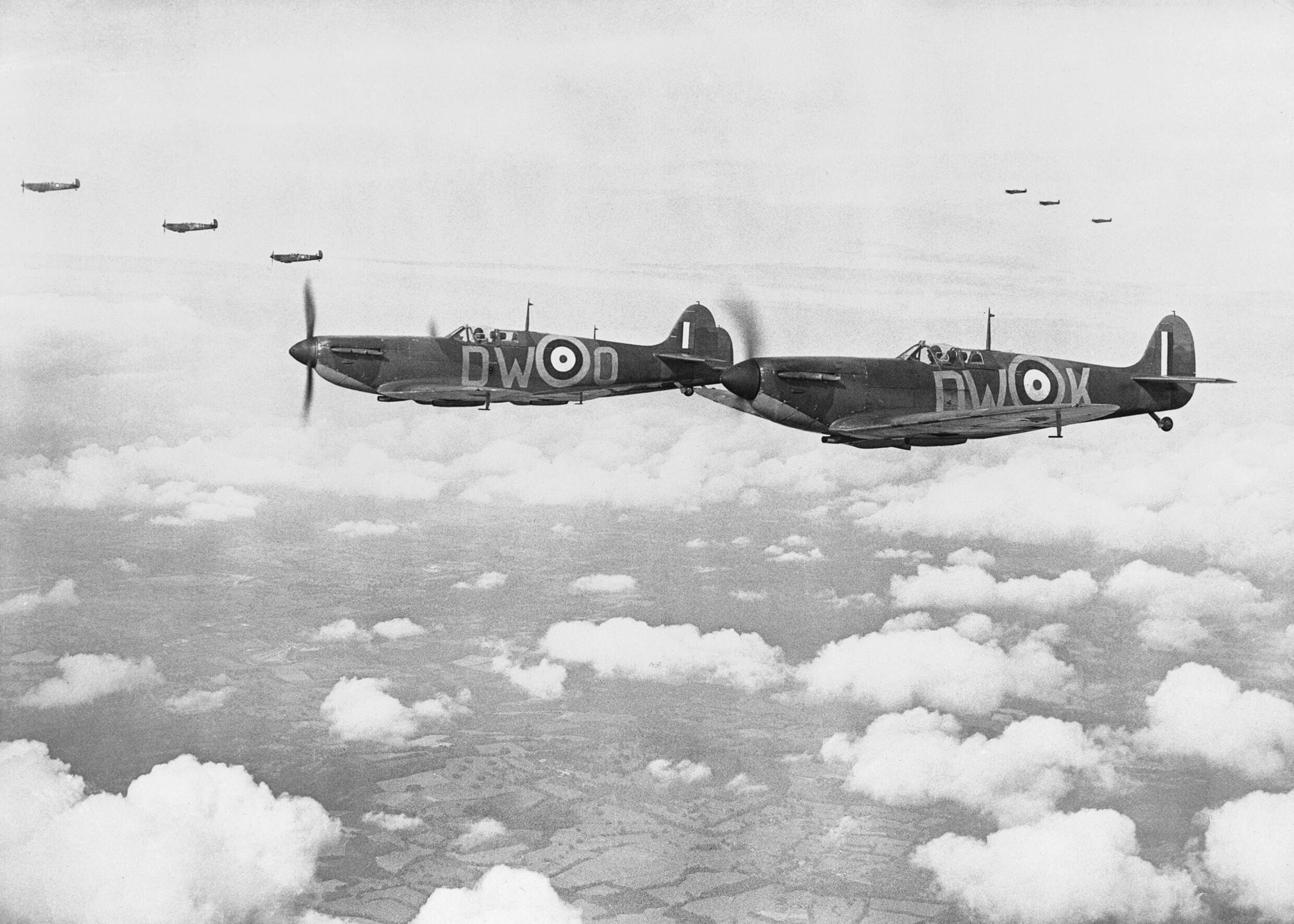
Supermarine Spitfires of No. 610 Squadron in flight, 24 July 1940

Once the evacuation of the BEF was complete, No. 610 Squadron, now commanded by an officer of the AAF, resumed patrolling the English Channel and on 12 June, Ellis shared in the destruction of a Heinkel He 111 medium bomber near Margate. On 3 July he and several other pilots of the flight that he was leading at the time destroyed a Dornier Do 17 medium bomber near Deal although this could not be confirmed. Later in the month, the squadron shifted back to Biggin Hill from where it was regularly scrambled to intercept approaching German bombers and their fighter escorts. He shot down a Bf 109 while patrolling over Dover on 24 July and on a subsequent sortie later the same day destroyed a second Bf 109 near Margate.

The following afternoon Ellis destroyed a Bf 109 off Folkestone, in an action witnessed by his wingman. Scrambled again in the evening as cover for Royal Navy destroyers passing through the English Channel, Ellis and his flight engaged a group of 20 German fighters and in the ensuing dogfight he shot down two Bf 109s. He was promoted to acting squadron leader and given command of the squadron following the death of its commander. He shot down two more Bf 109s when the squadron was scrambled to intercept bombers approaching Dungeness on 12 August, although only one of these was confirmed; the other was claimed as a probable. The next day, he was awarded the Distinguished Flying Cross (DFC); the citation, published in The London Gazette, read:

This officer was employed on offensive patrols over Dunkirk during the evacuation of the British Expeditionary Force and led his flight with great courage. On two occasions, whilst deputising for his Commanding Officer, he led a patrol of four squadrons, displaying great initiative and leadership. During these patrols Flight Lieutenant Ellis destroyed two enemy aircraft. Later, whilst engaged on home defence duties, he shot down one enemy bomber. In July, 1940, whilst leading the squadron, he destroyed two enemy aircraft and on the following day he shot down a further three of eight enemy aircraft destroyed by his squadron. Flight Lieutenant Ellis has displayed courage and leadership of a high order.

— London Gazette, No. 34920, 13 August 1940.

On 16 August Ellis damaged a Junkers Ju 88 medium bomber. Two days later, on what became known as 'the Hardest Day', the Luftwaffe mounted a large-scale attack on a number of airfields in the southeast of England. Biggin Hill was among those targeted; the squadron was scrambled to intercept approaching bombers. Initially it engaged the escorting fighters, Ellis destroying one, a Bf 109, before he began to pursue the bombers, attacking a He 111 which crashed into the English Channel. He shot down a Bf 109 on 26 August near Folkestone and then a He 111 the next day. At the end of the month the squadron moved north to Acklington for a period of rest, performing less intensive operations. During its time in the southeast of England, the squadron had claimed 68 German aircraft destroyed, with another 19 considered probably destroyed, although 18 of its pilots had been killed.

=== Later war service ===
At Acklington, Ellis's focus was on rebuilding No. 610 Squadron by training up replacement pilots. During his time there, he also received a substantive promotion to flight lieutenant. The squadron returned to No. 11 Group in December, based at Westhampnett, and began offensive operations to France early the following year using Spitfire Mk IIs. On 13 March 1941, he destroyed a He 111 off Selsey Bill, his last aerial victory. Ellis was posted to No. 55 Operational Training Unit (OTU) on instructing duties in April and the following month was awarded a bar to his DFC. The published citation read:

This officer has commanded the squadron since July, 1940, and his personal example and tremendous energy have been mainly responsible for the high state of operational efficiency. The squadron has destroyed at least 89 hostile aircraft, 11 of which have been shot down by Squadron Leader Ellis.

— London Gazette, No. 35151, 2 May 1941.

Towards the end of 1941, Ellis was sent to East Africa to continue on instructing duties, now with No. 71 OTU at Khartoum. At the end of the year, his acting rank of squadron leader was made substantive In April 1943, Ellis was appointed leader of the Krendi Wing, based on the island of Malta. His new command was tasked with conducting aerial operations in support of the forthcoming Allied invasion of Sicily. Flying an escort mission for bombers attacking the airfield at Gerbini on 13 June, he was shot down, most likely by the German flying ace Gerhard Michalski. Made a prisoner of war, he was held in Stalag Luft III. While imprisoned at the camp, Ellis was part of its Escape Committee, as second-in-charge to Roger Bushell, teaching potential escapees techniques for living rough. Following the escape of several prisoners, including Bushell, on 24–25 March 1944, Ellis became the leader of the Escape Committee. He remained a prisoner for the remainder of the war.

== Later life ==
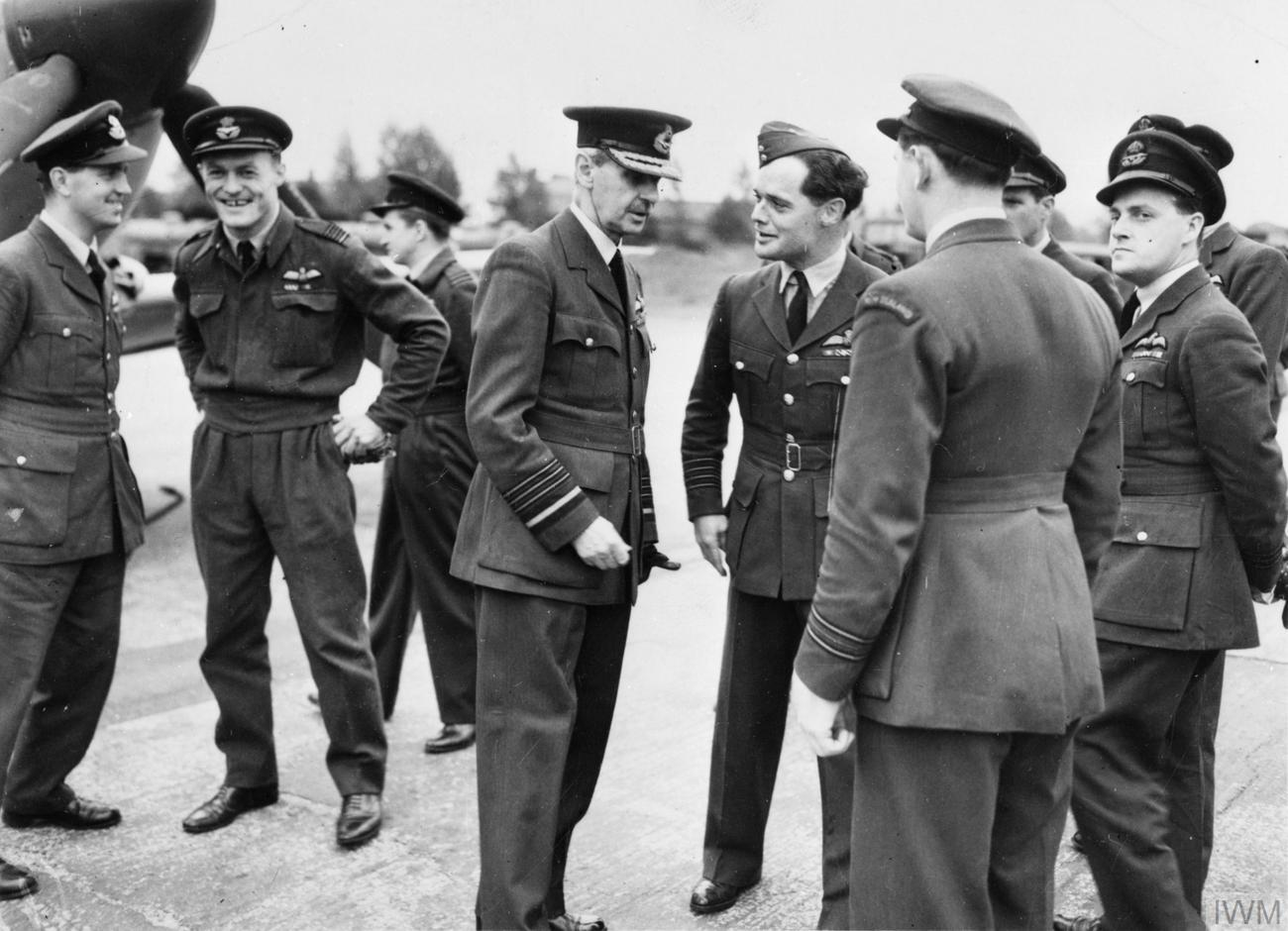
On 15 September 1945, the Royal Air Force performed a flypast over London to commemorate the Battle of Britain; Hugh Dowding (centre), the leader of Fighter Command during the battle, talks to pilots, including Douglas Bader (centre, wearing side cap and facing Dowding), prior to the start of the flight. Ellis stands on the far left

On release from captivity, Ellis returned to the United Kingdom and participated in an anniversary flight over London on 15 September 1945 to commemorate the Battle of Britain. He remained in the RAF in the postwar period, given a permanent commission as a squadron leader with effect from 2 September 1945. He held an appointment as a wing commander with responsibility for training at the headquarters of Fighter Command. Promoted to wing commander at the start of 1951, he was subsequently in charge of the RAF station at Molesworth. He later attended RAF Staff College and the majority of his later career in the RAF was spent in administrative roles. He was appointed as an officer in the Order of the British Empire in the 1956 Birthday Honours and three years later was promoted to group captain, taking up a posting as Senior Personnel Staff Officer at Fighter Command. In the 1960 Queen's Birthday Honours, his appointment in the Order of the British Empire was elevated to commander.

Ellis retired from the RAF in February 1967 after over 30 years of service; his final posting had been to No. 38 Group in Odiham. Returning to civilian life, he was a businessman until his retirement to Hampshire. He died on 19 November 2001, aged 83. He is credited with thirteen aerial victories, with a further victory shared with other pilots. He is also credited with one aircraft probably destroyed and two damaged. One additional victory, also shared with other pilots, was unconfirmed.
