= No. 276 Squadron RAF =

Former flying squadron of the Royal Air Force

- Active: 21 October 1941 – 14 November 1945
- Country: United Kingdom
- Branch: Royal Air Force
- Motto(s): Retrieve

Insignia
- Squadron Badge: The head of a labrador Retriever dog
- Squadron Code: AQ (October 1941 – November 1945)

No. 276 Squadron RAF was a Royal Air Force Squadron formed as an air-sea rescue unit in World War II.

== History ==
=== Formation in World War II ===
The squadron formed at RAF Harrowbeer, Devon on 21 October 1941 equipped with the Lysander and Walrus, with the responsibility of Air Sea Rescue over the Western part of the English Channel and the Bristol Channel. Hurricanes, Defiants, Spitfires and Ansons were then supplied, the fighter aircraft being used for spotting downed aircrew at sea and for dropping dinghies to the downed airmen. For a time it was commanded by Squadron Leader Ronald Hamlyn.

Warwicks which could drop lifeboats were operated from April 1944 until they were transferred to No. 277 Squadron RAF. A detachment and then the whole squadron relocated to Querqueville, France, and then Belgium following the Normandy landings. The squadron then moved to Kjevik, Norway, on 23 August 1945 and it returned to RAF Dunsfold on 10 November 1945 where it disbanded on 14 November 1945.

== Aircraft operated ==
Aircraft operated by No. 276 Squadron RAF
From	To	Aircraft	Variant
Oct 1941	May 1943	Westland Lysander	IIIA
Nov 1941	Jan 1942	Hawker Hurricane	I
Jan 1942	Nov 1945	Supermarine Walrus	
Mar 1942	Apr 1942	Supermarine Spitfire	IIA
May 1942	Jun 1943	Boulton Paul Defiant	I
Feb 1943	May 1944	Supermarine Spitfire	IIA
Mar 1943	Mar 1944	Avro Anson	I
Feb 1944	May 1944	Supermarine Sea Otter	
Apr 1944	Nov 1944	Vickers Warwick	I
May 1944	Jun 1945	Supermarine Spitfire	VB
