= RAF Harrowbeer =

Former airbase of the Royal Air Force, in Devon, England

RAF Harrowbeer
- Near Yelverton, Devon in England
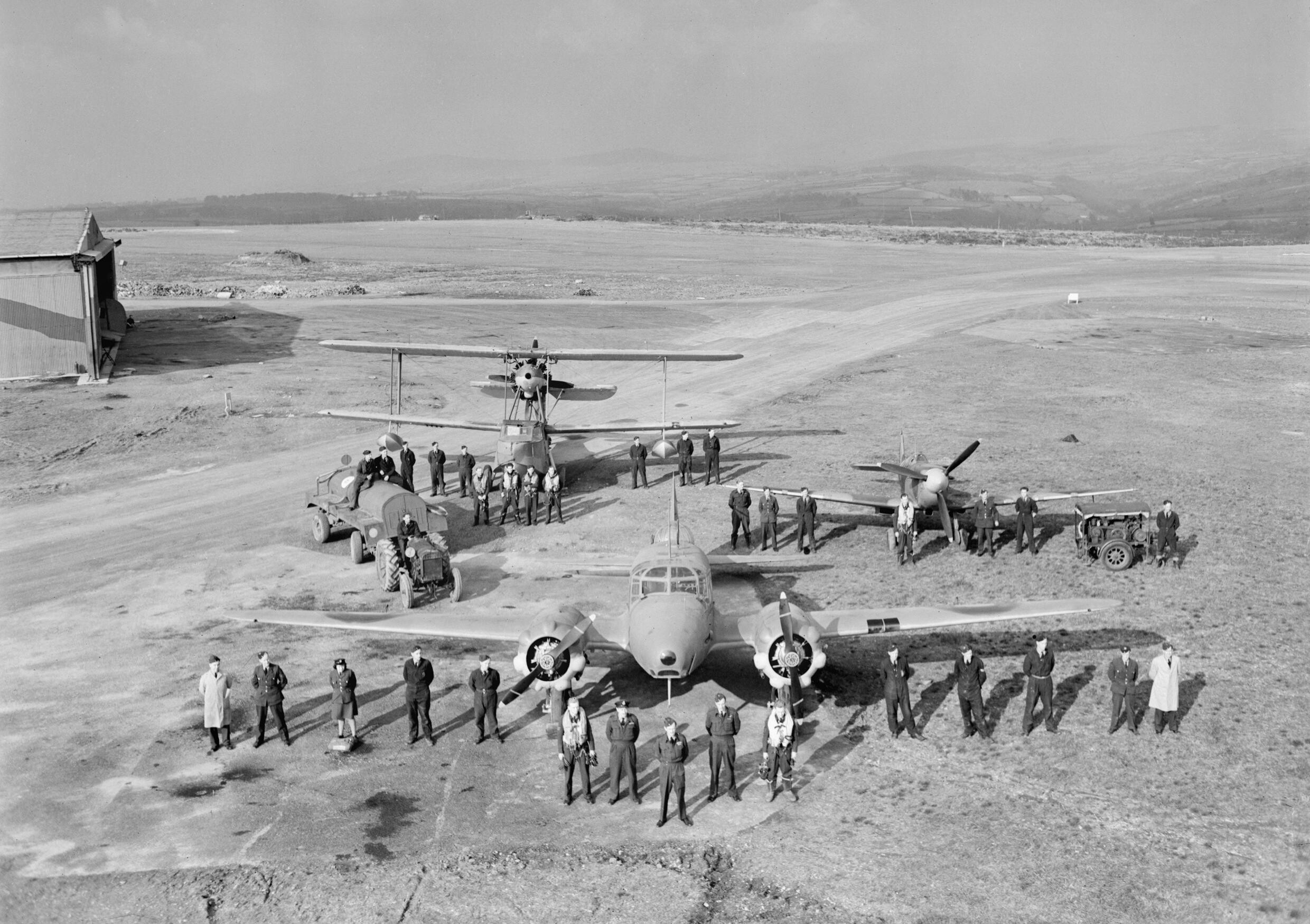
- Aircraft and personnel required for a WWII Air/Sea rescue operation

Site information
- Type: Royal Air Force station
- Code: QB
- Owner: Air Ministry
- Operator: Royal Air Force
- Controlled by: RAF Fighter Command * No. 10 Group RAF; 1941-44 & 1945-50

Location
- Shown within Devon RAF Harrowbeer (the United Kingdom)
- Coordinates: 50°29′27″N 004°05′36″W

Site history
- Built: 1941
- In use: August 1941 - 1950
- Battles/wars: European theatre of World War II

Airfield information
- Elevation: 198 metres (650 ft) AMSL
Runways
Direction	Length and surface
05/23	834 metres (2,736 ft) Asphalt
11/29	1,171 metres (3,842 ft) Asphalt
17/35	1,020 metres (3,346 ft) Asphalt

Royal Air Force Harrowbeer or more simply RAF Harrowbeer is a former Royal Air Force station situated next to Yelverton in the parish of Buckland Monachorum, Devon, England.

== Location ==
RAF Harrowbeer was located approximately 9 miles (14 km) NNE of the city of Plymouth and approximately 6 miles (9.7 km) south of Tavistock, and also sits within the boundary of Dartmoor National Park. Roborough Rock is a tor-like igneous rock outcrop immediately south-west of the airfield (officially called 'Udal Tor') on Roborough Down, next to the border with the A386. This location created problems for the airfield during the Second World War, mainly due to bad weather. The Rock seems to have had little impact on the use of the Airfield, the only thing that was done by the RAF was the placing of a warning light on the top. There seems to be no truth in the widely held belief that the RAF attempted to blow it up.

Although sited near the village of Yelverton, it was called 'Harrowbeer' in order to distinguish it from the similar-sounding RNAS Yeovilton which had recently changed its name from HMS Heron when the Airfield opened on 15 August 1941. The airfield was under the control of No. 10 Group RAF and never assigned a station badge.

The former Ravenscroft School became the officers' mess.

Canadian pilot Jack Brown, of 193 Squadron, recounts his first training flight in the relatively new, and daunting, Hawker Typhoon fighter-bomber at Harrowbeer:

"We were understandably in awe of the Tiffie's size and power. We had been warned of the violent effect of torque . . . which caused a swing to the right on takeoff . . On takeoff, I locked my left leg rigidly on the rudder bar . . . I got off safely . . [but] At times I felt as if the machine was flying me! . . . [on landing] To make sure I didn't stall it, I came in with a little too much speed. The runways at Harrowbeer were not exceptionally long and I could see a pile of bricks at the end coming up fast. Luckily, the brakes held and the machine stopped in time."

Once 193 Squadron became operational at Harrowbeer, they began patrolling the coast to intercept low level attacks by Focke-Wulf Fw 190 fighter-bombers. The Typhoon patrols against the 190s

". . . were carried out by pairs of aircraft; one right down on the water, the other about a hundred feet up. Several fellows bent the ends of their props when they flew too low and actually touched the sea. We did standby duty, waiting at the end of the runway, ready to take off as soon as a Very pistol was fired from the control tower." Later, the Typhoon pilots at Harrowbeer also launched attacks on shipping targets on the French coast, the first target being Brest.

Harrowbeer saw its most distinguished visitor arrive on 2 August 1945, when US President Harry Truman, returning home from the Potsdam Conference, was unable to route via RAF St Mawgan in Cornwall due to it being closed due to fog, and his aircraft landed instead at Harrowbeer. Reception formalities were somewhat limited and, after dining with King George VI onboard the Royal Navy Battlecruiser HMS Renown in Plymouth, Truman sailed for his Atlantic crossing onboard the American cruiser USS Augusta.

== Based units ==
The airfield opened in May 1941. It closed following the end of the Second World War.

A large number of units used the airfield at some point, such as:

- No. 1 Squadron RAF (1944)
- No. 19 Squadron RAF
- No. 26 Squadron RAF
- No. 64 Squadron RAF (1944)
- No. 126 Squadron RAF (1944)
- No. 130 Squadron RAF (1941)
- No. 131 Squadron RAF (1944)
- No. 165 Squadron RAF (1944)
- No. 175 Squadron RAF (1942)
- No. 183 Squadron RAF (1943)
- No. 193 Squadron RAF (1942-43 & 1943-44)
- No. 263 Squadron RAF (1943 & 1944)
- No. 266 Squadron RAF (1943 & 1943-44 & 1944)
- No. 275 Squadron RAF
- No. 276 Squadron RAF
- No. 286 Squadron RAF
- No. 302 (City of Poznan) Polish Fighter Squadron RAF (1941-42)
- No. 312 (Czechoslovak) Squadron RAF (1942)
- No. 329 (GC I/2 'Cicognes') Squadron RAF
- No. 414 Squadron RCAF
- No. 500 (County of Kent) Squadron AAF
- No. 610 (County of Chester) Squadron AAF (1944)
- No. 611 (West Lancashire) Squadron AAF (1944)
- No. 616 (South Yorkshire) Squadron AAF
- No. 691 Squadron RAF
- 834 Naval Air Squadron
- 838 Naval Air Squadron

=== Other units ===
- No. 19 Group Communication Flight
- No. 78 (Signals) Wing Calibration Flight RAF
- No. 82 Gliding School RAF
- No. 156 (General Reconnaissance) Wing RAF
- Force 135 (RAF Element)
- No. 229 Maintenance Unit RAF
- No. 401 Air Stores Park
- No. 2738 Squadron RAF Regiment
- No. 2847 Squadron RAF Regiment
- No. 2883 Squadron RAF Regiment
- No. 2891 Squadron RAF Regiment
