= Caesar Hull =

Southern Rhodesian World War II flying ace

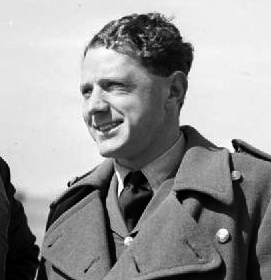
- Hull at RAF Wick in Scotland in early 1940
- Born: Caesar Barrand Hull; 26 February 1914; Near Shangani, Southern Rhodesia
- Died: 7 September 1940 (aged 26); Purley, Surrey, England
- Burial place: Tangmere, Sussex
- Military career
- Allegiance: United Kingdom
- Branch: Royal Air Force
- Service years: 1935–1940
- Rank: Squadron Leader
- Service number: 37285
- Unit: No. 263 Squadron
- Commands: No. 43 Squadron (September 1940)
- Conflicts: Second World War; Norwegian Campaign; Battle of Britain †
- Awards: Distinguished Flying Cross
- Other work: Member of South African boxing team at the 1934 Empire Games

Caesar Barrand Hull, (Note: The Commonwealth War Graves Commission records his middle name as Barraud, his father being named as William Barraud Hull.) DFC (26 February 1914 – 7 September 1940) was a Royal Air Force (RAF) flying ace during the Second World War, noted especially for his part in the fighting for Narvik during the Norwegian Campaign in 1940, and for being one of "The Few"—the Allied pilots of the Battle of Britain, in which he was shot down and killed. From a farming family, Hull's early years were spent in Southern Rhodesia, South Africa and Swaziland. He boxed for South Africa at the 1934 Empire Games. After being turned down by the South African Air Force because he did not speak Afrikaans, he joined the RAF and, on becoming a pilot officer in August 1936, mustered into No. 43 Squadron at RAF Tangmere in Sussex.

A skilful pilot, Hull dedicated much of his pre-war service to aerobatics, flying Hawker Audaxes, Furies and Hurricanes. He reacted to the outbreak of war with enthusiasm and achieved No. 43 Squadron's first victory of the conflict in late January 1940. Reassigned to Norway in May 1940 to command a flight of Gloster Gladiator biplanes belonging to No. 263 Squadron, he downed four German aircraft in an hour over the Bodø area south-west of Narvik on 26 May, a feat that earned him the Distinguished Flying Cross. He was shot down the next day, and invalided back to England. Hull returned to action at the end of August, when he was made commander of No. 43 Squadron with the rank of squadron leader. A week later, he died in a dogfight over south London.

With eight confirmed aerial victories during the war, including five over Norway, Hull was the RAF's first Gladiator ace and the most successful RAF pilot of the Norwegian Campaign. He was buried among fellow fighter pilots at Tangmere, and a monument to his memory was erected near his birthplace in Southern Rhodesia. This remained until 2004, when the plaque was transported to England and donated to the Tangmere Military Aviation Museum. Other memorials to Hull were built in Bodø in 1977 and Purley, where his aircraft crashed, in 2013.

== Early life ==
Caesar Barrand Hull was born on 26 February 1914 at Leachdale Farm, a property near Shangani in Southern Rhodesia. His childhood years were divided between Rhodesia and South Africa, and in his early teens the family moved to Swaziland. He was educated at home until 1926, when he began to board at St. John's College in Johannesburg. A champion boxer, he represented South Africa in the lightweight division at the 1934 Empire Games in London.

Hull attempted to join the South African Air Force in 1935, but was turned down because he did not speak Afrikaans. He joined the Royal Air Force (RAF) instead, enlisting in England in September 1935. Completing the pilot's course on 3 August 1936 with the rank of pilot officer, he joined No. 43 Squadron at RAF Tangmere in Sussex five days later.

Much of Hull's early air force career was dedicated to aerobatics. He and Peter "Prosser" Hanks perfected a routine in which they would change places in a two-seater Hawker Audax in mid-air. Along with Peter Townsend (who joined the squadron at the same time as Hull) and Sergeant Frank Reginald Carey, they formed an aerobatic flight that performed stunts such as loops, barrel rolls and stall turns. Piloting a Hawker Fury, Hull flew the individual aerobatics at the air show at Hendon in 1937 honouring the coronation of King George VI.

Hull was promoted to flying officer on 16 April 1938. As war loomed, the squadron began to prepare for combat in late 1938, and in December that year was re-equipped with Hawker Hurricane Mk Is.

== Air war in Europe ==
=== Early war ===
Hull reacted to the outbreak of the Second World War in September 1939 with great excitement; according to Hector Bolitho, No. 43 Squadron's intelligence officer, the Rhodesian leapt from one foot to the other in the officer's mess, repeating the words "wizard, wizard". In November 1939, No. 43 Squadron moved to RAF Acklington, near Newcastle-upon-Tyne, flying Hawker Hurricane Mk Is. Amid severe weather conditions, Hull scored the squadron's first victory of the war on 30 January 1940, when he shot down a Heinkel He 111 bomber of the Luftwaffe near the island of Coquet. On 26 February the squadron was transferred to RAF Wick in northern Scotland to help protect the Home Fleet at Scapa Flow. Hull, Carey and three others together downed another He 111 on 28 March 1940. On 10 April 1940, Hull took part in the destruction of a reconnaissance He 111. The aircraft had been sent out in advance of a major raid launched by He 111s from Kampfgeschwader 26 and Kampfgruppe 100, aimed at covering the German invasion of Norway.

When No. 43 Squadron returned to its home base at Tangmere in May 1940, some of its leading pilots were reassigned to other units: among these were Townsend, who was assigned to No. 85 Squadron RAF as its commanding officer, and Hull, who was posted to No. 263 Squadron to command a flight of Gloster Gladiator biplanes during the unit's second committal to the Norwegian Campaign.

=== Norway ===
Hull supported the Allied troops fighting at Narvik in late May 1940, during Operation Alphabet.

No. 263 Squadron was deployed to the area around Narvik, a strategically valuable port city in northern Norway then under German control, but fiercely contested by the Norwegians and Allies. Crossing the Norwegian Sea aboard the aircraft carrier HMS Furious, the pilots took off on 21 May while at sea, in groups of three each led by a Fairey Swordfish of the Fleet Air Arm, and encountered thick mist around the island of Senja; the Swordfish and two Gladiators from one of the groups crashed into a mountain. Hull led the first four aircraft through and landed safely at Bardufoss airfield, about 80 kilometres (50 mi) north-east of Narvik, at 04:20. A further 12 Gladiators followed four hours later. Fourteen Gladiators were operational and began flying patrols from Bardufoss on 22 May, carrying out 30 sorties on the first day. Hull and two other pilots together downed a He 111 over Salangen on 24 May 1940, killing two of the five German crew; the other three were captured by Norwegian troops after making an emergency landing at Fjordbotneidet. In all, during its two weeks of operations in northern Norway, No. 263 Squadron was to claim 26 confirmed kills and nine probable victories during 70 dogfights.

Hull and two other pilots, South African Pilot Officer Jack Falkson and Naval Lieutenant Tony Lydekker, volunteered to be detached to an improvised airstrip at Bodø, a port about 100 kilometres (62 mi) south-west of Narvik, on 26 May 1940 to cover Allied troops who were retreating north for evacuation under Operation Alphabet. Arriving to find the airfield extremely muddy, the pilots had great difficulty moving their aircraft to drier ground to refuel from four-gallon (18-l) tin cans. A He 111 was spotted overhead while this was in progress, prompting the three pilots to scramble having only partially refuelled. Falkson's plane crashed after mud clung to its wheels, and while Lydekker took off successfully, he had so little fuel that Hull almost immediately ordered him to land to add more.

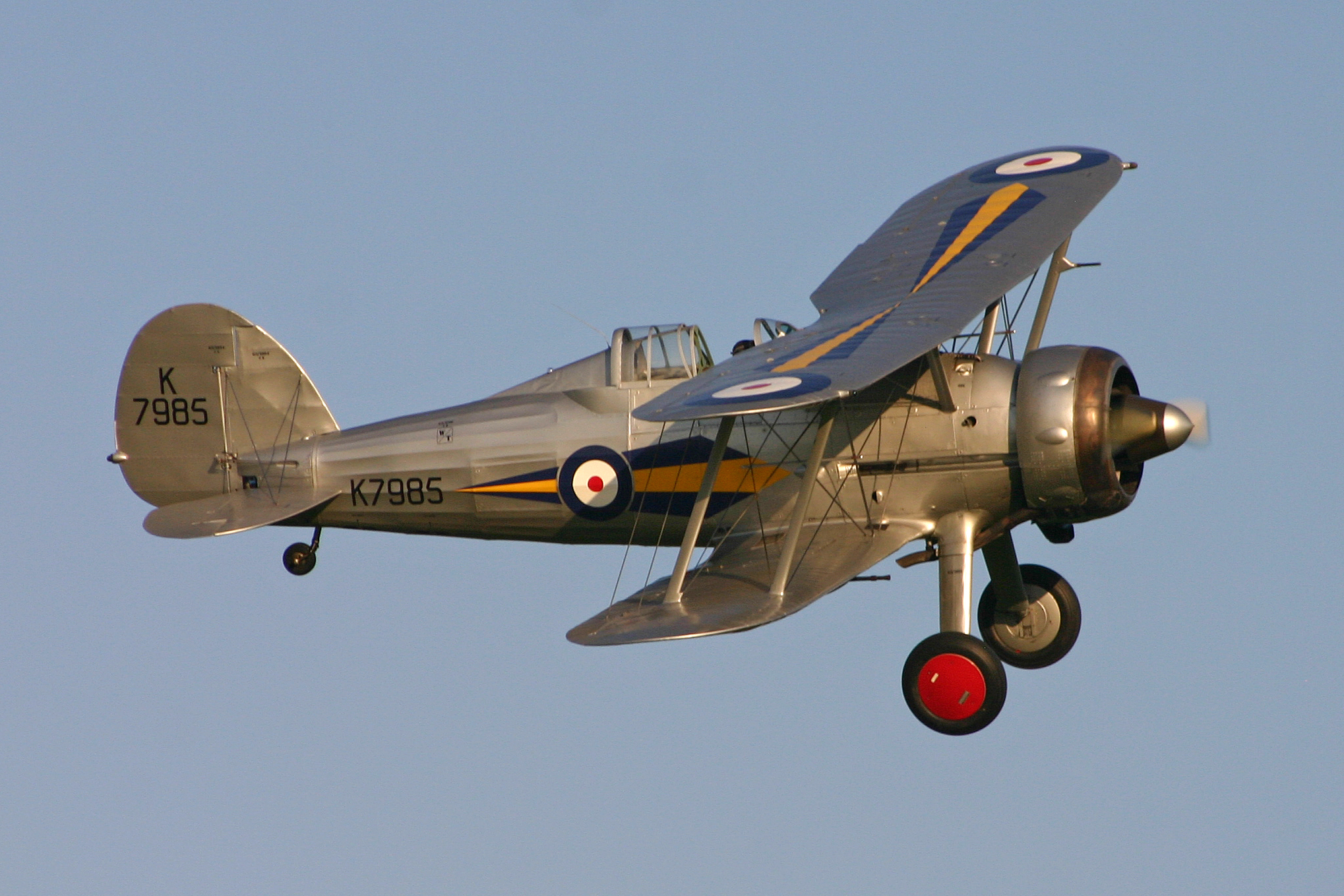
Gloster Gladiator, a type flown by Hull over northern Norway

The Rhodesian pursued the He 111 over the main valley in Saltdal Municipality and, with three attacks from astern, set the bomber ablaze, forcing it to crash. Hull then downed a Junkers Ju 52 transport plane and, after unsuccessfully chasing another He 111, destroyed two more Ju 52s. The transports had been coming to the aid of the hard-pressed German forces fighting around Narvik; one was loaded with supplies, while the other two were carrying Fallschirmjäger paratroops. One of the latter aircraft successfully landed in German-held territory before burning out, allowing the crew and paratroopers aboard to exit safely, but the second spiralled out of control and crashed, killing eight German paratroopers. Hull then attacked another He 111, which soon retreated, giving off smoke. Having used up all his ammunition, Hull returned to Bodø. In the space of about an hour, in a technologically-outdated aircraft and without assistance, he had destroyed four German planes and damaged a fifth.

Hull, Falkson and Lydekker spent the night of 26/27 May 1940 patrolling the area around Rognan, about 20 kilometres (12 mi) inland from Bodø. (Note: They shared two Gladiators as Falkson's could not fly following his earlier crash.) After driving German bombers away from British and Norwegian forces fighting at Pothus south of Rognan, the Gladiators strafed German ground forces. Around 08:00 on 27 May, Bodø was attacked by 11 Ju 87 "Stuka" dive bombers from I./Sturzkampfgeschwader 1 (StG 1 – Dive Bomber Wing 1) and three Messerschmitt Bf 110 fighters attached to I./Zerstörergeschwader 76 (ZG 76 – Destroyer Wing 76). Lydekker claimed one of the Stukas, but was ultimately forced to limp north to Bardufoss to land, his Gladiator heavily damaged. Having initially been caught on the ground by the German attack, Hull got his fighter airborne during a pause in the raid. After engaging the German aircraft and shooting down Feldwebel Kurt Zube's Stuka, which fell into the sea, Hull was overcome by one of the Bf 110s, piloted by Oberleutnant Helmut Lent, and forced to crash near the Bodø airfield. Wounded in the head and the knee, he was initially treated at Bodø Hospital before being evacuated back to Britain for further treatment on a Sunderland flying boat via Harstad. Hull's kills during the Norwegian Campaign made him the RAF's first Gloster Gladiator ace, as well as the most successful RAF fighter pilot of the campaign. On 17 June, while convalescing, he was awarded the Distinguished Flying Cross for his actions in Norway.

=== Battle of Britain ===
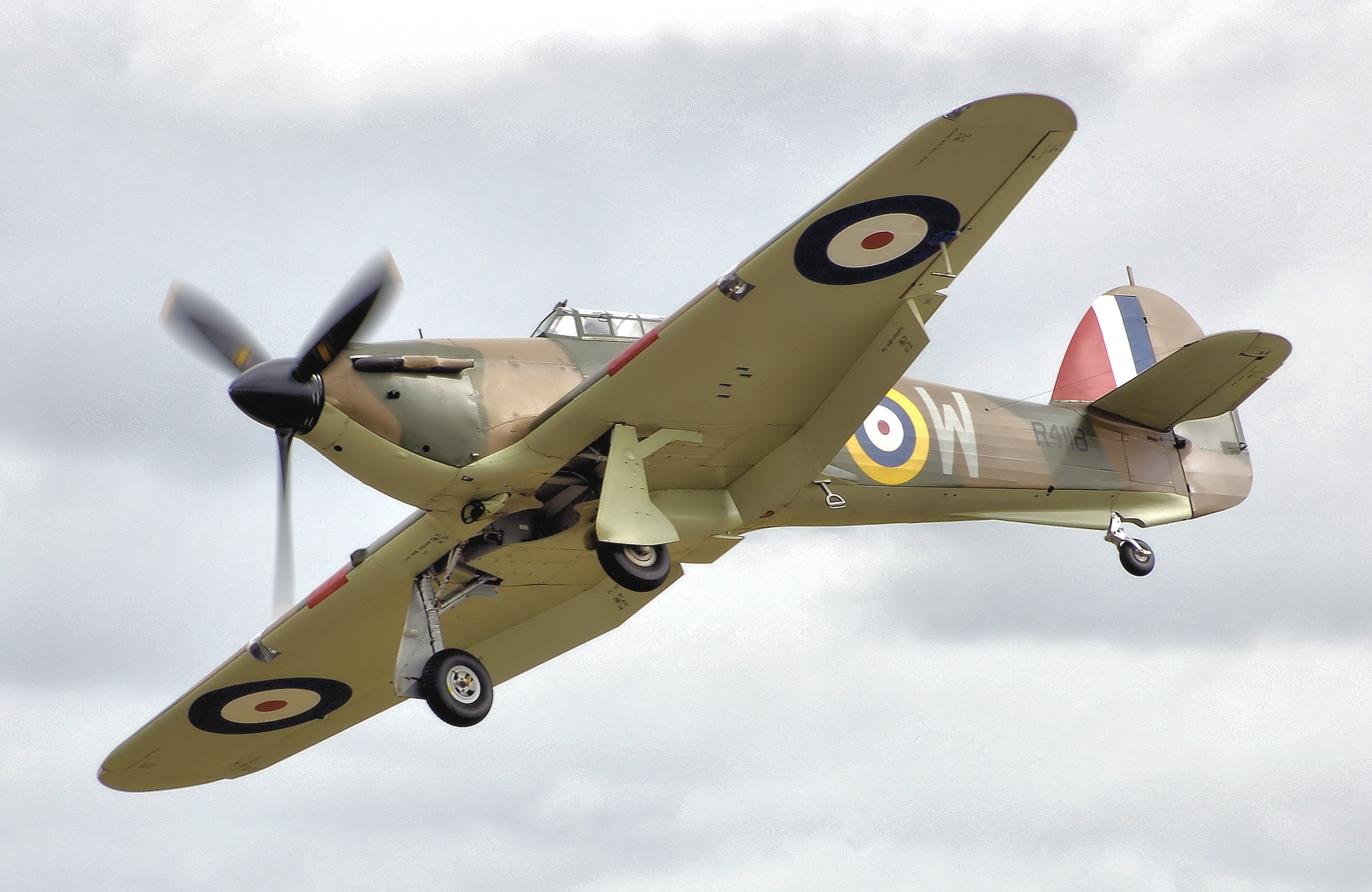
Hawker Hurricane Mk I, similar to that flown by Hull as commander of No. 43 Squadron during the Battle of Britain

Hull was declared fit to return to operational duty after about two months' rest and recuperation in Guildford, and on 31 August 1940 he was appointed commanding officer of his former unit, No. 43 Squadron, replacing Squadron Leader John "Tubby" Badger, who had been shot down and grievously wounded the previous day. The unit was still based at Tangmere, flying Hurricanes, and was by now fighting in the Battle of Britain, the Allied participants of which would later be dubbed "The Few". Concurrently promoted to squadron leader, Hull expressed disbelief at his sudden elevation and "as if to emphasise his surprise", Andy Saunders records, suffixed his first description of himself on paper as "Commanding No. 43 Sqn" with four exclamation marks.

The first engagement of Hull's command, on 2 September, resulted in three of the squadron's Hurricanes being shot down in return for two Messerschmitt Bf 109s. (Note: Pilot Officer Tony Woods-Scawen parachuted from his flaming Hurricane too low and was killed. The other two RAF pilots, New Zealand Flight Officer Malcolm "Crackers" Carswell and Belgian Pilot Officer D A R G le Roy du Vivier, survived.) On 4 September, Hull led a group of Hurricanes in a decisive aerial victory over coastal Sussex against a large group of Bf 110s from ZGs 2 and 76. Flight Lieutenant Thomas Dalton-Morgan destroyed a Bf 110 north of Worthing and chased another until it crashed near Shoreham-by-Sea, while Sergeant Jeffreys shot down another Bf 110 in a field. Pilot Officer A E A van den Hove d'Ertsenrijck, from Belgium, pursued a fourth back out to sea and sent it crashing into the English Channel, but was hit himself and compelled to make an emergency landing at RAF Ford. Hull and Pilot Officer Hamilton Upton together seriously damaged two more Bf 110s.

Around 16:00 on 7 September 1940, nine Hurricanes of No. 43 Squadron scrambled to intercept a large formation of German aircraft over Kent on their way to London. Hull led six of the aircraft towards the German bombers while Flight Lieutenant John "Killy" Kilmartin, from Ireland, headed a section of three tasked with countering the fighter escort. Hull took his aircraft above the bombers, then dived towards them, telling his pilots to "smash them up". A very fast engagement followed in which Hull was killed while diving to the aid of Flight Lieutenant Dick Reynell, an Australian pilot who had come under heavy attack. Hull was last seen firing at a Dornier Do 17, and was shot down by a Bf 109. (Note: It is impossible to know which German unit the Bf 109 in question came from as seven Jagdgeschwader (fighter wings) were operating in the raid.) Reynell was also killed. The Rhodesian ace's body was discovered largely burnt inside the shell of his Hurricane, which had crashed in the grounds of Purley Boys' High School in Purley, Surrey. He was 26 years old.

The loss of Hull and Reynell, two of the squadron's most popular pilots, affected morale deeply. Kilmartin, arriving back at Tangmere on the evening of 7 September, simply muttered "My God, My God". Dalton-Morgan took over command of the squadron. Hull's remains were recovered and returned to Tangmere, where he was buried among fellow fighter pilots at St Andrew's Church. His final confirmed record for the war was four German aircraft destroyed, two damaged and four shared destroyed (counted at half a victory each); also noted were one unconfirmed destroyed, two probably destroyed and one shared probable.

== Memorials ==
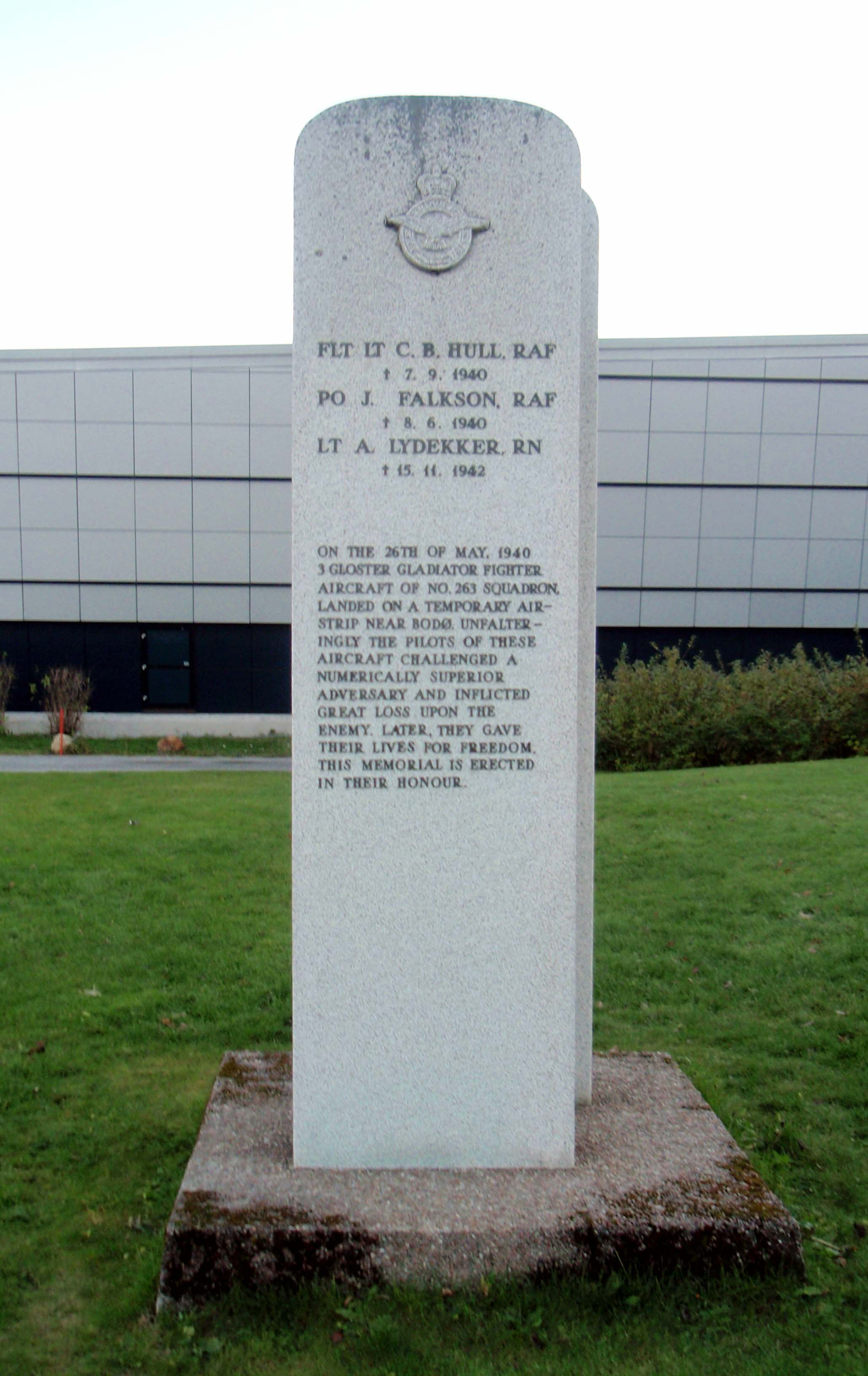
The memorial to Hull, Falkson and Lydekker in Bodø, next to the Norwegian Aviation Museum

After Hull's death, the people of Shangani organised the construction of a memorial in his honour—a granite plinth to which a brass plaque was affixed commemorating the pilot's service and bravery. This monument was completed before the end of the war and erected alongside the main road between Bulawayo and Gwelo, near the bridge over the Shangani River. A memorial to the actions of Hull, Jack Falkson and Lydekker at Bodø was built at the town's airport three decades later, and inaugurated on 17 June 1977 with the Norwegian Minister of Defence, Rolf Arthur Hansen, in attendance.

After Rhodesia's reconstitution as Zimbabwe in 1980, Robert Mugabe's government disowned many old monuments making reference to the fallen of the World Wars, including the Hull memorial at Shangani. The Hull family resolved in 2003 to take the plaque down and donate it to the Tangmere Military Aviation Museum, an idea that the museum welcomed. The plaque was removed, flown to England free of charge by MK Airlines—a freight carrier owned by a former Rhodesian Air Force pilot, Mike Kruger—and ceremonially delivered to the Tangmere museum curator on 17 April 2004 by Hull's sister, Wendy Bryan.

A new monument to Hull was erected at Coulsdon Sixth Form College, which today occupies the Purley High School site, in 2013. Depicting an aeroplane and a dove intertwined, it was formally dedicated on 11 November that year, Remembrance Day, with Bryan present.

== Character and reputation ==
He was the best chap I have ever met—an extraordinarily skilful pilot and a lively character.

— Fellow No. 263 Squadron flight commander Tom Rowland

Hull was remembered by his comrades as an exceptional pilot and an affable, jovial personality. Jimmy Beedle, in his 1966 history of No. 43 Squadron, called Hull one of its all-time great characters, citing him as a major factor in the squadron's "high standard of flying and ... outstanding squadron spirit". John Simpson, who joined the unit as a pilot officer two months after Hull, recalled finding "a confidence when flying with Caesar that was wholly lacking otherwise." "I have never seen anyone who could throw a fighter about with so much confidence as old Caesar," said another pilot, quoted by Beedle. "Nobody gave me so much confidence to have a lead from, nobody gave me so much exhilaration and fun. Following Caesar you found yourself getting more out of your machine than you had ever imagined was possible, doing things that done by yourself would have made your hair stand on end."

"All the superlatives have already been written about Caesar," Beedle wrote. "Caesar Barrand Hull, of the crinkly hair and the croaky voice, the laughing warrior whose idea of a lark was to change seats in the air ... who had a phobia about worms or slugs, who would look under the bed 'in case there are any feenies about', then kneel beside it and say his prayers." Bolitho took a similar line in his 1943 book Combat Report, attesting to Hull's "bubbling, unquenchable gaiety". According to Bolitho, Hull was "possessed of a magic power of creating happiness in others; making them belittle their cares, of inspiring them with confidence, not simply in him but in themselves. Of imbuing them with his own abounding love of life. Where Caesar was, laughter was."

== Notes and references ==
Footnotes

Newspaper and journal articles

- Baynes, Chris (12 November 2013). "Fighter pilot shot down over Coulsdon school honoured in memorial". Your Local Guardian. Weybridge, Surrey: Newsquest.
- Musgrave, Bill (2004). "Squadron Leader Caesar B Hull, DFC" (PDF). Battle of Britain Remembered. Fairlight, East Sussex: The Battle of Britain Historical Society.

Bibliography

- Barrymaine, Norman (1958). The Peter Townsend Story. New York: E P Dutton. OCLC 1343117.
- Beedle, Jimmy (2011) [1966]. The Fighting Cocks: 43 (Fighter) Squadron (Thirdlocation=Barnsley ed.). Pen and Sword Books. ISBN 978-1-84884-385-1.
- Bolitho, Hector (1943). Combat Report: The Story of a Fighter Pilot. London: B T Batsford. OCLC 1232515.
- De la Bédoyère, Guy (2000). Battles over Britain: the archaeology of the air war. London: NPI Media Group. ISBN 978-0-7524-1485-0.
- Goss, Chris (2011) [2000]. Luftwaffe Fighters and Bombers: The Battle of Britain. Mechanicsburg, Pennsylvania: Stackpole Books. ISBN 978-0-8117-0749-7.
- Haarr, Geirr H (2010). The Battle for Norway – April–June 1940. Barnsley: Seaforth Publishing. ISBN 978-1-84832-057-4.
- Hafsten, Bjørn; Larsstuvold, Ulf; Olsen, Bjørn; Stenersen, Sten (2005). Flyalarm – luftkrigen over Norge 1939–1945 (in Norwegian) (Second, revised ed.). Oslo: Sem og Stenersen AS. ISBN 82-7046-074-5.
- Holmes, Tony (1998). Hurricane Aces 1939–40. Osprey Aircraft of the Aces. Vol. 18 (First ed.). Oxford: Osprey Publishing. ISBN 1-85532-597-7.
- Mason, Francis (1969). Battle over Britain. London: McWhirter Twins. ISBN 978-0-901928-00-9.
- Salt, Beryl (2001). A Pride of Eagles: The Definitive History of the Rhodesian Air Force, 1920–1980. Weltevredenpark, South Africa: Covos Day Books. ISBN 978-0-620-23759-8.
- Saunders, Andy (2003). No 43 'Fighting Cocks' Squadron. Aviation Elite Units. Vol. 9 (First ed.). Oxford: Osprey Publishing. ISBN 978-1-84176-439-9.
- Shores, Christopher; Foreman, John; Ehrengardt, Chris (1992). Fledgling Eagles (First ed.). London: Grub Street. ISBN 978-0-948817-42-7.
- Thomas, Andrew (2002). Gloster Gladiator Aces. Osprey Aircraft of the Aces. Vol. 44 (First ed.). Oxford: Osprey Publishing. ISBN 1-84176-289-X.
- Weal, John (1997). Junkers Ju 87 Stukageschwader 1937–41. Osprey Combat Aircraft. Vol. 1 (First ed.). Oxford: Osprey Publishing. ISBN 978-1-84176-439-9.
