= Shangani =

Shangani may refer to:

- Shangani District, central Mogadishu, Somalia
- Shangani Patrol - also known as Wilson's Last Stand
- Shangani River, Zimbabwe
- Shangani language in Zimbabwe
- Shangani, Zimbabwe, a farming settlement in Zimbabwe
- Shangani people in Mozambique, Zimbabwe and South Africa
- Shangani, Stone Town, a ward of Zanzibar City in Stone Town
