= Frank Reginald Carey =

British World War II flying ace

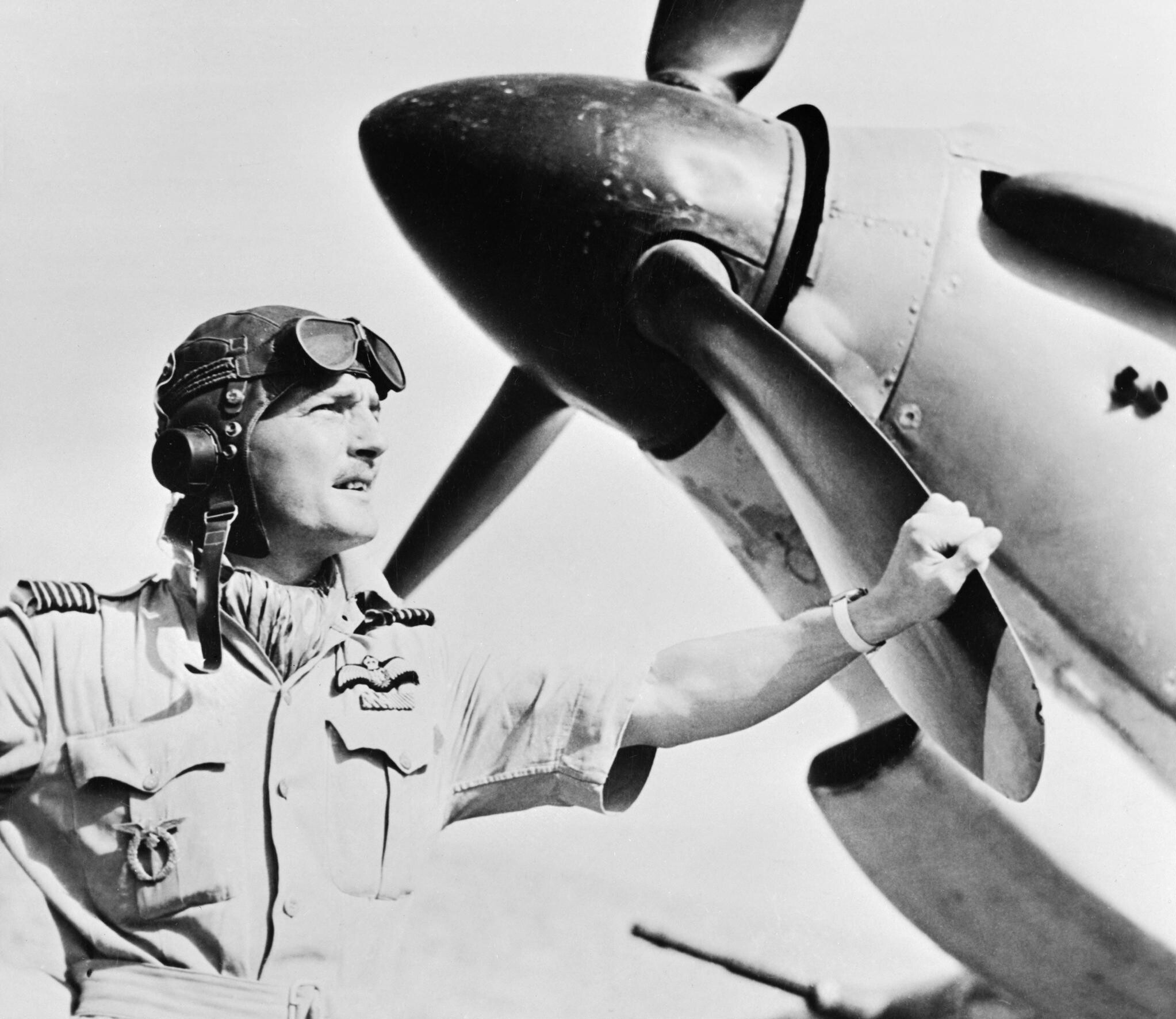
- Carey, with his Hurricane, RAF Amarda Road, India in April 1943.
- Born: 7 May 1912; Brixton, England
- Died: 6 December 2004 (aged 92); Chichester, England
- Military career
- Allegiance: United Kingdom
- Branch: Royal Air Force
- Service years: 1927–1960
- Rank: Group Captain
- Nickname: Chota
- Commands: RAF Honiley (1952–53); No. 135 Wing (1948–49); No. 73 Operational Training Unit (1944–45); No. 165 Wing (1942–43); No. 135 Squadron (1941–42)
- Conflicts: World War II
- Awards: Commander of the Order of the British Empire; Distinguished Flying Cross & Two Bars; Air Force Cross; Distinguished Flying Medal; Silver Star (United States)
- Other work: Rolls-Royce Aero Engine Division

Frank Reginald "Chota" Carey, CBE, DFC & Two Bars, AFC, DFM (7 May 1912 – 6 December 2004) was a Royal Air Force (RAF) fighter pilot and flying ace who served during World War II.

Born in Brixton, London, Carey was educated at Belvedere School before he joined the RAF in September 1927 at the age of 15 as an apprentice metal rigger. After completing the apprenticeship Carey was assigned to No. 43 Squadron RAF based at RAF Tangmere. In 1933 he converted to the role of fitter at RAF Worthy Down. In 1935 he applied to become a fighter pilot and completed the training in 1936. Carey was posted back to 43 Squadron and by 1939 was an established pilot.

At the outbreak of World War II in September 1939 Carey flew defensive patrols over eastern Scotland, where he gained his first successes. He was awarded the Distinguished Flying Medal (DFM) in February 1940 for several shared air victories. Commissioned as pilot officer in April 1940, he transferred to No. 3 Squadron RAF and participated in the Battle of France. In May he was awarded the Distinguished Flying Cross (DFC) for seven enemy aircraft shot down and two probably shot down. On 14 June he received a Bar to the DFC and a promotion to flying officer. From 9 July to 18 August 1940 Carey flew in the Battle of Britain. He accounted for a further nine enemy aircraft destroyed, three probably destroyed, and one damaged but was wounded in July and again in August. His wounds were severe and he took no further part in the battle. In November 1940 he was posted to Operational Training Unit (OTU) 52 as an instructor.

Carey was given command of No. 135 Squadron RAF, as acting squadron leader, in August 1941. In December the squadron began moving to India, with Carey leading the formation against the Japanese invasion of Burma. In February 1942 he was promoted to wing commander and by the end of the year had shot down nine Japanese aircraft. Carey was taken off operations and sent to RAF Amarda Road in India as Air Officer Commanding (AOC) Air Fighting Training Unit 1 in 1943. In November 1944 he was promoted to group captain and left Burma for Egypt as AOC at OTU 73. Carey was mentioned in the 1945 New Year Honours list. In July 1945 he moved to England as Group Captain Tactics at the Central Flying Establishment until the Japanese surrender on 2 September 1945.

Carey was credited with 23 enemy aircraft shot down, six shared destroyed, four unconfirmed destroyed, seven probable, two destroyed on the ground and ten damaged. Of the 23 credited destroyed in air combat, 15 were German and 8 Japanese.

Following World War II he spent two years at Staff College, Camberley and continued his career in the RAF until 1958, when he moved to Australia as Air Adviser to the United Kingdom High Commissioner. Carey retired from the RAF in June 1960 and went to work for the Rolls-Royce Aero Engine Division in Australia. On 3 June 1960 he was appointed a Commander of the Order of the British Empire. After his retirement Carey returned to England and died in Chichester, aged 92.

== Early life and career ==
Frank Reginald Carey was born in Brixton, London on 7 May 1912 to Alfred John Carey (b. 1885) and Elsie Mabel Carey (née Whatson, b. October 1889). Frank was the eldest of three sons—Hugh John (b. 1914) and Roy Gerald (b. 1916). Carey had vague memories of World War I and aviation as a child. During the Zeppelin and German bombing campaign over England his parents strapped a table over his bed to afford the young Frank some protection from bomb fragments. During the war his mother became ill with tuberculosis. The family moved to Lindfield, north of Haywards Heath in Sussex. Alfred hoped the country air would be better for her than the smog-filled London. Elsie succumbed to her condition on 26 November 1924. After her death Alfred pursued his career as a trainee engineer and work as a chauffeur. Alfred set up an ironmongers company soon after, but the Great Depression of 1929 forced Carey senior into bankruptcy.

Carey was educated at Belverdere School, Haywards Heath; a relative paid for the brothers' education there. A former pupil of Belverdere had become a fighter pilot in the Royal Air Force (RAF). The pilot frequently visited the school and performed low fly-pasts in an Armstrong Whitworth Siskin, and this display encouraged Carey to seek a career as a pilot and leave home. Carey's father had remarried and Frank did not get on with his new wife or new step-brothers. The family's finances were in a parlous state and coupled with Frank's poor educational performance, he was prevented from applying to join the RAF immediately.

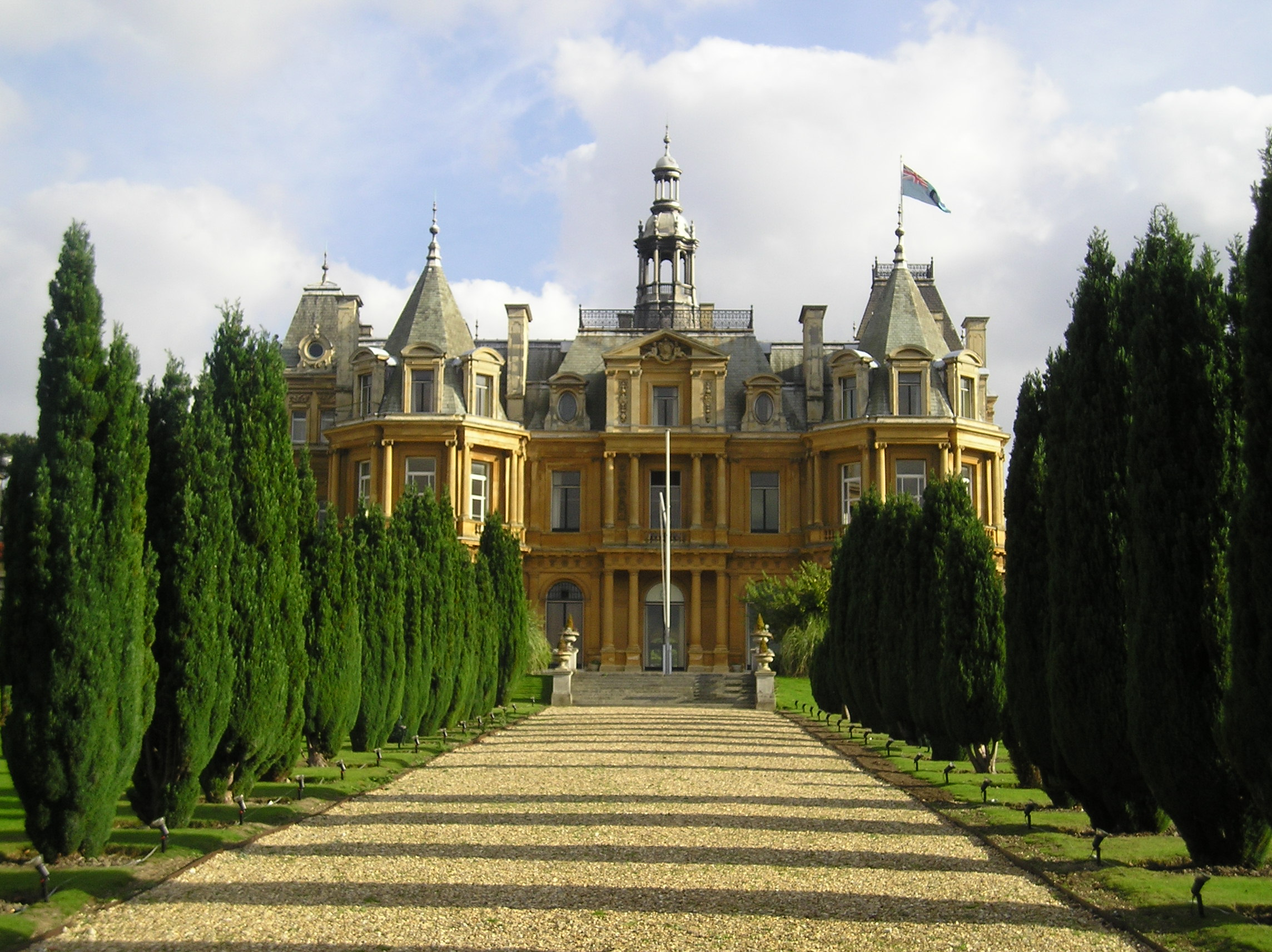
Halton House, Carey's first posting.

Cary found salvation in the Aircraft Apprentice Scheme at Halton House, near Aylesbury and Tring in Buckinghamshire. Lord Trenchard, the Chief of the Air Staff, set up the scheme at RAF Halton which used Halton House as the Officers' Mess. Carey was sometimes assigned to RAF Cranwell until 1926 when the site could take the overwhelming numbers of applicants. With the help of his former headmaster at Lindfield, Carey sat and barely passed the examinations. Carey was lacking in discipline but soon became adept at keeping fit and lean. At the end of the three-year course he finished 227th out of a class of 419, and just qualified with an overall grade of 65 per cent. Mathematics, Science, Engineering and English was rated at 59.9 per cent. General service was marked 57 per cent and his technical knowledge was rated at 73 per cent. He was accepted into the RAF in September 1927 as an airframe fitter. His tutors noted he had not attained a trainee non-commissioned officer rank and was not likely to be fit for command.

In 1930 Carey was posted to No. 43 Squadron RAF based at RAF Tangmere near Chichester, West Sussex. After serving for one year and improving his technical grade, Carey was posted to RAF Worthy Down near Winchester where he spent most of his time in the workshops rebuilding and servicing Napier Lion engines. In 1935, after several applications, he was selected for pilot training. He was sent to No. 6 Flying Training School at Netheravon in Wiltshire. Little of Carey's flight training is known since his logbook was lost. Carey passed out as a Sergeant pilot, rejoining 43 Squadron, now flying the Hawker Fury. While in Wiltshire he met his first wife, Kathleen Ivy Steele. They were married at Winchester Registry office on 1 July 1936 and moved to a house in Arundel.

Carey arrived at Tangmere on 30 November 1936. Carey's 5-foot 3-inch frame earned him the nickname Chota ("little one"), a name absorbed by the RAF from its time in India. Carey flew the Bristol Bulldog, Gloster Gauntlet and Hawker Demon biplane fighters. In August 1936 Caesar Hull joined the squadron. Hull was also to become a fighter ace in World War II. The squadron competed at Sutton Bridge in January 1937 for the Sir Philip Sassoon Flight Attack Challenge Trophy. On 26 June 1937 Carey participated in the Hendon Air Displays. In June 1938 Peter Townsend was assigned to the squadron. In August 1938 the squadron was sent to Northern Ireland, No. 2 Armament Training Station for gunnery training before it returned to Tangmere to re-equip with the Hawker Hurricane monoplane. From August 1938 to September 1939 the squadron carried out exercises that were consistent with pre-war presumptions that the Luftwaffe would attack across the North Sea with unescorted bombers. The exercises were flown with the French Armée de l'air. On 5 August an exercise which simulated the attack of 1,300 German bombers took place over eastern England. By this time Carey had amassed at least 600 hours on the Fury alone.

== Second World War ==
On 1 September 1939 Germany invaded Poland. Britain declared war on 3 September 1939 beginning the war in Europe. As the Germans defeated Poland, the Western Allies adopted a defensive posture and the period September 1939 – April 1940 was known as the Phoney War. After war was declared 43 Squadron remained in England but moved to RAF Acklington north of Newcastle upon Tyne on 18 November 1939. The unit now formed part of No. 13 Group RAF which was responsible for the air defence of northern Britain. The winter, 1939–1940 was particularly severe but no enemy activity was observed by the squadron.

On 29 January 1940 Flight Lieutenant Caesar Hull led a section of 43 Squadron to intercept an unidentified aircraft caught on radar. Ten miles south-west of Hartlepool at 90:45 GMT, they engaged a Heinkel He 111 bomber of 6. Staffel Kampfgeschwader 26 (4./KG 26). It was one of nine He 111s that had separated from its formation upon reaching the English coast. Hull, Carey and Pilot Officer H. L. North fired at it as they chased it out over the sea. They observed no results and returned to base. Hull found a bullet hole in his Hurricane upon landing. On 30 January Frank and Hull were on patrol near Coquet Island. They intercepted 26 He 111s from KG 26 that were targeting merchant shipping and fishing boats. The German bombers were flying at low altitude just below the cloud line at approximately 1,000 ft. This tactic enabled the German bomber pilot to easily escape into the cloud if spotted. The two pilots dropped to sea-level and engaged an enemy unseen. The He 111, from, 4./KG 26, crashed into the sea. Pilot Feldwebel Helmut Höfner were posted missing in action. The observer was confirmed to have been killed in action when his body was recovered. Carey attempted to use his gun camera to record the Heinkel as it sank nose-first on the water but it failed to work.

The Luftwaffe persisted with raids on the north-east coast of England. On 3 February it committed 24 He 111s from KG 26 and a pair of Junkers Ju 88s from Kampfgeschwader 30. Carey took off with a section of 43 Squadron—a number of sections from the squadron had already scrambled— at 11:15. They intercepted He 111s bombing ships 15 miles off Tynemouth. Carey and his wingman, Sergeant Peter Ottewill engaged and downed a He 111, although it took the combined ammunition of both Hurricanes to do so. Ottewill headed off the He 111 while Carey attacked. When the German pilot attempted to climb for cloud cover, Ottewill joined the attack. The Heinkel landed on the sea with both engines stopped and sank. The pilot, Oberfeldwebel Fritz Wiemer, was later rescued and became a prisoner of war. The remainder died in a field hospital. The German attack sank three ships—Alexandria, the Tempo (Norwegian 629 GRT ) and the Greek Nicolau Zografia near the Farne Islands. Three He 111s were lost according to a German radio broadcast.

Carey was awarded the Distinguished Flying Medal (DFM) on 21 February 1940 for this action. The DFM was Gazetted on 1 March. On 28 March German bombers raided shipping around the Northern Isles, Orkney and Shetland. A lone He 111 was spotted and Carey, Hull and Sergeant Ottewill crippled the bomber which began to burn. The pilot abandoned any escape attempts, turned toward the coast and prepared to crash-land. At that moment 605 Squadron arrived and shot the Heinkel down into the sea; there were no survivors. On 31 March 1940 Carey was promoted to flight sergeant. The following day, 1 April 1940 (22nd birthday of the RAF), he received his commission with promotion to pilot officer. Carey was reassigned to No. 3 Squadron RAF on 2 April 1940. He flew to RAF Kenley in Surrey and spent a week on leave. Then 3 Squadron relocated to RAF Manston. At Manston Air Officer Commanding (AOC) No. 11 Group RAF, Keith Park, personally presented Carey with the DFM on 1 May 1940.

=== France and Low countries ===
On 10 May 1940 the German Wehrmacht began Fall Gelb (Case Yellow); an invasion of Luxembourg, The Netherlands, Belgium and France. 3 Squadron were ordered to readiness that morning and flew to Merville, Nord in France. 3 and 79 Squadron were to form part of 63 Wing RAF. As they crossed the English Channel at 05:30 GMT, they were directed to a Ju 88 which they chased to the Dutch border without success and returned to England to refuel. After landing the squadron was ordered to relocate to France. They were told the German Army had invaded France and the Low Countries. They reached Merville and found they were under-equipped in comparison to other squadrons that had been there since September 1939. The squadrons of the RAF Advanced Air Striking Force (AASF) possessed self-sealing fuel tanks, armoured protection for the pilot, and more powerful radio crystals.

Merville had already been bombed. Over the course of the day the squadron engaged the Luftwaffe whenever they took off. At 19:30 GMT 3 squadron engaged He 111s from III./Kampfgeschwader 54 which were bombing the marshalling yards in Lille. 85 and 605 Squadrons had already been in action with the formation. The bombers were not protected and Carey claimed three destroyed and two damaged. He was officially credited with only two destroyed, his first solo victories. In the fading light the squadron intercepted another He 111 formation, this time from I./Kampfgeschwader 27. Carey was credited with one destroyed. Two claims were made but the squadron lost two Hurricanes from accurate return fire but pilots survived. According to Carey's combat report, the radios were useless and pilots had to act independently and not as a fighting unit. The air battles in this sector on 10 May 1940 had cost 8./KG 54 six He 111s plus another damaged. Stab./Lehrgeschwader 1 lost four aircraft and one damaged. II. and III./KG 27 lost two shot down and four damaged. One 607 and two 85 Squadron Hurricanes force-landed after being hit by return fire.

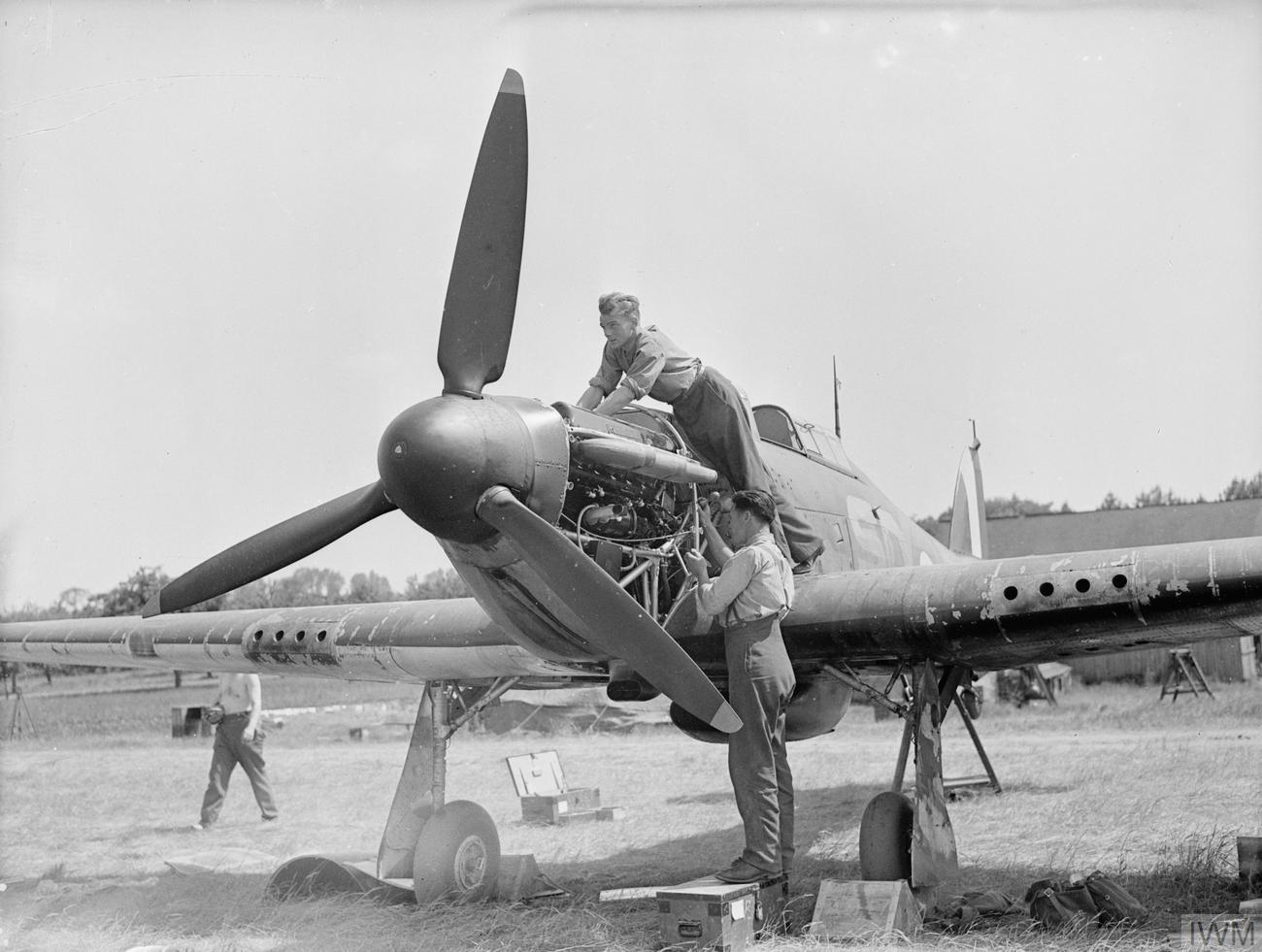
Hurricane undergoing maintenance, France, 1940.

On 11 May a Bristol Bombay crashed near the airfield. It was carrying spare parts and their loss effected the squadron operational readiness, leaving most of the squadron grounded. Later that day Carey conducted a lone patrol to Lille and Douai and spotted three unescorted He 111s but all were shot down by another squadron before he could get into position. In the afternoon, in the same sector, he dispatched a Stab./KG 54 (Command squadron) He 111. Three airmen were captured and two were killed. On the ground the situation was rapidly deteriorating in Belgium. Belgian border defences were breached by 11 May and German forces were advancing on Hannut and Gembloux. On 12 May 3 Squadron flew air superiority support for the French 1st Army at the Battle of Hannut (12 May–14 May). Carey flew four missions—his first in the Battle of Belgium. He flew one over Hannut where the squadron met heavy anti-aircraft artillery fire but no enemy aircraft. Another patrol over Louvain yielded the same result. On a later sortie, south of Brussels, 3 Squadron intercepted 12 He 111s and Carey claimed one destroyed and one probably destroyed. 3 Squadron lost Flying Officer D. Ball who was probably shot down by a Bf 109 from Jagdgeschwader 21 and died of his wounds in a German hospital. (Note: Brian Cull, Bruce Lander and Heinrich Weiss assert Ball died on 4 June 1940. Norman Franks, Carey's biographer states his death in captivity occurred on 6 July 1940.)

On 13 May over Belgium, Carey claimed six enemy aircraft, qualifying him as an "ace in a day". 3 Squadron continued their support for the British and Belgian Army in central Belgium. 3 Squadron intercepted 60 Junkers Ju 87 Stukas from I./Sturzkampfgeschwader 2 (StG 2) escorted by Messerschmitt Bf 109 fighters. Carey claimed two Ju 87s from seven filed by 3 Squadron. StG 2 did not lose as many Ju 87s as 3 Squadron assumed. On 13 May I./StG 2 lost one Ju 87 destroyed. Another from 7.StG 2 was also lost to Hurricanes. II./StG 2 lost another in combat with Hurricanes. In the same combat Carey also accounted for a Dornier Do 17. Later in the day Carey claimed a He 111 destroyed and another shared destroyed from another unescorted formation. After the encounter his flight attacked five Henschel Hs 123 biplanes and Carey claimed one shot down.

On 14 May 1940 Carey flew his last patrol in the campaign. While leading a section of Hurricanes over the front, Carey spotted a lone Westland Lysander and flew down to it to show the pilot they were friendly fighters. As he did so he noted a Do 17 some 3,000 ft above. Carey climbed, attacked and hit the Dornier which half-rolled, dived and then crashed. As Carey pursued it down the German gunner hit his Hurricane with several bursts and the fighter caught fire. One round hit him in the knee and another had passed between his legs and hit the parachute pack. Regardless, Carey quickly decided to bale out. The parachute snagged on the cockpit "hood" and because of the slipstream he had difficulty in moving his good leg out of the cockpit. The delay enabled Carey to stay with the aircraft long enough to notice the dive had put out the fire and Carey opted for a crash-landing instead. Carey abandoned the Hurricane in a field, but took maps and identification documents with him fearing he might be in enemy territory. He elected not to destroy the Hurricane. Carey landed near Hamme, Belgium, and was picked up by a Belgian Army patrol. The German aircraft had also crashed nearby and its occupants were taken prisoner. From 14 to 20 May, in Carey's absence, 3 Squadron lost four killed, one captured and one badly wounded. Aside from the six losses, four Hurricanes force-landed and another two were damaged.

Carey was eventually taken to No. 26 Aircraft Depot in southern France, where other wounded aircrew were brought to recover and then rejoin their units. After days of inactivity and confusion as the Allied forces collapsed, Carey and the other personnel found a serviceable Bristol Bombay transport at a nearby airfield and flew it back to RAF Hendon from Nantes on 7 June. Carey acted as rear-gunner for the trip. On arrival in England he found he had been officially posted as missing in action. By the time Carey reached England, the bulk of Allied air and land forces had been defeated. On the same day he was wounded in action the Luftwaffe bombed Rotterdam and the Dutch surrendered. Throughout that day the Allied bomber force tried to prevent the Germans crossing the Meuse at Sedan. The air battles over Sedan destroyed Allied air power in France. On 20 May the German Army reached the Channel coast. The British Expeditionary Force was evacuated from Dunkirk and the port city fell in June. Belgium surrendered on 28 May and in the first week of June the Wehrmacht began Fall Rot to complete the conquest of France, ending in the French surrender on 25 June.

=== Battle of Britain ===
Carey was awarded the Distinguished Flying Cross (DFC) and bar for his actions in France. The awards were made simultaneously and appeared in the London Gazette on 31 May 1940. Following a week of leave, he re-joined 43 Squadron at Tangmere on 24 June 1940. The squadron was now about to participate in the Battle of Britain. The Luftwaffe began an air campaign to gain air superiority as a prelude to an amphibious invasion, Operation Sea Lion. The Germans began a series of anti-shipping operations which they referred to as the Kanalkampf.

On 1 July the squadron flew reconnaissance escort to Abbeville on 1 July. The next few days were inactive, the squadron was only called upon to shoot down barrage balloons that had come loose and drifted. On 9 July the squadron was scrambled to intercept a raid near the Isle of Wight and intercepted Messerschmitt Bf 110 heavy fighters from III./Zerstorergeschwader 26 (Destroyer Wing 26). The Hurricanes attacked head on and the Bf 110s used their powerful forward armament to their advantage. Carey's Squadron leader, George Lott, was hit and blinded. He baled out of the burning Hurricane and was later awarded the DFC. Lott did not fly on operations again. Carey claimed one Bf 110 damaged but in fact two Bf 110s from the unit failed to return. A third was damaged but its gunner baled out leaving the pilot to fly home alone. Another 43 squadron pilot, Pilot Officer J. Cruttenden, crashed unhurt to unknown causes later in the evening. Lott was replaced by John V. C. Badger.

On 18 July Carey flew several missions. He was vectored by ground-control onto the intruder by Chain Home Radio Direction Finding (RDF) facilities. The RDF sent a report to the main operations room of Fighter Command Headquarters at RAF Bentley Priory. After determining it was hostile, they ordered the operations room, staffed by Women's Auxiliary Air Force (WAAF) personnel, to plot the course allowing the Fighter Controller at Group Headquarters to guide RAF fighters to the approximate location of the enemy. On this occasion the interception went well until the German pilot was able to escape into a large layer of cloud and flee to France.

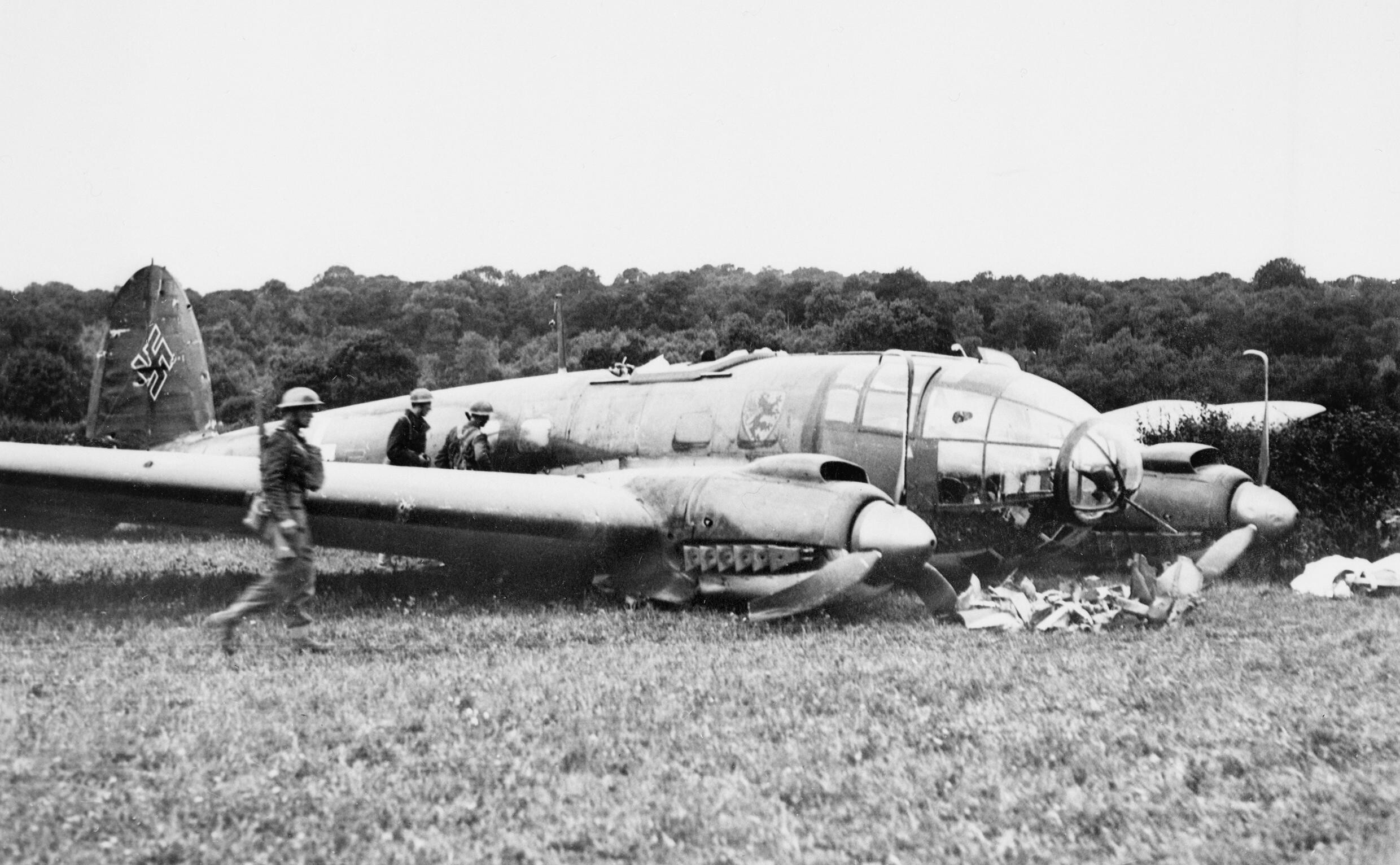
He 111 from KG 55 shot down by 43 Squadron, 12 July 1940. Carey shot down six.

The following day, 19 July, Carey scrambled on three occasions and participated in two patrols covering Allied shipping in the Channel. On the fourth sortie he was scrambled at 16:55 to intercept enemy aircraft off Selsey Bill. The squadron engaged Bf 109s from III./Jagdgeschwader 27. During the engagement Carey claimed to have scored hits on two and to have shot down one. It is possible Carey's victim was Leutnant Erbo Graf von Kageneck who was wounded. The battle had been expensive. Two 43 Squadron Hurricanes were lost. Flight Lieutenant John W. C. Simpson was wounded and bailed out of Hurricane P3140 with an injured foot. He broke a collar bone as he collided with a garden fence. Sergeant J. A. Buck was killed after he baled out. Carey heard him radio that he was wounded in the leg and intended to parachute out. Buck's body was later washed onto the beach; he had apparently drowned. (Note: Buck's brother, Flight Lieutenant H. A Buck, died in action on 27 April 1945.) In his combat report, Carey stated that he followed his victim down through cloud and observed oil and wreckage on the water—but this was probably Simpson's Hurricane. Kageneck was the only loss admitted by the Germans. He managed to return to France wounded. No mention of Kageneck's damaged Bf 109 was made in German records.

On the night of 22/23 July Carey was on night patrol when raiders were reported. Although he made no interceptions he observed a Dornier Do 17 of 2./Kampfgeschwader 3 crash in flames south of Brighton. Leutnant Kahlfuss and his crew were rescued wounded. It was shot down by a Bristol Blenheim night fighter of the Fighter Interception Unit (FIU). Carey was able to confirm the victory for Pilot Officer G. E. Morris, Sergeant R. H. Leyland and Flying Officer G. Ashfield. It was the first recorded victory of British aircraft interception (AI) radar. The Blenheim had been fitted with an experimental AI Mk. IV radar set and it was the first instance in history of air-to-air radar resulting in one aircraft shooting down another, which revolutionised the concept of night fighting in air warfare.

On 8 August the Luftwaffe sent a large formation of Ju 87s and Bf 109s supported by Bf 110s to destroy the British convoy PEWITT. The convoy had been mauled through the morning but a renewed attempt was made to destroy it in the afternoon. 145 Squadron along with 43 Squadron were scrambled to defend the convoy. The battle commenced just after 16:00. Three 145 Hurricanes were lost with their pilots in action with the Bf 110s while a further three were lost from 43 Squadron. Of the six pilots, five were killed. From 43 Squadron Pilot Officers J. R. S. Oelofse and J. Cruttenden were killed and Sergeant H. C. Upton survived. Three Sturzkampfgeschwader 77 machines fell to 145. Four were damaged in combat with 43 Squadron; two were 70% and 80% damaged. V./Lehrgeschwader 1 suffered two damaged Bf 110s. Three Bf 109s from II./JG 27 were lost, two falling to 43 Squadron. A further fighter was damaged. The attack had failed to register a direct hit and none of the ships were sunk. Carey's was one of the 43 Squadron Hurricanes damaged in the battle.

Carey's Squadron Leader had ordered him to cover the squadron with just three other pilots. A large number of escorting Bf 109s engaged his three-man section. Carey was able to get into firing positions several times before a Bf 110 hit him with cannon fire. The round hit the port wing and exploded the ammunition stored there, causing a large hole. The Hurricane turned onto its back and Carey noticed blood seeping from his hands and arm. He corrected the attitude of the aircraft and succeeded in attacking a flight of Bf 109s from astern and hit one but was again attacked and hit by a Bf 110 which shot off his rudder and one elevator. The fight had taken him near to Cherbourg and he decided to extract himself and fly to Tangmere. The Hurricane, P3202, was later repaired. 43 Squadron's tormentors in the battle were probably from V./LG 1. Carey described the raid as "so terrible" and "inextricable", that it was "like trying to stop a Steamroller".

On 12 August the Luftwaffe attacked the naval base at Portsmouth. Kampfgeschwader 51 put 100 Junkers Ju 88s into the operation. They were covered by 120 Bf 110s from Zerstorergeschwader 26 and Zerstorergeschwader 76. 25 Bf 109s from Jagdgeschwader 53 provided escort while Jagdgeschwader 54 covered the withdrawal. 48 Hurricanes from Tangmere, Middle Wallop, Warmwell and Exeter were sent to intercept. The armada swept through a gap in the barrage balloon defence and damaged the naval base, railway yards and fuel storage tanks which killed 96. Nine Ju 88s were shot down. Carey likely accounted for a Ju 88 of II./KG 51 whose crew were killed when it crashed near the city. German records show the loss of 13 Ju 88s, 8 Bf 110s and 10 Bf 109s in combat. Fighter Command lost seven Hurricanes and two Spitfires destroyed. 43 Squadron suffered no casualties.

The following day, the Germans began Adlertag (Eagle Day), a concentrated effort to destroy airbases in south east England. Carey was in action throughout the day claiming one Ju 88 destroyed, two damaged and one probably destroyed that morning.

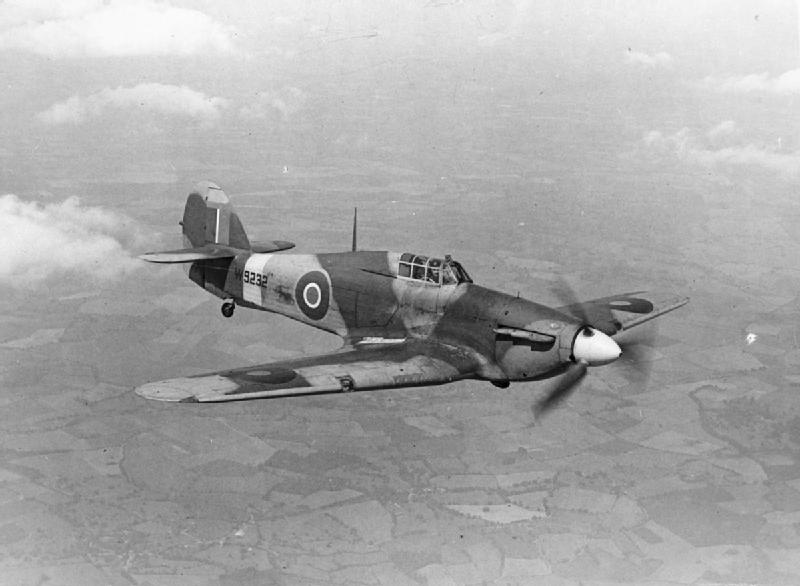
Carey flew the Hurricane Mark I.

Two days later, on 15 August—noted for the intensity and scale of combat—the Luftwaffe carried out effective attacks from Portland to Martlesham. At 17:00 43 squadron were scrambled with 249, 601 and 609 squadrons to intercept a large raid approaching Southampton. 43 Squadron and 234 Squadron made a sighting off Portland to south-east of the Isle of Wight. The raid consisted of 60 Ju 88s from LG 1 and 40 Bf 110s from Zerstörergeschwader 2 (ZG 2), led by Oberstleutnant Friedrich Vollbracht. The Ju 88s broke through to RAF Middle Wallop and RAF Worthy Down but caused little damage. 4./LG 1, led by Hauptmann Joachim Helbig, lost five of seven Ju 88s to 601 Squadron. Carey accounted for one shared Ju 88 destroyed. LG 1 lost eight Ju 88s on the mission. One of the Bf 110 escorts was brought down and 43 Squadron suffered no loss but 234 Squadron lost two pilots and 601 lost two fighters with a badly burned pilot.

The following day 1, 43 and 601 Squadrons intercepted Ju 87s from StG 2 and Bf 110s from III./ZG 76 on their way to attack Tangmere—43's home airfield. Supermarine Spitfires from 602 Squadron engaged Bf 109s from Jagdgeschwader 2. The British fighters could not stop the Ju 87s inflicting heavy damage on the airfield's buildings and facilities. The FIU lost three Bristol Blenheim night fighters and several damaged. Seven Hurricanes and several Spitfires were written off. 14 serviceman, six civilians were killed and 41 injured. In return 12 Ju 87s were shot down and so were four Bf 110s. 43 accounted for 10 of the 12 Ju 87s. Two Bf 109s were also shot down and one damaged. In covering 43 Squadron, 1 Squadron lost a Hurricane and two damaged with one pilot wounded. 601 lost one pilot killed. 43 lost two Hurricanes with both pilots wounded. Carey claimed two Ju 87s destroyed and two probably destroyed.

On 18 August 1940, a date known as The Hardest Day, Carey flew his last mission in the battle. At 13:59, Poling radar station picked up the German formations and reported them as 80-strong. Smaller forces ranging from 9 to 20-plus represented the German fighters moving up behind it. The British estimated the Luftwaffe attack force to be 150-aircraft strong. It was an underestimation by half. 10 Group and 11 Group alerted their units from their operations rooms at Uxbridge and Box in Wiltshire. No. 10 and 11 Groups dispatched more Squadrons to support the already airborne 11 Hurricanes from No. 601 Squadron. 10 Group dispatched one Squadron each from Middle Wallop, Exeter and Warmwell, and one each from Tangmere and RAF Westhampnett. The RAF order of battle included; nine Hurricanes of 43 Squadron RAF, led by Carey patrolling Thorney Island; 602 protected Westhampnett with 12 Spitfires; 152 and 11 Spitfires patrolled Portsmouth air space; 234 Squadron with 11 Spitfires over the Isles of Wight to engage the attackers; 213 with 12 Hurricanes which were to move 80 miles eastward from Exeter and patrol St. Catherine's Point. Finally, 609 Squadron and 12 Spitfires remained in reserve around Middle Wallop to meet any unexpected German moves.

43 Squadron engaged and Carey shot down a Ju 87 of I./StG 77 but was hit in the knee by a stray bullet. Due to enemy action he could not land at Tangmere airfield and had to crash-land his Hurricane at Pulborough. Six Ju 87s fell to 43 Squadron in this battle. Carey was the only 43 pilot injured. No other Hurricane of the squadron was damaged. The fate of Carey's mount—Hurricane R4109—is disputed. One source alleges it was destroyed in the crash, another states the machine was repaired and written off in a training flight on 18 March 1941. The day was a major success for Fighter Command and Carey was the RAF's only major casualty; two pilots from 601 Squadron were also killed in this battle. 16 Ju 87s had been destroyed and two more severely damaged upon crash-landing in France. The cost had been three RAF fighters destroyed and eight damaged.

After medical treatment in Chichester and recuperation Carey was posted back to 43 Squadron but did not fly again for a month. The squadron suffered increasing casualties as the battle wore on. Squadron Leader Badger baled out on 30 August wounded and later died on 30 June 1941. On 7 September 1940 Frank was lunching with other pilots at Tangmere's mess that afternoon while the Adjutant took pictures of the semi-formal gathering sitting in deck chairs and drinking from tankards. That same after noon, Caesar Hull and two other pilots were killed when the Luftwaffe began its first deliberate attack on London, initiating The Blitz. Morale sank and the squadron was sent north to Newcastle to rest on 8 September. Thomas Dalton-Morgan took command of 43 Squadron at Newcastle and Carey flew again for the first time on 23 September 1940 and was promoted to Flight commander, but the squadron remained in the north until the end of the Battle of Britain in October 1940. On 20 January 1941 Carey and another pilot (Pilot Officer Tufnell) chased a Ju 88 out over the North Sea and claimed it damaged before it escaped into cloud.

=== Far East ===
On 20 February 1941, having flown 1,161 hours and 45 minutes, Carey left 43 Squadron for his new posting to a No. 52 Operational Training Unit at RAF Debden as an instructor with other well-known pilots such as Count Manfred Beckett Czernin. The unit boasted 60 Hurricanes and 25 training machines. They also offered training courses on American types. On 1 April 1941, he was confirmed in the rank of pilot officer and promoted to Flying officer (war substantive). On 26 June 1941 Carey participated in a mock dogfight with the then unknown future American aces Hubert Zemke and later John R. Alison to test the Curtiss P-40 Warhawk. After a few idle months, Carey was posted to Ballyhalbert, near Belfast as flight commander with No. 245 Squadron RAF on 25 July 1941. On 25 August, he was posted to RAF Baginton to form No. 135 Squadron RAF, as acting Squadron leader. 135 had formed ten days earlier on 15 August. Carey was promoted to flight lieutenant (war substantive) on 23 November 1941 while in command.

Originally intended for service in the Middle East, Carey and 135 Squadron were diverted to Burma in December. Most of the squadron boarded transport ships on 6 December the day before the Empire of Japan attack on Pearl Harbor, which started the Pacific War and brought the United States into the conflict. At Free Town, Sierra Leone, Carey boarded a Douglas DC-2 and flew to Takoradi in Ghana with the senior staff, leaving the rest of the squadron to sail on. From there, they flew in a Douglas DC-3 to Khartoum. On the way across Carey flew the aircraft but became the butt of a practical joke when the men kept moving up and down the aircraft to upset its centre of gravity which forced an irritated Carey to keep trimming the elevators. From there a flight in a Short Empire to Cairo was taken in order to report to Air Force Headquarters. Staging through Dubai and Calcutta Carey reached Burma. On 19 December the squadron reached Durban, South Africa and on 24 December set sail for Bombay, India arriving on 6 January 1942. The squadron finally reached Rangoon, Burma on 19 January 1942 in the middle of an air raid.

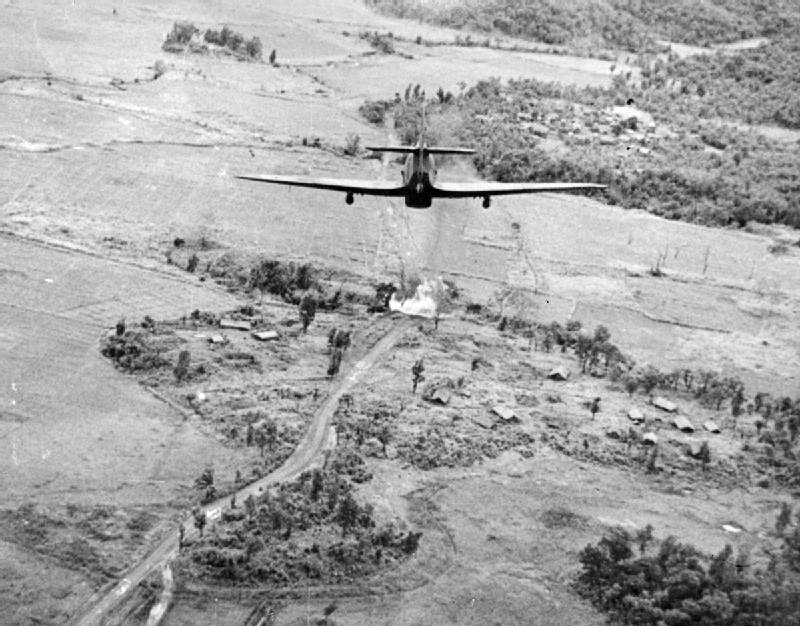
Hurricane attacking ground targets in Burma.

The Imperial Japanese Navy and Imperial Japanese Army inflicted a series of defeats on American and British Empire forces. On the British front (South-East Asian Theatre), the Japanese achieved success. By the third week of January 1942, Hong Kong had been captured by Japanese forces and the British Army was edging towards a disastrous defeat in the Malayan Campaign. In mid-February 1942, the Battle of Singapore ended in the largest surrender of British forces in history. Simultaneously the Japanese invaded Burma and decisively defeated the Royal Navy, during the Indian Ocean Raid in March–April 1942.

Into this, 135 Squadron were thrust with few aircraft, spares and enormous logistics challenges. Carey set up the airfield at Zayatkwin and flew his first combat with No. 136 Squadron RAF on 26 January 1942 because his own did not possess any Hurricanes. The newer Hurricane Mk IIBs, equipped with twelve machine guns, offered an improvement in gunpower to the previous variants. On 28 January 135 moved to RAF airfield at Mingaladon Township and the following day engaged in combat with the enemy for the first time. During the air battle Carey claimed a Nakajima Ki-27 Nate' from the 77th Sentai ("77th Fighter Unit") (Note: An Imperial Japanese Army sentai was made up of two to four chūtai (squadrons)) over Mingaladon. The battle took place in 6/10th cumulus cloud cover at approximately 5,000 ft (1,500 m). Major Hirose led the attack on the Hurricanes, supported by a number of P-40 Kittyhawks from an American unit. Carey shot down a Ki-27 with his first burst of fire. Two P-40s were lost and one pilot wounded. They claimed 12 enemy aircraft while the RAF pilots claimed two. The 77th Sentai lost four Ki-27s.

On 30 January 1942 Carey's flight was attacked by Ki-27s over Mingaladon; Pilot Officer Kitley's Hurricane had the aerial shot off by an enemy fighter but Carey and the rest of the flight failed to see the attack and all returned to base. On 6 February 1942 Carey was promoted to acting wing commander on the 267 Wing. In February Carey led frequent bomber escort sorties and ground-attack missions. On 23 February 1942 he engaged in combat again, shooting down a Mitsubishi Ki-51 'Sonia' reconnaissance aircraft over Kayaikto.

On 24 February Carey flew a ground attack mission at the Japanese-held airfield Raheng. Carey claimed a Ki-27 and an unidentified transport shot down as they took off. Japanese records show only one Ki-27 and it is not certain any Japanese transport units were based there. They may have been a Mitsubishi Ki-57 or possibly a Nakajima Ki-34. Carey's last victory for some months was achieved on 26 February 1942. Carey shot down a Nakajima Ki-43 Hayabusa, one of several making a landing circuit over Moulmein. In this action Carey was saved by his wingman Glop Underwood who shot down a Ki-43 as it closed on him. In turn Underwood was then shot down and captured. The Japanese fighters were from the 50th and 77th Sentai which recorded the loss of one and four damaged. Losses for the 77th are unknown. The American units claimed two on the ground and 11 in the air. Carey claimed three enemy aircraft in the air and two on the ground which were either Ki-27s or Ki-43s.

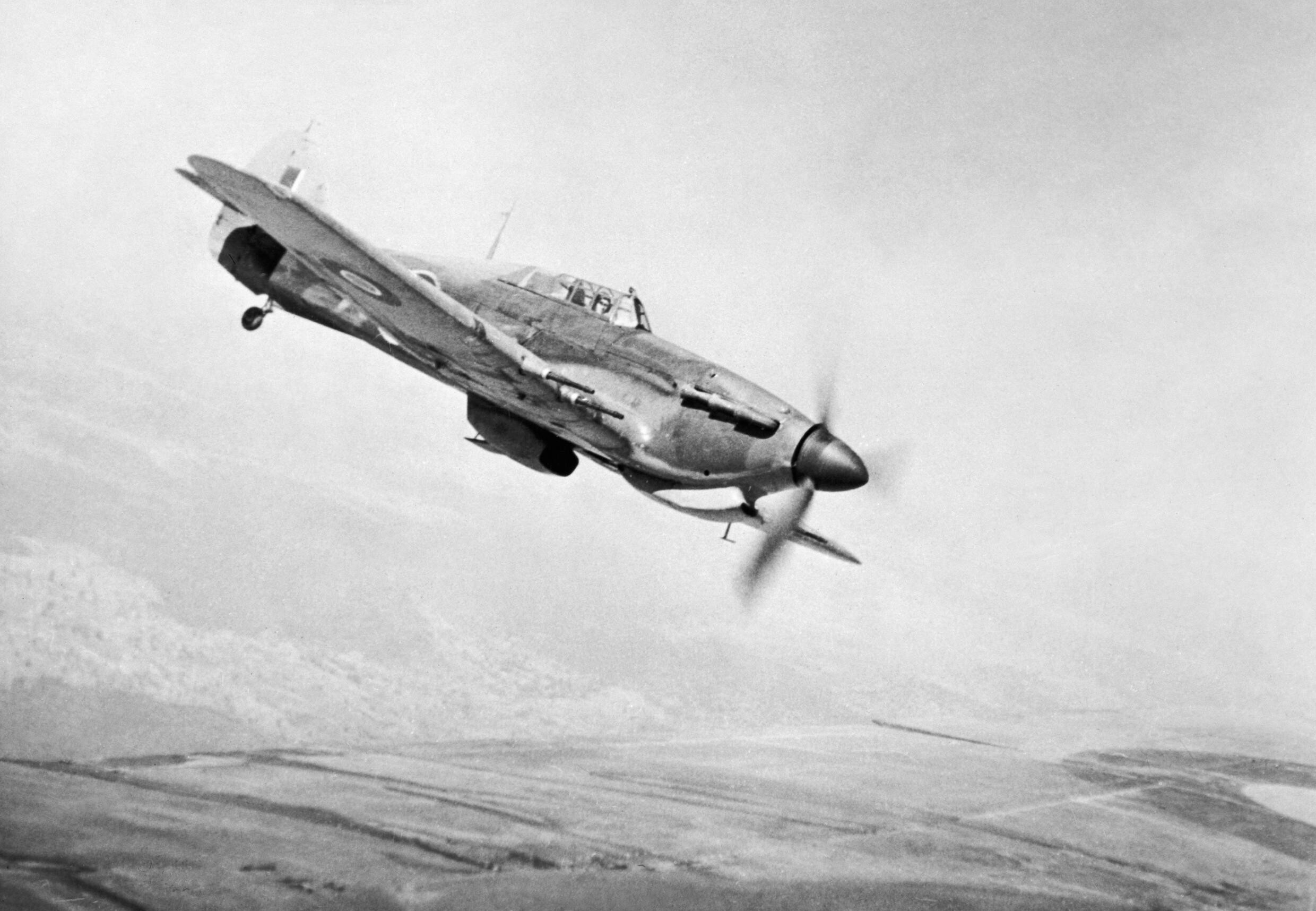
Hurricane IIC of 166 Wing over Burma. Carey commanded 165 Wing

The RAF units near Rangoon retreated as the British withdrew from the city on 7 March 1942. Carey and the remnants of the British fighter forces flew to Magway. Carey was ordered to fly to Calcutta to garner supplies and reinforcements. Unable to take one of the few, and now precious Hurricanes, he found an old Tiger Moth instead. Carey and a junior pilot flew it to Akyab. Upon reaching the airfield Carey found a Vickers Victoria. He sent the young pilot back with the Moth while he completed his journey in the Victoria, now crammed with the families of Indian Army officers fleeing the Japanese advance. Carey learned that the mission was fruitless. In his absence the Magway base had been bombed and all the Hurricanes had been lost. He ordered the wing to retreat into China. Carey received the bar to his DFC while in Calcutta. It was gazetted on 24 March 1942. For the rest of 1942, Carey and his wing remained based in India, ready to contest Japanese aerial incursions. On the ground, the frontline had stabilised and the squadron received a handful of Hurricanes.

Japanese patrols were infrequent and Carey scrambled only three time in June 1942. In July the squadron received the Hurricane IICs armed with the more powerful 20mm Hispano cannon. On 11 September 1942 Carey was flying a high altitude patrol at 25,000 feet when his engine failed and force landed back at the airfield. On 12 October 1942 Carey was promoted to officer commanding 165 Wing RAF at Dum Dum airfield.

The RAF units in Burma moved to Arakan on 24 October. Intelligence suggested the Japanese army would strike up the coast of Burma to reach India. The Japanese began their first Arakan campaign in December 1942. On 25 October Carey was credited with one Ki-43 destroyed in a rare instance of air combat. In the evening of 26 October Carey was sitting in the cockpit refuelling near Cox's Bazar aerodrome when 27 Ki-43s swept overhead. In the heat of the moment Carey decided to take off. The Japanese sighted the Hurricane and Carey began manoeuvres to present an awkward target. Carey headed away from Japanese lines and eventually, after a long chase, they broke off for want of fuel and Carey landed without incident, having not been hit by enemy fire.

=== Air training ===
165 Wing were moved to Chittagong on 24 December 1942 without notable success. The command proved to be Carey's last as a combat leader. Carey was relieved of his command in January 1943 and the following month was appointed AOC of Air Fighting Training Unit responsible for all tactical training for RAF pilots in south-east Asia at RAF Amarda Road.

Carey was granted leave and returned to Britain on 13 June 1943 on 13 different flights, arriving on 24 June. After a stay with family, he attended the Central Gunnery School at RAF Sutton Bridge, which he completed in September 1943. While in Britain, Carey trained on the Supermarine Spitfire, Hawker Typhoon and North American P-51 Mustang which he expected to equip the training unit.

When arrived back in India on 27 September began training personnel in tactics with these aircraft so would be able to use them to the full advantage in gaining air superiority over the Japanese in the upcoming fighting in Burma

In December 1943 Amarda Road became the training school for the RAF Third Tactical Air Force established on 28 December. In April 1944, the Republic P-47 Thunderbolt arrived to replace the ageing Hurricane in the close air support role. At this time, Carey also undertook training of United States Army Air Force pilots, tutoring them in air tactics specific to dealing with Japanese air and land targets. Thomas Williams, deputy, AOC Eastern Air Command at Air Command South East Asia, wrote to congratulate him on the effectiveness of his training courses which were well received by American airmen.

On 2 November 1944 he was posted to command 73 Operational Training Unit (OTU) in Egypt as a group captain. Carey most flew Spitfires and P-47s in Egypt to prepare pilots for operations in the Italian campaign. This ended with the Axis surrender in May 1945. Carey took possession of an all-black P-47 with a red line down the fuselage to mark him out in mock-air battles. On 1 January 1945 Air Marshal Guy Garrod, AOC RAF Mediterranean and Middle East awarded Carey the Air Force Cross for his leadership in India and Burma. He was then mentioned in the New Year's Honours List 1945. On 10 June 1945, Carey was appointed to RAF Tangmere as officer commanding tactics for the Central Fighter Establishment. Carey took part in the September 1945 flypast to commemorate the fifth anniversary of the Battle of Britain, since continued by Battle of Britain Memorial Flight, and the surrender of Japan ending the war.

== Post-war ==
Carey was given a permanent commission in the rank of squadron leader on 1 September 1945. Carey was commissioned to the rank of wing commander in May 1946. After attending the Army Staff College, he was appointed training officer of No. 84 Group RAF based in Celle, Germany on 27 November 1946.

Carey returned to England in 1947 to divorce his first wife and marry army nurse Bertha Kathleen Walters Jones, known as Kate. They married on 18 December 1947 in Stockton-On-Tees. On 9 January 1948 he was posted back to Germany in given command of the Hawker Tempest 135 Wing at RAF Gütersloh. At this base Carey recorded his 2,000th flying hour. Carey also competed in air racing, organised by the RAF flying the de Havilland Vampire. In February 1949 Carey was appointed wing commander (administration) at RAF Thorney Island.

On 18 August 1949 he was appointed wing commander (organisation) at No. 12 Group RAF, Fighter Command before being wing commander (operations) in Scotland on 2 July 1951. Several more appointments followed; from October 1952 he was station commander at RAF Honiley in England and from April 1953 was promoted to group captain and assigned to Fighter Command headquarters from January 1956.

Carey became air adviser to the British High Commission in Australia from November 1957 to June 1960. He was made a Commander of the Order of the British Empire on 11 June 1960 on his retirement from the RAF and worked for Rolls-Royce Aero Division in Australia. On his retirement from Rolls-Royce he returned to England in September 1973, leaving his daughters (now married to Australian nationals) behind.

== Air victories ==
Carey was credited with 23 enemy aircraft shot down, six shared destroyed, four unconfirmed destroyed, seven probable, two destroyed on the ground and ten damaged. Of the 23 credited destroyed in air combat, 15 were German and 8 Japanese.

Aerial victories
Claim No.	Date	Time	Location	Enemy aircraft	Notes
	30 January 1940	12:30		Heinkel He 111 shared destroyed	Shared with Hull. A He 111H-1 of 4./KG 26. Feldwebel Helmut Höfer, Obergefreiter Albert Hain, Gefreiter Werner Korsinsky posted missing, observer Unteroffizier Richard Feist, killed in action.
	3 February 1940	11:20		He 111 shared destroyed	Shared with Ottewill. The He 111H-2, from 2./KG 26 was lost over the sea. Pilot Oberfeldwebel Fritz Wiemer was captured, rest of crew killed.
	28 March 1940	12:30		He 111 shared destroyed	Shared with Hull and Gough. He 111, of Korpsführungskette (Corps Leader Flight), X. Fliegerkorps (10th Flying Corps), crashed into the sea with all crew killed. Credit was shared between the two Squadrons, much to the chagrin of 43 Squadron.
1–3	10 May 1940	19:35, 19:40; 19:40 to 21:10	Lille; Merville	Two He 111 destroyed Four He 111 destroyed	Claimed over Lille. In the first battle Carey's victory was over an 8./KG 54 He 111 the pilot was the only member of his crew to survive. He baled out only to be attacked by French civilians but rescued by British Army soldiers. 8./KG 54 lost six bombers. Also lost were Staffelkapitän (Squadron Leader) Hauptmann Fritz Stadelmayr. Two were killed, one was captured by the British and two by the Belgians. Oberleutnant Volprecht Freiherr von Riedesel crash-landed with one killed and the other crew captured. Leutnant Alfred Jansen crash-landed near Ghent. Three were captured by the Belgians, the remaining by the British. Unteroffizier Alfred Vogel came down near Ghent with one killed and three captured by the Belgians. Unteroffizier Karl Reinhard and crew baled out and two were captured by the British. KG 27 lost two He 111s—6.KG 27 lost Unteroffizier Heinz Zimmermann and crew were killed. The bomber crashed near Oudenaarde. 9./KG 27 lost Feldwebel Heinz Schmelz crashed near Lille. 6, 7, 9 and 4 Staffel suffered one damaged bomber each.
4	11 May 1940	17:30	Lille	He 111 destroyed	Claimed over Douai. Stab./KG 54, Three crew captured and two crew killed.
5	12 May 1940		South of Brussels	He 111 destroyed He 111 probably destroyed	Claimed south of Brussels. Possibly misidentified. It may have been a Dornier Do 17 from 8./Kampfgeschwader 77 flown by Leutnant Konrad Hengsbach who crash-landed with four wounded. (Note: Brian Cull, Bruce Lander and Heinrich Weiss assert Carry claimed two Ju 87s and a He 111 this day. Norman Franks, Carey's biographer has used Carey's claim log which states he only claimed a He 111 destroyed and one more as a probably victory.)
6–10	13 May 1940	08:00; 08:10; 08:10; 08:10; 08:20; 09:10; 11:30	Louvain; Louvain; Louvain; Louvain unknown Louvain; SE of Brussels; Namur	Ju 87 destroyed Ju 87 destroyed Ju 87 probably destroyed Ju 87 probably destroyed He 111 destroyed One Do 17 destroyed One Hs 123 destroyed One He 111 shared destroyed	Claimed two Ju 87s from StG 2 near Louvain. Claimed a He 111 in the same combat. Claimed one Hs 123 of II.(S)./Lehrgeschwader 2 later in the morning south-east of Brussels.
11	14 May 1940	04:50	Wavre	Do 17 destroyed	Claimed near Wavre. Dornier Do 17 from of 3.(F)/11 (3 Staffel Aufklärer 11) crashed near the city and was destroyed. Pilot, observer and gunner were all wounded.
	9 July 1940	11:45	Isle of Wight	Bf 110 damaged	Claimed off Folkestone. 43 Squadron clashed with III./ZG 26. Two Bf 110C-2s were actually shot down and it appears Carey shared in both. At 12:05 Oberleutnant Siegmund was killed and his gunner was posted missing after crashing into the sea. Carey, and Pilot Officer Lott and Miller likely assisted in its destruction. Another Bf 110C-2 crashed into the sea and two NCO airmen were posted missing.
12	19 July 1940	17:15	Selsey Bill	Bf 109 destroyed Bf 109 damaged Bf 109 damaged	Claimed off Selsey Bill. One source records no loss for JG 27 this day and states only one Bf 109 (from III./Jagdgeschwader 51) was lost in action with No. 74 Squadron RAF. Leutnant Erbo Graf von Kageneck was wounded in the battle with 43 Squadron. No mention of his damaged Bf 109 was made in German records.
	8 August 1940	16:30	Isle of Wight	Bf 109 damaged	Engaged LG 1 and JG 27 near the Isle of Wight. 43 Squadron's Pilot Officer Hallows was credited with one Bf 109 and one damaged (pilot rescued) and Dalton-Morgan was credited with another whose pilot was wounded. I.JG 27 lost six Bf 109s this day to 43, 145 and 238 Squadrons. V./LG 1 lost one Bf 110 and another five damaged in combat with 238 and 609 Squadrons. 43 lost three Hurricanes; 145 lost three (and three in the morning battle) and 238 lost yet another three Hurricanes.
	12 August 1940	12:15	Channel	Ju 88 probably destroyed	Claimed near Portsmouth and the Channel. Carey's victory was probably over a Ju 88A-1 of II.KG 51, flown by Oberleutnant Noelker who was killed with his crew at 12:15.
13	13 August 1940	07:00	Uncertain; Littlehampton; Petworth; Petworth	One Ju 88 destroyed One Ju 88 probably destroyed Two Ju 88s damaged	Claimed near Littlehampton and Petworth at 07:00. Ju 88s from LG 1 and KG 54 were in action on 13 August. Most were lost or damaged in the air battles at 16:00. Only Do 17s from Kampfgeschwader 2 were in action at the time of Carey's claim. All KG 2 losses have been attributed to four other squadrons. However, one source indicates that Carey's claim was a Ju 88 of 4./LG 1 which was involved. The Ju 88 fell near Littlehampton. Oberleutnant Mller and Gefreiter Anders were killed, while the rest were made prisoner of war.
	15 August 1940	18:00	Unknown	Ju 88 shared destroyed	In the air battle eight Ju 88s from LG 1 were shot down. Five Ju 88s were credited to other squadrons. The crew of Oberleutnant Müller's Ju 88 was posted missing, the fate of the crew is unknown.
14–15	16 August 1940	~13:00	Selsey Bill	Two Ju 87s destroyed Two Ju 87s probably destroyed	Five Ju 87s from I./StG 2 were lost to 43 Squadron with three damaged. A further two Ju 87s were lost to 43 Squadron from III./StG 2. Ground-fire and 602 Squadron each accounted for another Ju 87.
16	18 August 1940	14:30	Thorney Island	Ju 87 destroyed	On this day 16 Ju 87s from I. and II./StG 77 were lost and six damaged. 43 Squadron were responsible for the destruction of four and three damaged. Seven were credited to 152 Squadron and five and two damaged to 602 Squadron.
	20 January 1941	Unknown	North Sea	Ju 88 damaged	
17	29 January 1942	Unknown	Mingaladon	Ki-27 destroyed Ki-27 damaged	Sōchō (sergeant major) Nagashima of the 77th Sentai, killed.
18	23 February 1942			Ki-51 destroyed	Captain Tadao Ohhira, of the 70th Independent Chutai, was killed.
19	24 February 1942	unknown	unknown	Ki-27 destroyed Unidentified transport destroyed	unknown
20–22	26 February 1942	unknown	unknown	Three Ki-27s destroyed	unknown
23	25 October 1942	unknown	unknown	Ki-43 destroyed	unknown

== Bibliography ==
- Arthur, Max – Forgotten Voices of The Second World War, 2004, Random House, ISBN 0091897343.
- Beedle, J. (1966). 43 Squadron, Royal Flying Corps – Royal Air Force: The History of the Fighting Cocks, 1916–66. London: Beaumont Aviation Literature.
- Bergström, Christer (2015). The Battle of Britain: An Epic Conflict Revisited. Oxford: Casemate. ISBN 978-1612-00347-4.
- Bingham, Victor. (1990). 'Blitzed': The Battle of France, May–June 1940, Air Publication. ISBN 978-1-8711-8707-6
- Cull, Brian; Lander, Bruce; Weiss, Heinrich. (1999). Twelve Days in May. London: Grub Street Publishing. ISBN 978-1902304120
- Chung, Ong Chit. (2011). Operation Matador World War II: Britain's Attempt to Foil the Japanese invasion of Malaya and Singapore. Marshall Cavendish Press. ISBN 978-9814-32847-0
- Bungay, Stephen. The Most Dangerous Enemy: A History of the Battle of Britain. London: Aurum Press. 2000. ISBN 978-1-85410-801-2
- Franks, Norman. (2006) (Republished 2008). Frank 'Chota' Carey: The Epic Story of G/C Carey CBE, DFC and 2 Bars, AFC, DFM, US Silver Star. London: Grub Street. ISBN 1-904943-38-1.
- Holmes, Tony. (1998). Hurricane Aces, 1939–40. Botley, Oxford, UK: Osprey Publishing Ltd. ISBN 978-1-85532-597-5.
- Hough, Richard and Denis Richards. (2007). The Battle of Britain. Pen & Sword. ISBN 978-1-84415-657-3
- Norman, Bill. (2002). Broken Eagles 2: Luftwaffe Losses Over Northumberland and Durham, 1939–1945. Barnsley: Pen & Sword. ISBN 0-85052-913-1
- Parker, Mathew. (2001). Battle of Britain, July – October 1940. Headline, London. ISBN 978-0-7472-3452-4
- Saunders, Andy. (2003). No 43 'Fighting Cocks' Squadron. Botley, Oxford, UK: Osprey Publishing Ltd. ISBN 1-84176-439-6
- Saunders, Andy (2010). Convoy Peewit: August 8, 1940: The First Day of the Battle of Britain? London, UK: Grub Street. ISBN 978-1-906502-67-6
- Shores, Christopher; Foreman, John; Ehrengardt, Chris. (1992). Fledgling Eagles: Complete Account of Air Operations During the "Phoney War" and Norwegian Campaign, 1940. ISBN 978-0-9488-1742-7
- Shores, Christopher F.; Cull, Brian; Izawa, Yasuho (2007). Bloody Shambles: The First Comprehensive Account of the Air Operations over South-East Asia December 1941 – April 1942. Volume One: Drift to War to the Fall of Singapore. London: Grub Street Press. ISBN 0-948817-50-X.
- Spick, Mike. (2004). Allied Fighter Aces. London, UK: Greenhill Books. ISBN 1-85367-587-3.
- Thomas, Andrew. (2003). Hurricane Aces, 1941–45. Botley, Oxford, UK: Osprey Publishing Ltd. ISBN 1-84176-610-0.
