= Erbo Graf von Kageneck =

German World War II flying ace

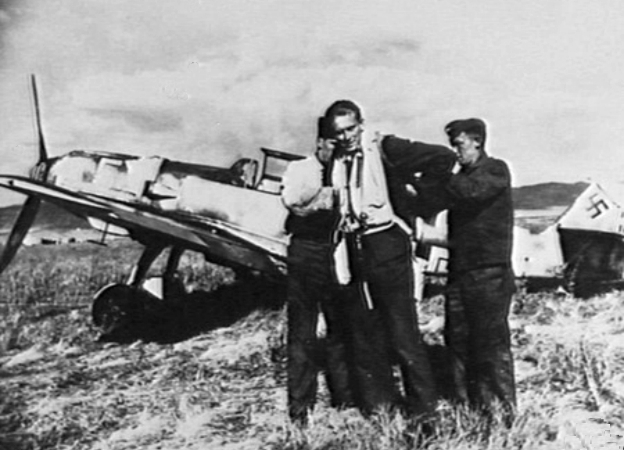
- Kageneck in front of his Messerschmitt Me 109E in Sicily in 1941, with ground crew
- Born: 2 April 1918; Bonn, German Empire
- Died: 12 January 1942 (aged 23); Naples, Italy
- Burial place: Cemetery Bleichheim
- Military career
- Allegiance: Nazi Germany
- Branch: Luftwaffe
- Service years: 1937–1942
- Rank: Hauptmann (captain)
- Units: JG 1, JG 27
- Commands: 9./JG 27
- Conflicts: See battles World War II: Battle of France Battle of Britain Malta Operation Barbarossa Mediterranean
- Awards: Knight's Cross of the Iron Cross with Oak Leaves

Erbo Graf von Kageneck (2 April 1918 – 12 January 1942) was a German Luftwaffe military aviator of aristocratic descent during World War II. As a fighter ace, he was credited with 67 enemy aircraft shot down claimed in 329 combat missions. The majority of his victories were claimed over the Eastern Front, with 19 claims in the Mediterranean theatre and over the Western Front. He was "ace-in-a-day" once, shooting down five aircraft on a single day.

Born in Bonn, Kageneck volunteered for military service in the Luftwaffe in 1937. Following flight training, he was posted to Jagdgeschwader 1 (JG 1—1st Fighter Wing). He fought in the Invasion of Poland and then in the Battle of France, claiming his first aerial victory on 12 May 1940. During the Battle of Britain, Kageneck was appointed Staffelkapitän (squadron leader) of 9. Staffel (9th squadron) of Jagdgeschwader 27 (JG 27—27th Fighter Wing) in September 1940. In 1941, his unit fought in Operation Barbarossa, the German invasion of the Soviet Union. Here, Kageneck was awarded the Knight's Cross of the Iron Cross on 31 July 1941 for 37 aerial victories claimed followed by the Knight's Cross of the Iron Cross with Oak Leaves on 16 October for 65 aerial victories claimed. His unit was then transferred to North Africa in late 1941. On 24 December, Kageneck was seriously wounded in combat and succumbed to his injuries on 12 January 1942 in a hopital at Naples, Italy.

== Early life and career ==
Kageneck was born on 2 April 1918 in Bonn, at the time in the Rhine Province of the German Empire. He was the fourth of six children of Generalmajor Karl von Kageneck and Baroness Maria von Schorlemer (1888-1959), daughter of Clemens Freiherr von Schorlemer-Lieser, an Imperial Secretary of Agriculture. His oldest brother was Clemens-Heinrich Graf von Kageneck (1913–2005), a captain in the army. Another brother, August von Kageneck (1922–2004), served as a lieutenant and a tank commander in the army, and was later a journalist and successful writer in French. His first name was Arbogast in homage to a distant 10th century Kageneck knight, which was quickly summed up to Erbo. Following four years of schooling at the Volksschule in Lieser, Kageneck attended the Aloisiuskolleg in Bad Godesberg, a school his brothers also attended. In 1935, Kageneck joined the Hitler Youth. In early 1936, he transferred to the Friedrich-Wilhelm-Gymnasium in Trier where he graduated with his Abitur (diploma) in 1937.

Following his graduation, Kageneck volunteered for military service in the Luftwaffe in 1937. Following completion of flight and fighter pilot training, (Note: Flight training in the Luftwaffe progressed through the levels A1, A2 and B1, B2, referred to as A/B flight training. A training included theoretical and practical training in aerobatics, navigation, long-distance flights and dead-stick landings. The B courses included high-altitude flights, instrument flights, night landings and training to handle the aircraft in difficult situations.) he was posted to 2. Staffel (2nd squadron) of Jagdgeschwader 1 (JG 1—1st Fighter Wing), a squadron of I. Gruppe (1st group) of JG 1 commanded by Major Bernhard Woldenga.

== World War II ==
World War II in Europe began on Friday, 1 September 1939, when German forces invaded Poland. In preparation for the invasion I. Gruppe of JG 1 had moved to airfields at Schippenbeil, present-day Sępopol, Heiligenbeil, present-day Mamonovo, and Arys-Rostken, present-day Orzysz, in East Prussia. Here, the Gruppe was subordinated to Luftflotte 1 (Air Fleet 1) under command of General der Flieger Albert Kesselring. On 6 September, the Gruppe was withdrawn from Poland and ordered to Lübeck-Blankensee and then on 15 September to an airfield at Vörden, located approximately 20 kilometers (12 miles) north of Osnabrück, where the unit stayed until January 1940. There, the Gruppe flew fighter protection during the "Phoney War" on the German border to the Netherlands.

In mid-January 1940, I. Gruppe was ordered to an airfield at Gymnich, today part of Erftstadt, where it patrolled Germany's western border. There, the Gruppe continuously conducted various flight exercises. In late April, the unit received the first Messerschmitt Bf 109 E-4 variant, replacing the Bf 109 E-3s. On 13 February, command of I. Gruppe was transferred from Woldenga to Hauptmann Joachim Schlichting.

=== Battle of France and Britain ===
The Wehrmacht launched the invasion of France and the Low Countries (Fall Gelb) on 10 May 1940. During this campaign, I. Gruppe of JG 1 was subordinated to the Geschwaderstab (headquarters unit) of Jagdgeschwader 27 (JG 27–27th Fighter Wing) which was under the control of VIII. Fliegerkorps (8th Air Corps) under the command of Generaloberst Wolfram Freiherr von Richthofen. Two days later, Kageneck claimed his first two aerial victories while providing fighter protection for the German ground forces crossing the Meuse, as well as the bridges crossing the Albert Canal at Veldwezelt, Vroenhoven and Kanne. That day, I. Gruppe claimed ten Bristol Blenheim bombers shot down, including two by Kageneck near Maastricht. This earned him the Iron Cross 2nd Class (Eisernes Kreuz zweiter Klasse) on 14 May. Following the advancing German ground forces, the Gruppe moved to an airfield at Charleville-Mézières on 16 May, and then to Tupigny on 31 May. The second and decisive phase, Fall Rot (Case Red), of the Battle of France began on 5 June. I. Gruppe supported the German forces fighting at the Somme and Aisne. That day, I. Gruppe pilots claimed eleven aerial victories including a Morane-Saulnier M.S.406 fighter near Roye. On 6 June, Kageneck claimed a French Lioré et Olivier LeO 451 bomber in the vicinity of Noyon, his fourth and last during the French campaign.

JG 27 insignia

In preparation for combat with the Royal Air Force (RAF) in what would become the Battle of Britain, I. Gruppe moved to an airfield at Plumetot, locate north of Caen on the English Channel, on 30 June. On 5 July 1940, the Jagdwaffe (fighter force) of the Luftwaffe was reorganized and in consequence the I. Gruppe of JG 1 became the III. Gruppe of JG 27, subsequently his 2. Staffel of JG 1 became the 8. Staffel of JG 27. On 11 July, Kageneck was awarded the Iron Cross 1st Class (Eisernes Kreuz erster Klasse). (Note: According to Schumann on 11 June 1940.) A week later, on 19 July, Kageneck was wounded in aerial combat east of the Isle of Wight while flying a Bf 109 E-4. It is possible, that his opponent may have been Pilot Officer Frank Reginald Carey who claimed to have scored hits on two and to have shot down one Bf 109 that day. In this encounter, Kageneck had claimed two RAF Hawker Hurricane fighters shot down south of the Isle of Wight. Following his recovery, he claimed his next aerial victory on 18 August over a Supermarine Spitfire fighter near Bognor Regis. On 9 September during a mission supporting Operation "Loge", Kageneck claimed a Spitfire shot near Rochford.

On 18 September 1940, Kageneck was appointed Staffelkapitän (squadron leader) of 9. Staffel of JG 27, replacing Oberleutnant Max Dobislav who was transferred. He claimed his first aerial victory as Staffelkapitän on 20 October, a Hurricane shot down southeast of London. He was promoted to Oberleutnant (first lieutenant) on 1 October 1940. On 10 November, III. Gruppe was withdrawn from Channel operations. The Gruppe was first ordered to Diepholz Airfield and then to Vechta for a period of replenishment and equipment overhaul.

=== Balkan and Malta ===
In January 1941, JG 27 was ordered to relocate to Romania. Between 12 and 14 January, the ground personnel of III. Gruppe arrived in Bucharest-Băneasa, preparing for the arrival of the air elements which relocated on 2 February. Shortly after, the Gruppe moved to Giulești.

Following the Balkans campaign, III. Gruppe was briefly deployed to Sicily for actions against Malta. On 2 May, the Gruppe transferred to Gela and flew its first combat mission to Malta on 6 May, escorting Heinkel He 111 bombers from Kampfgeschwader 26 (KG 26—26th Bomber Wing). That day, Kageneck claimed a Hurricane shot down near Luqa. According to Shores, it is likely that his opponent was Pilot Officer Alan Sydney Dredge from No. 261 Squadron who made a forced landing in his Hurricane Z3057 and sustained severe burns. On 20 May, Kageneck claimed III. Gruppe's last aerial victory over Malta when he shot down Pilot Officer Anthony John Reeves from No. 261 Squadron flying Hurricane N2673. On 24 May, III. Gruppe left Sicily and returned to Germany.

=== Operation Barbarossa ===
In June, the Wehrmacht was preparing for Operation Barbarossa, the German invasion of the Soviet, and consolidating its forces near the border established in the German–Soviet Frontier Treaty. On 4 June, III. Gruppe arrived at Suwałki before being redeployed to Sobolewo on 12 June. At the start of the invasion, JG 27, with the exception of I. Gruppe, was subordinated to VIII. Fliegerkorps and was deployed in the northern sector of Army Group Centre. On 22 June 1941, the opening day of Operation Barbarossa, III. Gruppe flew many ground support missions against Soviet airfields and forces, its first just past 03:00. Later in the day, Kageneck shot down a Tupolev SB bomber south of Vilnius.

Following his 37th aerial victory, he was awarded the Knight's Cross of the Iron Cross (Ritterkreuz des Eisernen Kreuzes) on 30 July 1941. The following day, III. Gruppe moved to an airfield at Soltsy, located west of Lake Ilmen. From this airfield, the Gruppe fought over the combat areas near Staraya Russa, south of Lake Ilmen, and Veliky Novgorod which is north of Lake Ilmen. On 10 August, Kageneck claimed a SB-3 bomber shot down. He became an "ace-in-a-day" on 14 August, claiming his 39th to 43rd aerial victory. On 20 August, Kageneck made a forced landing in his Bf 109 E-4 (Werknummer 1326—factory number) near Chudovo. Kageneck had logged his 300th combat mission in this aircraft.

On 16 October, General der Flieger Wolfram Freiherr von Richthofen discharged III. Gruppe at Stabna, located just north of Smolensk, from operations on the Eastern Front. By this date, Kageneck had claimed 48 Soviet victories and — with his total now at 65 — was awarded the Knight's Cross of the Iron Cross with Oak Leaves (Ritterkreuz des Eisernen Kreuzes mit Eichenlaub) on 26 October 1941. He was the first pilot of JG 27 and 39th member of the German armed forces to be so honored.

=== North Africa and death ===
Following the withdrawal from the Eastern Front, III. Gruppe had been moved to Döberitz on 26 October. There, the Gruppe was equipped with the Bf 109 F-4 trop and began training for deployment to the Mediterranean theatre. On 5 November, Kageneck, together with Hauptmann Gordon Gollob, received the Oak Leaves from Adolf Hitler personally at the Wolf's Lair, Hitler's headquarters in Rastenburg, present-day Kętrzyn in Poland. When Oberst Werner Mölders was killed in a flying accident on 22 November, he was given a state funeral in Berlin on 28 November. His coffin was laid out in the honor court of the Reichsluftfahrtministerium (Ministry of Aviation). The guard of honor consisted of Johann Schalk, Günther Lützow, Walter Oesau, Joachim Müncheberg, Adolf Galland, Wolfgang Falck, Herbert Kaminski and Karl-Gottfried Nordmann, with Kageneck holding Mölders' military decorations pillow. On 6 December, III. Gruppe transferred to North Africa where they were based at Timimi, Libya.

Kageneck claimed his last two aerial victories against British Commonwealth fighters on 12 December. That day, he claimed a Hurricane and Curtiss P-40 Warhawk fighter shot down near Timimi. On 24 December, Kageneck was seriously wounded in combat with several Desert Air Force (DAF) P-40 and Hurricane fighters south of Agedabia. Both Sergeant Maxwell of No. 94 Squadron and Pilot Officer Thompson No. 229 Squadron made claims for a fighter shot down in the same action. Many years later, some sources, including Kageneck's brother, August von Kageneck, claimed that the shots which hit Erbo were fired by the pre-eminent Australian ace of the war, Clive Caldwell.

Kageneck sustained severe injuries in combat near Agedabia resulting in a forced landing of his Bf 109 F-4 trop (Werknummer 8554) in the desert near El Magrun where he was recovered by Italian soldiers. He was immediately evacuated, first to a hospital in Athens, and then to another in Naples where, despite intensive care, he died of his wounds to his stomach and abdomen on 12 January 1942. He was posthumously promoted to Hauptmann (captain). Command of 9. Staffel was temporarily passed on to Leutnant Klaus Faber before Hauptmann Hans-Joachim Heinecke took command on 2 May 1942. Initially, Kageneck was buried in Naples before his family had him reinterred with military honors at the cemetery in Bleichheim, present-day part of Herbolzheim.

== Summary of career ==
=== Aerial victory claims ===
According to US historian David T. Zabecki, Kageneck was credited with 67 aerial victories. Spick also lists him with 67 aerial victories, claimed in an unknown number of combat missions, 19 on the Western Front - including four over Malta and two in North Africa - and 48 on the Eastern Front. The authors Ring and Girbig list him 67 aerial victories, 19 on the Western Front and 48 on the Eastern Front, as well. Thomas states that Kageneck flew 329 combat missions. Mathews and Foreman, authors of Luftwaffe Aces — Biographies and Victory Claims, researched the German Federal Archives and found records for 66 aerial victory claims. This number includes 19 claims over the Western Allies and 47 on the Eastern Front.

Chronicle of aerial victories
This and the ♠ (Ace of spades) indicates those aerial victories which made Kageneck an "ace-in-a-day", a term which designates a fighter pilot who has shot down five or more airplanes in a single day. This and the ? (question mark) indicates information discrepancies listed by Prien, Stemmer, Rodeike, Bock, Mathews and Foreman.
– 2. Staffel of Jagdgeschwader 1 – Battle of France — 10 May – 25 June 1940
1	12 May 1940	06:00	Blenheim	vicinity of Maastricht	3	5 June 1940	—	M.S.406	Roye
2	12 May 1940	06:02	Blenheim	vicinity of Maastricht	4	6 June 1940	—	LeO 451	Noyon
– 8. Staffel of Jagdgeschwader 27 – At the Channel and over England — 26 June – 17 September 1940
5	19 July 1940	18:35	Hurricane	off the Isle of Wight	7	18 August 1940	15:30	Spitfire	Bognor Regis
6	19 July 1940	18:40	Hurricane	off the Isle of Wight	8	9 September 1940	19:40	Spitfire	Rochford
– 9. Staffel of Jagdgeschwader 27 – At the Channel and over England — 18 September – 10 November 1940
9	20 September 1940	11:46	Hurricane	southeast of London	12	15 October 1940	11:07	Spitfire	south of Maidstone
10	29 September 1940	10:41	Hurricane	Tunbridge Wells	13	27 October 1940	09:48	Spitfire	Ashford
11	13 October 1940	15:20	Hurricane	Faversham					
– 9. Staffel of Jagdgeschwader 1 – Over Malta — 2 – 24 May 1941
14	6 May 1941	12:08	Hurricane	Luqa, Malta	16	14 May 1941	16:36	Hurricane	Luqa, Malta
15	13 May 1941	13:52	Hurricane	Luqa, Malta	17	20 May 1941	17:40	Hurricane	southwest of Ta' Vnezja, Malta
– 9. Staffel of Jagdgeschwader 1 – Operation Barbarossa — 22 June – 16 October 1941
18	22 June 1941	18:50	SB-2	south of Vilnius	42♠	14 August 1941	14:42	DB-3	east of Winy
19	27 June 1941	17:26	SB-2	south of Minsk	43♠	14 August 1941	14:45	DB-3	east-southeast of Winy
20	27 June 1941	17:28	SB-2	south of Minsk	44	15 August 1941	10:27	Il-2	east-southeast of Proletariy
21	27 June 1941	17:32	SB-2	south of Minsk	45	16 August 1941	10:36	I-18 (MiG-1)	east of Novgorod
22	8 July 1941	06:08	SB-2	west of Vitebsk	46	19 August 1941	11:34	I-18 (MiG-1)	east of Chudovo
23	11 July 1941	13:25	U-2	northeast of Gloyniki	47	19 August 1941	15:45	I-18 (MiG-1)	southeast of Kreszty
24	12 July 1941	18:48	DB-3	west of Vitebsk	48	21 August 1941	17:58	Il-2	north of Staraya Russa
25	13 July 1941	12:00	DI-6	southwest of Smolensk	49	27 August 1941	12:10	I-18 (MiG-1)	east of Manushkino
26	14 July 1941	14:23	I-16	north of Smolensk	50	29 August 1941	12:23	I-18 (MiG-1)	south of Mga
27	18 July 1941	13:29	DB-3	east of Demidov	51	29 August 1941	16:12	Il-2	northwest of Schapki
28	19 July 1941	18:20	DB-3	west of Yartsevo	52	29 August 1941	16:26	Il-2	northwest of Tosno
29	20 July 1941	07:15	DB-3	southeast of Yartsevo	53	2 September 1941	07:53	I-16	east of Ivanovskoy
30? (Note: This claim is not listed by Mathews and Foreman.)	20 July 1941	—	DB-3	southeast of Yartsevo	54	3 September 1941	05:28	I-18 (MiG-1)	southwest of Wassiklowo
31	22 July 1941	19:26	DB-3	east of Yartsevo	55	3 September 1941	09:57	I-16	southeast of Slutsk
32	26 July 1941	04:17	R-10 (Seversky)	northeast of Yartsevo	56	2 October 1941	14:06	I-18 (MiG-1)	Pogorjelo
33	26 July 1941	19:23	I-16	east of Yartsevo	57	3 October 1941	12:08	I-18 (MiG-1)	north of Vyazma
34	26 July 1941	19:25	I-16	east of Yartsevo	58	4 October 1941	13:55	DB-3	Michjejewa
35	27 July 1941	04:05	DB-3	north of Lake Shiziskoje	59	4 October 1941	14:08	SB-2	Spass
36	27 July 1941	08:20	DB-3	west of Demidov	60	4 October 1941	16:52	Pe-2	south of Chełm
37	27 July 1941	08:22	DB-3	west of Demidov	61	7 October 1941	09:10	Pe-2	east of Chełm
38	10 August 1941	19:51	SB-3	north of Golino	62	11 October 1941	16:14	Il-2	north of Sychyovka
39♠	14 August 1941	09:57? (Note: According to Mathews and Foreman claimed at 09:47.)	I-16	north-northeast of Novgorod	63	11 October 1941	16:16	Il-2	northwest of Sychyovka
40♠	14 August 1941	14:33	DB-3	Malyje Lutschno	64	11 October 1941	16:23	Il-2	northwest of Sychyovka
41♠	14 August 1941	14:35	DB-3	southeast of Malyje Lutschno	65	12 October 1941	08:23	I-18 (MiG-1)	east of Zubtsov
– 9. Staffel of Jagdgeschwader 27 – In North Africa — 6 – 24 December 1941
66	12 December 1941	13:46	P-40	vicinity of Timimi	67	12 December 1941	—	Hurricane	vicinity of Timimi

=== Awards ===
- Iron Cross (1939)
  - 2nd Class (14 May 1940)
  - 1st Class (11 July 1940)
- Wound Badge (1939) in Black (July 1940)
- Knight's Cross of the Iron Cross with Oak Leaves
  - Knight's Cross on 30 July 1941 as Oberleutnant and Staffelkapitän of the 9./Jagdgeschwader 27
  - 39th Oak Leaves on 26 October 1941 as Oberleutnant and Staffelkapitän of the 9./Jagdgeschwader 27

=== Dates of rank ===
8 November 1939:	Leutnant (Second Lieutenant)
1 October 1940:	Oberleutnant (First Lieutenant)
posthumously:	Hauptmann (Captain)
