= No. 177 Squadron RAF =

Defunct flying squadron of the Royal Air Force

- Active: 11 Jan 1943 – 1 Jul 1945
- Country: United Kingdom
- Branch: Royal Air Force
- Motto(s): Latin: Silentur in medias res (Silently into the midst of things)

Insignia
- Squadron Badge: Two cannon and a viper

No. 177 Squadron RAF was a Royal Air Force Squadron that was a light bomber unit based in India in World War II.

== History ==
=== Formation in World War II ===
The squadron was formed at RAF Amarda Road, India on 14 January 1943, although initially it had no aircraft. It moved to Allahabad in mid-March, with some of its pilots being loaned to 27 Squadron. The squadron moved to Phaphamau in May where it received Beaufighter VIs and began training in long-range strike operations. The squadron moved to Feni on 21 August 1943, and flew its first operation, an attack by two Beaufighters against Japanese communications on the coast of Burma, on 10 September. The squadron converted to rocket armament for operations in Burma and disbanded on 1 July 1945.

== Aircraft operated ==
Aircraft operated by no. 177 Squadron RAF
From	To	Aircraft	Variant
May 1943	May 1944	Bristol Beaufighter	VIC
Nov 1943	Jul 1945	Bristol Beaufighter	X
