= Amarda Road Airstrip =

Defunct Airports in Odisha, India

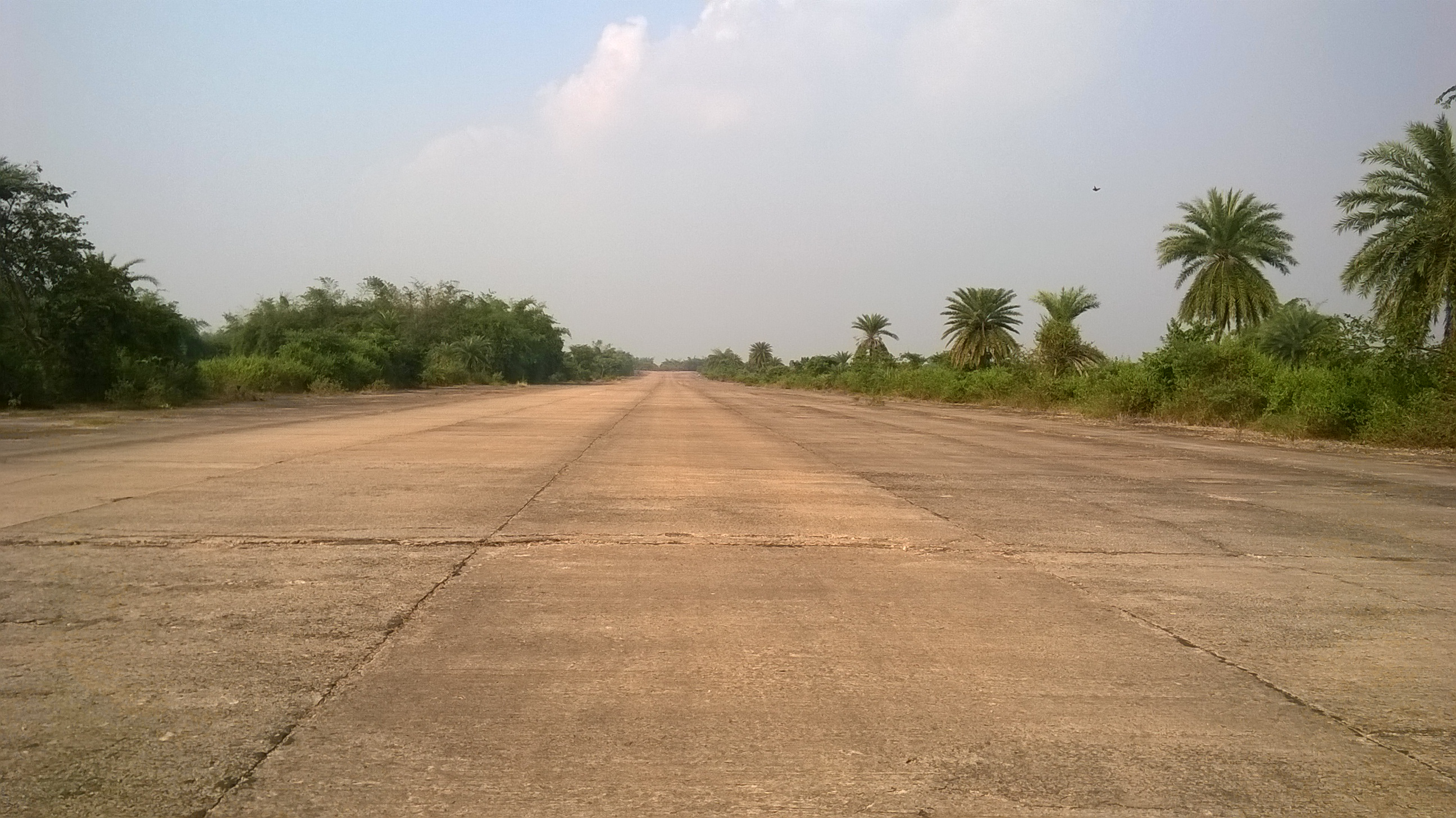
- IATA: none; ICAO: none

Summary
- Airport type: Defunct
- Owner: Ministry of Defence
- Operator: Indian Air Force
- Location: Rasgovindpur, Odisha, India
- Built: 1940
- Elevation AMSL: 130 ft (40 m)
- Coordinates: 21°48′18″N 087°02′49″E

Map
- Location in Odisha Amarda Road Airstrip (India)

Runways
Direction	Length		Surface
Direction	ft	m	Surface
05/23	6,000	1,830	Concrete
17/35	6,670	2,032	Concrete

Amarda Road Airstrip, also known as Rasgovindpur Airstrip, is a former wartime airfield located near Rasgovindpur village in Mayurbhanj district of Odisha, India. It was used by the Royal Indian Air Force during World War II.

== History ==
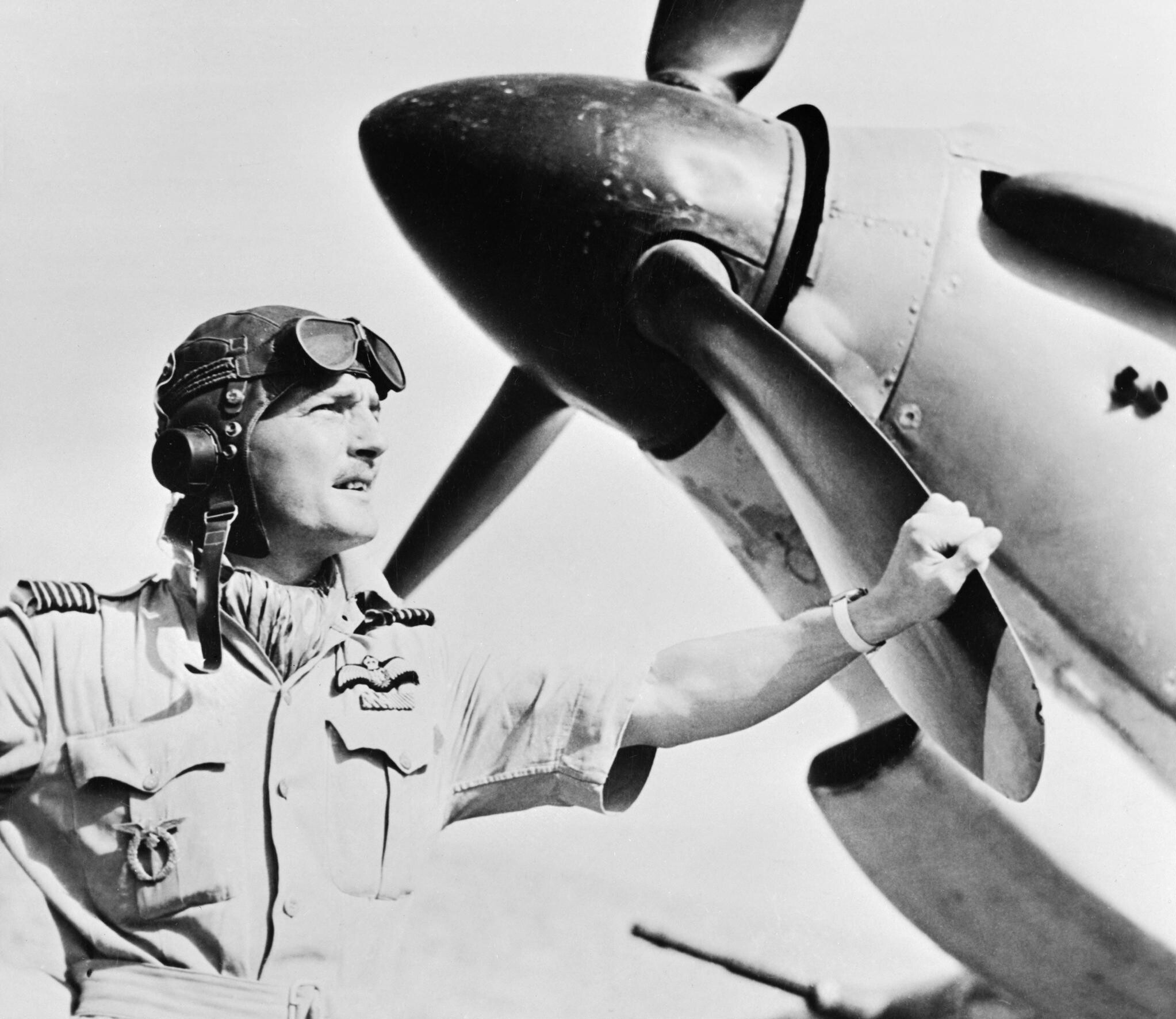
Wing Commander Frank Carey, Officer Commanding the Air Firing Training Unit, based at Amarda Road, India, standing by the nose of a Hawker Hurricane, in April 1943.

The Amarda Road airstrip, as it was called in war terminology, spreads across an area of nearly 900 acres. Built in the 1940s at a cost of Rs 3 crore, it was eventually abandoned after the war. It was probably named as Amarda Road Airfield because of the nearby Amarda Road railway station. The airfield was used by No. 136 Squadron RAF, No. 177 Squadron RAF and No. 607 Squadron RAF. The 'Air Fighting Training Unit', formed in February 1943, was also based here.

As an airfield, Amarda Road fell on the supply route for the Nationalist Armies of China in their fight against the Japanese. Aircraft of the RAF and the United States Army Air Forces (USAAF) would regularly fly from this space to China via Chabua (Dibrugarh), Jorhat and Vijaynagar across the infamous hump route over Arunachal and East Tibet.

Amarda Road and other neighbouring airfields - Dhalbhumgarh, Dudhkundi, Salua, Digri, Salbani and Chakulia - formed a web of airfields created by the Allies to stop the impending Japanese advance in the east. During the war, Amarda Road was, to put it simply, a battle hub. After the war was over, most airfields, including this one, fell into disuse. Today, only the Kalaikunda airstrip, which was declared an Air Force Station in 1954, exists.

== Present condition ==
Eight decades after the base was built, the 11,000 feet (3,400 m) concrete runway is still intact, though the buildings that once cluttered the edges are gone.

There are proposals to renovate the airstrip for future operations under UDAN scheme from 2022. As of November 2022, the Government of India and the Ministry of Defence have cleared for the airstrip to be developed as a commercial airport by acquiring a land area of 160 acres, and developing it at a cost of ₹ 25 crores.

== Gallery ==
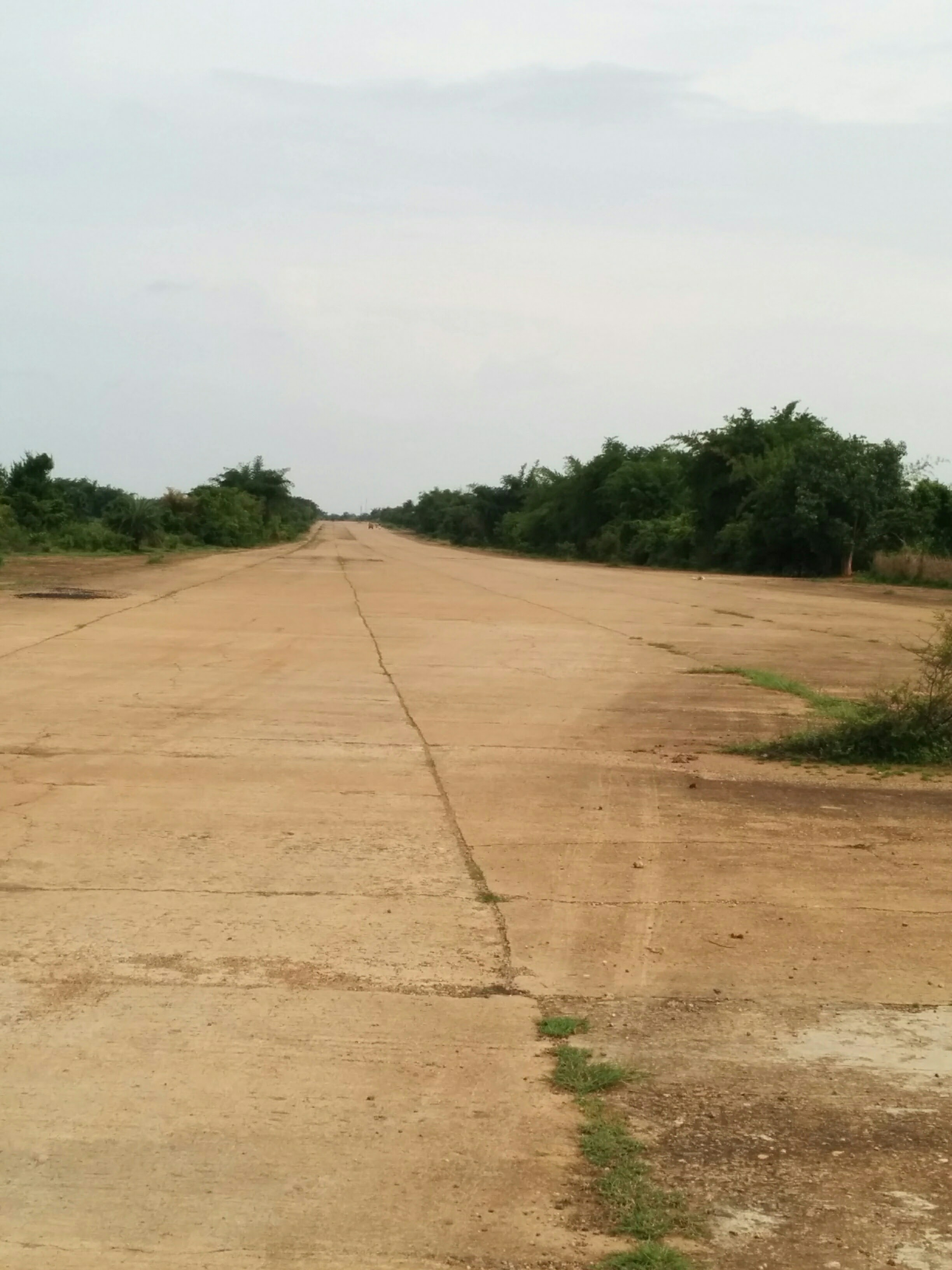
Airstrip

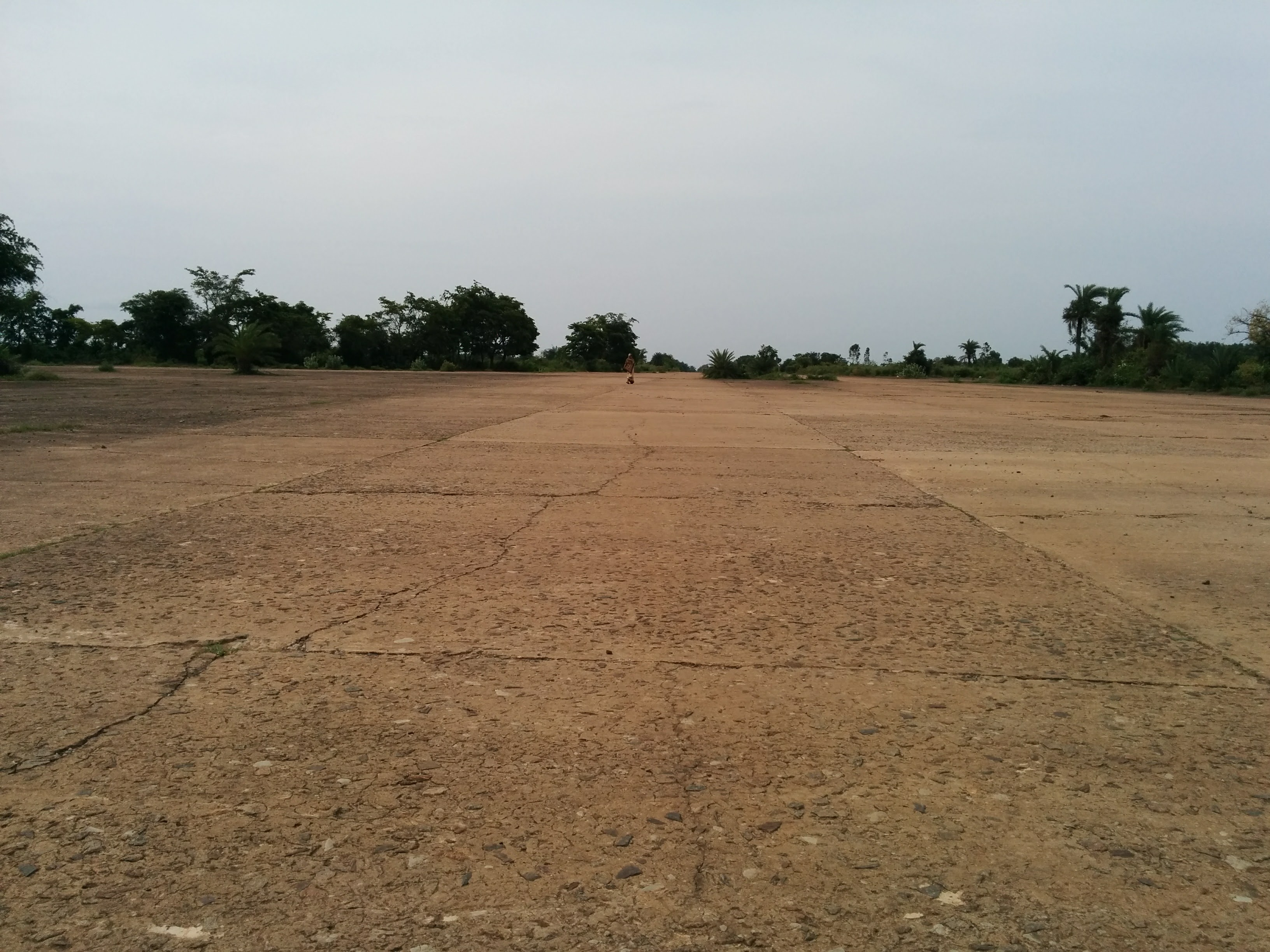
Airstrip

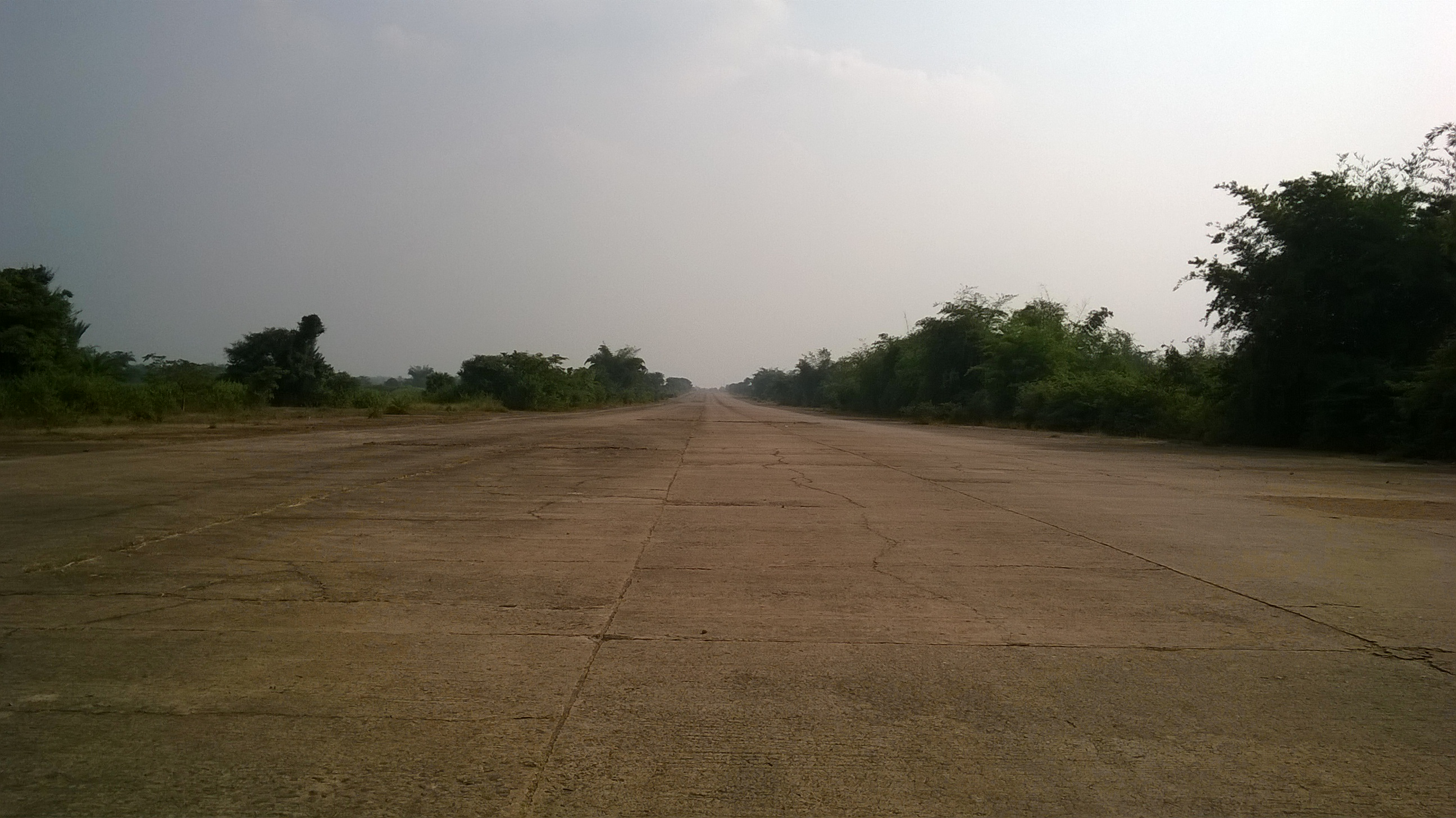
Concrete runway
