= Spass =

Spass Спасс
- Village
- Location within Vologda Oblast Location within Russia
- Coordinates: 59°07′N 40°12′E
- Country: Russia
- Region: Vologda Oblast
- District: Vologodsky District
- Time zone: UTC+3:00

Spass (Russian: Спасс) is a rural locality (a village) in Markovskoye Rural Settlement, Vologodsky District, Vologda Oblast, Russia. The population was 23 as of 2002. There are 2 streets.

== Geography ==
Spass is located 30 km southeast of Vologda (the district's administrative centre) by road. Ivanovka is the nearest rural locality.
