= Tavistock and Summerhill School =

Former independent nursery to preparatory school in West Sussex

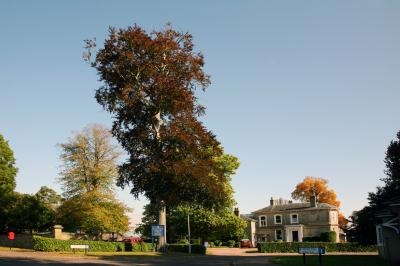

Location
- Summerhill Grange; Haywards Heath, West Sussex, RH16 1RP; England; 51.01096°N 0.09414°W

Information
- Type: Independent school
- Established: 1973
- Closed: 2015
- Local authority: West Sussex
- Department for Education URN: 126144 Tables
- Ofsted: Reports
- Gender: Mixed
- Age: 2 to 13
- Houses: Belverdere; Court; Field; Gregory
- Website: http://www.tavistockandsummerhill.co.uk

Tavistock and Summerhill School, located in Lindfield just 4 minutes from the heart of Haywards Heath, West Sussex was an independent day mixed nursery to preparatory school established in 1973 following the merger of Tavistock Hall and Summerhill Court. It closed down on 26 October 2015.

The headteacher before closure was Dr Sandra Hastie. The religious affiliation was non-denominational. Admission to the school was through informal assessment.

== Nursery ==
The school's nursery was situated in the walled garden. Children in the nursery were offered a flexible timetable. Some pupils attended every day for the whole day, whereas some only attended certain mornings.

== Pre-prep department (PPD) ==
The pre-prep department (referred to as the PPD) had small classes and took children through reception class and through years 1 and 2.

== The prep school ==
The prep school started in Year 3 when the specialist teaching in core subjects began. Pupils began work for their SATS in Year 6. After the SATS in Year 6, the pupils then had to prepare for Common Entrance exams at the end of Year 8. Traditionally 50% of the pupils tried for scholarships to other private schools at the end of Year 8.

== The school and its facilities ==
=== Sports ===
Tavistock and Summerhill offered many sports including: football, rugby, netball, hockey, rounders, cricket, gymnastics, athletics, tennis, and swimming in a pool on-site. All pupils had the opportunity to represent the school against a wide variety of local schools. During term time there were several house competitions and in the summer term there was a sports day and a house swimming gala. The school had number of pupils who have represented their sport at an elite level, including winners of national athletic medals.

=== Music and the performing arts ===
Tavistock and Summerhill offered specialist music teaching to all pupils from nursery to year 8. All pupils learned to play the recorder during lessons from year 2 to year 5 and many pupils had individual instrumental lessons. They had a choir which performed regularly to both local audiences as well as concerts at school and annually at The O2 Arena (London). There was an informal concert held every year, a Christmas carol service held at a nearby church and a summer concert held in the walled garden.

Every year the school put on dramatic productions and musicals with different year groups taking part in different productions.

=== Extra curricular activities ===
The school offered a variety of clubs held both during lunchtimes and after school. Textiles, touch typing, sports clubs including karate, fencing and tennis.

== Houses and award ceremonies ==
Pupils in years 3-8 were put into houses. These houses had competitions every term throughout the year, including cricket, football, swimming and a sports day. The four houses were:

- Belverdere (light blue tie)
- Court (red tie)
- Field (dark green tie)
- Gregory (gold tie)

At the end of each term there was a prize giving ceremony where prizes (shields, cups and certificates) were handed out to both pupils and houses. The main ceremony was the Summer Prize Giving Ceremony which was held at nearby Clair Hall. In 2010 Chris Bradford, the author of the Young Samurai series presented the awards.
