= Shangani, Zimbabwe =

Coordinates: 19.777°S 29.366°E

Shangani is a small farming settlement in Zimbabwe, near the Shangani River on the road between Gweru and Bulawayo.
