= 96th Airlift Squadron =

96th Airlift Squadron

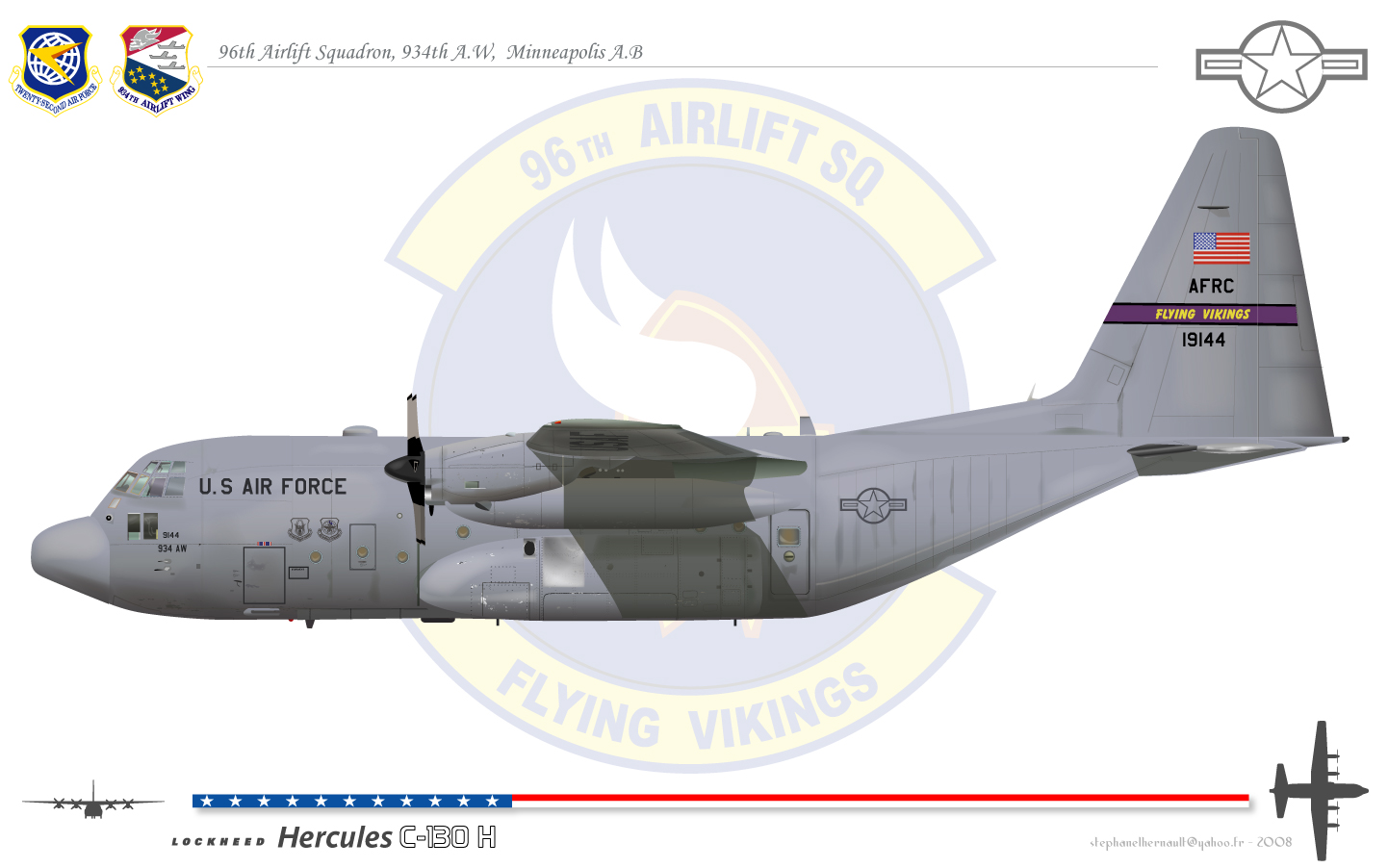
- Profile of a squadron C-130H Hercules
- Active: 1943–1945; 1947–1951; 1952–present
- Country: United States
- Branch: United States Air Force
- Role: Airlift
- Part of: Air Force Reserve Command
- Garrison/HQ: Minneapolis-St Paul Joint Air Reserve Station
- Nickname: Flying Vikings
- Engagements: Operation Overlord; Operation Dragoon; Operation Market Garden; Battle of Bastogne
- Decorations: Distinguished Unit Citation; Air Force Outstanding Unit Award; Republic of Vietnam Gallantry Cross with Palm

Commanders
- Current commander: Lt Col Phil Noland

Insignia
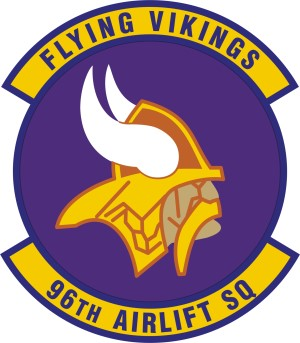
- 96th Airlift Squadron emblem (Note: Approved 18 June 1997.)

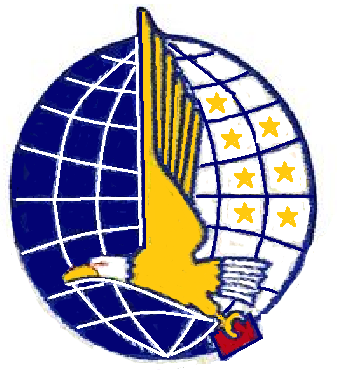
- 96th Troop Carrier Squadron emblem (Note: Approved 28 July 1960.)

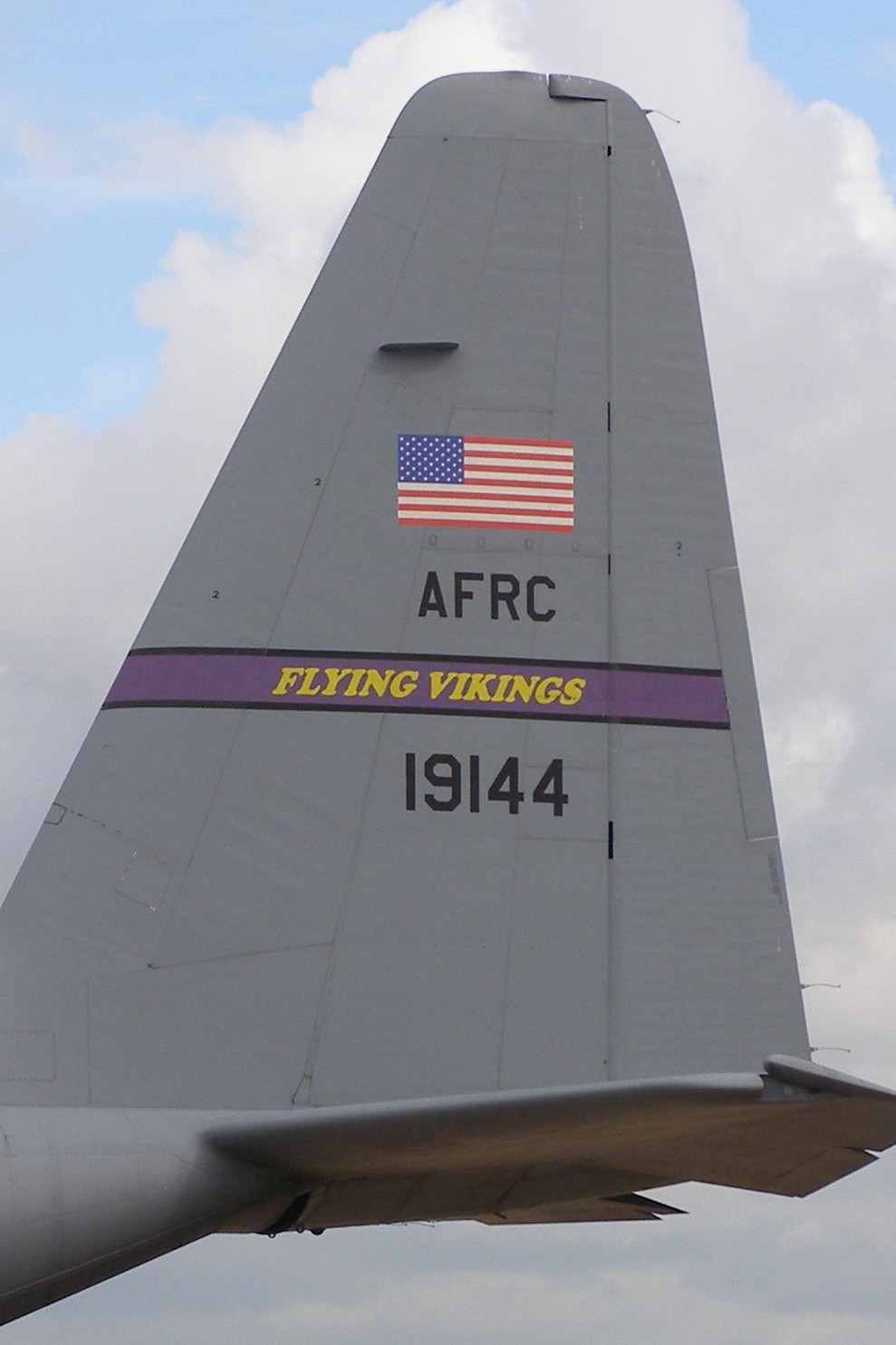
C-130H showing the squadrons Flying Vikings banner

The 96th Airlift Squadron is part of the 934th Airlift Wing at Minneapolis-St Paul Joint Air Reserve Station, Minnesota. It operates Lockheed C-130 Hercules aircraft supporting the United States Air Force global reach mission worldwide. The unit has supported the conflicts of World War II, Korea, Vietnam, and the Gulf War and has helped prove the concept of a reliable and ready airlift reserve fleet of the United States Air Force.

== Mission ==
Fly Lockheed C-130H Hercules cargo aircraft, both airdropping and air landing cargo and people.

== History ==
=== World War II ===
The squadron was activated in July 1943 as an I Troop Carrier Command Douglas C-47 Skytrain Squadron. After training in the United States, at various bases, it was sent to Baer Field, Indiana for final equipping with aircraft, personnel, and other equipment. It was then deployed to IX Troop Carrier Command in February 1944 during the build-up prior to the invasion of France.

During the D-Day Invasion, the squadron dropped paratroops of the 101st Airborne Division in Normandy, subsequently flying numerous missions to bring in reinforcements and needed supplies. During the airborne attack on The Netherlands (Operation Market Garden, September 1944), the squadron dropped paratroops, towed gliders, and flew resupply missions. Later participated in the invasion of southern France in August 1944. The squadron supported the 101st Airborne Division in the Battle of the Bulge by towing gliders full of supplies near Bastogne on 27 December 1944. In addition, its units participated in the air assault across the Rhine River in early 1945 (Operation Varsity) and later flew numerous freight missions to carry gasoline, food, medicine, and other supplies to allied ground forces during the Western Allied invasion of Germany in April 1945 near Wesel. The squadron also hauled food, clothing, medicine, gasoline, ordnance equipment, and other supplies to the front lines and evacuated patients to rear zone hospitals. It transported displaced persons from Germany to France and Belgium after V-E Day. Remained in Europe during the summer of 1945, inactivating as part of the United States Air Forces in Europe, October 1945.

=== Reserve operations and mobilization for the Korean War ===
Reactivated in the reserve as a Curtiss C-46 Commando troop carrier squadron in Minneapolis, Minnesota during 1947. Was federalized as a result of the Korean War in 1951, squadron personnel and aircraft being sent to active-duty units as fillers, inactivated as an administrative unit a few days later.

=== Reactivation in the reserve ===
Reactivated after the Korean War as a reserve fighter-bomber squadron in 1952 initially equipped with North American F-51 Mustangs, later upgraded to Lockheed F-80 Shooting Star jet aircraft. Redesignated back to a troop carrier squadron in 1957. Carried out theater transport operations and supported Air Force and Army units with troop carrier missions. Was activated during the 1962 Cuban Missile Crisis, carried Army units to South Florida in preparation of a possible invasion of Cuba. Returned Army personnel to home stations after the situation was normalized and returned to reserve service.

The squadron flew airlift missions worldwide, including to Southeast Asia during the Vietnam War and to Southwest Asia during the Gulf War. It has also participated in training exercises, some involving the dropping or landing of airborne troops, and flew numerous humanitarian airlift missions.

=== Campaigns and decorations ===
- Campaigns: World War II: Normandy; Northern France; Rome-Arno; Southern France; Rhineland; Ardennes-Alsace; Central Europe.
- Decorations: Distinguished Unit Citation: France, [6–7] Jun 1944. Air Force Outstanding Unit Awards: 1 Oct 1988 – 30 Sep 1990; 1 Jul 1994 – 30 Jun 1996; 30 Sep 1998 – 1 Oct 2000. Republic of Vietnam Gallantry Cross with Palm: 14 Feb-11 Mar 1968.

== Lineage ==
- Constituted as the 96th Troop Carrier Squadron on 25 May 1943

Activated on 1 July 1943
Inactivated on 18 October 1945

- Activated in the reserve on 6 March 1947

Redesignated 96th Troop Carrier Squadron, Medium on 27 June 1949
Ordered to Active Service on 1 May 1951
Inactivated on 4 May 1951

- Redesignated 96th Fighter-Bomber Squadron on 26 May 1952

Activated in the Reserve on 15 June 1952
Redesignated 96th Troop Carrier Squadron, Medium on 8 September 1957
Ordered to active service on 28 October 1962
Relieved from active service on 28 November 1962
Redesignated 96th Tactical Airlift Squadron on 1 July 1967
Redesignated 96th Airlift Squadron on 1 February 1992

=== Assignments ===
- 440th Troop Carrier Group, 1 Jul 1943 – 18 Oct 1945
- Second Air Force, 6 March 1947
- 440th Troop Carrier Group, 3 Sep 1947 – 4 May 1951
- 440th Fighter-Bomber Group (later 440th Troop Carrier Group), 15 June 1952
- 440th Troop Carrier Wing, 14 April 1959
- 934th Troop Carrier Group (later 934 Tactical Airlift Group 934 Airlift Group), 11 February 1963
- 934th Operations Group, 1 Aug 1992 – present

=== Stations ===
- Baer Field, Indiana, 1 July 1943
- Sedalia Army Air Field, Missouri, 9 July 1943
- Alliance Army Air Field, Nebraska, 7 September 1943
- Pope Field, North Carolina, 4 January 1944
- Baer Field, Indiana, 14–21 February 1944
- RAF Bottesford (AAF-481), England, 8 March 1944
- RAF Exeter (AAF-463), England, 26 April 1944 (operated from Ombrone Airfield, Italy, 18 July-24 August 1944)
- Reims/Champagne Airfield (A-62), France, 13 September 1944
- Le Mans Airfield (A-35), France, 28 September 1944
- Orleans/Bricy Airfield (A-50), 4 November 1944 – 18 October 1945
- Scott Field (later Scott Air Force Base), Illinois, 6 March 1947
- Wold-Chamberlain Field, Minnesota, 27 June 1949 – 4 May 1951
- Fort Snelling, Minnesota, 15 June 1952
- Minneapolis-St Paul International Airport (later Minneapolis-St Paul International Airport - Air Reserve Station), Minnesota, 8 January 1953 – present

=== Aircraft ===
- Douglas C-47 Skytrain (1943–1945)
- Curtiss C-46 Commando (1947–1951)
- North American P-51 Mustang (1952–1955)
- Lockheed F-80 Shooting Star (1955–1957)
- C-119 Flying Boxcar (1957–1970)
- Lockheed C-130 Hercules (1970 – present)
