= 95th Airlift Squadron =

95th Airlift Squadron

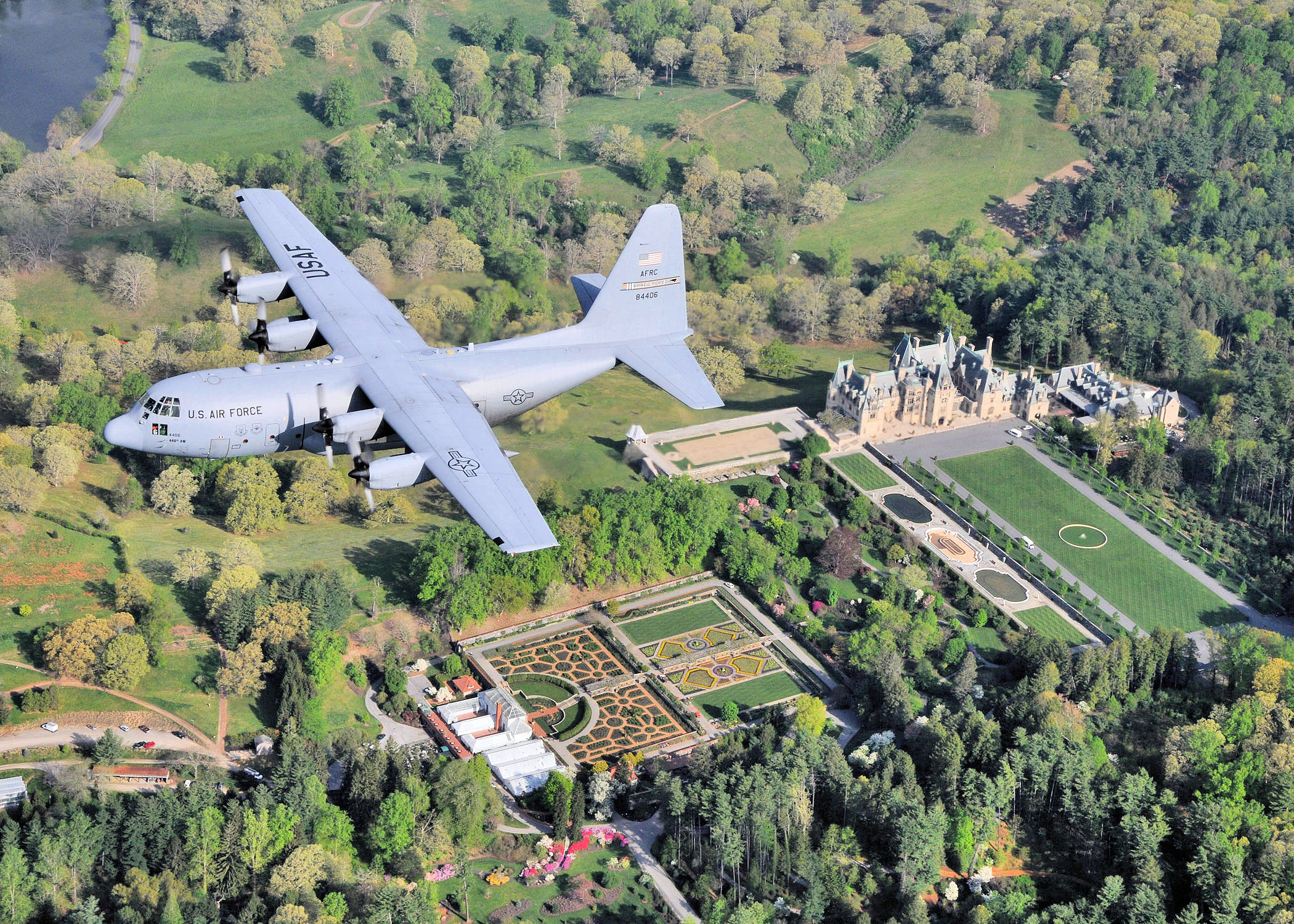
- 95th Airlift Squadron C-130 over the Biltmore Estate
- Active: 1943–1945; 1947–1951; 1952–2016
- Country: United States
- Branch: United States Air Force
- Role: Airlift
- Part of: Air Force Reserve Command
- Nickname(s): Flying Badgers
- Motto(s): On Time, On Target
- Engagements: Operation Overlord; Operation Dragoon; Operation Market Garden; Battle of Bastogne
- Decorations: Distinguished Unit Citation; Air Force Outstanding Unit Award; Republic of Vietnam Gallantry Cross with Palm

Insignia
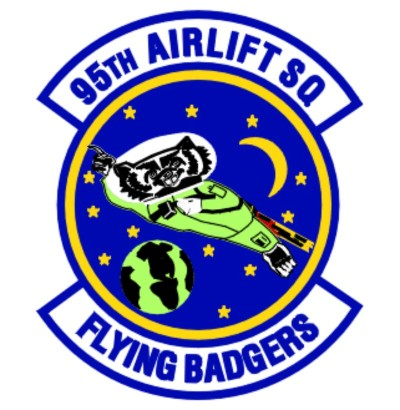
- 95th Airlift Squadron emblem (approved 5 January 1961)

The 95th Airlift Squadron is an inactive United States Air Force unit. It was last active at Pope Army Airfield, North Carolina, where it was assigned to the 440th Operations Group and operated Lockheed C-130 Hercules aircraft supporting the global reach mission worldwide.

== History ==
=== World War II ===
Activated in July 1943 as an I Troop Carrier Command Douglas C-47 Skytrain Squadron. After training in the United States, at various bases, sent to Baer Field, Indiana for final equipping with aircraft, personnel and other equipment. Deployed to IX Troop Carrier Command in February 1944 during the build-up prior to the Invasion of France.

During the D-Day invasion, the squadron dropped paratroops of the 101st Airborne Division in Normandy, subsequently flying numerous missions to bring in reinforcements and needed supplies. During the airborne attack on The Netherlands (Operation Market Garden, September 1944), the squadron deployed paratroops, towed gliders, and flew resupply missions. Later participated in the invasion of southern France in August 1944. The squadron supported the 101st Airborne Division in the Battle of the Bulge by towing gliders full of supplies near Bastogne on 27 December 1944. In addition, its units participated in the air assault across the Rhine River in early 1945 (Operation Varsity) and later flew numerous freight missions to carry gasoline, food, medicine, and other supplies to allied ground forces during the Western Allied invasion of Germany in April 1945 near Wesel. The squadron also hauled food, clothing, medicine, gasoline, ordnance equipment, and other supplies to the front lines and evacuated patients to rear zone hospitals. It transported displaced persons from Germany to France and Belgium after V-E Day. Remained in Europe during the summer of 1945, inactivating as part of the United States Air Forces in Europe, October 1945.

=== Air Force reserve and Korean mobilization ===
Reactivated in the reserve as a Curtiss C-46 Commando troop carrier squadron in Minneapolis, Minnesota during 1947. Was federalized as a result of the Korean War in 1951, squadron personnel and aircraft being sent to active-duty units as fillers, inactivated as an administrative unit a few days later.

=== Reserve fighter-bomber operations ===
Reactivated after the Korean War as a reserve fighter-bomber squadron in 1952 initially equipped with North American F-51 Mustangs, later upgraded to Lockheed F-80 Shooting Star jet aircraft.

=== Return to airlift mission ===
Redesignated back to a troop carrier squadron in 1957 and moved to Milwaukee's Billy Mitchell Field. Carried out theater transport operations and supported Air Force and Army units with troop carrier missions. Was activated during the 1962 Cuban Missile Crisis, carried Army units to South Florida in preparation of a possible invasion of Cuba. Returned Army personnel to home stations after situation was normalized and returned to reserve service.

The squadron flew airlift missions worldwide, including to Southeast Asia during the Vietnam War and to Southwest Asia during the Gulf War. It has also participated in training exercises, some involving the dropping or landing of airborne troops, and flew numerous humanitarian airlift missions.

=== Campaigns and decorations ===
- Campaigns: World War II: Rome-Arno; Normandy; Northern France; Southern France; Rhineland; Ardennes-Alsace; Central Europe. Southwest Asia: Defense of Saudi Arabia.
- Decorations: Distinguished Unit Citation: France, [6–7] Jun 1944. Air Force Outstanding Unit Awards: 1 Oct 1985 – 30 Sep 1987; 1 Oct 1990 – 30 Sep 1992; 2 Oct 1992 – 2 Oct 1993; 1 Jun 1997 – 30 Sep 1998; 1 Aug 2003 – 31 Jul 2005. Republic of Vietnam Gallantry Cross with Palm: 14 Feb 1968 – 6 Nov 1972.

== Lineage ==
- Constituted as the 95th Troop Carrier Squadron on 25 May 1943

Activated on 1 July 1943
Inactivated on 18 October 1945

- Activated in the reserve on 9 April 1947

Redesignated 95th Troop Carrier Squadron, Medium on 27 June 1949
Ordered to active service on 1 May 1951
Inactivated on 4 May 1951

- Redesignated 95th Fighter-Bomber Squadron on 26 May 1952

Activated in the Reserve on 15 June 1952
Redesignated 95th Troop Carrier Squadron, Medium on 8 September 1957
Ordered to active service on 28 October 1962
Relieved from active service on 28 November 1962
Redesignated 95th Tactical Airlift Squadron on 1 July 1967
Redesignated 95th Airlift Squadron on 1 February 1992
Inactivated on 30 September 2016

=== Assignments ===
- 440th Troop Carrier Group, 1 July 1943 – 18 October 1945
- Second Air Force, 9 April 1947
- 440th Troop Carrier Group, 3 September 1947 – 4 May 1951
- 440th Fighter-Bomber Group (later 440th Troop Carrier Group), 15 June 1952
- 440th Troop Carrier Wing, 14 April 1959
- 933d Troop Carrier Group (later 933d Tactical Airlift Group), 11 February 1963
- 440th Tactical Airlift Wing (later 440th Airlift Wing), 1 September 1975
- 440th Operations Group, 1 Aug 1992 – 30 September 2016

=== Stations ===
- Baer Field, Indiana, 1 July 1943
- Sedalia Army Air Field, Missouri, 9 July 1943
- Alliance Army Air Field, Nebraska, 7 September 1943
- Pope Field, North Carolina, 4 January 1944
- Baer Field, Indiana, 14–21 February 1944
- RAF Bottesford (AAF-481), England, 8 March 1944
- RAF Exeter (AAF-463), England, 26 April 1944 (operated from Ombrone Airfield, Italy, 18 July–24 August 1944)
- Reims/Champagne Airfield (A-62), France, 13 September 1944
- Le Mans Airfield (A-35), France, 28 September 1944
- Orleans/Bricy Airfield (A-50), France, 4 November 1944 – 18 October 1945
- Wold-Chamberlain Field, Minnesota, 9 April 1947 – 4 May 1951
- Minneapolis-St. Paul International Airport, Minnesota, 15 June 1952
- General Mitchell Field (later General Billy Mitchell Field, General Mitchell International Airport General Mitchell International Airpor Air Reserve Station), Wisconsin, 16 November 1957
- Pope Air Force Base (later Pope Army Air Field), North Carolina, 10 June 2007 – 30 September 2016

=== Aircraft ===
- Douglas C-47 Skytrain (1943–1945, 1955–1957)
- Curtiss C-46 Commando (1947–1951, 1952–1957)
- North American T-6 Texan (1949–1950, 1952–1955)
- Beechcraft T-11 Kansan (1949–1951)
- Beechcraft T-7 Navigator (1950)
- North American P-51 Mustang (1953–1954)
- Lockheed T-33 T-Bird (1954–1957)
- Lockheed F-80 Shooting Star (1954–1957)
- Fairchild C-119 Flying Boxcar (1957–1971)
- Lockheed C-130 Hercules (1971–2016)
