= 98th Troop Carrier Squadron =

98th Fighter-Bomber Squadron
- Active: 1943–1951
- Country: United States
- Branch: United States Air Force

The 98th Troop Carrier Squadron is an inactive United States Air Force unit. Its last assignment was with the 440th Troop Carrier Group, based at Wold-Chamberlain Field, Minnesota. It was inactivated on 4 May 1951.

== History ==
Activated in July 1943 as an I Troop Carrier Command C-47 Skytrain Squadron. After training in the United States, at various bases, sent to Baer Field, Indiana for final equipping with aircraft, personnel and other equipment. Deployed to Ninth Air Force in England, assigned to IX Troop Carrier Command in February 1944 during the build-up prior to the Invasion of France.

During the D-Day Invasion, the squadron dropped paratroops of the 101st Airborne Division in Normandy, subsequently flying numerous missions to bring in reinforcements and needed supplies. During the airborne attack on The Netherlands (Operation Market Garden, September 1944), the squadron dropped paratroops, towed gliders, and flew resupply missions. Later participated in the invasion of southern France in August 1944. The squadron supported the 101st Airborne Division in the Battle of the Bulge by towing gliders full of supplies near Bastogne on 27 December 1944. In addition, its units participated in the air assault across the Rhine River in early 1945 (Operation Varsity) and later flew numerous freight missions to carry gasoline, food, medicine, and other supplies to allied ground forces during the Western Allied invasion of Germany in April 1945 near Wesel. The squadron also hauled food, clothing, medicine, gasoline, ordnance equipment, and other supplies to the front lines and evacuated patients to rear zone hospitals. It transported displaced persons from Germany to France and Belgium after V-E Day. Remained in Europe during the summer of 1945, inactivating as part of the United States Air Forces in Europe, October 1945.

Reactivated in the reserve as a C-46 Commando troop carrier squadron in Minneapolis, Minnesota during 1947. Was federalized as a result of the Korean War in 1951, squadron personnel and aircraft being sent to active-duty units as fillers, inactivated as an administrative unit a few days later.

=== Operations and decorations ===
- Combat Operations: Airborne assaults on Normandy, the Netherlands, and Germany; relief of Bastogne, transportation of cargo and personnel in ETO during World War II.
- Campaigns: Normandy; Northern France; Rhineland; Ardennes-Alsace; Central Europe.
- Decorations: Distinguished Unit Citation: France, 6–7 Jun 1944.

=== Lineage ===
- Constituted 98th Troop Carrier Squadron on 25 May 1943

Activated on 1 July 1943
Inactivated on 18 October 1945

- Activated in the Reserve on 15 September 1947

Re-designated: 98th Troop Carrier Squadron, Medium on 27 June 1949
Ordered to active duty on 1 May 1951
Inactivated on 4 May 1951

=== Assignments ===
- 440th Troop Carrier Group, 1 Jul 1943 – 18 Oct 1945
- 440th Troop Carrier Group, 15 Sep 1947 – 4 May 1951

=== Stations ===
- Baer Field, Indiana, 1 July 1943
- Sedalia Army Air Field, Missouri, 9 July 1943
- Alliance Army Air Field, Nebraska, 7 September 1943
- Pope Field, North Carolina, 4 January 1944
- Baer Field, Indiana, 14–21 Feb 1944
- RAF Bottesford (AAF-481), England, 8 March 1944
- RAF Exeter (AAF-463), England, 26 April 1944

Operated from RAF Ramsbury (AAF-469), England, 7–23 Aug 1944

- Reims/Champagne Airfield (A-62), France, 13 September 1944
- Le Mans Airfield (A-35), France, 28 September 1944
- Orleans/Bricy Airfield (A-50), 4 Nov 1944 – 18 Oct 1945
- Wold-Chamberlain Field, Minnesota, 9 Apr 1947 – 4 May 1951

=== Aircraft ===
- C-47 Skytrain, 1943–1945
- C-46 Commando, 1947–1951
