= Southwest Airlines (disambiguation) =

Southwest Airlines is a major United States airline.

Other similarly named airlines:

- Air Southwest
- Air Southwest (Canada)
- China Southwest Airlines
- Pacific Southwest Airlines
- Southwest Airways, U.S. airline later known as Pacific Air Lines
- Southwest Air Lines, Japanese airline later known as Japan Transocean Air
- South West Aviation (South Sudan)
- South West Aviation (United Kingdom), a defunct British airline
