= Clyst Honiton =

Village in Devon, England

Coordinates: 50°44′N 3°26′W

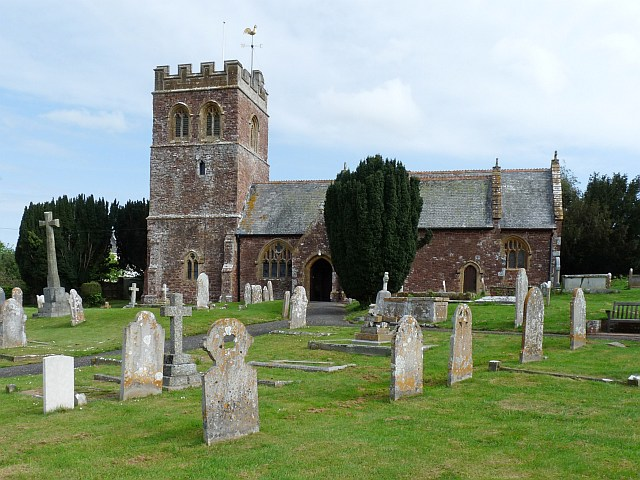
- Clyst Honiton Church

- Location within Devon
- Population: 295 (2001 census)
- Civil parish: Clyst Honiton
- District: East Devon
- Shire county: Devon
- Region: South West
- Country: England
- Sovereign state: United Kingdom
- UK Parliament: Exmouth and Exeter East

Clyst Honiton (or Honiton Clyst) is an English village and civil parish five miles from Exeter in the East Devon district, in the county of Devon. The church is St Michael and All Angels. Exeter International Airport which opened in 1938 is located on the outskirts of the village. The village was originally on the main A30 road from Exeter to Honiton but was bypassed in the 1990s. Another bypass to the east of the village linking the A30 to the new developments around Cranbrook opened in October 2013.

The parish is surrounded clockwise from the north by the parishes of Broadclyst, Rockbeare, Aylesbeare, Farringdon and Sowton. In 2001 its population was 295.

The village is mentioned in the Robyn Hitchcock song "Goodnight I Say".
