= LME =

LME may stand for:

- Le Mans Airfield (Aéroport Le Mans-Arnage LME LFRM)
- LME, Inc., a Minnesota-based trucking company
- Labour Movement for Europe, a socialist society affiliated to the UK Labour Party
- Large marine ecosystem
- Late Middle English
- Liquid metal embrittlement, of solid metals in the presence of some liquid metals
- London Metal Exchange, futures exchange, England
