= 933d Tactical Airlift Group =

933d Tactical Airlift Group

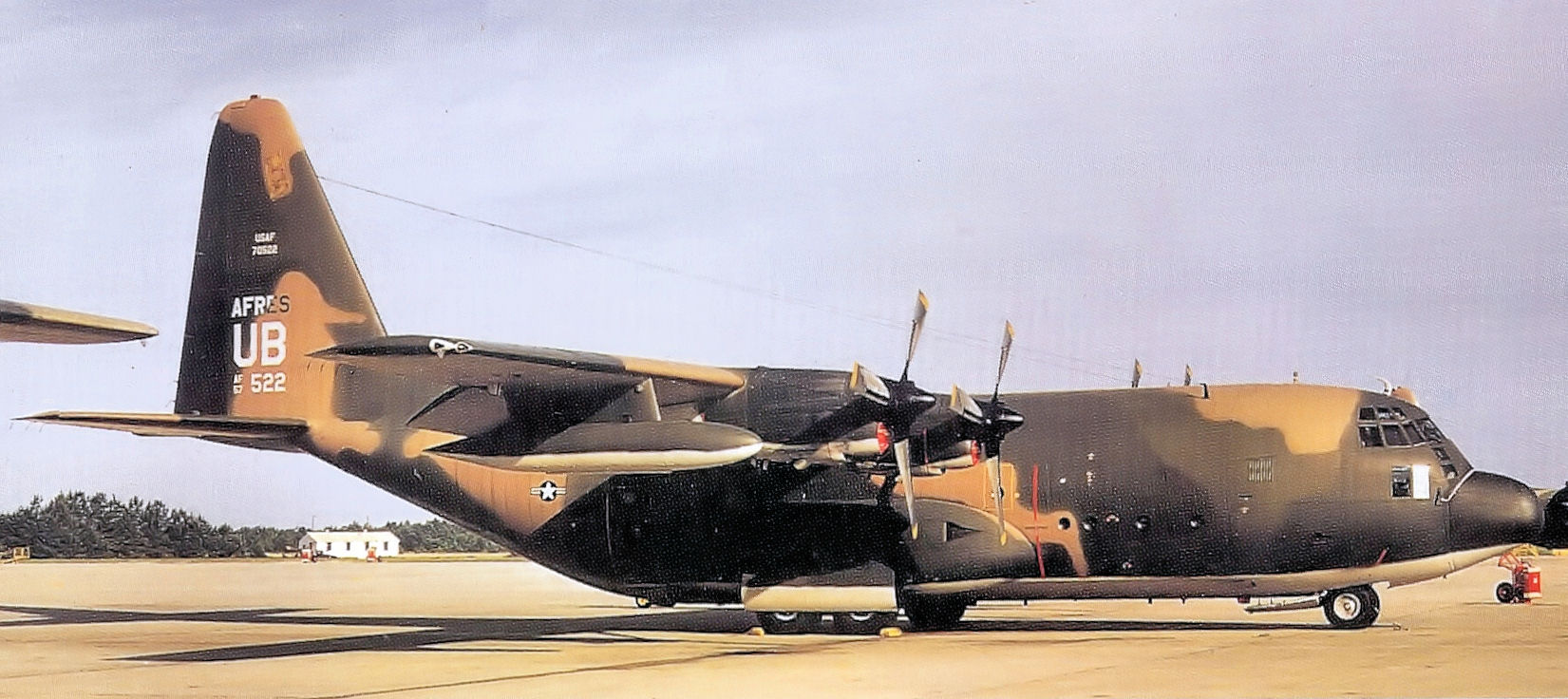
- C-130 Hercules of the Air Force Reserves (Note: Aircraft is Lockheed C-130A-55-LM Hercules serial 57-522, taken at Richards-Gebaur AFB about 1974.)
- Active: 1963-1975
- Country: United States
- Branch: United States Air Force
- Role: Airlift
- Part of: Air Force Reserve

The 933d Tactical Airlift Group is an inactive United States Air Force Reserve unit. It was last active with the 440th Tactical Airlift Wing, based at Billy Mitchell Field, Wisconsin. It was inactivated on 1 September 1975

== History ==
Following the mobilizations in 1961 and 1962 for the Berlin Crisis and the Cuban Missile Crisis, Continental Air Command (ConAC) realized that it was unwieldy to mobilize an entire wing unless absolutely necessary. Their original Table of Organization for each Wing was a wing headquarters, a troop carrier group, an Air Base Group, a maintenance and supply group, and a medical group. In 1957, the troop carrier group and maintenance and supply groups were inactivated, with their squadrons reassigned directly to the wing headquarters - despite the fact that many wings had squadrons spread out over several bases due to the Detached Squadron Concept dispersing Reserve units over centers of population.

To resolve this, in late 1962 and early 1963, ConAC reorganized the structure of its reserve Troop Carrier Wings by establishing fully deployable Troop Carrier Groups and inserting them into the chain of command between the Wing and its squadrons at every base that held a ConAC troop carrier squadron. At each base, the group was composed of a material squadron, a troop carrier squadron, a tactical hospital or dispensary, and a combat support squadron. Each troop carrier wing consisted of 3 or 4 of these groups. By doing so, ConAC could facilitate the mobilization of either aircraft and aircrews alone, aircraft and minimum support personnel (one troop carrier group), or the entire troop carrier wing. This also gave ConAC the flexibility to expand each Wing by attaching additional squadrons, if necessary from other Reserve wings to the deployable groups for deployments.

As a result, the 933d Troop Carrier Group was established with a mission to organize, recruit and train Air Force Reserve personnel in the tactical airlift of airborne forces, their equipment and supplies and delivery of these forces and materials by airdrop, landing or cargo extraction systems. The group was equipped with C-119 Flying Boxcars for Tactical Air Command airlift operations.

The group was one of two C-119 groups assigned to the 440th TCW in 1963, the other being the 934th Troop Carrier Group, at Minneapolis-St Paul International Airport, Minnesota.

Was upgraded to newer C-130A Hercules transports in 1971, retiring the Flying Boxcars. Group was inactivated in 1975 as part of post-Vietnam War drawdown.

== Lineage ==
- Established as the 933d Troop Carrier Group, Medium and activated on 15 January 1963 (not organized)

Organized in the reserve on 11 February 1963
Redesignated 933d Tactical Airlift Group on 1 July 1967
Inactivated on 1 September 1975

=== Assignments ===
- Continental Air Command, 15 January 1963 (not organized)
- 440th Troop Carrier Wing (later 440th Tactical Airlift Wing), 11 February 1963 – 1 September 1975

=== Components ===
- 95th Troop Carrier Squadron (later 95th Tactical Airlift Squadron), 11 February 1963 – 1 September 1975

=== Stations ===
- Billy Mitchell Field, Wisconsin, 11 February 1963 – 1 September 1975

=== Aircraft ===
- C-119 C-119 Flying Boxcar, 1963–1971
- Lockheed C-130 Hercules, 1971–1975
