= 934th Airlift Wing =

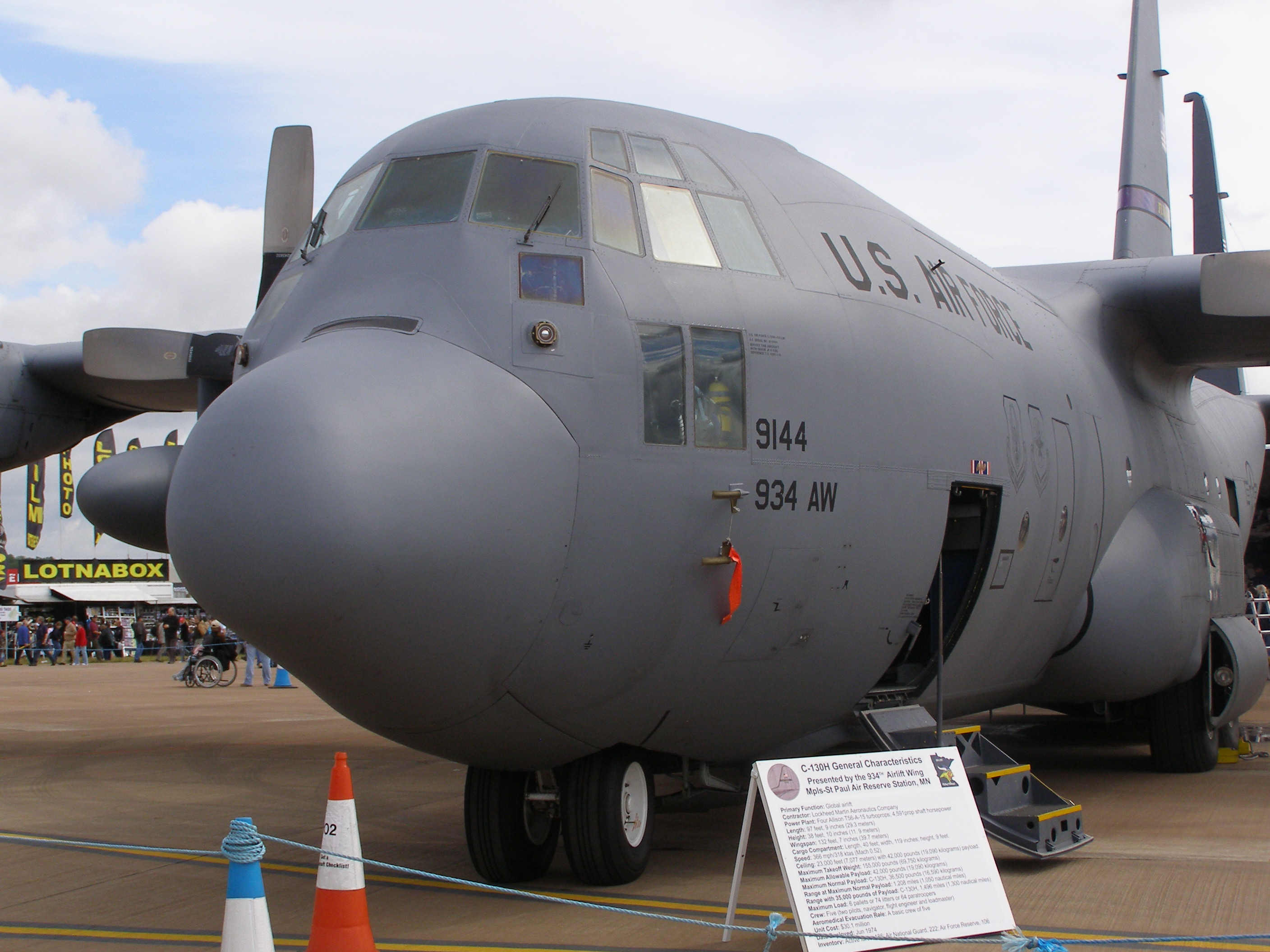
- 934th Airlift Wing Lockheed C-130H Hercules on display at the Royal International Air Tattoo in 2007
- Active: 1963—present
- Country: United States
- Branch: United States Air Force
- Role: Airlift
- Size: 1,300 Personnel
- Part of: Air Force Reserve Command
- Garrison/HQ: Minneapolis-St Paul Joint Air Reserve Station
- Nickname: Flying Vikings
- Decorations: Air Force Outstanding Unit Award; Republic of Vietnam Gallantry Cross with Palm

Commanders
- Current commander: Colonel Samuel J. Kraemer

Insignia
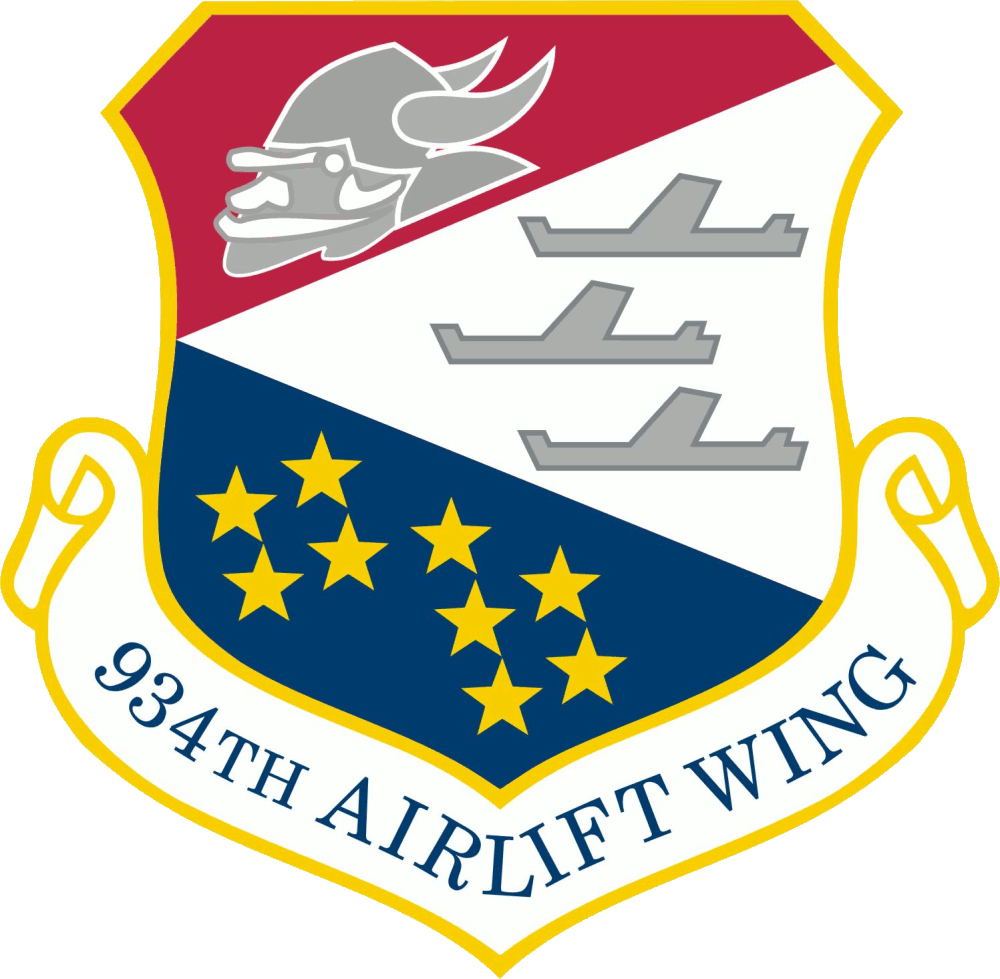
- 934th Airlift Wing emblem (approved 23 October 1964)

The 934th Airlift Wing is an Air Reserve Component of the United States Air Force. It is assigned to Twenty-Second Air Force, Air Force Reserve Command (AFRC) and is stationed at Minneapolis-St Paul Joint Air Reserve Station, Minnesota.

== Mission ==
The wing's mission is to fly C-130H3 cargo aircraft, both airlifting and airdropping cargo and personnel. Aeromedical evacuation of patients within the theater of operations is another facet of the mission. The 934th Airlift Wing supports the Air Force mission on a daily basis, providing airlift both in the United States and around the world.

== Units ==
- 934th Operations Group

96th Airlift Squadron

- 934th Maintenance Group
- 934th Mission Support Group
- 934th Aeromedical Staging Squadron

== History ==
=== Need for reserve troop carrier groups ===
After May 1959, the reserve flying force consisted of 45 troop carrier squadrons assigned to 15 troop carrier wings. (Note: There were an additional four rescue squadrons not assigned to the wings. Cantwell, p. 156) The squadrons were not all located with their parent wings, but were spread over thirty-five Air Force, Navy and civilian airfields under what was called the Detached Squadron Concept. The concept offered several advantages. Communities were more likely to accept the smaller squadrons than the large wings and the location of separate squadrons in smaller population centers would facilitate recruiting and manning. However, under this concept, all support organizations were located with the wing headquarters. Although this was not a problem when the entire wing was called to active service, mobilizing a single flying squadron and elements to support it proved difficult. This weakness was demonstrated in the partial mobilization of reserve units during the Berlin Crisis of 1961. To resolve this, at the start of 1962, Continental Air Command, (ConAC) determined to reorganize its reserve wings by establishing groups with support elements for each of its troop carrier squadrons. This reorganization would facilitate mobilization of elements of wings in various combinations when needed. October 28, 1962, 934th was activated for the Cuban Crisis

=== Activation of the 934th Troop Carrier Group ===
As a result, the 934th Troop Carrier Group was activated at Minneapolis-St Paul International Airport, Minnesota on 11 February 1963 as the headquarters for the 96th Troop Carrier Squadron, which had been stationed there since January 1953. Along with group headquarters, a Combat Support Squadron, Materiel Squadron and a Tactical Infirmary were organized to support the 96th.

If mobilized, the group was gained by Tactical Air Command (TAC), which was also responsible for its training. Its mission was to organize, recruit and train Air Force reservists in the tactical airlift of airborne forces, their equipment and supplies and delivery of these forces and materials by airdrop, landing or cargo extraction systems.

The group was one of two Fairchild C-119 Flying Boxcar groups assigned to the 440th Troop Carrier Wing in 1963, along with the 933d Troop Carrier Group at Billy Mitchell Field, Wisconsin.

In 1970, the group was re-equipped with the Lockheed C-130 Hercules. The group has provided worldwide airlift and airdrops of passengers and materiel since 1963. It has also periodically deployed to Panama, and later Puerto Rico, to fly cargo and personnel throughout Central and South America since 1979.

Upgraded to a Wing in 1994, it has deployed personnel and aircraft to participate in allied operations in the Persian Gulf area and the Balkans in 1990 and later. It has also participated in numerous joint airborne training exercises and humanitarian airlifts.

== Lineage ==
- Established as the 934th Troop Carrier Group, Medium and activated on 15 January 1963 (not organized)

Organized in the Reserve on 11 February 1963
Redesignated 934th Tactical Airlift Group on 1 July 1967
Redesignated 934th Airlift Group on 1 February 1992
Redesignated 934th Airlift Wing on 1 October 1994

=== Assignments ===
- Continental Air Command, 15 January 1963 (not organize)
- 440th Troop Carrier Wing (later 440th Tactical Airlift Wing), 11 February 1963
- 442d Tactical Airlift Wing, 1 April 1978
- 433d Tactical Airlift Wing, 1 October 1981
- 302d Tactical Airlift Wing, 1 April 1985
- 403d Tactical Airlift Wing (later 403d Airlift Wing), 31 December 1987
- 302d Airlift Wing, 1 August 1992
- Tenth Air Force, 1 October 1994
- Twenty-Second Air Force, 1 April 1997 – present

=== Components ===
- 934th Operations Group: 1 August 1992 – present
- 96th Troop Carrier Squadron (later 96th Tactical Airlift Squadron): 11 February 1963 – 1 August 1992
- 934th Maintenance Group
- 934th Aircraft Maintenance Squadron
- 934th Maintenance Squadron
- 934th Aeromedical Evacuation Squadron

=== Stations ===
- Minneapolis-St Paul International Airport (later Minneapolis-St Paul IAP-Air Reserve Station), Minnesota, 11 February 1963 – present

=== Aircraft ===
- Fairchild C-119 Flying Boxcar (1963–1970)
- Lockheed C-130 Hercules (1970 – Present)
