= Minneapolis–Saint Paul Joint Air Reserve Station =

United States Air Force base

Minneapolis–Saint Paul Air Reserve Station
- Fort Snelling Unorganized Territory, near Minneapolis, Minnesota in the United States of America
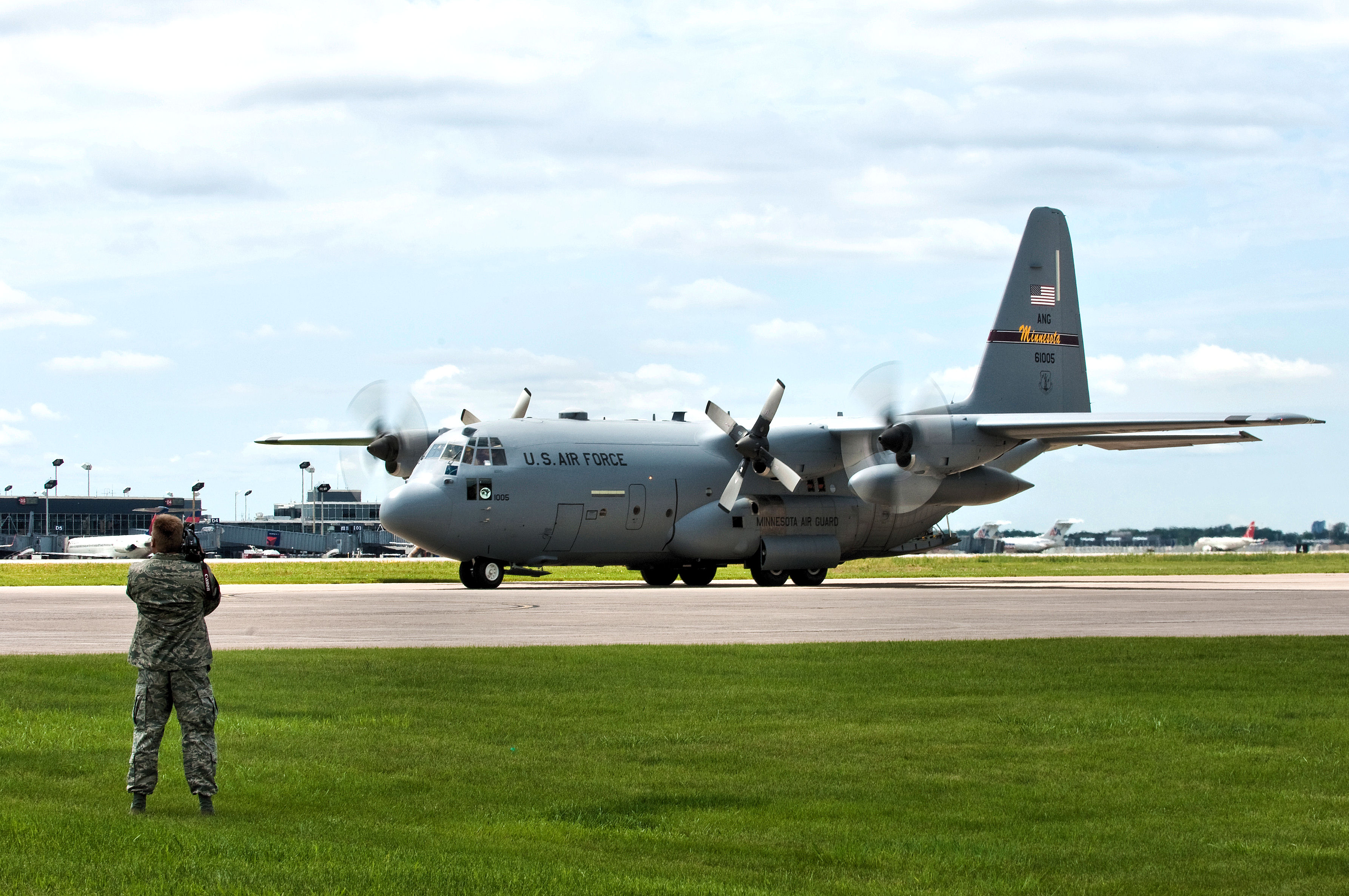
- A C-130 Hercules of the Minnesota Air National Guard's 133rd Airlift Wing taxiing at Minneapolis–Saint Paul ARS during 2010 after returning from a tour in Afghanistan.

Site information
- Type: Air Reserve Station
- Owner: Department of Defense
- Operator: US Air Force
- Controlled by: Air Force Reserve Command (AFRC)
- Condition: Operational
- Website: www.minneapolis.afrc.af.mil

Location
- Location in the United States
- Coordinates: 44°52′54″N 093°14′01″W

Site history
- Built: 1940
- In use: 1940 – present

Garrison information
- Garrison: 934th Airlift Wing (Host); 133rd Airlift Wing; Joint Force Headquarters Minnesota National Guard

Airfield information
- Identifiers: IATA: MSP, ICAO: KMSP, FAA LID: MSP, WMO: 726580
- Elevation: 256.6 metres (842 ft) AMSL
Runways
Direction	Length and surface
4/22	3,354.6 metres (11,006 ft) Concrete
12R/30L	3,048 metres (10,000 ft) Concrete
12L/30R	2,499.3 metres (8,200 ft) Concrete
17/35	2,438.4 metres (8,000 ft) Concrete
- Airfield shared with Minneapolis–Saint Paul International Airport; Source: Federal Aviation Administration

Minneapolis–Saint Paul Joint Air Reserve Station is a United States Air Force base, located at Minneapolis–Saint Paul International Airport. It is located in the Fort Snelling Unorganized Territory on the southeast border of Minneapolis, Minnesota. It was formerly the location of Naval Air Station Twin Cities.

== Overview ==
Minneapolis St. Paul International Airport Air Reserve Base is home to the United States Air Force Reserve's 934th Airlift Wing (934 AW) "Flying Vikings" who fly the C-130 Hercules aircraft. The 934 AW, which functions as the "host wing" for the installation, employs more than 1,300 Reservists of which about 250 are full-time Active Guard and Reserve (AGR) or Air Reserve Technician (ART) personnel. The 934th reports to the Air Force Reserve Command's 22d Air Force (22 AF) at Dobbins Air Reserve Base, Georgia.

The 934th's gaining active-duty force is the Air Mobility Command's 18th Air Force(18 AF) at Scott Air Force Base, Illinois. The wing directly or indirectly supports approximately 5,000 members of the Air Force, Air Force Reserve Command, Minnesota Air National Guard, U.S. Army Reserve, Minnesota Army National Guard, U.S. Navy Reserve, U.S. Marine Corps Reserve and the Minnesota Wing of the Civil Air Patrol.

In addition to the Air Force Reserve, MSPJARS is the home of the Minnesota Air National Guard's 133d Airlift Wing (133 AW). Like the 934 AW, the 133 AW also utilizes the C-130 Hercules, augmenting the active-duty Air Force with tactical airlift of troops, cargo, and medical patients anywhere in the world. Additionally, the 133 AW is prepared to support the State of Minnesota with troops capable of assisting in a disaster or other emergencies as directed by the Governor of Minnesota. There are five major units in the 133 AW: Headquarters Group; Maintenance Group; Operations Group; Medical Group; and Mission Support Group.

The Minnesota National Guard Joint Force Headquarters (JFHQ-MN) is a joint Army National Guard and Air National Guard command headquartered at MSPJARS. JFHQ-MN provides personnel, intelligence, operations, logistics, and resource guidance and support to the Major Commands in the Minnesota National Guard: 34th (Red Bull) Infantry Division; 1/34th Brigade Combat Team; 34th Combat Aviation Brigade; 84th Troop Command; 347th Regional Support Group; 175th Regional Training Institute; 133rd Airlift Wing; and the 148th Fighter Wing at Duluth Air National Guard Base.

JFHQ-MN coordinates military support at the request of the Governor in the event of a disaster and is capable of providing a joint command staff for federal military forces operating within the State of Minnesota.

== History ==
In 1920 a hangar was built on a former auto racing track to accommodate airmail service, and the 160-acre property became known as Speedway Field. In 1923, the airport was renamed Wold-Chamberlain Field in honor of two local pilots, Ernest Wold and Cyrus Chamberlain, who lost their lives in combat during World War I. The airport soon became home to Northwest Airways, which in 1926 won the government's airmail contract and acquired the airport's only hangar.

=== Navy ===
In 1928 Naval Reserve Air Station Minneapolis was created At Wold Chamberlain Field. That same year the name changed to Naval Reserve Air Base (NRAB) Minneapolis. In 1943 it was changed to NAS Minneapolis. During WWII it served as a training facility for aviation cadets. In 1946 the Navy established VP-911 at the base and changed the name to NAS Twin Cities. The squadron flew Consolidated PBY-5A and PBY-6A Catalinas until 1954. In 1979 the name changed to NARC Twin Cities.

=== Army Air Corps ===
In February 1942, after the United States' entry into World War II, the United States Army Air Corps 1454th Base Unit was assigned to Wold-Chamberlain Field to conduct a survey about the usefulness of the airport to the war effort. The unit's mission was to organize, coordinate and supervise the movement of cargo and passengers travelling though the airport by contract airlines and to and from Ferrying Command. Northwest Airlines remained in control of the control tower and flight facilities. Other construction was initiated to expand flight facilities, base operations, passenger service facilities, customs and port of entry facilities. The Army Corps of Engineers was authorized to expand the ramp facilities and also to expand the airfield.

Personnel from the Alaskan Wing, Air Transport Command arrived at the airport on December 29, 1942, to organize a control detachment. On September 20, 1943, the detachment was re designated as Station No. 11, Alaskan Wing, Air Transport Command. The airport became a key stop on what was designated the "Alaskan Route", in which aircraft were ferried north to Edmonton Airport in Northern Alberta on the Alaska Route, to support the Alaskan Campaign against the Japanese, and also for eventual transport to Siberia as part of Lend-Lease aid to the Soviet Union.

Minneapolis was also a stop on ATC's "Crimson Route", the ferrying route between the manufacturing facilities in Southern California and the combat bases being constructed in the United Kingdom. It operated as a refueling and maintenance base on the transport route north to Crystal II in the Canadian Northern Territories or Goose Air Station in Labrador to support the combat forces in the United Kingdom, North Africa and other destinations.

With the end of the war in September 1945, the military mission of the airport was changed on January 1, 1946, to be a supply depot for Air Transport Command cargo aircraft throughout the upper Great Lakes region and to serve as a terminus for transcontinental planes and their upkeep.

=== Continental Air Command ===
On July 1, 1948, with the inactivation of Air Transport Command, control of the military facilities was transferred to Continental Air Command (ConAC), with the 2465th Air Force Reserve Training Center being activated August 28. Its mission was to conduct reserve training. The 440th Troop Carrier Group (Medium) was activated at the field on September 3 equipped with C-47 Skytrains. The 440th trained for troop carrier operations in the Reserve, and became part of the 440th Troop Carrier Wing when it activated in June 1949. It was called to active duty on May 1, 1951, and inactivated four days later with its personnel and equipment being reassigned to other units as a result of the Korean War. After its federal service ended in January 1953, it was reactivated and after a short period as a Fighter-Bomber Group, it transitioned to C-119 Flying Boxcars in 1954. The 440th remained in Minneapolis until November 1957 when it was transferred to the new Air Reserve Station in Milwaukee, Wisconsin.

=== Air Defense Command ===
With the inactivation of the 440th Troop Carrier Group in May 1951, the active-duty Air Defense Command (ADC) brought the federalized Kentucky Air National Guard's 123d Fighter-Interceptor Wing to the airport later in May. The 123d FIG's 165th Fighter-Interceptor Squadron was equipped with F-51 Mustangs and trained until the end of its federal service in February 1952.

The F-51s were taken over by the active-duty 18th Fighter-Interceptor Squadron, under ADC's 514th Air Defense Group in February 1952. These World War II fighters, used as interceptors, were replaced by F-86F Sabre jet interceptors in 1953. The 514th was redesignated as the 475th Fighter-Interceptor Group (Air Defense) on August 18, 1955, as part of an ADC program to reactivate notable World War II combat units. The 18th FIS was also redesignated as the 432d Fighter-Interceptor Squadron. The F-94 Starfire-equipped 337th Fighter-Interceptor Squadron became the second interceptor squadron at Minneapolis later in 1955.

In late 1957, Air Defense Command began to wind down operations at Minneapolis, due to the expansion of the civilian airport and jet noise of the interceptors over the urban area surrounding the facility. The 475th FIG was inactivated on January 2, 1958.

=== Air Force Reserve ===
The USAF Reserve returned to Minneapolis on February 11, 1963, when the 934th Tactical Airlift Group was activated. Initially flying the C-119 Flying Boxcar, the unit has also periodically deployed to Panama, and later Puerto Rico, to fly cargo and personnel throughout Central and South America since 1979.

Upgraded to the C-130 in 1970, the 934th deployed personnel and aircraft to participate in allied operations in the Persian Gulf area and the Balkans in 1990 and later. It has also participated in numerous joint airborne training exercises and humanitarian airlifts.

=== Minnesota Air National Guard ===
The Minnesota 109th Fighter Squadron was allocated to the Air National Guard on May 24, 1946, at Minneapolis. During the Korean War it was activated, contributing pilots to Korea's "Mig Alley."

In the 1950s and early 1960s, the 109th Fighter Interceptor Squadron was providing active air defense commitments with 24-hour alert status. Threats by the Soviet Union to oust Western troops from West Berlin in 1961 prompted the "Berlin Crisis" and a call-up of selected National Guard forces throughout the nation. Included in this mobilization were members of the 133rd Air Transport Wing, Minnesota Air National Guard, who served in federal active service for 11 months while operating out of their home station at the Minneapolis-St. Paul Airport.

During the Vietnam War, although never officially mobilized, the Air Guard flew hundreds of supply and transport missions to Southeast Asia.

== Gallery ==
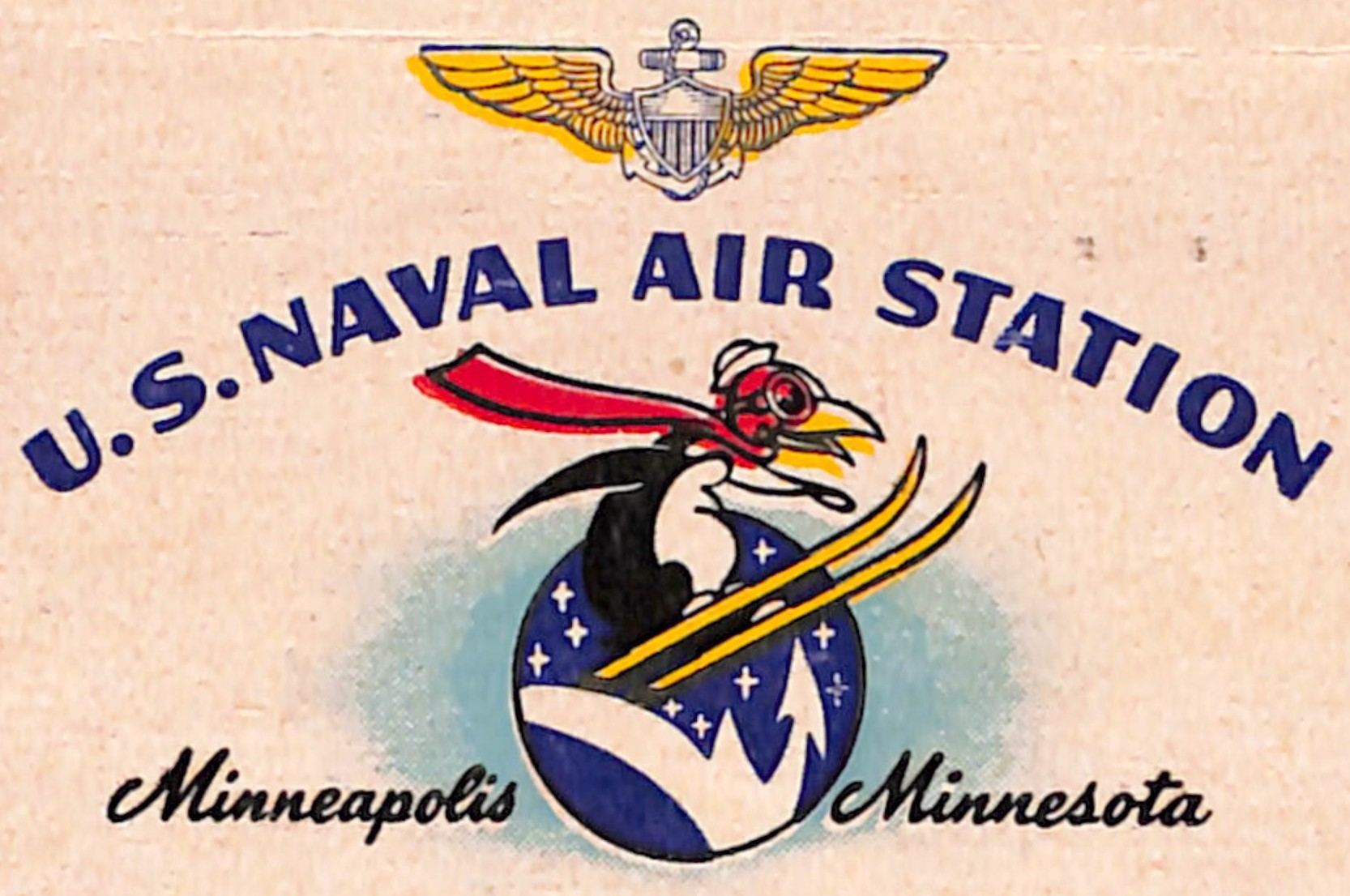
NAS Minneapolis insignia on a matchbook cover

== See also ==
- Minnesota World War II Army Airfields
- Air Transport Command
- Aerospace Defense Command Fighter Squadrons
