= 440th Operations Group =

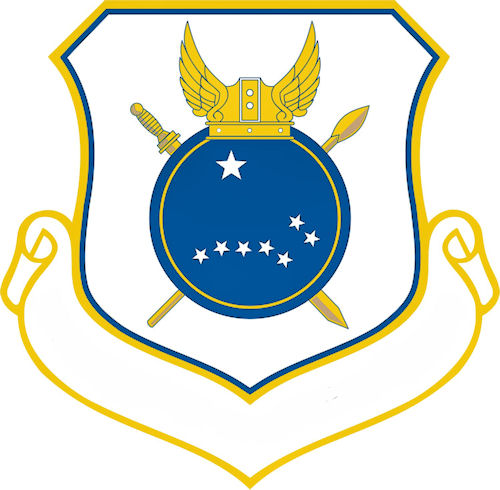
- Emblem of the 440th Operations Group
- Active: 1943–1945; 1947–1951; 1953–1959; 1992–present
- Country: United States
- Branch: United States Air Force Reserve

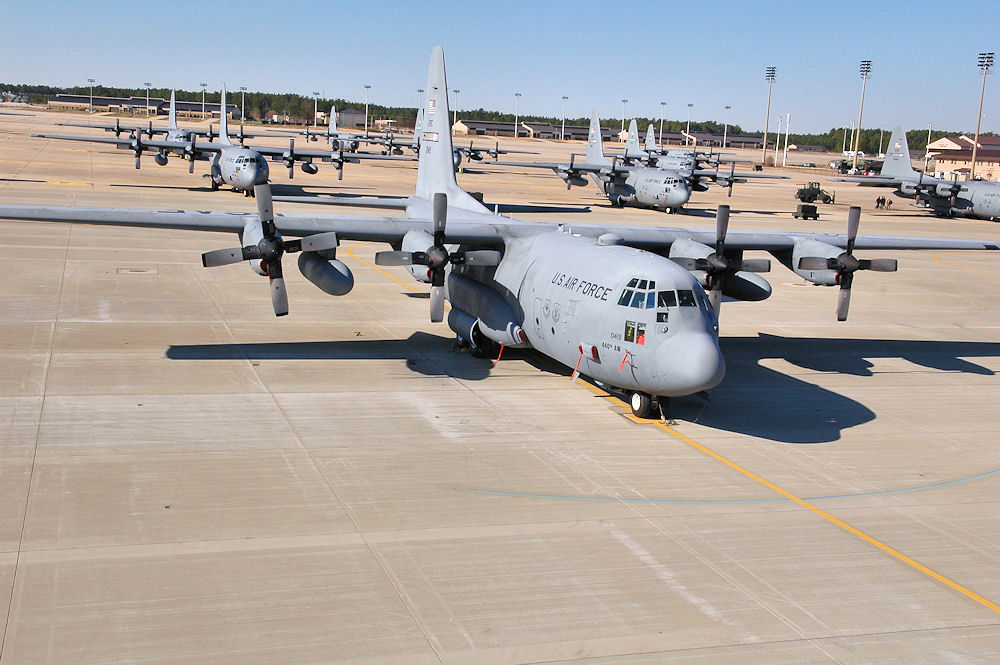
C-130s of the 440th Operations Group at Pope Air Force Base, N.C

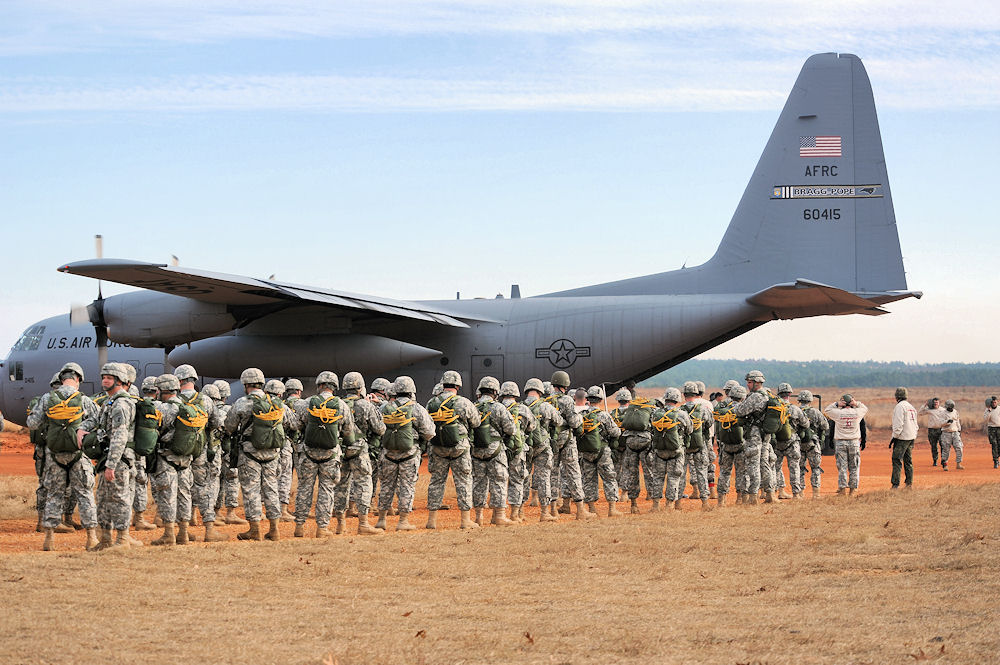
Paratroopers prepare to drop from a C-130 of the 440th Operations Group

The 440th Operations Group is an active United States Air Force Reserve unit. It is the flying component of the Twenty-Second Air Force 440th Airlift Wing, stationed at Pope Air Force Base, North Carolina.

The unit's World War II predecessor unit, the 440th Troop Carrier Group was a C-47 Skytrain transport unit assigned to Ninth Air Force in Western Europe. The 440th TCG dropped paratroops of the 101st Airborne Division near Carentan on the Cotentin Peninsula of France on 6 June 1944 and by transporting gasoline, ammunition, food, and other supplies to the same area on 7 June, being awarded a Distinguished Unit Citation for completing these missions during the Invasion of Normandy.

== Units ==
The 440th Operations Group (Tail Stripe Bragg-Pope) consists of the following units flying C-130 Hercules aircraft:

- 95th Airlift Squadron
- 440th Operations Support Squadron
- 36th Aeromedical Evacuation Squadron (AES)
- 2d Airlift Squadron (Active Assoc)
- 43d Aeromedical Evacuation Squadron (Active Assoc)

== History ==
For additional lineage and history, see 440th Airlift Wing

=== World War II ===
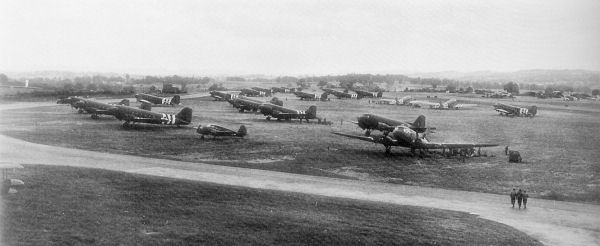
5 June 1944 photograph of C-47s of the 95th and 98th Troop Carrier Squadrons at RAF Exeter with freshly applied black/white invasion stripes to aid in aircraft identification from the ground. There was insufficient space to park all the aircraft on the concrete, so many were parked on grass turf.

Trained in the US and moved to England, February–March 1944, for duty with Ninth Air Force 50th Troop Carrier Wing, IX Troop Carrier Command.

Began operations by dropping paratroops of the 101st Airborne Division near Carentan on the Cotentin Peninsula on 6 June 1944 and by transporting gasoline, ammunition, food, and other supplies to the same area on 7 June, being awarded a Distinguished Unit Citation for completing these missions during the invasion of Normandy.

Began flying supply and evacuation missions between England and France after the invasion of the Continent. In July 1944 most of the group was sent to Italy where it transported supplies to Rome until August 1944. The "detachment" in Italy participated in the invasion of southern France, dropping paratroops of the 517th Parachute Infantry Regiment near Le Muy on 15 August and towing gliders carrying reinforcements to that area later in the day.

Meanwhile, those remaining in England continued to haul cargo, and on 10 August 1944 dropped supplies to an infantry battalion encircled at Mortain in northern France. The detachment returned to England on 25 August 1944. The air echelon moved to France on 11 September 1944, but returned immediately to England to participate in the airborne invasion of the Netherlands. Dropped paratroops of the 82d Airborne Division near Groesbeek on 17 September 1944 and released gliders with reinforcements on 18 and 23 September

By the end of Sep, the entire group had completed the move to France. On 26 December 1944, during the Battle of the Bulge, the group hauled gliders filled with supplies for the 101st Airborne Division encircled at Bastogne. In March 1945 it towed gliders with troops of the 17th Airborne Division to the battle area near Wesel during the airborne assault across the Rhine. Between 21 April and 14 May 1945, the group's air echelon operated from Conflans, France, to be closer to the front. The group transported food, clothing, medical supplies, gasoline, ammunition, and other cargo to the front lines and evacuated casualties to rear-zone hospitals.

After the war transported liberated prisoners and displaced persons. Inactivated in Europe on 18 October 1945.

=== Air Force Reserve ===
Activated in the US on 3 September 1947. Trained for troop carrier operations in the Reserve. Became part of the 440th Troop Carrier Wing when it activated in June 1949. Called to active duty on 1 May 1951 and inactivated four days later with its personnel and equipment being reassigned to other units as a result of the Korean War.

Activated again in the Reserve as a Fighter-Bomber Group the following year. Transitioned from fighter aircraft to C-119s, beginning in April 1957. In November 1957 the 440th Wing and the 95th Squadron moved on paper to Wisconsin, leaving the 440th Group and the 96th Squadron in Minnesota. The Group inactivated on 14 April 1959 as a result of the Tri-Deputate organization implementation.

Activated on 1 August 1992. Personnel participated in exercises, humanitarian and other airlift missions, worldwide.

=== Lineage ===
- Established as 440th Troop Carrier Group on 25 May 1943

Activated on 1 July 1943
Inactivated on 18 October 1945

- Activated in the Reserve on 3 September 1947

Redesignated 440th Troop Carrier Group, Medium on 27 June 1949
Ordered to Active Duty on 1 May 1951
Inactivated on 4 May 1951

- Redesignated 440th Fighter-Bomber Group on 26 May 1952

Activated in the Reserve on 15 June 1952
Redesignated 440th Troop Carrier Group, Medium on 8 September 1957
Inactivated on 14 April 1959
Redesignated: 440th Tactical Airlift Group on 31 July 1985 (Remained inactive)

- Redesignated: 440th Operations Group on 1 August 1992

Activated in the Reserve on 1 August 1992.

=== Assignments ===
- I Troop Carrier Command, 1 July 1943
- 53d Troop Carrier Wing, July 1943
- 61st Troop Carrier Wing, c. 20 July 1943
- 60th Troop Carrier Wing, c. 31 December 1943
- IX Troop Carrier Command, 25 March 1944
- 50th Troop Carrier Wing, March 1944
- United States Air Forces in Europe, c. 29 September – 18 October 1945
- 322d Troop Carrier Wing (later, 322d Air Division), 3 September 1947
- 440th Troop Carrier Wing, 27 June 1949 – 4 May 1951
- 440th Fighter-Bomber (later, 440th Troop Carrier) Wing, 15 June 1952 – 14 April 1959
- 440th Airlift Wing, 1 August 1992–present

=== Components ===
- 95th Troop Carrier (later, 95th Fighter-Bomber; 95th Troop Carrier; 95th Airlift) Squadron (9X): 1 July 1943 – 18 October 1945; 3 September 1947 – 4 May 1951; 15 June 1952 – 14 April 1959 (detached 16 November 1957 – 14 April 1959); 1 August 1992–present
- 96th Troop Carrier Squadron (6Z): 1 July 1943 – 18 October 1945; 3 September 1947 – 4 May 1951; 15 June 1952 – 14 April 1959
- 97th Troop Carrier Squadron (W6): 1 July 1943 – 18 October 1945; 15 September 1947 – 4 May 1951; 15 June 1952 – 1 July 1957; 16 November 1957 – 25 March 1958
- 98th Troop Carrier Squadron (8Y): 1 July 1943 – 18 October 1945; 15 September 1947 – 4 May 1951.

=== Stations ===
- Baer Field, Indiana, 1 July 1943
- Sedalia Army Air Field, Missouri, 10 July 1943
- Alliance Army Air Field, Nebraska, 7 September 1943
- Pope Field, North Carolina, 4 January 1944
- Baer Field, Indiana, 14–22 February 1944
- RAF Bottesford (AAF-481), England, c. 11 March 1944 (air echelon), 23 March 1944 (ground echelon)
- RAF Exeter (AAF-463), England, 26 April 1944
- Reims/Champagne Airfield (A-62), France, 11 September 1944
- Le Mans Airfield (A-35), France, 30 September 1944
- Orleans/Bricy Airfield (A-50), France, 2 November 1944 – 18 October 1945
- Wold-Chamberlain Muni (later, Minneapolis-St Paul Intl) Airport, Minnesota, 3 September 1947 – 4 May 1951
- Fort Snelling, Minnesota, 15 June 1952
- Minneapolis-St Paul Intl Airport, Minnesota, 8 January 1953 – 14 April 1959
- General Mitchell International Airport, Wisconsin, 1 August 1992
- Pope AFB, North Carolina, 10 June 2007–present

=== Aircraft ===
- C-47 Skytrain, 1943–1945; 1948
- C-53 Skytrooper, 1944–1945
- C-109 Liberator Express, 1945
- C-46 Commando, 1949–1951; 1952–1957
- F-51 Mustang, 1953–1954
- T-33 Shooting Star, 1954–1957
- F-80 Shooting Star, 1954–1957
- C-119 Flying Boxcar, 1957-Undetermined
- C-130 Hercules, 1992–present
