= South West Aviation =

Airline in Exeter, England

South West Aviation Ltd. was a British airline formed in August 1966 to undertake air charter work from Exeter Airport, Devon. In late 1972 the airline was taken over by Air Freight.

== History ==
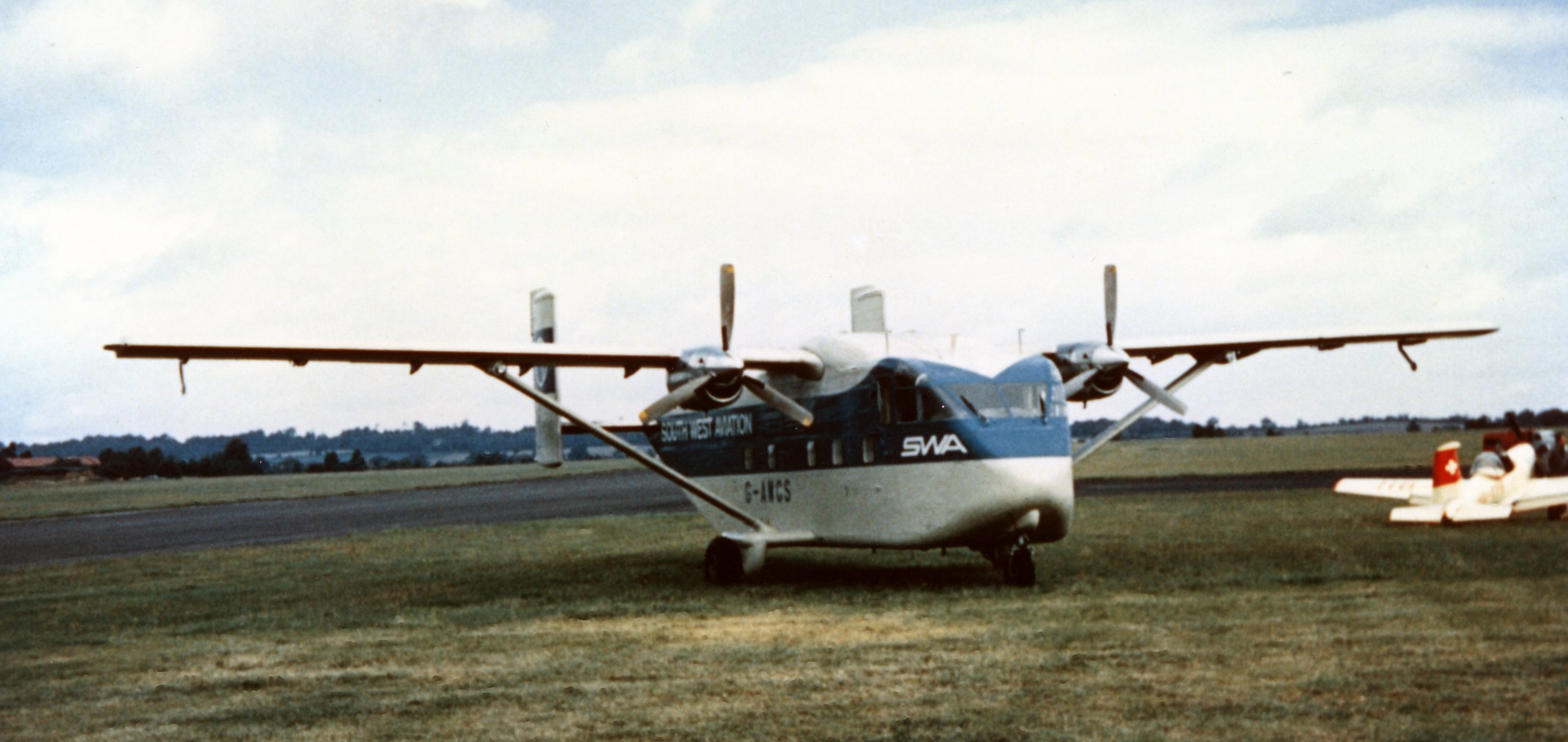
Short Skyvan at Halfpenny Green in 1971

The air company started operating air taxi and charter work with a twin-engined Piper Aztec and Beechcraft Travel Air from September 1966. In May 1968 the company bought a Douglas DC-3 which enabled it to expand into passenger and freight charters from both Exeter airport and Hurn Airport. A second DC-3 was soon acquired. The charters were flown around the British Isles, Channel Islands and into Northern France.

Also in 1968 the company bought a Short Skyvan which enabled it to operate out of small grass airfield in South West England for charters and parachute drooping, although the aircraft was also used to operate a scheduled service between Heathrow and Plymouth from 1970. The airline also operated summer time scheduled services between Exeter, Cherbourg and Southampton and on behalf of Dan-Air a service between Bristol and the Isle of Mann.

In November 1971, two leased Britten-Norman Islanders temporarily displaced the Skyvan on the Heathrow route while the aircraft underwent major overhaul, but following disappointing winter loads this service was discontinued at the end of January 1972. By this time, South West was in financial trouble and entered voluntary liquidation early in the following month. All but the Dakotas were sold as a result, but following a creditors meeting in March, a new company was formed with the backing of a merchant bank. South West continued flying for another six months, mainly on the basis of a substantial contract to carry fresh flowers, fruit and vegetables from the Channel Islands to Bournemouth. Thereafter, in October 1972, South West Aviation together with its surviving Dakota was sold to Air Freight of Ashford in Kent and fully merged in thre following weeks.

== Fleet ==
South West Aviation fleet in 1970
Aircraft type	Total	Orders	Remarks
Douglas DC-3	2	0	
Piper Aztec	1	0	
Short Skyvan	1		
Total	4	0	

== See also ==
- List of defunct airlines of the United Kingdom
