= Exeter Airport =

Airport in Devon, South West England

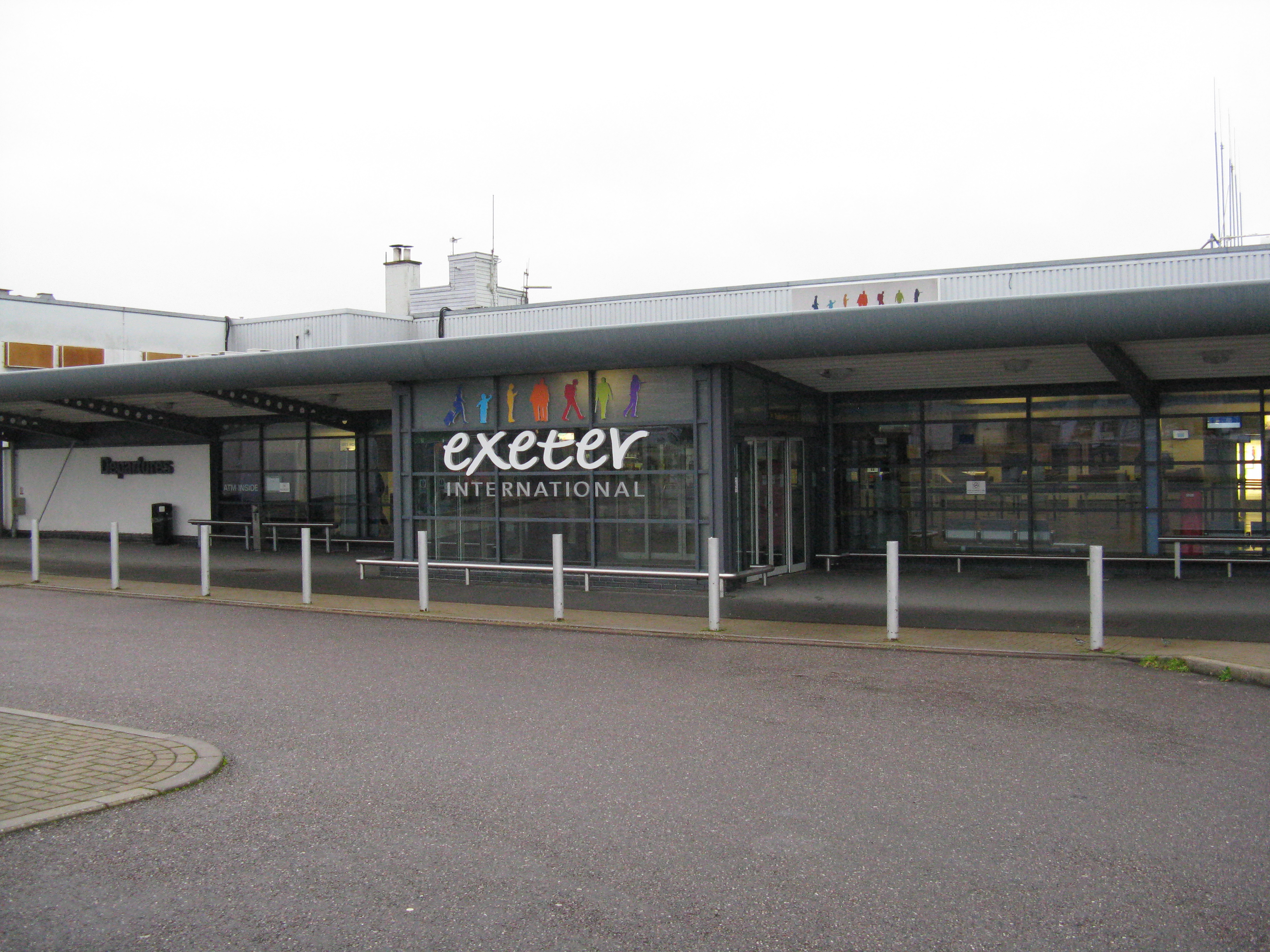
- IATA: EXT; ICAO: EGTE

Summary
- Airport type: Public
- Owner: Rigby Group
- Operator: Regional & City Airports
- Serves: Devon, Cornwall, Somerset, Dorset
- Location: Clyst Honiton, Devon
- Focus city for: TUI Airways
- Elevation AMSL: 102 ft (31 m)
- Coordinates: 50°44′04″N 003°24′50″W
- Website: www.exeter-airport.co.uk

Map
- Location in Devon EGTE (England)

Runways
Direction	Length		Surface
Direction	m	ft	Surface
08/26	2,076	6,811	Asphalt

Statistics (2022)
- Passengers: 382,223
- Passenger change 21-22: ▲201%
- Aircraft Movements: 6,386
- Movements change 21-22: ▲57%

Exeter Airport (IATA: EXT, ICAO: EGTE), formerly Exeter International Airport, is an international airport located at Clyst Honiton in East Devon, close to the city of Exeter and within the county of Devon, South West England. Exeter has a CAA Public Use Aerodrome Licence (Number P759) that allows flights for the public transport of passengers or for flying instruction. The airport offers both scheduled and holiday charter flights within Europe.

In 2007, the airport handled over 1 million passengers per year for the first time, although passenger throughput subsequently declined, recovering to 931,000 passengers in 2018. In 2019, passenger numbers once again passed the 1 million mark, due in part to Ryanair operating several new flights to/from the airport. Prior to its collapse in 2020, the airline Flybe accounted for over 80% of the airport's passenger numbers. Passenger numbers declined sharply to 148,000 in 2020 due to the COVID-19 pandemic. Since the COVID-19 pandemic, Exeter Airport's passenger numbers have recovered to approximately 500,000 per year (as of 2024).

== Location ==
Exeter Airport is located 4 miles (6.4 km) east of the city of Exeter and is approximately 170 miles (270 km) west south west of London. To the south, it is connected by the A30 dual carriageway which can be accessed from the east and the M5 in the west, just 1.5 miles (2.4 km) away. The M5 enables links to Bristol and the Midlands. There is no railway station at the airport. The closest, Cranbrook, is 2.2 miles (3.5 km) miles away by road. There is also a bus link to Exeter St Davids railway station.

== History ==
Exeter Airport was situated on land acquired by Exeter Corporation by compulsory purchase. It was leased and operated by Straight Corporation who also set up the Exeter Aero Club. The airfield officially opened on 31 May 1937 and operated from a "tented" terminal before the permanent buildings were complete. Jersey Airways immediately inaugurated a summer service of eight flights per week from Jersey in de Havilland DH.84 Dragons. Railway Air Services ran connecting flights on to Plymouth and Bristol.

=== Wartime use ===
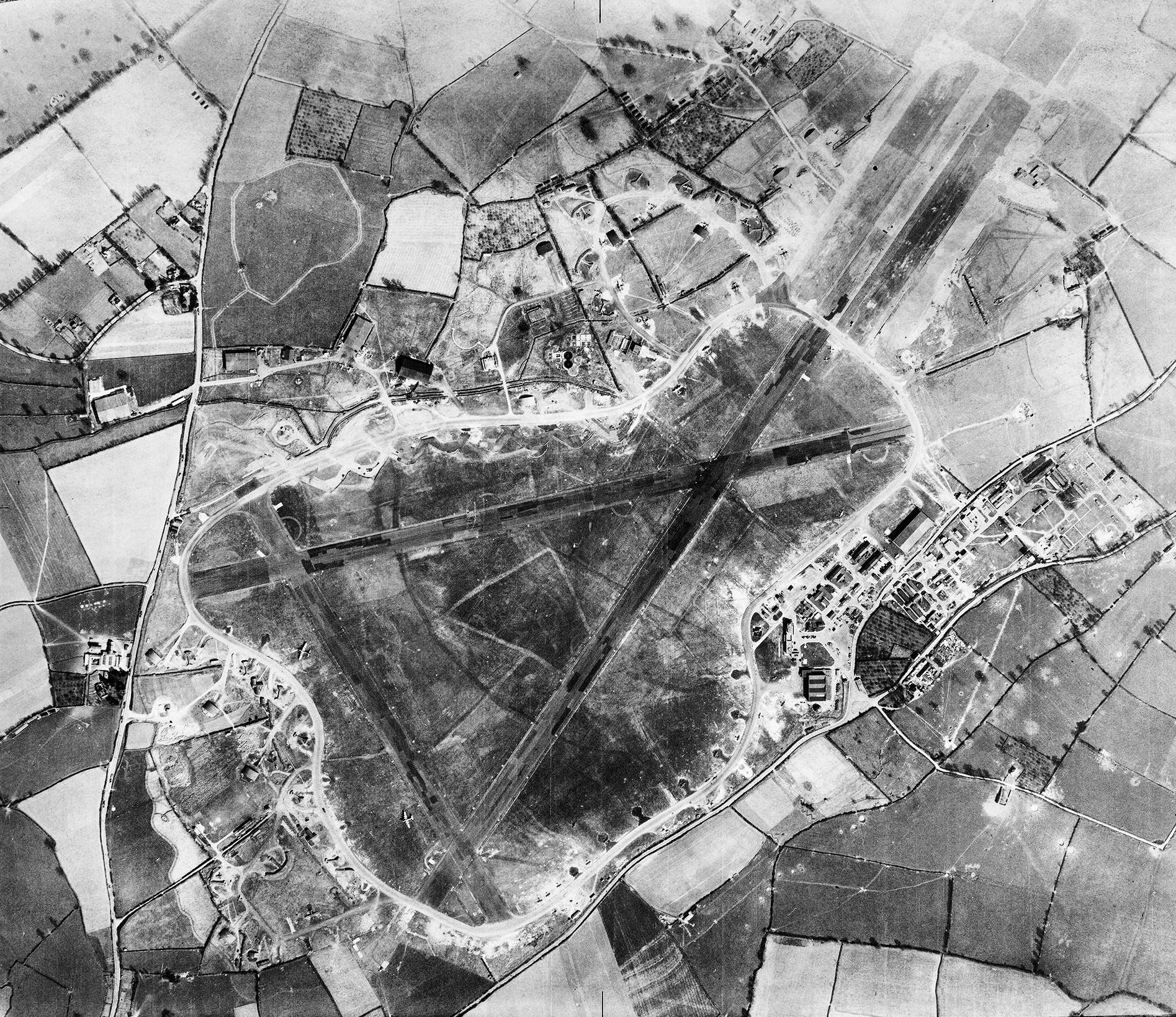
Aerial photograph of RAF Exeter, 20 March 1944. The long runway is 08/26, the other two being 02/20 and 13/31. The latter two were closed at undisclosed dates.

In the Second World War, RAF Exeter was an important RAF Fighter Command airfield during the Battle of Britain. RAF Exeter was used by the United States Army Air Forces (USAAF) Ninth Air Force as a D-Day troop transport base with Douglas C-47 Skytrain transports dropping paratroops near Carentan to land on the Normandy Beachhead. It was known as USAAF Station AAF-463.

Two brass plaques on the wall near the airport's observation lounge commemorate the activities of 3 squadrons of the Polish Air Forces in France and Great Britain that were based at Exeter during World War II, and commend their actions in defence of the city of Exeter.

==== Battle of Britain ====
RAF Exeter was home to the following Squadrons of No 10 Group during the Battle of Britain:

- No. 213 (Ceylon) Squadron from 18 June 1940
- No. 87 (United Provinces) Squadron from 5 July 1940
- No. 601 (County of London) Squadron AAF from 7 September 1940

Despite efforts at camouflage, including painting the runways, Exeter attracted the Luftwaffe and administrative and technical buildings were destroyed.

The same month that 213 Squadron arrived, the RAF established the Gunnery Research Unit at Exeter from "A" Flight of the Armament Testing Squadron.

==== U.S. use ====
Exeter met the requirement of basing USAAF troop carrier groups close to where units of the 101st Airborne Division were located and within reasonable range of the expected area of operations.

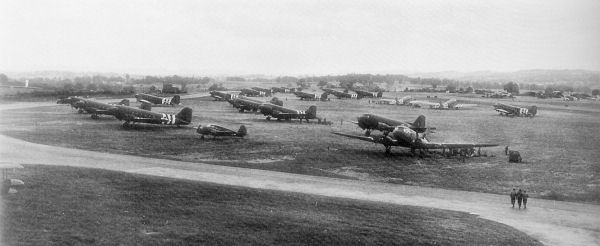
5 June 1944 photograph of C-47s of the 95th and 98th Troop Carrier Squadrons at RAF Exeter with freshly applied black/white invasion stripes to aid in aircraft identification from the ground. There was insufficient space to park all the aircraft on the concrete, so many were parked on grass turf.

The 440th Troop Carrier Group arrived on 15 April 1944 which consisted of the: 95th Troop Carrier Squadron (TCS), 96th TCS, 97th TCS & 98th TCS, with over 70 Douglas C-47 Skytrain/Douglas C-53 Skytrooper aircraft. There were insufficient hardstandings to accommodate all the aircraft so many had to be parked on the turf, some areas being supported by tarmac. The 440th was a group of Ninth Air Force's 50th Troop Carrier Wing, IX Troop Carrier Command. The 98th TCS remained at Exeter until 7 August, when it began operating from RAF Ramsbury. On 11 September, the headquarters of the 440th TCG was established at the group's new base at Reims, France (ALG A-62D), and the last of the air echelon left Exeter two days later.

=== Postwar use ===
Walruses of an RAF air-sea rescue flight were the next tenants, and these were joined by a glider training unit early in 1945. Post-war, Exeter was reclaimed by Fighter Command and a French Supermarine Spitfire squadron, No. 329 (GC I/2 'Cicognes'), which came and stayed until November 1945. Gloster Meteors and de Havilland Mosquitos made a brief appearance the following spring. No. 691 Squadron's target-towing Vultee A-31 Vengeances, which had been present for more than a year, proved to be the last RAF flying unit of the Second World War period based at Exeter. When No. 691 Squadron departed in the summer of 1946, the station was made available for civil use, being officially transferred to the Ministry of Civil Aviation on 1 January 1947, although there was still some reserve RAF activity until the 1950s.

There is also a report that No. 3/4 Civilian Anti-Aircraft Co-operation Unit RAF, located at the airport, only disbanded in 1971.

Scheduled services to the Channel Islands began in 1952, and charter flights to various locations followed. A new terminal building was opened in the early 1980s, and various other improvements, including a runway extension, were carried out over the following years to establish Exeter as an important airport in the West Country. Exeter was a joint RAF/civil airfield in the 1960s.

On 5 January 2007, a majority share of the airport was sold by Devon County Council to Regional and City Airports Ltd, a consortium led by construction firm Balfour Beatty. On 26 June 2013, the airport was bought by the Patriot Aerospace division of Rigby Group, which also owns Coventry Airport.

In August 2016, Exeter Airport recorded their highest passenger throughput in a single month since September 2008, with 100,374 passengers passing through its terminal. New services to Glasgow and the first route to be supported by the new Government Regional Air Connectivity fund to Norwich, contributed to a 19% increase in passenger numbers during the month of August. During 2018, the runway was resurfaced and energy-efficient LED lighting (including runway centreline lights) was installed.

In 2019, the airport was ranked fourth in the UK by Which? magazine of 30 airports for customer satisfaction, with a score of 73%.

=== Royal Air Force Units ===
The following squadrons were also here at some point:

- No. 16 Squadron RAF
- No. 19 Squadron RAF
- No. 21 Squadron RAF
- No. 26 (South African) Squadron RAF
- No. 42 Squadron RAF
- No. 66 Squadron RAF
- No. 93 Squadron RAF
- No. 124 (Baroda) Squadron RAF
- No. 125 (Newfoundland) Squadron RAF
- No. 131 (County of Kent) Squadron RAF
- No. 151 Squadron RAF
- No. 165 (Ceylon) Squadron RAF
- No. 222 (Natal) Squadron RAF
- No. 225 Squadron RAF
- No. 247 (China-British) Squadron RAF
- No. 257 (Burma) Squadron RAF
- No. 263 (Fellowship of the Bellows) Squadron RAF
- No. 266 (Rhodesia) Squadron RAF
- No. 275 Squadron RAF
- No. 278 Squadron RAF
- No. 282 Squadron RAF
- No. 286 Squadron RAF
- No. 307 Polish Night Fighter Squadron
- No. 308 Polish Fighter Squadron
- No. 310 (Czechoslovak) Squadron RAF
- No. 317 Polish Fighter Squadron
- No. 406 Squadron RCAF
- No. 421 Squadron RCAF
- No. 504 (County of Nottingham) Squadron AAF
- No. 536 Squadron RAF
- No. 610 (County of Chester) Squadron AAF
- No. 616 (South Yorkshire) Squadron AAF
- 803 Naval Air Squadron
- 816 Naval Air Squadron
- 825 Naval Air Squadron
- 834 Naval Air Squadron
- 841 Naval Air Squadron

The following units were also here at some point:

- No. 3 Civilian Anti-Aircraft Co-operation Unit RAF - disbanded 1 July 1954
- No. 3 Glider Training School RAF
- No. 4 Air Experience Flight RAF
- No. 10 Reserve Flying School RAF
- No. 37 Elementary and Reserve Flying Training School RAF
- No. 78 (Signals) Wing Calibration Flight RAF
- No. 84 Gliding School RAF
- No. 624 Gliding School RAF
- No. 1487 (Fighter) Gunnery Flight RAF
- No. 2767 Squadron RAF Regiment
- No. 2790 Squadron RAF Regiment
- No. 2791 Squadron RAF Regiment
- No. 3209 Servicing Commando
- HQ Western Sector RAF

== Airlines and destinations ==
The following airlines operate regular scheduled flights to and from Exeter:

Airlines	Destinations
Aer Lingus	Belfast–City, Dublin
Aurigny	Guernsey
Isles of Scilly Skybus	Seasonal: Isles of Scilly
KLM	Amsterdam
Loganair	Edinburgh, Jersey
Ryanair	Alicante, Málaga; Seasonal: Faro, Palma de Mallorca Porto
TUI Airways	Lanzarote, Tenerife–South; Seasonal: Chambéry, Corfu, Dalaman, Gran Canaria, Heraklion, Ibiza, Kos, Menorca, Palma de Mallorca, Paphos, Rhodes, Zakynthos

== Other tenants ==
- Corporate aviation services including a private lounge are provided by XLR Executive Jet Centre
- There is one flight training organisation based at the airport: Aviation South West, which offers a range of training from the Private Pilot Licence to the Commercial Pilots Licence and Instrument Rating.
- Dublin Aerospace operates the Exeter Aerospace hangar which provides base maintenance services on multiple aircraft, such as: ATR 42 family; Bombardier DHC - 8 Family; & Embraer ERJ 170 & 190 Series aircraft.
- Iscavia Ltd is based in Hangar 49, on the North-Side of Exeter Airport and provides aircraft maintenance, avionics, airworthiness certification, hangarage, aircraft parts, help and advice.
- Devon Air Ambulance and National Police Air Service (NPAS) share a purpose-built facility on the northern side of the airfield, having vacated the police headquarters at Middlemoor, Exeter in 2014.

== Statistics ==
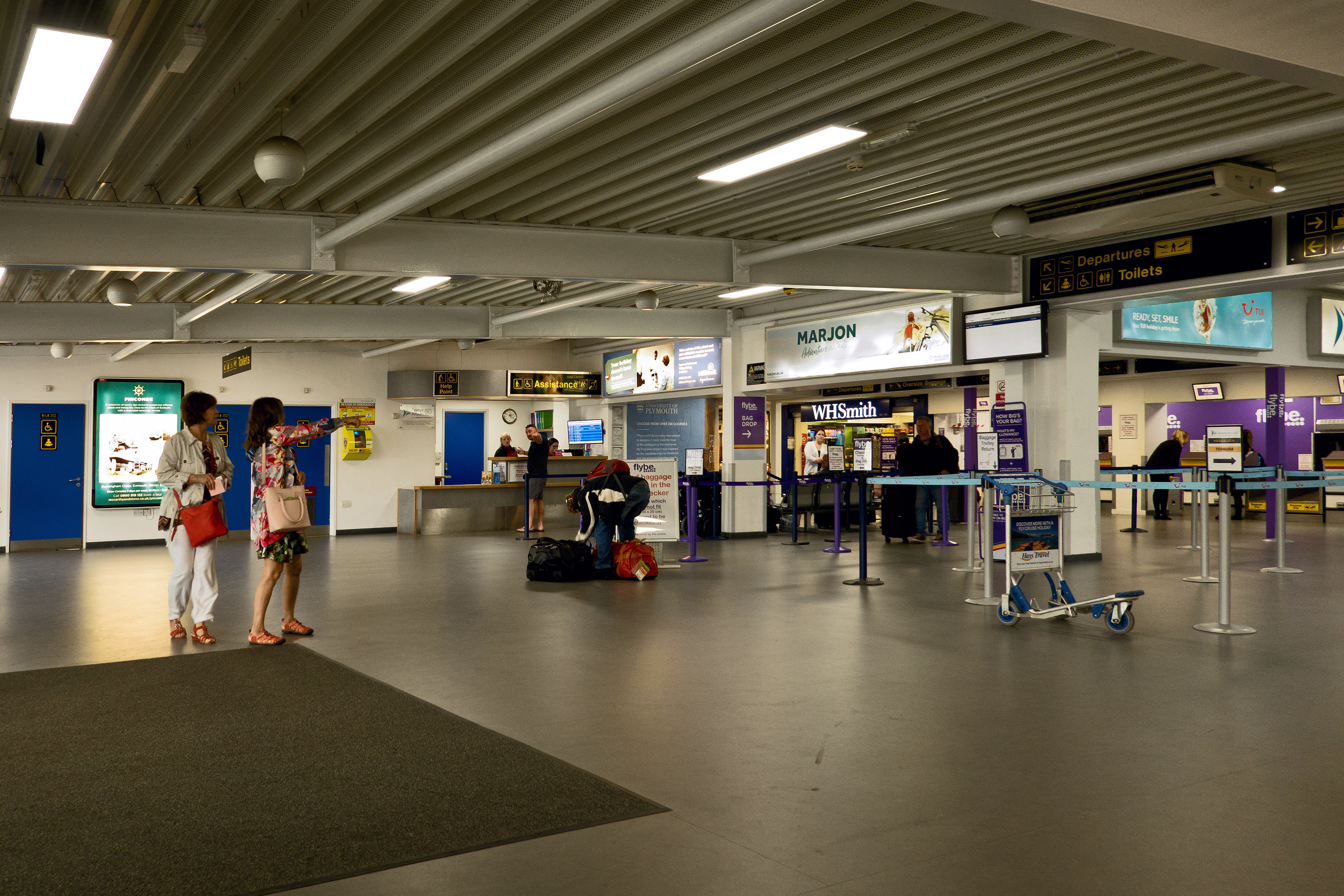
Terminal interior

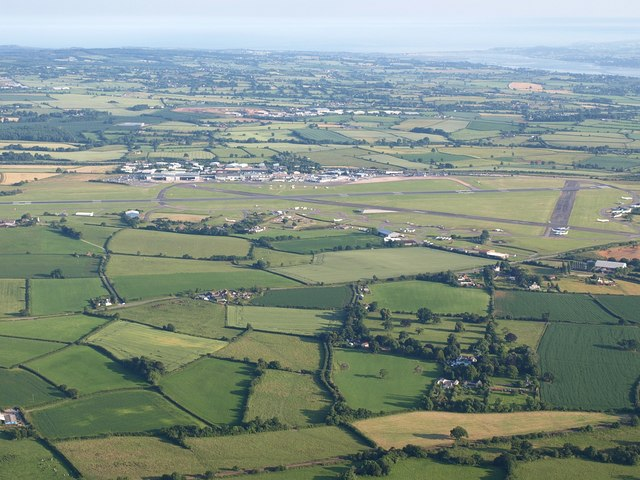
Aerial view

The ten busiest routes by air passenger numbers are listed below.

Busiest routes to or from Exeter (2024)
Rank	Airport	Total passengers	Change 2023 / 24
1	Palma de Mallorca	52,943	▲46.3%
2	Alicante	39,504	▲36.7%
3	Belfast–City	39,828	▼2.4%
4	Málaga	27,778	▼3.0%
5	Dublin	27,762	▲10.0%
6	Jersey	27,477	▼2.6%
7	Edinburgh	27,405	▲14.2%
8	Tenerife–South	21,122	▼0.0%
9	Lanzarote	20,627	▼21.6%
10	Faro	20,417	▲39.3%

== Accidents and incidents ==
- On 19 January 2021, a West Atlantic Boeing 737-400 freighter having just performed flight NPT05L from East Midlands Airport made a very hard landing at Exeter Airport, causing multiple creases in the fuselage. The aircraft was written off.

== See also ==
- List of Royal Air Force stations
- List of former Royal Air Force stations
- South West Aviation
