= 440th Airlift Wing =

440th Airlift Wing

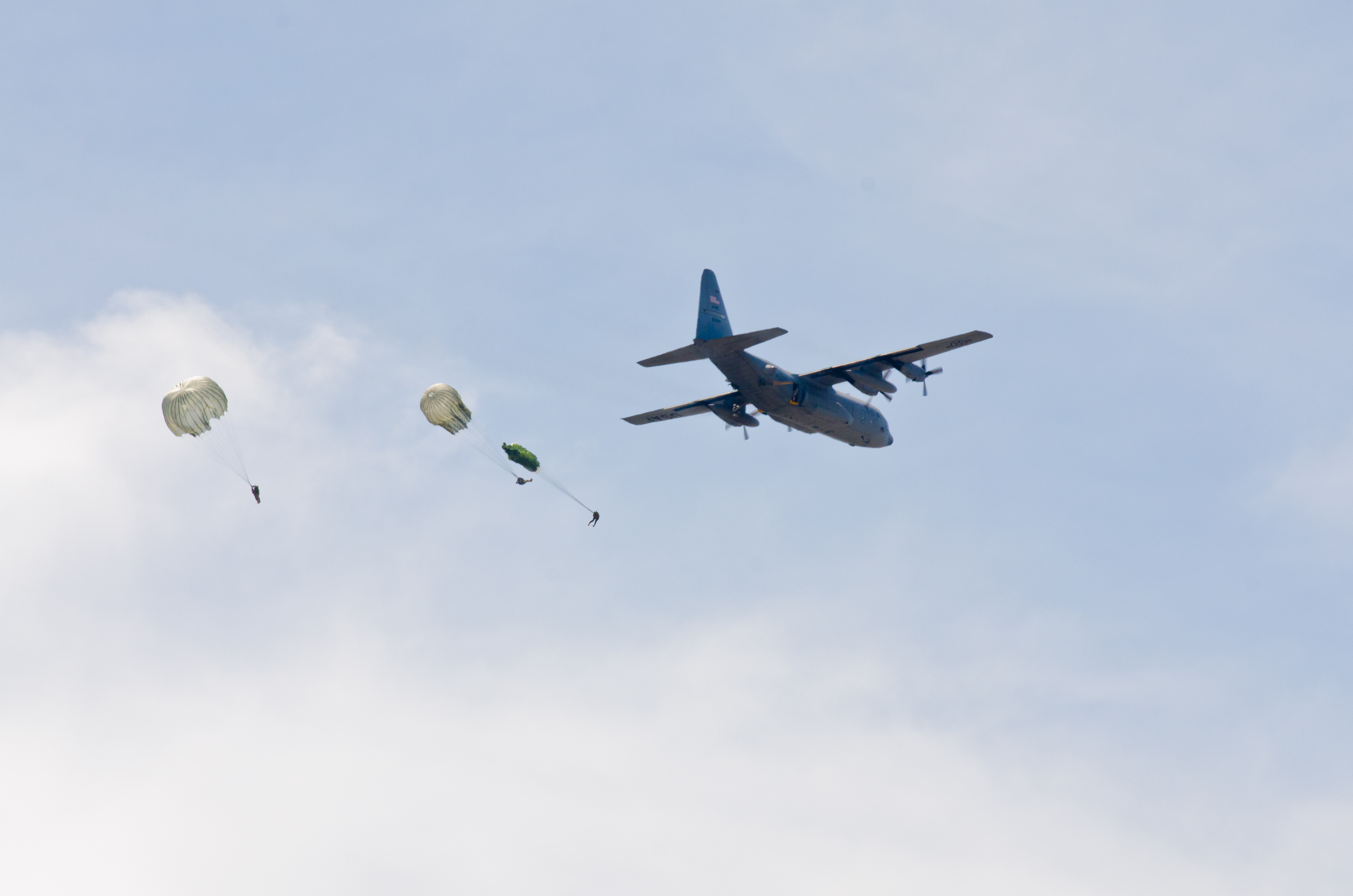
- Wing C-130 Hercules drops soldiers in an exercise at Fort Bragg
- Active: 1949–1951; 1952–2016
- Country: United States
- Branch: United States Air Force
- Role: Airlift
- Part of: Air Force Reserve Command
- Garrison/HQ: Pope Army Airfield, North Carolina
- Motto: Nunquam non-Paratus Latin Never Unprepared
- Decorations: Air Force Outstanding Unit Award; Republic of Vietnam Gallantry Cross with Palm

Insignia
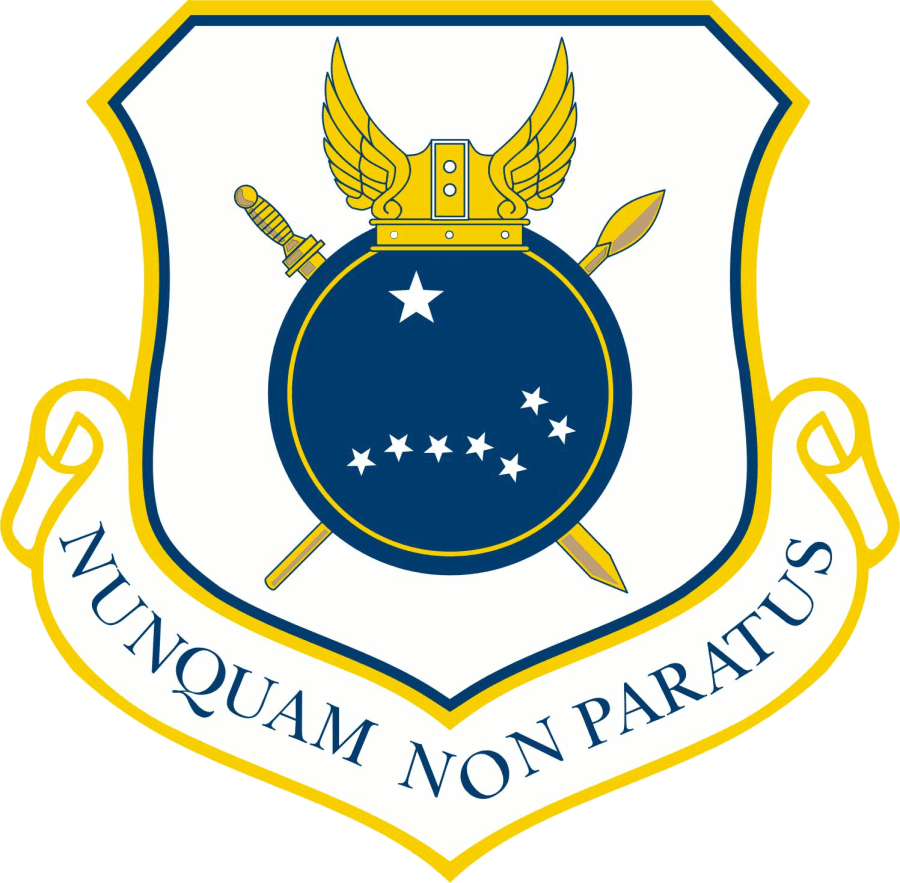
- 440th Airlift Wing emblem (approved 14 November 1958)

The 440th Airlift Wing is an inactive United States Air Force Reserve unit last assigned to Twenty-Second Air Force. It was last stationed at Pope Army Airfield, part of Fort Bragg in North Carolina.

== Mission ==
The 440th Airlift Wing's mission in peacetime was to maintain readiness for its wartime mission of personnel and cargo movement and of combat formation airdrop of cargo and personnel. The unit supported Operation Iraqi Freedom, with its mission extending to the Middle East into Europe and the Pacific. Airmen were deployed throughout the world to support Air Mobility Command's global reach mission. During the wing's tenure at Pope Field, it worked alongside the 43rd Airlift Group.

== Units ==
The 440th had one senior officer in charge of the wing and three group commanders (operations, maintenance and mission support) and 1 medical squadron commander who oversaw the 19 units that made up the 440th. The units that made up the 440th were manned by about 1,400 reservists and civilians. About 220 of the civilians employed by the 440th were "ARTs", or Air Reserve Technicians. An ART's civilian job requires the man or woman to be a member of the Reserve.

The majority of Reserve training was completed during unit training assemblies or "UTA" weekends. Each reservist completed one weekend a month of training each year. Besides two days of training each month Reservists must schedule and complete a minimum of 15 days of training during a calendar year. Reservists also opted for additional training to attend schools, maintain flying proficiency or to support special projects.

Major components of the wing were:

- 440th Operations Group
- 440th Maintenance Group
- 440th Medical Squadron
- 440th Mission Support Group

== History ==
For related history, see 440th Operations Group

=== Initial activation and mobilization for the Korean War ===
The wing was first activated as the 440th Troop Carrier Wing at Wold-Chamberlain Field, Minnesota in June 1949, when Continental Air Command (ConAC) reorganized its flying units under the wing base organization system, which united the flying units and supporting units under a single wing. Its flying element, the 440th Troop Carrier Group had been at Wold-Chamberlain since the fall of 1947. The wing was equipped with Curtiss C-46 Commandos, but also flew trainer aircraft under the supervision of the 2465th Air Force Reserve Training Center. Although the 440th was manned at only 25% of normal strength, its combat group was authorized four squadrons rather than the three of active duty units.

The 440th was mobilized for the Korean War, as were all reserve combat units. This action was effective on 1 May 1951. Along with other Tenth Air Force units, it was activated in the second wave of reserve units being called up. Its personnel were distributed as fillers to other organizations, with Strategic Air Command getting first pick of these mobilizees. The unit's aircraft were distributed to other organizations as well, and the wing was inactivated three days after its call-up.

=== Fighter operations ===
The wing was redesignated 440th Fighter-Bomber Wing, and in June 1952, reactivated at Fort Snelling, Minnesota, where it replaced the 930th Reserve Training Wing. The reserve mobilization for the Korean war, however, had left the reserves without aircraft, and the unit did not receive aircraft until July. Although the wing was titled a fighter bomber wing, it trained in an air defense role. A few months after activation, the wing moved from Snelling to adjacent Minneapolis-Saint Paul International Airport. As a fighter unit, the wing initially flew World War II era North American F-51 Mustangs, but received jet powered Lockheed F-80 Shooting Stars in 1954.

In the mid-1950s, the Joint Chiefs of Staff were pressuring the Air Force to provide more wartime airlift. At the same time, about 150 Fairchild C-119 Flying Boxcars became available from the active force. Consequently, in November 1956 the Air Force directed ConAC to convert three fighter bomber wings to the troop carrier mission by September 1957.

=== Return to troop carrier operations ===
In September 1957, the wing became the 440th Troop Carrier Wing once again and began training with C-119 Flying Boxcars. In addition to the conversion of fighter bomber units to troop carrier, within the Air Staff was a recommendation that the entire reserve fighter mission given to the Air National Guard and replaced by the troop carrier mission. Cuts in the budget in 1957 led to a reduction in the number of reserve wings from 24 to 15 and of squadrons from 55 to 45. The reductions included the elimination of all reserve flying units at Minneapolis-St Paul, with the exception of the 96th Troop Carrier Squadron.

The wing was not inactivated in this reorganization. As mentioned, the changes included inactivation of all remaining fighter bomber wings. The 438th Fighter-Bomber Wing at General Mitchell Field, Wisconsin was inactivated, and the 440th moved on paper to General Mitchell to replace it. The wing began to use inactive duty training periods for Operation Swift Lift, transporting high priority cargo for the air force and Operation Ready Swap, transporting aircraft engines, between Air Materiel Command's depots.

Since 1955, the Air Force had been detaching Air Force Reserve squadrons from their parent wing locations to separate sites. The concept offered several advantages: communities were more likely to accept the smaller squadrons than the large wings and the location of separate squadrons in smaller population centers would facilitate recruiting and manning. As it finally evolved, ConAC's plan called for placing Air Force Reserve units at fifty-nine installations located throughout the United States. The 95th Troop Carrier Squadron was the only one of the wing's flying units that moved with the wing to General Mitchell Field. The 97th Troop Carrier Squadron was activated at Chicago O'Hare International Airport, where it replaced another victim of the 1957 cuts to the reserves, the 437th Troop Carrier Wing. A few months later, in March 1958, the 97th Squadron moved and was reassigned, reducing the wing to two flying squadrons.

At General Mitchell Field, the wing initially trained with the 2473d Air Reserve Flying Center, but in 1958, the center was inactivated and some of its personnel were absorbed by the wing. In place of active duty support for reserve units, ConAC adopted the Air Reserve Technician Program, in which a cadre of the unit consisted of full-time personnel who were simultaneously civilian employees of the Air Force and held rank as members of the reserves. The following April, the wing converted to the Dual Deputate organization. (Note: Under this plan flying squadrons reported to the wing Deputy Commander for Operations and maintenance squadrons reported to the wing Deputy Commander for Maintenance) The 440th Troop Carrier Group was inactivated and all flying squadrons were directly assigned to the wing.

=== Activation of groups under the wing ===
Although the dispersal of flying units under the Detached Squadron Concept was not a problem when the entire wing was called to active service, mobilizing a single flying squadron and elements to support it proved difficult. This weakness was demonstrated in the partial mobilization of reserve units during the Berlin Crisis of 1961.

To resolve the mobilization problem, at the start of 1962 ConAC determined to reorganize its reserve wings by establishing groups with support elements for each of its troop carrier squadrons. This reorganization would facilitate mobilization of elements of wings in various combinations when needed. However, as this plan was entering its implementation phase, another partial mobilization, which included the 440th Wing, occurred for the Cuban Missile Crisis, with the units being released on 28 November 1962. The formation of troop carrier groups was delayed until February for wings that had been mobilized. The 933d Troop Carrier Group at General Mitchell Field and the 934th Troop Carrier Group at Minneapolis-St Paul were assigned to the wing on 11 February.

Volunteer aircrews also supported military operations in the Dominican Republic in May 1965. Tragedy struck the wing on 5 June 1965 when a C-119 (Flight Number 680) under the command of Maj. Louis Giuntoli was lost without a trace in the infamous Bermuda Triangle area. Nine other wing members were on the plane.

Milwaukee reservists flew emergency supplies to snowbound Indian reservations in the western U.S. in December 1967. The 440th went through another name change in 1967 when it became the Air Force Reserve's 440th Tactical Airlift Wing (440 TAW), operationally-gained by the Tactical Air Command (TAC). Wing personnel also flew equipment and supplies to Gulfport, Mississippi in August 1969, after Hurricane Camille devastated the Gulf Coast. Wisconsin reservists efforts did not go unnoticed. The Air Force Association named the 440th as its outstanding reserve unit in 1963, 1964, 1966 and 1968.

The 1970s began with a new unit being assigned to the 440th, the 928th Tactical Airlift Group in 1970. This was followed up with more up-to-date equipment. The wing's C-119s were replaced with Lockheed C-130A Hercules transport planes in 1971. In 1975, all C-130 tactical airlift wings, groups and squadrons in the active duty Air Force were transferred from TAC to the Military Airlift Command (MAC). As a result, all Air Force Reserve and Air National Guard C-130 airlift units also shifted to MAC as their operational gaining command.

Weather emergencies along the eastern U.S. coastline brought the 440th into action in February 1978. The wing flew more than 145 tons of equipment and supplies into several areas after severe blizzards brought life on the coast to a standstill.

The Air Force Reserve took on a new mission in 1979. In January of that year the 440th started a regular rotation with other reserve and National Guard units that took them to Panama to support the operations of United States Southern Command. Rotations to the Central American country lasted 2–3 weeks.

The low point of the 1980s occurred on 22 January 1985 when C-130A (AF Ser. No. 56-0501) commanded by Maj. Mike Durante crashed in the sea off the northern coast of Honduras while trying to land at Trujillo, Honduras. The plane carried a seven-man crew and 14 passengers. There were no survivors.

The highlight of the 1980s was the arrival of factory fresh C-130H Hercules aircraft. The local Reserve Officers Association, the 440th Community Council and numerous civic leaders led the efforts to convince Washington authorities to equip the 440th with eight new C-130s. The appropriation was approved and the aircraft were delivered in 1989. The C-130As the wing had been flying were apparently not just old, but unique. One of the 440th's C-130s was flown to Washington, D.C., and is now part of the Smithsonian's aircraft collection. The first C-130H was dubbed "The Spirit of Wisconsin."

The wing's continuing record of outstanding performance was recognized in 1987 with the award of the Air Force Outstanding Unit Award.

The 95th Squadron began the 1990s with honors when it was named best in the reserve with the award of the Grover Loening Trophy in 1990. Elements of the 440th were part of Operation Desert Shield in 1990 and Operation Desert Storm in 1991. Aircraft, flight crews, maintenance specialists and a variety of support specialists deployed to operating locations in several Persian Gulf states where they provided airlift support to U.S. and coalition military forces. The aircraft and personnel were drawn from the wing's units at Selfridge Air National Guard Base, Michigan, General Mitchell Air Reserve Station and O’Hare International Airport. The 927th Group performed the wing's first tactical resupply mission as part of Operation Desert Storm. The 440th Medical Squadron was activated in January 1991 and was deployed to Germany in anticipation of large numbers of casualties, which thankfully never occurred.

=== Post Cold War ===
As part of a post-Cold War reorganization, the Air Force inactivated SAC, TAC, and MAC, replacing them with the newly established Air Combat Command (ACC) and Air Mobility Command (AMC). In the first iteration of this new construct, active duty C-130 airlift units in the United States would come under ACC, with Air Force Reserve and Air National Guard C-130 airlift units similarly aligned for gaining command purposes. The 440th Airlift Wing was one of many Air Force Reserve and Air National Guard C-130 units that provided airlift support to NATO and U.S. operations in the Balkan region as part of Operation Provide Promise in 1993. The 440th swept almost all the C-130 honors at the 1993 Air Mobility Command Rodeo. The wing was recognized as the best of the best in the competition.

The next two years were a busy operational period for the wing. The 440th took part in Operation Uphold Democracy (Haiti) and Operation Safe Borders, support of U.S. Army forces in Honduras while preparing a defense of the unit before the congressionally mandated Base Realignment and Closure Commission).

Operation Joint Endeavor took elements of the unit back to the Balkans in 1995 and 1996. Wing aircrews flew people and supplies into and out of embattled Bosnia. The 11,005 sq ft (1,022.4 m^{2}) Aircraft Maintenance Shop (building 222) was also finished in 1996.

Tragedy came to the wing again in 1997 when a 440th C-130H (AF Ser. No. 88-4408) crashed while attempting to land at Tegucigalpa Airport in Honduras. Three members of the wing were killed in the accident. The post Cold War reorganization of the armed services brought still more change to the 440th when ACC transferred responsibility for all stateside, combat-coded, active duty C-130 airlift units to AMC, resulting in a realignment of all C-130 airlift units in the Air Force Reserve and Air National Guard, to include the ANG C-130 airlift wing in Puerto Rico, to AMC as their gaining command. As a result, the 440th became an Air Mobility Command gained unit on 1 April 1997.

Tragedies and operational changes did not dull the unit's sharp operational edge. The 440th went through an operation readiness inspection at the Savannah Ga., Combat Readiness Training Center, and received the highest score of any Reserve unit in the previous two years.

The wing went on to show off its real-world operational capabilities in 1999 when the 440th provided 13 percent of the total Reserve and Air National Guard tactical airlift that flew relief supplies into Kosovo as part of Operation Shining Hope. The wing Balkan efforts were complemented by continued support of the Coronet Oak mission throughout 1999 and 2000. Flying operations had been moved from Panama to Puerto Rico but the mission continued.

The 11 September 2001 terrorist attacks hurt the 440th as much as it did the rest of the country. The 440th Security Forces Squadron recalled almost the entire unit and was the first wing unit to deploy members on anti-terror operations. Security Forces Ravens were the first to deploy, but other members of the unit helped conduct prisoner transports from Afghanistan to Guantanamo Naval Station, Cuba after Taliban resistance collapsed in Afghanistan. Security specialists were also heavily involved in providing base and personal security measures and anti-terror measures in Afghanistan and Iraq.

On 26 November 2001, two days before Thanksgiving, the wing received a mobilization order for more than 300 aircrew members, aircraft maintenance specialists and general support specialists. By 15 December, the wing had six aircraft and about 200 people in Kuwait with more than a dozen operation missions accomplished by that date. The Flying Badgers are still on the job in the Central Command area providing airlift support, superb aircraft maintenance and security training and support from the Horn of Africa to the high desert of Afghanistan.

Since 2001, the 440th has deployed aircraft, crew, and support personnel in support of Operations Noble Eagle, Enduring Freedom and Iraqi Freedom.

The 2005 Base Realignment and Closure Commission decided that General Mitchell became General Mitchell Air National Guard Station, leaving the Wisconsin Air National Guard's 128th Air Refueling Wing and their Boeing KC-135 Stratotanker aircraft in place, and moving the 440th Airlift Wing and its C-130 aircraft to Pope Air Force Base, North Carolina. The wing started operations at Pope in 2006 and completed the move to Pope by October 2007. The first unit assembly at the new location was 1 October 2007. At the start of 2010, the 440th Airlift Wing has 16 C-130H models supporting worldwide missions and providing training missions for the XVIII Airborne Corps and 82nd Airborne Division from Fort Bragg.

BRAC made the 440th Airlift Wing the first active associate unit in Air Force history. The Regular Air Force's 2d Airlift Squadron and elements of the 43d Airlift Wing's maintenance units, that were also based at Pope, were receiving operational direction from the 440th while flying and helping maintain the 16 C-130H2 Hercules Air Force Reserve aircraft.

An article in the 6 March 2014 issue of the Fayetteville Observer noted that the Air Force has proposed the wing's inactivation and the retirement of its 12 C-130H aircraft. A follow-up article in the 11 March edition stated that state congressmen (Ellmers, Hudson, Price, and McIntyre) have spoken out against the proposed inactivation.

The last C-130 assigned to the 440th Airlift Wing departed on 29 June 2016, and the unit inactivated on 18 September 2016.

== Lineage ==
- Established as the 440th Troop Carrier Wing, Medium on 10 May 1949

Activated in the reserve on 27 June 1949
Ordered to active service on 1 May 1951
Inactivated on 4 May 1951

- Redesignated 440th Fighter-Bomber Wing on 26 May 1952

Activated in the reserve on 15 June 1952
Redesignated 440th Troop Carrier Wing, Medium on 8 September 1957
Ordered to active service on 28 October 1962
Relieved from active service on 28 November 1962
Redesignated: 440th Tactical Airlift Wing on 1 July 1967
Redesignated: 440th Airlift Wing on 1 February 1992
Inactivated on 18 September 2016

=== Assignments ===
- Tenth Air Force, 27 June 1949 – 4 May 1951
- Tenth Air Force, 15 June 1952
- Fifth Air Force Reserve Region, 1 September 1960
- Twelfth Air Force, 28 October 1962
- Fifth Air Force Reserve Region, 28 November 1962
- Central Air Force Reserve Region, 31 December 1969
- Fourth Air Force, 8 October 1976
- Tenth Air Force, 1 July 1994
- Twenty-Second Air Force, 1 April 1997 – 18 September 2016

=== Components ===
Groups

- 440th Troop Carrier Group (later 440th Fighter-Bomber Group, 440th Troop Carrier Group, 440th Operations Group), 27 June 1949 – 4 May 1951; 15 June 1952 – 14 April 1959; 1 August 1992 – 18 September 2016
- 910th Airlift Group: 1 August 1992 – 1 October 1994
- 914th Tactical Airlift Group: 1 September 1969 – 21 April 1971
- 927th Tactical Airlift Group (later 927th Airlift Group, 927th Air Refueling Group), 1 July 1981 – 1 August 1992.
- 928th Tactical Airlift Group: 17 September 1970 – 1 October 1994
- 933d Troop Carrier Group: 11 February 1963 – 1 September 1975
- 934th Troop Carrier Group: 11 February 1963 – 1 June April May 1978

Squadrons

- 95th Troop Carrier Squadron (later 95th Tactical Airlift Squadron): attached 16 November 1957 – 13 April 1959, assigned 14 April 1959 – 11 February 1963; assigned 1 September 1975 – 1 August 1992
- 96th Troop Carrier Squadron: 14 April 1959 – 11 February 1963

=== Stations ===
- Wold-Chamberlain Field (later Minneapolis-St Paul International Airport), Minnesota, 27 June 1949 – 4 May 1951
- Fort Snelling, Minnesota, 15 June 1952
- Minneapolis-Saint Paul International Airport, Minnesota, 15 August 1952
- General Mitchell Field (later General Mitchell International Airport, General Mitchell International Airport–Air Reserve Station, Wisconsin, 16 November 1957
- Pope Army Airfield, North Carolina, 10 June 2007 – 18 September 2016

=== Aircraft ===
- Curtiss C-46 Commando (1949–1951, 1952–1957)
- North American F-51 Mustang (1953–1954)
- Lockheed F-80 Shooting Star (1954–1957)
- Fairchild C-119 Flying Boxcar (1957–1971)
- Lockheed C-130 Hercules (1971–2016)
