= Le Mans Airfield =

Former airfield in France

Le Mans Airfield Advanced Landing Ground (ALG) A-35

- Pays de la Loire Region, France Le Mans Airfield (France)

Site information
- Type: Military airfield
- Controlled by: United States Army Air Forces

Location
- Coordinates: 48°00′27″N 000°11′54″E

Site history
- Built by: IX Engineering Command
- In use: September–November 1944
- Materials: Prefabricated Hessian Surfacing (PHS)
- Battles/wars: Western Front (World War II); Eastern France/Benelux Campaign

Le Mans Airfield refers to the World War II military airfield use of the modern day fr:Aéroport Le Mans-Arnage (LME LFRM, until Aérodrome des Raineries) which is located in the Arnage community to the south of the City of Le Mans in the Pays de la Loire region of northern France.

== History ==
In 1908, invited by local automobile manufacturer Léon Bollée, Wilbur Wright demonstrated his Flyer to the public at the Hippodrome to the south of the city. Since 1923, the 24 Hours of Le Mans endurance race takes place, with the paddock situated between the airfield and the hippodrome. In 1933, the airfield was made permanent.

The Renault manufacturing facilities (fr:Usine Renault ACI du Mans), opened nearby in 1920, became an industrial target for the Allies in the early 1940s during the Occupation of France by the Germans. The Renault plant was the largest armament, truck and tank works in France.

=== German use during World War II ===
The Luftwaffe used the grass airfield since 7 September 1940 for the defense of the facility. Known units assigned (all from Luftlotte 3, Fliegerkorps IV):

- Zerstörergeschwader 76 (ZG 76) May–June 1940 Messerschmitt Bf 110
- Jagdgeschwader 3 (JG 3) 20–23 June 1940 Messerschmitt Bf 109E
- Lehrgeschwader 1 (LG 1) 28–29 June 1940 Messerschmitt Bf 110C/D
- Jagdgeschwader 54 (JS 54) 15 January-29 March 1941 Messerschmitt Bf 109E
- Jagdgeschwader 1 (JG 1) 7–12 June 1944 Focke-Wulf Fw 190A
- Jagdgeschwader 53 (JG 53) 6 June-6 July 1944 Messerschmitt Bf 109G

The Luftwaffe assigned a series of units, rotating them in and out of Le Mans to provide air defense against Allied bombing attacks on the Renault works, which was attacked on several occasions by United States Army Air Force Eighth Air Force heavy bomb groups during 1943 and 1944.

=== American use ===
The Luftwaffe airfield was seized by Allied ground forces about 12 August 1944 during the Northern France Campaign. Almost immediately, the USAAF IX Engineer Command 816th Engineer Aviation Battalion began clearing the base of mines and destroyed Luftwaffe aircraft and repairing operational facilities for use by American aircraft. The engineers laid down a single 5000' (1500m) all-weather Prefabricated Hessian Surfacing/Compressed Earth runway (3600 PHS/1400 ETH) aligned 14/32. In addition, tents were used for billeting and also for support facilities. An access road was built to the existing road infrastructure, and a dump for supplies, ammunition, and gasoline drums, along with a drinkable water and minimal electrical grid for communications and station lighting. Once refurbished, it was known as Advanced Landing Ground "A-35".

The 36th Fighter Group, based P-47 Thunderbolt fighters at Le Mans from 25 August though late September 1944. The 36th was replaced by the 440th Troop Carrier Group, which flew C-47 Skytrains from the airfield from 30 September until 2 November 1944

The fighter planes flew support missions during the Allied invasion of Normandy, patrolling roads in front of the beachhead; strafing German military vehicles and dropping bombs on gun emplacements, anti-aircraft artillery and concentrations of German troops in Normandy and Brittany when spotted. The C-47s participated in Operation Market-Garden, the airborne invasion of the Netherlands, carrying troops of the 82d Airborne Division to a drop site near Groesbeek on 17 September 1944. The following day, the 440th towed CG-4A Waco gliders to the same general location with reinforcements and supplies. Another glider towing resupply and reinforcement mission was flown to Overasselt, the Netherlands on 23 September.

After the Americans moved east into Central France with the advancing Allied Armies, the airfield was closed on 30 November 1944. Today the long dismantled airfield is indistinguishable from the agricultural fields in the area.

Note: The modern airport runway at Le Mans today, Le Mans-Arnage airport, is not directly related to the short USAAF use in 1944.

== See also ==
- Advanced Landing Ground
