= 1943 New Year Honours =

British royal recognitions

The 1943 New Year Honours were appointments by King George VI to various orders and honours to reward and highlight good works by citizens of the United Kingdom and British Empire. They were announced on 29 December 1942.

The recipients of honours are displayed here as they were styled before their new honour.

== United Kingdom and British Empire ==
=== Baron ===
- Admiral of the Fleet Sir Roger John Brownlow Keyes, Bt., G.C.B., K.C.V.O., C.M.G., D.S.O.
- The Right Honourable Sir Miles Wedderburn Lampson, G.C.M.G., C.B., M.V.O., H.M. Ambassador Extraordinary and Plenipotentiary at Cairo and High Commissioner for the Sudan.
- Sir Charles McMoran Wilson, M.C., M.D., President of the Royal College of Physicians.

=== Privy Counsellor ===
- Richard Kidston Law, Esq, M.P., Parliamentary Under-Secretary of State, Foreign Office; Member of Parliament for South-West Hull since 1931.
- Osbert Peake, Esq., M.P., Parliamentary Under-Secretary of State, Home Office. Member of Parliament for North Leeds since 1929.
- William Whiteley, Esq., M.P., Joint Parliamentary Secretary, H.M. Treasury. Member of Parliament for the Blaydon Division of Durham, 1922-1931, and since 1935.

=== Baronet ===
- Arthur Malcolm Trustram Eve, Esq., M.C., T.D., K.C., Chairman, War Damage Commission. (Colonel, T.A.).
- William Macnamara Goodenough, Esq., J.P., D.L., Chairman, Nuffield Trust for the University Medical School, Oxford.

=== Knight Bachelor ===
- Thomas Baxter, Esq., Chairman of the Milk Marketing Board for England and Wales.
- Gerald Francis Carter, O.B.E., Principal Assistant Solicitor, Office of H.M. Procurator General and Treasury Solicitor.
- Professor John Harold Clapham, C.B.E., Litt.D., F.B.A., Vice-Provost of King's College, Cambridge, President of the British Academy.
- Fred Clarke, M.A., Litt.D., Professor of Education, University of London.
- Walter Palmer Cobbett, C.B.E. For public services in Manchester.
- Major Jack Benn Brunel Cohen, Honorary Treasurer of the British Legion.
- Alderman John Edward Daw, J.P., Chairman of the Devon County Council. For services to Civil Defence.
- Alexander Dunbar, Controller General, Ministry of Aircraft Production.
- Alfred Charles Glyn Egerton, F.R.S., Professor of Chemical Technology, Imperial College of Science and Technology. Joint Secretary of the Royal Society.
- Frank Minshull Elgood, C.B.E., F.R.I.B.A., Chairman of the Executive Board and Honorary Treasurer of the Church Army.
- Clifford Henry Figg, Business Adviser to the Secretary of State for the Colonies.
- Archibald Finlayson Forbes, Deputy Secretary, Ministry of Aircraft Production.
- William Kenrick Gibbons, C.B., Principal Clerk, Public Bill Office, and Clerk of the Fees, House of Commons.
- Edwin Savory Herbert, Director, Postal and Telegraph Censorship Department, Ministry of Information.
- Summers Hunter, Managing Director of the North-Eastern Marine Engineering Company (1938) Limited. Regional Director (Merchant Shipbuilding and Repairs), North-East of England.
- Alderman George Kenning, J.P. For public services in Derbyshire.
- Lieutenant-Colonel Hoël Llewellyn, D.S.O., D.L., Chief Constable of Wiltshire.
- Professor Stanley Robert Marchant, C.V.O., D.Mus., F.R.A.M., F.R.C.M., F.R.C.O., Principal of the Royal Academy of Music.
- Ralph Ismay Metcalfe, Esq., Director, Tanker Division, Ministry of War Transport.
- William Murray Morrison, Esq., M.Inst.C.E., M.I.E.E., Vice-Chairman and Managing Director, British Aluminium Company Limited.
- George Horatio Nelson, Esq., M.I.E.E., M.I.Mech.E., Chairman and Managing Director, English Electric Company Limited. For services to the Ministry of Aircraft Production and to the Ministry of Supply.
- Frank Nicholson, C.B.E., D.L., Chairman of Sunderland Local Employment Committee.
- Cecil Oakes, C.B.E., Clerk of the East Suffolk County Council.
- Captain Arthur Lewis Owens, R.D., R.N.R. (Retd.), Master, Merchant Navy.
- Frank Platt, Esq., Cotton Controller, Ministry of Supply.
- Lieutenant-Colonel John Murray Reddie, C.B., J.P., D.L., Secretary, Council of County Territorial Associations. Vice-Chairman and Secretary of the Council of Voluntary War Work.
- Henry Ridpath, General Trade Adviser, Ministry of Food.
- Frederick James Sparks, Town Clerk and Air Raid Precautions Controller, Portsmouth.
- William Arthur Stanier, M.I.Mech.E., Chief Mechanical Engineer, London, Midland and Scottish Railway Company.
- Arthur Stiebel, Chief Registrar in Bankruptcy, High Court of Justice.
- William Miles Webster Thomas, D.F.C., Vice-Chairman, Morris Motors Limited.
- Captain Thomas Watt, J.P., D.L., lately Convener of Lanark County Council.
- Arthur Benedict Winder, J.P., Director and General Manager, the English Steel Corporation Limited.
- Johnstone Wright, M.Inst.C.E., M.I.E.E., Chief Engineer, Central Electricity Board.

Dominions

- The Honourable John Demetrius Morris, Chief Justice of Tasmania.
- The Honourable John Mellis Napier, Lieutenant-Governor and Chief Justice of the State of South Australia.

India

- Diwan Bahadur Samuel Ebenezer Ranganathan, Adviser to the Secretary of State for India.
- The Honourable Mr Justice Dalip Singh, Puisne Judge of the High Court of Judicature at Lahore, Punjab.
- The Honourable Mr Justice George Douglas McNair, M.B.E., Puisne Judge of the High Court of Judicature at Fort William in Bengal.
- The Honourable Mr Justice Vere Mockett, Barrister-at-Law, M.B.E., Puisne Judge of the High Court of Judicature at Fort St George, Madras.
- John Francis Sheehy, C.S.I., Indian Civil Service, Senior Member, Central Board of Revenue, and Additional Secretary to the Government of India in the Finance Department.
- Rustom Pestonji Masani, J.P., Provincial Leader, National War Front, Bombay and lately Vice-Chancellor, University of Bombay.
- Robert Ecklin Marriott, General Manager, East Indian Railway, Calcutta.
- Arthur Cecil Griffin, O.B.E., General Manager, North-Western Railway, Lahore.
- Gerald Snowdon Butler, C.I.E., Deputy Director-General (Armaments Production), Directorate-General, Munitions Production, Department of Supply, Government of India.
- James Rennie Izat, V.D., Agent and General Manager, Bengal and North-Western Railway and Rohilkhand and Kumaon Railway, Gorakhpur, United Provinces.
- Archibald Douglas Gordon, C.I.E., Indian Police, Civil Security Adviser to General Officer Commanding-in-Chief, Eastern Army, and lately Inspector-General of Police, Bengal.
- Stanley Herbert Howard, Indian Forest Service, Inspector-General of Forests and President, Forest Research. Institute, Dehra Dun.
- Brigadier Edward Oliver Wheeler, M.C., R.E., Surveyor-General of India.
- Maharaj Shri Ajit Singhji, Councillor to His Highness the Maharaja of Jodhpur, Rajputana.
- Jnanendra Chandra Ghosh, D.Sc., Director, Indian Institute of Science, Bangalore.
- Gerald Hassall Hodgson, Member of the Legislative, Council, Managing Director, Messrs Parry & Company Limited, Madras.
- Francis Low, Editor, Times of India, Bombay.
- Lala Padampat Singhania, Industrialist, Cawnpore, United Provinces.

Burma

- The Honourable Mr Justice Herbert Francis Dunkley, Barrister-at-Law, Judge, High Court of Judicature and Legal Adviser to the Governor of Burma.
- U Htoon Aung Gyaw, Barrister-at-Law, Minister of Finance to the Governor of Burma.

Colonies, Protectorates, etc.

- Ernest Allan Collymore, Colonial Legal Service, Chief Justice of Barbados.
- Justin Louis Devaux, Colonial Legal Service, Chief Judge, Mauritius.
- Ratnajoti Saravanamuttu, M.B., C.M., M.R.C.S., L.R.C.P. For public services in Ceylon.
- John Verity, Colonial Legal Service, Chief Justice of British Guiana.

=== Order of the Bath ===
==== Knight Commander of the Order of the Bath (KCB) ====
- Vice-Admiral Lionel Victor Wells, C.B., D.S.O.
- Vice-Admiral William Eric Campbell Tait, C.B., M.V.O.
- Vice-Admiral William Frederic Wake-Walker, C.B., C.B.E.
- Vice-Admiral Stuart Sumner Bonham-Carter, C.B., C.V.O., D.S.O.
- Lieutenant-General Harold Edmund Franklyn, C.B., D.S.O., M.C., Colonel, The Green Howards (Alexandra, Princess of Wales's Own Yorkshire Regiment).
- Lieutenant-General Thomas Ralph Eastwood, C.B., D.S.O., M.C., late The Rifle Brigade (Prince Consort's Own).
- Lieutenant-General Sir George Norton Cory, K.B.E., C.B., D.S.O., late The Royal Dublin Fusiliers.
- Colonel (Honorary Brigadier-General) Sir Edward Thomas Le Marchant, Bt., C.B., C.B.E., D.L., Chairman, Territorial Army and Air Force Association of the County of Nottingham.
- Air Marshal Philip Babington, C.B., M.C., A.F.C.
- Air Marshal Douglas Claude Strathern Evill, C.B., D.S.C., A.F.C.
- Air Marshal Trafford Leigh Leigh-Mallory, C.B., D.S.O.
- Sir (William) Wilson Jameson, M.D., LL.D., F.R.C.P., D.P.H., Chief Medical Officer of the. Ministry of Health and Board of Education.
- Sir Eric Gustav Machtig, K.C.M.G., O.B.E., Permanent Under-Secretary of State, Dominions Office.
- Sir Arnold Edersheim Overton, K.G.M.G., M.C., Permanent Secretary, Board of Trade.

==== Companion of the Order of the Bath (CB) ====
Military Division

- Rear-Admiral Charles Edward Barrington Simeon.
- Rear-Admiral Frank Henderson Pegram, D.S.O.
- Rear-Admiral Louis Henry Keppel Hamilton, D.S.O.
- Acting Rear-Admiral George Hector Creswell, D.S.O., D.S.C.
- Engineer Rear-Admiral Gerald George Percy Burt.
- Paymaster Rear-Admiral William Evelyn Hatten Jolly.
- Colonel Second Commandant (Brevet Colonel) (Acting Major General) Robin Hasluck Campbell, M.C.
- Lieutenaht-General Sir Noel Monson de la Poer Beresford-Peirse, K.B.E., D.S.O., late Royal Artillery.
- Major-General Robert Cotton Money, M.C., late The Cameronians (Scottish Rifles).
- Major-General Eric Grant Miles, D.S.O., M.C., late The King's Own Scottish Borderers.
- Major-General Charles John Stuart King, C.B.E., late Royal Engineers.
- Major-General John Alexander Manifold, D.S.O., M.B., K.H.P., late Royal Army Medical Corps.
- Major-General Reginald Henry Lorie, C.B.E., late The Royal Ulster Rifles.
- Major-General Ian Stanley Ord Playfair, D.S.O., M.C., late Royal Engineers.
- Major-General John Ledlie Inglis Hawkesworth, C.B.E., late The East Yorkshire Regiment (The Duke of York's Own).
- Major-General John Edward Utterson-Kelso, D.S.O., O.B.E., M.C., late The Royal Scots Fusiliers.
- Major-General Leslie Hamlyn Williams, M.C., late Royal Army Ordnance Corps.
- Major-General (acting Lieutenant-General) Alexander Frank Philip Christison, M.C., late The Queen's Own Cameron Highlanders.
- Major-General Harry Willans, C.B.E., D.S.O., M.C., T.D., Territorial Army.
- Colonel (temporary Major-General) Leslie Gordon Phillips, C.B.E., M.C., late Royal Corps of Signals.
- Colonel (temporary Major-General) Frederick Arthur Montague Browning, D.S.O., late Grenadier Guards.
- Colonel (temporary Major-General) Robert Frederick Edward Whittaker, O.B.E., T.D., late Royal Artillery.
- Major-General George Ledsam Seymour Hawkins, M.C., Indian Army.
- Major-General Charles Reginald Cambridge Lane, M.C., Indian Army.
- Major-General Gerald Michael Fitzgerald, M.C., Indian Army.
- Colonel (temporary Brigadier) Frederick Cromie de Butts, D.S.O., M.C., Indian Army.
- Lieutenant-General Vernon Ashton Hobart Sturdee, C.B.E., D.S.O., Australian Military Forces.
- Air Vice-Marshal Hugh Vivian Champion de Crespigny, M.C., D.F.C.
- Air Vice-Marshal the Hon. Ralph Alexander Cochrane, C.B.E., A.F.C.
- Air Vice-Marshal Ronald Graham, C.B.E., D.S.O., D.S.C., D.F.C.
- Air Vice-Marshal Alfred Samuel Morris, O.B.E.
- Air Vice-Marshal George Clark Pirie, C.B.E., M.C., D.F.C.
- Air Vice-Marshal Robert Peel Willock.
- Acting Air Vice-Marshal Geoffrey Rhodes Bromet, C.B.E., D.S.O.
- Acting Air Vice-Marshal Arthur John Capel, D.S.O., D.F.C.
- Acting Air Vice-Marshal Matthew Brown Frew, D.S.O., M.C., D.F.C.
- Acting Air Vice-Marshal Douglas Harries, A.F.C.
- Air Commodore John Walter Cordingley, C.B.E.
- Air Commodore John Charles Quinnell, D.F.C.

Civil Division

- Honorary Colonel Edward Hoblyn Warren Bolitho, D.S.O., President, Territorial Army Association of the County of Cornwall.
- Honorary Colonel Francis John Carruthers, President, Territorial Army Association of the County of Dumfries.
- Brevet-Colonel Henry Morris Pryce-Jones, D.S.O., M.V.O., M.C., D.L., Secretary, Territorial Army and Air Force Association of the County of London.
- Air Commodore Alfred Drummond Warrington-Morris, C.M.G., O.B.E. (Retd.), Commandant of the Royal Observer Corps from 1 March 1936, to 24 June 1942.
- Cyril Augustine Birtchnell, Esq., Principal Assistant Secretary, Ministry of War Transport.
- Richard Basil Cross, Esq., O.B.E., Principal Assistant Secretary, Ministry of Health.
- George Henry Henderson, Esq., Deputy Secretary, Department of Health for Scotland.
- Herbert John Hutchinson, Esq., C.B.E., Under-Secretary, Raw Materials Department, Ministry of Supply.
- Henry Dashwood Stucley Leake, Esq., Chief Charity Commissioner.
- Harold Parker, Esq., M.C., Deputy Secretary, Ministry of Pensions.
- Louis George Stanley Reynolds, Esq., C.B.E., Assistant Under-Secretary of State, Air Ministry.
- William George Stevens, Esq., Principal Assistant Secretary, Ministry of Aircraft Production.
- Edward Stephen Wood, Esq., Director of Stores, Admiralty. ,
- John Harold Edmund Woods, Esq., M.V.O., Principal Assistant Secretary, H.M. Treasury.

=== Order of Merit (OM) ===
- Sir William Searle Holdsworth, K.C., M.A., D.C.L.

=== Order of the Star of India ===
==== Knight Commander of the Order of the Star of India (KCSI) ====
- Sir Thomas Guthrie Russell, K.C.I.E., Director-General, Munitions Production, Department of Supply, Government of India.
- Lieutenant-General Cyril Dupre Noyes, C.B., C.I.E., M.C., Indian Army, General Officer Commanding-in-Chief, North-Western Army.

==== Companion of the Order of the Star of India (CSI) ====
- Major-General Heeraji Jehangir Manookjee Cursetjee, D.S.O., K.H.S., Indian Medical Service, Deputy Director of Medical Services, Headquarters, North-Western Army.
- James Birch Brown, Esq., C.I.E., Indian Civil Service, Member, Board of Revenue, Madras.
- Lieutenant-Colonel Clive Kirkpatrick Daly, C.I.E., Indian Political Service, Resident for Baroda and the Gujarat States.
- Lieutenant-Colonel William Rupert Hay, C.I.E., Indian Political Service, Revenue and Judicial Commissioner, Baluchistan, and lately Officiating Political Resident in the Persian Gulf.
- Anthony St George Lyster, Esq., Indian Service of Engineers, Chief Engineer and Secretary to the Government of-the Punjab in the Public Works Department, Irrigation Branch.
- Arthur Allen Waugh, Esq., C.I.E., Indian Civil Service, War Production Commissioner and Secretary to the Government of the United Provinces in the Industries and Excise Departments.

=== Order of St Michael and St George ===
==== Knight Grand Cross of the Order of St Michael and St George (GCMG) ====
- Sir Wilfrid Edward Francis Jackson, K.C.M.G., Governor and Commander-in-Chief, Tanganyika Territory.
- Sir Kinahan Cornwallis, K.G.M.G., C.B.E., D.S.O., His Majesty's Ambassador Extraordinary and Plenipotentiary at Bagdad.

==== Knight Commander of the Order of St Michael and St George (KCMG) ====
- Robert Hamilton Bruce Lockhart, Esq., Director-General, Political Warfare Executive.
- Colonel (local Brigadier) Stewart Graham Menzies, C.B., D.S.O., M.C., late The Life Guards. For official services.
- Sigismund David Waley, Esq., C.B., M.C., Under Secretary, H.M. Treasury.
- John Humphrey Wise, Esq., C.B.E., Indian Civil Service, Counsellor to the Governor of Burma.
- Sir Edward St John Jackson, K.B.E., lately Lieutenant-Governor, Malta.
- Charles Joseph Jeffries, Esq., C.M.G., O.B.E., an Assistant Under Secretary of State, Colonial Office.
- Charles Campbell Woolley, Esq., C.M.G., O.B.E., M.C., Governor and Commander-in-Chief, Cyprus.
- Godfrey Digby Napier Haggard, Esq., C.M.G., O.B.E., His Majesty's Consul-General at New York.
- George William Rendel, Esq., C.M.G., His Majesty's Ambassador Extraordinary and Plenipotentiary to the Yugoslav Government in London.

==== Companion of the Order of St Michael and St George (CMG) ====
- William Boyd, Esq., C.B.E., Deputy Representative of the Ministry of War Transport in the United States of America.
- The Honourable Thomas Henry Brand, Chief Executive Officer on the British side of the Combined Production and Resources Board in Washington.
- Henry Albert Jones, Esq., M.C., Senior Administrative Officer, United Kingdom Air Liaison Mission, Ottawa.
- John Ashwell Stirling, Esq., O.B.E., Assistant Secretary, Board of Trade. Representative of the Department in Washington.
- Colonel Frank Charles George Twinn, lately Director of Postal Services (now Regional Director, South Western Region), General Post Office.
- Richard Gordon Bathgate Prescott, Esq., O.B.E., Officiating Inspector-General of Police, Burma.
- Peter Alexander Clutterbuck, Esq., M.C., Acting Assistant Under Secretary of State, Dominions Office.
- The Honourable Thomas Murdoch, President of the Legislative Council, State of Tasmania.
- The Honourable Robert Clarkson Tredgold, K.C., Minister of Justice and Defence, Southern Rhodesia.
- Donald Yates, Esq., M.C., a leading metallurgist in the State of South Australia.
- John Vionee Alexander, Esq., Chairman of Aden Settlement and Chairman of Aden Port Trust.
- Commander John Hinton Carrow, D.S.C., R.N. (Retd.), Colonial Administrative Service, Senior Resident, Nigeria.
- Gerald Hallen Creasy, Esq., O.B.E., an Assistant Secretary, Colonial Office.
- Robert Edward Harold Crosbie, Esq., O.B.E., Colonial Administrative Service, District Commissioner, Palestine.
- Edward Trevor Dyson, Esq., Colonial Administrative Service, Officer of Class I, Grade I, Ceylon Civil Service.
- Stanley Alfred Andrew Hammond, Esq., Educational Adviser to the Comptroller for Development and Welfare in the West Indies.
- John Edward Stewart Lamb, Esq., Colonial Administrative Service, Provincial Commissioner, Tanganyika Territory.
- Edgar Laurent, Esq., M.D. For public services in Mauritius.
- John Walker Macgillivray, Esq., O.B.E., Colonial Survey Service, lately Director of Surveys and Sub-Intendant of Crown Lands, Trinidad.
- Paymaster Lieutenant George Beresford Stooke, R.N. (Retd.), Colonial Administrative Service, Chief Secretary, Northern Rhodesia.
- Hugh Fortescue Moresby White, Esq., Colonial Administrative Service, Senior Resident, Nigeria.
- Mustafa Fuad Ziai Bey, Colonial Legal Service, Puisne Judge, Gold Coast.
- William John Davies, Esq., O.B.E., formerly His Majesty's Consul-General at Kobe.
- William Alfred Milner Doll, Esq., formerly Adviser to the Siamese Ministry of Finance.
- Hugh Alexander Ford, Esq., His Majesty's Consul-General at Boston.
- Captain Alan Hillgarth, O.B.E., R.N. (retired), Naval Attaché at His Majesty's Embassy at Madrid.
- Alfred Dilwyn Knox, Esq. For services to the Foreign Office.
- John Helier Le Rougetel, Esq., M.C., Counsellor in His Majesty's Diplomatic Service.
- Edgar William Light, Esq., M.V.O., O.B.E., Assistant in the Treaty Department, Foreign Office.
- Terence Allen Shone, Esq., Minister Plenipotentiary at His Majesty's Embassy at Cairo.
- Brigadier George Thexton Wards, O.B.E., until recently Military Attaché at His Majesty's Embassy at Tokyo.

Honorary CMG

- Adesoji Aderemi, The Oni of Ife, Nigeria.

=== Order of the Indian Empire ===
==== Knight Grand Cross of the Order of the Indian Empire (GCIE) ====
- Sir Maurice Garnier Hallett, K.C.S.I, C.I.E., Governor of the United Provinces.

==== Knight Commander of the Order of the Indian Empire (KCIE) ====
- Maharana Shri Jorawarsinhji Pratapsinjhi, Raja of Sant.
- Lieutenant-General Clarence August Bird, C.B., D.S.O., British Service, Master-General of the Ordnance in India.
- Sir Bijoy Prasad Singh Roy, Bengal.

==== Companion of the Order of the Indian Empire (CIE) ====
- Malcolm Ogilvie Carter, Esq., M.C., Indian Civil Service, Civil Liaison Officer, Eastern Army, and lately Secretary to the Governor of Bengal.
- Santdas Khushiram Kirpalani, Esq., Indian Civil Service, Joint Secretary to the Government of India in the Department of Supply.
- Colonel (Acting Major-General) Douglas Stuart, O.B.E., Indian Army, lately Brigadier, General Staff, Eastern Army.
- Archibald Corrie Macnabb MacLeod, Esq., Indian Civil Service, Commissioner, Jullundur Division, Punjab.
- Pendyala Satyanarayana Rau, Esq., Indian Civil Service, Commissioner (Officiating), Nagpur Division, Central Provinces and Berar.
- Colonel (Temporary Brigadier) William Horatio Happell, Indian Army, Judge Advocate-General in India.
- Lieutenant-Colonel Edward Cotter, M.B., B.Ch., D.P.H., Indian Medical Service, Public Health Commissioner with the Government of India.
- Colonel (Temporary Brigadier) Edward McGuinness, Royal Army Ordnance Corps, Director of Mechanization, Master-General of the Ordnance Branch, General Headquarters, India.
- Eric Ingoldby, Esq., Chief Controller of Standardisation, Railway Board, Government of India.
- Colonel (Temporary Brigadier) James Dunbar MacKenzie, Indian Army, Commander, Quetta Area.
- Commodore Arthur Rullion Rattray, Royal Indian Navy.
- Joseph Maurice Sladen, Esq., J.P., Indian Civil Service, Secretary to the Government of Bombay in the Home Department.
- John Augustus Samuel, Esq., Barrister-at-Law, Secretary to the Government of Bihar in the Legislative Department.
- Reginald Trevor Jones, Esq., M.C., Indian Service of Engineers, Chief Engineer and Secretary to the Government of the Punjab in the Public Works Department, Buildings and Roads Branch.
- Ernest Clement Wood, Esq., Indian Civil Service, Secretary to the Government of Madras in the Education and Public Health Department.
- Arthur Finch Perrott, Esq., Indian Police, Inspector-General of Police, North-West Frontier Province.
- Richard Percyvale Ward, Esq., M.C., D.F.C., Indian Civil Service, Civil Liaison Officer for Orissa at Eastern Army Headquarters.
- Percival Vincent Chance, Esq., Indian Service of Engineers, Chief Engineer, Central Provinces and Berar.
- John Herbert Thomas, Esq., F.I.A., Superintendent of Insurance with the Government of India.
- Sorab Nanabhoy Moos, Esq., Indian Educational Service, Director of Public Instruction, Bombay.
- Frederic William Kidd, Esq., Indian Police, Deputy Director, Intelligence Bureau, Home Department, Government of India.
- Chikballapur Venkata Srinivasa Rao, Esq., Indian Audit and Accounts Service, Director of Audit, Defence Services, India.
- Percy James Edmunds, Esq., Chief Engineer, Posts and Telegraphs, Government of India.
- Arthur Mitford Sims, Esq., Chief Engineer, North-Western Railway, Lahore.
- Rao Bahadur Bhagavathulu Viswanath, Officiating Director, Imperial Agricultural Research Institute, New Delhi.
- Colonel Kendal Ferguson Franks, D.S.O., Indian Army (retired), Assistant Director of Recruiting, Southern Area.
- Colonel Reginald Hugh Penrose-Welstead, Indian Army (retired), lately Director of Farms, General Headquarters, India.
- Thomas Blandford Jameson, Esq., M.C., Indian Civil Service, Magistrate and Collector, Chittagong, Bengal.
- Christopher Gimson, Esq., Indian Civil Service, Political Agent in Manipur, Assam.
- Eric de Vere Moss, Esq., Indian Civil Service, Magistrate and Collector, Gorakhpur, United Provinces.
- Krishna Prasada, Esq., J.P., Indian Civil Service, Postmaster-General, Bengal and Assam Circle, Calcutta.
- Nagendra Bhusan Baksi, Esq., Indian Civil Service, Magistrate and Collector, Monghyr, Bihar.
- Major Arthur John Dring, Indian Political Service, Political Agent, South Waziristan, North-West Frontier Province.
- Hugh Tufnell-Barrett, Esq., Indian Civil Service, Deputy Secretary to the Government of India in the Department of Labour.
- Kumar Padma Sivasankara Menon, Esq., Indian Political Service, Dewan of Bharatpur State, Rajputana.
- Lieutenant-Colonel Geoffrey Edleston Wheeler, Indian Army, Publicity Officer (Foreign), Government of India.
- Robert Anderson MacGregor, Esq., Chief Metallurgist, Department of Supply, Calcutta.
- Herbert James Thom, Esq., M.C., Indian Police, Assistant Inspector-General of Police, Criminal Investigation Department, United Provinces.
- James Taylor Alexander, Esq., Secretary and Treasurer, Imperial Bank of India, Madras.
- Geoffrey Steele Henderson, Esq., Landholder, Thar Parkar District, Sind.
- Alec Houghton Joyce, Esq., O.B.E., Adviser on Publicity Questions, India Office.
- Nyapathi Madhava Rau, Esq., Dewan and ex-officio President of the Council, Mysore State.

=== Royal Victorian Order ===
==== Knight Commander of the Royal Victorian Order (KCVO) ====
- Walter Rangeley Maitland Lamb, C.V.O., classical lecturer, author and translator

==== Commander of the Royal Victorian Order (CVO) ====
- Lieutenant-Colonel Humphrey Butler, M.V.O., M.C.
- The Reverend Arthur Rose Fuller, M.V.O., M.A.
- Colonel Dermot McMorrough Kavanagh.
- Major Louis William Howard Kerr, C.M.G., M.V.O., O.B.E.
- Charles Sculthorpe Morris, Esq., M.R.C.S., L.R.C.P., L.D.S.
- Edgar Stanley Roper, Esq., M.V.O.
- Henry Austin Strutt, Esq., M.V.O.

==== Member of the Royal Victorian Order (MVO) ====
- David Ovens Drummond, Esq., J.P.
- Ronald Montague Joseph Harris, Esq.
- Captain James John William Herbertson, O.B.E.
- John Robert Kennedy, Esq., M.B., C.M.
- Superintendent Hugh Joseph Ross Cameron, Metropolitan Police.
- Reginald Norman Tyrrell, Esq.

=== Order of the British Empire ===
==== Knight Grand Cross of the Order of the British Empire (GBE) ====
- Lieutenant-General Sir William Platt, K.C.B., D.S.O., Colonel, The Wiltshire Regiment (Duke of Edinburgh's).
- Air Chief Marshal Sir Edgar Rainey Ludlow-Hewitt, K.C.B., C.M.G., D.S.O., M.C.
- Sir Henry Hallett Dale, C.B.E., M.D., D.Sc., F.R.C.P., lately Director of the National Institute for Medical Research. President of the Royal Society.
- Colonel Sir (William) Charles Wright, Bt., K.B.E., C.B., lately Controller of Iron and Steel, Ministry of Supply.
- Major His Highness Mir Himayat Ali Khan, Walashan Nawab Azam Jah Bahadur, Prince of Berar.

==== Dame Commander of the Order of the British Empire (DBE) ====
- Miss Lilian Braithwaite. For services to the stage.

==== Knight Commander of the Order of the British Empire (KBE) ====
- Admiral Arthur John Davies, C.B. (Retired).
- Vice-Admiral Malcolm Lennon Goldsmith, D.S.O. (Retired).
- Vice-Admiral James Andrew Gardiner Troup, C.B. (Retired).
- Lieutenant-General Desmond Francis Anderson, C.B., C.M.G., D.S.O., Colonel, The East Yorkshire Regiment (The Duke of York's Own).
- Honorary Major-General Henry Letheby Tidy, F.R.C.P., late Royal Army Medical Corps.
- Acting Air Marshal John Eustace Arthur Baldwin, C.B., C.B.E., D.S.O.
- Sir Amos Lowrey Ayre, O.B.E., Director of Merchant Shipbuilding, Admiralty.
- William Leitch, Esq., C.B., Deputy Secretary, Ministry of Works and Planning.
- Frank Aubrey Newsam, Esq., C.V.O., M.C., Deputy Under Secretary of State, Home Office.
- Eric Bourne Bentinck Speed, Esq., M.C., Joint Permanent Under Secretary of State, War Office.
- Sir Frederick Joseph West, C.B.E., M.Inst.C.E., M.I.Mech.E., J.P., Chairman, North Western Training Committee, Ministry of Labour and National Service.
- Clifford Edward Heathcote-Smith, Esq., C.M.G., C.B.E., His Majesty's Consul-General at Alexandria.
- The Honourable Sir Alexander Fraser Russell, Chief Justice of Southern Rhodesia.
- Arthur Atkinson Bruce, Esq., M.C., General Manager, Bombay Burmah Trading Corporation Ltd., Burma.
- Allan Wolsey Cardinall, Esq., C.M.G., Governor and Commander-in-Chief of the Falkland Islands and its Dependencies.

==== Member of Order of the British Empire (MBE) ====
- Robert Adam, Esq., Air Raid Precautions Controller and Town Clerk of Perth.
- Walter William Andrew, Esq., D.C.M., Senior Regional Officer, Ministry of Health.
- Captain Harold Corbin Archer, Master, Merchant Navy.
- Thomas Atkinson, Esq., Harbour Master, Mersey Docks and Harbour Board.
- Donald Coleman Bailey, Esq., Assistant Superintendent and Chief Designer, Experimental Bridging Establishment, Ministry of Supply.
- William Bain, Esq., Chief Engineer Officer, Merchant Navy.
- James Barbour, Esq., J.P., formerly President of the National Union of Scottish Mine Workers.
- Harold Noel Wykeham Barnes, Esq., Chief Engineer Officer, Merchant Navy.
- Charles John Copeland Bate, Esq., Honorary Secretary, Incorporated Soldiers', Sailors' and Airmen's Help Society, Southampton.
- William Henry Bateman, Esq., Vice-Chairman, Coventry Reconstruction Panel, Emergency Services Organisation.
- Robert Talbot MacCarthy Beamish, Esq., lately Chief Civil Assistant to the Chief Inspector of Naval Ordnance.
- Captain Jeffrey James Bedford, Master, Merchant Navy.
- Charles Eric Boast, Esq., M.C., M.Inst.C.E., F.S.I., Borough Engineer, Croydon. For services to Civil Defence.
- Leonard George Bolton, Esq., M.C., Electrical Engineering Manager, H.M. Dockyard, Malta, Now employed in the Admiralty.
- Sidney Joseph George Booth, Esq., Works Manager, Rootes Securities, Ltd. For services to the Ministry of Aircraft Production.
- Walter Keith Borrett, Esq., Naval Store Officer, H.M. Dockyard, Malta, Now Naval Store Officer, West Riding of Yorkshire.
- Captain Henry Brierley, M.C., House Governor of the London Hospital. For services to Civil Defence:
- William Brown, Esq., Chief Engineer Officer, Merchant Navy.
- Alderman Ralph Sydney Butterfield, M.C., Chairman of the Emergency Committee, North Riding County Council.
- Captain Frederick Caffyn, Master, Merchant Navy.
- Captain Hugh Campbell, Master, Merchant Navy.
- John Carnegie, Esq., Chief Engineer Officer, Merchant Navy.
- Captain Charles Albert Carter, Master, Merchant Navy.
- William Charles Chesterman, Esq., Acting Secretary, University Grants Committee.
- Lawrence Walter Clayton, Esq., Principal, Home Office.
- Richard Clements, Esq., Midland Regional Officer, National Council of Social Service. For services to Civil Defence.
- Lawrence Edward Coleman, Esq., Fire Force Commander, North-Eastern Area of Scotland.
- Farra Robin Aikman Wiseman Conway, Esq., Town Clerk of Great Yarmouth. For services to Civil Defence.
- Miss Dorothy Sandys Coode, Chairman of the Royal College of Nursing.
- William Oliver Copeman, Esq., Chairman of the Eastern Division Provisions and Groceries Advisory Committee, Ministry of Food.
- Richard Costigan, Esq., Chief Engineer Officer, Merchant Navy.
- John Cowley, Esq., Chief Engineer Officer, Merchant Navy.
- Hugh Gregan Crawford, Esq., M.C., M.R.C.S., L.R.C.P. For services to the Boy Scout Movement in Staffordshire.
- Margaret, Mrs. Hitchcock, Vice-Chairman of the West Suffolk Executive, National Federation of Women's Institutes.
- Captain Victor George Housden, District Inspector, Imperial War Graves Commission.
- Ernest Howcroft, Esq., Joint Secretary of the Textile Machinery and Industrial and Export Group.
- Stanley John Hubbard, Esq., Senior Depot Railways, London Passenger Transport Board.
- Robert William Illing, Esq., Executive Officer, National Debt Office; lately Secretary to the Pacific Cable Board.
- Alexander Innes, Esq., M.B., F.R.C.S., Medical Officer in charge of the Surgical Division, Calderstones Emergency Hospital, Lancashire.
- Frederick Stanley Irvine, Esq., Deputv Principal, Ministry of Finance, Northern Ireland
- Captain David Bruce Ivor, Master, Merchant Navy.
- William Foster Jeffery, Eq., Staff Officer, Admiralty
- Joseph Jelf, Esq., Manager, Tool Room, Accles and Pollock Ltd.
- Edmund Tom Jesty, Esq., Head of Section, Board of Education.
- John Lewis John, Esq., Sub-District Manager, Swansea, Emergency Road Transport Organisation.
- Miss Amy Denton Johns, Manager of the Summerfield Hostel, Kidderminster, National Service Hostels Corporation.
- Archibald Charles Jones, Esq., Senior Staff Officer, Admiralty.
- Charles Jones, Esq., Dock Group Secretary, Transport and General Workers Union, Bristol.
- Dudley Arthur Gortley Jones, Esq., A.F.R.Ae.S., Senior Technical Officer, Ministry of Aircraft Production.
- Herbert Langley Jones, Esq., County Commissioner, Hertfordshire, Order of St. John of Jerusalem. For service to Civil Defence.
- Miss Emma Jones, A.R.R.C., Matron, St. Giles' London County Council Hospital, Camberwell. For services to Civil Defence.
- Marsden Kay, Esq., Manager, Forge and Smithy Department, Vickers-Armstrongs Limited.
- Lawrence Bernard Kean, Eq., Divisional Officer, No. 9 Area, National Fire Service.
- James Keay, Esq., Second Engineer Officer, Merchant Navy.
- Jacob Noble Kerr, Esq., Skipper Of a Steam Trawler.
- Alfred Kilby, Esq., Dock Superintendent, Port of London Authority.
- Miss Margaret Annie Langley, Headmistress, Knowle Hill Girls' School Kenilworth.
- Gerald William Large, Esq., Accountant, National Savings Committee.
- Mary Jane Allen, Mrs. Laverick, J.P., Chairman of the Children's Sub-Committee of the Tynemouth, Wallsend and District War Pensions Committee.
- William Mervyn Law, Esq., A.M.Inst.C.E., Borough Engineer and Surveyor, Wolverhampton. For services to Civil Defence.
- Edgar William Lawrence Esq., Works Manager, Stothert and Pitt Limited.
- Miss May Victoria Leighton, Chief Superintendent of Typists, Ministry of War Transport.
- Flight Captain Asa Foster Lingard, No. 3 Ferry Pool, Air Auxiliary.
- John Eric Russell Little, Esq., Clerical Officer, Office of the Minister of State, Cairo.
- Captain Robert Sheddon Little, Master, Merchant Navy.
- Peter Gillespie Livingston, Esq., Senior Accountant, Ministry of Aircraft Production.
- Robert Loggie, Esq., J.P., Chairman of the Dundee Local Savings Committee.
- Theodore Lord, Esq., Chairman of the Western and South Wales Regional Valuation Boards under the Coal Act, 1938.
- John Loudon, Esq., Chief Engineer Officer, Merchant Navy.
- Captain Leonard John Lovell, Assistant Harbour Master, Port of London Authority.
- Jeanie Russell, Mrs. Lowman, Secretary of the Women's Land Army Committee tor East Sussex.
- Harry Hurley Lush, Esq., Superintendent, Bristol City Police Force.
- John McCarter, Esq., Works Superintendent, A. Wells and Company Limited.
- William Smith McClarence, Esq., Assistant Manager, Philip and Son, Dartmouth.
- Captain Charles Clifford McCreight, Air Raid Precautions Inspector, Ministry of Public Security, Northern Ireland.
- Alexander McCulloch, Esq., Chief Engineer, Office of the City Engineer, Glasgow. For services to Civil Defence.
- Arthur Machan, Esq., Manager, Tool Works, Capital Steel Works.
- John Macleod, Esq., Skipper of a Steam Drifter.
- James Holliday McMath, Esq., Map Curator, War Office.
- Provost John McPhail, J.P., Provost of Tranent, East Lothian.
- Andrew McWilliam, Esq., Inspector of Factories, Ministry of Labour and National Service.
- Captain Frederik Johan Peter Madsen, Danish Consul, Newcastle.
- Elizabeth, Mrs. Main, Assistant County Director, Lanarkshire, British Red Cross Society, Scottish Branch. For services to Civil Defence.
- John Malough, Esq., Assistant Postmaster, Head Post Office, Belfast.
- Walter John Malster, Esq., Divisional Officer, No. 12 Fire Force, National Fire Service.
- Miss Eveline Elsie Mansey, Matron; Lowestoft and North Suffolk Hospital, Lowestoft. For services to Civil Defence.
- Arthur John Maplestone, Esq:, Manager, Mountstuart Drydocks, Limited.
- Miss Mary Eddington Marrian, Staff Officer, Ministry of Health.
- John Stiles Martin, Eq., Works Manager, T. W. Greenwell and Company Limited.
- Eric Christopher Stanley Megaw, Esq., Scientific Officer, Research Laboratories, General Electric Company Limited.
- Henry Herbert Miller, Esq., Senior Staff Officer, Ministry of Agriculture and Fisheries.
- Thomas William Morgan, Esq., Works Manager, Marconi's Wireless Telegraph Company Limited.
- George Frederick Mortimer, Esq., Technical Officer, Admiralty.
- John Henry Mottram, Esq., Area Technical Assistant, London Midland and Scottish Railway Company.
- Miss Ellen Agnes Munro, Organiser, South-Eastern District of Scotland, Women's Voluntary Services for Civil Defence.

=== Order of the Companions of Honour (CH) ===
- The Very Reverend Joseph Herman Hertz, LL.D., Chief Rabbi of the United Hebrew Congregations of the British Empire.
- The Right Honourable Frederick James, Baron Leathers, Minister of War Transport.

=== Kaisar-i-Hind Gold Medal for public services in India ===
- Philippa, Lady Hartley (wife of General Sir Alan Hartley, K.C.S.I., C.B, D.S.O., A.D.C., Deputy Commander-in-Chief in India).
- Helen, Mrs Martin (wife of Mr O.M. Martin, C.I.E., I.C.S., Commissioner, Chittagong Division), Bengal.
- Miss Kathleen Mabel Myers, Principal, Queen Mary's College for Women, Madras.
- Shrimati Sitabaisaheb Bhalchandrarao alias Maisaheb Patwardhan, Dowager Rani Saheb of Kurundwad (Senior) State.
- Meher Fardunji, Mrs Talyarkhan (wife of Mr F.S. Talyarkhan), Bombay.
- Edmund Willoughby Legh, Esq., C.I.E., Indian Civil Service (retired), Madras.
- Charles Stanley Garland Mylrea, Esq., O.B.E., lately Member of the Arabian Mission of the Dutch Reformed Church of America at Kuwait, Persian Gulf.

== Canada ==
=== Order of the Bath ===
==== Companion of the Order of the Bath (CB) ====
Military Division

- Vice-Admiral Percy W. Nelles, Royal Canadian Navy
- Lieutenant-General Henry Duncan Graham Crerar, D.S.O., Commander, I Canadian Corps.
- Lieutenant-General Kenneth Stuart, D.S.O., M.C., Chief of the General Staff, Canada.
- Major-General the Honourable Percival John Montague, C.M.G., D.S.O., M.C., V.D., Senior Officer, Canadian Military Headquarters, London.
- Major-General Guy Roderick Turner, M.C., D.C.M., Deputy Adjutant and Quartermaster General, Royal Canadian Army
- Air Marshal Lloyd Samuel Breadner, D.S.C., (C. 39) Chief of the Air Staff, Royal Canadian Air Force.
- Air Marshal Harold Edwards, (C. 30) Air Officer Commanding-in-Chief, Overseas, Royal Canadian Air Force.

=== Order of the British Empire ===
==== Commander of the Order of the British Empire (CBE) ====
Military Division

- Engineer Captain George Leslie Stephens, Royal Canadian Navy
- Brigadier George Brock Chisholm, M.C., Director General Medical Services.
- Brigadier John Henry MacQueen, Deputy Quarter-Master-General, Canadian Military Headquarters.
- Brigadier Ernest James Renaud, O.B.E., Deputy Quarter-Master-General, National Defence Headquarters.
- Brigadier Guy Granyille Simonds, Commander, I Canadian Infantry Brigade
- Brigadier Antonin Theriault, The Royal Canadian Ordnance Corps.
- Brigadier (Honorary Brigadier-General) John Burton White, D.S.O., E.D., Commander Canadian Forestry Corps.
- Air Vice-Marshal George Mitchell Croil, A.F.C. (C. 65) Inspector General Royal Canadian Air Force.
- Air Commodore Richard Reeve Collard, (C. 1253) Director of Works and Buildings, Royal Canadian Air Force.

==== Officer of the Order of the British Empire (OBE) ====
- Acting Captain Edmund Johnstone, Royal Canadian Navy.
- Shipwright Commander Charles Henry Brown, Royal Canadian Navy
- Captain Edmond Rollo Mainguy, Royal Canadian Navy.
- Acting Captain George Ralph Miles, Royal Canadian Navy.
- Acting Captain Horatio Nelson Lay, Royal Canadian Navy.
- Lieutenant-Commander Norman Vincent Clark, Royal Canadian Naval Reserve.
- Lieutenant-Commander (temporary) Charles Copelin, Royal Canadian Naval Reserve.
- Lieutenant (E) Louis Gerard Fabiante Despres, Royal Canadian Naval Reserve.
- Lieutenant-Commander (E) (Ty.) Joseph Mahue, Royal Canadian Naval Reserve.
- Lieutenant-Commander (E) (Ty.) Alfred Borden Arnison, Royal Canadian Naval Reserve.
- Lieutenant-Colonel (Ordnance Officer 2nd Class) Harold Milton Bailey, V.D., The Royal Canadian Ordnance Corps.
- Lieutenant-Colonel (acting Colonel) George Hedley Basher, E.D., The Royal Regiment of Canada.
- Lieutenant-Colonel Joseph Paul Emile Bernatchez, The Royal 22e Regiment.
- Lieutenant-Colonel Milton, Herbert Brown, The Royal Canadian Army Medical Corps.
- Lieutenant-Colonel Alexander Douglas Cameron, D.S.O., M.C., General List.
- Lieutenant-Colonel Colin Alexander Campbell, The Corps of Royal Canadian Engineers.
- Lieutenant-Colonel Duncan Stewart Forbes, M.C., A.17 (M.G.) Training .Centre.
- Lieutenant-Colonel George Ulric Francoeur, V.D., Le Regiment de Maisonneuve.
- Lieutenant-Colonel Reginald William Frost, D.S.O., E.D., 22 Canadian Armoured Regiment (The Canadian Grenadier Guards), Canadian Armoured Corps.
- Lieutenant-Colonel Fraser Fowler Fulton, The Royal Canadian Corps of Signals.
- Lieutenant-Colonel Kenneth Maitland Holloway, The Royal Canadian Regiment.
- Lieutenant-Colonel Andrew Herbert Jarvis, The Royal Canadian Army Service Corps.
- Lieutenant-Colonel Lewis Truman Lowther, E.D., 17 Armoured Regiment.
- Lieutenant-Colonel Eunton Thomas Pointon, The Royal Canadian Army Pay Corps.
- Lieutenant-Colonel Walford Douglas Somerled Rorison, M.C., V.D., Irish-Fusiliers (Vancouver Regiment), 2nd Battalion.
- Lieutenant-Colonel James Desmond Blaise Smith, I Armoured Car Regiment .(The Royal Canadian Dragoons), Canadian Armoured Corps.
- Lieutenant-Colonel Percy Arthur Stanley Todd, E.D., The Royal Canadian Artillery
- Wing Commander James Alexander Hutchison, (C. 1142) Royal Canadian Air Force.
- Wing Commander Albert Henry Stewart Gillson, (C. 1537) Royal Canadian-Air Force.
- Wing Commander Benjamin Ball (R.A.F. 36009).
- Group Captain Gordon Roy McGregor, D.F.C., (C. 936), Royal Canadian Air Force, Alaska.
- Wing Commander Clarke Levi Annis (C. 196), Eastern Air Command, Royal Canadian Air Force.
