= Robert Crosbie (disambiguation) =

Robert Crosbie may refer to:

- Robert Crosbie (1849-1919), Canadian theosophist
- Robert Edward Harold Crosbie (1886-1950), English Spiritualist and author
- Bob Crosbie (1925-1994), Scottish footballer

== See also ==
- Robert Crosby
