= 838 Naval Air Squadron =

Inactive flying squadron of the Royal Navy's Fleet Air Arm

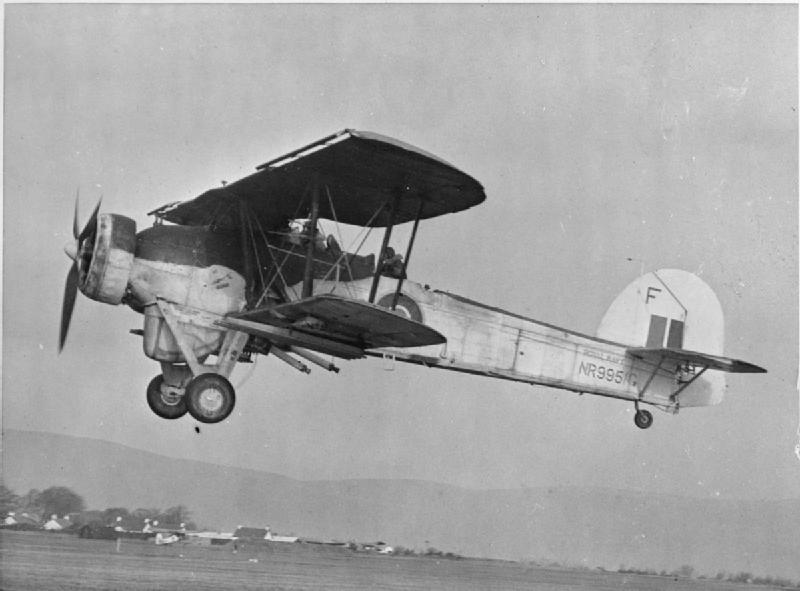
- Fairey Swordfish; Note with radar dome, an example of the type used by 838 NAS
- Active: 1942–1943; 1943 –1945
- Disbanded: 3 February 1945
- Country: United Kingdom
- Branch: Royal Navy
- Type: Torpedo Bomber Reconnaissance squadron
- Role: Carrier-based: anti-submarine warfare (ASW); anti-surface warfare (ASuW); Maritime patrol; Combat air patrol (CAP)
- Part of: Fleet Air Arm
- Home station: See Naval air stations section for full list.
- Engagements: World War II: European theatre of World War II; Battle of the Atlantic; Operation Neptune
- Battle honours: Atlantic 1943; Normandy 1944

Insignia
- Identification Markings: 2A+ then single letters (Swordfish); single letters (Wildcat)

Aircraft flown
- Bomber: Fairey Swordfish
- Fighter: Grumman Wildcat

838 Naval Air Squadron (838 NAS), also called 838 Squadron, is an inactive Fleet Air Arm (FAA) naval air squadron of the United Kingdom’s Royal Navy (RN). The unit was last operational during World War II, primarily utilising the Fairey Swordfish torpedo bomber throughout the conflict. In 1944, it briefly incorporated the Grumman Wildcat fighter aircraft for combat air patrol (CAP) missions.

It had formed and worked-up at RN Air Section Dartmouth, Nova Scotia, on 15 May 1942, and had flown across country to San Francisco, thirty-five and a half hours' flying time in a journey spread over seven and a half days. Established as a Torpedo, Bomber, Reconnaissance (TBR) squadron. It arrived at the US Naval Air Station at Alameda Island, California, in August, but did not board HMS Attacker until December. HMS Attacker went through the Panama Canal to HMS Asbury, RNAS Quonset Point, Rhode Island, where the squadron stayed for two months starting January 1943, before re-boarding in March to escort a convoy from the Caribbean to the UK. After arriving at HMS Landrail, RNAS Machrihanish, Scotland, in April, it took on Merchant Aircraft Carrier (MAC-ship) duties, relocating to RNAS Maydown, Northern Ireland, in June. The squadron was assigned to the MAC-ship, MV Rapana, in August, before disbanding to form 'L' Flight of 836 Naval Air Squadron.

Re-formed at HMS Gadwall, RNAS Belfast in November 1943, from a flight of 818 Naval Air Squadron as a TBR unit. After training on HMS Nairana, the squadron strength grew at HMS Nightjar, RNAS Inskip, in February 1944, and then again at HMS Landrail, RNAS Machrihanish, on 1 April. Later in the month, the squadron relocated to RAF Harrowbeer, working with RAF Coastal Command's No. 156 (GR) Wing on anti-submarine missions in the English Channel, using radar-equipped Fairey Swordfish just before and during the Normandy Landings. It later moved north to RAF Long Kesh in Northern Ireland and then to Scottish bases like RAF Benbecula and RAF Fraserburgh. In October at HMS Gannet, RNAS Eglinton, a flight of four Grumman Wildcat Mk VI fighters was created for escort carrier duty, but this was transferred to 856 Naval Air Squadron while 838 Naval Air Squadron moved to RAF Thorney Island, disbanding in February 1945.

== History ==
=== Torpedo, bomber, reconnaissance squadron (1942-1943) ===
On 10 April 1942, the nucleus of 838 Naval Air Squadron gathered at RNAS Eastleigh (HMS Raven) in Hampshire, led by Lieutenant Commander J.R.C. Callandar, RN. They embarked on the troopship MV Banfora, setting sail for Halifax, Nova Scotia. Upon arrival, they disembarked at RN Air Section Dartmouth (HMS Seaborn), which was located at the Royal Canadian Air Force station of the same name, on 15 May.

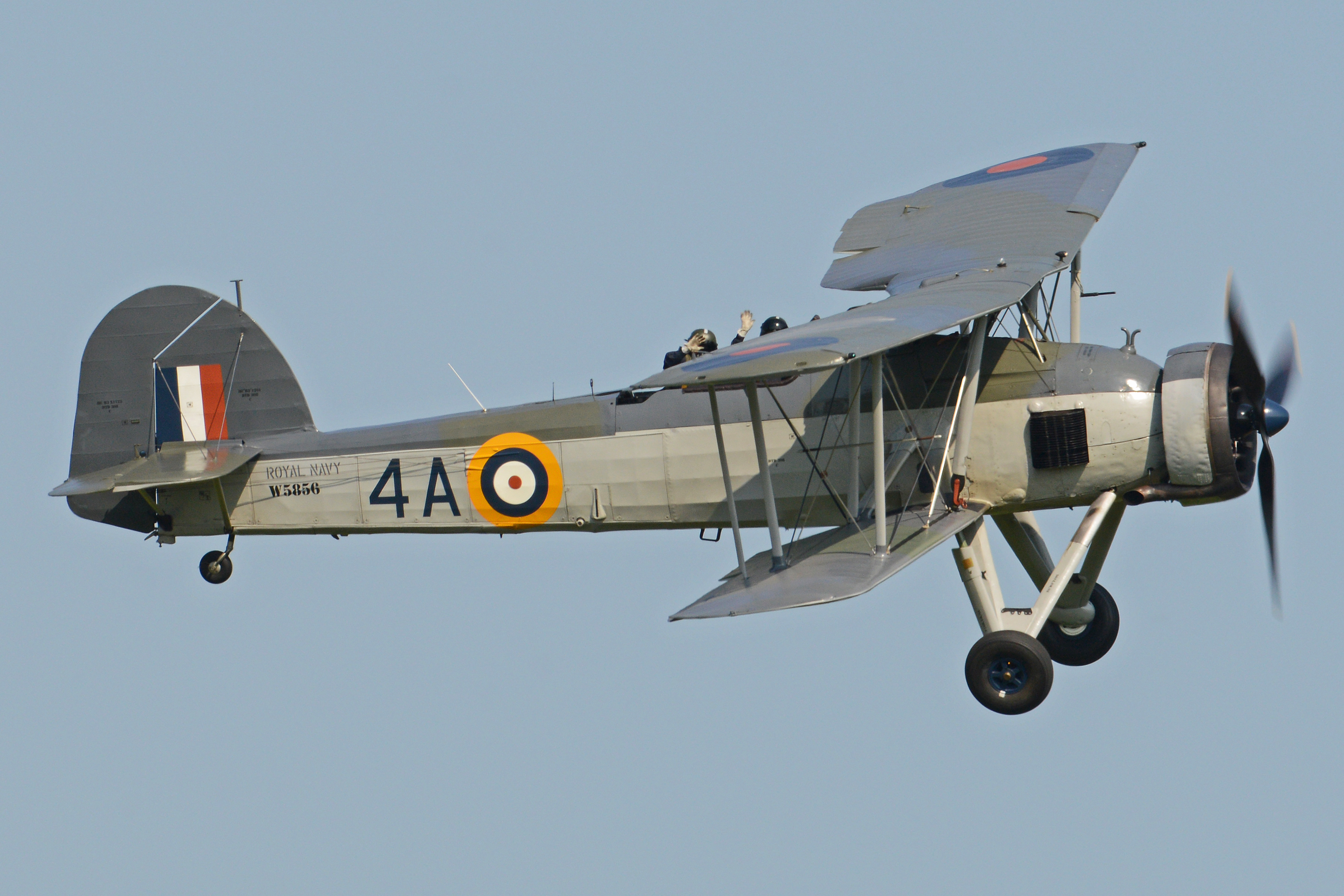
Fairey Swordfish I; an example of the type used by 838 Squadron

The squadron was then officially established at the Air Section (HMS Seaborn), at Dartmouth, on that date, designated as a torpedo, bomber, reconnaissance (TBR) squadron, equipped with four Fairey Swordfish I biplane torpedo bombers. It was designated for service aboard the lead ship of her class of escort carrier, HMS Attacker, which was in the process of being outfitted at the Mare Island Naval Shipyard in Vallejo, California. The squadron was scheduled to rendezvous with the ship in San Francisco for training exercises. Arrangements were made for a cross-country flight, which was planned as a seven-and-a-half-day journey divided into fifteen segments The total flying time from Halifax amounted to thirty-five and a half hours:

The journey commenced in Halifax, proceeding to Bangor, Maine, followed by travel to Montreal, Quebec, Canada. An overnight stay was made in Kingston, Ontario, before continuing to Selfridge Field in Detroit. From Detroit, the route led to Battle Creek, Michigan, and then to Chicago, where another overnight stay occurred. The trip then advanced to Des Moines, although a detour resulted in landing in Moline, Illinois. After departing Moline, the next destination was Omaha, which also included an overnight stay. The itinerary continued from Omaha to North Platte, Nebraska, then to Cheyenne, Wyoming, and subsequently to Rock Springs, Wyoming. The next stop was Salt Lake City, Utah, where an overnight stay was again made. Following this, the journey proceeded to Elko, Nevada, and then to Reno, Nevada, which included another overnight stay, before concluding at the US Naval Air Station Alameda, San Francisco in California, on 6 August,

HMS Attacker commenced its sea and flight trials near San Francisco on 12 November, carrying the four Fariey Swordfish I aircraft from 838 Naval Air Squadron. After successfully completing her trials and shake down, she was deemed fit for duty and departed from San Francisco for Balboa, Panama, on 12 December. 838 Naval Air Squadron disembarked to RNAS Quonset Point (HMS Asbury), on 1 January 1943. A US Naval Air Station loaned to the Admiralty and commissioned from October 1942.

On 2 March, the squadron re-embarked and departed from RNAS Quonset Point, to offer aerial support for an Atlantic convoy heading east. HMS Attacker joined convoy CU.01 on 20 March as a member of the escort team, delivering anti-submarine protection during the Atlantic voyage. The vessel reached the Clyde on 1 April and set sail for Liverpool the next day, where 838 Naval Air Squadron disembarked, flying to RNAS Machrihanish (HMS Landrail), Argyll and Bute, Scotland.

The squadron was reassigned for Merchant Aircraft Carrier (MAC-ship) operations, leading to the withdrawal of the Mk I Fairey Swordfish and the introduction of new Mk II aircraft. On 7 June, Lieutenant(A) R.G. Large, RNVR, took command, and on 13 June, the squadron relocated to RNAS Maydown in County Londonderry, Northern Ireland.

On 9 July, the squadron traveled to the training carrier HMS Argus for a day of Deck Landing Training (DLT). Subsequently, they boarded the British-built escort carrier HMS Activity, on 18 July, to undergo a rigorous workup and an intensive DLT session, concluding with their disembarkation at RNAS Belfast (HMS Gadwall), County Antrim, on 30 July. The squadron then joined the MAC-ship MV Rapana on 2 August for trials; however, due to a policy shift, the squadron was integrated into 836 Naval Air Squadron on 13 August, becoming 'L' Flight of 836 Naval Air Squadron.

=== Torpedo, bomber, reconnaissance squadron (1943-1945) ===
On 1 November 1943, 838 Naval Air Squadron was re-established at RNAS Belfast, originating from a segment of 818 Naval Air Squadron. It was designated as a torpedo bomber reconnaissance squadron, equipped with four Fairey Swordfish II aircraft and was commanded by Lieutenant Commander(A) J.M. Brown, DSC, RNVR.

On 17 December, the squadron embarked in the name ship of her class of escort carrier, HMS Nairana, for training exercises in the Clyde, disembarking at RNAS Dunino (HMS Jackdaw II), Fife, on 16 January 1944. Subsequently, they relocated to RNAS Inskip (HMS Nightjar), Lancashire, in February, where the number of aircraft increased to nine. On 18 March, they transferred to RNAS Machrihanish, and by 1 April, the squadron expanded to twelve aircraft.

On 20 April 1944, the squadron relocated southward to integrate with No. 156 (General Reconnaissance) Wing of RAF Coastal Command at RAF Harrowbeer, Devon, where it engaged in anti-submarine missions in the English Channel. At this point its twelve Fairey Swordfish II and III, were outfitted with Air-to-surface-vessel radar (ASV) Mk.XI, but experienced the loss of three aircraft during their initial mission on 30 April.

The squadron later withdrew to Northern Ireland, arriving at RAF Long Kesh, Lisburn and then on 19 August, Lieutenant Commander P. Snow, RN, took command. The squadron later relocated to RNAS Maydown, on 27. Then Subsequently, returned to RAF Coastal Command in Scotland, locations including RAF Benbecula in the Outer Hebrides and RAF Fraserburgh in Aberdeenshire.

On 27 October, a fighter flight was established at RNAS Eglinton (HMS Gannet), County Londonderry, with four Grumman Wildcat Mk VI fighter aircraft. However, this flight was reassigned to 856 Naval Air Squadron by the end of November. The squadron made its final relocation to RAF Thorney Island, Sussex, on 15 November and was officially disbanded there on 3 February 1945.

== Aircraft operated ==
The squadron has operated a couple of different aircraft types:

- Fairey Swordfish I torpedo bomber (May 1942 - April 1943)
- Fairey Swordfish II torpedo bomber (April - October 1943, November 1943 - February 1945)
- Fairey Swordfish III torpedo bomber (May 1944 - February 1945)
- Grumman Wildcat Mk VI fighter aircraft (October - November 1944)

== Battle honours ==
The battle honours awarded to 838 Naval Air Squadron are:

- Atlantic 1943
- Normandy 1944

== Naval air stations ==
838 Naval Air Squadron operated mostly from a number of naval air stations of the Royal Navy in the UK and overseas, a number of Royal Air Force stations, a couple of Royal Navy escort carriers and a merchant aircraft carrier:

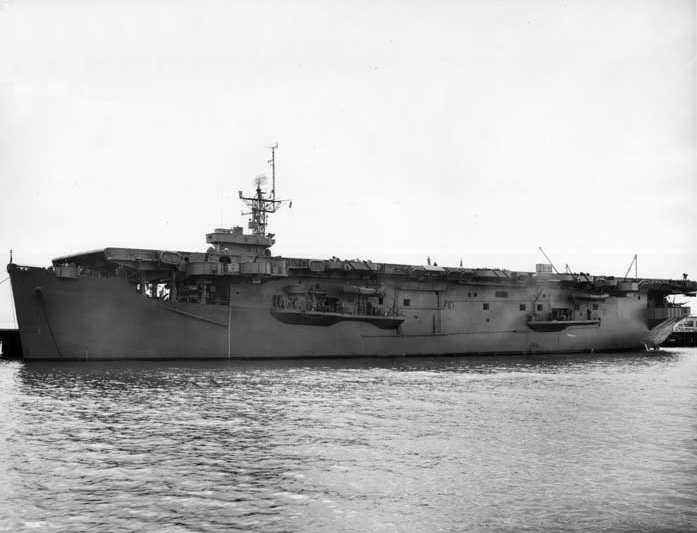
HMS Attacker, ex-USS Barnes (CVE-20)

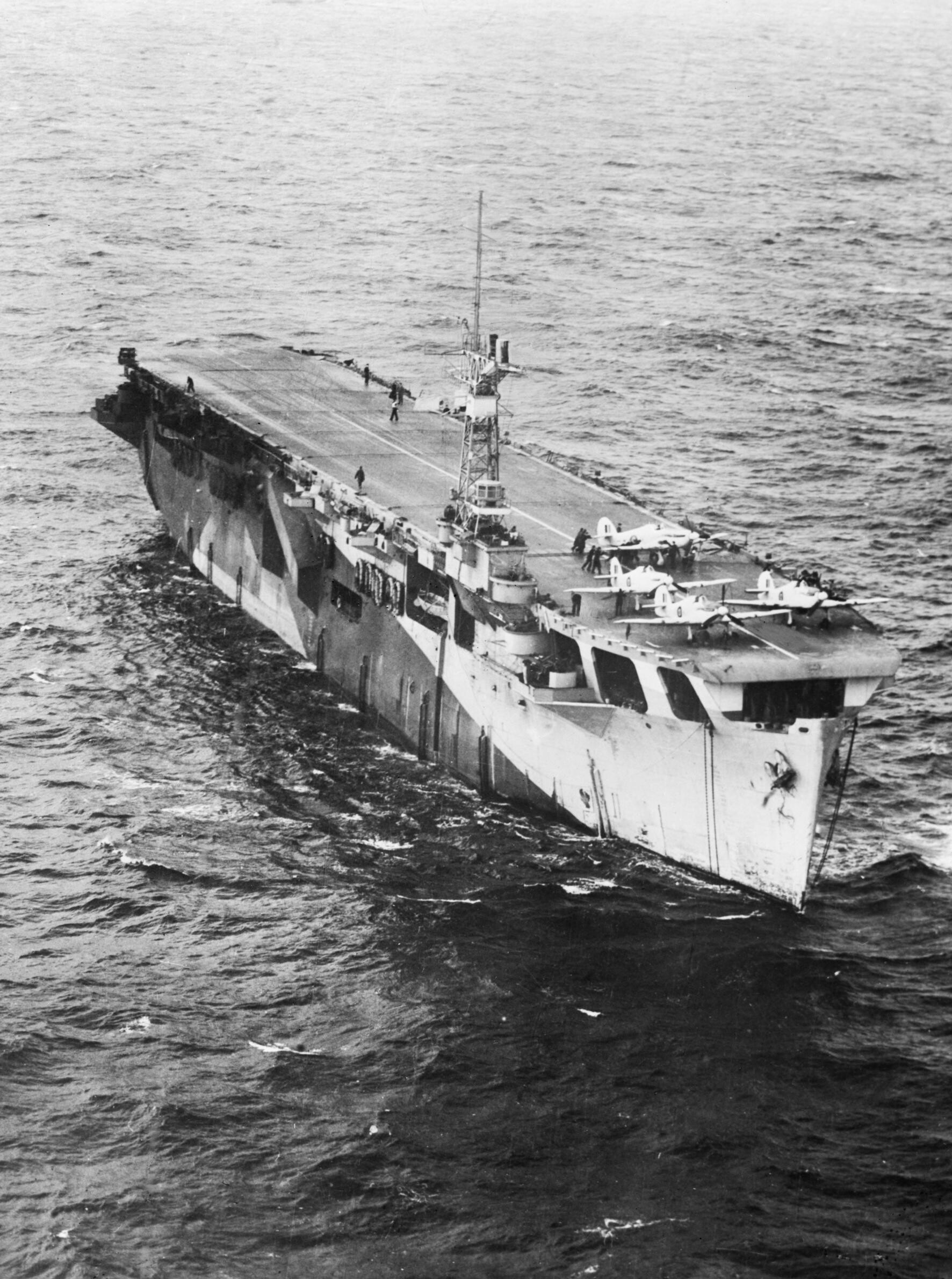
HMS Nairana

1942 - 1943

- RN Air Section Dartmouth (HMS Seaborn), Nova Scotia, (15 May - 1 August 1942)
- transit (1 - 6 August 1942)
- Naval Air Station Alameda, California, (6 August - 12 December 1942)
- HMS Attacker (12 December - 1 January 1942)
- Royal Naval Air Station Quonset Point (HMS Asbury), Rhode Island, (1 January - 2 March 1943)
- HMS Attacker (2 March - 1 April 1943)
- Royal Naval Air Station Machrihanish (HMS Landrail), Argyll and Bute, (1 April - 13 June 1943)
- Royal Naval Air Station Maydown, County Londonderry, (13 June - 9 July 1943)
- HMS Argus (Deck Landing Training (DLT) 9–18 July 1943)
- HMS Activity (18 - 30 July 1943)
- Royal Naval Air Station Belfast (HMS Gadwall), County Antrim, (30 July - 2 August 1943)
- MV Rapana (2 - 28 August 1943)
- Royal Naval Air Station Maydown, County Londonderry, (28 - 31 August 1943)
- MV Rapana (31 August - 11 September 1943)
- RN Air Section Dartmouth (HMS Seaborn), Nova Scotia, (11 - 26 September 1943)
- MV Rapana (26 September - 12 October 1943)
- Royal Naval Air Station Maydown, County Londonderry, (12 - 13 October 1943)
- became 836 Naval Air Squadron - 'L' Flight - (13 October 1943)

1943 - 1945

- Royal Naval Air Station Belfast (HMS Gadwall), County Antrim, (1 November - 17 December 1943)
- HMS Nairana (17 December 1943 - 16 January 1944)
- Royal Naval Air Station Dunino (HMS Jackdaw II), Fife, (16 January - 6 February 1944)
- Royal Naval Air Station Inskip (HMS Nightjar), Lancashire, (6 February - 18 March 1944)
- Royal Naval Air Station Machrihanish (HMS Landrail), Argyll and Bute, (18 March - 20 April 1944)
- Royal Air Force Harrowbeer, Devon, (156 Wg) (20 April - 8 August 1944)
- Royal Naval Air Station Worthy Down (HMS Kestrel), Hampshire, (8 - 9 August 1944)
- Royal Air Force Long Kesh, Lisburn, (9 - 27 August 1944)
- Royal Naval Air Station Maydown (HMS Shrike), County Londonderry, (27 August - 10 September 1944)
- Royal Air Force Long Kesh, Lisburn, (10 - 12 September 1944)
- Royal Air Force Benbecula, Benbecula, Outer Hebrides, (12 - 29 September 1944)
- Royal Air Force Dallachy, Moray, (18 Gp) (29 September - 22 October 1944)
- Royal Air Force Fraserburgh, Aberdeenshire, (22 October - 15 November 1944)
  - Royal Air Force Benbecula, Benbecula, Outer Hebrides, (Detachment 1–2 November 1944)
- Wildcat Fighter Flight:
  - Royal Naval Air Station Eglinton (HMS Gannet), County Londonderry, (27 October - 29 November 1944)
  - to 856 Naval Air Squadron (29 November 1944)
- Royal Air Force Thorney Island, West Sussex, (15 November 1944 - 3 February 1945)
- disbanded - (3 February 1945)

== Commanding officers ==
List of commanding officers of 838 Naval Air Squadron with date of appointment:

1942 - 1943

- Lieutenant Commander J.R.C. Callandar, RN, from 15 May 1942
- Lieutenant Commander(A) R.G. Lawson, RNVR, from 7 June 1943
- disbanded - 12 October 1943

1943 - 1945

- Lieutenant Commander(A) J.M. Brown, DSC, RNVR, from 1 November 1943
- Lieutenant Commander P. Snow, RN, from 19 August 1944
- disbanded - 3 February 1945

Note: Abbreviation (A) signifies Air Branch of the RN or RNVR.
