= 852 Naval Air Squadron =

Inactive flying squadron of the Royal Navy's Fleet Air Arm

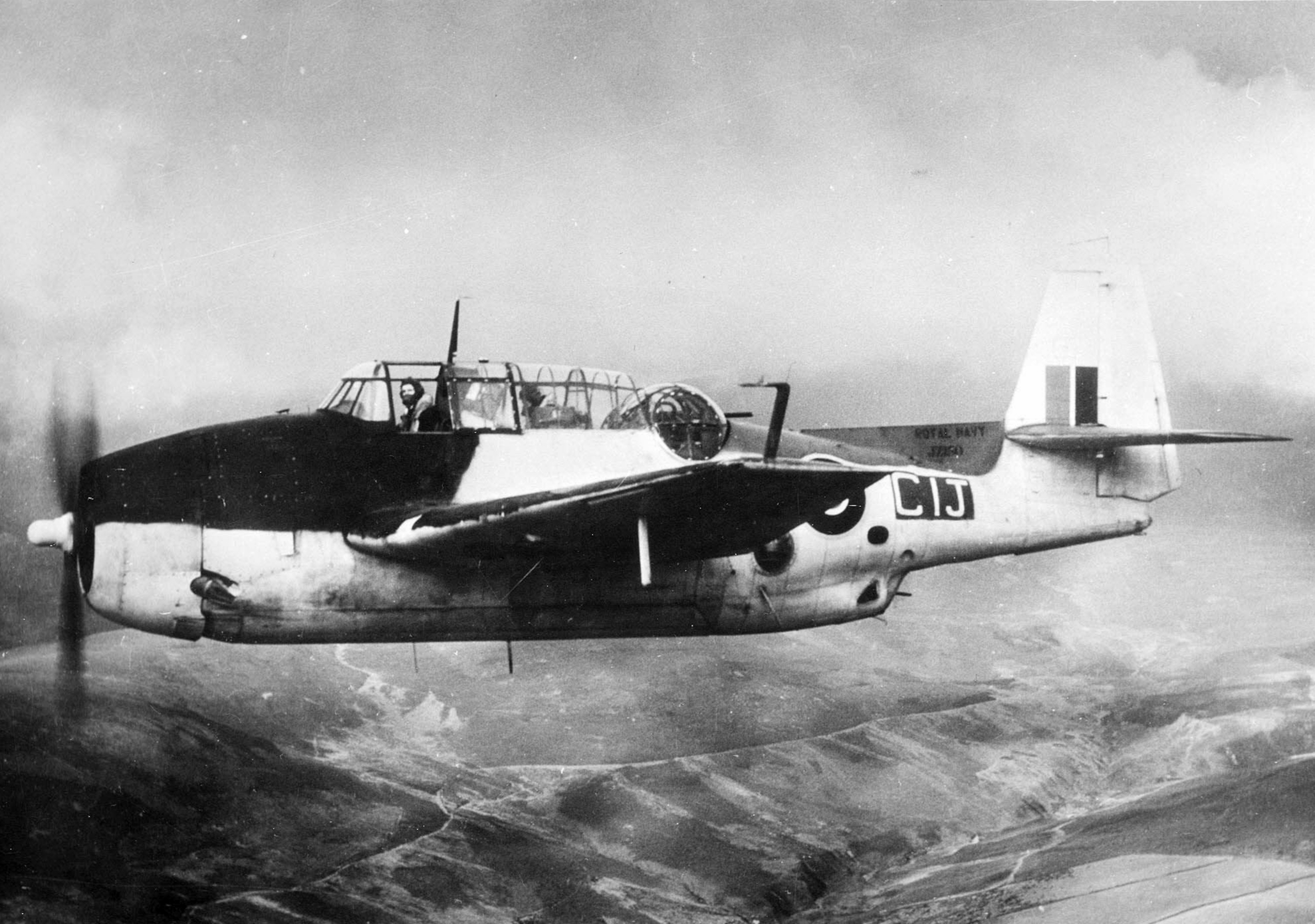
- A Fleet Air Arm Grumman Avenger Mk.I; an example of the type used by 852 NAS
- Active: 1943–1944
- Disbanded: 17 October 1944
- Country: United Kingdom
- Branch: Royal Navy
- Type: Torpedo Bomber Reconnaissance squadron
- Role: Carrier-based: anti-submarine warfare (ASW); anti-surface warfare (ASuW); Combat air patrol (CAP]
- Size: Twelve aircraft
- Part of: Fleet Air Arm
- Home station: See Naval air stations section for full list.
- Engagements: World War II: European theatre of World War II
- Battle honours: Norway 1944

Insignia
- Identification Markings: 2A+ (Avenger); single letters (Wildcat); 2A+ (Wildcat later)

Aircraft flown
- Bomber: Grumman Avenger
- Fighter: Grumman Wildcat

852 Naval Air Squadron (852 NAS), also called 852 Squadron, is an inactive Fleet Air Arm (FAA) naval air squadron of the United Kingdom’s Royal Navy (RN). It operated both Grumman Avenger torpedo bomber and Grumman Wildcat fighter aircraft between 1943 and 1944.

It was established at Squantum, Massachusetts, in November 1943, as a Torpedo Bomber Reconnaissance with Grumman Avenger Mk.I. In February 1944, the squadron travelled across the USA to California, before embarking in HMS Nabob. After training and adding a flight of four Grumman Wildcat Mk V, the squadron re-embarked for anti-shipping missions and mine-laying off the coast of Norway. The carrier was hit by a torpedo but managed to return to Scapa Flow in August. 852 Naval Air Squadron then moved to HMS Trumpeter, where the fighter flight upgraded to Grumman Wildcat Mk VI, but the squadron was disbanded in October.

== History ==
=== Torpedo, Bomber, Reconnaissance squadron (1943-1944) ===
The squadron was officially established on 1 November 1943 at RN Air Section Squantum, which was situated at Naval Air Station Squantum, Quincy, Massachusetts, designated as a Torpedo Bomber Reconnaissance unit, equipped with twelve Grumman Avenger Mk.I torpedo bomber aircraft.

In February 1944, the squadron traveled across the United States to California, making overnight stops in Virginia, Arkansas, and Texas, before boarding the Ruler-class escort carrier, HMS Nabob.

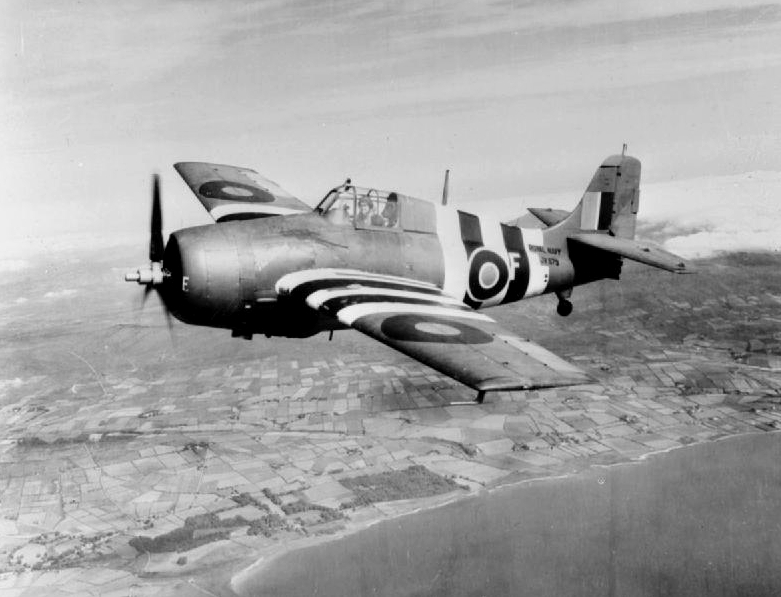
A Fleet Air Arm Grumman Wildcat; an example of the type used by 852 Squadron

The squadron arrived at RNAS Machrihanish (HMS Landrail), Argyll and Bute, Scotland, on 6 April. In May 1944, a contingent of four Grumman Wildcat Mk V fighter aircraft was incorporated into the squadron, which subsequently re-embarked to conduct mine-laying operations and anti-shipping missions in the waters off Norway.

On 22 August, the vessel was struck by a torpedo from the German submarine U-354; nevertheless, it was able to return to Scapa Flow, arriving on 27 August. The squadron was reassigned to the Ruler-class escort channel, HMS Trumpeter, on 9 October. The fighter unit underwent re-equipment with Grumman Wildcat Mk VIs. However, on 17 October the squadron was disbanded.

A proposal to reform the squadron for deployment in the East Indies Fleet in July 1945 ultimately did not come to fruition.

== Aircraft flown ==
The squadron has flown a couple of different aircraft types:

- Grumman Avenger Mk.I torpedo bomber (November 1943 - October 1944)
- Grumman Wildcat Mk V fighter aircraft (May - September 1944)
- Grumman Wildcat Mk VI fighter aircraft (September - October 1944)

== Battle honours ==
The following Battle Honours have been awarded to 852 Naval Air Squadron:

- Norway 1944

== Naval air stations and aircraft carriers ==
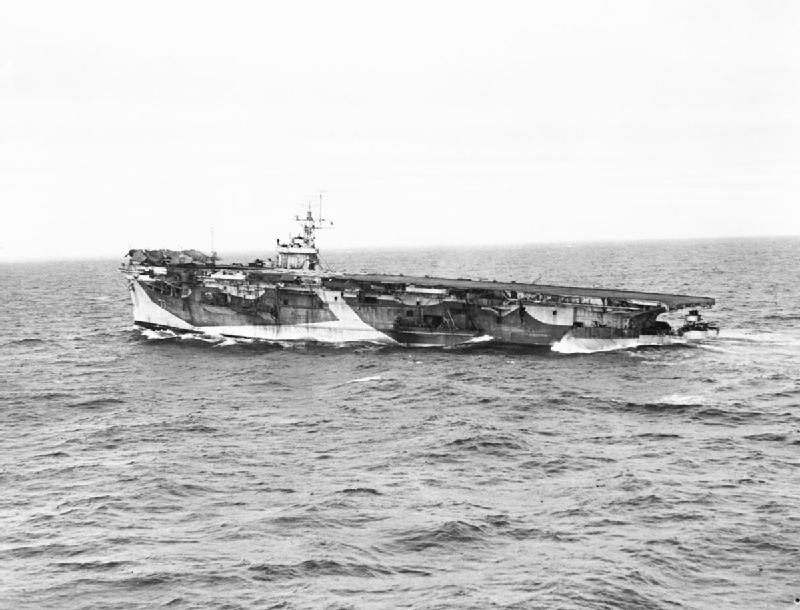
HMS Nabob

852 Naval Air Squadron operated from a number of naval air stations of the Royal Navy, in the UK and also a number of Royal Navy escort carriers and other airbases overseas:

- RN Air Section Squantum, Massachusetts, (1 November 1943 - 2 February 1944)
- transit (2 - 10 February 1944)
- Naval Air Station Alameda, California, (10 - 12 February 1944)
- HMS Nabob (12 February - 6 April 1944)
- Royal Naval Air Station Machrihanish (HMS Landrail), Argyll and Bute, (6 April - 8 May 1944)
- Royal Naval Air Station Maydown (HMS Shrike), County Londonderry, (8 - 20 May 1944)
- Royal Naval Air Station Machrihanish (HMS Landrail), Argyll and Bute, (20 May - 29 June 1944)
- HMS Nabob (29 June - 8 July 1944)
- Royal Naval Air Station Abbotsinch (HMS Sanderling), Renfrewshire, (8 - 12 July 1944)
- Royal Naval Air Station Machrihanish (HMS Landrail), Argyll and Bute, (12 - 14 July 1944)
- HMS Nabob (14 July - 30 August 1944)
- Royal Naval Air Station Hatston (HMS Sparrowhawk), Mainland, Orkney, (30 August - 10 September 1944)
- HMS Trumpeter (10 - 13 September 1944)
- Royal Naval Air Station Hatston (HMS Sparrowhawk), Mainland, Orkney, (13 - 23 September 1944)
- HMS Trumpeter (23 September - 7 October 1944)
  - HMS Fencer (Detachment four aircraft 27 September - 7 October 1944)
- Royal Naval Air Station Hatston (HMS Sparrowhawk), Mainland, Orkney, (7 - 10 October 1944)
  - HMS Trumpeter (Detachment three aircraft 12 - 17 October 1944)
- HMS Fencer (10 - 16 October 1944)
- Royal Naval Air Station Hatston (HMS Sparrowhawk), Mainland, Orkney, (16 - 17 October 1944)
- disbanded - (17 October 1944)

== Commanding officers ==
List of commanding officers of 852 Naval Air Squadron, with date of appointment:

- Lieutenant Commander(A) R.E. Bradshaw, DSC & Bar, RN, from 1 November 1943
- disbanded - 17 October 1944

Note: Abbreviation (A) signifies Air Branch of the RN or RNVR.
