= HMS Nabob (D77) =

Escort carrier

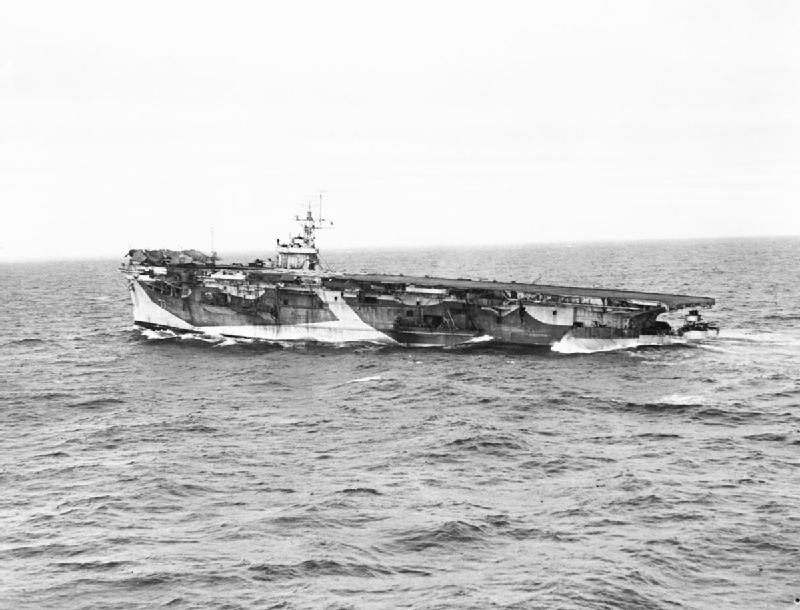
- Nabob returning home after being torpedoed in August 1944

History

United States
- Name: USS Edisto
- Builder: Seattle-Tacoma Shipbuilding Corporation
- Laid down: 20 October 1942
- Launched: 22 March 1943
- Identification: AVG-41; ACV-41; CVE-41
- Fate: Transferred to Royal Navy

United Kingdom
- Name: HMS Nabob
- Commissioned: 7 September 1943
- Decommissioned: 10 October 1944
- Identification: Pennant number D77
- Fate: Returned to US 1946, sold for scrap, but resold for conversion to mercantile use
- Name: Nabob (1952–67); Glory (1967–77)
- Port of registry: West Germany (1952–67); Panama (1967–77)
- In service: 1952
- Out of service: 1977
- Identification: IMO number: 5245045
- Fate: Sold for scrap, 1977

General characteristics
- Class & type: Ruler-class escort carrier (UK)
- Displacement: 11,400 long tons (11,600 t) (standard); 15,390 long tons (15,640 t) (full)
- Length: 492 ft 3 in (150.0 m)
- Beam: 69 ft 6 in (21.2 m) wl; 108 ft 6 in (33.1 m) max
- Draught: 25 ft 5 in (7.7 m)
- Installed power: 2 × Foster Wheeler boilers; 8,500 shp (6,338 kW)
- Propulsion: 1 × Allis-Chalmers geared steam turbine; 1 shaft
- Speed: 18 knots (33 km/h)
- Range: 27,500 nmi (50,930 km) at 11 knots (20 km/h) max
- Endurance: 3,160 long tons (3,210 t) fuel oil
- Complement: 646
- Sensors & processing systems: SG surface search radar; SK air search radar
- Armament: 2 × 5-inch (127 mm)/51 cal. guns; 8 × twin 40 mm Bofors guns; 14 × twin Oerlikon 20 mm cannon; 7 × single Oerlikon 20 mm cannon
- Aircraft carried: 18–24
- Aviation facilities: 450 ft × 80 ft (137 m × 24 m) flight deck; 260 ft × 62 ft × 18 ft (79 m × 19 m × 5 m) hangar

HMS Nabob (D77) was a Ruler-class escort aircraft carrier which served in the Royal Navy during 1943 and 1944. The ship was built in the United States as the Bogue-class USS Edisto (CVE-41) (originally AVG-41 then later ACV-41) but did not serve with the United States Navy. In August 1944 the ship was torpedoed by the German submarine U-354 while participating in an attack on the German battleship Tirpitz. Nabob survived the attack, but upon returning to port, was considered too damaged to repair. The escort carrier remained in port for the rest of the war and was returned to the United States following it. Nabob is one of two Royal Navy escort carriers built in the United States which is listed as lost in action (both of which were damaged beyond repair, but returned) during World War II. The ship was sold for scrap by the United States but found a second life when purchased and converted for mercantile use under her British name, Nabob. Later renamed Glory, the ship was sold for scrapping in 1977.

== Design and description ==
The Bogue class were larger and had a greater aircraft capacity than all the preceding American-built escort carriers. They were also all laid down as escort carriers and not converted merchant ships. The Ruler type vessels were essentially a repeat version of the Attacker class. Based on the Type C3 design, the Ruler class were acquired by the Royal Navy as part of Lend-Lease after delays in the construction of the Casablanca class, which the Royal Navy had intended to acquire. All the vessels in the class had a complement of 646 officers and ratings and an overall length of 492 feet 3 inches (150.0 m), a beam of 69 feet 6 inches (21.2 m) at the waterline and 108 feet 6 inches (33.07 m) total with a mean draught of 25 ft 5 in (7.7 m). The escort carriers had a standard displacement of 11,400 long tons (11,600 t) and a deep load displacement of 15,390 long tons (15,640 t). Propulsion was provided by one shaft turned by an Allis-Chalmers geared steam turbine powered by two Foster Wheeler boilers, rated at 8,500 shaft horsepower (6,338 kW), which could propel the ship at maximum 18 knots (33 km/h). The escort carrier could carry 3,160 long tons (3,210 t) of fuel oil and had a maximum range of 27,500 nautical miles (50,930 km) at 11 knots (20 km/h) or 18,750 nautical miles (34,725 km) at maximum speed.

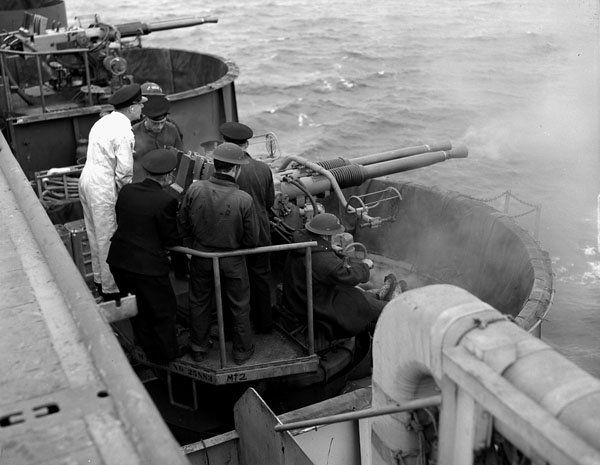
One of Nabob's twin-mounted 40 mm Bofors guns being fired during a training exercise

Aircraft operations were commanded from a small combined bridge–flight control on the starboard side of the ship. The flight deck was 450 feet (137 m) long and 80 feet (24 m) wide. The H4C hydraulic aircraft catapult was capable of launching 16,000-pound (7,257 kg) aircraft at 74 knots (137 km/h). To receive aircraft the ship was equipped with nine arrestor wires capable of taking 19,800-pound (9,000 kg) aircraft at 55 knots (102 km/h), backed up by three aircraft barriers. Two aircraft elevators accessed the below-deck hangar, with the forward elevator being 42 feet (12.8 m) long by 34 feet (10.4 m) wide and the aft elevator being 34 feet wide and 42 feet long with both capable of taking 14,000-pound (6,350 kg) aircraft. Aircraft could be housed in the 260-by-62-by-18-foot (79.2 by 18.9 by 5.5 m) hangar below the flight deck. However, the sloping contour of the hangar combined with the elevator arrangement made handling and storage of aircraft difficult and time-consuming. The escort carriers could store 3,600 imperial gallons (16,366 L; 4,323 US gal) of avgas. They had a maximum aircraft capacity of twenty-four aircraft which could be a mixture of fighter and anti-submarine (ASW) aircraft, though up to 90 could be ferried.

Armament comprised two Mark 9 5-inch (127 mm)/51 calibre guns, eight twin-mounted 40 mm Bofors guns, fourteen twin-mounted 20 mm Oerlikon cannon and seven single-mounted 20 mm Oerlikon cannon. Since the escort carriers came as part of Lend-Lease, they retained their American radar systems, with the SG 10-inch (254 mm) surface radar and the SK 1.5 cm (1 in) air search radar.

== Construction and career ==
Edisto was laid down on 20 October 1942 at the Seattle-Tacoma Shipbuilding Corp yard in Tacoma, Washington. The ship was launched on 9 March 1943. Edisto was completed and transferred under Lend-Lease to the United Kingdom on 7 September 1943 prior to her commissioning as HMS Nabob with the pennant number D77 into the Royal Navy at Tacoma. The Royal Canadian Navy (RCN) wanted to obtain experience with aircraft carriers before their acquisition of their own carriers and sought Admiralty permission to take over Nabob. However, due to Lend-Lease stipulations, the escort carrier could not be commissioned in any force but the Royal Navy. In the end a compromise was made whereby the crew would be Canadian while the vessel remained under Royal Navy control.

Following her commissioning, the ship travelled to Vancouver, to undergo modification to Royal Navy standards beginning on 1 November at Burrard Dry Dock. The conversion completed on 12 January and an arrangement was agreed upon where the crew of the ship would be drawn primarily from the RCN with the exception of the air component, which would be provided by the Fleet Air Arm. Nabob sailed to San Francisco in February under the command of Captain Nelson Lay of the RCN, where the escort carrier embarked 852 Naval Air Squadron equipped with Grumman Avenger torpedo bombers.

Intended for service as an ASW carrier, Nabob was assigned to the British Home Fleet. The ship sailed for New York City to collect a deck load of P-51 Mustangs for the United Kingdom. The mixed crew of British aircrew and engine room personnel with the rest Canadian, led to personnel issues. The entire crew received the lesser British rate of pay and used British food and disciplinary standards. This led to a near revolt among the Canadians and to desertions at a stopover at Norfolk, Virginia. This led Captain Lay to fly to Ottawa to demand Canadian standards of pay for the entire crew before the ship set sail again. His request was granted. The escort carrier arrived in British waters in April and after disembarking the aircraft, sailed to the River Clyde to undergo a refit to repair builder's defects.

Nabob returned to service on 29 June, beginning work ups with 852 Squadron and joined the Home Fleet at Scapa Flow on 1 August. 856 Naval Air Squadron joined the ship that month. In August, Nabob participated in two operations off the Norwegian coast. The first, beginning on 10 August named Operation Offspring, saw the escort carrier paired with HMS Trumpeter and HMS Indefatigable. This became the largest mining operation by the Home Fleet during the war and 47 mines were dropped between Haarhamsfjord and Lepsorev by 852 and 842 Naval Air Squadrons. One of the Avenger aircraft was shot down. The second operation was air strikes against the Tirpitz (Operation Goodwood). Nabob was a member of Force 2 during Operation Goodwood, where her Grumman Wildcats of 852 Squadron flew combat air patrol over the carrier and her Avengers of 852 and 856 Naval Air Squadrons flew anti-submarine patrols. On 22 August, while the main force attacking Tirpitz prepared for another strike, the escort carriers went to refuel the destroyers. During these operations, Nabob was torpedoed by the German submarine U-354 in the Barents Sea. The torpedo impact made a hole 32 ft^{2} (3.0 m^{2}), below the waterline on the starboard side aft. The stern sank 15 feet (4.6 m) before flooding could be controlled. Eventually the damage control parties effected enough repairs that the ship could make 10 knots (19 km/h; 12 mph). Five days later she steamed into Scapa Flow under her own power but had lost 21 men.

At Scapa Flow, emergency work was done to keep the ship afloat, but Nabob was eventually judged not worth repairing due to a lack of shipyard capacity. The escort carrier was beached and abandoned on 30 September 1944 on the south shore of the Firth of Forth, then cannibalized for other ships but retained as part of the Reserve Fleet of Rosyth Command. On 10 October 1944, Nabob was paid off at Rosyth. She was returned to United States Navy at Rosyth on 16 March 1946. Never entering US service, the ship was sold on 26 October 1946.

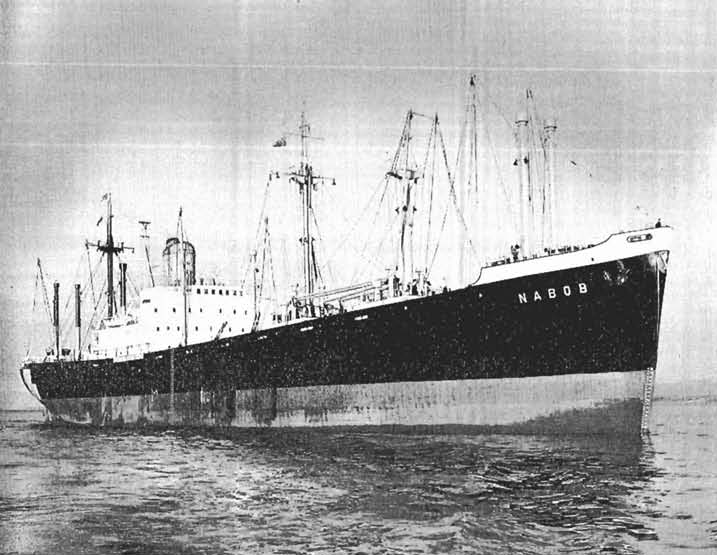
Nabob in 1964

Nabob was sold for scrapping in the Netherlands in September 1947. However, the vessel was resold and converted as the merchant Nabob of Norddeutscher Lloyd in 1951, entering service in 1952. In 1967 the ship's registry changed to Panama and the ship was renamed Glory. She was sold for scrap in Taiwan on 6 December 1977.

== See also ==
- List of aircraft carriers
