= Dorothy Coode =

Dorothy S Coode OBE
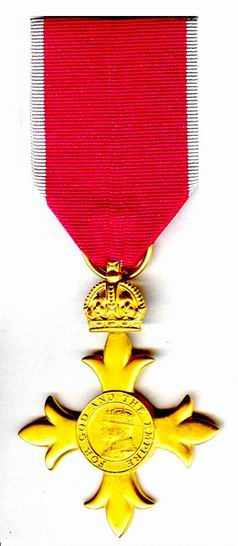
- Born: 1873; St. Austell, Cornwall, England
- Died: 1967 (aged 93–94); Gerrards Cross, Buckinghamshire, England
- Education: St. Thomas' Hospital
- Occupation: Nurse
- Known for: Leader of the nursing profession in the UK, President of the Royal College of Nursing 1935-7

Dorothy Sandys Coode OBE (c. 1873 - 1967) was a British nurse, leader of the nursing profession and President of the Royal College of Nursing.

== Early life ==
Dorothy Sandys Coode was born in 1873 in Saint Austell, Cornwall to Claudia and William Coode, a banker.

== Nursing career ==
Coode undertook her nurse training from 1899 to 1902 at St Thomas' Hospital and this included visits to Florence Nightingale. In 1903 she was appointed Nightingale Home Sister. This role included attending to the welfare of the probationers (the name given to those in training) and providing some practical training before they started their training on the wards. Coode pioneered and was the sister in charge of the first preliminary training school (PTS) at St Thomas’ Hospital under Matron Lloyd Still. In 1924 she was appointed assistant matron and retained this post until her retirement in 1933. With the outbreak of the Second World War she returned to work at St Thomas Hospital, first in the Matron's office then in charge of the Riddell House Nurses' Home. There were numerous accounts of her bravery in caring for the nurses during air raids.

Coode was active at regional and national level in the development of the nursing profession. She was elected to the first General Nursing Council 1923–1927. An active member of the College of Nursing Ltd, later the Royal College of Nursing (RCN), she was Chair of the London Region branch, then President of RCN Council (1935–1937), Vice Chair of RCN Council (1937–1940), Chair of RCN Council (1940-1946) and then RCN Vice-President from 1953 until her death in 1967. Coode contributed particularly to the Education Committee of the RCN and was influential in establishing course for industrial nurses and for International Nurses. In her RCN positions, she was a public advocate for greater proportions of trained nurses to be employed, appropriate accommodation and 56 hour per fortnight working hours as well as for a Department of Nursing in the Ministry of Health.

Coode was appointed an Officer of the Order of the British Empire (OBE) in the 1943 New Year Honours.

== Death ==
Coode died aged 94 on 3 September 1967 in Howards House, Gerrards Cross, Buckinghamshire. A memorial service was held in the chapel of St. Thomas' Hospital.
