= 856 Naval Air Squadron =

Inactive flying squadron of the Royal Navy's Fleet Air Arm

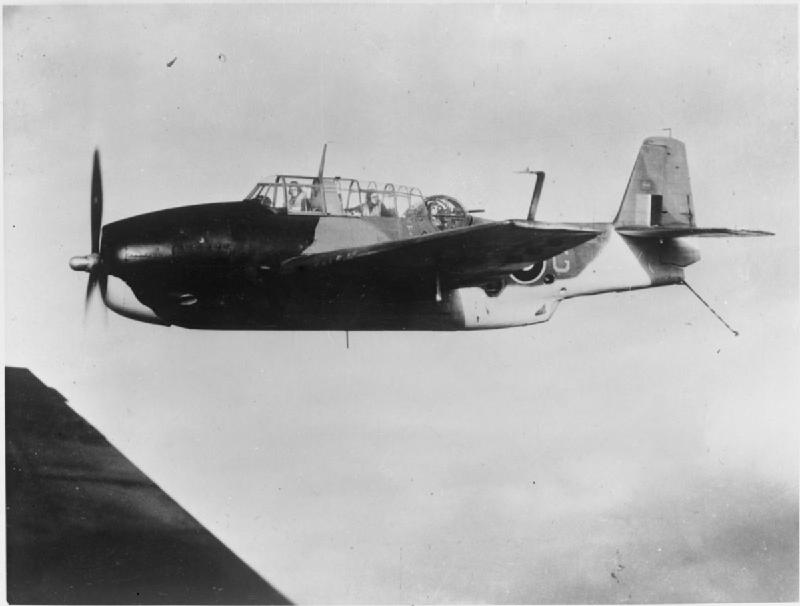
- Grumman Avenger; an example of the type used by 856 NAS
- Active: 1944–1945
- Disbanded: 15 June 1945
- Country: United Kingdom
- Branch: Royal Navy
- Type: Torpedo Bomber Reconnaissance squadron
- Role: Carrier-based: anti-submarine warfare (ASW); anti-surface warfare (ASuW); Combat air patrol (CAP)
- Size: Twelve aircraft
- Part of: Fleet Air Arm
- Home station: See Naval air stations section for full list.
- Engagements: World War II: Arctic convoys of World War II
- Battle honours: Norway 1944-45; Arctic 1945

Insignia
- Identification Markings: 6BA+ later 6A+ (Avenger); PA+ (Avenger on Premier late 1944); PS-PZ (Wildcat on Premier)

Aircraft flown
- Bomber: Grumman Avenger
- Fighter: Grumman Wildcat

856 Naval Air Squadron (856 NAS), sometimes called 856 Squadron, is an inactive Fleet Air Arm (FAA) naval air squadron of the United Kingdom’s Royal Navy (RN). It operated both Grumman Avenger torpedo bomber and Grumman Wildcat fighter aircraft between 1944 and 1945 and was last deployed on the Ruler-class escort carrier HMS Premier.

Formed at RN Air Section Squantum, Massachusetts, as a Torpedo Bomber Reconnaissance squadron in January 1944, it set sail on HMS Smiter in June, for the UK. Upon arrival, the squadron underwent anti-submarine training at airbases in Scotland and Northern Ireland, while some units were sent to Orkney, HMS Nabob, and HMS Trumpeter. They regrouped on HMS Premier in September for missions off Norway. From April to May 1945, HMS Premier escorted Arctic convoys and returned to the UK after VE-Day. The squadron was disbanded at in June 1945.

== History ==
=== Torpedo, Bomber, Reconnaissance squadron (1944–1945) ===
The squadron was officially established on 1 March 1944 at RN Air Section Squantum, which was situated at Naval Air Station Squantum, Quincy, Massachusetts, designated as a Torpedo Bomber Reconnaissance unit, equipped with twelve Grumman Avenger Mk.II torpedo bomber aircraft, which later embarked aboard the Ruler-class escort carrier, HMS Smiter on 30 June. Upon their arrival to the United Kingdom, the squadron underwent anti-submarine training at various locations, including RNAS Machrihanish (HMS Landrail), in Scotland, RNAS Maydown (HMS Shrike) and RNAS Eglinton (HMS Gannet), the latter two both County Londonderry, Northern Ireland. Additionally, detachments were deployed to RNAS Hatston (HMS Sparrowhawk ), Mainland Orkney, the Ruler-class escort carrier, HMS Nabob and sister ship, HMS Trumpeter, which facilitated their operational readiness prior to reassembling aboard another sister ship, HMS Premier on 13 September for subsequent operations in the waters off Norway.

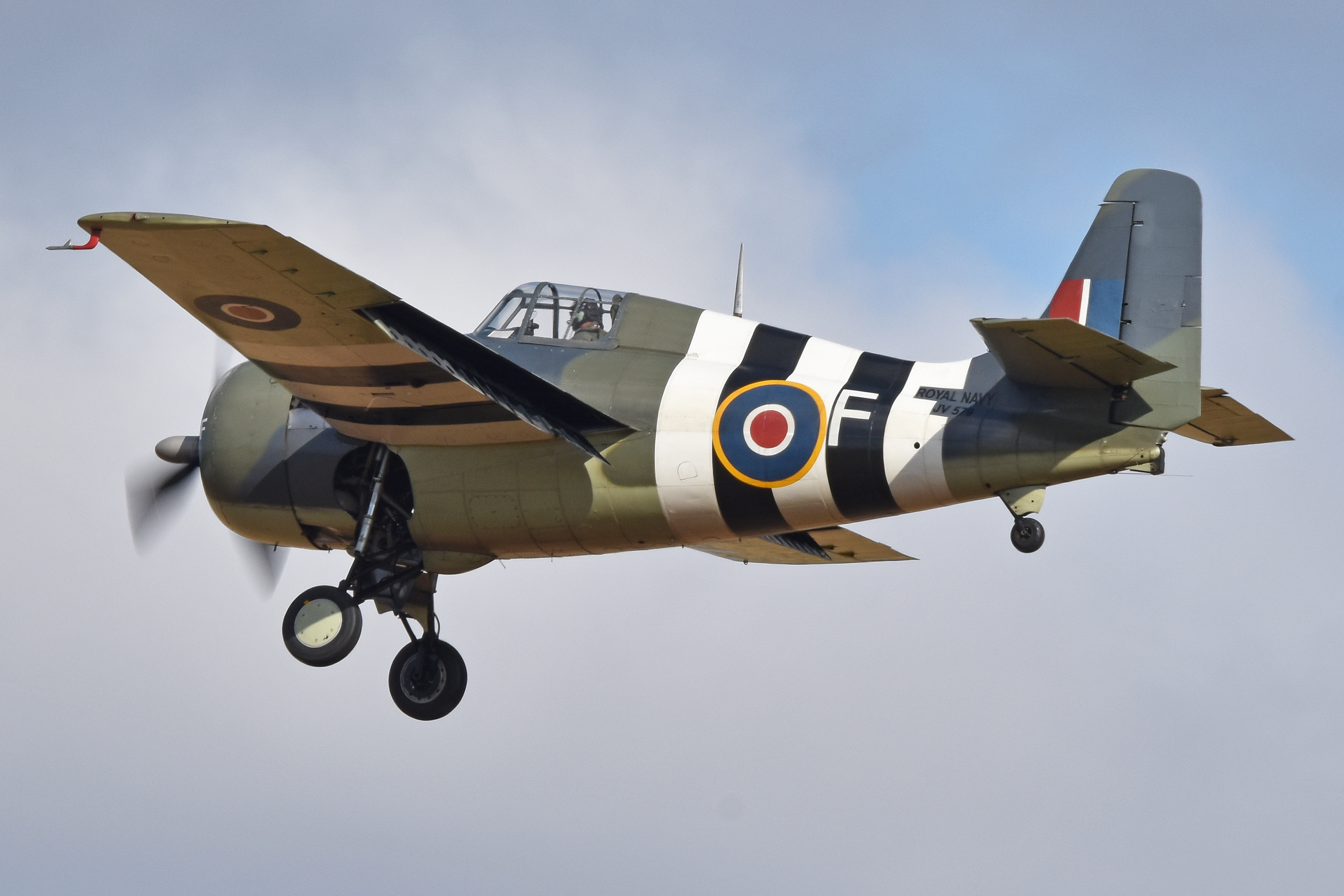
Grumman Wildcat; an example of the type used by 856 Squadron

In September, a fighter flight consisting of four Grumman Wildcat Mk VI fighter aircraft was established from 833 Naval Air Squadron, followed by the transfer of an additional four aircraft from 838 Naval Air Squadron in November. Over the subsequent six months, the squadron primarily focused on mine-laying missions along the Norwegian coastline.

In April and May 1945, HMS Premier provided escort for a North Russian convoy that included 856 Naval Air Squadron providing aerial anti-submarine patrols; however, upon its return, the conflict in Europe had concluded.

The intention to transfer 856 Naval Air Squadron to the British Pacific Fleet as a component of the 10th Carrier Air Group was ultimately abandoned, leading to the squadron’s disbandment on 15 June.

== Aircraft flown ==
The squadron has flown a couple of different aircraft types:

- Grumman Avenger Mk.II torpedo bomber (March 1944 - June 1945)
- Grumman Wildcat Mk V fighter aircraft (September - December 1944)
- Grumman Wildcat Mk VI fighter aircraft (September 1944 - May 1945)

== Battle honours ==
The following Battle Honours have been awarded to 856 Naval Air Squadron:

- Norway 1944-45
- Arctic 1945

== Naval air stations and aircraft carriers ==
856 Naval Air Squadron operated from a number of naval air stations of the Royal Navy, in the UK and overseas, and also a number of Royal Navy escort carriers:

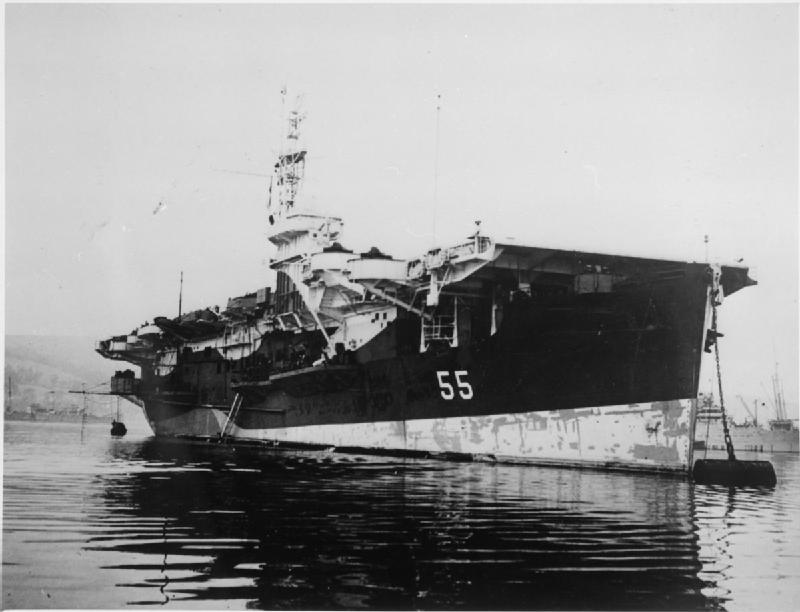
HMS Smiter

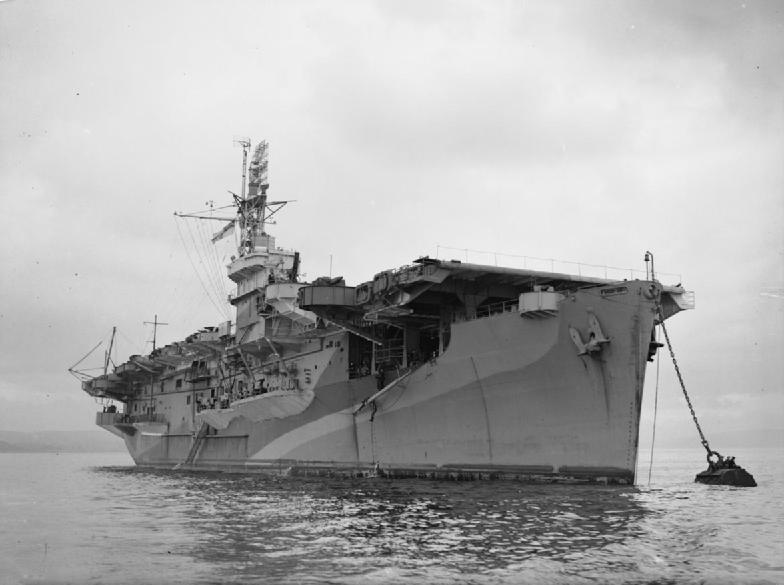
HMS Premier

- RN Air Section Squantum, Massachusetts, (1 March - 1 June 1944)
  - RN Air Section Norfolk, Virginia, (Detachment Deck Landing Training (DLT) USS Charger 11 - 17 April 1944)
- RN Air Section Norfolk, Virginia, (1 - 4 June 1944)
- HMS Smiter (4 - 21 June 1944)
- RN Air Section Speke, Merseyside, (21 - 22 June 1944)
- Royal Naval Air Station Machrihanish (HMS Landrail), Argyll and Bute, (22 June - 30 July 1944)
- Royal Naval Air Station Maydown (HMS Shrike), County Londonderry, (30 July - 12 September 1944)
- Royal Naval Air Station Eglinton (HMS Gannet), County Londonderry, (12 - 13 September 1944)
  - Royal Naval Air Section Hatston (HMS Sparrowhawk), Mainland, Orkney, (Detachment six aircraft 12 - 30 September 1944)
  - HMS Trumpeter (Detachment three aircraft 13 - 29 September 1944)
  - HMS Nabob (Detachment three aircraft 18 - 31 September 1944)
- HMS Premier (13 September - 27 November 1944)
- Royal Naval Air Station Hatston (HMS Sparrowhawk), Mainland, Orkney, (27 November - 5 December 1944)
  - HMS Trumpeter Fighter Flight (5 - 8 December 1944)
- HMS Premier (5 - 23 December 1944)
  - HMS Premier Fighter Flight 20 December 1944 - 14 January 1945)
- Royal Naval Air Station Hatston (HMS Sparrowhawk), Mainland, Orkney, (23 December 1944 - 11 January 1945)
- HMS Premier (11 - 13 January 1945)
- Royal Naval Air Station Hatston (HMS Sparrowhawk), Mainland, Orkney, (13 - 22 January 1945)
  - HMS Premier Fighter Flight (17 January - 13 February 1945)
- HMS Premier (22 - 30 January 1945)
- Royal Naval Air Station Hatston (HMS Sparrowhawk), Mainland, Orkney, (30 January - 17 February 1945)
  - HMS Premier (Detachment 5 - 13 February 1945)
- HMS Premier (17 - 23 February 1945)
- Royal Naval Air Station Hatston (HMS Sparrowhawk), Mainland, Orkney, (23 February - 6 March 1945)
- HMS Premier (6 March - 8 May 1945)
- Royal Naval Air Station Hatston (HMS Sparrowhawk), Mainland, Orkney, (8 May - 15 June 1945)
- disbanded - (15 June 1945)

== Commanding officers ==
List of commanding officers of 856 Naval Air Squadron with date of appointment:

- Lieutenant Commander(A) S.M.P. Walsh, DSC, RNVR, from 1 March 1944
- Lieutenant(A) P.S. Foulds, RNVR, from 31 December 1944
- Lieutenant Commander(A) H.C.K. Housser, RCNVR, from 15 January 1945
- disbanded - 15 June 1945

Note: Abbreviation (A) signifies Air Branch of the RN or RNVR.
