= Ronald Harris (public servant) =

British civil servant and senior Church of England layman

Portrait by Walter Bird, 1961

Sir Ronald Montague Joseph Harris, KCVO, CB (6 May 1913 – 22 January 1995) was a British civil servant and senior Church of England layman. His first career was in the Civil Service, where he was assigned to the India Office and Burma Office (1936 –1947), apart from a period during the Second World War during which he served as private secretary to Sir Edward Bridges, the Cabinet Secretary (1939–1943). After training at the Imperial Defence College, he served in HM Treasury and the Cabinet Office, with a secondment as Second Crown Estate Commissioner (1955–1960). He then left the Civil Service to work for the Church of England; he served as First Church Estates Commissioner from 1969 and additionally chairman of the Central Board of Finance of Church of England from 1978, until he retired in 1982.

== Honours ==
In the 1943 New Year Honours, Harris was appointed Member of the Royal Victorian Order (MVO). In the 1956 Queen's Birthday Honours, he was appointed Companion of the Order of the Bath (CB) in recognition of his recent work as under-secretary in the Cabinet Office. In the 1960 Queen's Birthday Honours, he was promoted to Knight Commander of the Royal Victorian Order (KCVO), and therefore granted the title sir.
