= Robert Crosby =

Robert Crosby may refer to:

- Robert A. Crosby (1896–1947), rodeo competitor
- Robert B. Crosby (1911–2000), governor of Nebraska
- Bob Crosby (1913–1993), American jazz singer and bandleader
- Rob Crosby (born 1954), American country music artist
- Bobby Crosby (born 1980), American baseball player

== See also ==
- Robert Crosbie (disambiguation)
