= Horatio Nelson Lay (admiral) =

Canadian Navy admiral (1903–1988)

Rear Admiral Horatio Nelson Lay
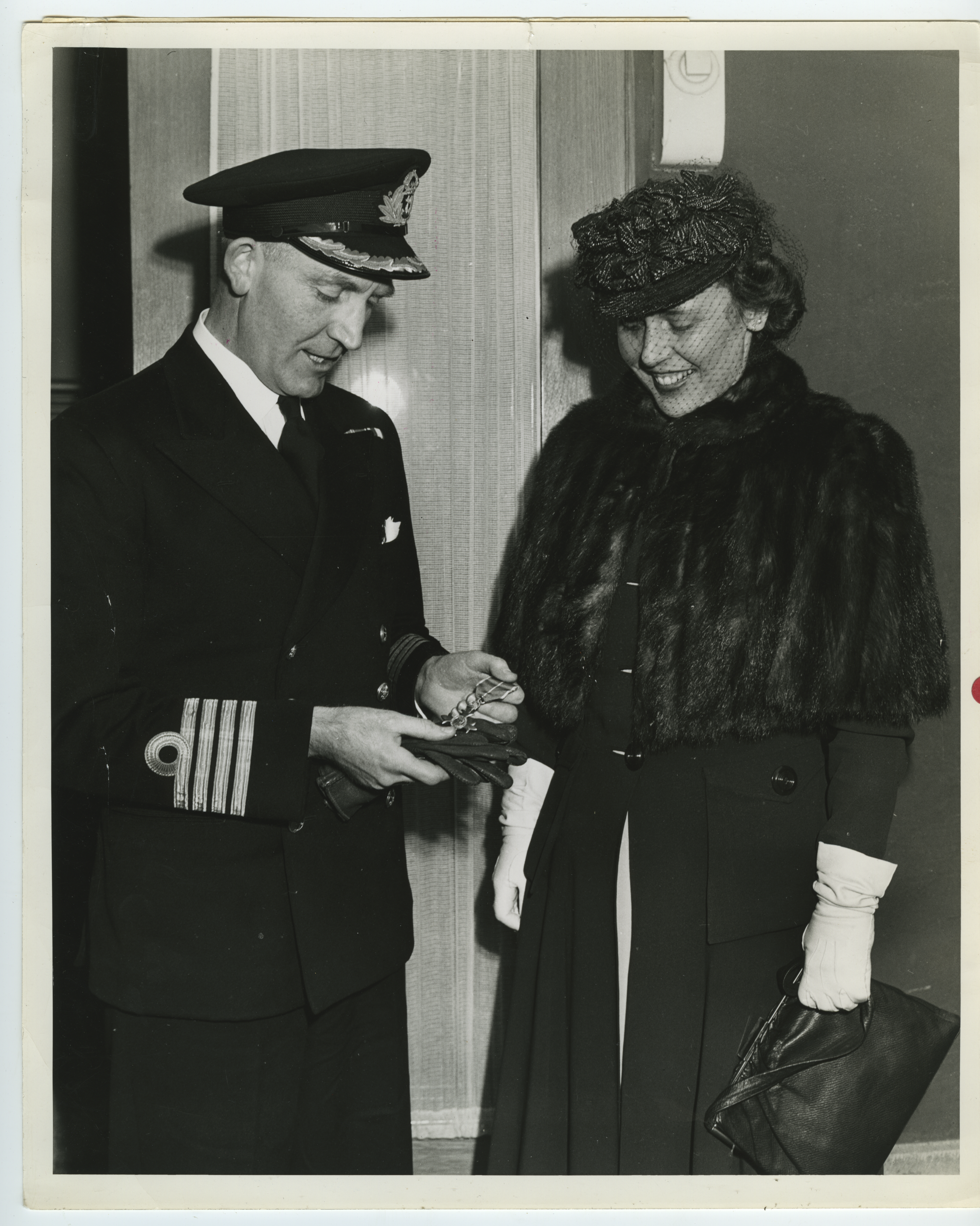
- Born: 23 January 1903; Skagway, Alaska
- Died: May 8, 1988 (aged 85); Perth, Ontario
- Military career
- Allegiance: Canada
- Branch: Royal Canadian Navy
- Service years: 1918–1958
- Rank: Rear-Admiral
- Conflicts: Second World War: Battle of the Atlantic
- Awards: Order of the British Empire

Rear-Admiral Horatio Nelson Lay OBE (23 January 1903 in Skagway, District of Alaska, United States – 1988 in Perth, Ontario) was a naval officer of the Royal Canadian Navy.

== Career ==
=== Early career ===
In 1918 he was a Naval Cadet at the Royal Naval College of Canada. In 1921 he was made a midshipman and assigned to the battleship HMS Resolution for training. His next assignment was to HMS Cloud in 1923 for more training.

In 1924 he was sent to the Royal Naval College, Greenwich and RN Barracks Portsmouth for sub-lieutenant courses. His next assignments were to the destroyer HMCS Patrician in 1925. He transferred to the battlecruiser HMS Tiger for big ship experience prior to a torpedo course in 1927. Lay was assigned to the battlecruiser HMS Repulse for further experience in 1928. In 1929, Lay was sent to HMS Vernon for the Long Torpedo Officers Course. He was then made Torpedo Officer Atlantic Coast in 1930.

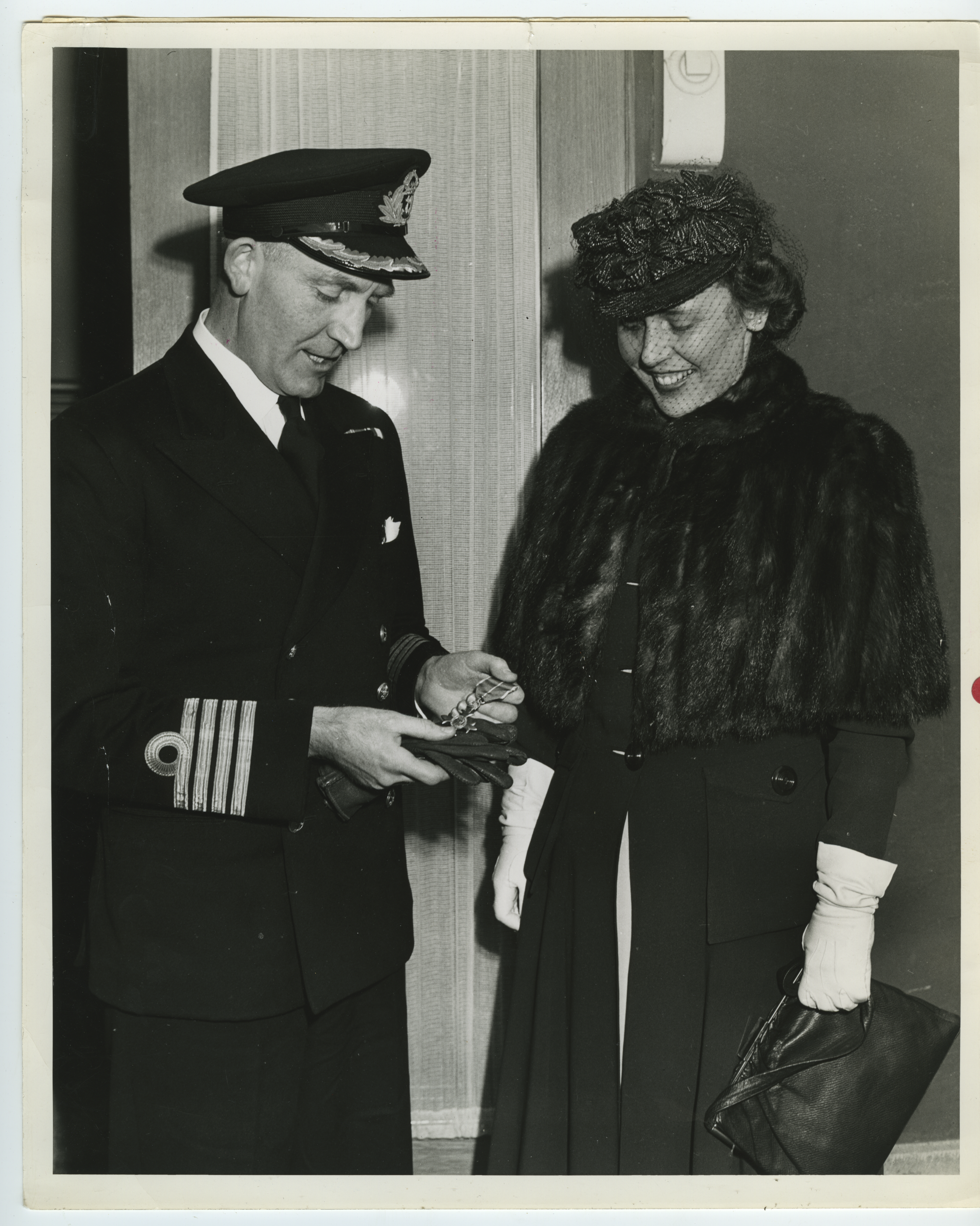
Acting Captain Horatio Nelson Lay and Mrs. Lay after recent investiture at Gouvernment House in Ottawa

In 1931 Lay was assigned to the destroyer HMCS Skeena. In 1933, he was made Torpedo Officer Pacific Coast. Lay was assigned to the destroyer HMCS Vancouver as first lieutenant in 1934. Lay was returned to Torpedo Officer Pacific Coast in 1937. He was then sent on a Royal Naval Staff course in 1938.

=== Second World War ===
He became the first Commanding Officer of the minesweeper HMCS Gaspe from 12 January 1939 to 17 August 1939 and as Staff Officer Operations to Commanding Officer Atlantic Coast. His next command was as Commanding Officer of the destroyer HMCS Restigouche from 26 December 1939 to 23 June 1941. He was then made Director of Operations from June 1941 to October 1943.

He was the only Canadian Commanding Officer of the escort carrier HMS Nabob (a Royal Navy ship crewed by Canadians), from 15 October 1943 until severely damaged by the German submarine U-354 on 22 August 1944. Twenty-one crew were killed in the attack. Nabob was paid off on 30 September 1944, beached and finally scrapped in 1977.

He was next sent to Canadian Naval Mission Overseas London for negotiations with the Royal Navy for aircraft carriers in 1945. Lay was then sent to the US Army/US Navy Staff College and to Naval Service HQ as Director of Plans and Naval Intelligence.

=== Cold War and civilian life ===
In 1948 Lay became Acting Commodore and sent to Naval HQ as Assistant Chief of Naval Staff (Plans and Air). The following year he was made Canadian Naval Attache Washington and Naval member of the Canadian Joint Liaison Staff. In 1952, Lay was assigned to Naval HQ as Assistant Chief of Naval Staff (Warfare) and made a member of the Naval Board of Canada. He was promoted to rear admiral and assigned to Naval HQ as Vice-Chief of Naval Staff and as Chief of the Naval Staff in 1954, serving until his retirement in 1958.

After retirement, he was active in the Ottawa United Appeal from 1958 to 1972.

== Awards ==
- Order of the British Empire (OBE) - "For gallantry and distinguished services before the enemy. This Officer was in command of one of HMC Destroyers engaged in convoy and other duties in United Kingdom waters in the early part of the war, and assisted in the evacuations from France. As Senior Officer of a convoy escort group in the Atlantic over a considerable period, his keenness and efficiency were an inspiration to those serving under his command."
- Mention in Despatches - "For good service when his ship HMS Nabob was damaged." "For courage, resolution and skill in Northern waters (London Gazette Citation)."
