= Leslie Gordon Phillips =

British Army general

Major-General Sir Leslie Gordon Phillips KBE CB MC
- Phillips in 1946
- Born: 11 February 1892
- Died: 19 March 1966 (aged 74)
- Military career
- Allegiance: United Kingdom
- Branch: British Army
- Service years: 1911–1946
- Rank: Major-General
- Service number: 4552
- Units: Worcestershire Regiment; Royal Corps of Signals
- Conflicts: First World War; Second World War
- Awards: KBE; CB; MC

Major-General Sir Leslie Gordon Phillips KBE CB MC (11 February 1892 – 19 March 1966) was a senior British Army officer during the Second World War.

== Military career ==
Born on 11 February 1892, Leslie Gordon Phillips was educated at Bedford School and at Royal Military College, Sandhurst. He received his first commission in the Worcestershire Regiment as a second lieutenant in September 1911 and served in France and Belgium during the First World War.

He joined the Royal Corps of Signals in 1920 and served in Waziristan between 1936 and 1937.

Promoted to the rank of major general in 1940, he served during the Second World War and was Signal Officer in Chief, Home Forces, between 1941 and 1943. He was Director of Signals at the War Office between 1943 and 1946.

Major General Sir Leslie Gordon Phillips was invested as a Companion of the Order of the Bath in 1943, and as a Knight Commander of the Order of the British Empire in 1946. He retired from the British Army in 1946 and died on 19 March 1966.

== Bibliography ==
- Smart, Nick (2005). Biographical Dictionary of British Generals of the Second World War. Barnesley: Pen & Sword. ISBN 1844150496.
