= Robert Edward Harold Crosbie =

- Born: 20 April 1897; London, England
- Died: 23 May 1978 (aged 81)
- Occupations: Spiritualist; author

Robert Edward Harold Crosbie (1886–1950) was a high-ranking official in the Mandatory Palestine between 1921 and 1948, the end of the British Mandatory, except for the years 1926–1928 in which he was sent as a government secretary to the Transjordan region.

On 15 June 1925 he was nominated as the assistant district commissioner for the Southern District and was highly involved in the life and administration of the local people.

After the 1929 Palestine riots he helped introduce income tax to Palestine, in order to alleviating the burden on Arab peasants . For many years he resisted transferring the Jewish neighborhoods of dominantly Arab Jaffa to Tel Aviv, as this was considered by him to be a blow on the pride of the Arabs of Jaffa

At age 61 he was retired from service to a suburb of London.
