= Ken Lee (RAF officer) =

British WWII flying ace (1915–2008)

Kenneth Lee
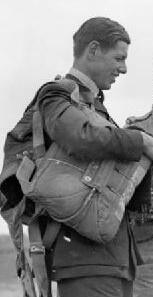
- Lee at Bétheniville in France, 1940
- Born: 23 June 1915; Birmingham, England
- Died: 15 January 2008 (aged 92); Sheffield, England
- Military career
- Allegiance: United Kingdom
- Branch: Royal Air Force
- Service years: 1939–1945
- Rank: Squadron Leader
- Nickname: 'Hawkeye'
- Units: No. 501 Squadron; No. 260 Squadron
- Commands: No. 123 Squadron
- Conflicts: Second World War: Battle of France; Battle of Britain; Western Desert campaign
- Awards: Distinguished Flying Cross; Mention in Despatches

Kenneth Norman Thomson Lee DFC (23 June 1915 – 15 January 2008) was a British flying ace who served with the Royal Air Force (RAF) during the Second World War. He is credited with having shot down seven aircraft.

From Birmingham, Lee joined the Royal Air Force Volunteer Reserve in early 1937 and was called up to serve in the RAF in early 1939 for a six-month period, mostly with No. 43 Squadron and then staying on even after his obligations ended. Posted to No. 501 Squadron on the outbreak of the Second World War. It went to France with its Hawker Hurricane fighters on 10 May 1940, Lee claiming his first aerial victory the same day. Several more followed in the next few weeks although he was shot down on 10 June and was injured during the subsequent efforts to be repatriated to England. Rejoining the squadron after recovery from his injury, Lee had further successes during the Battle of Britain until he was shot down on 18 August. Wounded, he did not return to operational flying until October and later in the month was awarded the Distinguished Flying Cross.

At the end of the year he was placed on instructing duties for 12 months, before going to Africa where he was a ferry pilot until mid-1942. He served with a number of squadrons in Egypt before being appointed leader of No. 123 Squadron in March 1943. He was shot down over Crete on 23 July, and spent the remainder of the war as a prisoner of war. He left the RAF in late 1945 and worked in East Africa for a trading company for several years before setting a plumbing supplies business in Dublin. He retired in 1977 and eventually settled in Sheffield, England, where he died in 2008, aged 92.

== Early life ==
Kenneth Norman Thomson Lee was born on 23 June 1915 in the city of Birmingham, in England. He was educated locally, at King Edward VI High School and after entering the workforce, found employment as a technician in a paint factory. In early 1937, Lee joined the Royal Air Force Volunteer Reserve (RAFVR) and spent two months at No. 11 Elementary & Reserve Flying Training School (E&RFTS) in Perth. He returned to his employer in April, but would fly weekends at No. 9 E&RFTS at Ansty.

In January 1939 Lee was called up for a six-month period of service in the Royal Air Force and posted to No. 111 Squadron. His new unit was based at Northolt and equipped with the Hawker Hurricane fighter. After a few weeks there Lee was commissioned as a pilot officer and then transferred to No. 43 Squadron. Like his previous unit, this was equipped with Hurricanes but was based at Tangmere. He remained here for several months, even after his initial service period obligation ended.

== Second World War ==
In September 1939, Lee was posted to No. 501 Squadron. At the time, the squadron was based at Filton and operated Hawker Hurricane fighters as part of the aerial defences around Bristol. In November, it moved south to Tangmere but saw little activity for the next few months.

=== Battle of France ===
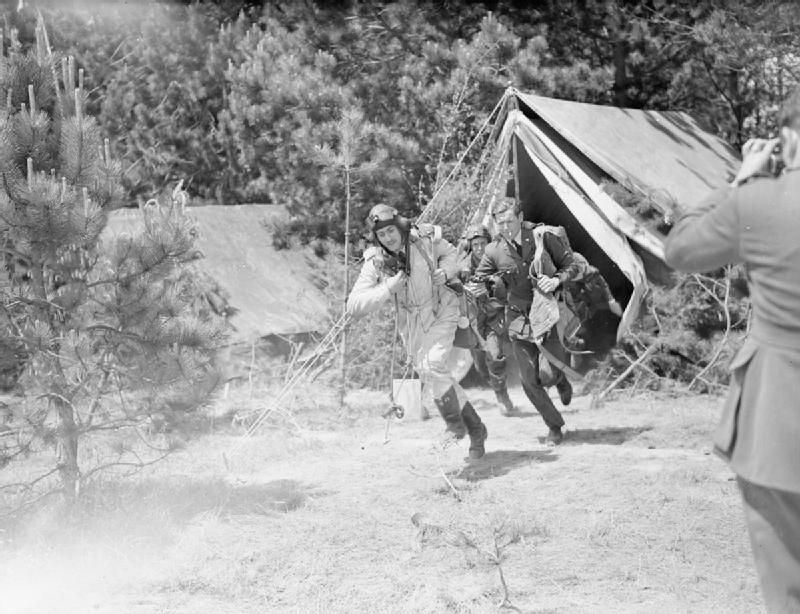
Pilots of No. 501 Squadron being scrambled from the airfield at Bétheniville, May 1940

Following the German invasion of France and the Low Countries that commenced on 10 May 1940, No. 501 Squadron was immediately sent to France and began operating from Bétheniville. It was promptly in action. Lee, who acquired the nickname 'Hawkeye' on account of his apparent excellent eyesight, shot down a Messerschmitt Bf 110 heavy fighter over Sedan. On 12 May he destroyed a Dornier Do 17 medium bomber near the Belgian border and this was followed by his destruction of another Bf 110 over Le Chesne the next day. He shot down a Heinkel He 111 medium bomber near Blagny on 27 May and a Do 17 in the vicinity of Boos on 6 June. Lee's Hurricane was damaged in an engagement with He 111s on 10 June and he had to bale out of his aircraft. He landed at Le Mans and although he was repatriated to England, he suffered an injury to his hand which took him off operational flying for some weeks.

Meanwhile, No. 501 Squadron had retreated into the southwest of France as the Germans advanced. On 18 June, the squadron's surviving Hurricanes were flown from Dinard to St Helier on the island of Jersey. From here, it provided aerial cover for the evacuation of the British Expeditionary Force from Cherbourg and then flew on to Croydon, where it reassembled on 21 June.

=== Battle of Britain ===
At Croydon, No. 501 Squadron received reinforcements and replacement Hurricanes and in July, Lee rejoined the unit. As part of No. 11 Group, the squadron was soon drawn into the aerial fighting over the southeast of England as the Battle of Britain commenced. As the Luftwaffe's campaign progressed, the squadron, which was now based at Gravesend was scrambled multiple times a day to intercept incoming raids. On 29 July, Lee damaged a Junkers Ju 87 dive bomber near Dover and 12 August destroyed another, over The Downs. Nearly a week later, on 18 August, he was shot down himself, by the flying ace Gerhard Schöpfel who destroyed four RAF fighters that day. Lee baled out of his Hurricane but had been struck in the leg by Schöpfel's gunfire. Coming down near Whitstable and despite his wounds, he was taken by soldiers to a local golf club for a drink.

Lee was again off operational flying as a result, not returning to duty until October. In the meantime, he had been promoted to flying officer. Later in October it was formally announced that Lee was to be awarded the Distinguished Flying Cross (DFC). The citation for the DFC was published in The London Gazette and read:

This officer has led his section and flight with marked success. He has displayed great dash and determination and has destroyed at least six enemy aircraft.

— London Gazette, No. 34976, 22 October 1940

=== Later war service ===
In late November, Lee was posted to the Special Duties Flight at Stormy Down where he was expected to fly Supermarine Spitfire fighters for Rolls Royce on high altitude tests. However, when it was discovered he had no experience on the type he was sent to No. 52 Operational Training Unit at Crosby-on-Eden as an instructor where he would remain for several months. He was mentioned in despatches in the 1941 New Year Honours, and later in the year was promoted to flight lieutenant.

In December 1941 Lee was briefly posted to No. 79 Squadron before being subsequently assigned to ferrying duties, flying aircraft from Takoradi, in what is now Ghana, to Cairo. In mid-1942, he was posted to No. 112 Squadron; this was based in Egypt and operating the Curtis Kittyhawk in a fighter-bomber role. His period of service with this unit was curtailed after he contracted Dengue fever. In September, having recovered his health, was sent to No. 260 Squadron as a flight commander. Also based in Egypt, this was operating Kittyhawks mostly as a bomber escort and rarely encountered opposition. However Lee destroyed a Macchi MC.202 fighter over Libya on 10 November.

Lee was given his first command, No. 123 Squadron, in March 1943 as an acting squadron leader. The squadron, operating Hurricanes, was based in Abadan in Iran as part of the defences for the oil fields there. In May Lee took the squadron to Bu Amud in Egypt and it was involved in convoy patrols. On 23 July, he was shot down over German-occupied Crete while flying in 'Operation Thesis', a major sortie involving over a hundred Hurricanes on a strafing mission. He became a prisoner of war and was held in Stalag Luft III. He was one of the POWs who helped distribute the dirt excavated from the escape tunnels that were constructed to facilitate the Great Escape of 1944 from the camp. The camp was evacuated in January 1945 to prevent the POWs from being liberated by the approaching Russian Army. Lee was eventually freed in May and was repatriated to England. He ended the war credited with having shot down seven aircraft and damaging one more.

== Later life ==
Rather than remain in the RAF in the postwar period, Lee resigned his commission in December but was able to retain his acting squadron leader rank. Returning to civilian life, Lee was employed by the United Africa Company, a trading business based in Tanganyika Territory, in East Africa. Around 1955, he visited Dublin, in Ireland, on a holiday and decided to settle there. He formed a plumbing supplies business which he sold in 1977. Retiring to Spain, he worked as a consultant before returning to the United Kingdom in 1995, settling in Sheffield. He died there on 15 January 2008.
