= James Harry Lacey =

British fighter pilot (1917–1989)

- "Ginger" Lacey, May 1941
- Born: 1 February 1917; Wetherby, West Riding of Yorkshire, England
- Died: 30 May 1989 (aged 72); Bridlington, East Riding of Yorkshire, England
- Military career
- Allegiance: United Kingdom
- Branch: Royal Air Force
- Service years: 1937–1967
- Rank: Squadron Leader
- Nickname: "Ginger"
- Units: 501 Squadron (1939–41); No. 57 Operational Training Unit (1941); 602 Squadron (1942); No. 81 Group (1942); No. 1 Special Attack Instructors School (1942); 20 Squadron (1943); 1572 Gunnery Flight (1943); 155 Squadron (1944)
- Commands: 17 Squadron (1944–46)
- Conflicts: Second World War: Battle of France; Battle of Britain; Circus offensive; Burma campaign (1944–1945)
- Awards: Distinguished Flying Medal & Bar; Mentioned in Despatches; Croix de guerre (France)
- Other work: Owner of a cargo air carrier flight instructor

James Harry Lacey, DFM & Bar (1 February 1917 – 30 May 1989), known as Ginger Lacey, was a British flying ace who served with the Royal Air Force (RAF) during the Second World War. He was credited with having shot down at least twenty-eight aircraft, one of the RAF's most successful fighter pilots of the war.

From Yorkshire, Lacey joined the Royal Air Force Volunteer Reserve in 1937. Called up for service in the RAF on the outbreak of the Second World War in 1939, he was posted to 501 Squadron. He flew the Hawker Hurricane fighter extensively during the Battle of France and the Battle of Britain. During this time, he achieved the majority of his aerial victories and was twice awarded the Distinguished Flying Medal and was also mentioned in despatches. In January 1941 he was commissioned and after a period of instructing duties in mid-1941, he briefly served with 602 Squadron.

Lacey later commanded fighter squadrons in the Far East and claimed his final aerial victory of the war in February 1945. In the postwar period, he remained in the RAF and spent much of his career as a fighter controller. Retiring from military service in 1967 as an honorary squadron leader, he later established an air freight business and worked as a flying instructor at an aviation club. He died in 1989 at the age of 72.

== Early life ==
James Harry Lacey was born on 1 February 1917 in Wetherby, West Yorkshire. His father wanted him to pursue a career in farming but once he completed his education at King James Grammar School, in Knaresborough, Lacey worked as an apprentice pharmacist. He was also interested in engines and aviation, so he studied at Leeds Technical College.

Lacey, who went on to be known as 'Ginger' during the course of his flying career, joined the Royal Air Force Volunteer Reserve (RAFVR) in January 1937 as a trainee pilot at Perth, Scotland, where he underwent his flying training at No. 11 Elementary and Reserve Flying School (E&RFTS). The first in his class to fly solo, he subsequently trained at No. 4 E&RFTS at Brough Aerodrome. In 1938, he became an instructor at the Yorkshire Flying School, going on to accumulate 1,000 hours of flight time but also having at least one accident in one of the school's aircraft. In January 1939, he commenced a six-week attachment with the Royal Air Force (RAF), flying for 1 Squadron.

== Second World War ==
On the outbreak of the Second World War Lacey was called up for active service in the RAF and posted to 501 Squadron. At the time, the squadron was based at Filton and operated Hawker Hurricane fighters as part of the aerial defences around Bristol. In November, it moved south to Tangmere but saw little activity for the next few months.

=== Battle of France ===
Following the the German invasions of France and the Low Countries, that commenced on 10 May 1940, 501 Squadron was immediately sent to France and began operating from Bétheniville the next day, 11 May. Lacey flew his first sortie two days later, on 13 May. A fault on his aircraft prevented him from taking off with the rest of the squadron, and he was unable to catch up with it once he was airborne. He then sighted a Heinkel He 111 medium bomber over Sedan but an escorting Messerschmitt Bf 109 fighter intercepted him. After destroying the Bf 109, he then engaged and shot down the He 111. On return to his airfield, his claims were treated with skepticism until they were confirmed by a French anti-aircraft unit. Scrambled again later in the day, he destroyed a Messerschmitt Bf 110 heavy fighter near La Chesne.

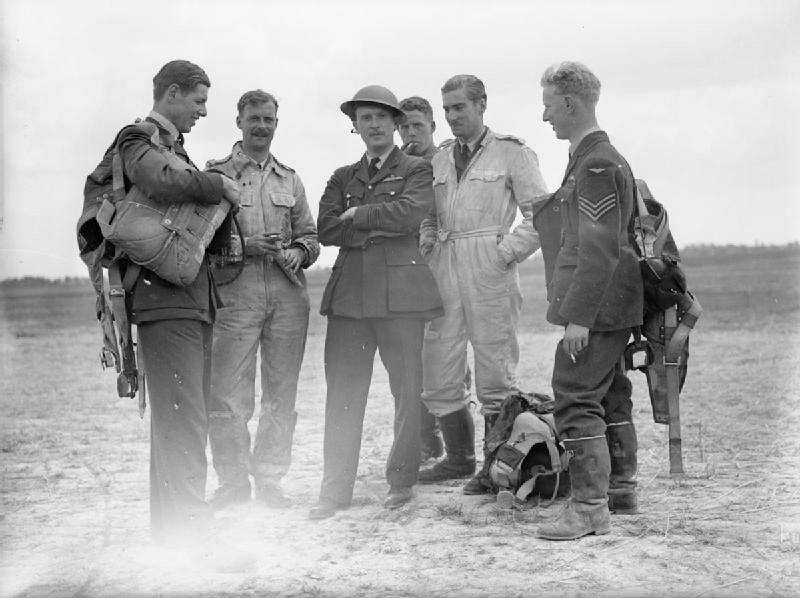
Lacey stands on the far right of this group of pilots of 501 Squadron at Bétheniville, 1940

Over the following two weeks, 501 Squadron began to retreat into the southwest of France as the Germans advanced. On 27 May Lacey destroyed two more He 111s in the Blagny-Abancourt area. His aircraft was damaged in combat on 9 June and he crash landed in a swamp. Fumes from leaking petrol caused him to lose consciousness but he was rescued by locals and taken for medical treatment. On 18 June, the surviving Hurricanes of 501 Squadron were flown from Dinard to St Helier on the island of Jersey. From here, it provided aerial cover for the evacuation of the British Expeditionary Force from Cherbourg and then flew on to Croydon, where it reassembled on 21 June. As a result of his successes in France, Lacey was awarded the French Croix de Guerre.

=== Battle of Britain ===
At Croydon, 501 Squadron received reinforcements and replacement Hurricanes but as part of 11 Group, it was soon drawn into the fighting over the southeast of England as the Battle of Britain commenced. As the Luftwaffe's campaign progressed, the squadron, which was now based at Gravesend was scrambled several times a day to intercept raids. Lacey's first aerial victory of the battle was on 20 July, when he shot down a Bf 109 to the north of Sark. He then shot down one Junkers Ju 87 dive bomber and probably destroyed a second near The Downs on 12 August. In another sortie the same day, he engaged a Bf 110 near Manston and he was credited with its probable destruction. The following day he engaged a He 111 but after his aircraft was hit by return fire, had to bail out. He damaged a Dornier Do 17 medium bomber over Kent on 15 August, and the next day probably shot down a Bf 109 near Dungeness. On 23 August, Lacey was awarded the Distinguished Flying Medal (DFM). The citation for the DFM was published in The London Gazette and read,

Sergeant Lacey has taken part in numerous patrols against the enemy. He has displayed great determination and coolness in combat, and has destroyed six enemy aircraft.

— London Gazette, No. 34929, 23 August 1940

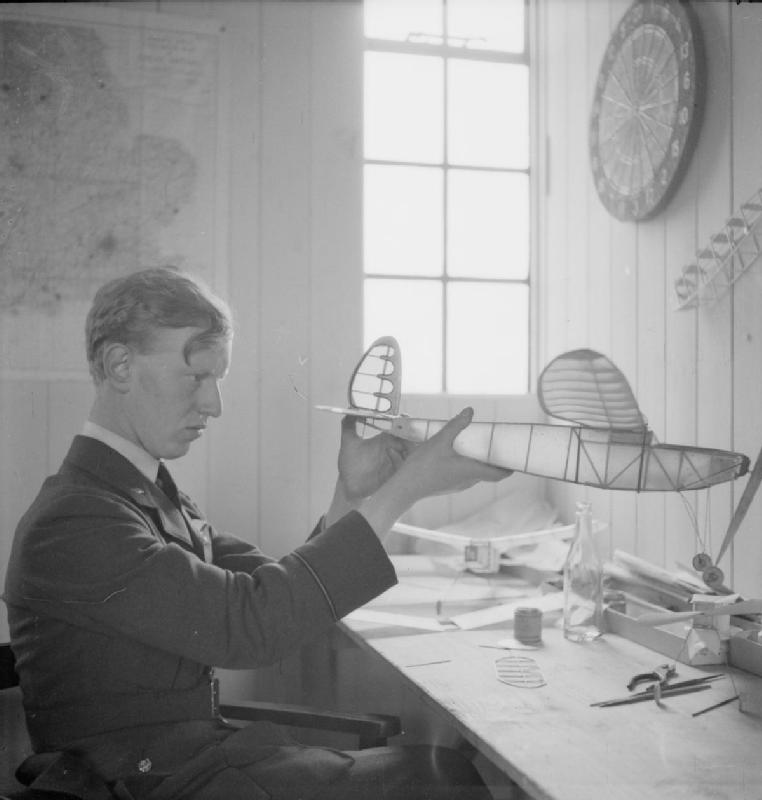
Lacey works on a model aeroplane in 501 Squadron's dispersal hut at Colerne on 30 May 1941

On 24 August Lacey flew eight sorties. On the second of these he shot down a Junkers Ju 88 medium bomber over Ramsgate and damaged a Do 17. The engine of his Hurricane was damaged in the fourth sortie and he landed at Lympne for it to be repaired. He destroyed a Bf 109 near Hawkinge on 29 August and the next day during combat over the Thames Estuary, he shot down an He 111 and damaged a Bf 110. His Hurricane was badly hit by enemy fire. His engine stopped and he decided to glide back to the airfield at Gravesend in his stricken aircraft, rather than bail out into the Thames Estuary. On the last day of the month, he destroyed a Bf 109 over Hornchurch. On 2 September, Lacey shot down two Bf 109s and damaged a Do 17. He then shot down another two Bf 109s over the Isle of Sheppey on 5 September. During a heavy raid on 13 September, he engaged a formation of He 111s over London where he shot down one of the aircraft that had just bombed Buckingham Palace. As he could not find his airfield in the worsening visibility, he then bailed out of his aircraft, sustaining slight injuries.

Returning to the action shortly thereafter, Lacey shot down an He 111 and two Bf 109s, and damaged another on 15 September, one of the most severe days of fighting during the whole battle, which later became known as "Battle of Britain Day". During the battle he attacked a formation of twelve Bf 109s, shooting down two before the others had noticed and then escaping into cloud. Two days later on 17 September, he was shot down over Ashford, Kent, during a dogfight with several Bf 109s and bailed out without injury. On 27 September, he destroyed a Bf 109 to the north of Maidstone and damaged a Ju 88 in the vicinity of Brooklands on 30 September. During October the squadron's pace of operations waned as the Luftwaffe switched to night bombing but Lacey claimed a Bf 109 as probably destroyed near West Malling on 7 October, shot down a Bf 109 to the south of Rye on 12 October, and another near Beachy Head on 26 October. Four days later, on 30 October, he destroyed a Bf 109 before damaging another near Maidstone.

His successes of 30 October were Lacey's final aerial victories of the Battle of Britain. He was the highest scoring fighter pilot of his squadron and the second most successful RAF fighter pilot of the Battle of Britain. During the campaign over the southeast of England and in the preceding Battle of France, he had been shot down or forced to land due to combat no less than nine times. On 26 November, Lacey was awarded a Bar to his DFM for his outstanding courage and bravery during the Battle of Britain. The citation in the London Gazette read,

Sergeant Lacey has shown consistent efficiency and great courage. He has led his section on many occasions and his splendid qualities as a fighter pilot have enabled him to destroy at least 19 enemy aircraft.

— London Gazette, No. 35001, 26 November 1940

Lacey's final award for outstanding service during 1940 was a Mention in Despatches, announced on 1 January 1941. He was commissioned a pilot officer (on probation) later in the month, on 25 January, with seniority backdated to 15 January.

=== Circus offensive ===
By this time, 501 Squadron was back at Filton and in April it began to re-equip with the Supermarine Spitfire fighter. Soon afterwards it commenced sorties to German-occupied France as part of Fighter Command's Circus offensive. On 10 July Lacey, having been promoted to acting flight lieutenant the previous month, was flying as "A" flight leader when he shot down a Bf 109 to the northeast of Cherbourg. He damaged another Bf 109 over Cherbourg four days later. On 17 July, he claimed a Heinkel He 59 seaplane shot down 10 mi (16 km) to the south of Portland. On 24 July, while on a sortie to Brest Harbour, Lacey was strafing German shipping when two Bf 109s attacked him. He was able to evade his attackers who subsequently collided; he was credited with their destruction.

=== Later war service ===
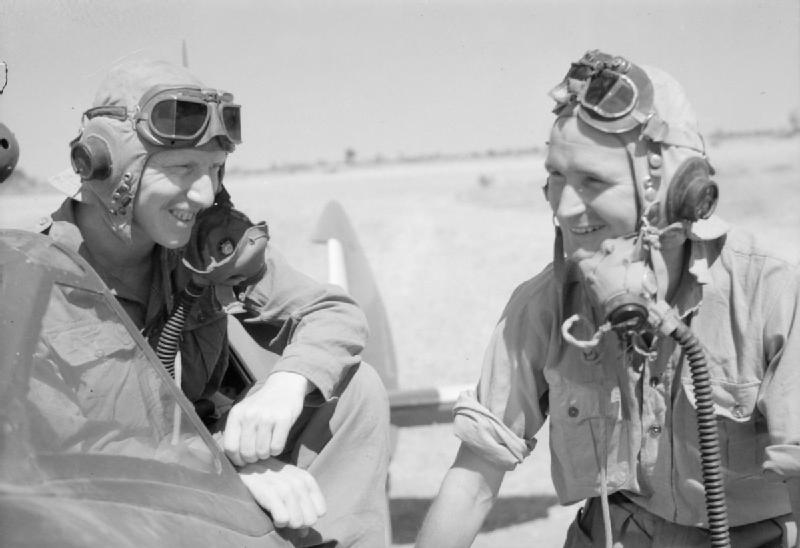
Lacey, on the left, with his wingman at Ywadon, Burma, February 1945

Posted away from combat operations in August, Lacey served as a flight instructor with No. 57 Operational Training Unit for several months. During this time his substantive rank was made up to flying officer. In March 1942, Lacey returned to operations with a posting to 602 Squadron. Based at Kenley and flying the Spitfire Mk V, this was regularly flying offensive sorties as part of the Kenley fighter wing. On 24 March Lacey engaged a Focke Wulf 190 fighter in the vicinity of Gravelines and claimed it as damaged. He is credited with damaging another Fw 190 on 25 April before receiving a posting to the headquarters of No. 81 Group as a tactics officer. Promoted to war substantive flight lieutenant on 27 August, in November he was posted as Chief Instructor at No. 1 Special Attack Instructors School, Milfield.

In late March 1943, Lacey was given an operational posting, at 20 Squadron. This was based at Peshawar, in India, flying Hurricane Mk IIDs. Later in the year Lacey joined 1572 Gunnery Flight when he helped convert flying personnel from Bristol Blenheim light bombers to Hurricanes and then to the P-47 Thunderbolt fighter. In November, Lacey was posted to 155 Squadron flying the Spitfire Mk VIII but his tenure there was brief; later in the month, he was given command of 17 Squadron. Equipped with the Spitfire Mk VIII LF, it was based at Sapam performing escort duties during the final months of the Burma campaign and from early 1945, now operating from Burma, was also engaged in ground support operations. Lacey claimed his last aerial victory on 19 February 1945, when he shot down a Japanese Army Air Force Nakajima Ki 43 "Oscar" fighter several miles to the south of Mandalay, using only nine 20 mm cannon rounds. It was the only occasion he engaged a Japanese aircraft.

When the Second World War ended, 17 Squadron was at Madura and preparing for the redundant invasion of Malaya. Lacey, still in command, was one of the few RAF pilots on operational duties on both the opening and closing day of the war. He is credited with the destruction of 28 aircraft, five probably destroyed and nine damaged.

== Postwar ==
After the war was over, Lacey went to Japan with 17 Squadron aboard the aircraft carrier HMS Vengeance, becoming the first Spitfire pilot to fly over Japan on 30 April 1946. Now married, he returned to the United Kingdom in May 1946. His wife, Sheila, had been serving in the Women's Royal Naval Service and the couple were married in India the previous year. They would had three daughters. Remaining in RAF service, Lacey received a permanent commission in the rank of flight lieutenant on 8 December 1948, with seniority from 1 September 1945. Lacey subsequently flew de Havilland Vampire jet fighters from Odiham and was later a fighter controller in Hong Kong and in Borneo at Kuching and Labuan. Lacey retired from the RAF on 5 March 1967 as a flight lieutenant but was conferred with the honorary rank of squadron leader.

== Later life and legacy ==
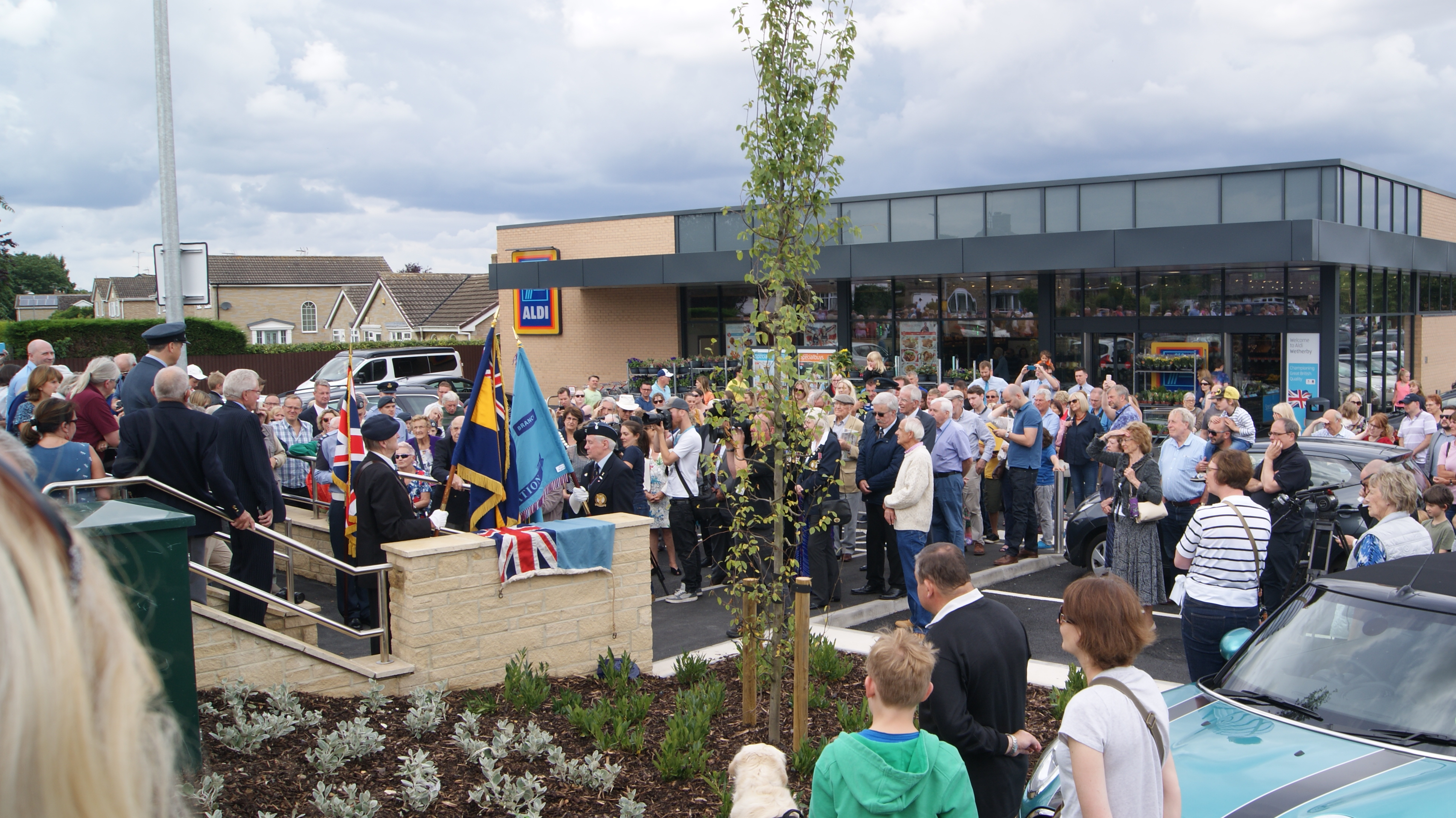
Plaque unveiling on the site of Lacey's childhood home in Wetherby in 2017

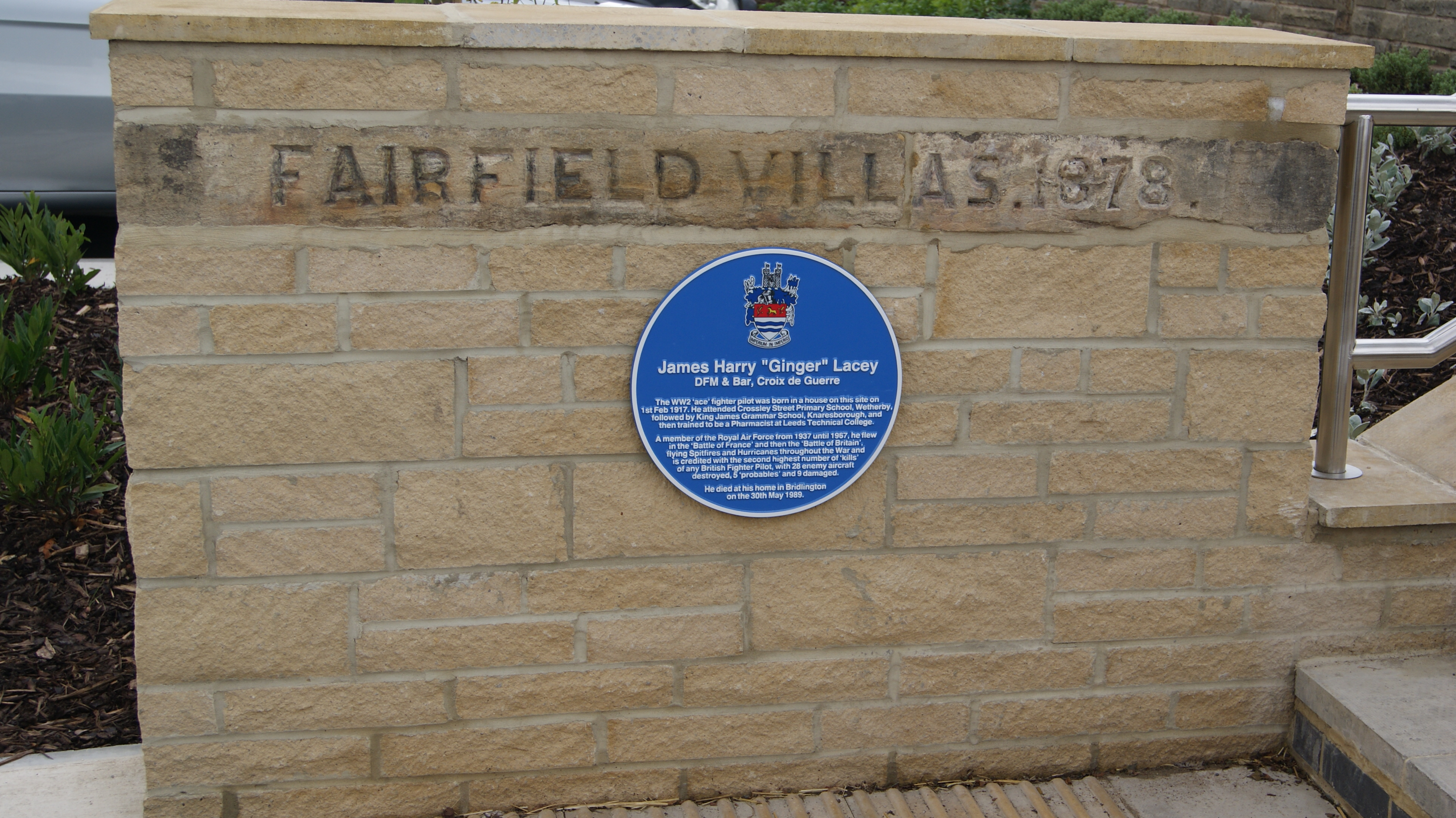
Blue plaque

After retirement, Lacey ran an air freight business and instructed at a flight school near Bridlington. He was an adviser to director Guy Hamilton on the set of his 1969 film Battle of Britain. Said Hamilton in an interview 30 years later "I entrusted Ginger Lacey to be my main adviser. He really was a good chap, totally invaluable". Lacey died at Bridlington on 30 May 1989 at the age of 72.

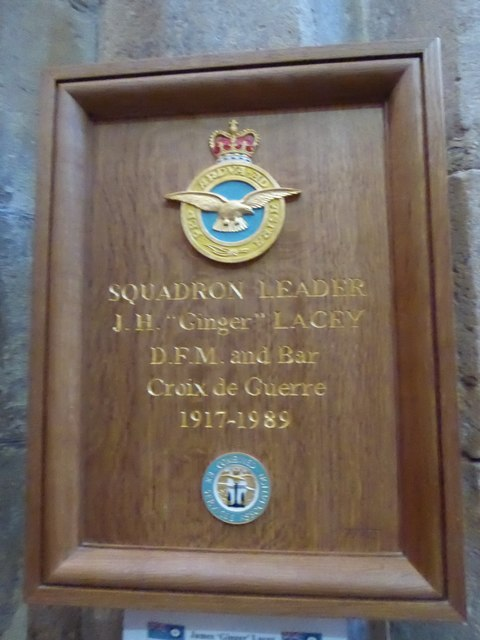
Memorial in Bridlington Priory

Lacey's medals are in the Lord Ashcroft Medal Collection. As a celebrated former pupil of King James' School, an image of Lacey is displayed on one of the Knaresborough Town Windows. In September 2001, a plaque was unveiled at Priory Church, Bridlington, Yorkshire in his memory. In 2016, Beverley/Linley Hill Airfield named their new flight training centre after Lacey. A blue plaque was placed at the location of the house Lacey grew up in Wetherby, the site now that of an Aldi supermarket and unveiled in July 2017.
