= Operation Diver =

British military operation in World War II

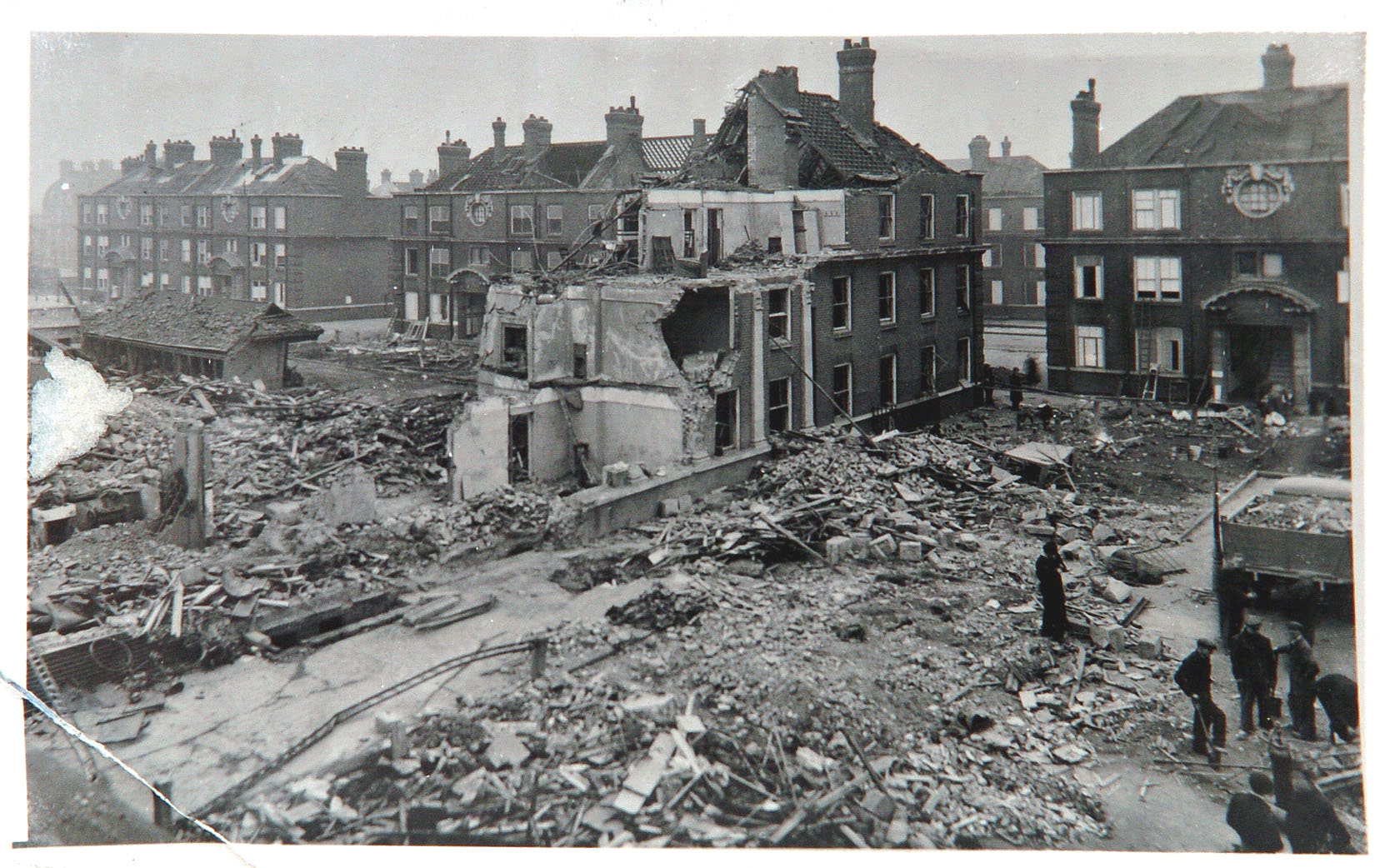
Cleverly estate, Shepherd's Bush, London, after being hit by a V-1 flying bomb, 1945.

Operation Diver was the British code name for the V-1 flying bomb campaign launched by the German Luftwaffe in 1944 against London and other parts of Britain. Diver was the code name for the V-1, against which the defence consisted of anti-aircraft guns, barrage balloons and fighter aircraft.

The British Double-Cross System used double agents to plant false information about the accuracy of the V-1 bombardment. Anti-aircraft guns proved the most effective form of defence in the later stages of the campaign, with the aid of radar-based technology and the proximity fuse. The V-1 campaign from ground launch sites ended by the middle of 1944 with the Allied occupation of the launch sites.

== Diver Plan ==
The Diver Plan was prepared in early 1944 following the first reports of the weapon in April 1943 and the discovery of its intended launch sites in late 1943. The plan had to be flexible enough to cover the anticipated assault on Britain and the needs of Operation Overlord, the Allied invasion of Europe. The V-1 offensive began on the sixth day after the D-Day landings, when the first sighting of an incoming V-1 approaching the English coast was reported by the Royal Observer Corps with the message "Diver, Diver, Diver". Defences that had been guarding the embarkation ports for the invasion were redeployed against the V-1.

== Defences ==
=== Anti-aircraft guns ===
Anti-aircraft guns were redeployed in several moves: first in mid-June 1944 from positions on the North Downs to the south coast of England; then a cordon closing the Thames Estuary to attacks from the east. In September 1944 a new linear defence line was formed on the coast of East Anglia, and finally in December there was a further layout along the Lincolnshire–Yorkshire coast. The deployments were prompted by the ever-changing approach tracks of the missiles which were determined by the Allied advance through Western Europe.

Anti-aircraft gunners found that such small, fast-moving targets were difficult to hit. At first, it took an average of 2,500 shells to bring down a V-1. The average altitude of the V-1, between 2,000–3,000 ft (610–910 m) was in a narrow band above the optimum engagement height range for light 40 mm Bofors guns. The rate of traverse of the standard British QF 3.7 inch mobile gun was too slow for the heights at which V-1s flew and static gun installations with faster traverses had to be built at great cost. The development of centimetric (roughly 30 GHz frequency) gun laying radars based on the cavity magnetron and the development of the proximity fuze helped to neutralise the advantages of speed and size which the V-1 possessed. In 1944 Bell Labs started delivery of an anti-aircraft predictor fire-control system based around an analogue computer, (which supplanted the previous electro-mechanical Kerrison Predictor) just in time for use in the campaign.

==== Technological advances ====
By mid-August 1944, the threat was all but overcome by the expedited arrival of two enormously effective electronic aids for anti-aircraft guns, the first developed by the Radiation Laboratory at the Massachusetts Institute of Technology (MIT Rad Lab) radar-based automatic gun-laying (using, among others, the SCR-584 radar) and the proximity fuze. Both of these had been requested by Anti-Aircraft Command and arrived in numbers, starting in June 1944, just as the guns reached their free-firing positions on the coast. Seventeen percent of all flying bombs entering the coastal gun belt were destroyed by guns in the first week on the coast. This rose to 60 per cent by 23 August and 74 per cent in the last week of the month, when on one day 82 per cent were shot down. The rate increased from one V-1 for every 2,500 shells fired to one for every hundred.

=== Barrage balloons ===
Barrage balloons were also deployed against the missiles but the leading edges of the V-1's wings were equipped with balloon cable cutters and fewer than 300 V-1s are known to have been destroyed by hitting cables.

=== Aircraft ===
Parts of the south of England, over which the V-1s were expected to fly, were allocated specifically for fighter operations. Most fighter aircraft were too slow to catch a V-1 except in a dive and even when intercepted, the V-1 was difficult to bring down. Machine-gun bullets had little effect on the sheet steel structure and 20 mm cannon shells were explosive projectiles; detonating the warhead could destroy the fighter as well. The V-1 was nearly immune to conventional air-combat techniques because of its design, which dispensed with a pilot and piston engine with a cooling system. One hit on the pilot or oxygen system can damage or shoot down a conventional aeroplane but there is no pilot in a cruise missile. The Argus pulse jet of the V-1 could be shot full of holes and still provide sufficient thrust for flight. The only vulnerable point of the engine was the valve array at the front. The only other vulnerable points on the V-1 were the bomb detonators and the line from the fuel tank; three very small targets inside the fuselage. An explosive shell from a fighter's cannon or anti-aircraft gun hitting the warhead was most effective.

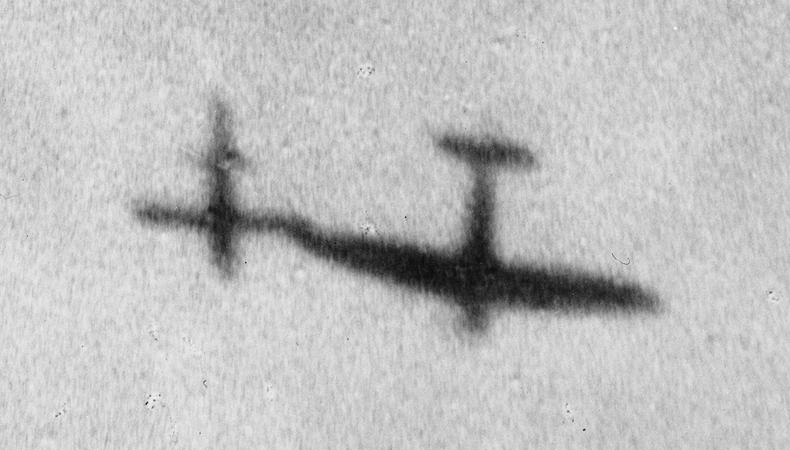
A Spitfire using its wing tip to 'topple' a V-1 flying bomb

When the attacks began in mid-June 1944 there were fewer than 30 Hawker Tempests in No. 150 Wing RAF to defend against them. Few other aircraft had the low-altitude speed to be effective. Early attempts to intercept V-1s often failed but techniques were rapidly developed. These included using the airflow over an interceptor's wing to raise one wing of the V-1, by sliding the wing tip under the bomb's wing and bringing it to within 6 in (150 mm) of the lower surface. Done properly, the airflow would tip the wing of the V-1 upwards, overriding the bomb's gyros and sending it out of control into dive. At least three V-1s were destroyed this way.

The Tempest wing was built up to over 100 aircraft by September; P-51 Mustangs and Griffon-engined Spitfire XIVs were tuned to make them almost fast enough and during the short summer nights the Tempests shared operations with de Havilland Mosquitos. Modified P-47M Thunderbolts (half of their fuel tanks removed, half of their 0.5in [12.7 mm] machine-gun armament, all external fittings and all their armour plate removed) were also pressed into service. There was no need for radar in good weather — at night the V-1's engine could be heard from 9.9 mi (16 km) or more away and the exhaust plume was highly visible. In poor visibility, radar-equipped Fleet Air Arm (FAA) Fairey Firefly night fighters of 746 Naval Air Squadron based at RAF Ford intercepted the bombs. Wing Commander Roland Beamont had the harmonisation 20 mm cannon on his Tempest changed to converge at 300 yd (270 m), which was so successful that the other aircraft in 150 Wing were also modified.

In daylight, V-1 chases were often chaotic failures, until a special defence zone between London and the coast was declared in which only the fastest fighters were permitted. Between June and mid-August 1944, the small number of Tempests shot down 638 flying bombs. One Tempest pilot, Squadron Leader Joseph Berry of 501 Squadron, destroyed fifty-nine V-1s and Beamont destroyed 31. Next most successful was the Mosquito (428), Spitfire XIV (303) and Mustang, (232). All other aircraft types combined added 158. The experimental jet-powered Gloster Meteor, which was rushed half-ready into service in July 1944 to fight the V-1s, had ample speed but suffered from unreliable armament and accounted for only 13 bombs destroyed.

==== Squadrons on anti-Diver operations ====
- Fighter Interception Unit (detachment), Tempest V, RAF Manston (Kent), merged with 501 Squadron)
- No. 3 Squadron RAF, Tempest V, RAF Newchurch (Kent)
- No. 56 Squadron RAF, Tempest V, RAF Newchurch
- No. 80 Squadron RAF, Tempest V, RAF Manston
- No. 91 Squadron RAF, Spitfire XIV, RAF West Malling (Kent)
- No. 96 Squadron RAF, Mosquito NF Mk XIII, RAF Ford (West Sussex)
- No. 129 Squadron RAF, Mustang III, RAF Brenzett (Kent)
- No. 165 Squadron RAF, Spitfire IXb + 25 lbs boost, RAF Lympne
- No. 274 Squadron RAF, Tempest V, RAF Manston
- No. 306 Polish Fighter Squadron, Mustang III, RAF Brenzett
- No. 315 Polish Fighter Squadron, Mustang III, RAF Brenzett
- No. 322 Squadron RAF, Spitfire XIV, RAF West Malling
- No. 418 Squadron RCAF, Mosquito FB Mk VI, RAF Hunsdon (Essex)
- No. 486 Squadron RAF, Hawker Tempest V, RAF Newchurch
- No. 501 Squadron RAF, Tempest V, RAF Manston
- No. 605 Squadron RAF, Mosquito FB Mk VI, RAF Manston
- 746 Naval Air Squadron, Firefly Night Fighter, RAF Ford

=== Deception ===
Deception concerning the V-1 was also used against the Germans with double agents. MI5 (by way of the Double Cross System) had these agents provide Germany with damage reports for the June 1944 V-1 attacks which implied that on average the bombs were travelling too far, while not contradicting the evidence presumed to be available to German planners from photographic reconnaissance of London. The bombs had been seeded with radio-transmitting samples to confirm their range but the results from these samples were ignored in favour of the false witness accounts. Bombs were repeatedly set to fly shorter and shorter distances (and further from the intended targets) as a result of this false information.

== End of operations ==
In September 1944, Duncan Sandys announced that the "Battle of London" against the V-1 was effectively over, as the launch sites in France had been overrun by Allied ground forces. The Germans had prepared sites in the Netherlands, from which they launched V-1 attacks against Antwerp and Brussels starting in October 1944, against which Operation Vapour was mounted. V-2 bombardments began in September 1944, and the last enemy action of any kind on British soil in the war occurred on 29 March 1945, when a V-1 struck an empty field near Datchworth in Hertfordshire.

== See also ==
- Antwerp X
