= Percy Morfill =

British flying ace

- Born: 11 December 1914; Gosport, Hampshire, United Kingdom
- Died: April 2004 (aged 89); Chichester, West Sussex, United Kingdom
- Military career
- Allegiance: United Kingdom
- Branch: Royal Air Force
- Service years: 1930–1958
- Rank: Squadron Leader
- Units: No. 65 Squadron; No. 501 Squadron
- Commands: Station Flight, RAF Tangmere
- Conflicts: Second World War: Battle of France; Battle of Britain
- Awards: Distinguished Flying Medal; Mention in despatches (2)

Percy Frederick Morfill DFM (11 December 1914 – April 2004) was a British flying ace of the Royal Air Force (RAF) during the Second World War. He was credited with least six aerial victories.

From Gosport, Morfill joined the RAF in 1933 as a metal rigger. He volunteered for pilot training three years later and on completion of his flight training was posted to No. 65 Squadron. A few months after the outbreak of the Second World War, he was posted to No. 501 Squadron. He flew in the Battle of France and in the subsequent Battle of Britain, during which he destroyed a number of aircraft. Commissioned in 1942, he spent most of the remainder of the war as an instructor in the United Kingdom and Southern Rhodesia. Remaining in the RAF in the postwar period, he continued to serve in instructing posts as well as staff roles. He left the RAF in 1958 and worked in the automotive industry until 1977, when he retired. In April 2004, he died at the age of 89.

== Early life ==
Percy Frederick Morfill, the son of a publican, was born in Gosport in Hampshire on 11 December 1914. He went to school in Salisbury, in the county of Wiltshire, at Bishop Wordsworth's School, following which he sat an examination for entry into the Royal Air Force (RAF) under the Aircraft Apprentice Scheme. He passed with the highest marks for a candidate from Wiltshire. He duly enlisted in the RAF on 3 September 1930 as an aircraft apprentice. After three years of training, he qualified as a metal rigger.

After a period of service with the Fleet Air Arm at the RAF base at Gosport, Morfill volunteered for pilot training. As a successful applicant, he proceeded to No. 3 Elementary & Reserve Flying Training School at Hamble in early 1936. He then went on to No. 6 Flying Training School at Netheravon Airfield in March. Gaining his wings, he was posted to No. 65 Squadron as a sergeant at the start of 1937. His new unit operated the Gloster Gauntlet fighter, and Morfill was soon on its aerobatics team, alongside the future flying ace Robert Stanford Tuck.

== Second World War ==
At the time of the outbreak of the Second World War, No. 65 Squadron was operating the Supermarine Spitfire fighter from RAF Northolt. It began active operations on 5 September 1939. Morfill's war service with the squadron was brief for in early 1940, he was posted to No. 501 Squadron.

=== Battle of France ===
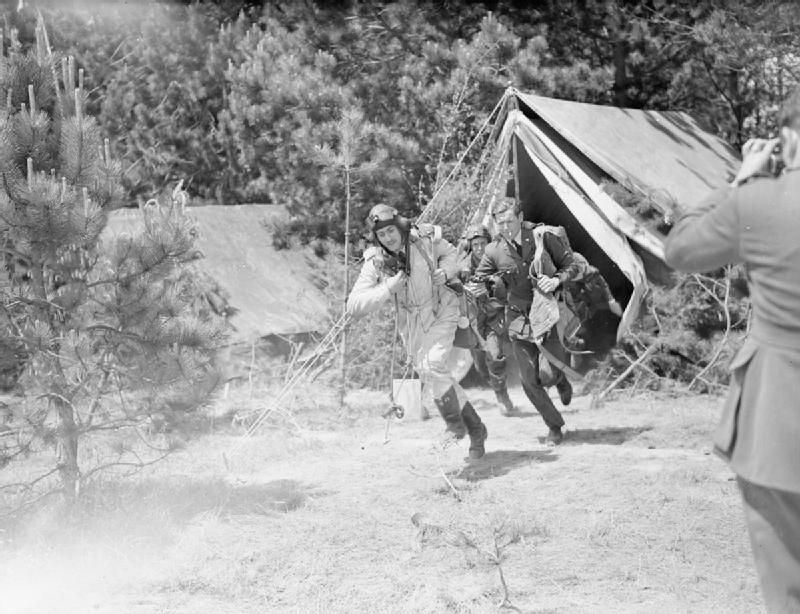
Pilots of No. 501 Squadron scrambling for a sortie from their base at Betheniville, in France

Morfill's new unit was based at RAF Tangmere and operated the Hawker Hurricane fighter. He went with it to France following the German invasion of the Low Countries on 10 May. The squadron suffered a number of casualties when one of its transport aircraft, a Bristol Bombay, crashed on landing at Bethienville. By this time a flight sergeant, Morfill destroyed a Messerschmitt Bf 110 heavy fighter on 11 May near Tourteron and followed this up the following day with the destruction of a Heinkel He 111 medium bomber. Morfill flew a number of sorties during the retreat and subsequent evacuation of the bulk of the British Expeditionary Force (BEF) from Dunkirk.

Having retreated to Dinard as the Germans advanced deeper into France, the squadron was forced to evacuate to St Helier on Jersey in the Channel Islands on 18 June. From there it covered the evacuation of elements of the BEF from Cherbourg. By 21 June, it was back in the United Kingdom at Croydon. However, Morfill had to remain at St Helier as his Hurricane developed a fault before he could fly out. As his aircraft was not serviceable, it was destroyed so it would not be of use to the Germans once they captured the Channel Islands and Morfill, along with other British military personnel, was evacuated by fishing boat.

=== Battle of Britain ===
No. 501 Squadron was now based at Gravesend in Kent as part of No. 11 Group, and was heavily engaged during the Battle of Britain, regularly flying three or four sorties a day through August and September. About 10 miles (16 km) east of Dover, Morfill destroyed a Messerschmitt Bf 109 fighter and damaged two Junkers Ju 87 dive bombers on 29 July. He shot down a Bf 110 on 12 August over The Downs. During a large engagement over Kent on 18 August, he bailed out of his damaged Hurricane. He claimed as damaged a Bf 109 on 24 August. He claimed a He 111 as destroyed near Dungeness on 30 August and damaged a Dornier Do 17 medium bomber on 2 September. He was one of six pilots credited with a share of a Do 17 destroyed over the Thames Estuary on 11 September. His last aerial victory, a Do 17 shot down near Ramsgate, was achieved four days later.

Morfill was recommended for the Distinguished Flying Medal (DFM), and this was duly announced in The London Gazette in October. The published citation read:

This airman has displayed great skill and coolness in his attacks against the enemy. His fine attacking qualities have enabled him to destroy at least seven of their aircraft.

— The London Gazette, No. 34976, 22 October 1940

By this time, the operational pressure on the squadron had tapered off. One of the most engaged units during the Battle of Britain, it claimed 149 German aircraft as destroyed including those shot down during the Battle of France. Morfill was credited with six solo aerial victories, with one more shared and from 18 June to 31 October, he had flown 215 sorties. The squadron was transferred to No. 10 Group in December for a rest and refit, operating from Filton. At the start of the following year, Morfill was mentioned in despatches.

=== Later war service ===
In June 1941, Morfill was Posted to No. 58 Operational Training Unit (OTU) at Grangemouth in June 1941, Morfill subsequently took training as an instructor at the Central Flying School (CFS) at RAF Little Rissington. He then returned to No. 58 OTU. At the end of the year he went back to the CFS as an instructor. Mentioned in despatches again on 1 January 1942, he was commissioned as a pilot officer later in the month. An instructing post at the Flight Instructor's School at Hullavington followed. He was promoted to flying officer with effect from 1 October 1942.

In 1944, and by this time a flight lieutenant, Morfill was sent to a flying school at Norton in Southern Rhodesia on instructing duties where he remained for the rest of the war.

== Later life ==
Morfill stayed in the RAF in the postwar period, returning to the United Kingdom and taking up a posting at the Air Ministry. He then worked on bomber development with the Ministry of Aircraft Production. Granted an extended commission in July 1947, he went to the CFS and subsequently served as the chief flying instructor at the University Air Squadron at St Andrews University in Scotland. He was promoted to squadron leader in 1953, by this time serving in a posting at the headquarters of No. 63 Group at RAF Hawarden. He left the RAF in early 1958, having spent the previous two years as the commander of the Station Flight at Tangmere.

Taking up employment in the automotive industry, working for Wingards, a manufacturer of vehicle accessories, Morfill eventually retired in 1977. In his later years he lived in Chichester, in West Sussex, where he died on 3 April 2004, aged 89. His remains were cremated and interred at the Tangmere Museum Memorial Garden.
