= No. 501 Squadron RAuxAF =

No. 501 (County of Gloucester) Squadron RAuxAF
- Active: 14 June 1929 – 20 April 1945; 10 May 1946 – 10 March 1957; June 2001 – present
- Country: United Kingdom
- Branch: Royal Auxiliary Air Force
- Role: Logistics
- Part of: No 85 Expeditionary Logistics Wing, RAF A4 Force
- Mottos: Latin: Nil Time ("Fear nothing")
- Colors
- Battle honours: France & Low Countries, 1940; Battle of Britain, 1940; Home Defence, 1940–45; Fortress Europe, 1940–44; Channel & North Sea, 1940–44; France & Germany, 1944; Normandy, 1944; All these honours are emblazoned on the squadron standard

Commanders
- Honorary Air Commodore: Prince Henry, Duke of Gloucester
- Notable commanders: Christopher Frederick "Bunny" Currant; Joseph Berry

Insignia
- Squadron Badge heraldry: A boar's head couped The boar's head is taken from the arms of Gloucester; the animal is also noted for its courage
- Squadron Codes: ZH (Apr 1939 – Sep 1939); SD (Sep 1939 – Apr 1945 and 1949–1951); RAB (May 1946–1949)

No. 501 Squadron was the 14th of the 21 flying units in the Royal Auxiliary Air Force, the volunteer reserve part of the British Royal Air Force. The squadron won seven battle honours, flying Hurricane, Spitfire and Tempest fighter aircraft during World War II and was one of the busiest units in RAF Fighter Command. The squadron saw extensive action during the Battle of France and Battle of Britain. At present the unit is not flying any more and has a logistics role as part of No 85 Expeditionary Logistics Wing.

== History ==
=== Formation and early years ===
The squadron was originally formed as a day-bomber unit named No 501 (City of Bristol) Squadron as part of the Special Reserve squadrons on 14 June 1929, made up of volunteers and regulars, flying D.H.9As, which were later replaced with Westland Wapitis and later still with Westland Wallaces. In 1936 it became "No 501 (County of Gloucester) Squadron", changing the name to embrace a larger area of recruitment. On 1 May 1936 it was transferred to the Auxiliary Air Force and in July of that year the squadron converted to Hawker Harts. In March 1938 these were exchanged for Hawker Hinds, but at the end of 1938 No. 501 squadron was transferred from RAF Bomber Command to RAF Fighter Command, and Hawker Hurricanes began to arrive in March 1939.

=== Second World War ===
When war was declared in September 1939, 501 Squadron was based at RAF Filton, near Bristol. On 10 May 1940, with the attack on France, the Squadron became part of the Advanced Air Striking Force and moved to France where it saw extensive action, stationed at airfields as Bétheniville, Anglure, Le Mans and Dinard. Sgt J. H. "Ginger" Lacey of 501 Squadron shot down three German aircraft in a day to win the Croix de Guerre. (He returned to England with five victories.) After the retreat from France through Saint Helier, Jersey, its battle-hardened pilots were reorganised at RAF Croydon and then moved on to RAF Middle Wallop and later RAF Gravesend (now Gravesend Airport). It subsequently served at RAF Kenley, south London, commanded by S/L Harry Hogan, until 17 December 1940 by which time the squadron had claimed 149 enemy aircraft destroyed. Success came at a high cost; in addition to the losses suffered in France, the squadron lost 19 pilots killed during the Battle of Britain, more than any other squadron.

The squadron re-equipped with the Supermarine Spitfire in April 1941 and the squadron moved to Northern Ireland in October 1942. In April 1943 the squadron returned to Tangmere for bomber escort work – some pilots being issued with the Spitfire Mk IXc. Between November 1943 and October 1944 the squadron formed part of Air Defence of Great Britain (ADGB). For Operation Overlord, the Allied invasion of Normandy, it flew the Spitfire LF V operating from RAF Friston in ADGB, though under the operational control of the RAF Second Tactical Air Force.

During August 1944, the squadron began converting to the Tempest Mk.V at RAF Manston, for Operation Diver – the interception of V-1 missiles. On 23 August, a Tempest flight from the elite Fighter Interception Unit (FIU) was merged into 501 Squadron and S/L Joe Berry of FIU was appointed commanding officer of the combined unit.

The squadron was disbanded at RAF Hunsdon at the end of the war on 20 April 1945. During the war, the pilots of 501 Squadron had flown 11,140 operational sorties, in which they shot down 201 enemy aircraft and at least 84 V-1s.

=== Notable squadron members ===
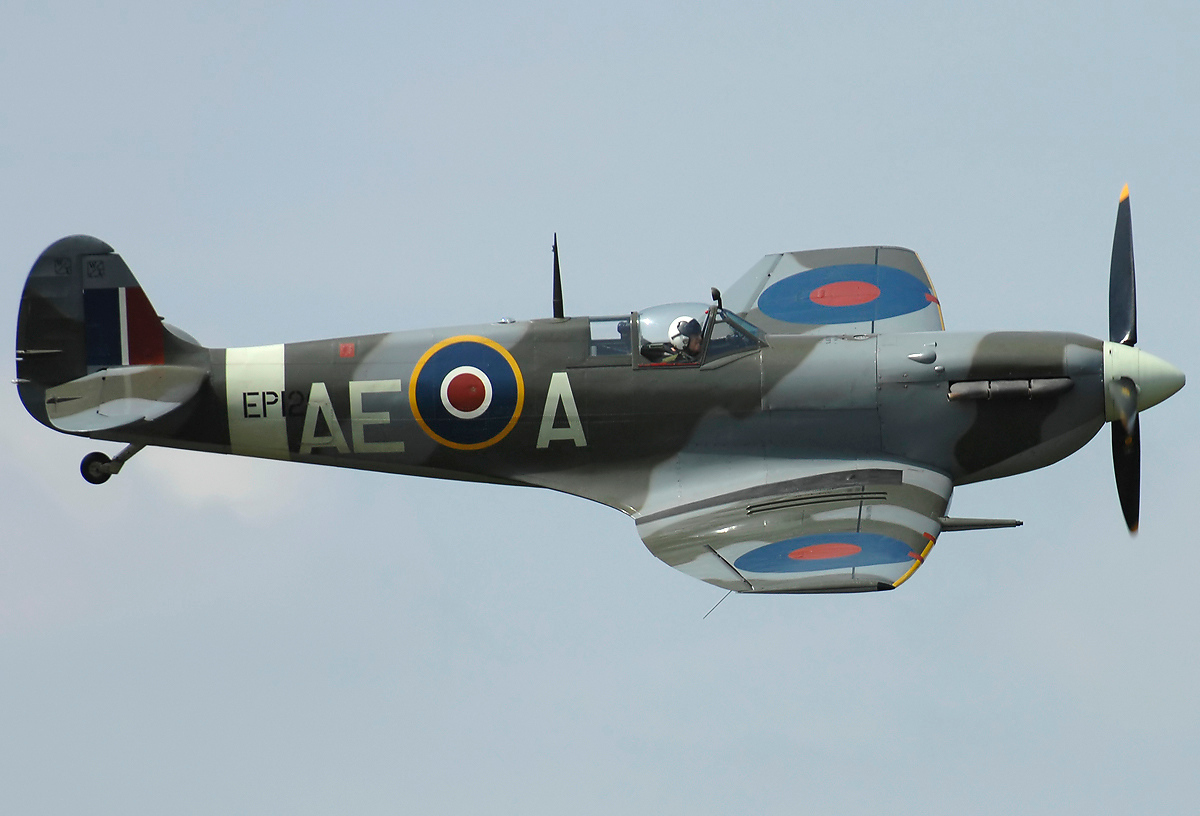
Supermarine Spitfire Vb number EP120 (2010). This aircraft was allocated to 501 Squadron in 1942 and flown by Squadron Leader Geoffrey Northcott, who used it to shoot down six Axis aircraft. It is currently painted in the markings it carried when subsequently serving with RCAF 402 Squadron

The squadron included several notable pilots of World War II, including Sergeant Pilot Antoni (Toni) Głowacki VM, CV and 3 bars, DFC, DFM, who shot down five German aircraft on 24 August 1940 to become the first of only two pilots to achieve "Ace-in-a-day" status during the Battle of Britain. Among others who achieved fighter ace status were Ken Mackenzie, "Ginger" Lacey, Stanisław Skalski, Robert Dafforn, Paul Farnes DFM, Kenneth Lee, Donald McKay, and Percy Morfill. Lacey was one of the highest scoring pilots in the Battle of Britain. Squadron Leader Joseph Berry, DFC & 2 bars, was the top scoring V-1 (flying bomb) ace of the squadron, though he claimed only 10 of his 61 victories whilst flying with 501 Squadron. In addition to these unmanned missiles he also shot down three enemy aircraft.

=== Into the jet age ===
The squadron was reformed on 10 May 1946 as an Auxiliary Air Force fighter squadron at RAF Filton. In February 1957, Flt Lt John Crossley flew Vampire FB.9 jet WR260 beneath the Clifton Suspension Bridge, before a fatal crash into Leigh Woods. This was the last recorded – and only jet aircraft – flight under that bridge. The Squadron was disbanded in March 1957, along with all the other Auxiliary units.

=== Present role ===
In June 2001 No. 501 squadron was reformed in the Force Protection role as 501 (Operational Support) Squadron in 2001 at RAF Brize Norton. 501 Squadrons Gunners provide a reserve of trained manpower for 1 Squadron RAF Regiment, No 4 Force Protection Wing. In 2003, its personnel deployed as part of Operation Telic, the liberation of Iraq. The squadron continues to deploy personnel on Force Protection duties in this region. In 2006 the first 501 Squadron Gunners deployed with 2 Squadron RAF Regiment to Afghanistan, carrying out force protection duties of Kandahar airfield and surrounding areas. This has been continued with members of both Regiment and FP roles mobilising with 1 Squadron RAF Regiment tour of the region (8 August to 9 March). Between November 2006 and April 2007 501 Squadron Gunners also deployed with the Queens Colour Squadron, 63 Squadron RAF Regiment to Basra Iraq. Based at RAF Brize Norton in Oxfordshire, 501 (County of Gloucester) Squadron has been newly re-formed to expand the RAF Reserves Logistics capability, recruiting Logistics Officers, Drivers and Suppliers as part of No 85 Expeditionary Logistics Wing of the RAF A4 Force.

== Aircraft operated ==
Aircraft operated by no. 501 Squadron RAF, data from
From	To	Aircraft	Version	Remark
August 1929	March 1930*	Avro 504	N	Used for training
March 1930	November 1930	Airco DH.9A		
September 1930	March 1933*	Westland Wapiti	Mk.IIa	
January 1933	July 1936	Westland Wallace	Mk.I	
March 1936	July 1936	Westland Wallace	Mk.II	
June 1935	March 1937	De Havilland Tiger Moth	Mk.I	Used for training
January 1936	October 1939	Avro Tutor	Mk.I	Used for training
July 1936	March 1938*	Hawker Hart	Mk.I	One example used for training till May 1939
March 1938	March 1939*	Hawker Hind	Mk.I	One example used for training till February 1941
March 1939	December 1939	Fairey Battle		Used for training
March 1939	May 1941	Hawker Hurricane	Mks.I, II and X	
August 1940	January 1943	Miles Magister		Used for training
April 1941	June 1941	Supermarine Spitfire	Mk.I	
May 1941	September 1941	Supermarine Spitfire	Mk.IIa	One example (P8799) soldiered on till July 1943
September 1941	January 1942	Supermarine Spitfire	Mk.Va	R7334, nicknamed "Perfect"
September 1941	July 1944	Supermarine Spitfire	Mk.Vb	
1942	November 1942	Miles Master		Used for training
May 1942	October 1942	Supermarine Spitfire	Mk.Vc	
November 1943	July 1944	Supermarine Spitfire	Mk.IX	
July 1944	April 1945	Hawker Tempest	Mk.V	
August 1946	November 1953	Harvard	T.2b	Used for training
October 1946	May 1949	Supermarine Spitfire	LF.16e	
November 1948	June 1951	de Havilland Vampire	F.1	
September 1949	February 1957	Gloster Meteor	T.7	Used for training
March 1951	March 1957	de Havilland Vampire	FB.5	
February 1955	February 1957	de Havilland Vampire	FB.9	
September 1955	February 1957	Gloster Meteor	F.8	Used for training

*=Remained in service after replacement as main equipment

== Squadron Stations ==
Stations and airfields used by No 501 Squadron RAF, data from
From	To	Base	Remark
14 June 1929	28 November 1939	RAF Filton, Gloucestershire	
28 November 1939	10 May 1940	RAF Tangmere, West Sussex	
10 May 1940	16 May 1940	Bétheniville, France	
16 May 1940	2 June 1940	Anglure, France	
2 June 1940	11 June 1940	Le Mans, France	
11 June 1940	17 June 1940	Dinard, France	
17 June 1940	21 June 1940	RAF Saint Helier, Jersey, Channel Islands	
21 June 1940	4 July 1940	RAF Croydon, Surrey	
4 July 1940	25 July 1940	RAF Middle Wallop, Hampshire	
25 July 1940	10 September 1940	RAF Gravesend, Kent	
10 September 1940	17 December 1940	RAF Kenley, Surrey	
17 December 1940	9 April 1941	RAF Filton, Gloucestershire	
9 April 1941	25 June 1941	RAF Colerne, Wiltshire	
25 June 1941	5 August 1941	RAF Chilbolton, Hampshire	
5 August 1941	3 July 1942	RAF Ibsley, Hampshire	
3 July 1942	24 August 1942	RAF Tangmere, West Sussex	
24 August 1942	8 October 1942	RAF Middle Wallop, Hampshire	
8 October 1942	10 October 1942	RAF Hawkinge, Kent	
10 October 1942	19 October 1942	RAF Middle Wallop, Hampshire	
19 October 1942	30 April 1943	RAF Ballyhalbert, County Down, Northern Ireland	det. at RAF Eglinton, County Londonderry, Northern Ireland
30 April 1943	17 May 1943	RAF Westhampnett, West Sussex	
17 May 1943	5 June 1943	RAF Martlesham Heath, Suffolk	
5 June 1943	12 June 1943	RAF Woodvale, Merseyside	
12 June 1943	21 June 1943	RAF Westhampnett, West Sussex	
21 June 1943	21 January 1944	RAF Hawkinge, Kent	
21 January 1944	4 February 1944	RAF Southend, Essex	
4 February 1944	30 April 1944	RAF Hawkinge, Kent	
30 April 1944	2 July 1944	RAF Friston, East Sussex	
2 July 1944	2 August 1944	RAF Westhampnett, West Sussex	
2 August 1944	22 September 1944	RAF Manston, Kent	
22 September 1944	3 March 1945	RAF Bradwell Bay, Essex	
3 March 1945	20 April 1945	RAF Hunsdon, Essex	
10 May 1946	5 September 1951	RAF Filton, Gloucestershire	
5 September 1951	8 October 1951	RAF Tangmere, West Sussex	
8 October 1951	10 March 1957	RAF Filton, Gloucestershire	

== Commanding officers ==
Officers Commanding No 501 Squadron RAF, data from
From	To	Name
July 1929	August 1929	Flt/Lt. L.P. Winters
August 1929	January 1932	S/Ldr. R.S. Sugden, AFC
January 1932	January 1934	S/Ldr. W. Eliot, DFC
January 1934	June 1936	S/Ldr. H.G. White
June 1936	June 1936	Flt/Lt. H.M. Pearson
June 1936	December 1936	Flt/Lt. E.S. Finch
December 1936	March 1937	Flt/Lt. H.R.L. Hood
March 1937	July 1937	Flt/Lt. F.W. Stannard
July 1937	June 1940	S/Ldr. M.V.M. Clube
June 1940	November 1940	S/Ldr. H.A.V. Hogan
November 1940	June 1941	S/Ldr. E. Holden, DFC
June 1941	August 1941	S/Ldr. A.H. Boyd, DFC
August 1941	June 1942	S/Ldr. C.F. Currant, DFC
June 1942	September 1942	S/Ldr. J.W. Villa, DFC & Bar
September 1942	May 1943	S/Ldr. A.I. Robinson
May 1943	October 1943	S/Ldr. E. Barthold
October 1943	August 1944	S/Ldr. M.G. Barnett, RNZAF
August 1944	November 1944	S/Ldr. Joseph Berry, DFC
November 1944	April 1945	S/Ldr. A. Parker-Rees, DFC
August 1946	December 1946	Flt/Lt. R.F.W. Cleaver, DSO, DFC (acting)
December 1946	September 1949	S/Ldr. T. James
September 1949	September 1950	S/Ldr. A.C. Henderson, DFC
September 1950	October 1952	S/Ldr. P.J. Simpson, DSO, DFC
October 1952	May 1955	S/Ldr. G.B. Mercer
May 1955	March 1957	S/Ldr. M.C. Collings
