= Adrian Boyd =

British flying ace of WWII

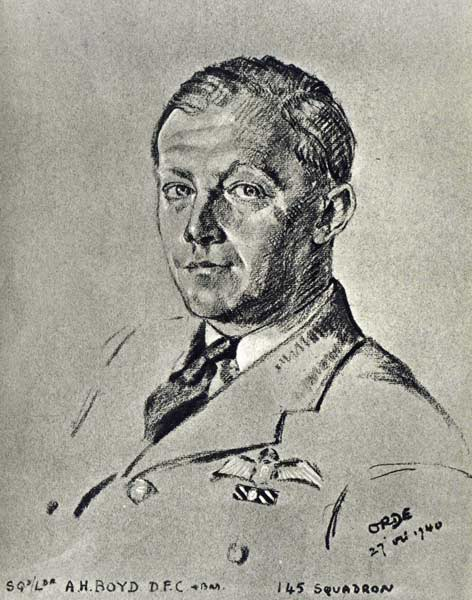
- Portrait of Boyd, made by Cuthbert Orde in 1940
- Born: 1 January 1913; Sialkot, British India (now Pakistan)
- Died: 21 January 1975 (aged 62)
- Military career
- Allegiance: United Kingdom
- Branch: Royal Navy; Royal Air Force
- Service years: 1924–1934 (RN); 1936–1947 (RAF)
- Rank: Wing commander
- Unit: No. 145 Squadron
- Commands: No. 281 Wing; No. 501 Squadron
- Conflicts: Second World War: Battle of France; Battle of Britain; Circus offensive
- Awards: Distinguished Service Order; Distinguished Flying Cross & Bar; Mention in Despatches (2)

Adrian Boyd, DSO, DFC & Bar (1 January 1913 – 21 January 1975) was a British flying ace who served with the Royal Air Force (RAF) during the Second World War. He was credited with having shot down at least eighteen aircraft.

Born in Sialkot in British India, Boyd's initial military service was with the Royal Navy, from which he resigned in 1934. Two years later he joined the RAF, serving with No. 65 Squadron once he completed his flying training. Soon after the outbreak of the Second World War, Boyd was posted to No. 145 Squadron which operated Hawker Hurricane fighters. He flew during the Battle of France and achieved a number of aerial victories for which he was subsequently awarded the Distinguished Flying Cross (DFC). Further successes followed during the Battle of Britain, including five aerial victories in one day on 8 August 1940. The recipient of a Bar to the DFC, he was rested from duties in November and spent several months as an instructor before returning to operations with a posting as commander of No. 501 Squadron during the RAF's Circus offensive. Awarded the Distinguished Service Order, he was later a wing leader and served in the Middle East and Italy. He ended his service with the RAF in 1947. He died in 1975 at the age of 62.

== Early life ==
Adrian Hope Boyd was born at Sialkot in British India (now Pakistan), on 1 January 1913. When he was thirteen-years-old, he joined the Royal Navy as a cadet. He graduated from the Naval College at Dartmouth in May 1930, and the next January was commissioned as a midshipman. He was promoted to acting sub-lieutenant in 1933, but subsequently resigned his commission in May the following year.

Boyd joined the Royal Air Force (RAF) in July 1936, being granted a short service commission. Appointed an acting pilot officer on probation in September, he proceeded to No. 2 Flying Training School at Digby. After gaining his wings, Boyd was posted to No. 65 Squadron in May 1937. His new unit, based at Hornchurch, was equipped with the Gloster Gladiator fighter. He was involved in a flying accident on 11 February 1938; one of a trio of fighters making unauthorised mock attacks on a fourth fighter, two aircraft collided, killing a pilot. He was promoted to flying officer in January 1939.

== Second World War ==
In October 1939, and with the Second World War now underway, Boyd was promoted to the rank of acting flight lieutenant and posted to No. 145 Squadron as one of its flight commanders. The squadron was based at Croydon and operated the Bristol Blenheim aircraft in a day/night fighter role but in March 1940, the squadron converted to the Hawker Hurricane fighter.

=== Battle of France ===
A week after the invasion of France on 10 May 1940, No. 145 Squadron began carrying out sorties to France, supporting the fighter squadrons there in helping to cover the retreat of the British Expeditionary Force (BEF). On 22 May Boyd destroyed three Junkers Ju 87 dive bombers near Saint-Omer, although one of these was unconfirmed. Towards the end of the month his squadron helped provide aerial cover for the evacuation of the BEF and on 27 May Boyd destroyed two Messerschmitt Bf 110 heavy fighters near Dunkirk. He shot down another two Bf 110s later the same day but these were not able to be verified. The following day he was shot down himself into the sea off the evacuation beaches but was picked up and returned to the squadron. On 1 June, he destroyed one Bf 110 and damaged a second to the north of Dunkirk, and also shot down a Messerschmitt Bf 109 fighter in the same area.

Once the evacuation of the BEF was completed, No. 145 Squadron relocated to No. 11 Group's station at Tangmere. Boyd, who had briefly commanded the squadron in an acting capacity for a few days in mid-June, was recognised for his successes in the fighting over France with an award of the Distinguished Flying Cross (DFC) on 21 June. The citation, published in The London Gazette, read:

During a period of fourteen days Flight Lieutenant Boyd was engaged on offensive patrols almost every day. He has destroyed at least six enemy aircraft and severely damaged several more. This officer has displayed courage and determination, often attacking superior forces, and has pressed home his attacks in every case.

— London Gazette, No. 34878, 21 June 1940

=== Battle of Britain ===
No. 145 Squadron was involved in the aerial fighting over the English Channel during the early phase of the Battle of Britain. Now operating from Westhampnett, the squadron carried out interception duties along the English Channel. On 3 July, Boyd shared in the unconfirmed destruction of a Heinkel He 111 medium bomber about 25 miles (40 km) from Cherbourg. He claimed a Bf 110 as destroyed southwest of Selsey Bill on 11 July but this was unconfirmed. He shared in the destruction of a He 111 20 miles (32 km) south of Bognor and this was followed three days later with a share in a destroyed Dornier Do 17 medium bomber near Selsey Bill. On 8 August, during the course of three sorties, he destroyed five aircraft of the Luftwaffe, all to the south of the Isle of Wight; two Bf 109s, two Bf 110s, and a Ju 87. He also damaged a second Ju 87.

The following week, No. 145 Squadron moved north to Drem, in Scotland, for a period of rest and light duties. On 20 August, Boyd was awarded a Bar to his DFC. The published citation read:

This flight commander has been actively engaged in flying operations against the enemy since the commencement of hostilities. By fine leadership and dauntless spirit he has enabled his flight to destroy a large number of enemy aircraft of which he has himself, shot down, or severely damaged, at least twelve.

— London Gazette, No. 34927, 20 August 1940

Flying a night sortie on the evening of 26 August, Boyd destroyed a He 111 east of St Abb's Head. His acting rank of flight lieutenant was made substantive a week later. In October, No. 145 Squadron, which was now commanded again by Boyd in an acting capacity, returned to No. 11 Group's sector and commenced operations from Tangmere. Boyd shared in the destruction of an Arado Ar 196 observation seaplane that was intercepted 12 miles (19 km) south of St Catherine's Point on 12 October and then, three days later, he shot down a Bf 109 over The Needles, his final aerial victory of the year.

=== Later war service ===
Boyd was rested from operations in late November, being sent to the Aeroplane and Armament Experimental Establishment at Boscombe Down. The next month he was posted to an Operational Training Unit to serve as an instructor. In June 1941, he returned to operations with an appointment as the commander of No. 501 Squadron. This was based at Colerne and equipped with the Supermarine Spitfire fighter, carrying out operations to occupied France as part of the Circus offensive. On the night of 7 July, Boyd intercepted a Junkers Ju 88 medium bomber south of Portsmouth, shooting it down into the English Channel. On 24 July, while escorting bombers attacking targets at La Pallice and Brest, he destroyed a pair of Bf 109s, one over Saint-Renan and the other after he crossed the French coast on the return flight to England.

In early August Boyd was appointed the wing leader at No. 10 Group's Middle Wallop. He made his final claim on 13 October, for a Bf 109 that was damaged over Arques while supporting a Circus mounted by No. 11 Group. At the start of December, he was awarded the Distinguished Service Order. The published citation read:

Since August, 1941, this officer has led the wing on numerous occasions greatly distinguishing himself throughout. His excellent leadership and tactical ability have been of great value when difficulties have been encountered. Wing Commander Boyd has destroyed at least 16 enemy aircraft.

— London Gazette, No. 35364, 2 December 1941

Mentioned in despatches in the 1943 New Year Honours, Boyd subsequently served in the Middle East with No. 210 Group. He was promoted to acting wing commander at the start of 1944, and led the Balkan Air Force's No. 281 Wing from Italy. His wing commander rank was made substantive on 10 December 1944. He was mentioned in despatches for a second time in the 1945 Birthday Honours.

When the war ended in August 1945, Boyd was credited with having shot down eighteen aircraft, three being shared with other pilots. He is also credited with four unconfirmed aerial victories, one of which was shared, two probably destroyed, and four damaged.

== Later life ==
Boyd remained in the RAF until 1947, at which time he departed the service with the rank of wing commander. He died on 21 January 1975.
