= Beverley/Linley Hill Airfield =

Airfield in East Yorkshire, England

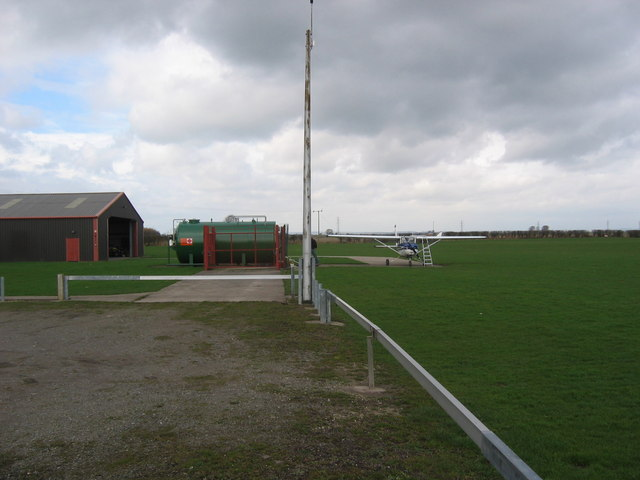
- IATA: none; ICAO: EGNY

Summary
- Airport type: Private
- Operator: Hull Aero Club
- Location: Beverley, East Riding of Yorkshire, England
- Elevation AMSL: 3 ft / 1 m
- Coordinates: 53°53′54″N 000°21′41″W

Map
- Location in the East Riding of Yorkshire

Runways
Direction	Length		Surface
Direction	m	ft	Surface
12/30	710	2,329	Grass
- Sources: Hull Aero Club

Beverley/Linley Hill Airfield (ICAO: EGNY) is an unlicensed aerodrome located 4 nautical miles (7.4 km; 4.6 mi) north-east of Beverley, East Riding of Yorkshire, England.

Beverley/Linley Hill had a CAA Ordinary Licence (Number P762) that allowed flights for the public transport of passengers or for flying instruction as authorised by the licensee (Hull Aero Club Limited). The aerodrome was not licensed for night use. The aerodrome ceased to be licensed in 2011.

In January 2023 a planning application was approved by the East Riding of Yorkshire Council for a new hangar and facilities.
