= Joseph Berry (RAF officer) =

British World War II flying ace

- Born: 28 February 1920; Quarrington, County Durham, England
- Died: 2 October 1944 (aged 24); Veendam, Netherlands
- Burial place: Scheemda Protestant Cemetery, Netherlands
- Military career
- Allegiance: United Kingdom
- Branch: Royal Air Force
- Service years: 1940–1944
- Rank: Squadron Leader
- Nickname: Joe
- Units: No. 256 Squadron RAF; No. 153 Squadron RAF; No. 255 Squadron RAF; No. 501 Squadron RAF
- Conflicts: Second World War: Channel Front; North African Campaign
- Awards: Distinguished Flying Cross & Two Bars

Joseph Berry, DFC & Two Bars (28 February 1920 – 2 October 1944) was a British aviator and flying ace who shot down 59½ V-1 missiles ("flying bombs") during the Second World War, more than any other fighter pilot.

== Early life ==
Berry was born in Quarrington, Teesdale, County Durham and attended Dukes Grammar School in Alnwick, Northumberland. He lived at 55 Ramsey St, Quarrington, Teesdale (12 miles east of Crook, Co Durham). Later, he moved to Hampeth near Alnwick where, from 1931 to 1936, he attended the Duke Grammar School. Leaving school in 1936 as a 16-year-old, Berry moved into lodgings in Carlton, Nottingham for his work in the Inland Revenue, two years later he met Joyce Breatt, his future wife, who was working at the same branch.

== Royal Air Force fighter pilot ==
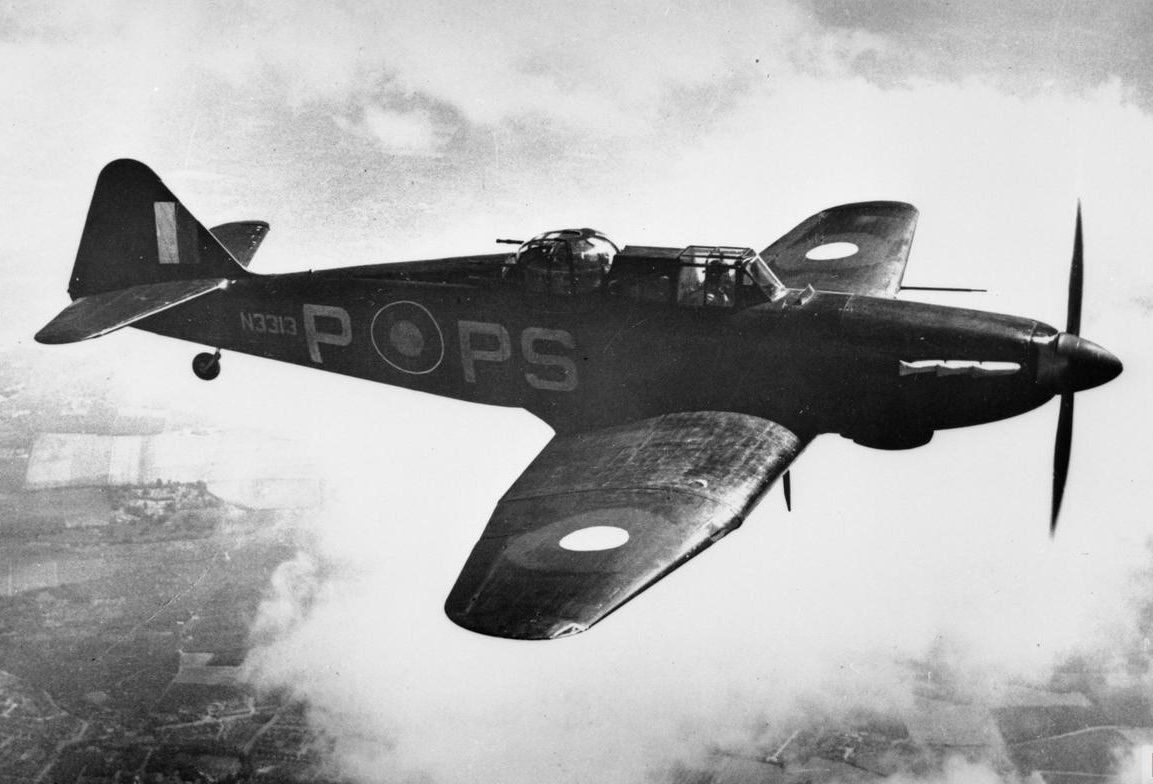
Boulton Paul Defiant.

Berry joined the Royal Air Force Volunteer Reserve on 8 August 1940 as aircraftman 2nd class with service number 1177137.

In August 1941, after completing pilot training, Berry was appointed to the rank of sergeant and posted to a night fighter unit, No. 256 Squadron RAF at RAF Squires Gate and flew Boulton Paul Defiants. On the night of 4 November 1941, Berry and his gunner, Flight Sergeant E. V. Williams, were on a night training sortie when Defiant T4053 lost oil pressure and its engine cut out. Although Williams baled out safely at 4,700 feet, his parachute was blown over the Irish Sea and he could not be located by rescue boats. Berry abandoned the Defiant at 2,700 feet and landed in a field near Skippool. Williams's body was washed up the following day, near Fleetwood.

Berry married Joyce Breatt after being commissioned as an officer on 14 March 1942. He was promoted to flying officer on 1 October 1942.

Transferred to nightfighter operations in North Africa from 30 January 1943, Berry flew Bristol Beaufighters, initially with No. 153 Squadron RAF. Detachments flew from Bone, Setif, Souk el Arba, Souk el Khemis, and Tingley. On 11 April, while Berry and his observer were returning from patrol, the port engine caught fire on Beaufighter VIF ("TB-N"; V8629), forcing them to bale out over the Mediterranean, and wait in a rubber dinghy for six-and-a-half hours, before they were rescued.

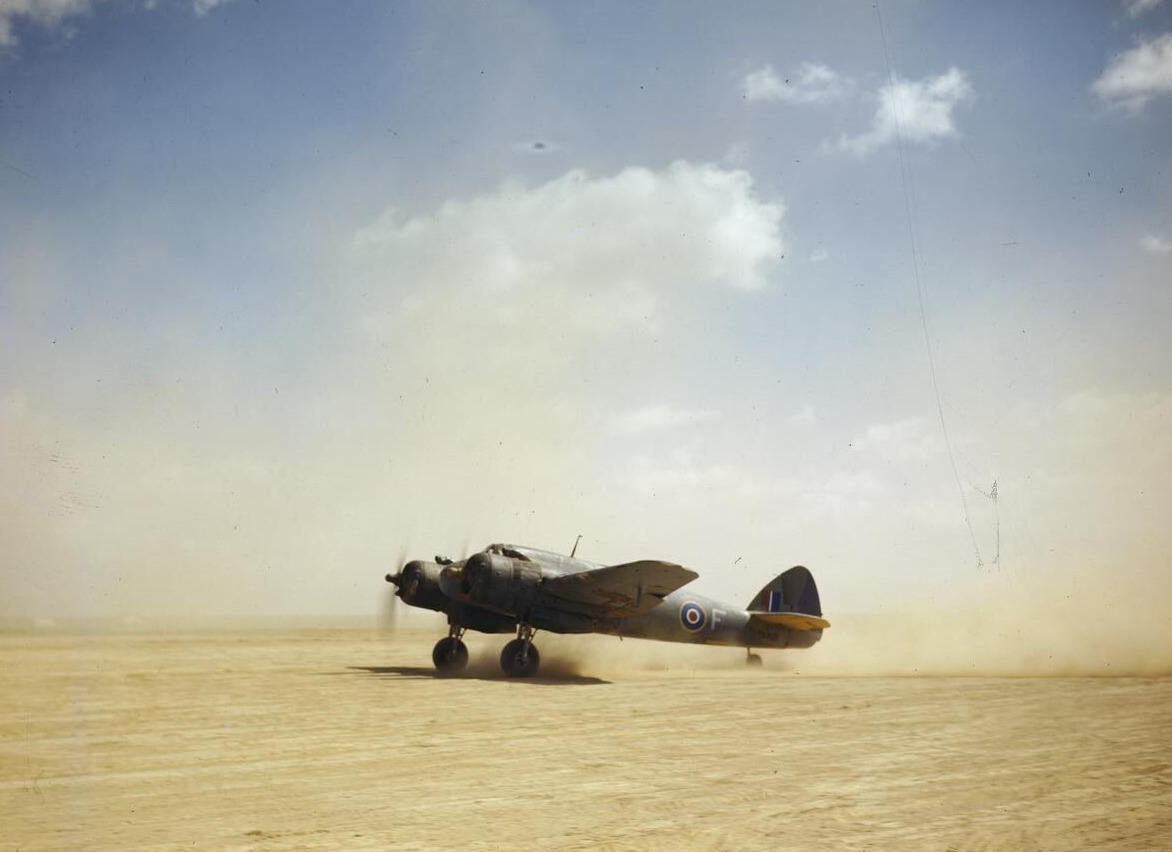
A Beaufighter in the Mediterranean theatre.

From 8 May 1943, Berry flew Beaufighters with No. 255 Squadron RAF, which in August moved to Western Sicily, where sorties were flown over the Salerno invasion fleet and beachhead in September. Berry shot down three enemy aircraft: on 9 September a Messerschmitt Me 210, on 10 September another Me 210 in the Salerno area, and on 24 October he destroyed a Junkers Ju 88 over the Naples area. Following the second kill, Berry was forced to bail out of his Beaufighter Mk VIF (squadron code "YD-F"). As a result of his victories over Salerno and Naples, he was awarded the Distinguished Flying Cross (DFC) on 3 March 1944, and was promoted to flight lieutenant on 14 March. The citation for Berry's DFC read:

This officer is an exceptionally capable pilot who has destroyed three enemy aircraft in the course of a long and strenuous tour of duty. During operations at Salerno in September 1943, he shot a Junkers 88 down in flames, and on the following night destroyed a Messerschmitt 210 over the Italian coast. His third victory took place over Naples in October 1943 when he shot down another Junkers 88. Flying Officer Berry has been forced to abandon his aircraft on two occasions and has operated with coolness and courage in the face of heavy enemy action.

On 3 October 1943, while serving with No. 255 Squadron, Berry was involved in the "Great E-Boat Raid" at Cos, Greece. Sixty aircraft were involved; several Beaufighter squadrons and one Beaufort squadron attacked the German Invasion Force North of the Allied occupied Island. The German invasion force consisted of several large vessels used as troop ships, destroyers, e-boats and landing barges. The attack had mixed results due to heavy enemy fire and bad weather with head winds on the return journey; the Allied squadrons took overall losses of 27%. The Beaufighter had a range of 370 miles, and due to heavy fuel consumption 25 got back, most of the others ditched or were shot down.

== V-1 campaign ==
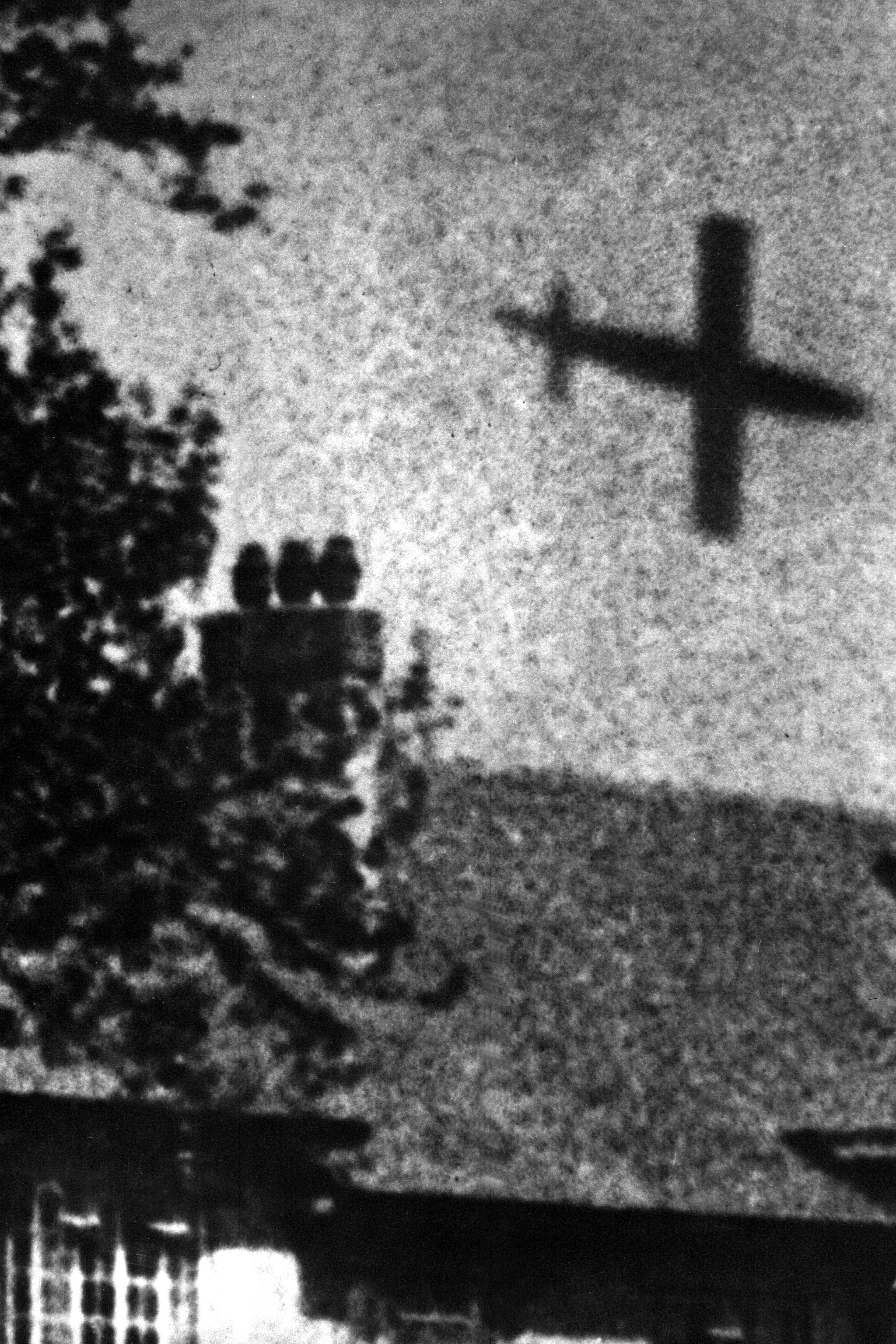
A V-1 flying bomb in flight, c. 1944.

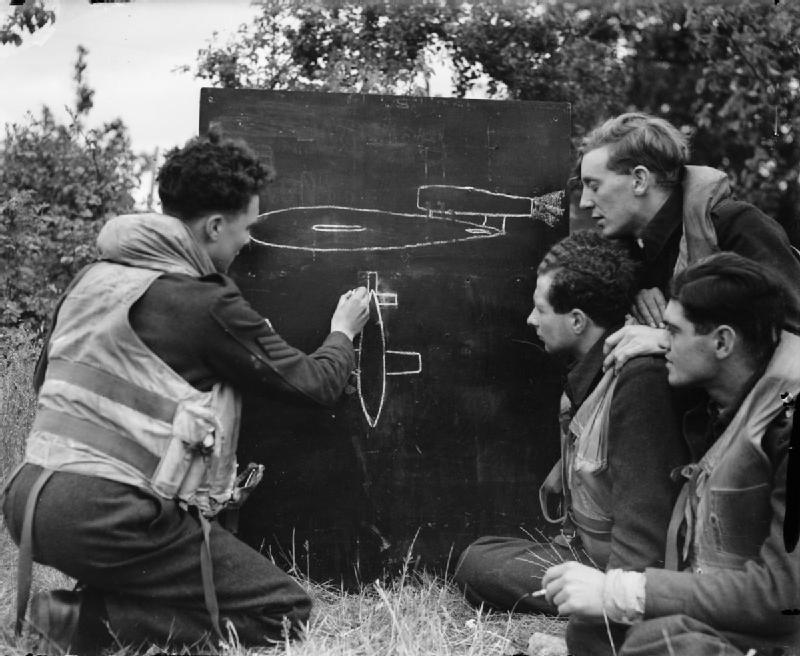
Tempest fighter pilots discuss tactics to deal with V-1s

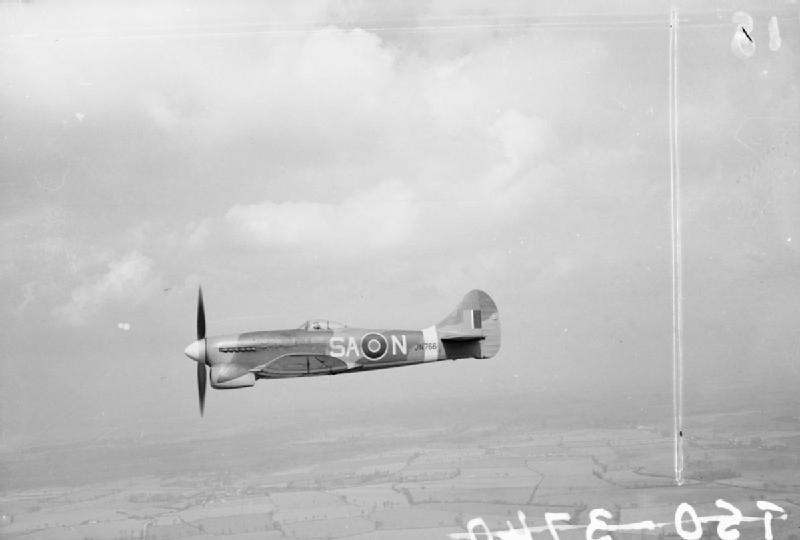
A Hawker Tempest in flight.

In 1944, Berry was posted to the elite Fighter Interception Unit (FIU) at RAF Wittering in East Anglia as a temporary squadron leader, and began flying night sorties against V-1s in single-engined Hawker Tempests and was awarded a Bar to his DFC on 1 September 1944.

Berry quickly became the pilot most successful in destroying V-1s. He claimed 52 in less than two months, including seven destroyed in one night, on 23 July 1944.

His successes were: 28 June 1944, 2 V-1s; 29 June 1944, V-1; 30 June 1944, 3 V-1s at night; 2 July 1944, V-1; 3 July 1944, V-1; 5 July 1944, 2 V-1s; 6 July 1944, 4 V-1s at night; 8 July 1944, 3 V-1s at night; 9 July 1944, V-1; 17 July 1944, 2 V-1s at night; 19 July 1944, 4 V-1s; 21 July 1944, V-1; 23 July 1944, 7 V-1s at night; 25 July 1944, 4 V-1s at night; 27 July 1944, shared V-1; 29 July 1944, 2 V-1s; 3 August 1944, 5 V-1s at night; 5 August 1944, 5 V-1s; 7 August 1944, 4 V-1s; 12 August 1944, 2 V-1s at night; 13 August 1944, V-1 at night; 15 August 1944, 2 V-1s at night; 20 August 1944, V-1; 31 August 1944, V-1.

On 23 August 1944 the Tempest flight from FIU was merged into an existing fighter unit, No. 501 Squadron RAF, at RAF Manston. Berry was appointed commanding officer of No. 501 Squadron.

For his service with No. 501 Squadron Berry was awarded a second Bar to his DFC, which was posthumously announced on 13 February 1946. His citation read:

Since the award of the Distinguished Flying Cross, this officer has flown on many operational sorties and has destroyed a further 41 flying bombs bringing his total to 58 bombs destroyed at night. On several occasions his aircraft has been damaged by the explosion of the bombs. As Squadron Commander, Squadron Leader Berry has displayed courage and devotion to duty of a high order and under his inspiring leadership the squadron has attained many successes.

== Death ==
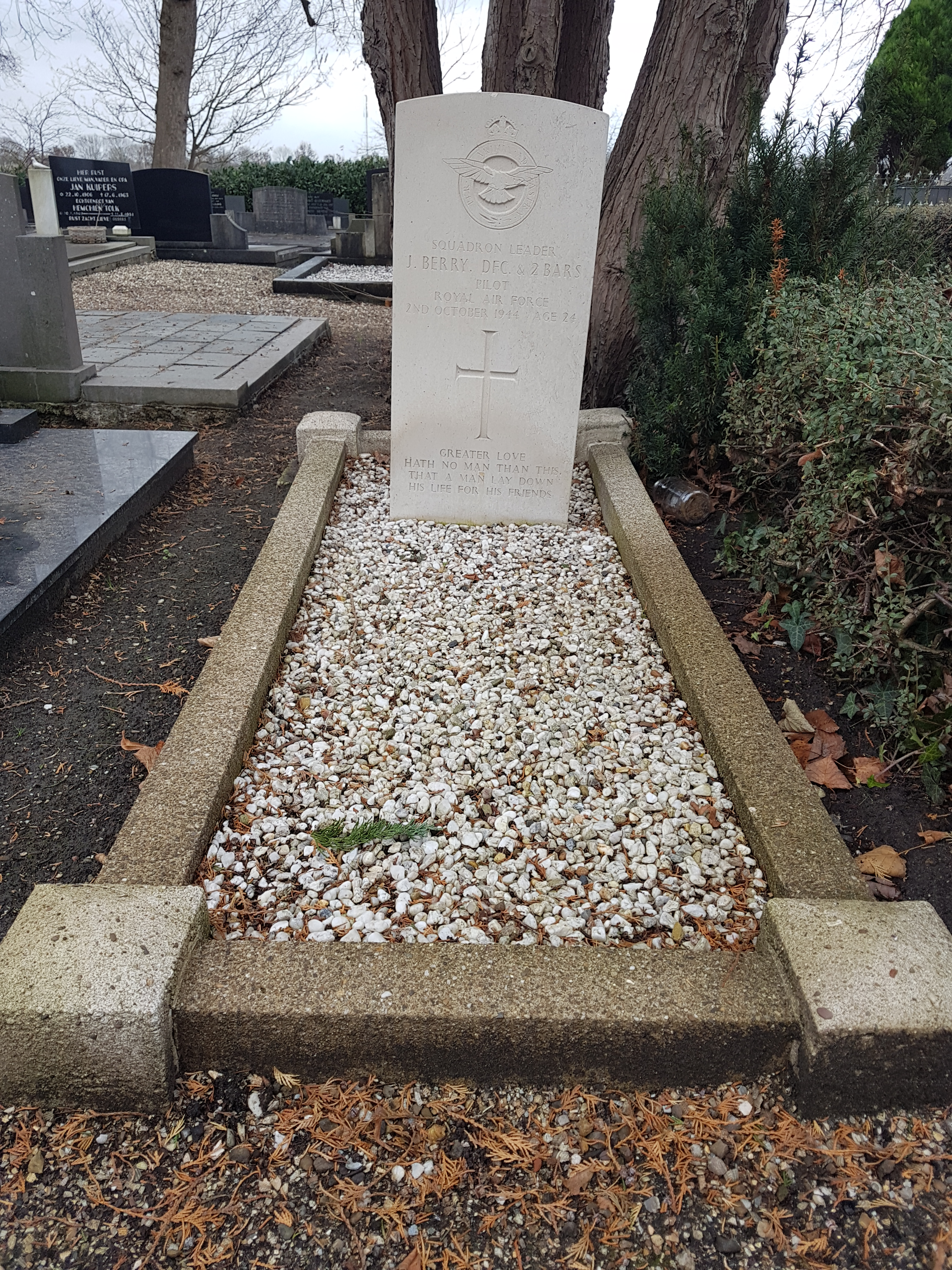
Grave of Joseph Berry at Scheemda Protestant Cemetery (Netherlands)

Allied ground forces began to overrun the V-1 launch sites and No. 501 Squadron began to undertake ground attack missions over the Netherlands and Germany.

On the morning of 2 October 1944 Berry was flying a "dawn ranger" patrol south-west of Assen in a Tempest Mark V (serial number EJ600, squadron code SD-F). His aircraft was hit by small arms fire while he was flying at 50 feet over Veendam, in Groningen, leading two other Tempests on a sortie against an airfield and rail yards near Bad Zwischenahn. His final radio message was "I've had it chaps; you go on." Berry was apparently flying too low to bail out and he was killed when his aircraft crashed near the hamlet of Kibbelgaarn.

Berry is buried in Scheemda Protestant Cemetery, Netherlands.

== Bibliography ==
- Bull, Stephen (2004). Encyclopedia of Military Technology and Innovation. Westport, Connecticut: Greenwood Publishing Group. ISBN 978-1-57356-557-8.
- Green, William (1961). War Planes of the Second World War: Fighters. Vol. 2. London: Macdonald & Company. OCLC 601569501.
- Franks, Norman (2000). Royal Air Force Fighter Command Losses. Vol. 3. Earl Shilton: Midland Counties. ISBN 1-85780-093-1.
- Foreman, John (1996). The Fighter Command War Diaries. Walton-on-Thames: Air Research. ISBN 1-871187-34-6.
- Foreman, John (2003). RAF Fighter Command Victory Claims. Part One. Walton-on-Thames: Red Kite. ISBN 0-9538061-8-9.
- Shores, Christopher (1999). Aces High, Vol 2. London: Grub Street. ISBN 1-898697-00-0.
- Jansen, Ab (1985). Gevleugeld Verleden. Netherlands: Forum Boekerij. ISBN 90-235-8099-0.
