= Fighter Interception Development Unit RAF =

The Fighter Interception Development Unit RAF was a special interceptor aircraft unit of the Royal Air Force (RAF) during the Second World War. It was part of Air Defence of Great Britain and was previously the Fighter Interception Unit (FIU).

== Origins ==
The Fighter Interception Unit was initially set up to evaluate technological advances such as aircraft interception (AI) radar and other operational innovations, to counter increasing night raids by the Luftwaffe. The unit was formed at RAF Tangmere in April 1940, under the command of Squadron Leader George Philip (Peter) Chamberlain, with a strength of 5 Blenheims equipped with the latest AI Mk III radars. Operations initially consisted of daytime practice interceptions and operational night defence flights. The night fighter Blenheims were directed several times to possible targets, in the early days of ground-controlled interception (GCI) to acquire and then maintain a radar contact and finally to intercept target proved a very difficult task.

== Initial combat success ==
On the night of the 22/23 July 1940, they achieved the first aircraft-interception radar kill in history. A Blenheim Mk IF flown by Flying Officer G. Ashfield, with a crew of Pilot Officer G.E. Morris (Observer) and Sergeant R.H. Leyland (AI radar operator), patrolled the Sussex coast at 10,000 ft (3,000 m). They were directed to a possible intercept by the controller at Poling Chain Home radar station who reported an incoming raid. Sgt. Leyland reported a response on the AI at a range of 8,000 feet and presently P/O Morris made a visual sighting of a Dornier Do 17 to port and below the Blenheim. Ashfield closed the distance to 400 feet and then opened fire. Strikes were observed on fuselage and engines, the Dornier lurched to starboard and fell away, 5 miles south of Bognor Regis. The aircraft, a Dornier 17Z of 2 Staffel, Kampfgeschwader 3, crashed into the sea and the crew was later rescued. The Blenheim was so close to the Dornier during the attack that the cockpit perspex was covered in oil, resulting in Ashfield losing control and the Blenheim flipping onto its back. He was able to regain control of the Blenheim at an altitude of 700 feet and landed at Tangmere just after midnight.

The unit was later also equipped with the Hurricane and were the first unit to receive the new Beaufighter (on 12 August 1940), still stationed at RAF Tangmere. Between 1940 and June 1944, some 21 victories were claimed by the FIU.

A FIU detachment was at RAF Newchurch to complement No. 150 Wing RAF with the Hawker Tempest V, where it tested Monica radar (known officially by the RAF as ARI 5664 and by the US military, as AN/APS 13), a range-determining, tail warning system, for night use. This special flight of Tempest V fighters was formed to counter the V-1 "Flying bombs" which had begun falling on south-east England. The flight operated mainly by night and claimed 86 ½ V-1s destroyed before being absorbed into 501 Squadron. The FIU's Squadron Leader Joseph Berry claimed 52 V-1s to become the RAF's top scorer against the flying bombs.

== Transition to Fighter Interception Development Squadron ==
On 23 August 1944, the FIU became the Fighter Interception Development Squadron (FIDS). By the latter war years the unit had become an element of the Night Fighter Development Wing (NFDW), which also included the Bomber Support Development Unit (BSDU) and the Fighter Experimental Flight (FEF), which specialised in "Ranger" (daylight intruder) operations with Mosquitoes. Two Westland Welkins served with the Fighter Interception Unit from May to November 1944, where they were used to evaluate suitability for high-altitude fighter operations. A two-seat night fighter version – the Welkin NF Mk II – was also evaluated, but the type was not ordered into production. During the closing months of the war the BSDU claimed four victories, the FIDS two victories, and the FEF eight victories plus a large number of aircraft destroyed on the ground.

In late 1944, the Fighter Interception Development Squadron (of the Night Fighter Development Wing) carried out operational trials at RAF Ford (and later Manston) under the code name Operation Vapour to counter Heinkel He 111 H-22 aircraft of III/KG 53 air launching V-1 flying bombs. A radar-equipped Vickers Wellington was modified for use by the Fighter Interception Unit as one of the first Airborne Early Warning and Control (AEW&C) aircraft. It operated at an altitude of 4,000 feet over the North Sea to control Mosquito night fighters intercepting the Heinkel He 111s flying from Dutch airbases and carrying out airborne launches of the V-1 flying bomb. The modus operandi typically involved the Heinkels leaving bases in the Netherlands and flying out over the North Sea at a height of less than 300 ft (91 m). Once the Heinkels neared the East Anglian coast they would increase speed and release their flying bombs before turning for home at low level. To assist in detecting the Heinkels the Fighter Interception Development Squadron borrowed a Coastal Command Wellington equipped with a modified ASV Mk VI radar set and PPI to act as Airborne Early Warning and Control. After trials, low level night patrols off the north of the Netherlands were carried out by the Wellington with several Mosquito night fighters. For the night fighters to locate and keep station with the Wellington, the aircraft was fitted with a special homing beacon. Despite encouraging results, the Luftwaffe stopped air launches by mid January 1945 and the operational trials ended.

== Bases ==
- RAF Tangmere 18 April to 20 August 1940
- RAF Shoreham 20 August 1940 to 1 February 1941
- RAF Ford 1 February 1941 to 3 April 1944
- RAF Wittering 3 April to 23 August 1944
