= Gravesend Airport =

- IATA: none; ICAO: none

Summary
- Airport type: Civilian / Military
- Location: Gravesend, Kent
- Built: 1932
- In use: 1932-1956
- Coordinates: 51°25′05″N 000°23′47″E

Map
- Location in Kent

Runways
Direction	Length		Surface
Direction	ft	m	Surface
01/19	5,400	1,645.9	Grass
07/25	4,400	1,341.12	Grass

Gravesend Airport, located 2.5 miles (4.0 km) southeast of Gravesend town centre, Kent and 7.0 miles (11.3 km) west of Rochester. It was operated from 1932 until 1956. It was initially a civil airfield, and became a Royal Air Force station known as RAF Gravesend during the Second World War, when it was under the control of RAF Fighter Command during the Battle of Britain. It was the first RAF station to operate the North American Mustang III. The airport returned to civilian use at the conclusion of the Second World War, although it remained under the ownership of the Air Ministry until its closure in 1956.

== Civil operation ==
The airport was operated by Gravesend Aviation Ltd served Gravesend and has a significant place in the history of British aviation. From 1933 to 1936 it was home to Percival Aircraft, building the famous Mew Gull racing aircraft among others, before the company moved to Luton. After 1936 Essex Aero was based on the site, and maintained the airfield's link with racing aeroplanes by preparing the de Havilland DH.88 Comets and Alex Henshaw's Percival Mew Gull that set the record for a flight from England to South Africa.

The airfield received Customs facilities in December 1933 and many European airlines made use of Gravesend as a diversionary airport when Croydon was fogged-in. These airlines included Imperial Airways, KLM, Sabena and Deutsche Luft Hansa.

== Royal Air Force ==
The Royal Air Force moved into Gravesend in 1937 when a Flying Training School began operating de Havilland Tiger Moths and Hawker Harts at the airfield. In 1942, the RAF greatly enlarged the airfield, which included major extensions to both runways – albeit still formed of grass. Throughout the Second World War, Essex Aero continued to manufacture aircraft parts at the site. Accommodation for personnel was provided nearby at Ashenbank Wood. The company also drew up major plans for the airfield, including concreting the runways (the longest one being just over 5600 ft after the RAF extensions), a new terminal and cargo centre west of the Thong Lane side and their aircraft parts main plant to the east of Thong Lane.

When the RAF requisitioned the entire aerodrome in 1939 at the beginning of the war they made it a sector airfield for Biggin Hill, as one of the airfields of 11 Group. The first squadron to occupy Gravesend was 32 Squadron, arriving on 3 January 1940 with its Hawker Hurricane fighters, being replaced by 610 Squadron on 27 May. These were followed by another Auxiliary Squadron, 604, which operated Bristol Blenheims as night fighters from 3 July. 501 and 66 Squadrons also flew from here during the 1940 Battle of Britain, arriving on 25 July and 10 September respectively. A 501 Sqdn pilot, "Ginger" Lacey, was one of the RAF's most successful pilots during the Battle of Britain.

Many other units also occupied the station during the war years, such as 71 Squadron, which arrived 14 August 1942 for the Dieppe Raid, 92 Squadron (24 September 1941). No. 306 Polish Fighter Squadron, arriving 11 August 1943 and 65 Squadron, which arrived 29 July 1943, and was the first Squadron to be issued with the North American Mustang III in December – making Gravesend the first RAF base to operate it.

Accommodation was split between Cobham Hall (officers mess), the control tower (some pilots), and the 'Laughing Waters' restaurant (groundcrews), while aircraft were dispersed around the perimeter. Air defence was supplied by the army, and the airfield was attacked only a few times – on 2 September 1940 two soldiers were killed when a pair of bombs were dropped, and on the 4th an attack was mounted by a force of Heinkel He 111s, but was aborted. Two more attacks came, but neither managed to hit the airfield itself.

The airfield was extended later in the war to accommodate three squadrons of American fighters, and it was also used as an emergency runway for bomber aircraft returning from sorties over the continent. After the war, Gravesend Aerodrome largely returned to civilian use, with the RAF finally leaving in 1956, whereupon Gravesend airfield became a housing estate. All that there is to see now is a plaque in a local sports centre listing the names of fifteen pilots killed in action whilst flying from this small field.

=== Squadrons based for periods ===
- No. 32 Squadron RAF from 3 January 1940
- No. 610 (County of Chester) Squadron AAF from 27 May 1940
- No. 604 (County of Middlesex) Squadron AAF from 3 July 1940
- No. 501 (County of Gloucester) Squadron AAF from 25 July 1940
- No. 66 Squadron RAF from 10 September 1940
- No. 92 (East India) Squadron RAF from 24 September 1941
- No. 65 (East India) Squadron RAF from 29 July 1942
- No. 71 (Eagle) Squadron RAF from 14 August 1942
- No. 306 Polish Fighter Squadron from 11 August 1943

The following squadrons were also here at some point:

- No. 2 Squadron RAF
- No. 4 Squadron RAF
- No. 19 Squadron RAF
- No. 21 Squadron RAF
- No. 56 (Punjab) Squadron RAF
- No. 64 Squadron RAF
- No. 72 Squadron RAF
- No. 74 (Trinidad)
- No. 85 Squadron RAF
- No. 111 Squadron RAF
- No. 122 (Bombay) Squadron RAF
- No. 124 (Baroda) Squadron RAF
- No. 132 (City of Bombay) Squadron RAF
- No. 133 (Eagle) Squadron RAF
- No. 141 Squadron RAF
- No. 165 (Ceylon) Squadron RAF
- No. 174 (Mauritius) Squadron RAF
- No. 181 Squadron RAF
- No. 193 (Fellowship of the Bellows) Squadron RAF
- No. 232 Squadron RAF
- No. 245 (Northern Rhodesian) Squadron RAF
- No. 247 (China-British) Squadron RAF
- No. 257 (Burma) Squadron RAF
- No. 264 (Madras Presidency) Squadron RAF
- No. 266 (Rhodesia) Squadron RAF
- No. 277 Squadron RAF
- No. 284 Squadron RAF
- No. 350 (Belgian) Squadron RAF
- No. 401 Squadron RCAF
- No. 464 Squadron RAAF
- No. 487 Squadron RNZAF
- No. 609 (West Riding) Squadron AAF
- No. 949 (Balloon) Squadron
- No. 966 (Balloon) Squadron
- No. 997 (Balloon) Squadron

Units

- No. 3 Maintenance Unit RAF
- No. 20 Elementary and Reserve Flying Training School RAF
- No. 111 'P' Balloon Flight
- No. 112 'P' Balloon Flight
- No. 122 Airfield Headquarters RAF became No. 122 (Rocket Projectile) Wing RAF
- No. 125 Airfield Headquarters RAF
- No. 140 Airfield Headquarters RAF became No. 140 (Bomber) Wing RAF
- No. 141 Gliding School RAF
- No. 149 Gliding School RAF
- No. 212 Maintenance Unit RAF
- No. 421 (Reconnaissance) Flight RAF
- No. 1493 (Fighter) Gunnery Flight RAF became No. 18 Armament Practice Camp RAF
- No. 2707 Squadron RAF Regiment
- No. 2728 Squadron RAF Regiment
- No. 2740 Squadron RAF Regiment
- No. 2791 Squadron RAF Regiment
- No. 2819 Squadron RAF Regiment
- No. 2952 Squadron RAF Regiment
- No. 3205 Servicing Commando
- No. 3207 Servicing Commando
- No. 4065 Anti-Aircraft Flight RAF Regiment

== Approval for civilian use ==
In 1954, the Air Ministry had to decide whether the civil airport should be retained and substantially enlarged, or the extensions east of Thong Lane be released for residential development. Kent County Council had made it clear that the land west of Thong Lane, was identified as a Civil Airport. Additionally, Kent County Council also informed the Air Ministry, that it would neither support nor oppose enlargement, acknowledging, however, that it would as a result of any such enlargement, the site becoming designated as a fully operational international airport.

After the war, the then Gravesend Municipal Council gave planning permission to Essex Aero to take over the airport, but with severe (and unworkable) conditions. The main conditions were that the RAF extensions must be ripped up, thereby reducing the airport size by 40%; that the two runway lengths cut back to just 3000 ft; and finally, provisions that a school and associated housing should be built on parts of the airfield. Under those circumstances, Essex Aero did not continue with its scheme.

== Today ==
The airfield site today has become a housing estate called Riverview Park; little can be identified of the original use. Leander Drive & Vigilant Way were built quite a distance in-field from the former perimeter track, which ran east–west, almost where Astra Drive now runs to the southern edge of Riverview Park. To the west and north, it followed a line almost where the existing boundary of Riverview Park Estate now stands and to the east, it ran almost adjacent to Thong Lane. The main entrance to the airport, leading to the control tower & hangars was roughly where the existing mini-roundabout in Thong Lane now is.

On the eastern side of Thong Lane, where the leisure centre and golf club now occupy the site was the eastern wartime extension to the airfield. The perimeter track ran east from Thong Lane from a point roughly opposite Vigilant Way to the south, extended towards Shorne for about half a mile, before looping northwards and then north-east towards what is now the Leisure Centre, before finally crossing Thong Lane to link up with the peri track on the west of Thong Lane roughly where Leander Drive now is situated.

The current approach road to the leisure centre does follow the line of the perimeter track.

"Cascades" Leisure Centre in Thong Lane has a plaque dedicated to the airmen of World War II who served at Gravesend Airport. The Control Tower from the Airport was located across the road from the grounds. The Stand By Set House (Emergency Generator Building) stands in the field immediately to the north of Cascades surrounded by two modern-day barns whilst there is a small piece of the tarmac outer perimeter-track left in the fields behind Astra Drive. But this has fallen into disrepair. These are all that remain of the entire airfield. In addition, two buildings in Stacey Close off Valley Drive (The Stork at Rest Pub and the building opposite) housed the airfield's sick quarters.

== See also ==
- List of former Royal Air Force stations
