= Bétheniville =

- Commune
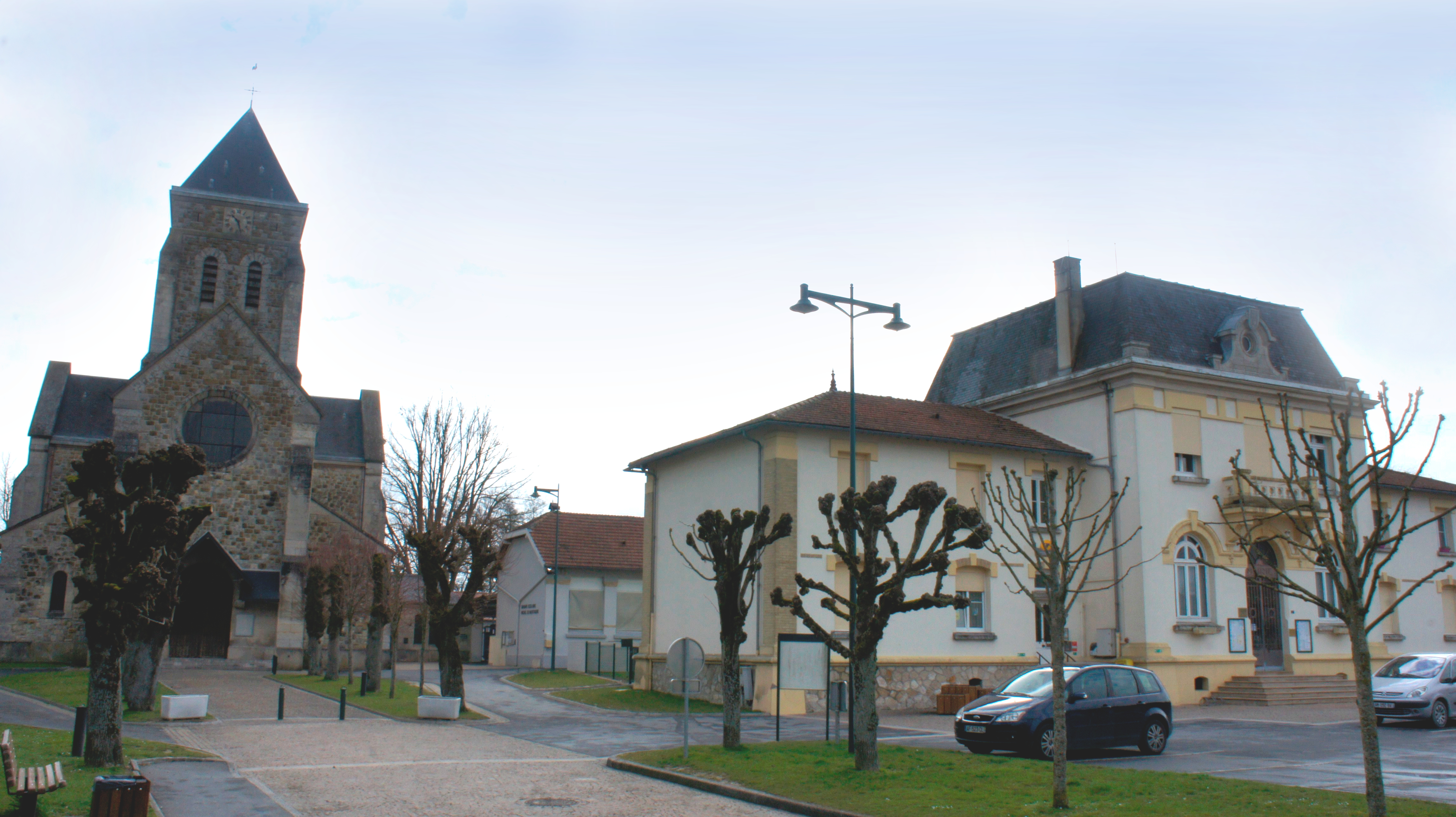
- The church and town hall in Bétheniville

- Coat of arms
- Location of Bétheniville
- Location within France Location within Grand Est
- Coordinates: 49°17′38″N 4°22′05″E
- Country: France
- Region: Grand Est
- Department: Marne
- Arrondissement: Reims
- Canton: Mourmelon-Vesle et Monts de Champagne
- Intercommunality: CU Grand Reims

Government
  - Mayor (2020–2026): Jean-Jacques Gouault
- Area^{1}: 17.74 km^{2} (6.85 sq mi)
- Elevation: 100 m (330 ft)
- Population (2023): 1,259
  - Density: 70.97/km^{2} (183.8/sq mi)
- Time zone: UTC+01:00 (CET)
  - Summer (DST): UTC+02:00 (CEST)
- INSEE/Postal code: 51054 /51490
- ^{1} French Land Register data, which excludes lakes, ponds, glaciers > 1 km^{2} (0.386 sq mi or 247 acres) and river estuaries.

Bétheniville (French pronunciation: [betnivil]) is a commune in the Marne department in northeastern France.

== Geography ==
The commune is traversed by the Suippe river.

== Population ==
Historical population
Year	Pop.	±% p.a.
1968	773	—
1975	727	−0.87%
1982	803	+1.43%
1990	843	+0.61%
1999	851	+0.11%
2007	984	+1.83%
2012	1,233	+4.61%
2017	1,275	+0.67%
2023	1,259	−0.21%
Source: INSEE

== See also ==
- Communes of the Marne department
