= List of Reserve flying schools =

This is a List of Reserve flying schools of the Royal Air Force

== Elementary and Reserve Flying Training Schools ==
Unit	Formed on	Formed at	Disbanded on	Disbanded at	Operated by	Fate
No. 1 Elementary and Reserve Flying Training School	4 August 1935	Hatfield	3 September 1939	Hatfield	de Havilland Aircraft Co	No. 1 Elementary Flying Training School
No. 2 Elementary and Reserve Flying Training School	1935	Filton	3 September 1939	Filton	Bristol Aeroplane Co Ltd	No. 2 Elementary Flying Training School
No. 3 Elementary and Reserve Flying Training School	1935	Hamble	3 September 1939	Hamble	Air Service Training Ltd	No. 3 Elementary Flying Training School
No. 4 Elementary and Reserve Flying Training School	1935	Brough	3 September 1939	Brough	North Sea Aerial & General Transport Co Ltd	No. 4 Elementary Flying Training School
No. 5 Elementary and Reserve Flying Training School	1935	Hanworth	3 September 1939	Hanworth	Flying Training Ltd then Blackburn Aircraft Ltd	No. 5 Elementary Flying Training School
No. 6 Elementary and Reserve Flying Training School	10 June 1935	Sywell	3 September 1939	Sywell	Brooklands Aviation Ltd	No. 6 Elementary Flying Training School
No. 7 Elementary and Reserve Flying Training School	25 November 1935	Desford	3 September 1939	Unknown	Reid & Sigrist Ltd	No. 7 Elementary Flying Training School
No. 8 Elementary and Reserve Flying Training School	25 November 1935	Woodley	3 September 1939	Woodley	Phillips & Powis Ltd	No. 8 Elementary Flying Training School
No. 9 Elementary and Reserve Flying Training School	6 January 1936	Ansty	3 September 1939	Ansty	Air Service Training Ltd	No. 9 Elementary Flying Training School
No. 10 Elementary and Reserve Flying Training School	1 January 1936	Filton	3 September 1939	Filton	Bristol Aeroplane Co Ltd	No. 10 Elementary Flying Training School
No. 11 Elementary and Reserve Flying Training School	27 January 1936	Scone	3 September 1939	Scone	Airwork Ltd	No. 11 Elementary Flying Training School
No. 12 Elementary and Reserve Flying Training School	17 February 1936	Prestwick	3 September 1939	Prestwick	Scottish Aviation Ltd	No. 12 Elementary Flying Training School
No. 13 Elementary and Reserve Flying Training School	18 November 1935	White Waltham	3 September 1939	White Waltham	de Havilland Co Ltd	No. 13 Elementary Flying Training School
No. 14 Elementary and Reserve Flying Training School	1 July 1937	Castle Bromwich	3 September 1939	Castle Bromwich	Airwork Ltd	No. 14 Elementary Flying Training School
No. 15 Elementary and Reserve Flying Training School	1 July 1937	Redhill	3 September 1939	Redhill	British Air Transport Ltd	No. 15 Elementary Flying Training School
No. 16 Elementary and Reserve Flying Training School	3 July 1937	Shoreham	3 September 1939	Shoreham	Martin School of Air Navigation then Brooklands Aviation Ltd	Disbanded
No. 17 Elementary and Reserve Flying Training School	1 October 1937	Barton	2 September 1939	Barton	Airwork Ltd	Disbanded
No. 18 Elementary and Reserve Flying Training School	1 October 1937	Fairoaks	3 September 1939	Fairoaks	Universal Flying Services Ltd	No. 18 Elementary Flying Training School
No. 19 Elementary and Reserve Flying Training School	1 October 1937	Gatwick	3 September 1939	Gatwick	Airports Ltd	No. 18 Elementary Flying Training School
No. 20 Elementary and Reserve Flying Training School	1 October 1937	Gravesend	3 September 1939	Gravesend	Airports Ltd	No. 14 Elementary Flying Training School
No. 21 Elementary and Reserve Flying Training School	1 January 1938	Stapleford Abbotts	3 September 1939	Stapleford Abbotts	Reid & Sigrist Ltd	Disbanded
No. 22 Elementary and Reserve Flying Training School	1 February 1938	Cambridge	3 September 1939	Cambridge	Marshalls Ltd	No. 22 Elementary Flying Training School
No. 23 Elementary and Reserve Flying Training School	1 April 1938	Rochester	3 September 1939	Sydenham	Short Bros Ltd	No. 24 Elementary Flying Training School
No. 24 Elementary and Reserve Flying Training School	1 January 1939	Sydenham	3 September 1939	Sydenham	Short Bros (Rochester & Bedford) Ltd	No. 24 Elementary Flying Training School
No. 25 Elementary and Reserve Flying Training School	24 June 1938	Waltham	3 September 1939	Waltham	Herts & Essex Aero Club Ltd	Disbanded
No. 26 Elementary and Reserve Flying Training School	24 June 1938	Kidlington	2 September 1939	Kidlington	Marshalls Ltd	Disbanded
No. 27 Elementary and Reserve Flying Training School	24 June 1938	Tollerton	3 September 1939	Tollerton	Nottingham Airport Ltd	Disbanded
No. 28 Elementary and Reserve Flying Training School	1 August 1938	Meir	3 September 1939	Meir	Reid & Sigrist Ltd	Disbanded
No. 29 Elementary and Reserve Flying Training School	1 August 1938	Luton	3 September 1939	Luton	Birkett Air Services Ltd	Disbanded
No. 30 Elementary and Reserve Flying Training School	29 September 1938	Burnaston	3 September 1939	Burnaston	Air Schools Ltd	No. 30 Elementary Flying Training School
No. 31 Elementary and Reserve Flying Training School	29 September 1938	Cheltenham	3 September 1939	Cheltenham	Surrey Flying Services Ltd	Disbanded
No. 32 Elementary and Reserve Flying Training School	15 April 1939	Greatham	3 September 1939	Greatham	Portsmouth, Southsea & Isle of Wight Aviation Ltd	Disbanded
No. 33 Elementary and Reserve Flying Training School	3 December 1938	Whitchurch	2 September 1939	Whitchurch	Chamier, Gilbert Lodge & Co Ltd	Disbanded
No. 34 Elementary and Reserve Flying Training School	1 January 1939	Rochford	3 September 1939	Rochford	Air Hire Ltd	Disbanded
No. 35 Elementary and Reserve Flying Training School	1 May 1939	Grangemouth	3 September 1939	Grangemouth	Scottish Aviation Ltd	Disbanded
No. 37 Elementary and Reserve Flying Training School	3 July 1939	Exeter	3 September 1939	Exeter	Straight Corporation Ltd	Disbanded
No. 38 Elementary and Reserve Flying Training School	1 July 1939	Kingstown	3 September 1939	Kingstown	Border Flying Club	Disbanded
No. 39 Elementary and Reserve Flying Training School	3 July 1939	Weston-super-Mare	3 September 1939	Weston-super-Mare	Straight Corporation Ltd	Disbanded
No. 40 Elementary and Reserve Flying Training School	15 August 1939	Mousehold	2 September 1939	Mousehold	Air Contractors Ltd	Disbanded
No. 42 Elementary and Reserve Flying Training School	1 August 1939	Blackpool	2 September 1939	Blackpool	Reid & Sigrist Ltd	Disbanded
No. 43 Elementary and Reserve Flying Training School	1 June 1939	Woolsington	2 September 1939	Woolsington	Newcastle Flying Club	Disbanded
No. 44 Elementary and Reserve Flying Training School	1 May 1939	Elmdon	2 September 1939	Elmdon	Airwork Ltd	Disbanded
No. 45 Elementary and Reserve Flying Training School	3 July 1939	Ipswich	2 September 1939	Ipswich	Straight Corporation Ltd	Disbanded
No. 46 Elementary and Reserve Flying Training School	1 August 1939	Roborough	2 September 1939	Portsmouth	Portsmouth, Southsea & Isle of Wight Aviation Ltd	Disbanded
No. 47 Elementary and Reserve Flying Training School	15 July 1939	Doncaster	2 September 1939	Doncaster	Nottingham Airport Ltd	Disbanded
No. 50 Elementary and Reserve Flying Training School	June 1939	Ringway	2 September 1939	Ringway	Airwork Ltd	Disbanded
No. 56 Elementary and Reserve Flying Training School	24 August 1939	Kenley	2 September 1939	Kenley	British Air Transport Ltd	Disbanded

== Elementary Flying Training Schools ==
Unit	Formed on	Formed at	Disbanded on	Disbanded at	Fate
No. 1 Elementary Flying Training School RAF	3 September 1939	Hatfield	5 May 1947	Panshanger	No. 1 Reserve Flying School RAF
No. 1 Elementary Flying Training School RAF	11 July 2003	Barkston Heath			
No. 2 Elementary Flying Training School RAF	3 September 1939	Filton	1 November 1941	Filton	No. 6 (Supplementary) Flying Instructors School RAF
No. 2 Elementary Flying Training School RAF	22 July 1942	Worcester	30 September 1947	Yatesbury	Disbanded
No. 3 Elementary Flying Training School RAF	3 September 1939	Hamble	31 March 1948	Shellingford	Disbanded
No. 4 Elementary Flying Training School RAF	3 September 1939	Brough	10 March 1947	Brough	No. 4 Reserve Flying School RAF
No. 5 Elementary Flying Training School RAF	3 September 1939	Hanworth	23 December 1941	Meir	Disbanded
No. 6 Elementary Flying Training School RAF	3 September 1939	Sywell	12 May 1947	Sywell	No. 6 Reserve Flying School RAF
No. 7 Elementary Flying Training School RAF	3 September 1939	Desford	9 May 1947	Desford	No. 7 Reserve Flying School RAF
No. 8 Elementary Flying Training School RAF	3 September 1939	Woodley	15 October 1942	Woodley	Disbanded
No. 8 Elementary Flying Training School RAF	7 May 1946	Woodley	3 March 1947	Woodley	No. 8 Reserve Flying School RAF
No. 9 Elementary Flying Training School RAF	3 September 1939	Ansty	31 March 1944	Ansty	Disbanded
No. 10 Elementary Flying Training School RAF	3 September 1939	Filton	21 July 1942	Stoke Orchard	Disbanded
No. 11 Elementary Flying Training School RAF	3 September 1939	Scone	18 March 1947	Scone	No. 11 Reserve Flying School RAF
No. 12 Elementary Flying Training School RAF	3 September 1939	Prestwick	22 March 1941	Prestwick	Disbanded
No. 13 Elementary Flying Training School RAF	3 September 1939	White Waltham	1 June 1941	Peterborough	Disbanded
No. 14 Elementary Flying Training School RAF	3 September 1939	Castle Bromwich	1 February 1946	Elmdon	Disbanded
No. 15 Elementary Flying Training School RAF	3 September 1939	Redhill	31 December 1947	Kingstown	Disbanded
No. 16 Elementary Flying Training School RAF	10 April 1940	Burnaston	27 March 1947	Burnaston	No. 16 Reserve Flying School RAF
No. 17 Elementary Flying Training School RAF	18 January 1941	North Luffenham	1 June 1942	Peterborough	Disbanded
No. 18 Elementary Flying Training School RAF	3 September 1939	Fairoaks	14 May 1947	Fairoaks	No. 18 Reserve Flying School RAF
No. 19 Elementary Flying Training School RAF	21 January 1941	Sealand	31 December 1942	Sealand	Disbanded
No. 20 Elementary Flying Training School RAF	1 March 1941	Yeadon	9 January 1942	Yeadon	Disbanded
No. 21 Elementary Flying Training School RAF	1 June 1941	Booker	28 February 1950	Booker	Disbanded
No. 22 Elementary Flying Training School RAF	3 September 1939	Cambridge	1 May 1947	Cambridge	No. 22 Reserve Flying School RAF
No. 24 Elementary Flying Training School RAF	3 September 1939	Sydenham	7 May 1947	Rochester	No. 24 Reserve Flying School RAF
No. 25 (Polish) Elementary Flying Training School RAF	1 June 1941	Peterborough	1 November 1945	Hucknall	Disbanded into No. 6 (Polish) Flying Training School
No. 26 Elementary Flying Training School RAF	14 August 1941	Theale	9 July 1945	Theale	Disbanded
No. 28 Elementary Flying Training School RAF	15 September 1941	Wolverhampton	26 June 1947	Wolverhampton	No. 25 Reserve Flying School RAF
No. 29 Elementary Flying Training School RAF	13 September 1941	Clyffe Pypard	5 November 1947	Clyffe Pypard	Disbanded into No. 21 EFTS
No. 30 Elementary Flying Training School RAF	3 September 1939	Burnaston	10 April 1940	Burnaston	Became No. 16 EFTS
Elementary Flying Training Squadron RAF	1 June 1987	Swinderby	1 April 1993	Swinderby	Disbanded

Overseas

Unit	Formed on	Formed at	Disbanded on	Disbanded at	Fate
Elementary Flying Training School (Kenya) RAF	21 August 1940	Eastleigh	11 November 1940	Eastleigh	No. 30 EFTS (Kenya) RAF
No. 1 Elementary Flying Training School (India) RAF	1940	Begumpet	10 July 1945	Begumpet	Disbanded
No. 2 Elementary Flying Training School (India) RAF	1 May 1942	Jodhpur	1 June 1947	Jodhpur	EFTS (RIAF)
No. 25 Elementary Flying Training School (Southern Rhodesia) RAF	25 May 1940	Belvedere	3 November 1944	Belvedere	Disbanded
No. 26 Elementary Flying Training School (Southern Rhodesia) RAF	8 August 1940	Guinea Fowl	14 August 1945	Guinea Fowl	Disbanded
No. 27 Elementary Flying Training School (Southern Rhodesia) RAF	2 February 1941	Induna	21 September 1945	Induna	Disbanded
No. 28 Elementary Flying Training School (Southern Rhodesia) RAF	1 April 1941	Mount Hampden	30 October 1945	Mount Hampden	Disbanded
No. 30 Elementary Flying Training School (Kenya) RAF	11 November 1940	Eastleigh	13 March 1941	Eastleigh	Disbanded
No. 31 Elementary Flying Training School (Canada) RAF	10 May 1941	Calgary	25 September 1944	De Winton	Disbanded
No. 32 Elementary Flying Training School (Canada) RAF	2 June 1941	Swift Current	8 September 1944	Bowden	Disbanded
No. 33 Elementary Flying Training School (Canada) RAF	7 December 1941	Caron	14 January 1944	Caron	No. 18 EFTS RCAF
No. 34 Elementary Flying Training School (Canada) RAF	2 February 1942	Assiniboia	30 January 1944	Assiniboia	No. 25 EFTS RCAF
No. 35 Elementary Flying Training School (Canada) RAF	24 February 1942	Nespawa	30 January 1944	Nespawa	No. 26 EFTS RCAF
No. 36 Elementary Flying Training School (Canada) RAF	17 March 1942	Pearce	14 August 1942	Pearce	Disbanded

== Reserve Flying Schools ==
Unit	Formed on	Formed at	Disbanded on	Disbanded at	Operated by	Fate
Reserve Flying School, Brough	21 May 1924	Brough	1935	Brough	North Sea Aerial & General Transport Co Ltd	No. 4 Elementary and Reserve Flying Training School
Reserve Flying School, Coventry	31 July 1923	Coventry	1 April 1931	Hamble		Disbanded
Reserve Flying School, Filton	28 May 1923	Filton	1935	Filton	Bristol Aeroplane Co Ltd	No. 2 Elementary and Reserve Flying Training School
Reserve Flying School, Hamble	1 April 1931	Hamble	1935	Hamble	Air Service Training Ltd	No. 3 Elementary and Reserve Flying Training School
Reserve Flying School, Renfrew	24 July 1924	Renfrew	3 November 1928	Renfrew		Disbanded
Reserve Flying School, Stag Lane	1 May 1923	Stag Lane	4 August 1935	Hatfield	de Havilland Aircraft Co Ltd	No. 1 Elementary and Reserve Flying Training School
No. 1 Reserve Flying School	5 May 1947	Panshanger	31 March 1953	Panshanger	de Havilland Aircraft Co Ltd	Disbanded
No. 2 Reserve Flying School	1 October 1948	Barton	31 March 1953	Barton	Reid & Sigrist Ltd then Short Bros & Harland Ltd	Disbanded
No. 3 Reserve Flying School	15 August 1948	Cardiff	31 July 1953	Cardiff	British Aviation Services then Cambrian Air Services Ltd	Disbanded
No. 4 Reserve Flying School	10 March 1947	Brough	31 March 1948	Brough	Blackburn Aircraft Ltd	Disbanded
No. 5 Reserve Flying School	1 November 1947	Castle Bromwich	20 June 1954	Castle Bromwich	Birketts Air Services Ltd	Disbanded
No. 6 Reserve Flying School	12 May 1947	Sywell	31 March 1953	Sywell	Brooklands Aviation Ltd	Disbanded
No. 7 Reserve Flying School	9 May 1947	Desford	31 July 1953	Desford	Reid & Sigrist Ltd	Disbanded
No. 8 Reserve Flying School	3 March 1947	Woodley	31 March 1953	Woodley	Handley Page (Reading) Ltd	Disbanded
No. 9 Reserve Flying School	1 November 1947	Doncaster	20 June 1954	Doncaster	C.L.Air Surveys Ltd	Disbanded
No. 10 Reserve Flying School	16 May 1949	Exeter	20 June 1954	Exeter	Exeter Airport Ltd	Disbanded
No. 11 Reserve Flying School	18 March 1947	Scone	20 June 1954	Perth	Airwork Ltd	Disbanded
No. 12 Reserve Flying School	1 April 1948	Filton	31 March 1953	Filton	Bristol Aeroplane Ltd	Disbanded
No. 13 Reserve Flying School	1 April 1948	Grangemouth	19 April 1949	Grangemouth	Airwork Ltd	Disbanded
No. 14 Reserve Flying School	15 August 1947	Hamble	15 August 1953	Hamble	Air Service Training Ltd	Disbanded
No. 15 Reserve Flying School	1 April 1948	Redhill	20 June 1954	Redhill	British Air Transport Ltd	Disbanded
No. 16 Reserve Flying School	27 March 1947	Burnaston	30 June 1953	Burnaston	Air Schools Ltd	Disbanded
No. 17 Reserve Flying School	1 July 1948	Hornchurch	31 July 1953	Hornchurch	Short Bros & Harland Ltd	Disbanded
No. 18 Reserve Flying School	14 May 1947	Fairoaks	31 July 1953	Fairoaks	Universal Flying Services Ltd	Disbanded
No. 19 Reserve Flying School	10 July 1950	Hooton Park	20 June 1954	Woodvale	Short Bros & Harland Ltd	Disbanded
No. 22 Reserve Flying School	1 May 1947	Cambridge	20 June 1954	Cambridge	Marshalls Flying School Ltd	Disbanded
No. 23 Reserve Flying School	1 February 1949	Usworth	31 July 1953	Usworth	Airwork Ltd	Disbanded
No. 24 Reserve Flying School	7 May 1947	Rochester	31 March 1953	Rochester	Short Bros & Harland Ltd	Disbanded
No. 25 Reserve Flying School	26 June 1947	Wolverhampton	31 March 1953	Wolverhampton	Air Schools Ltd	Disbanded
Reserve Training Squadron	15 October 1952	Scampton	1 May 1953	Scampton	Formed from 230 OCU	Disbanded
