= Henry Burke =

Henry Burke may refer to:

- Henry Farnham Burke (1859–1930), Anglo-Irish genealogist and officer of arms
- Henry Burke (politician) (died 1827), member of the House of Assembly of Jamaica
- Sir Henry Burke, 7th Baronet (died 1748) of the Burke Baronets
- Sir Henry John Burke, 9th Baronet (died 1814) of the Burke Baronets
- Sir Henry George Burke, 5th Baronet (1859–1910) of the Burke Baronets
- Henry Lardner-Burke (1916–1970), South African flying ace

== See also ==
- Burke (surname)
