= Vassincourt Airfield =

Former airfield in France

Vassincourt Airfield
- Bar-le-Duc
- Vassincourt, Grand Est in France
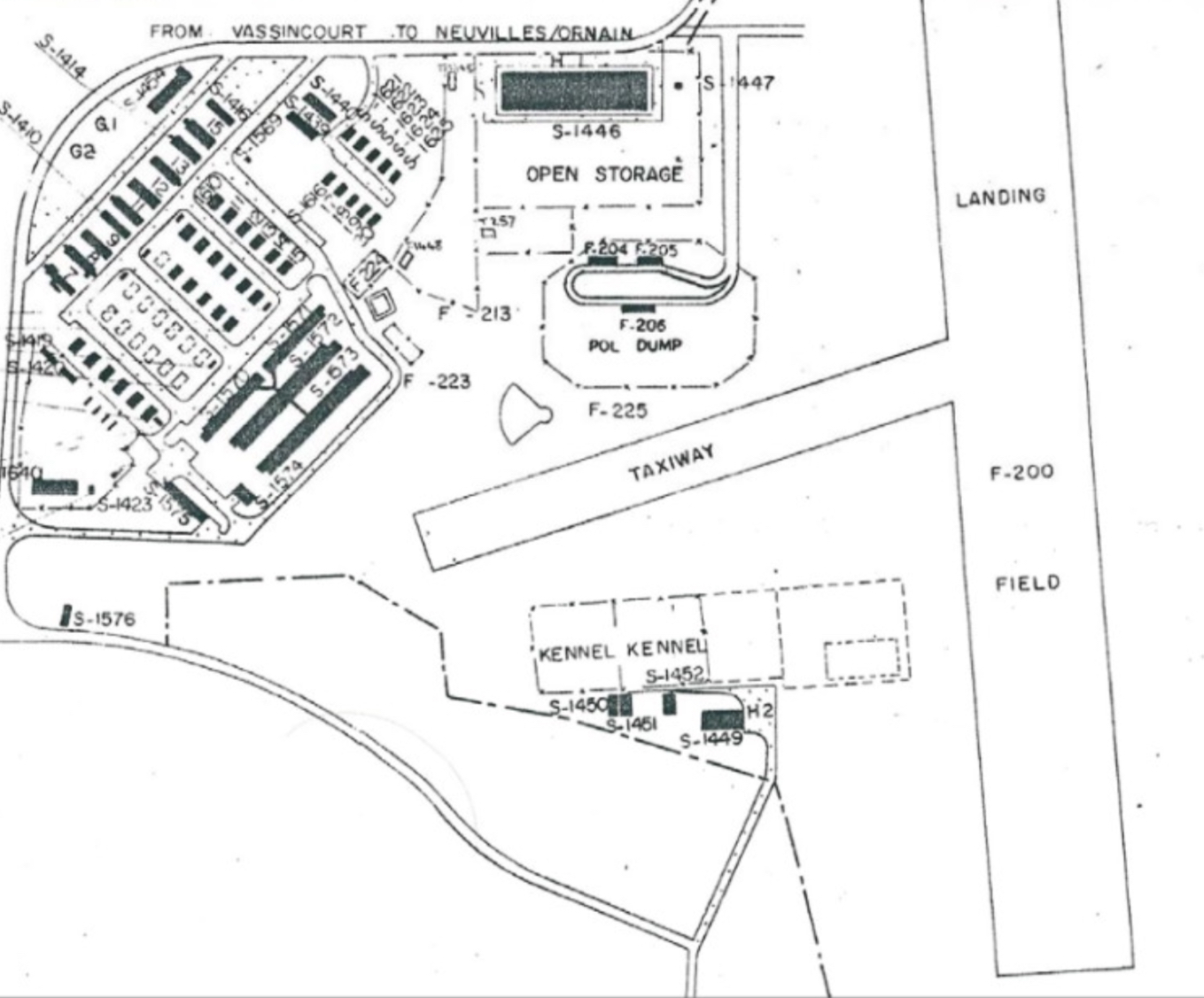
- Vassincourt Airfield during US occupation

Site information
- Type: Military airfield
- Operator: Royal Air Force; Luftwaffe; French Air Force; US Army

Location
- Coordinates: 48°48′30″N 5°02′30″E

Site history
- Built: 1931
- In use: 1931 - 1952

Airfield information
Runways
Direction	Length and surface
N/S	1,465 metres (4,806 ft) Grass

Vassincourt Airfield (also known as Bar-le-Duc) is a former landing ground in the commune of Vassincourt, North-eastern France. It was established in 1931 as a civilian airfield, and was used by the French Army by 1939. During World War II, the airfield was used by the Royal Air Force and French Air Force before capture by German forces for usage by the Luftwaffe in 1943. After the war, it operated as a medical depot by the United States Army, and became a center for handicapped children following military withdrawal in 1967.

== History ==
At the end of World War I, the French government launched a plan (known as the Saconney Plan) for organizing flight routes, and the construction of civil and military airfields until 1933. On June 22, 1931, the Air Club of Barrois was formed for the purpose of developing aviation, especially engineless aircraft. It was set up at Vassincourt Airfield, which later caught the attention of the French Army in 1935. At the beginning of October 1939, a Potez 631 from Training Section 408 arrived from the Marignane base.

=== World War II ===
On October 9, 1939, the airfield was occupied by the No. 1 Squadron RAF, equipped with Hawker Hurricanes belonging to the No. 67 Squadron RAF. On 2 March 1940, a Hawker Hurricane operated by No. 1 Squadron crashed shortly after departing Vassincourt, killing the pilot. On May 10, 1940, the wing permanently left, and the Aerial Reconnaissance Group II/22 moved in. On May 14, the Aerial Observation Group 2/520 was withdrawn from Challerange (Ardennes), and moved to Vassincourt with its three Potez 63/11s and three Mureaux 115s. One Potez was shot down on the 24th, and the group was withdrawn on May 28.

=== German Occupation ===
In 1943, Vassincourt Airfield was taken over by the Luftwaffe's paratrooper Fallschirmjäger-Ausb Regiment. During the German occupation, the airfield was used to grow food, rendering the runway unserviceable for aircraft. In June 1944, the airfield was listed as being serviceable, however no operational units were present.

After the Liberation of France, in 1945, Vassincourt Airfield was revived under the name of Meuse Air Club, and a hangar was constructed. In 1948, the air club was evicted, and dissolved in 1963 as the airfield was requisitioned for use as an American medical warehouse.

== Post War ==
On September 27, 1951, the old airfield was placed at the disposal of the United States Army for the establishment of a medical depot and a hospital, as it was located on military land. The 97th Engineer Battalion moved in to construct the medical depot, and also a barracks. The airfield was permanently closed under the Decree of May 14, 1952. When the US Army left France in 1967, the facilities were purchased by a partnership and planned to transform the buildings into a center for handicapped children.

== Layout ==
The airfield was operated by a 990 x 1465 meters grass runway, and had several hangars.

== Units ==
The following units that were based at Vassincourt Airfield:

- No. 1 Squadron RAF, between 9 October 1939 and 11 April 1940 then 19 April 1940 and 10 May 1940, equipped with Hawker Hurricane I
- Aerial Reconnaissance Group II/22, between 10 May 1940 and 14 June 1940, equipped with eight Potez 63/11s
- Aerial Observation Group 2/520 between 14 May 1940 and 28 May 1940, equipped with three Potez 63/11s
