= Mark Henry Brown =

Canadian World War II flying ace

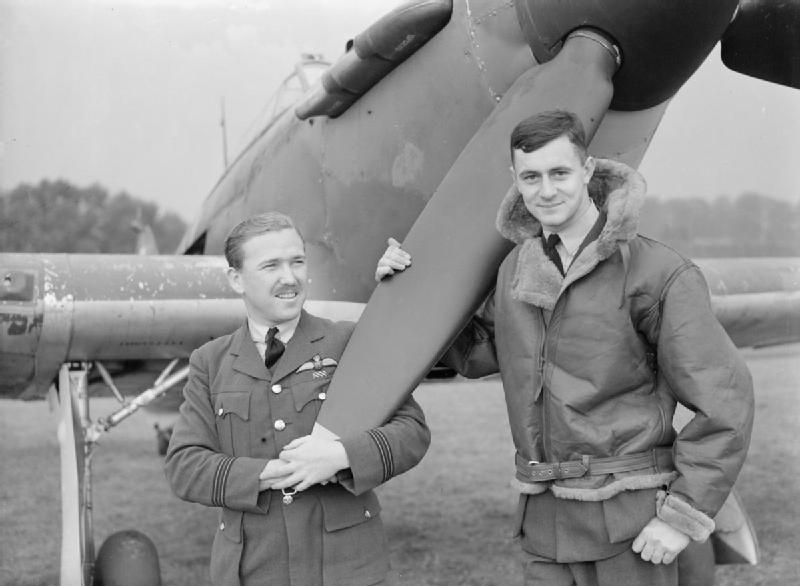
- Brown, on the left, and Pilot Officer Chetham of No. 1 Squadron standing by the nose of a Hawker Hurricane fighter at Wittering, England
- Born: 9 October 1911; Portage la Prairie, Manitoba, Canada
- Died: 12 November 1941 (aged 30) over Sicily, Fascist Italy
- Burial place: Catania War Cemetery, Sicily
- Military career
- Allegiance: United Kingdom
- Branch: Royal Air Force
- Service years: 1936–1941
- Rank: Wing Commander
- Nickname: Hilly
- Service number: 37904
- Commands: No. 1 Squadron
- Conflicts: World War II: Battle of France; Battle of Britain
- Awards: Distinguished Flying Cross & Bar; Czechoslovak War Cross

Wing Commander Mark Henry Brown, DFC & Bar (9 October 1911 – 12 November 1941) was a Canadian-born flying ace who served with the Royal Air Force (RAF) during the Second World War. Credited with having shot down at least fifteen German aircraft, he was the first Canadian pilot to become a flying ace during the war. He was killed in action in November 1941 over Sicily.

== Early life ==
Mark Henry Brown, who was nicknamed 'Hilly', was born on 9 October 1911 in Portage la Prairie in Canada. Following the completion of his schooling, he worked for the Bank of Montreal in Brandon. He learned to fly at the Brandon Flying club and left Canada to join the Royal Air Force in May 1936 on a short service commission. After his training at No. 9 Flying Training School at Thornaby was completed, he was posted to No. 1 Squadron in February 1937 as a pilot officer.

At the time of his posting to No. 1 Squadron, it was based at Tangmere and operating the Hawker Fury biplane fighter. However, in late 1937 it began to replace its aircraft with the new Hawker Hurricane fighter. He was promoted to flying officer in December 1938.

== Second World War ==
At the beginning of September 1939, No. 1 Squadron was deployed to France as part of the Advanced Air Striking Force. By October it was operating from Vassincourt Airfield and patrolling the French-German border, occasionally engaging the Luftwaffe. On 23 November, Brown was credited with a share in the destruction of a Dornier Do 17 medium bomber near Le Cateau. He similarly shared in the shooting down of a Heinkel He 111 medium bomber to the south east of Étain on 3 March 1940. The pace of operations began to pick up the following month and Brown destroyed a Messerschmitt Bf 109 fighter over Thionville on 20 April.

=== Battle of France ===
When the German invasion of France and the Low Countries commenced on 10 May, No. 1 Squadron was heavily engaged and over the following weeks began to retreat, repeatedly shifting from airfield to airfield. Brown shared in the destruction of a Do 17 that day and the next day, shot down a pair of Messerschmitt Bf 110 heavy fighters east of Vervins. On 14 May, Brown shot down a Bf 109 and then a Junkers Ju 87 dive bomber. In doing so, he became the first Canadian pilot to reach flying ace status.

Brown shot down a Bf 110 the next day and on 17 May destroyed another, and also claimed a He 111 as destroyed the same day. He claimed a Henschel Hs 126 reconnaissance aircraft as destroyed on 18 May, to the south east of Saint-Quentin. The following day, he shot down a He 111 and claimed a second of the same type as probably destroyed, both north of Rethel. He destroyed another He 111 on 21 May, also near Rethel. He damaged a Bf 109 on 1 June and then destroyed a Do 17 over Amiens four days later. His final aerial victories in the fighting over France were achieved on 14 June, when he destroyed a He 111 and Bf 109 near Caen. The next day he was shot down but landed safely and made his way to Brest. From there he found passage to Southampton. In the meantime, No. 1 Squadron was withdrawn to the United Kingdom. Brown returned to the squadron, now at Tangmere, on 18 June.

=== Battle of Britain ===
In the weeks after No. 1 Squadron's return to the United Kingdom, it was rested and brought back up to strength, coming operational again in late July. At this time, Brown was awarded the Distinguished Flying Cross (DFC) for "gallantry and devotion to duty in the execution of air operations". He shot down a Bf 110 south of St Catherine's Point on 11 August. He was shot down over Harwich on 15 August but managed to bail out over the English Channel, suffering only minor injuries. He was subsequently picked up by a trawler.

On 3 September 1940 Brown was promoted to flight lieutenant. The following week, No. 1 Squadron went north to Wittering for less intensive patrolling duties as part of No. 12 Group. It was still drawn into the aerial fighting over the southeast of England. Brown claimed a Junkers Ju 88 medium bomber that he intercepted near Kenley on 6 September as damaged and shared in the destruction of a Do 17 east of Cambridge on 24 September.

Following the death of the squadron's commander on 10 November, Brown took over as its commanding officer being promoted to squadron leader. The squadron remained at Wittering until January 1941, at which time it returned south. Operating from Northolt, it was involved in fighter sweeps to France as well as bomber escort missions. It also trained for night flying, and upgraded to Hurricane Mk II fighters. By this time, much of its flying personnel were Czechs and Poles who had escaped to the United Kingdom following the German occupation of their countries.

In April, Brown was posted to serve as an instructor at No. 58 Operational Training Unit (OTU) at Grangemouth where he would remain for two months. During this time, he was awarded a Bar to his DFC, on 23 May, the published citation reading:

This officer has commanded the squadron with outstanding success. He has destroyed a further two enemy aircraft bringing his total victories to at least 18. His splendid leadership and dauntless spirit have been largely instrumental in maintaining a high standard of efficiency throughout the squadron.

— London Gazette, No. 35171, 23 May 1941

In July Brown was promoted to wing commander and transferred to No. 57 OTU at Hawarden, where he was in charge of the training wing.

=== Middle East ===
In October 1941 Brown was posted to the Mediterranean theatre of the war, where he was to lead the fighter wing at Ta Kali, on the island of Malta. On 12 November, flying on his first sortie as wing leader, along with Wing Commander Alexander Rabagliati, he led a strafing attack on the Italian airfield at Gela in Sicily. During the attack, Brown's Hurricane was hit by anti-aircraft fire and his plane crashed at the airfield. A little while later, during a raid on Malta, an Italian aircraft dropped a message that Brown had been buried with full military honours.

Brown is buried in Catania War Cemetery on Sicily. In January 1943, he was posthumously awarded the Czechoslovak Military Cross by the Provisional Government of that country "in recognition of valuable services rendered in connection with the war".

Military aviation historians Christopher Shores and Clive Williams note that many of Brown's claims in the Battle of France were reconstructed after the evacuation of No. 1 Squadron from that country, during which many of its records were lost. Some of the aerial victories achieved there may not have been verified or are in fact considered as probables. Shores and Williams credit Brown with shooting down fifteen German aircraft, and shared in the destruction of four more. He also claimed one as probably destroyed and two damaged. Another military aviation historian, Mike Spick, recites identical aerial victories for Brown.
