= Douglas Cameron (RAF officer) =

British flying ace

- Born: Douglas Euan Cameron; 18 January 1893; Southampton, Hampshire, England
- Died: 10 June 1939 (aged 46); Sussex Downs, Surrey, England
- Military career
- Allegiance: United Kingdom
- Branch: British Army; Royal Air Force
- Service years: 1918–1919
- Rank: Second lieutenant
- Unit: No. 1 Squadron RAF

Second Lieutenant Douglas Euan Cameron (18 January 1893 – 10 June 1939) was a World War I flying ace credited with five victories.

Cameron was appointed a probationary temporary second lieutenant on 10 March 1918, and was confirmed in the rank on 20 May. He joined No. 1 Squadron on 19 June. He scored his first victory on 15 September, over a Pfalz D.XII fighter, and the rest of his wins over Fokker D.VII fighters, with his final two coming on 28 October 1918. He shared credit for four of his five triumphs; among the other pilots aiding him were fellow aces Charles Lavers and William Ernest Staton.

He was transferred to the Unemployed List on 11 January 1919, and received a mention in despatches for his "valuable services rendered during the war" in May. Cameron became a psychologist. He died by suicide, via carbon monoxide poisoning in his vehicle, in 1939.
