= Charles Lavers =

British World War I flying ace

Charles Stewart Touzeau Lavers
- Born: 17 August 1896; Saint Albans, United Kingdom
- Died: 1979
- Military career
- Allegiance: United Kingdom
- Branch: Air Force
- Rank: Captain
- Units: No. 23 Squadron RFC; No. 1 Squadron RAF
- Conflicts: World War I
- Awards: Distinguished Flying Cross; British Empire Medal

Captain Charles Stewart Touzeau Lavers BEM (17 August 1896 – 1979) was a British World War I flying ace credited with nine aerial victories.

== Early life ==
Charles Stewart Touzeau Lavers was born in Saint Albans, England, on 17 August 1896.

== World War I service ==
=== First tour ===
Lavers originally served domestically in the West Yorkshire Regiment from September 1915 through May 1916. He then shipped out to France, serving in the 1st Battalion until September, when he transferred to the Royal Flying Corps. He was assigned to No. 23 Squadron as an observer/gunner on Royal Aircraft Factory FE.2s. He survived a head wound inflicted in November 1916 to become a pilot. When his squadron transitioned to SPADs, Lavers was returned to England for pilot's training.

On 15 November 1916, he was commissioned a second lieutenant, with his seniority backdated to 16 September 1916. On 1 June 1917, he was posted to No. 1 Squadron RFC. There he scored his first victory on 18 June 1917 flying a Nieuport fighter, working with fellow aces Louis Fleeming Jenkin and Harry Reeves to destroy an Albatros D.V over Oostaverne. Lavers went on to tally a string of four "out of control" wins, with the last one on 17 August being shared with William Rooper.

=== Second tour ===
Lavers then converted to Royal Aircraft Factory SE.5as and went back to England to serve in NO. 44 Home Defence Squadron in early 1918. He was promoted to captain on 1 February 1918. He returned to No. 1 Squadron and began scoring again. On 1 June 1918, he shared in the destruction of a German Pfalz D.III fighter; Percy Jack Clayson, Harold Albert Kullberg, and eight other pilots also received credit. On the 17th, he again shared credit for a triumph, with three other pilots. The 15 September saw Lavers, William Ernest Staton, and four other pilots capture a Pfalz D.XII. Lavers last victory, on 1 October 1918, seems to have been a squadron affair, with twelve other pilots also receiving credit for driving down a Fokker D.VII out of control.

== Postwar ==
Lavers transferred to the Royal Air Force unemployed list on 5 July 1919. He was granted the rank of captain on 5 April 1921.

Upon his return to civilian life, Lavers went into his family's timber business.

Late in life, he was awarded the civilian British Empire Medal for his service in the Royal Observer Corps circa 11 June 1960.

== Honors and awards ==
Distinguished Flying Cross (DFC)

Lieut. (A./Capt.) Charles Stewart Touzeau Lavers. (FRANCE)

On a recent occasion this officer led his scout formation, escorting bombers to an objective thirty-nine miles over the lines; all the bombing machines were brought safely back. This was the twentieth successful escort formation that he led during a period of two and a half months. On several occasions enemy aeroplanes have attacked his formation, but they have invariably been driven off, which reflects the highest credit on his skill and determination. He has several machines to his credit, and has assisted in the destruction of others.
