= Roman Schneider =

- Schneider in WW2 as a Luftwaffe officer
- Born: 9 August 1898; Passau, Kingdom of Bavaria, Germany
- Died: 24 December 1967 (aged 69); Munich, Germany
- Military career
- Allegiance: Germany
- Branch: Aviation
- Rank: Lieutenant
- Unit: Jagdstaffel 79
- Awards: Iron Cross

Leutnant Roman Schneider was a German World War I flying ace credited with five aerial victories.

== Biography ==
Roman Schneider was born in Passau, Kingdom of Bavaria on 9 August 1898.

Schneider joined the German military as a cadet corps officer. On 15 July 1916, just shy of his 18th birthday, he began service in the infantry. On 22 August 1917, he began pilot training. Upon completion, he was posted to Jagdstaffel 79 on 9 February 1918. Between 14 May and 5 October 1918, he shot down five enemy airplanes. He was awarded both classes of the Iron Cross. He also acted as acting commander of his squadron on two occasions—May, 1918 and from 15 September to 10 October 1918. He later served as on officer in the Luftwaffe during WW2.
