= Franz Xaver Danhuber =

World War I flying ace

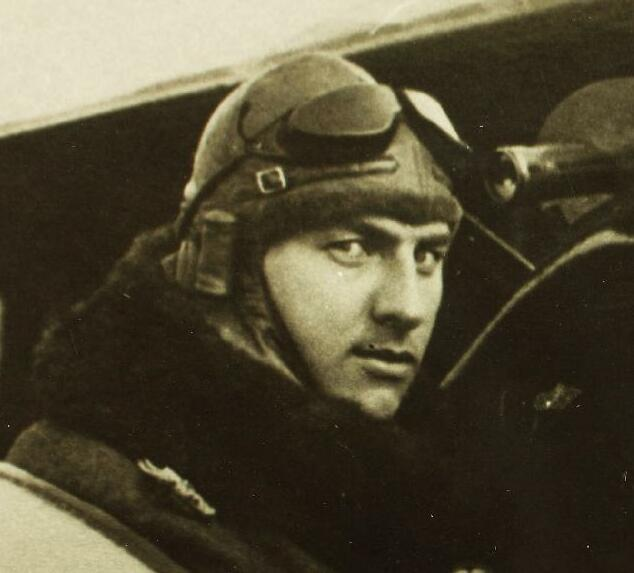
- Born: 27 January 1891; Gars am Inn, Bavaria
- Died: 4 October 1960 (aged 69); Hamburg
- Military career
- Allegiance: German Empire
- Branch: Imperial German Air Service
- Rank: Leutnant
- Units: Kampfgeschwader (Tactical Bomber Wing) 6; Schutzstaffel (Protection Squadron) 25; Jagdstaffel (Fighter Squadron) 26; Jagdstaffel 79
- Commands: Jagdstaffel 79
- Awards: Royal House Order of Hohenzollern

Franz Xaver Danhuber (often wrongly spelled Xavier and Dannhuber; 27 January 1891 – 4 October 1960) was a German World War I flying ace credited with eleven aerial victories.

== War service ==
Danhuber was first assigned to Kampfgeschwader 6 and later to Schutzstaffel 25. His next assignment, which was on 1 July 1917, was to fly a fighter for Jagdstaffel 26. He shot down an observation balloon near Vlamertinghe on 12 August 1917 to start his victory string. Five days later he shot down Canadian ace Harold Joslyn and the same day got a second win. On the 21 August, he won the third time and eventually became an ace on 27 September 1917.

On 1 October 1917, he had another victory in which he killed ace Robert Slolely and eight days later he shot down William Rooper. He scored on each of the two next days, and again on 14 October 1917, to bring his count to ten. On the 18 October Danhuber took a bullet through his upper arm while being shot down, probably by Andre de Meulemeester, which removed Danhuber from action until 7 November on which date he returned to action in a different squadron, Jasta 79. Danhuber ended 1917 by taking command of the jasta in December.

He crashed on 11 February 1918 and was severely wounded. He could resume his command on 9 October 1918 taking over Jagdstaffel 79. Five days later, exactly one year since his last victory, he scored his final triumph by shutting down a new British Sopwith Dolphin.

== Awards ==
- Military Pilot Flying Badge (Bavaria)
- Iron Cross (1914), 2nd and 1st Class
- Knight's Cross of the Royal House Order of Hohenzollern with Swords
- Wound Badge (1918) in Black
- The Honour Cross of the World War 1914/1918 with swords
