= No. 1 Squadron RAF =

Flying squadron of the Royal Air Force

No. 1 (F) Squadron RAF
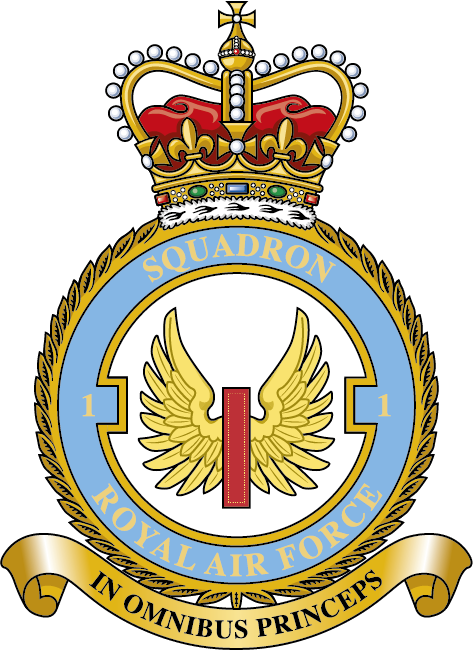
- Squadron badge
- Active: 1911–1912 (RE); 1912–1918 (RFC); 1918–1920; 1920–1926; 1927–1958; 1958–2011; 2012–present
- Country: United Kingdom
- Branch: Royal Air Force
- Type: Flying squadron
- Role: Multi–role combat
- Part of: Combat Air Force
- Station: RAF Lossiemouth
- Mottos: In omnibus princeps (Latin for 'First in all things')
- Aircraft: Eurofighter Typhoon FGR4

Insignia
- Tail badge

- Post-1950 roundel
- Tail codes: NA (Nov 1938 – Sep 1939); JX (Sep 1939 – Apr 1951); FA–FZ (2012–2017)

Number 1 Squadron, also known as No. 1 (Fighter) Squadron, is a squadron of the Royal Air Force. It was the first squadron to fly a VTOL aircraft. It currently operates Eurofighter Typhoon aircraft from RAF Lossiemouth.

The squadron motto, In omnibus princeps ("First in all things") reflects the squadron's status as the RAF's oldest unit, having been involved in almost every major British military operation from the First World War to the present time. These include the Second World War, Suez Crisis, Falklands War, Kosovo War, and Operation Telic (Iraq).

== History ==
=== Early years (1878–1918) ===
No. 1 Squadron's origins go back to 1878 when its predecessor, No. 1 Balloon Company, was formed at the Royal Arsenal, Woolwich as part of the Balloon Section. On 1 April 1911 the Air Battalion of the Royal Engineers was created. The battalion initially consisted of two companies, with No. 1 Company, Air Battalion taking responsibility for lighter than air flying. The first Officer Commanding was Captain E. M. Maitland.

On 13 May 1912, with the establishment of the Royal Flying Corps, No. 1 Company of the Air Battalion was redesignated No. 1 Squadron, Royal Flying Corps. No. 1 Squadron was one of the original three Royal Flying Corps squadrons. Maitland continued as the new squadron's Officer Commanding and he was promoted to major several days after the establishment of the squadron. It retained the airships Beta and Gamma, adding Delta and Eta, as well as kites and a few spherical balloons. However, in October 1913 a sudden decision was made to transfer all the airships to the Naval Wing of the RFC (which became the Royal Naval Air Service by Admiralty diktat, not Cabinet decision, on 1 July 1914). While retaining kites 1 Squadron was reorganised as an 'aircraft park' for the British Expeditionary Force.

On 1 May 1914, Major Charles Longcroft was appointed as the new squadron commander. Apart from a few weeks as a supernumerary in August and September 1914, Longcroft continued as the squadron commander until January 1915.

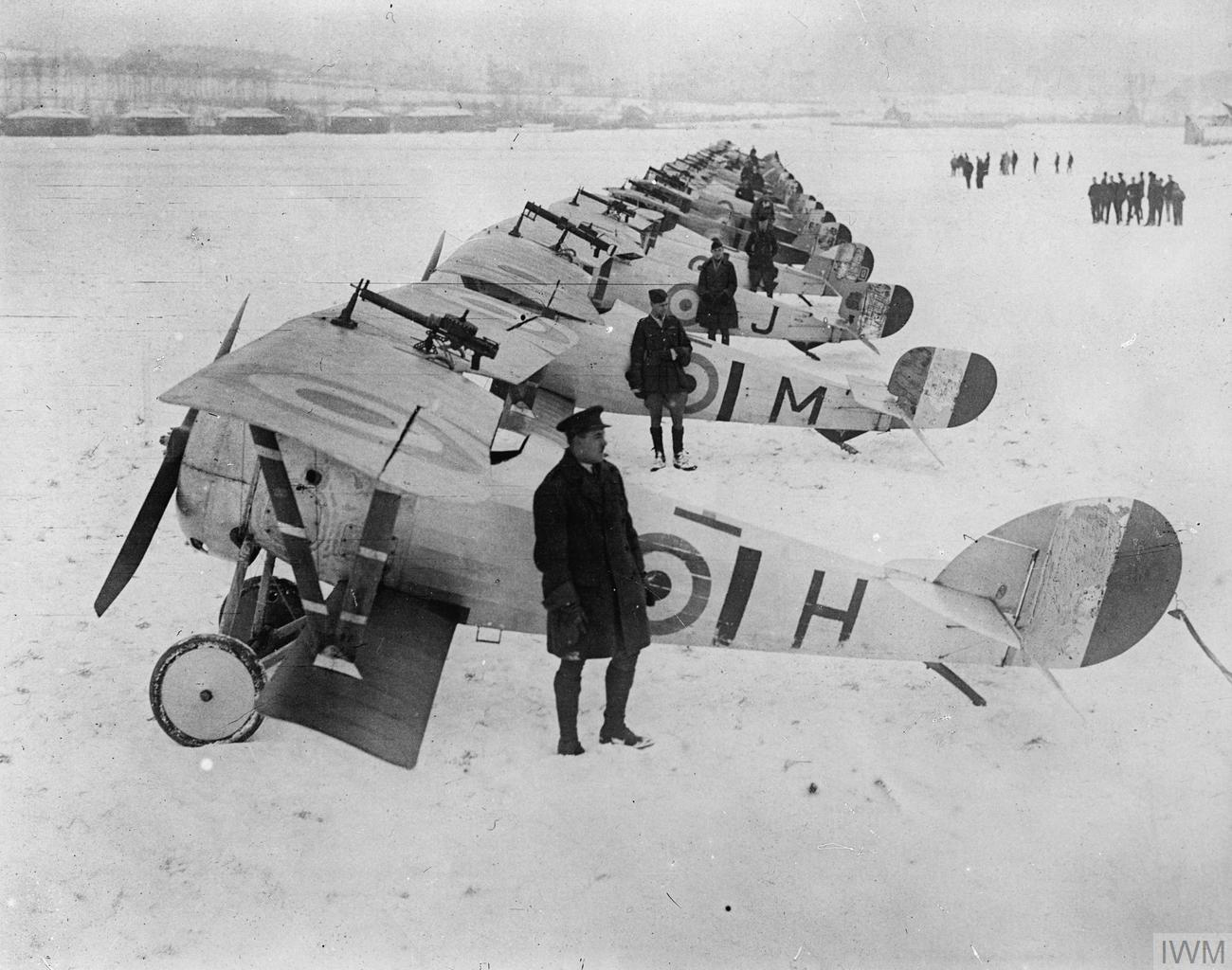
No.1 RAF Squadron with Nieuport 17s and Nieuport 24s at Bailleul on 27 December 1917

The squadron was reformed as an aircraft squadron in August 1914, and equipped with a mixture of Avro 504s and Royal Aircraft Factory B.E.8s, crossed over to France on 7 March 1915, under the command of Major Geoffrey Salmond, later Chief of the Air Staff. It operated mainly in the reconnaissance role, with a few single seat fighters for escort purposes. The squadron was soon thrown into action, taking part in the Battle of Neuve Chapelle in March 1915, and moved to Balleul at the end of the month, remaining there until March 1918, operating from an airfield next to the town's Asylum. In April–May 1915, the squadron flew reconnaissance missions during the Second Battle of Ypres. On 19 August, Salmond was replaced as commander of the squadron by Major Philip Joubert de la Ferté, later an Air Chief Marshal. By October 1915, the squadron had re-equipped with a mixture of various Morane-Saulnier types, with Morane Parasols (Types L and LA) in the Corps Reconnaissance role and Morane-Saulnier N single-seat fighters. The squadron supplemented its Parasols with more modern Morane-Saulnier P parasols and Morane-Saulnier BB biplanes in 1916, although the last LA remained with the squadron until 1917. The squadron became a dedicated fighter squadron on 1 January 1917, flying Nieuport 17s and Nieuport 27.

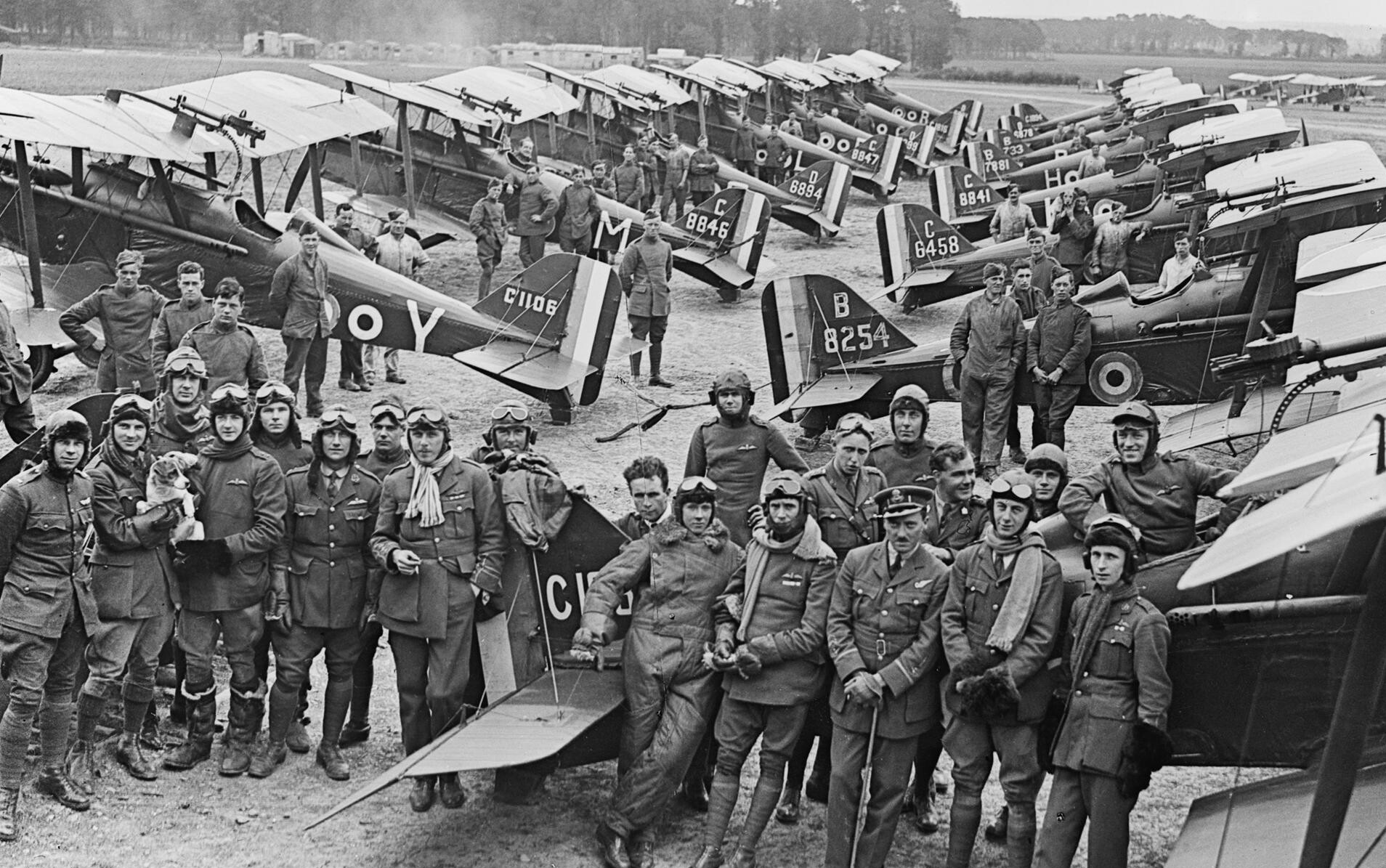
Officers of No. 1 Squadron, RAF with SE5a biplanes at Clairmarais aerodrome, near Ypres, July 1918

The obsolete Nieuports were replaced by more modern S.E.5as in January 1918. On incorporation into the RAF on 1 April 1918 the squadron kept its numeral; No 1 Squadron of the Royal Naval Air Service (RNAS) was displaced to become No. 201 Squadron RAF. (Note: The war diary of No. 1 Squadron held by the Australian War Memorial, starts in January 1918.)

No. 1 Squadron had among its ranks no fewer than 31 flying aces. They include Robert A. Birkbeck, Quintin Brand (later Air Vice Marshal), Douglas Cameron, William Charles Campbell, Percy Jack Clayson, Edwin Cole, Philip Fullard (later Air Commodore), Eustace Grenfell, Louis Fleeming Jenkin, Tom Hazell, Harold Albert Kullberg, Charles Lavers, Francis Magoun, Guy Borthwick Moore, Gordon Olley, Harry Rigby, William Wendell Rogers and William Rooper.

=== Interwar period (1919–1938) ===
The squadron returned to the UK from France in March 1919, being formally disbanded on 20 January 1920. On the next day it reformed at Risalpur in the North West Frontier of India (now part of Pakistan), flying the Sopwith Snipe and from January 1920. It moved to Hinaidi near Baghdad in Iraq in May 1921, to carry out policing duties, retaining its Snipes, although it also received one Bristol Jupiter engined Nieuport Nighthawk for evaluation. It remained in Iraq, carrying out strafing and bombing against hostile tribal forces until November 1926 when it was disbanded. While stationed in Iraq, the squadron suffered 10 fatalities among its officers and ground crew, who are buried at the Ma'Asker Al Raschid RAF Cemetery in Baghdad.

In early 1927 it was reformed at RAF Tangmere, Sussex as a Home Defence Fighter Squadron, equipped with the Armstrong Whitworth Siskin. After receiving the Hawker Fury Mk.1 in February 1932, the squadron gained a reputation for aerobatics, giving displays throughout the United Kingdom and at the Zürich International Air Meeting in July 1937, where its display impressed but it was clear that it was outclassed by the German Messerschmitt Bf 109 and Dornier Do 17 also displayed at Zurich. The squadron re-equipped with the Hawker Hurricane Mk.I in October 1938.

=== Second World War (1939–1945) ===
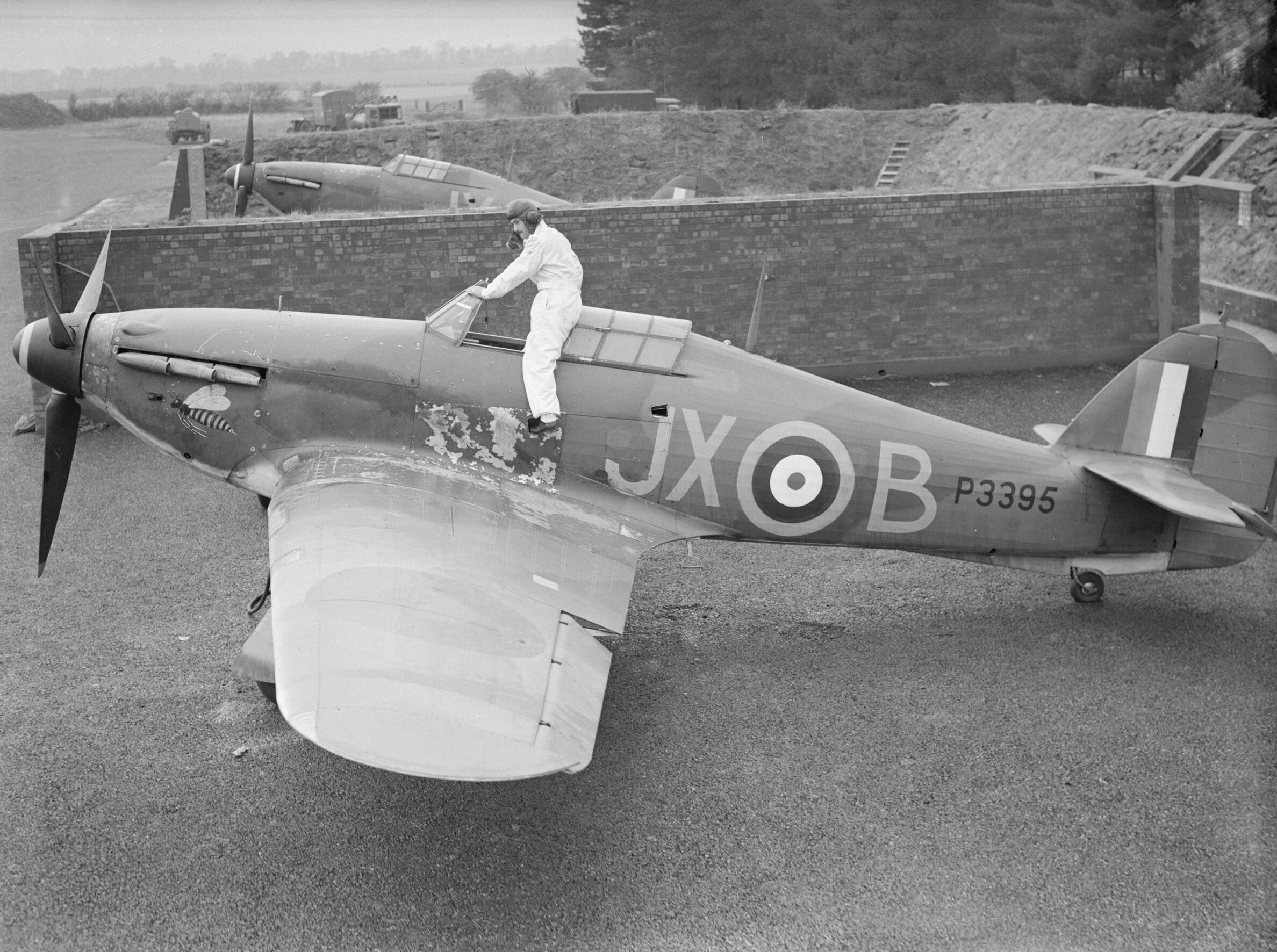
Pilot Officer "Taffy" Clowes climbing into his No. 1 Squadron Hawker Hurricane Mk.I at RAF Wittering, in October 1940

On the outbreak of the Second World War in September 1939 the squadron was deployed to France as part of the RAF Advanced Air Striking Force. In October it flew over enemy territory for the first time and soon claimed its first victory, shooting down a Dornier Do 17 on 31 October. Further successes were made during the Phoney War, until the Battle of France erupted in May 1940. Within a week the squadron was bombed out of its base at Berry-au-Bac, north-west of Paris. A series of retreats followed, ending only when the squadron evacuated from France on 18 June, with a return to Tangmere on 23 June.

In August 1940 the squadron entered the Battle of Britain and was heavily engaged until 9 September, when the squadron was transferred to No. 12 Group and sent to RAF Wittering to refit, rest and recuperate.

It returned to No. 11 Group in early 1941 and was employed in fighter sweeps and bomber escort duties. In February, it began "Rhubarb" (low-level sweeps over occupied territory) and night flying missions, and was re-equipped with the Hurricane IIA. In this period its pilots included Karel Kuttelwascher DFC, who was the RAF's highest-scoring night intruder pilot and highest-scoring Free Czechoslovak pilot.

The squadron carried out night intruder patrols until July 1942, when it was re-equipped with the Hawker Typhoon fighter-bomber and relocated to RAF Acklington, Northumberland where it reverted to daytime operations.

The squadron was equipped with the Supermarine Spitfire Mk.IX in April 1944, and in June began anti-V1 patrols, shooting down 39 flying bombs. Missions were also flown over the Falaise Gap, strafing targets of opportunity. Later in the year it reverted to bomber escort duties, based at Maldegem. It was involved in supporting Operation Market Garden : the parachute drops into the Netherlands, and later in support of the Allied counter-offensive in the Ardennes. The squadron dropped 250 lb bombs on to 'Key Points' (KPs), directed by radar to counter the adverse weather conditions. In May 1945 it converted to the Spitfire Mk.XXI, but these were only used operationally to cover landings on the Channel Islands.

=== Post-war (1946–1968) ===
In 1946, the Squadron returned to Tangmere and took delivery of its first jet aircraft, the Gloster Meteor. In October 1948, Major Robin Olds, USAF, under the U.S. Air Force/Royal Air Force exchange program, was posted in and flying the Gloster Meteor jet fighter. He eventually served as commander of the Squadron at RAF Station Tangmere, an unusual posting for a non-commonwealth foreigner in peacetime.

The Squadron was then equipped with the Hawker Hunter F.5, which were flown from RAF Akrotiri, Cyprus during the 1956 Suez Crisis. The squadron disbanded on 23 June 1958. However, on 1 July 1958 the squadron was reformed by re-numbering No. 263 Squadron at RAF Stradishall. It then moved to RAF Waterbeach from where, flying the Hunter FGA.9, it operated in the ground attack role as part of No. 38 Group. The Squadron continued in this role for the next eight years, operating out of Waterbeach and then RAF West Raynham. Flight Lieutenant Alan Pollock of No. 1 Squadron was responsible for the infamous and very unofficial flying display on the 50th anniversary of the RAF in 1968.

=== Harrier (1969–2011) ===
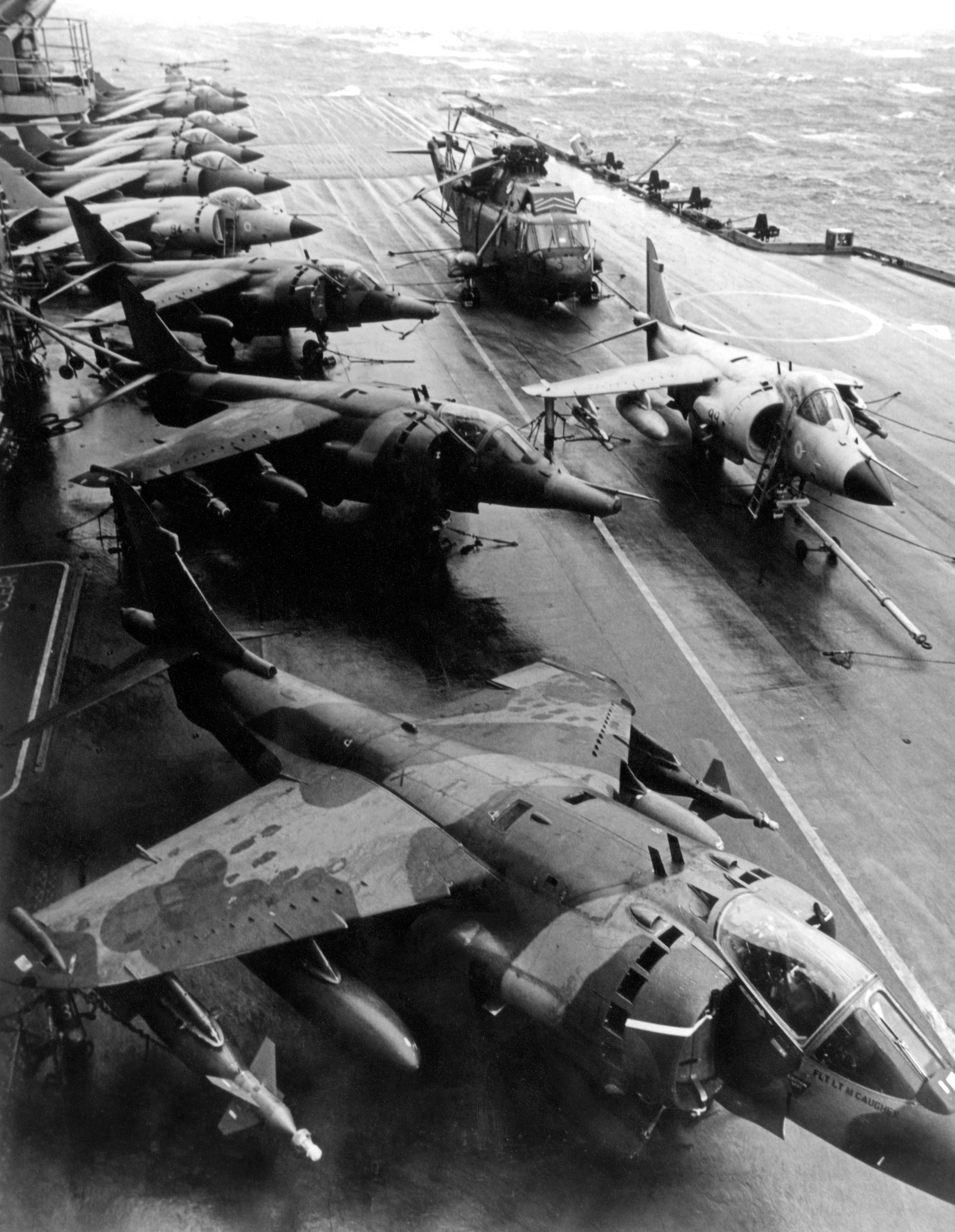
No. 1 Squadron Harriers aboard HMS Hermes during the Falklands War

Under the command of Squadron Leader Bryan Baker, the squadron became the world's first operator of a V/STOL aircraft with the arrival of the Hawker Siddeley Harrier in 1969, and was declared operational the following year. The squadron was assigned to NATO's ACE Mobile Force, a rapid reaction force tasked with reinforcing NATO's flanks, which resulted in frequent deployments to Norway. In November 1975, as a result of threats of Guatemala invading Belize, a detachment of six Harriers from the Squadron were sent to Belize, with the deployment (Operation Nucha) continuing until Easter 1976. In July 1977, renewed tensions with Guatemala saw another detachment to Belize. This continued into June 1978, after which the responsibility for air defence of Belize was rotated between the all three Harrier-equipped squadrons.

In April 1982, following Argentina's invasion of the Falkland Islands, the squadron was ordered to reinforce the British Task Force sailing to retake the islands, to act as potential attrition replacements for the Fleet Air Arm's limited number of Sea Harriers. The squadron's Harriers were quickly modified to make the aircraft more compatible with operations from aircraft carriers, and to add the ability to use the Sidewinder air-to-air missile. Six Harriers were carried to the South Atlantic aboard the container ship Atlantic Conveyor, flying to the carrier HMS Hermes between 18 and 20 May, and flying their first operational mission on 19 May. Two additional Harriers were flown to Hermes on 1 June, and another two arrived on 8 June. Others remained on Ascension Island to provide air defence for this vital base.

Losses of Sea Harriers were less than feared, and as a result, the squadron's Harriers concentrated on ground attack duties. From 1 June, a forward airstrip at Port San Carlos became available, which allowed Harriers and Sea Harriers to refuel, thus avoiding having to return to the carriers if they had not expended their weapons. By the end of the fighting the squadron's Harriers were being used to drop Laser guided bombs, with a ground-based FAC illuminating the targets. The squadron flew 150 sorties from Hermes and Port San Carlos during the war, of which 126 were operational missions over the Falklands. Four Harriers were lost during the conflict, with a fifth one sustaining sufficient damage from a fire that it saw no further service during the war, and was returned to Britain by ship. Following the end of the war, a detachment of the squadron's Harriers was based at Port Stanley Airport to maintain air defence of the Falklands in case of further attacks from Argentina. Responsibility for the detachment was passed to 4 Squadron in November 1982, with the detachment becoming 1453 Flight in August 1983.

Harrier II

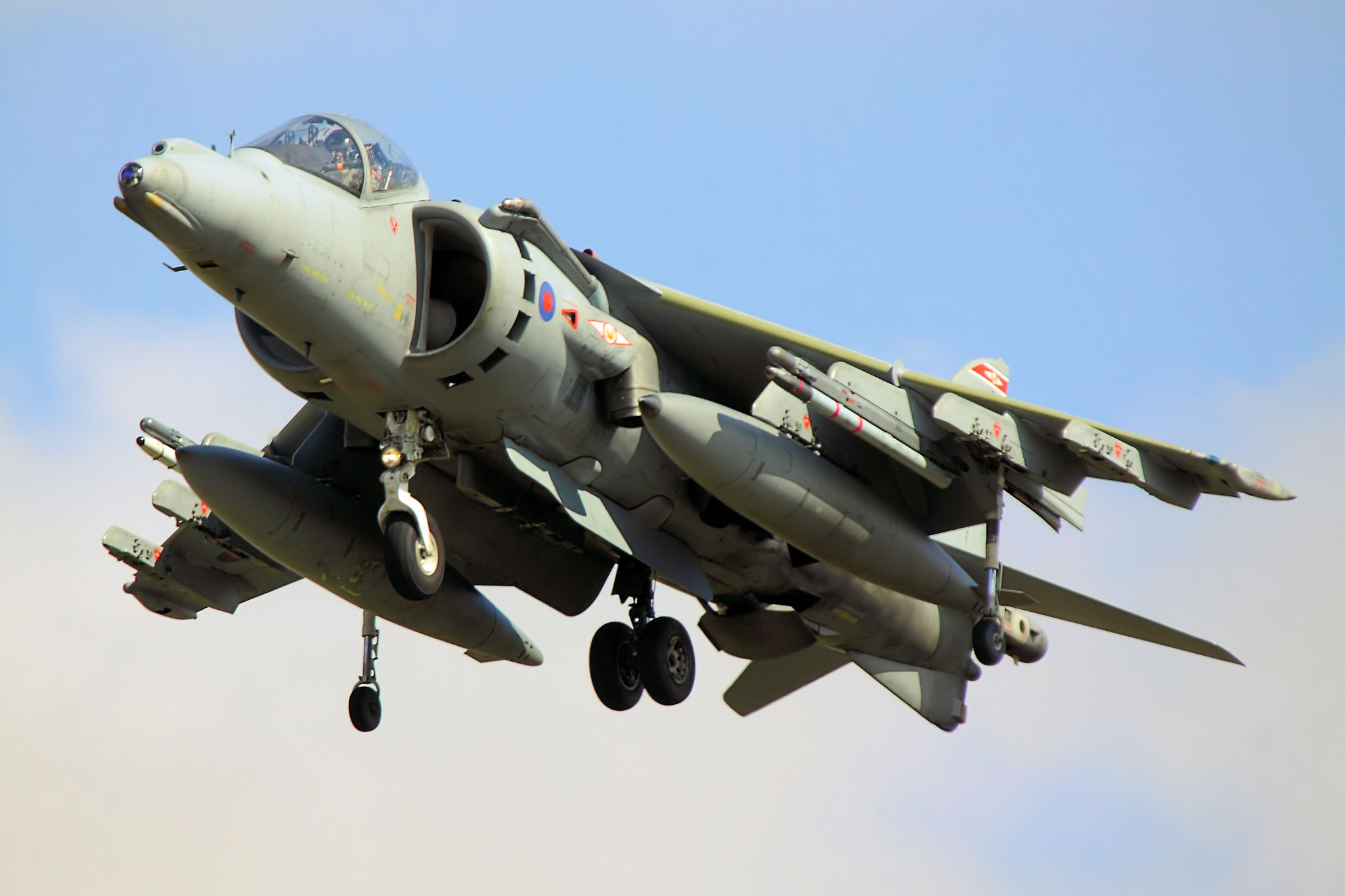
A Harrier in No. 1 (F) Squadron markings at RAF Cottesmore

The squadron replaced its first generation Harriers with Harrier IIs from 23 November 1988, being declared fully operational on the Harrier GR.5 on 2 November 1989. The squadron was the subject of an episode of the BBC documentary series Defence of the Realm before and during its participation in the Bosnian War as part of NATO's Operation Deny Flight. During the Kosovo war the Squadron flew sorties as part of NATO's Operation Allied Force.

No. 1 Squadron left the "home of the Harrier" at RAF Wittering for RAF Cottesmore on 28 July 2000. Cottesmore became home to all operational RAF Harrier squadrons – No. 20 (Reserve) Squadron, later renumbered as No. 4 (R) Squadron, the Harrier Operational Conversion Unit remained at Wittering. The squadrons both flew missions during the Iraq War and were awarded the "Iraq 2003" battle honour.

The squadron was awarded a battle honour in March 2020, recognising its role in the War in Afghanistan.

One outcome of the Strategic Defence and Security Review by the coalition government in 2010 was the decision to take the RAF's Harriers out of service almost immediately. All Harrier units, including No. 1 (F) Squadron, ceased Harrier flying on 15 December 2010, with No. 1 (F) Squadron formally disbanding on 28 January 2011.

=== Typhoon (2012–present) ===
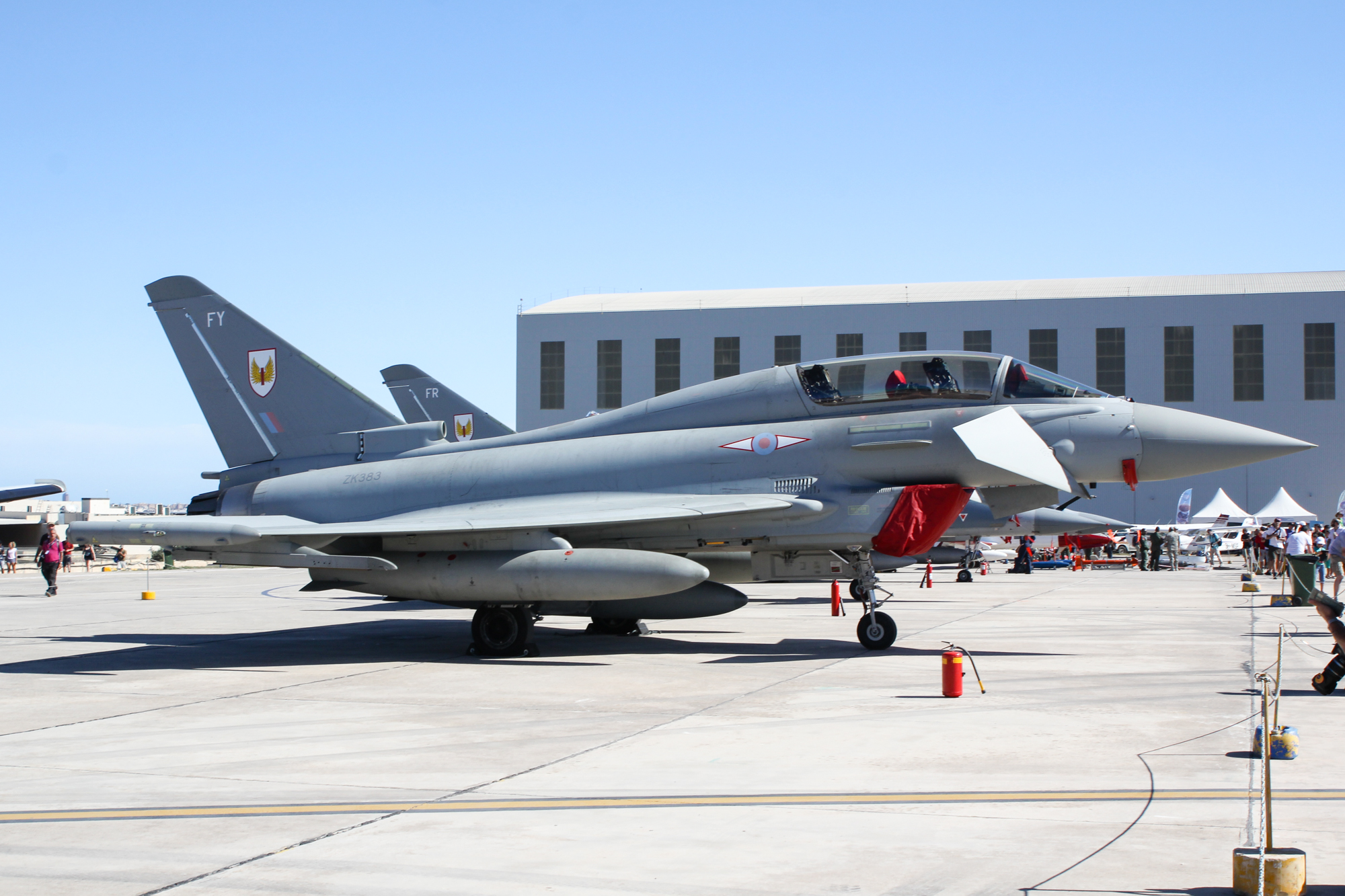
No. 1 (F) Squadron Eurofighter Typhoon T3 at the 2015 Malta International Airshow

On 15 September 2012, the squadron reformed on the Eurofighter Typhoon at RAF Leuchars. The squadron participated in multiple exercises in foreign countries including Exercise Shaheen Star in the United Arab Emirates during January 2013 and Exercise Bersama Shield in Malaysia during March 2013.

On 8 September 2014, No. 1 (F) Squadron relocated to RAF Lossiemouth, to operate alongside No. 6 and XV (R) squadrons, as well as "D" Flight, No. 202 Squadron (SAR) and No. 5 Force Protection Wing.

On 14 November 2019 the squadron deployed 4 fighters to Keflavik Air Base as part of the NATO Air Policing, Iceland. The squadron also deployed an additional 100 personnel to support the squadron and forces based in Iceland.

== Aircraft operated ==
- Avro 504 (1915–1916)
- B.E.8 (1915–1916)
- Morane Parasol (1915–1916)
- Nieuport 17 (1916–1917)
- Nieuport 27 (1917–1918)
- SE5a (1918–1920)
- Sopwith Snipe (1920–1927)
- Armstrong Whitworth Siskin (1927–1933)
- Hawker Fury (1933–1937)
- Hawker Hurricane (1937–1943)
- Hawker Typhoon (1943–1944)
- Supermarine Spitfire (1944–1950)
- Gloster Meteor F.8 (1950–1957)
- Hawker Hunter F.5/F.6/FGA.9/T.7 (1957–1970)
- Hawker Siddeley Harrier GR.1 and GR.3 (1969–1989)
- British Aerospace Harrier GR5, GR7 and GR9 (1988–2010)
- Eurofighter Typhoon FGR4 (2012 – present)
A selection of aircraft previously operated by No. 1 Squadron
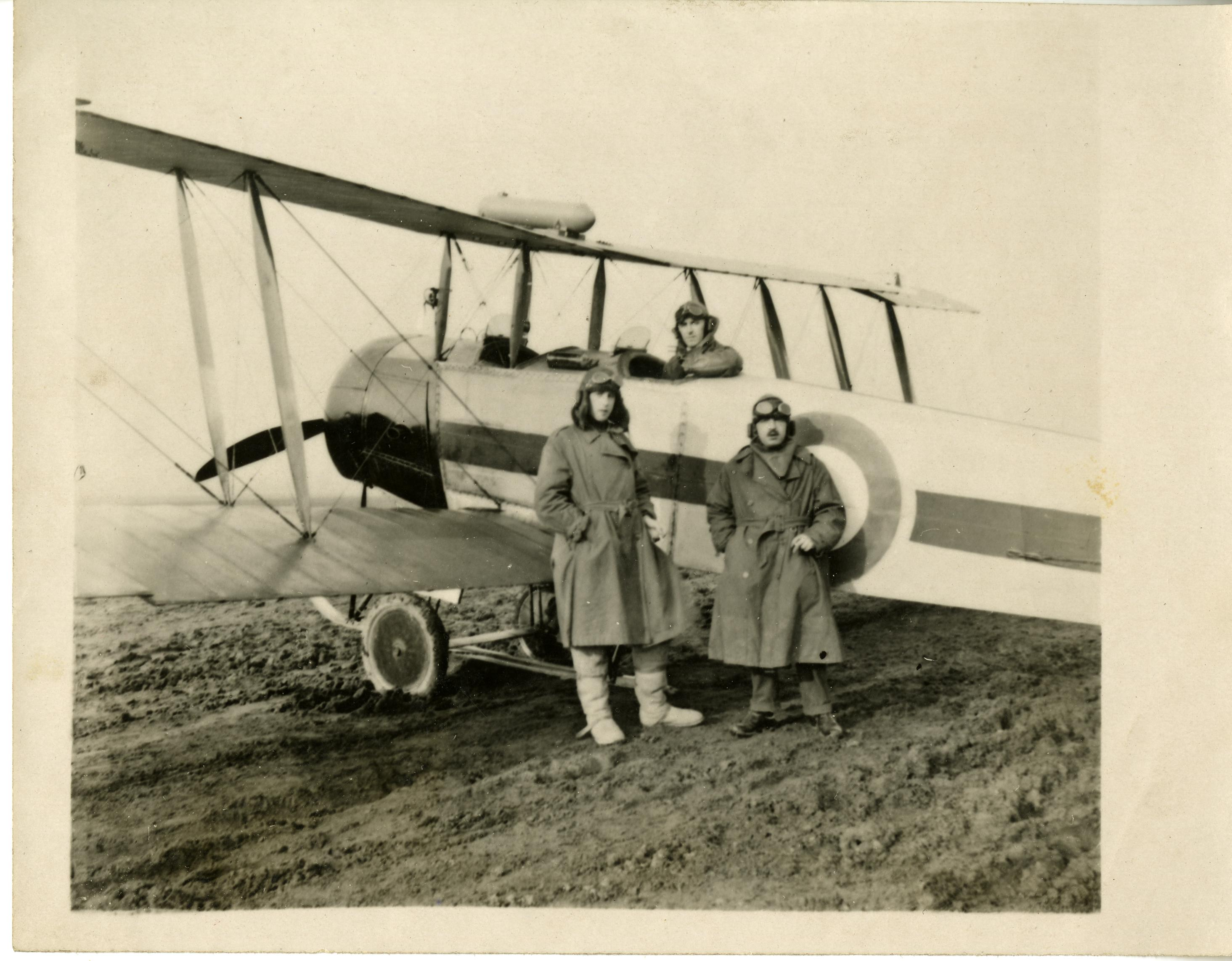
Men of the Royal Flying Corps beside an Avro 504.

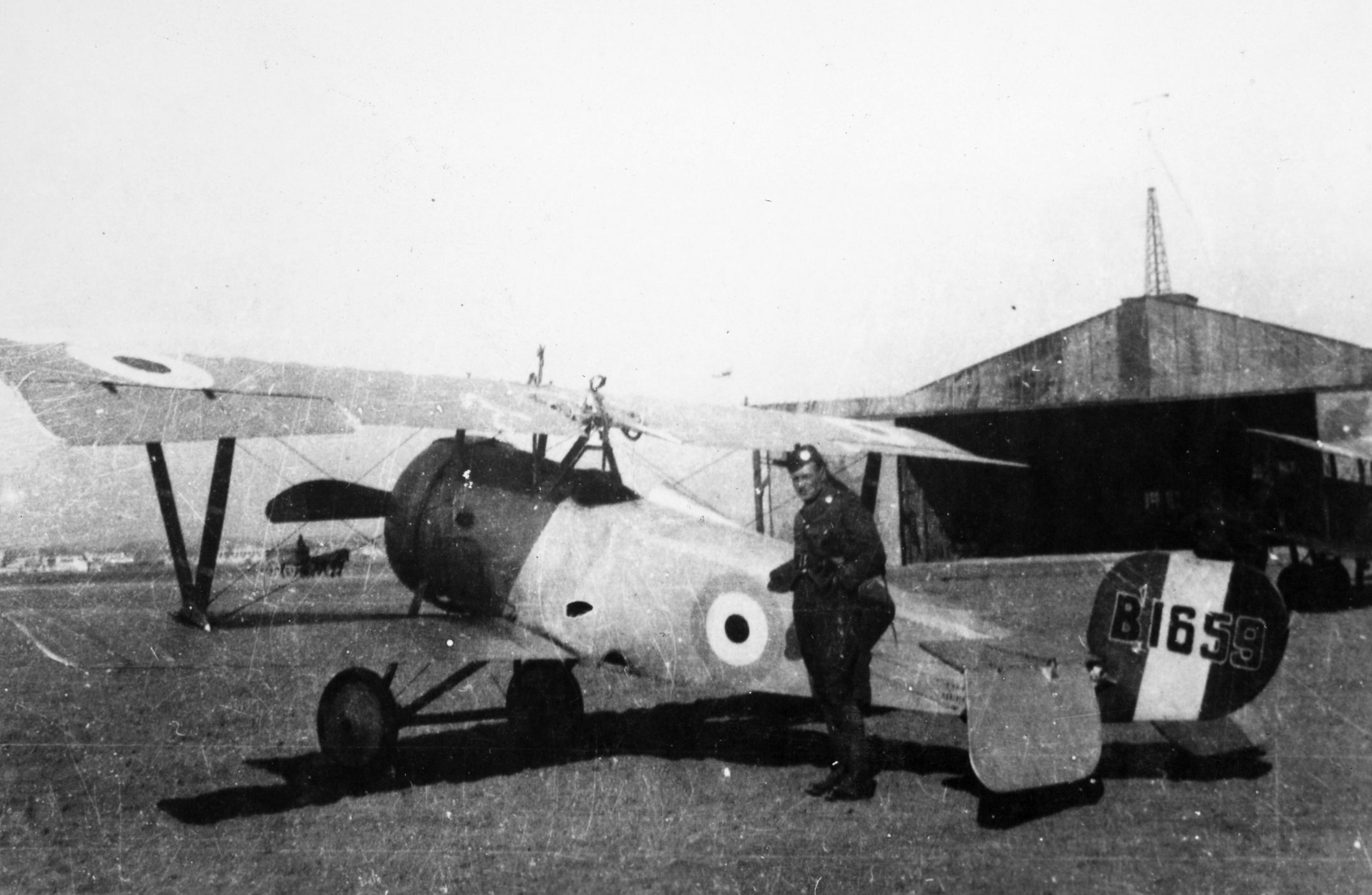
A Royal Flying Corps Nieuport 23 in 1917.

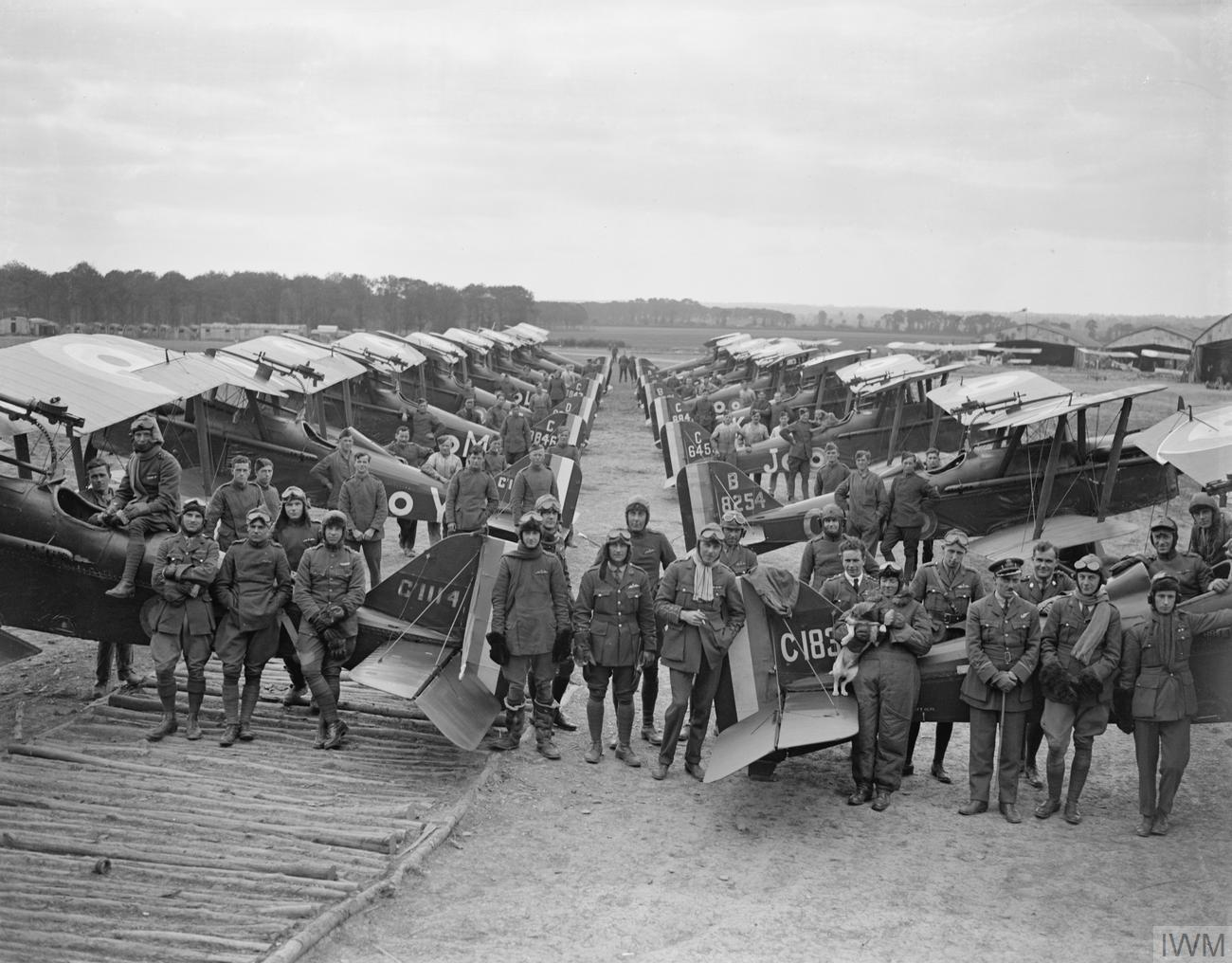
S.E.5a fighters and pilots of No. 1 Squadron at Clairmarais aerodrome, July 1918.

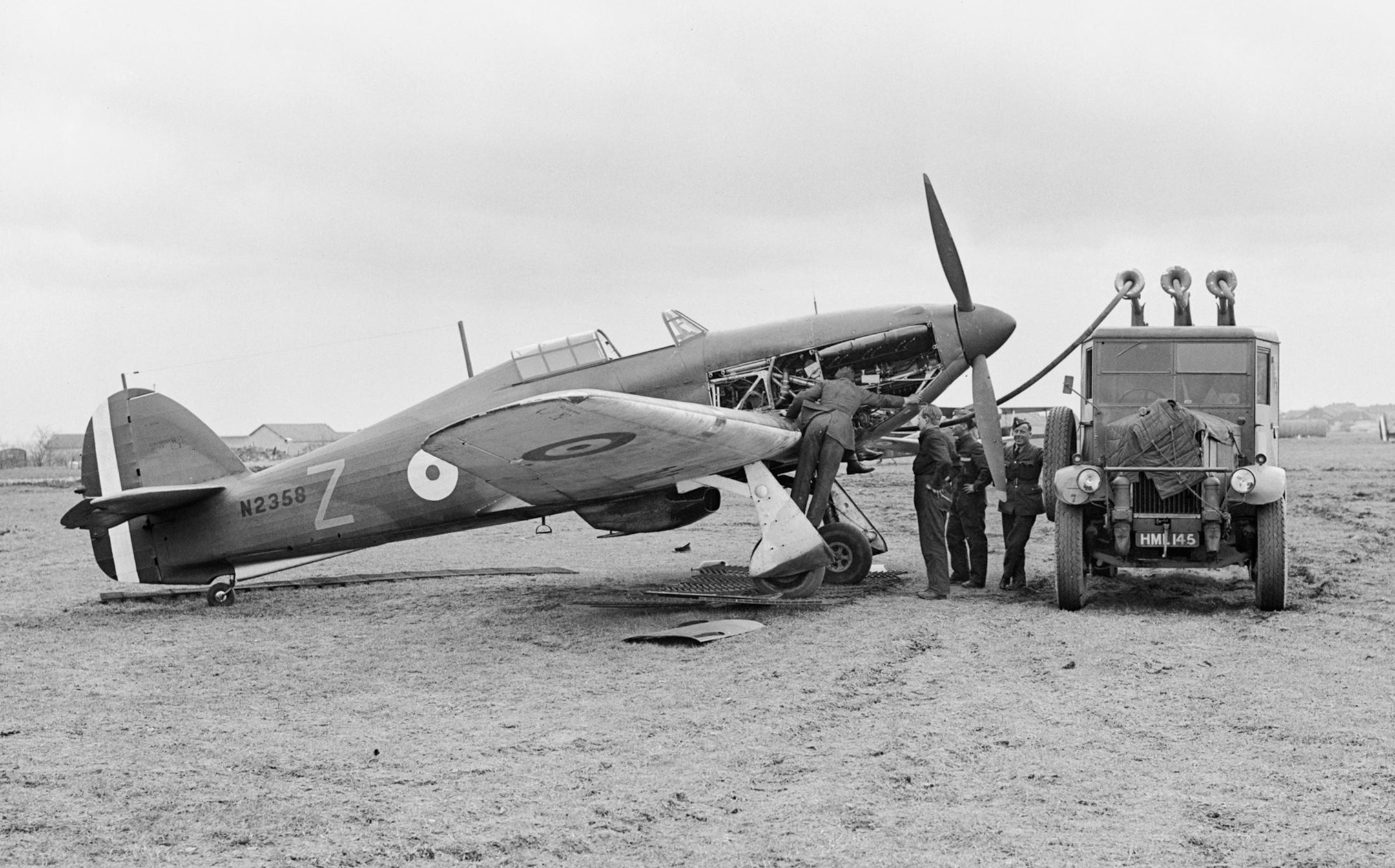
Hawker Hurricane Mk I, N2358 Z, of No. 1 Squadron is refuelled while undergoing an engine check at Vassincourt, France, during 1940.

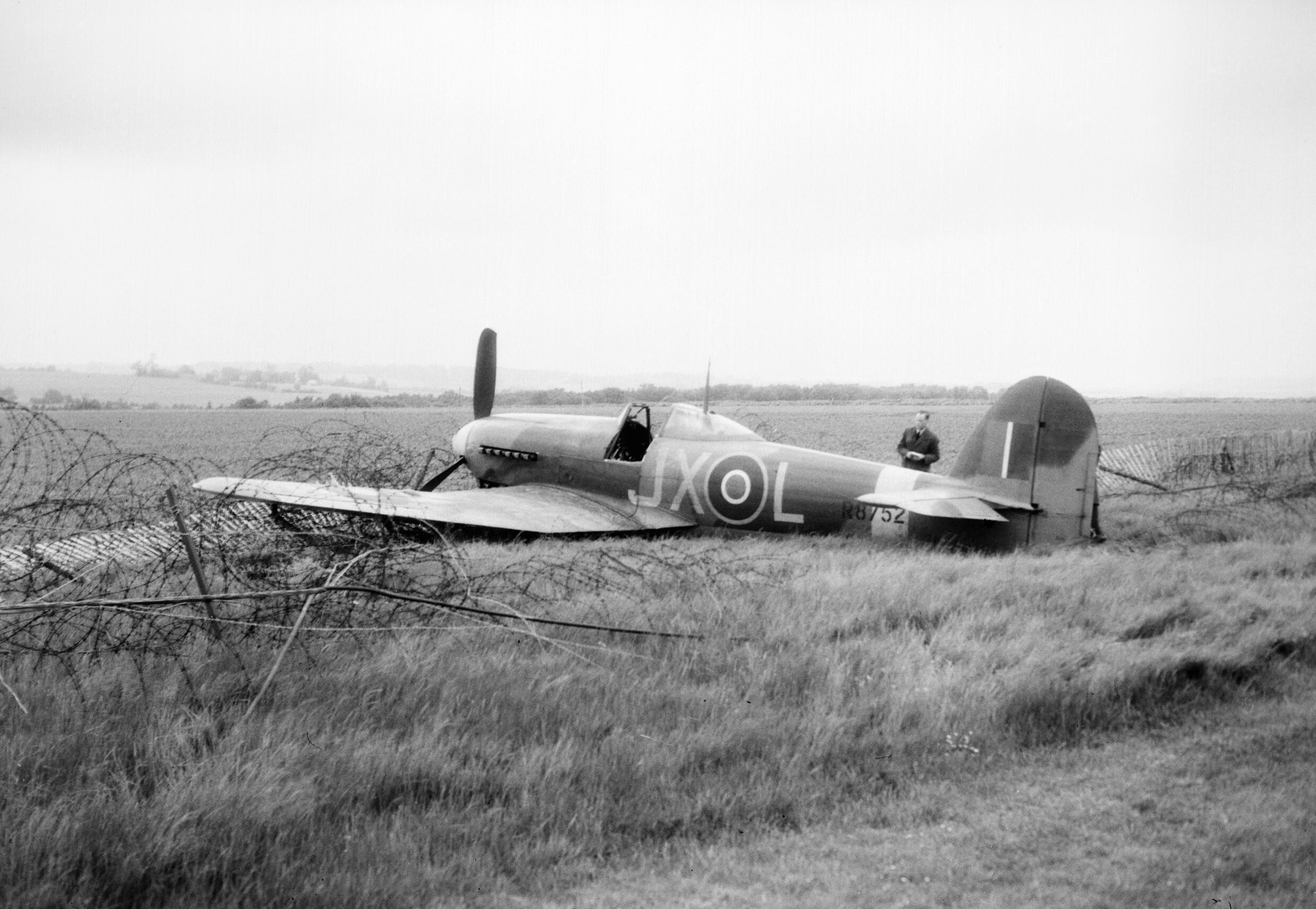
Hawker Typhoon IB R8752 of No. 1 Squadron, written-off after crash-landing in a field near its base at Lympne on 2 June 1943.

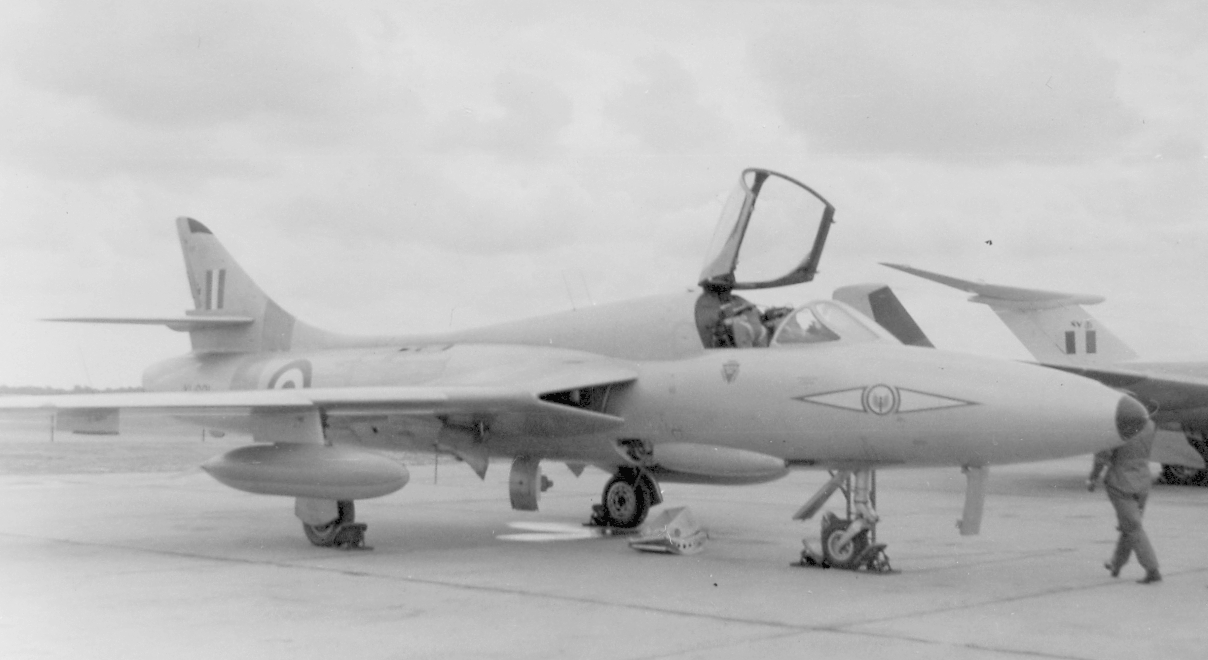
A Hawker Hunter T7 in No. 1 Squadron markings during the late 1950s.

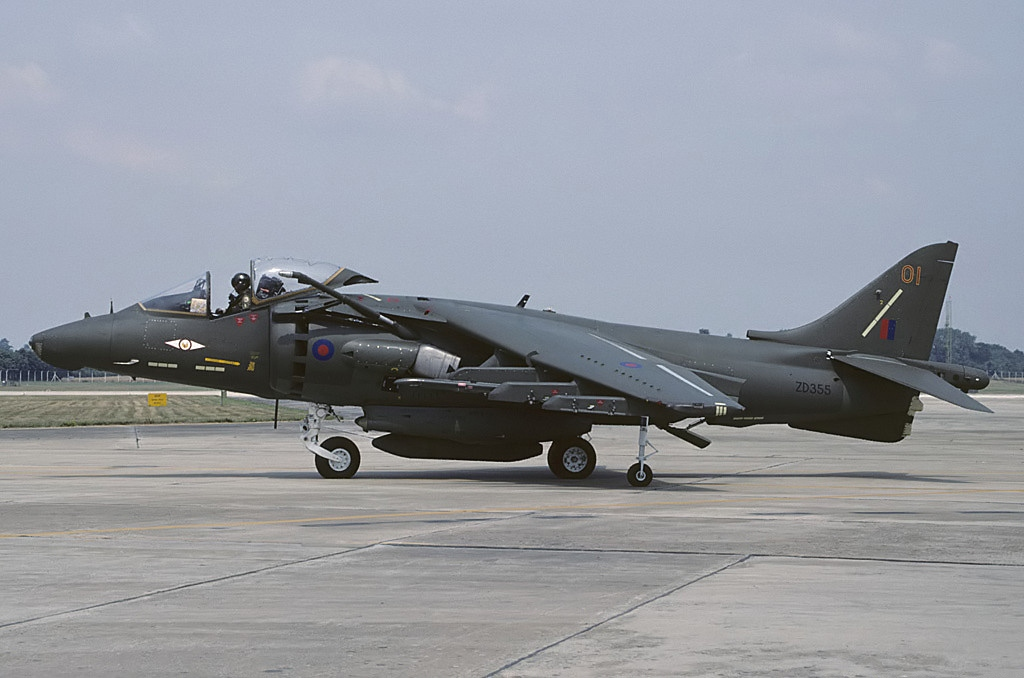
British Aerospace Harrier GR5 ZD355 '01' of No. 1 Squadron seen at Royal International Air Tattoo in 1989.

== Heritage ==
=== Badge and motto ===
No.1 Squadron's badge features a winged numeral "1" and was approved by King Edward VIII in July 1936. It is the authorised version of an earlier badge used during the First World War which had a "1" on the national roundel marking with a laurel wreath and two Royal Flying Corps wing.

The squadron's motto is In omnibus princeps (Latin for 'First in all things').

=== Call signs ===
As of March 2025, aircraft operated by No. 1 Squadron use the following peacetime air traffic control call signs within UK airspace: Jedi, Psycho, Stampede, Tribal, Vega, and Winston.

== Battle honours ==
No. 1 Squadron has received the following battle honours. Those marked with an asterisk (*) may be emblazoned on the squadron standard.

- Western Front (1915–1918)*
- Ypres (1915)*
- Neuve Chapelle (1915)
- Loos (1915)
- Somme (1916)
- Arras (1917)
- Ypres (1917)
- Lys (1918)
- Amiens (1918)
- Somme (1918)
- Hindenburg Line (1916–1917)
- Independent Force and Germany (1918)*
- Kurdistan (1922–1925)
- Iraq (1923–1925)
- France and Low Countries (1939–1940)*
- Battle of Britain (1940)*
- Channel and North Sea (1941–1945)
- Home Defence (1940–1945)
- Fortress Europe (1941–1944)*
- Arnhem (1944)*
- Normandy (1944)
- France and Germany (1944–1945)*
- Biscay (1944–1945)
- Rhine (1945)
- South Atlantic (1982)*
- Kosovo (1999)*
- Iraq (2003)*
- Afghanistan (2001–2014)

== Commanding officers ==
List of commanding officers of No. 1 Squadron, including date of appointment, sourced from Halley, Shaw and Franks & O'Connor.

- Major E M Maitland (13 May 1912)
- Major C A H Longcroft (1 May 1914)
- Major W G H Salmond (28 January 1915)
- Major P B Joubert de la Ferté (19 August 1915)
- Major G F Pretyman (24 November 1915)
- Major G C St P de Dombasle (24 December 1916)
- Major A Barton-Adams (20 June 1917)
- Major W E Young (3 August 1918)
- Squadron Leader J O Andrews (21 January 1920)
- Squadron Leader J B Graham (18 September 1920)
- Squadron Leader G G A Williams (10 November 1922)
- Squadron Leader E O Grenfell (8 October 1923)
- Squadron Leader E D Atkinson (25 May 1924)
- Squadron Leader C.N. Lowe (19 April 1926)
- Squadron Leader E D Atkinson (11 April 1927)
- Squadron Leader E O Grenfell (19 March 1928)
- Squadron Leader C B S Spackman (27 July 1931)
- Squadron Leader R W Chappell (21 November 1933)
- Squadron Leader C W Hill (1 October 1934)
- Flight Lieutenant T N McEvoy (acting) (31 January 1936)
- Squadron Leader C W Hill (1 December 1936)
- Squadron Leader F R D Swain (12 April 1937)
- Squadron Leader I A Bertram (15 January 1938)
- Squadron Leader P J H Halahan (17 April 1939)
- Squadron Leader D A Pemberton (24 May 1940)
- Squadron Leader M H Brown (10 November 1940)
- Squadron Leader R E P Brooker (23 April 1941)
- Squadron Leader J A F MacLachlan (3 November 1941)
- Squadron Leader R C Wilkinson (31 July 1942)
- Squadron Leader A Zweigbergh (30 May 1943)
- Squadron Leader J Checketts (3 April 1944)
- Squadron Leader H P Lardner-Burke (29 April 1944)
- Squadron Leader D G S R Cox (11 January 1945)
- Squadron Leader R S Nash (21 April 1945)
- Squadron Leader H R Allen (9 January 1946)
- Squadron Leader C H MacFie (26 October 1946)
- Flight Lieutenant N H D Ramsey (acting) (7 May 1947)
- Squadron Leader T R Burne (15 July 1947)
- Major R Olds (USAF) (4 February 1949)
- Squadron Leader T R Burne (1 October 1949)
- Major D F Smith (USAF) (10 January 1950)
- Squadron Leader J L W Ellacombe (18 August 1950)
- Squadron Leader R B Morison (21 November 1952)
- Squadron Leader D I Smith (27 July 1953)
- Squadron Leader F W Lister (1 December 1953)
- Flight Lieutenant H Irving (acting) (1 June 1955)
- Squadron Leader R S Kingsford (8 August 1956)
- Squadron Leader L de Garis, AFC (5 July 1958)
- Squadron Leader J J Phipps (1 December 1958)
- Squadron Leader P V Pledger (1 January 1961)
- Squadron Leader F L Travers-Smith (1 January 1963)
- Squadron Leader D C G Brook (28 December 1964)
- Squadron Leader G. Jones (1 November 1966)
- Squadron Leader L A B Baker (20 September 1968)
- Wing Commander J A Mansell (10 April 1969)
- Squadron Leader L A B Baker (21 May 1969)
- Wing Commander D Allison (4 August 1969)
- Squadron Leader L A B Baker (October 1969)
- Wing Commander K W Hayr (1 January 1970)
- Wing Commander E J E Smith (6 January 1972)
- Wing Commander P P W Taylor (3 December 1973)
- Wing Commander J G Saye (9 July 1976)
- Wing Commander R B Duckett (17 July 1978)
- Wing Commander P T Squire (26 March 1981)
- Wing Commander J D L Feesey (23 December 1983)
- Wing Commander I M Stewart (13 June 1986)
- Wing Commander I R Harvey (3 October 1988)
- Wing Commander C C N Burwell (17 May 1991)
- Wing Commander D Walker (29 April 1994)
- Wing Commander M A Leakey (18 March 1996)
- Wing Commander I Cameron (acting) (26 November 1997)
- Wing Commander A Golledge (9 January 1998)
- Wing Commander S M Bell (26 October 1999)
- Wing Commander M E Sampson (June 2004)
- Wing Commander K A Lewis (1 November 2006)
- Wing Commander D F Haines (31 October 2008)
- Wing Commander M Flewin (15 September 2012)
- Wing Commander M Sutton (9 October 2014)

== See also ==
- Armed forces in Scotland
- Military history of Scotland
