= William Roy Irwin =

- Born: 7 June 1898; Ripley, Ontario, Canada
- Died: 14 January 1969 (aged 70); Ottawa, Canada
- Military career
- Allegiance: Canada
- Branch: Canadian Expeditionary Force; Royal Naval Air Service; Royal Flying Corps
- Rank: Wing Commander
- Nickname: "Sambo"
- Unit: No. 56 Squadron RAF
- Awards: Order of the British Empire, Distinguished Flying Cross with Bar

Wing Commander William Roy Irwin DFC* OBE was a Canadian-born World War I flying ace credited with 11 aerial victories. In the process of becoming an ace, he rose as far as the rank of captain. During World War II, he returned to service, reached the rank of Wing Commander, and won an OBE.

== Early life ==
William Roy Irwin was born on 7 June 1898 in Ripley, Canada, to Marion Jane Reavie 1872-1918 and Robert Irwin 1869–1918. He was still living in Ripley when he enlisted on 16 June 1916. He traded the life of a student for the military. The physical description on his enlistment papers describes him as 5 feet 7 1/2 inches tall, with brown eyes, dark hair, and a "fresh" complexion.

== World War I ==
William Roy Irwin joined the Canadian Expeditionary Force with the aim of serving in the Royal Naval Air Service. Upon his arrival in Britain, he was switched to the Royal Flying Corps. On 22 November 1917, probationary second lieutenant W. R. Irwin was appointed a Flying Officer. This date also marked his later postdated promotion to lieutenant.

Once assigned to 56 Squadron at the combat front in France, Irwin flew his first patrol on 1 March 1918, as a Royal Aircraft Factory SE.5a pilot. He joined the war even as the Germans launched their last great offensive of the war. Two months later, on 3 May 1918, he joined Trevor Durrant and Edward Dawson Atkinson in destroying one German Rumpler two-seater reconnaissance plane and driving another down out of control. Then, on an evening patrol on 28 June, he destroyed an Albatros D.III fighter for his third win.

Irwin would not score again until 8 August 1918, when he destroyed a Fokker D.VII northeast of Chaulnes. He would proceed to score five more victories over Fokker D.VIIs that month. He destroyed two of them on the morning of 10 August and drove down another out of control in the evening; two days later, he destroyed another pair. On 28 August, he was awarded the Distinguished Flying Cross for his feats. That his award was for his air-to-air prowess is apparent in the citation accompanying the DFC:

This officer is a fine leader, displaying tactical skill and personal gallantry. On the 10th August he led his flight down to attack fifteen Fokkers. In the engagement that ensued he showed brilliant leadership and personal courage, accounting for two machines himself. He has destroyed five enemy aeroplanes and brought down three out of control.

Irwin destroyed another pair of Fokker D.VIIs on the morning of 3 September 1918, rounding out his total tally at nine enemy planes destroyed and two driven down out of control. However, on 15 September, he pounced on a decoy two-seater and was in turn jumped by four enemy fighters. He was wounded in action during the dogfight, but escaped. It was while he remained in hospital on 23 September that he was awarded a Bar in lieu of a second award of the DFC. Once again, the award citation stressed his aerial tactics and success:

This officer is an exceptionally skilful pilot leader, combining fine fighting qualities with sound, clear judgement. On the 12 August [1918] he led his patrol to attack a large formation of Fokker biplanes; he himself accounted for two of them. On a later date, attacking a formation of Fokker biplanes, he again destroyed two, the patrol accounting for two others.

Shortly thereafter, Irwin was discharged from hospital and assigned to instructor duty at the Central Flying School in Upavon. The war ended while he was in this assignment.

== Between the World Wars ==
On 28 September 1919, Irwin was transferred to unemployed list of the Royal Air Force. He returned to Canada for a university education. On 14 October 1921, he married Doris Isobel Dickin 1900–1992 at Weyburn, Saskatchewan, Canada. The union would produce two children: Roy Keith Irwin 1922-1942 and Doreen Marion Irwin 1924–2000. William & Doris later divorced.

== World War II and beyond ==
Irwin was a high school teacher in Saskatchewan until the beginning of World War II. He then joined the Royal Canadian Air Force, underwent refresher training, and became an instructor at No. 3 Elementary Flying School at Yorkton, Canada. He was subsequently appointed to command of No. 3 Service Flying Training School.

On 1 January 1944, Wing Commander Irwin was awarded Order of the British Empire for his efforts. He would serve through war's end, resigning from the RCAF in August 1945.

Towards the end of his life, Irwin served on the Canadian Transport Commission, reportedly from 20 September 1967 until 14 January 1969. Irwin died on 14 January 1969 in an Ottawa hospital. He was survived by his second wife Muriel Anne Storey 1904-1998 and his daughter Doreen. William Roy Irwin is buried with his second wife Muriel in Ripley-Huron Cemetery, Ripley, Huron Township, Bruce County, Ontario, Canada.
