= Edwin Cole (RAF officer) =

Edwin Stuart Travis Cole
- Born: 26 December 1895; Bristol, England
- Died: 1984 (aged 88–89)
- Military career
- Branch: British Army; Royal Air Force
- Service years: 1916–1918; 1939–1954
- Rank: Squadron Leader
- Units: No. 60 Squadron RFC; No. 1 Squadron RFC
- Awards: Military Cross
- Other work: Served during Second World War.

Squadron Leader Edwin Stuart Travis Cole MC (26 December 1895 – 1984) was a British World War I flying ace credited with eight aerial victories. He returned to military service in 1939 for the Second World War.

== Early life ==
Edwin Stuart Travis Cole was born in Bristol, England on 26 December 1895, to Ruben and Jessie Cole. He became a mechanical engineer.

== World War I service ==
Cole was awarded Aviator's Certificate No. 2160 on Caudron biplanes at the Ruffy-Baumann School at Hendon. He was commissioned as a probationary second lieutenant in the Royal Flying Corps on 29 April 1916, was appointed a flying officer on 21 July, and was confirmed in his rank in August. On 15 September 1916, having been assigned to No. 60 Squadron RFC to fly a Nieuport fighter, he scored his first victory.

Reassigned to No. 1 Squadron RFC, he once again flew a Nieuport. He triumphed twice in March 1917, and four times during Bloody April, including two observation balloons. On 1 May 1917, he and fellow ace Frank Sharpe captured a German Albatros D.III fighter at Roulers-Elverdinghe, receiving promotion to lieutenant the same day. Following this, Cole was withdrawn from action.

On 6 July 1918 he was promoted to the temporary rank of captain.

== World War II service ==
His record lapses until 1939, when he agreed to let a garage in Downend be used for a first aid post and air raid shelter. On 21 March 1939, he was commissioned as a pilot officer on probation in the Royal Air Force Volunteer Reserve. On 31 August 1939, he was confirmed as a pilot officer and promoted to flying officer.

Apparently unfit for flight duty, on 27 May 1940 he was transferred to General Duties. On 27 May 1941, he was promoted to flight lieutenant. On 1 July 1944, he was once again promoted, this time to temporary squadron leader.

== Post World War II ==
On 10 February 1954, Cole relinquished his reserve commission, with permission to retain the rank of squadron leader.

Edwin Stuart Travis Cole died in 1984 in Wiltshire, England.

== Honours and awards ==
Military Cross
2nd Lt. Edwin Stewart Travis Cole, Royal Flying Corps (Special Reserve)
For conspicuous gallantry and devotion to duty. On one occasion he, in a scout, attacked and brought down an enemy two-seater biplane. He has brought down two hostile balloons. He has at all times set a splendid example of courage and initiative.
