= Jagdstaffel 79 =

Jasta 79
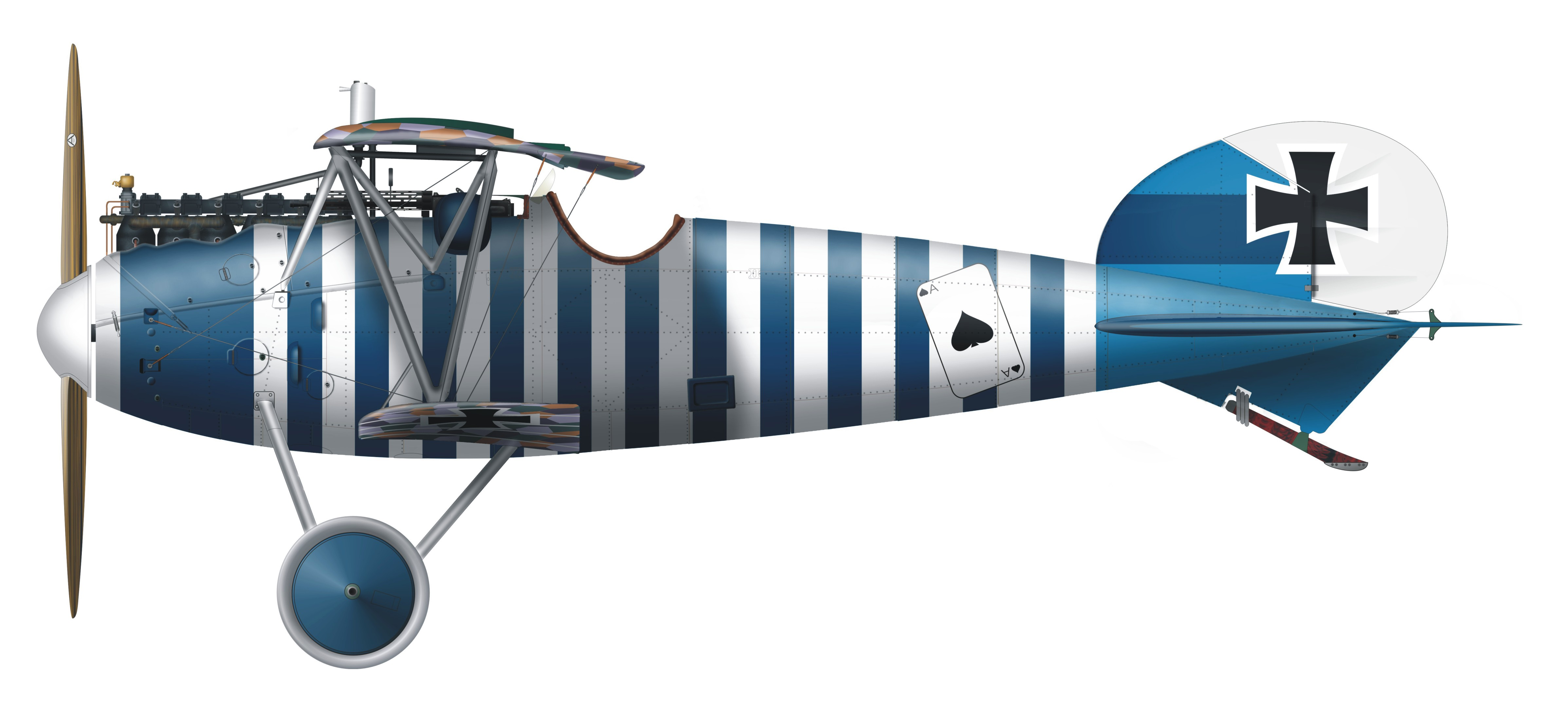
- Albatros D.Va of Hans Böhning, Jasta 79.
- Active: 1917–1918
- Country: Kingdom of Bavaria, German Empire
- Branch: Luftstreitkräfte
- Type: Fighter squadron
- Engagements: World War I

Royal Bavarian Jagdstaffel 79, commonly abbreviated to Jasta 79, was a "hunting group" (i.e., fighter squadron) of the Luftstreitkräfte, the air arm of the Imperial German Army during World War I. The squadron would score over 28 aerial victories during the war, including three observation balloons downed. The unit's victories came at the expense of four killed in action, three killed in flying accidents, 13 wounded in action, two injured in aviation accidents, and three taken prisoner of war.

== History ==
Jasta 79 was founded on 7 November 1917 at Fliegerersatz-Abteilung ("Replacement Detachment") 1, Schleißheim. It was activated on 28 January and posted to 3 Armee on 2 February 1918. The new squadron drew first blood on 22 March 1918. Also in March, they were reassigned to 18 Armee; they would remain in support of this army until war's end.

== Commanding officers (Staffelführer) ==
- Franz Xaver Danhuber: 28 January 1918 - 11 February 1918 (Injured in crash)
- Hans Böhning: 11 February 1918 - 22 September 1918 (WIA)
- Franz Xaver Danhuber: Early October 1918 - war's end

== Duty stations ==
- Thugny-Trugny, France: 2 February 1918
- Villeselve, France: 25 March 1918 - 9 August 1918
- Guise West, France: 6 September 1918 - 8 October 1918
- Thuilles: 29 October 1918

== Notable personnel ==
- Franz Xaver Danhuber
- Hans Bohning
- Roman Schneider

== Aircraft ==
Jasta 79 was initially equipped with Pfalz D.III fighters. They later re-equipped with Fokker D.VIIs. It also operated one or more Pfalz D.XII fighters.
