= William Victor Trevor Rooper =

British World War I flying ace

- Born: 10 May 1897; Chester, Cheshire, England
- Died: 9 October 1917 (aged 20); Polygon Wood, Zonnebeke, Belgium (KIA)
- Burial place: Bailleul Communal Cemetery Extension, Bailleul, Nord, France; 50°44′17″N 2°44′35″E
- Relatives: Sir Thomas Royden, 1st Baronet (grandfather)
- Military career
- Allegiance: United Kingdom
- Branch: British Army
- Service years: 1914–1917
- Rank: Captain
- Units: Denbighshire Hussars; No. 1 Squadron RFC
- Conflicts: World War I • Western Front
- Awards: Croix de Guerre (Belgium)

Captain William Victor Trevor Rooper (10 May 1897 – 9 October 1917) was a British World War I flying ace credited with eight aerial victories, before becoming Franz Xaver Danhuber's seventh victim.

== Biography ==
Rooper was the third and youngest son of Percy Lens Rooper and Alice Nancy (née Royden), the daughter of Sir Thomas Royden, 1st Baronet, MP. He was born in Chester, Cheshire, though the family later moved over the border into Wales, living at Gresford in Denbighshire. He was educated at Bilton Grange and Charterhouse schools, and on the outbreak of war in August 1914 enlisted into the Yeomanry, although still only 17. He served as a motorcycle despatch rider for five months, until on 23 December 1914 he was commissioned as a second lieutenant in the Denbighshire Hussars (Territorial Force).

He was seconded to the Royal Flying Corps in September 1916, and after completing his pilot training was posted to No. 1 Squadron RFC in April 1917, to fly the Nieuport 17 single-seat fighter. He was promoted to lieutenant on 1 July, and gained his first victory on 28 July, driving down 'out of control' an Albatros D.V over Becelaere. Two further victories followed in early August, and he was appointed a flight commander with the acting rank of captain on the 24th. After upgrading to the Nieuport 27, he gained three more victories in September, and his final two in early October. His final tally was three enemy aircraft destroyed, four driven down out of control (two shared), and one captured (shared).

On 9 October 1917 Rooper was shot down by Franz Xaver Danhuber of Jasta 26 over Polygon Wood and crashed near the British front lines, receiving fatal injuries. He is buried at the Communal Cemetery Extension in Bailleul, Nord, France.

Both Rooper and his older brother Ralph Bonfoy Rooper – killed in France on 29 May 1918 while serving in the French Red Cross – are commemorated on the war memorial in All Saints Church, Gresford. The oldest of the three brothers, Captain John Royden Rooper, served in the Denbighshire Hussars until ill-health forced him to relinquish his commission on 9 June 1916. The actress Jemima Rooper is his great-granddaughter.

== List of aerial victories ==
Combat record
No.	Date/Time	Aircraft/ Serial No.	Opponent	Result	Location	Notes
1	28 July 1917 @ 1910	Nieuport 17 (B1675)	Albatros D.V	Out of control	Becelaere	
2	9 August 1917 @ 1050	Nieuport 17 (B1675)	C	Captured	Houthoulst Forest	Shared with Captain Philip Fullard.
3	17 August 1917 @ 1015	Nieuport 17 (B1675)	DFW C	Out of control	Tenbrielen	Shared with Lieutenant Charles Lavers.
4	11 September 1917 @ 1815	Nieuport 27 (B3632)	Albatros D.V	Out of control	Houthoulst	
5	19 September 1917 @ 1800	Nieuport 27 (B6767)	Albatros D.V	Destroyed in flames	East of Poelcapelle	
6	25 September 1917 @ 1830	Nieuport 27 (B6767)	Albatros D.V	Destroyed	East of Gheluvelt	
7	1 October 1917 @ 1110	Nieuport 27 (B6767)	DFW C	Out of control	Houthoulst	Shared with Captain Robert Birkbeck, and Second Lieutenants Francis George Baker & Lumsden Cummings.
8	5 October 1917 @ 0955	Nieuport 27 (B6767)	Albatros D.V	Destroyed	Zandvoorde	
