= Edward Dawson Atkinson =

British military officer, aviator and flying ace

- Born: 10 November 1891; Calcutta, India
- Died: 24 June 1954; Gartnavel Royal Hospital, Glasgow
- Spouse: Nancy Rowan (m. 1918 at Auld Kirk of Ayr)
- Military career
- Allegiance: United Kingdom
- Branch: British Indian Army; Royal Air Force
- Rank: Second Lieutenant; Squadron Leader
- Nickname: "Spider"
- Units: No. 1 Squadron RFC; No. 56 Squadron RAF; No. 64 Squadron RAF; 40th Pathans
- Commands: No. 1 Squadron RAF
- Conflicts: World War I
- Awards: Distinguished Flying Cross; Air Force Cross 1914 Star & Bar (Cpl. 35/Div. Sig. Coy); British War Medal; Victory Medal (Capt. R.A.F.); King Faisal Active Service War Medal

Edward Dawson Atkinson, DFC, AFC (10 November 1891 – 1934) was a British military officer, aviator, and a flying ace of the First World War, credited with a total of 10 aerial victories while serving in three different squadrons. He would serve postwar in the Royal Air Force until invalided out due to ill health. He then turned to a business career.

== Early life ==
Atkinson was the son of Joseph Henry Atkinson and Elizabeth Mary M'Carthy, and was born in Calcutta, India, on 10 November 1891, when it was still part of the British Empire. He became an officer in the 40th Pathans of the British Indian Army.

== First World War ==
On 12 December 1915, Second Lieutenant Edward Dawson Atkinson of the 40th Pathans was awarded Royal Aero Club Aviator's Certificate no. 2145 after training at the London and Provincial School, Hendon.

On 25 January 1917, he was already a pilot officer; on that date, he was appointed flight commander and acting captain. Two months later, on 25 March, while serving in No. 1 Squadron on the Western Front, he used a Nieuport to destroy a German observation balloon. He drove down two enemy planes in April, an Albatros D.II fighter on 22 April and an Albatros reconnaissance craft on 29 April. He would not score again for over a year.

Atkinson was reassigned to No. 56 Squadron, which was equipped with Royal Aircraft Factory SE.5as. On 3 May 1918, in conjunction with William Roy Irwin and Trevor Durrant, he destroyed a Rumpler in one dogfight, and drove another down out of control 20 minutes later. Atkinson was now an ace.

A transfer to No. 64 Squadron quickly ensued. Still flying a SE.5a, Atkinson ran off a string of five more victories during the last week of May 1918. His final count came to a balloon and four enemy planes destroyed, and five more enemy planes driven down out of control while he was in France.

On 2 July 1918, Atkinson was awarded the Distinguished Flying Cross for his exploits. It would be announced in the London Gazette on 3 August 1918:

A brilliant fighting pilot whose flight has proved very successful under his leadership, often in combats where the enemy formation was numerically superior. Capt. Atkinson destroyed single-handed five enemy machines during May, and previously, whilst serving with another squadron, he brought down two enemy aeroplanes and one balloon.

== Post-war ==
On 1 January 1919, Atkinson was awarded the Air Force Cross. He remained in service during the postwar demobilization.

On 14 September 1923, he was assigned to aviation duty in Iraq; records disagree as to whether he served with either No. 8 Squadron RAF or No. 84 Squadron RAF. Shortly thereafter, on 1 January 1924, he was promoted to squadron leader. On 25 May 1924, he was given command of No. 1 Squadron in Iraq.

He then returned to England; on 2 April 1926 he was posted to RAF Uxbridge as a transfer to Home Establishment. He was still tasked as Commanding Officer of 1 Squadron before November 1926, when it was drawn down from Iraq in cadre status, and then returned to England; it is unknown whether this was a continuing appointment or a reappointment. He was the commanding officer again (or still) on 11 April 1927, in time to lead No. 1 Squadron for manoeuvres in late July and early August 1927. On 2 January 1928, he was again posted to RAF Uxbridge. On 1 September 1928, he was posted to No. 21 Group RAF HQ, RAF West Drayton. On 1 August 1930, he was once again posted to RAF Uxbridge.

On 21 October 1930, Atkinson was placed on half pay, Scale A. He remained in this status until 16 March 1931, when he was restored to full pay and posted to No. 10 Group RAF HQ at RAF Lee-on-Solent.

On 18 January 1932, Edward Dawson Atkinson was invalided into retirement from the Royal Air Force.

On 29 March 1934, he was chairman of R. J. Barnett & Coley Limited in New Malden, Surrey, when it was voluntarily liquidated. Atkinson was one of the two appointed liquidators.

Nothing is known of him after that.
