= Robert A. Birkbeck =

British World War I flying ace (1898–1938)

Robert Alexander Birkbeck
- Born: 8 October 1898; Bournemouth, England or Edinburgh, Scotland
- Died: 9 January 1938 (aged 39); Oxted, Surrey, England
- Burial place: St Peter's Church, Tandridge, Surrey, England
- Military career
- Allegiance: United Kingdom
- Branch: British Army; Royal Air Force
- Service years: 1916–1931
- Rank: Captain
- Unit: No. 1 Squadron RFC
- Awards: Distinguished Flying Cross

Captain Robert Alexander Birkbeck DFC (8 October 1898 – 9 January 1938), was a British World War I flying ace credited with 10 aerial victories.

== World War I service ==
Birkbeck received the Royal Aero Club certificate No. 3157 on 23 June 1916 to qualify as a pilot. He was appointed a temporary probationary second lieutenant on 4 March 1917. He was appointed a flying officer in the Royal Flying Corps on 7 May 1917. He was confirmed in his rank on 1 June 1917. He joined No. 1 Squadron RFC on 10 June 1917.

He flew Nieuport fighter No. B1582 to his first victory on 22 July 1917. He used the same plane for two more wins in August; he then switched to Nieuport No. B6753 for his next six triumphs, all scored in October 1917. He wrapped up his score with his tenth win in Nieuport No. B6826, making him a double ace. His final tally was three enemy airplanes destroyed, and seven driven down out of control; one of the out of control victories was shared with Captain William Victor Trevor Rooper and two other pilots.

On 3 November 1917 he was appointed a flight commander with the temporary rank of captain. Birkbeck left the front for England in February 1918. He received the Distinguished Flying Cross on 3 June 1918.

== Post-war ==
Birkbeck was transferred to the unemployed list on 23 May 1919, but was granted a short service commission on 8 June 1920, when he was promoted from flying officer to flight lieutenant, later amended to date from 12 May 1920.

Birkbeck later became shipbroker, and resided at Stack House, Oxted, until his death on 9 January 1938.
