= William Wendell Rogers =

Canadian flying ace

- Born: 10 November 1896; Alberton, Prince Edward Island, Canada
- Died: 11 January 1967 (aged 70); Saint John, New Brunswick, Canada
- Military career
- Allegiance: George V of the British Empire
- Branch: Royal Flying Corps
- Rank: Captain
- Unit: No. 1 Squadron RFC
- Awards: Military Cross

Captain William Wendell Rogers MC (10 November 1896 – 11 January 1967) was a Canadian World War I flying ace credited with nine aerial victories. He singlehandedly shot down a Gotha G bomber.

== Early life ==
William Wendell Rogers was born in Alberton, Prince Edward Island, Canada.

== World War I service ==
Rogers was appointed a Flying Officer on 25 April 1917. On 12 July 1917, he scored the first of a run of six "out of control" victories over enemy Albatros fighter planes, with the string ending 29 October 1917. On 18 November 1917 he was appointed Flight Commander.

On 12 December 1917, he shot down a huge Gotha G bomber piloted by German Blue Max winner Hauptmann Rudolf Kleine, killing Kleine and his three crew members.

Rogers went on to two additional "out of control" victories, with his last win coming on 18 December 1917.

== Postwar life ==
He returned to Saint John, Canada, to operate an automobile concern. He became active in the local flying club. He died on 11 January 1967 (aged 70) in Saint John, New Brunswick.

== Honors and awards ==
Military Cross (MC)

2nd Lt. (T./Capt.) William Wendell Rogers, R.F.C., Spec. Res.

"For conspicuous gallantry and devotion to duty in shooting down seven enemy airplanes, and on two occasions attacking enemy troops with machine gun fire from very low altitudes".
