= Percy Jack Clayson =

British flying ace

- Born: 7 June 1896; New Cross, London, England
- Died: 1970 (aged 73–74); Renfrew, Scotland
- Military career
- Allegiance: United Kingdom
- Branch: Royal Navy; British Army; Royal Air Force
- Service years: 1914–1929; 1941–1954
- Rank: Flight Lieutenant
- Nickname: Pip
- Conflicts: World War I World War II
- Awards: Military Cross; Distinguished Flying Cross

Percy Jack Clayson MC, DFC (7 June 1896 – 1970) was a British flying ace in the First World War credited with 29 victories.

== Biography ==
=== Early life and education ===
Clayson was born in New Cross, London on 7 June 1896. In the 1910 Census of Watford, he is listed as a 14-year-old pupil at the Royal Masonic School for Boys at Bushey.

=== First World War ===
Clayson joined the Royal Naval Air Service at the outbreak of war and served in France from December 1914. He then transferred to the Royal Flying Corps, being appointed a probationary temporary second lieutenant on the General List on 19 July 1917, and was confirmed in the rank on 28 September. On 30 September 1917 he was awarded his Royal Aero Club Aviators License (No. 5617) after flying a Curtiss Biplane at the Military School at Beverley. He joined No. 1 Squadron on 31 October 1917.

Clayson gained his first victory on 16 February 1918. He was awarded the Military Cross on 9 April, and on 8 May was appointed a flight commander with the rank of acting captain. On 12 June 1918, he was cited for the Distinguished Flying Cross (DFC) and by 14 July had achieved a total of 29 credited victories; 1 shared destroyed balloon, 1 (and 1 shared) aircraft captured, 9 (and 9 shared) aircraft destroyed, and 5 (and 3 shared) aircraft 'out of control'.

He was invested with his DFC on 24 July 1919 by King George V at Buckingham Palace. Clayson was posted to Home Establishment on 3 August 1918, ending his involvement in direct engagement with the enemy.

=== Later military service ===
On 24 October 1919 he was granted a short service commission in the Royal Air Force with the rank of flying officer. He served during the 1920s with Nos. 6 and 70 Squadrons. On 1 July 1925 he was promoted to flight lieutenant, and on 9 July was posted to No. 23 Squadron at RAF Henlow. On 21 September 1926 he was posted to the Aircraft Depot, Iraq, finally returning to the UK to serve at the RAF Depot at RAF Uxbridge from 14 November 1928. He was placed on the retired list due to ill health on 16 April 1929.

On 7 September 1929, at Our Lady of Victories Church, Kensington, he married Kathleen Thornton of Kelvingrove, Glasgow. In 1936 Clayson was the chief ground instructor at the Civil Training Flying School operated by the Bristol Aeroplane Company at Yatesbury.

During World War II Clayson returned to active service in the Royal Air Force Volunteer Reserve being appointed a flying officer in the Administrative and Special Duties Branch on 20 December 1941. He was promoted to flight lieutenant on 1 January 1944. Clayson remained in the Air Force Reserve of Officers until finally relinquishing his commission on 10 February 1954.

Clayson died in 1970 in Renfrew, Scotland.

== Honours and awards ==
- Temporary 2nd Lieutenant Percy Jack Clayson, General List and RFC, is awarded the Military Cross:

For conspicuous gallantry and devotion to duty. When on low-flying offensive patrol, he engaged an enemy scout and shot it down, with the result it crashed to earth. He has brought down several hostile machines, one of which was forced to land in our lines, and has engaged massed enemy troops and transport from a very low altitudes with machine-gun fire, inflicting heavy casualties. He has displayed the most marked determination, courage and skill.

— London Gazette, 22 June 1918

- Lieutenant (Temporary Captain) Percy Jack Clayson, MC, is awarded the Distinguished Flying Cross:

A patrol leader of great skill, and a skilful marksman, whose personal fighting successes have proved of much value to his squadron. Captain Clayson's patrol frequently encountered enemy formations in superior numbers, but invariably succeeded in inflicting serious losses.

— London Gazette, 3 August 1918
