= Henry Lardner-Burke =

South African flying ace of World War II

Henry Patrick Lardner-Burke
- Born: 27 June 1916; Harrismith, Orange Free State
- Died: 4 February 1970 (aged 53)
- Military career
- Branch: Royal Air Force
- Rank: Wing Commander
- Nickname: Pat
- Commands: No. 1 Squadron RAF
- Conflicts: World War II
- Awards: Distinguished Flying Cross and bar

Henry Patrick Lardner-Burke DFC (1916-1970) was a South African flying ace of World War II, credited with 7.5 'kills'.

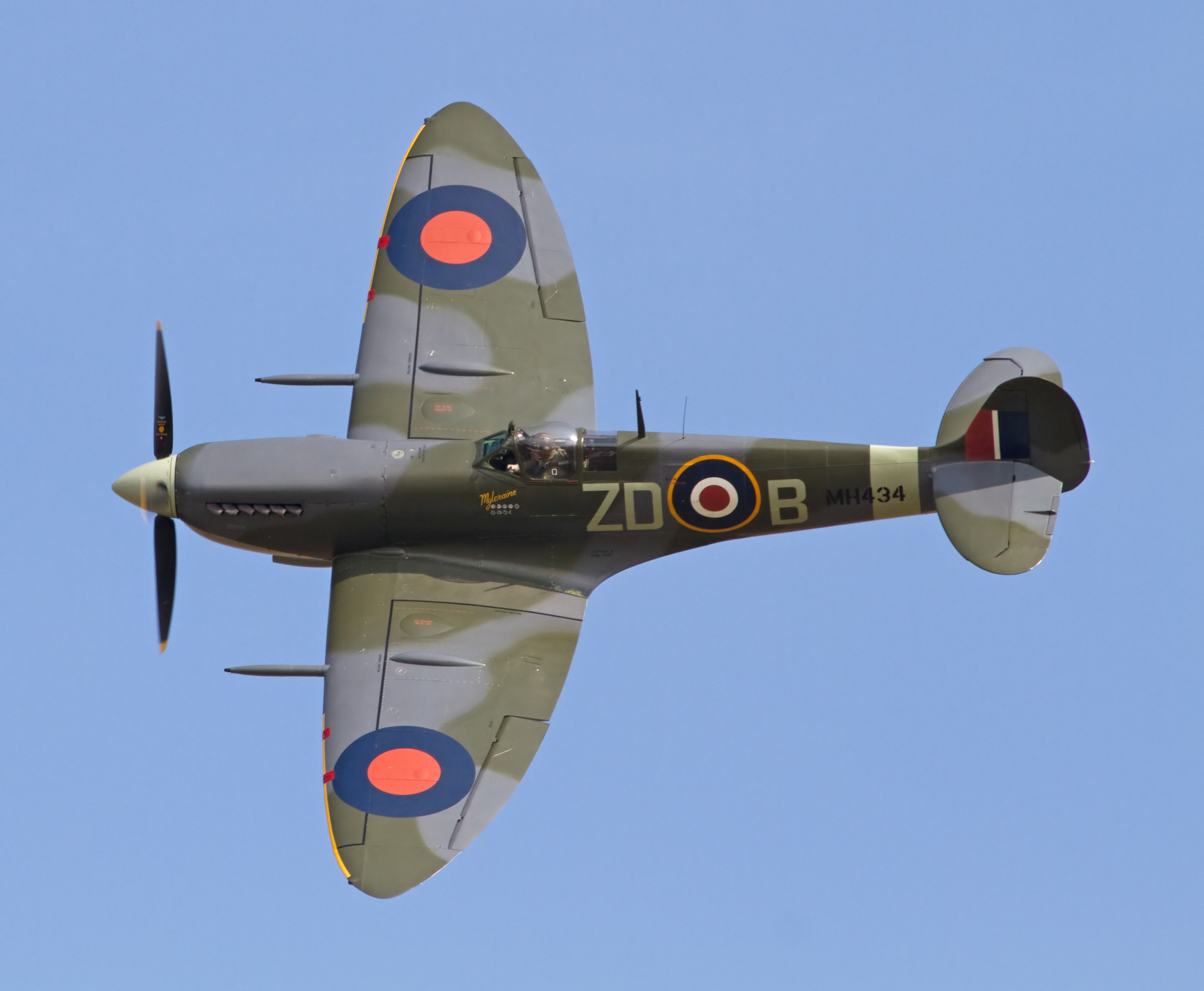
Spitfire flown by Lardner-Burke

Enlisting in the Royal Air Force, he started light training in early 1940. In 1941 he was posted to 19 Squadron, after which he joined 46 Squadron in May 1941. In June 1941, the squadron moved to Malta.

On 8 November 1941 hit by a 12.7 mm round just behind left armpit, after leaving most of itself inside, it came out about quarter inch from his left nipple, it pierced the armour plating of his Hurricane BD789 behind. He was hit and shot down from close behind at an angle by a Macchi fighter. He tried to bail out, but failed and managed to land safely in Malta. The injury was serious and put him out of the action for several months.

His DFC citation reads:

In November 1941, this officer was the pilot of one of 4 aircraft which engaged a force of 18 hostile aircraft over Malta and destroyed 3 and seriously damaged 2 of the enemy’s aircraft. During the combat Pilot Officer Lardner-Burke, who destroyed 1 of the enemy’s aircraft, was wounded in the chest and his aircraft was badly damaged. Despite this, he skillfully evaded his opponents and made a safe landing on the aerodrome; he then collapsed. Throughout the engagement, this officer displayed leadership and courage of a high order. He has destroyed 5 enemy aircraft over Malta.

In May 1942 he joined Gunnery Instruction Training Wing until March 1943, when he received new posting to 222 Squadron as a Flight Commander. On 27.8.43 he claimed 1-0-1 Fw 190 on 18.30-20.10 sortie flying Spitfire MH434/ZD-B. He was flying as Red 3 and at first damaged one, later shot down Focke-Wulf that crashed near Audruicq. F/O Hasselyn (Blue 3) claimed Fw 190 destroyed 10–15 m N. of Guînes flying MH428 and F/O Otto Smik (Red 4) flying MH430 claimed the third as destroyed and his pilot bailed out. That Focke-Wulf attempted to attack Burke. We know, that 8./JG 26 lost two Fw 190s with both pilots bailed out successfully. On 8 September he was flying as Blue 1 and with F/O Smik (Blue 2, MH390) attacked leading enemy fighter aircraft. It was seen to crash S.E. of Boulogne-sur-Mer by P/O T. Willie (Blue 3, MH491). They both claimed Me 109F destroyed. We only know that JG 26 loss doesn't fit in time and place. The same situation was with two Focke-Wulfs.

In April 1944, he was appointed Officer Commanding of No. 1 Squadron RAF and in December 1944 of RAF Church Fenton He was awarded a bar to his DFC in February 1945.

== Post war ==
After the war he moved to the Isle of Man and died in 1970.
