= Harold Albert Kullberg =

American flying ace (1896–1924)

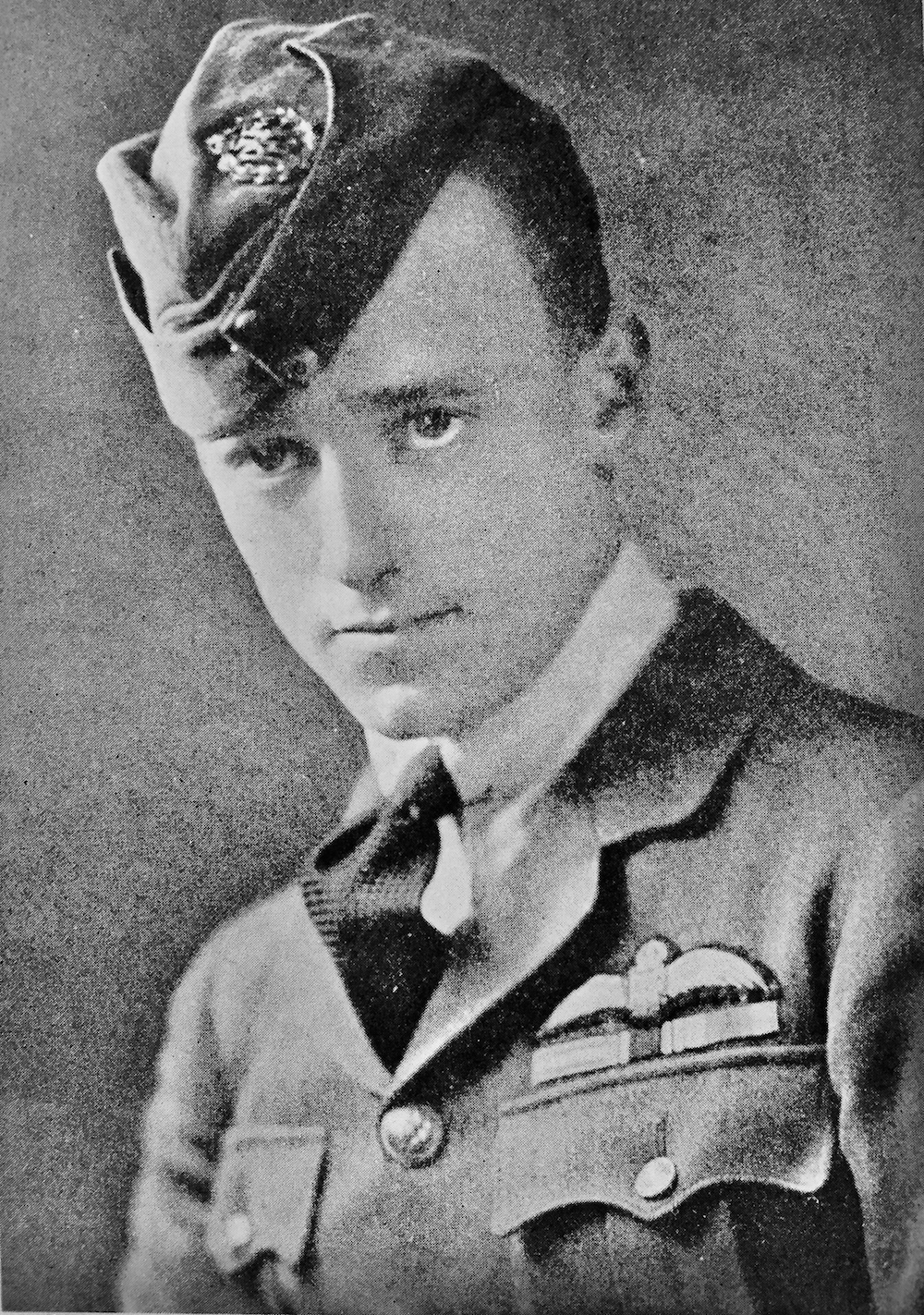
- Harold Albert Kullberg, 1919
- Born: 10 September 1896; Somerville, Massachusetts, USA
- Died: 5 August 1924 (aged 27); Vicinity of Hudson, Ohio, USA
- Military career
- Allegiance: United States
- Branch: Royal Air Force (United Kingdom)
- Service years: 1917–1918
- Rank: Captain
- Unit: Royal Air Force: No. 1 Squadron RFC
- Conflicts: World War I
- Awards: Distinguished Flying Cross
- Other work: President of the Akron Aeronautical Association

Captain Harold Albert Kullberg (10 September 1896 – 5 August 1924) was a World War I flying ace credited with 19 aerial victories. Though he scored his victories with the Royal Air Force, Kullberg was an American citizen. He was rejected for training as an American pilot because he was too short. He then joined the Royal Flying Corps in Canada on 7 August 1917.

== Biography ==
He was born on 10 September 1896 in Somerville, Massachusetts.

He joined No. 1 Squadron RAF in May 1918. He was an immediate success flying the RAF SE.5a, scoring pairs of victories on 27 and 28 May, 1 and 9 June. His next victory, his ninth, was over an observation balloon. He continued scoring apace through June and July. August and September brought his final five victories, all over German Fokker D.VIIs. The wingmen of his final victory on 16 September 1918 pursued him and inflicted three leg wounds on him. Kullberg sat out the rest of the war. It took six months for Kullberg to heal. He served until his release from service in July 1919.

Kullberg became involved in civil aviation. He even made the nation's first arrest for violation of air traffic rules. On 3 November 1923, Kullberg chased down someone who was stunt flying over an urban area, landed with them, and arrested them.

He became president of the Akron Aeronautical Association.

On 5 August 1924, he died in an air crash while instructing a student pilot.

== Honors and awards ==
Distinguished Flying Cross (DFC)

"This officer has destroyed six enemy aeroplanes and has taken part in seven engagements when others have been destroyed by members of his patrol. A bold and keen officer who possesses a fine fighting spirit." DFC citation, London Gazette, November 2, 1918.

== See also ==
- List of World War I flying aces from the United States
