= Henry Burke (politician) =

Jamaican politician and entrepreneur

Henry Burke (died 1827) was the owner of the Silver Mount estate in Portland Parish, Jamaica. He was elected to the House of Assembly of Jamaica in 1820. A monument to him exists in Christ Church, Port Antonio.
