= Vassincourt =

- Commune
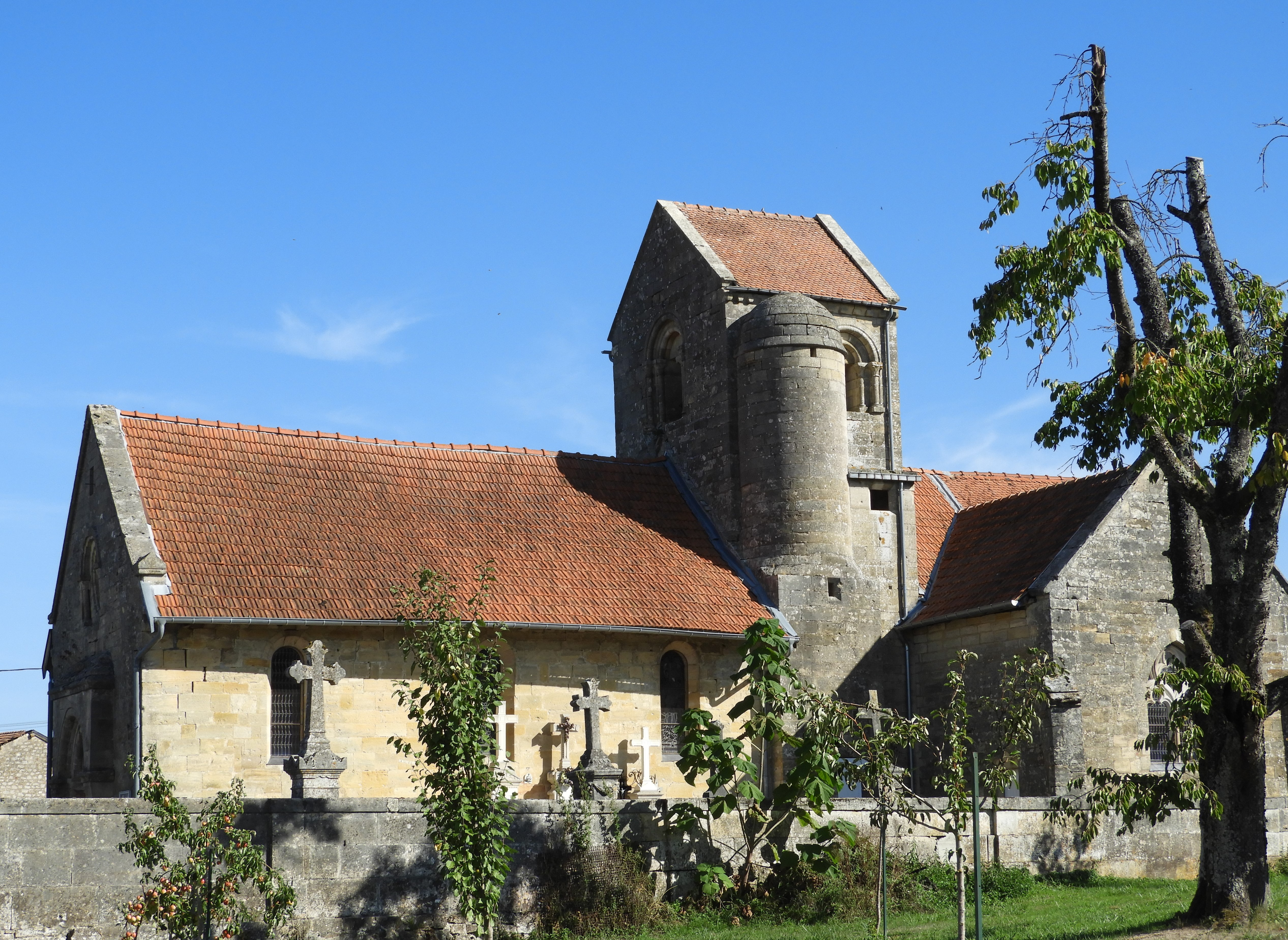
- The church in Vassincourt

- Coat of arms
- Location of Vassincourt
- Location within France Location within Grand Est
- Coordinates: 48°48′14″N 5°01′48″E
- Country: France
- Region: Grand Est
- Department: Meuse
- Arrondissement: Bar-le-Duc
- Canton: Revigny-sur-Ornain
- Intercommunality: CC du Pays de Revigny-sur-Ornain

Government
  - Mayor (2020–2026): Roger Collignon
- Area^{1}: 7.94 km^{2} (3.07 sq mi)
- Elevation: 186 m (610 ft)
- Highest elevation: 193 m (633 ft)
- Lowest elevation: 141 m (463 ft)
- Population (2023): 274
  - Density: 34.5/km^{2} (89.4/sq mi)
- Time zone: UTC+01:00 (CET)
  - Summer (DST): UTC+02:00 (CEST)
- INSEE/Postal code: 55531 /55800
- ^{1} French Land Register data, which excludes lakes, ponds, glaciers > 1 km^{2} (0.386 sq mi or 247 acres) and river estuaries.

Vassincourt (French pronunciation: [vasɛ̃kuʁ]) is a commune in the Meuse department in Grand Est in north-eastern France.

== Climate ==
On average, Vassincourt experiences 50.2 days per year with a minimum temperature below 0 °C (32.0 °F), 1.0 days per year with a minimum temperature below −10 °C (14.0 °F), 5.8 days per year with a maximum temperature below 0 °C (32.0 °F), and 16.7 days per year with a maximum temperature above 30 °C (86.0 °F). The record high temperature was 43.2 °C (109.8 °F) on 27 June 2026, while the record low temperature was −17.4 °C (0.7 °F) on December 20, 2009.

Climate data for Vassincourt (1991–2020 normals, extremes 2005–present)
Month	Jan	Feb	Mar	Apr	May	Jun	Jul	Aug	Sep	Oct	Nov	Dec	Year
Record high °C (°F)	16.1 (61.0)	21.1 (70.0)	26.6 (79.9)	29.4 (84.9)	33.3 (91.9)	43.2 (109.8)	41.7 (107.1)	39.5 (103.1)	35.6 (96.1)	29.2 (84.6)	22.6 (72.7)	17.3 (63.1)	43.2 (109.8)
Mean daily maximum °C (°F)	6.0 (42.8)	7.4 (45.3)	11.6 (52.9)	16.8 (62.2)	19.8 (67.6)	23.5 (74.3)	26.4 (79.5)	25.3 (77.5)	21.5 (70.7)	16.2 (61.2)	10.5 (50.9)	6.8 (44.2)	16.0 (60.8)
Daily mean °C (°F)	3.5 (38.3)	4.2 (39.6)	7.1 (44.8)	11.1 (52.0)	14.3 (57.7)	17.8 (64.0)	20.2 (68.4)	19.5 (67.1)	15.9 (60.6)	12.0 (53.6)	7.5 (45.5)	4.2 (39.6)	11.4 (52.6)
Mean daily minimum °C (°F)	0.9 (33.6)	1.0 (33.8)	2.7 (36.9)	5.4 (41.7)	8.8 (47.8)	12.0 (53.6)	13.9 (57.0)	13.6 (56.5)	10.3 (50.5)	7.9 (46.2)	4.5 (40.1)	1.7 (35.1)	6.9 (44.4)
Record low °C (°F)	−11.6 (11.1)	−14.4 (6.1)	−7.3 (18.9)	−5.0 (23.0)	−1.3 (29.7)	2.8 (37.0)	5.2 (41.4)	5.4 (41.7)	1.5 (34.7)	−4.5 (23.9)	−7.1 (19.2)	−17.4 (0.7)	−17.4 (0.7)
Average precipitation mm (inches)	74.7 (2.94)	76.3 (3.00)	69.6 (2.74)	47.5 (1.87)	81.8 (3.22)	63.6 (2.50)	62.3 (2.45)	81.2 (3.20)	63.6 (2.50)	75.9 (2.99)	76.9 (3.03)	97.6 (3.84)	871.0 (34.29)
Average precipitation days (≥ 1.0 mm)	13.3	12.0	11.3	7.8	12.9	9.6	8.2	9.3	7.8	11.3	13.3	14.7	131.5
Source: Meteociel

== See also ==
- Communes of the Meuse department
