= Women's Royal Air Force =

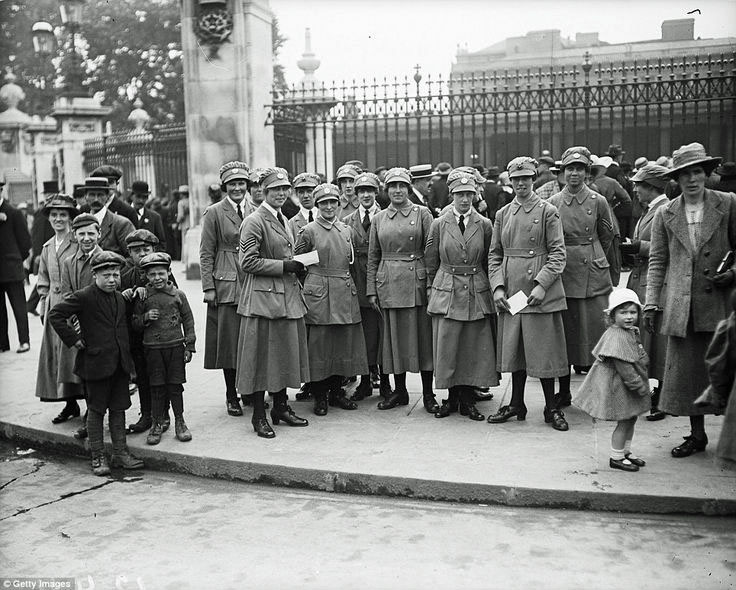
- 25 July 1919: King's Open Court, Buckingham Palace tribute to WWI Workers. – shown: members of the Women's Royal Air Force.
- Active: 1918–1920; 1949–1994
- Country: United Kingdom
- Allegiance: United Kingdom
- Branch: Royal Air Force
- Role: Support services
- Size: Peak of ~25,000 (1918–1920)
- Garrison/HQ: RAF Hawkinge

Commanders
- Last Director WRAF: Air Commodore Ruth Montague
- Air Chief Commandant: Princess Alice, Duchess of Gloucester

The Women's Royal Air Force (WRAF) was the women's branch of the Royal Air Force. It existed in two separate incarnations: the Women's Royal Air Force from 1918 to 1920 and the Women's Royal Air Force from 1949 to 1994.

On 1 February 1949, the name of the First World War organisation was revived when the Women's Auxiliary Air Force, which had been founded in 1939, was re-established on a regular footing as the Women's Royal Air Force. The WRAF and the RAF grew closer over the following decades, with increasing numbers of trades opened to women, and the two services formally merged in 1994, marking the full assimilation of women into the British forces and the end of the Women's Royal Air Force.

The Central Band of the WRAF, one of only two all-female bands in the British Armed Forces, was disbanded in 1972. Some of its musicians transferred to the Band of the Women's Royal Army Corps.

Women were only permitted to become aircrew as air loadmasters and air stewards until 1989, when all flying posts were opened to women, although they were not permitted to become aircrew on fast jets until 1994.

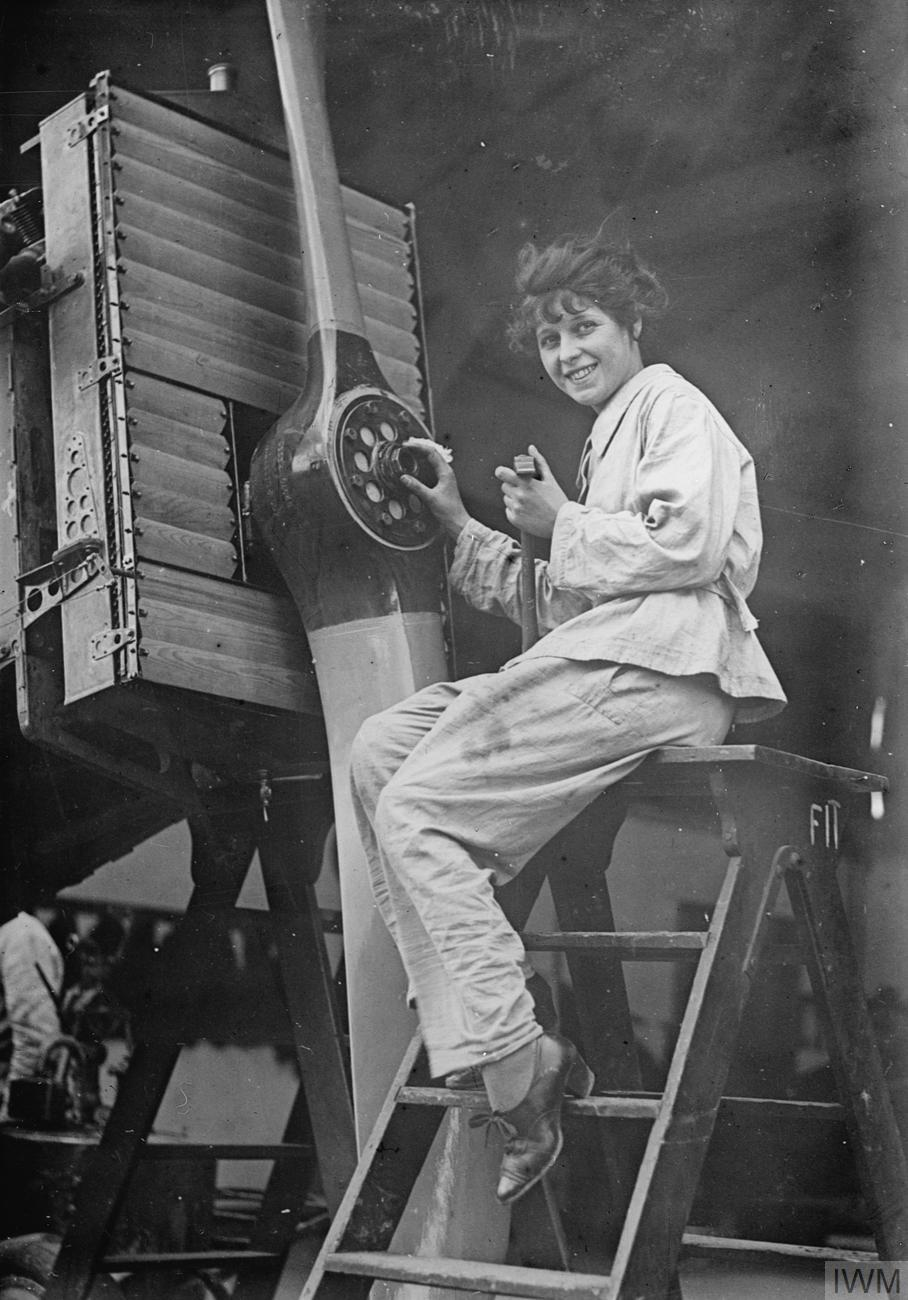
A fitter of the Women's Royal Air Force working on the Liberty engine of a De Havilland Airco DH.9A.

== Strength ==
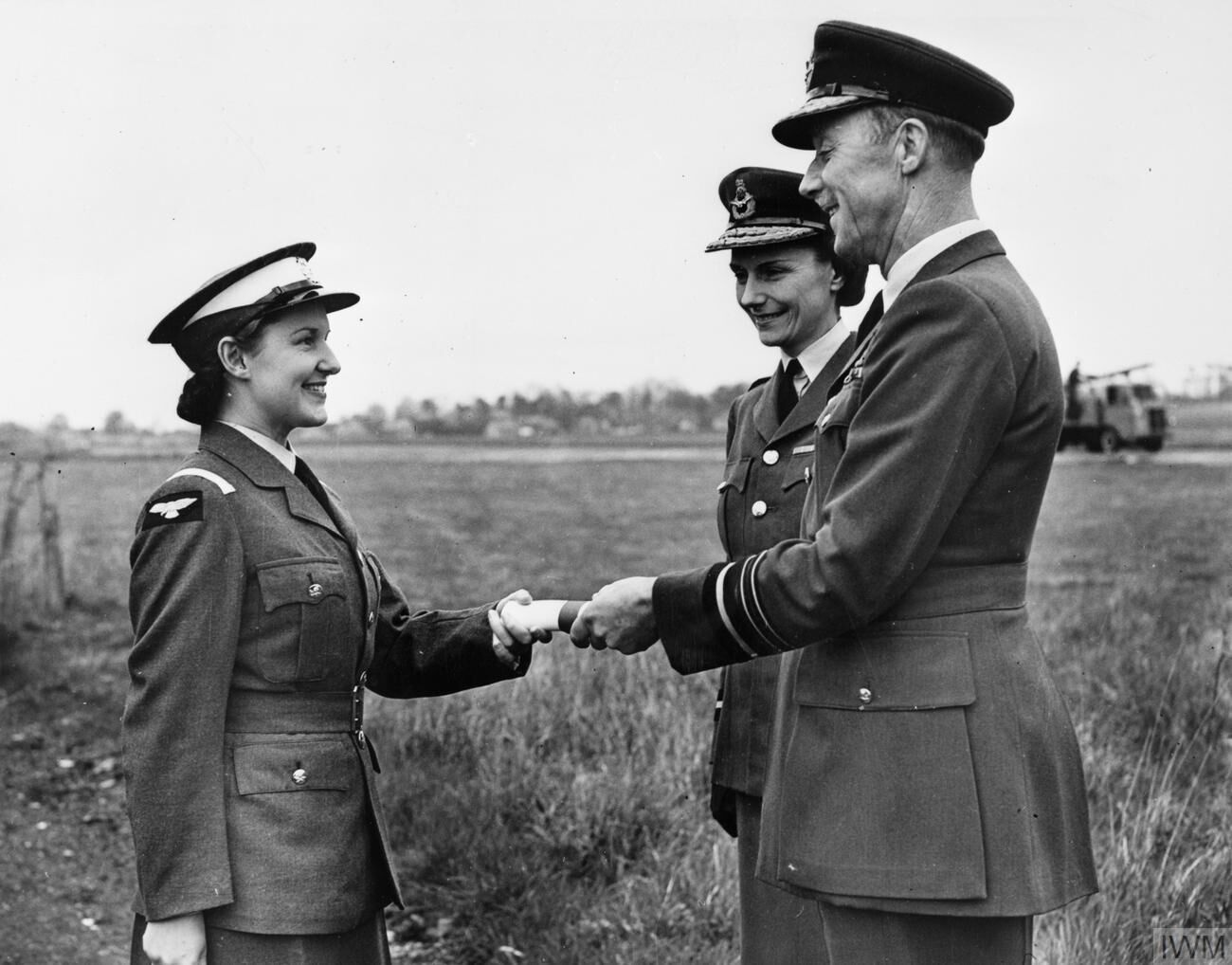
The Best Cadet receives her certificate from Air Marshal Sir Arthur Sanders and Air Commandant Dame Felicity Hanbury, the first Director of the Women's Royal Air Force, at RAF Hawkinge.

The target strength had been a force of around 90,000, figures are unreliable until 1 August 1918, when the strength was 15,433, approximately 5,000 recruits and 10,000 transferred from the predecessor organisations. The first incarnation never exceeded 25,000.

== Depots ==
Depots were opened in 1918 at Handsworth College, in Glasgow, at RAF Flowerdown, RAF Spitalgate, near Grantham, and at York. In the 1950s the WRAF Depot and WRAF Officer Cadet Training Unit were opened at RAF Hawkinge in Kent.

== Ranks ==
The WRAF inherited its rank structure from its predecessor, the WAAF. As with WAAF practice (from 1940), other ranks held standard RAF ranks, but officers used a separate ranking system until 1968, when they too adopted RAF officer ranks.

NATO code	OF-10	OF-9	OF-8	OF-7	OF-6	OF-5	OF-4	OF-3	OF-2	OF-1
Women's Royal Air Force (1949–1968)
Women's Royal Air Force (1949–1968)				Air chief commandant (Note: An honorary rank held only by Princess Alice, Duchess of Gloucester, who held it as a rank (until 1968) and later an appointment throughout the WRAF's existence. On 1 April 1994 her title changed to Air chief commandant for Women, RAF, by which time she held the rank of Air chief marshal.)	Air commandant	Group officer	Wing officer	Squadron officer	Flight officer	Section officer	Assistant section officer
Royal Air Force
Royal Air Force	Marshal of the RAF	Air chief marshal	Air marshal	Air vice-marshal	Air commodore	Group captain	Wing commander	Squadron leader	Flight lieutenant	Flying officer	Pilot officer /acting pilot officer

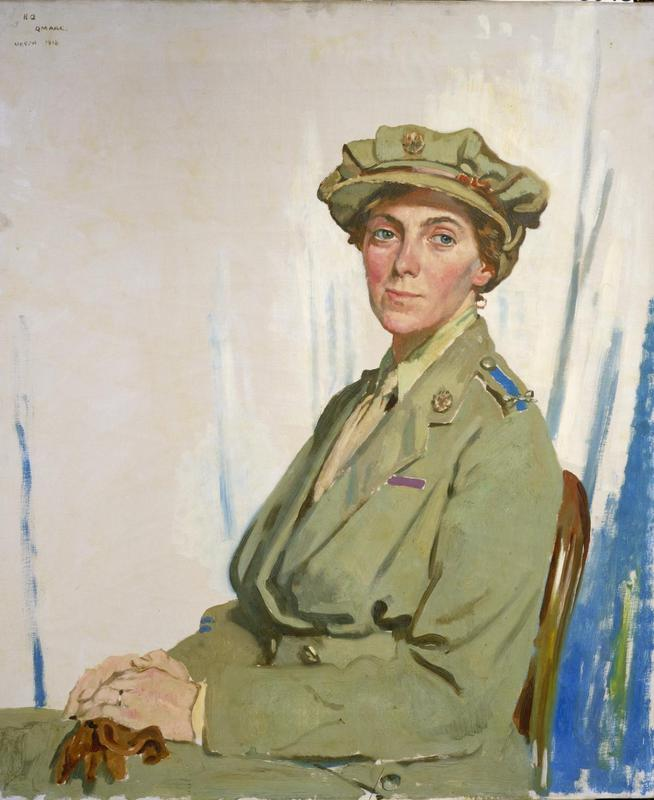
Dame Helen Gwynne-Vaughan, GBE, WRAF Commandant 1918–1920.

These ranks were introduced in 1949. The First World War service used different ranks.

== List of Commandants WRAF ==
- Gertrude Crawford, 1918
- Violet Douglas-Pennant, May–September 1918
- Helen Gwynne-Vaughan, September 1918 – 1920

== List of Directors WRAF ==
- Air Commandant Dame Felicity Hanbury, 1949–1950
- Air Commandant Dame Nancy Salmon, 1950–1956
- Air Commandant Dame Henrietta Barnett, 1956–1960
- Air Commandant Dame Anne Stephens, 1960–1963
- Air Commandant Dame Jean Conan Doyle, 1963–1966
- Air Commodore Dame Felicity Hill, 1966–1969
- Air Commodore Philippa Marshall, 1969–1973
- Air Commodore Molly Allott, 1973–1976
- Air Commodore Joy Tamblin, 1976–1980
- Air Commodore Helen Renton, 1980–1986
- Air Commodore Shirley Jones, 1986–1989
- Air Commodore Ruth Montague, 1989–1994

== See also ==
- Air Transport Auxiliary
- Patricia Howard
- Women Airforce Service Pilots, US equivalent
- Women's Royal Army Corps
- Women's Royal Naval Service
