= Helen Renton =

Scottish air force officer (1931–2016)

- Born: Helen Ferguson Renton; 13 March 1931; Denny, Falkirk, Scotland
- Died: 2 June 2016 (aged 85)
- Military career
- Allegiance: United Kingdom
- Branch: Royal Air Force
- Service years: 1954–1986
- Rank: Air commodore
- Service number: 2826287
- Commands: Women's Royal Air Force
- Conflicts: Falklands War

Air Commodore Helen Ferguson Renton, CB, ADC (13 March 1931 – 2 June 2016) was a Scottish Royal Air Force officer. From 1980 to 1986, she served as Director of the Women's Royal Air Force.

== Early life and education ==
Renton was born on 13 March 1931 in Denny, Falkirk, Scotland, to John Paul Renton and Sarah Graham Renton (née Cook). She was educated at Stirling High School, a state high school in Stirling. She studied at the University of Glasgow, graduating with an undergraduate Master of Arts degree (MA Hons). She remained at Glasgow to undertake one year of postgraduate business studies.

== Military career ==
Renton joined the Women's Royal Air Force (WRAF) in 1954, and then underwent two months of officer training. On 9 June 1955, she was commissioned into the Secretarial Branch as a pilot officer. Having completed an accounting course, she was posted as a junior accounts officer to RAF Spitalgate in Grantham, Lincolnshire, England. She was promoted to flying officer on 9 June 1957. She served in the United Kingdom between 1955 and 1960. On 1 April 1960, she was promoted to flight officer with seniority in that rank from 9 March 1960. From 1960 to 1962, she served in Cyprus.

Renton returned to the United Kingdom in 1963. She spent 1967 as a member of the HQ staff of Royal Air Force Germany. On 1 January 1968, she was promoted to squadron officer as part of the half-yearly promotions. From 1968 to 1971, she worked at the Directorate of the WRAF in London. On 1 July 1971, she was promoted to wing commander as part of the half-yearly promotions. She then moved to Cyprus where she served as the most senior WRAF officer at the headquarters of the Near East Air Force. From 1973 to 1976, having returned to the United Kingdom, she was based as RAF Training Command. From 1976 to 1978, she was a staff officer at the Ministry of Defence. On 1 January 1977, she was promoted to group captain as part of the half-yearly promotions.

On 16 February 1980, Renton was appointed Director of the Women's Royal Air Force in succession to Joy Tamblin, and made an acting air commodore. On 1 July 1980, she was promoted to air commodore as part of the half-yearly promotions. She was head of the WRAF during the Falklands War, and although no WRAF personnel were directly involved in the conflict, they played a supporting role from bases in the United Kingdom. She retired on 13 March 1986.

== Personal life ==
Renton never married, nor did she have any children. She believed "children and military life are incompatible".

Renton died on 2 June 2016, she was aged 85.

== Honours ==
On 16 February 1980, Renton was made an Honorary Aide-de-Camp (ADC) to Queen Elizabeth II; she relinquished this appointment on 31 January 1986. In 1981, she was awarded an honorary Doctor of Laws (LLD) degree by the University of Glasgow, her alma mater. In the 1982 New Year Honours, she was appointed a Companion of the Order of the Bath (CB).

Military offices
Preceded by Joy Tamblin	Director of the Women's Royal Air Force; 1980 to 1986	Succeeded by Shirley Jones
