= Anne Stephens (WRAF officer) =

Air Commandant Dame Anne Stephens DBE
- Born: 4 November 1912
- Died: 26 July 2000 (aged 87)
- Allegiance: United Kingdom
- Branch: Royal Air Force
- Commands: Women's Royal Air Force

Air Commandant Dame Anne Stephens DBE (4 November 1912 – 26 July 2000) was Director of the British Women's Royal Air Force from 1960 until her retirement in 1963. She was awarded an MBE in 1946, and elevated to DBE in 1961.

== Family and early life ==
Stephens's father was General Sir Reginald Byng Stephens and she was descended from the brother of Admiral John Byng (1704-1757), who was shot after a court-martial found him guilty in failing to relieve the siege of Minorca during the Seven Years' War.

She was educated privately except for a short period at Hatherop Castle School, and engaged in voluntary work near her home in Gloucestershire until 1939 brought the opportunity to volunteer for service in the Women's Auxiliary Air Force (WAAF).

== Service career ==
Stephens joined the 27th (Gloucester) company of the WAAF when it was formed in 1939, becoming its first commanding officer.

During the Second World War Stephens served in Britain, Belgium, and Germany, and was the second member of the WAAF to cross the channel after D-Day. After the war she continued to serve in the WAAF, which in 1949 became the Women's Royal Air Force (WRAF). In 1950 she took charge of the WRAF training depot at RAF Hawkinge, becoming the first woman to run an RAF station. In 1951 she was promoted to Group Officer; from 1952 to 1954 she was Inspector of the WRAF, and, from 1954 to 1957, its deputy director under Dame Henrietta Barnett.

She spent two years in Germany with the 2nd Tactical Air Force and in 1960 was appointed Director of the WRAF and an Honorary Aide de Camp to Queen Elizabeth II, with the rank of Air Commandant, on Barnett's retirement. She held this post until she retired in 1963, when she was succeeded by Dame Jean Conan Doyle.

== Later life ==
In retirement, Stephens lived in Sibford Ferris, Banbury, Oxfordshire and volunteered with the British Red Cross and other organisations. She died on 26 July 2000, aged 87, unmarried. Her estate was valued at £680,546.
