= Reginald Maxwell (RAF officer) =

British flying ace

Reginald Stuart Maxwell
- Born: 20 July 1894; Willesden, Middlesex, England
- Died: 1 July 1960 (aged 65); Point Piper, New South Wales, Australia
- Military career
- Allegiance: United Kingdom
- Branch: British Army; Royal Air Force; Royal Navy
- Service years: 1915–1945
- Rank: Group Captain
- Nickname: George
- Units: East Yorkshire Regiment; 21st Divisional Cyclist Company; Army Cyclist Corps; No. 25 Squadron RFC; No. 20 Squadron RFC; No. 18 Squadron RFC; No. 54 Squadron RAF; No. 55 Squadron RAF
- Commands: No. 32 Squadron RAF; No. 47 Squadron RAF; No. 70 Squadron RAF; RAF Mildenhall; RAF Dhibban
- Conflicts: World War I • Western Front; World War II
- Awards: Military Cross; Distinguished Flying Cross & Bar; Air Force Cross; Mentioned in Despatches

Group Captain Reginald Stuart Maxwell, MC, DFC & Bar, AFC (20 July 1894 – 1 July 1960) was a British flying ace during World War I. He continued in RAF service until 1941, and served in the Royal Naval Volunteer Reserve during World War II.

== Early life ==
Reginald Stuart Maxwell was born in Willesden to Nellie and John A. Maxwell.

== World War I ==
On 22 September 1914 Maxwell was commissioned as a temporary second lieutenant in the 8th (Service) Battalion, East Yorkshire Regiment, but on 25 January 1915 he was seconded as a lieutenant for service with the 21st Divisional Cyclist Company. On 10 June his unit became part of the Army Cyclist Corps.

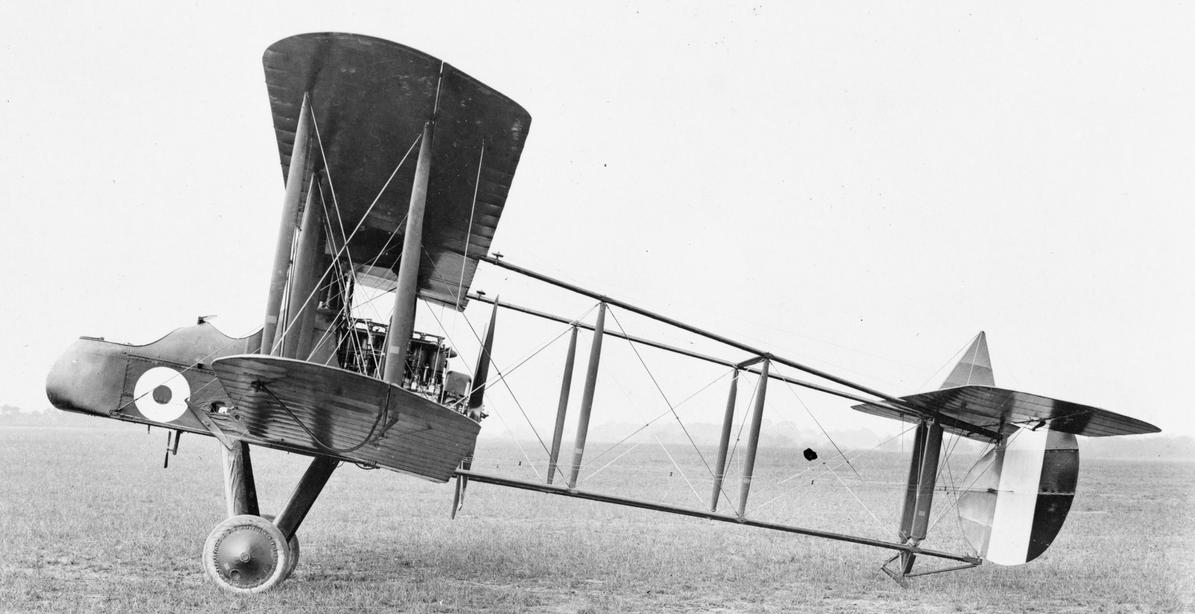
Royal Aircraft Factory FE.2b

Maxwell transferred the Royal Flying Corps. He was granted Royal Aero Club Aviators' Certificate No. 1375 after soloing a Maurice Farman biplane at the Military School at Farnborough Aerodrome on 30 June 1915, and was appointed a flying officer on 11 September. He was then assigned to No. 25 Squadron flying the "pusher" FE.2b.

He scored his first aerial victory on 27 April 1916, forcing a German Aviatik two-seater reconnaissance aircraft to land at Herlies. He then transferred to No. 20 Squadron, and still using a FE.2b, scored three more times; for two of those wins, he had future aces riding as his observers, in Herbert Hamilton and David Stewart. He was also appointed a flight commander, effective 11 May 1916, with a concomitant temporary promotion to captain. On 18 December 1916 Maxwell was appointed a squadron commander with the temporary rank of major, and on 1 January 1917 he was awarded the Military Cross in the New Years Honours.

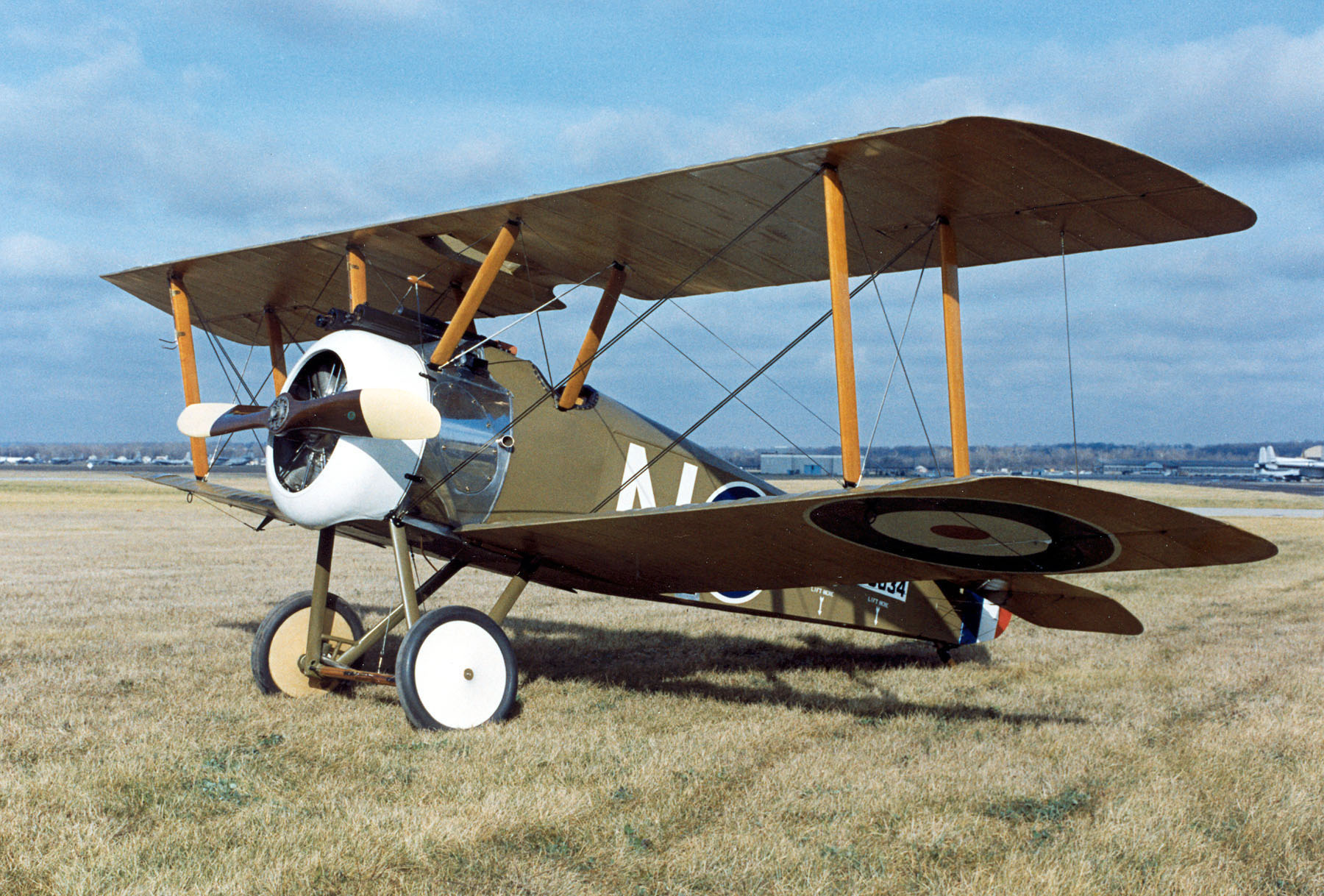
Sopwith F-1 Camel

Maxwell would return to aerial combat when he was assigned to No. 54 Squadron, flying the Sopwith Camel. On 18 January 1918, he used this single-seat fighter aircraft to destroy an Albatros D.V and finally become an ace. He flew a Camel for four more wins scattered throughout 1918, with his ninth and final victory coming just two days before war's end. His final tally for the war was five enemy aircraft destroyed, three driven down out of control, and one forced to land.

== Post World War I service ==
On 1 August 1919 Maxwell was granted a permanent commission in the Royal Air Force with the rank of captain. He served in Iraq during 1920 and 1921, and was promoted from flight lieutenant to squadron leader on 30 June 1921. He returned from a posting with No. 55 Squadron in the Middle East to the RAF Depot (Inland Area) in England as a supernumerary officer on 4 November. From there he was assigned to serve in the Directorate of Training and Organisation in the Air Ministry from 18 February 1922, then in the Directorate of Operations and Intelligence from 15 May 1922.

He then returned to flying, taking command of No. 32 Squadron, based at RAF Kenley, on 1 July 1923, but was reassigned to command No. 24 Squadron, also based at Kenley, on 1 November. During the Fifth RAF Aerial Pageant, held at Hendon Aerodrome on 28 June 1924, Maxwell led the Kenley team to victory in the Relay Race Challenge Cup, piloting a Sopwith Snipe.

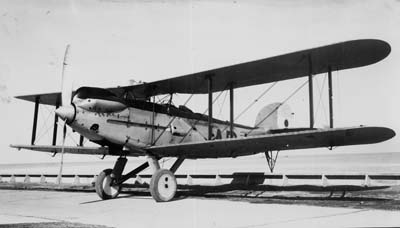
Fairey IIIF

On 22 September 1925 Maxwell took command of No. 47 Squadron, based at RAF Helwan in Egypt. In early 1927 he took part in a flight from Egypt to South Africa, carried out in conjunction with aircraft from the South African Air Force. The four Fairey IIIFs, under the command of Air Commodore Charles Rumney Samson, flew from RAF Heliopolis to Aswan on 30 March, arriving at Khartoum the next day. They then flew via Malakal and Mongalla in Sudan, to Kisumu in Kenya by 4 April, where four South African Airco DH.9s arrived the next day. After air manoeuvres at Nairobi, the combined flight departed on 10 April, flying via Tabora, Tanganyika and Ndola, Northern Rhodesia, to Pretoria by 16 April. The RAF aircraft then flew on alone to Bloemfontein, then to Cape Town by 21 April, completing the outward journey. After five days' rest they flew to Grahamstown for more co-operation flights with the SAAF. They left Pretoria again on 9 May, retracing their route north, and arriving back at Cairo on 22 May, having covered 11,000 miles (18,000 km). On 1 November 1927 he took command of No. 70 Squadron, based in Iraq.

He was promoted to wing commander on 1 January 1930, and returned to the Home Establishment on 2 November 1930, posted to the Depot at RAF Uxbridge. On 7 March 1931 he was assigned to serve at the headquarters of No. 23 (Training) Group at RAF Grantham, pending a posting to the RAF Armament Practice Camp at RAF North Coates Fitties. On 22 October 1931 he was posted back to the headquarters of No. 23 Group for Air Staff duties, remaining there until 6 August 1934.

He was promoted to group captain on 1 January 1936, and on 23 January was appointed station commander of RAF Mildenhall. On 2 February 1938 he returned to Iraq to take command of RAF Dhibban.

Group Captain Maxwell was placed on the retired list of the RAF on 1 April 1941. He joined the Royal Naval Volunteer Reserve as a temporary sub-lieutenant in 1941 to serve in the Fleet Air Arm, and was promoted to lieutenant on 15 January 1942. By 1945 he had risen to the rank of commander.

Maxwell died in Point Piper, New South Wales, Australia, on 1 July 1960.

== Awards and citations ==
- Military Cross (gazetted 1 January 1917).
- Distinguished Flying Cross (gazetted 8 February 1919):

Major Reginald Stuart Maxwell, M.C.

"On 16th November, on a low bombing raid against a railway station, this officer led his whole squadron to within 100 feet over the objective, thus enabling them to drop their bombs with the greatest possible effect on the trains, transport, etc., in the station. After dropping these bombs he led the formation against troops, etc., crowded on a main road, causing great confusion and inflicting heavy casualties. His magnificent example inspires all who serve in his squadron."

- Bar to the Distinguished Flying Cross in lieu of a second award (gazetted on 28 October 1921):

Flight Lieutenant Reginald Stuart Maxwell, M.C., D.F.C.

"For gallantry and devotion to duty. This officer has recently carried out 14 raids over hostile country and 60 hours' flying. He has at all times shown constant courage and a very high, sense of devotion to duty. On one occasion when forced to descend in hostile territory owing to engine failure he displayed great coolness in endeavouring to remedy it under fire, and only when, this was found to be impossible did he take advantage of the landing of another machine, and by lying flat out on its lower plane and was carried away to safety. He has always set a fine example to the rest of his flight by keenness and hard work in the air and on the ground."

- Mentioned in Despatches (gazetted 10 October 1922):

"For services in Iraq in 1920-1921."

- Air Force Cross (gazetted 5 April 1929):

Squadron Leader Reginald Stuart Maxwell

"In recognition of distinguished services rendered...during the recent evacuations from Kabul."

== Personal life ==
His daughter Pamela Ann Maxwell (d. 2003), married Peter Carter-Ruck in 1940. They had a son, who died in a sailing accident in 1973, and a daughter.
