= RAF Hawkinge =

Former Royal Air Force station

RAF Hawkinge
- Near Hawkinge, Kent in England
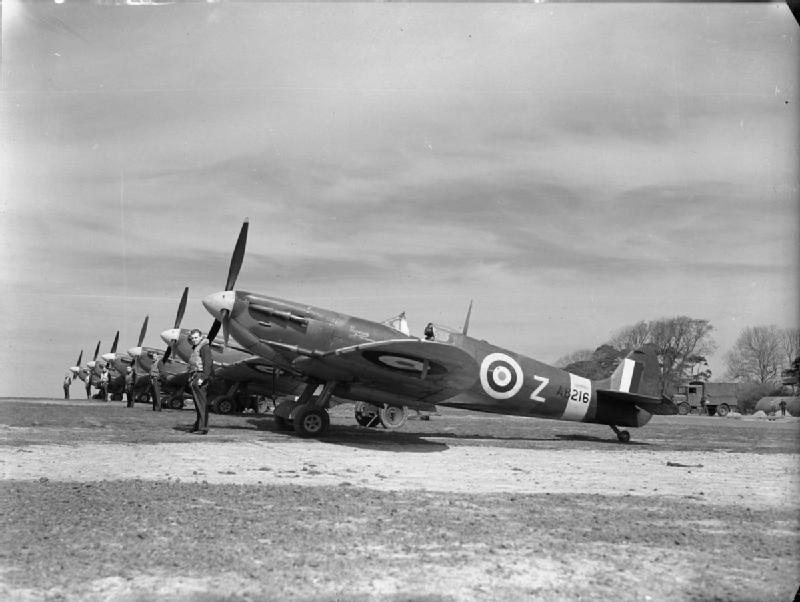
- Spitfire Mk Vs of No. 91 Squadron lined up at Hawkinge during May 1942

Site information
- Type: Royal Air Force station
- Code: VK
- Owner: Air Ministry
- Operator: Royal Flying Corps (1915–1918); Royal Air Force (1918–1962)
- Controlled by: RAF Fighter Command 1940-62; No. 11 Group RAF

Location
- Shown within Kent RAF Hawkinge (the United Kingdom)
- Coordinates: 51°06′45″N 001°09′09″E

Site history
- Built: 1915
- In use: October 1915 - January 1962
- Fate: Site redeveloped for housing estate and museum
- Battles/wars: First World War; European theatre of World War II

Airfield information
- Elevation: 165 metres (541 ft) AMSL
Runways
Direction	Length and surface
00/00	Grass
00/00	Grass
00/00	Grass

Royal Air Force Hawkinge or more simply RAF Hawkinge is a former Royal Air Force station located 13.23 miles (21.29 km) east of Ashford, 2.2 miles (3.5 km) north of Folkestone, Kent and 7.1 miles (11.4 km) west of Dover, Kent, England. The airfield was used by both the Royal Flying Corps and the Royal Air Force during its lifetime and was involved during the Battle of Britain, as well as other important aerial battles during the Second World War and the early stages of aerial usage in war in the First World War.

== History ==
=== First World War ===
During the First World War the airfield was called RFC Folkestone until 29 December 1916 and RFC Hawkinge later on. The only squadron present during this period was No. 25 Squadron RFC between 19 and 20 February 1916 with Vickers F.B.5, Royal Aircraft Factory F.E.2B and Morane-Saulnier L.

An Aircraft Acceptance Park was in residence between 27 July 1917 and 12 October 1917 before being renamed to No. 12 Aircraft Acceptance Park which stayed until May 1919.

=== Inter-war years ===
Between the wars a number of squadrons were posted here:

- 2 Squadron RAF between 30 November 1935 and 29 September 1939 with Hawker Audaxes, Hawker Hectors and Westland Lysander I.
- 17 Squadron RAF reformed here on 1 April 1924 using Sopwith Snipes and Hawker Woodcock II before moving to RAF Upavon on 14 October 1926.
- 25 Squadron RAF reformed here on 26 April 1920 with the Snipe before moving to Turkey on 28 September 1922. However the squadron returned on 3 October 1923 still with the Snipe but added the Gloster Grebe I, Armstrong Whitworth Siskin IIIA, Hawker Fury Mk I and II, Hawker Demon and the Gloster Gladiators before being posted to RAF Northolt on 26 September 1938. 25 Squadron returned again on 12 October 1938 and started using the Bristol Blenheim IF before the squadron returned to Northolt on 22 August 1939.
- 38 Squadron RAF from 14 February 1919 until 4 July 1919 when it was disbanded as a cadre.
- 56 Squadron RAF reformed here on 1 November 1922 with the Snipe before moving to RAF Biggin Hill on 7 May 1923.
- 83 Squadron RAF between 14 February 1919 and September 1919 as a cadre.
- 120 Squadron RAF between 20 February 1919 and 17 July 1919 with the Airco DH.9.

=== Second World War ===
It was from Hawkinge that air liaison was maintained between the Royal Air Force and the British Expeditionary Force during the fighting in France and the Dunkirk evacuation in 1940. As long as communications remained open targets were selected in accordance with requests from the BEF and Hawkinge was one of the advanced re-fuelling bases to provide maximum range for operations over France. It was a fighter airfield for squadrons of No. 11 Group, and was so severely damaged by German bombing and machine gun attacks during the Battle of Britain that it had to be abandoned temporarily.

Hawkinge Cemetery is near the site of the aerodrome and most of the 95 Second World War casualties buried there were airmen. About a quarter were killed during the Battle of Britain. Most of the war graves are in a special plot east of the chapel, including 59 German graves, which are together in a group at the south-eastern corner.

A number of squadrons were posted here:

- 1 Squadron RAF as a detachment between 18 June 1940 and 23 July 1940 with the Hawker Hurricane I.
- 3 Squadron RAF as a detachment between 13 November 1939 and 28 January 1940 with the Hurricane I.
- 16 Squadron RAF between 17 February 1940 and 13 April 1940 with the Lysander II.
- 25 Squadron RAF returned during the Second World War on 10 May 1940 staying for two days still with the Blenheim IF.
- 26 (South African) Squadron RAF between 6 October 1944 and 11 October 1944 with the Hurricane IIC.
- 41 Squadron RAF initially between 30 June 1942 and 8 July 1942 with the Supermarine Spitfire VB then again between 12 April 1943 and 21 May 1943 with the Spitfire XII.
- 65 (East India) Squadron RAF between 30 June 1942 and 7 July 1942 with the Spitfire VB.
- 66 Squadron RAF between 8 October 1942 and 9 October 1942 with the Spitfire VB & VC.
- 79 (Madras Presidency) Squadron RAF between 1 July 1940 and 11 July 1940 with the Hurricane I.
- 91 (Nigeria) Squadron RAF reformed here on 9 January 1941 with the Spitfire IIA & VB versions until 2 October 1942, however the squadron returned 9 October 1942 this time staying until 23 November 1942. 91 Squadron returned again on 11 January 1943 still with the Spitfire and stayed until 11 January 1943. The squadron returned for the last time on 21 May 1943 with the Spitfire XII and stayed until 28 June 1943 when the squadron moved to RAF Westhampnett.
- 124 (Baroda) Squadron RAF between 7 April 1945 and 10 April 1945 with the Spitfire HF IXE.
- 132 (City of Bombay) Squadron RAF between 29 September 1944 and 14 December 1944 with the Spitfire IXB.
- 245 (Northern Rhodesian) Squadron RAF as a detachment between 12 May 1940 and 20 July 1940 with the Hurricane I.
- 277 Squadron RAF as a detachment between 7 December 1942 and February 1943 with the Lysander III, Supermarine Walrus and the Boulton Paul Defiant I. A detachment returned on 15 April 1944 with Supermarine Sea Otter before leaving during April 1944. The squadron returned on 5 October 1944 with the Sea Otter, Spitfire VB and the Vickers Warwick I before disbanded on 15 February 1945.
- 278 Squadron RAF as a detachment from 15 February 1945 with the Spitfire VB and the Sea Otter during October 1945 when the squadron was disbanded.
- 313 (Czechoslovak) Squadron RAF between 21 August 1943 and 18 September 1943 with the Spitfire VB.
- 322 (Dutch) Squadron RAF between 31 December 1943 and 25 February 1944 with the Spitfire VB & VC. The squadron returned with the same aircraft on 1 March 1944 and stayed until 10 March 1944.
- 350 (Belgian) Squadron RAF initially between 1 October 1943 and 12 October 1943 with the Spitfire VB. 350 Squadron then returned on 31 October 1943 with Spitfire VC and stayed until 30 December 1943. The squadron again on 10 March 1944 with Spitfire IXB and stayed until 14 March 1944. The squadron returned for the last time on 8 August 1944 with Spitfire XIV and stayed until 29 September 1944.
- 402 Squadron RCAF between 8 August 1944 and 30 September 1944 with Spitfire IX & XIVE.
- 416 Squadron RCAF between 14 August 1942 and 20 August 1942 with Spitfire VB.
- 441 Squadron RCAF initially between 1 October 1944 and 30 December 1944 with Spitfire VB & IXB. The squadron returned on 3 April 1945 with Spitfire IX. It left on 29 April 1945.
- 451 Squadron RAAF between 2 December 1944 and 11 February 1945 with Spitfire IXB & XVI. The squadron returned on 3 May 1945 with Spitfire XVI staying until 17 May 1945.
- 453 Squadron RAAF between 2 May 1945 and 17 May 1945 with Spitfire LF XVI.
- 501 (County of Gloucester) Squadron AAF between 8 and 10 October 1942 with Spitfire VB & VC. The squadron returned on 21 June 1943 with Spitfire VB & IX before leaving on 21 January 1944 to RAF Southend.
- 504 (County of Nottingham) Squadron AAF between 28 February 1945 and 28 March 1945 with Spitfire IXE.
- 567 Squadron RAF initially as a detachment between 14 November 1944 and 1945 with Miles Martinet, Hawker Hurricane IV and Airspeed Oxford. The squadron returned on 13 June 1945 with full squadron strength and replaced the Martinets with the Spitfire XVI. 567 Squadron left on 21 August 1945 going to RAF Manston.
- 605 (County of Warwick) Squadron AAF between 21 May 1940 between 28 May 1940 with Hurricane I.
- 611 (West Lancashire) Squadron AAF between 31 December 1944 and 3 March 1945 with Spitfire VII and IX.
- 613 (City of Manchester) Squadron AAF as a detachment between November 1939 and April 1940 with Hinds and Hectors.
- 616 (South Yorkshire) Squadron RAF between 14 August 1942 and 20 August 1942 with Spitfire VI.

=== Post war ===
After the war, the station hosted the Home Command Gliding Centre RAF (part of RAF Home Command), where many Air Cadets first learned to fly in Slingsby Mk III and Slingsby Sedbergh TX Mk.1 gliders.

- 122 (Bombay) Squadron RAF between 24 September 1945 and 19 October 1945 with the Spitfire IX.
- 234 (Madras Presidency) Squadron RAF between 27 August 1945 and 21 September with the North American Mustang IV.
- 658 Squadron RAF between 2 and 6 July 1945 with Auster V.

RAF Hawkinge became a Woman's Officer Cadet Training Unit between June 1960 and January 1962, under the command of Group Officer Jean Conan Doyle, the daughter of Sir Arthur Conan Doyle.

The Home Command Gliding Centre was ancillary to the training unit, the reason being that the grass airfield made it ideal for ATC Cadets to learn to fly sail planes.

== Units ==
The following units were here at some point:

- No. 1 Aircraft Delivery Flight RAF (September 1945)
- Detachment from No. 1 Coast Artillery Co-operation Flight (August 1941)
- No. 3 Armament Practice Station RAF (August - November 1945)
- No. 6 Fighter Command Servicing Unit (February 1945 - February 1946)
- No. 12 Aircraft Acceptance Park (August 1917 - May 1919)
- No. 157 (General Reconnaissance) Wing RAF (May - August 1944)
- No. 166 Gliding School RAF (December 1945 - September 1955)
- No. 416 (Army Co-operation) Flight RAF (March 1940)
- No. 421 (Reconnaissance) Flight RAF (November 1940 - January 1941)
- 854 Naval Air Squadron
- 855 Naval Air Squadron
- No. 3201 Servicing Commando
- No. 3203 Servicing Commando
- No. 3210 Servicing Commando
- Air Sea Rescue Flight RAF, Hawkinge (July - December 1941) became 'B' Flight, No. 277 Squadron RAF
- 'D' (Army Co-operation) Flight RAF (April 1940)
- Home Command Gliding Centre RAF (December 1955 - June 1958) became No. 1 Home Command Gliding Centre RAF (June 1958 - March 1959) became No. 1 Gliding Centre RAF (March 1959 - December 1961)
- Pilotless Aircraft Section RAF (February 1940)
- WRAF Depot (July 1947 - June 1960)

RAF Regiment

- No. 1334 Wing RAF Regiment
- No. 2707 Squadron RAF Regiment
- No. 2709 Squadron RAF Regiment
- No. 2733 Squadron RAF Regiment
- No. 2767 Squadron RAF Regiment
- No. 2799 Squadron RAF Regiment
- No. 2813 Squadron RAF Regiment
- No. 2826 Squadron RAF Regiment
- No. 2828 Squadron RAF Regiment
- No. 2847 Squadron RAF Regiment
- No. 2886 Squadron RAF Regiment
- No. 2955 Squadron RAF Regiment

== Station commanders ==
- Anne Stephens (1950 to 1952)
- Henrietta Barnett (1952 to 1956)
- Jean Conan Doyle (1956 to 1959)
- Felicity Hill (1959 to 1960)

== Current use ==
The site has been largely built over and is now occupied by the Kent Battle of Britain Museum and a housing estate. The remains of the strip are referred to by locals as "the rough grounds".

== See also ==
- Battle of Britain
- List of Battle of Britain airfields
- List of Battle of Britain squadrons
- List of former Royal Air Force stations
