= Guy Borthwick Moore =

Canadian WWI flying ace (1895–1918)

- Born: 28 May 1895; Mattawa, Ontario, Canada
- Died: 7 April 1918 (aged 22); Hollebeke
- Burial place: Pas de Calais, France
- Military career
- Allegiance: George V of the British Empire
- Branch: Royal Flying Corps
- Service years: 1916 - 1918
- Rank: Captain
- Unit: No. 1 Squadron RFC/No. 1 Squadron RAF
- Awards: Military Cross

Captain Guy Borthwick Moore (1895–1918) was a Canadian World War I flying ace credited with ten aerial victories.

== Biography ==
Moore lived in Vancouver and attended the University of British Columbia from 1913 to 1916, gaining a BA. He was an oarsman and a rugby player. He became a lieutenant in the Irish Fusiliers of Canada in 1916, and a cadet in the Royal Flying Corps (RFC) as of December 1916. He voyaged to England the following month. He was commissioned a second lieutenant in the RFC on 26 April 1917, and appointed a flying officer on 8 June 1917. He finished his pilot's training in August 1917.

Moore joined No. 1 Squadron RFC on 16 August 1917 as a Nieuport fighter pilot. He scored his first victory on 2 October, sharing it with fellow ace Herbert Hamilton. Moore scored twice more with a Nieuport, on 17 December 1917 and 4 January 1918; then he upgraded to a Royal Aircraft Factory SE.5a. He was also promoted to flight commander. He used his new mount to cooperate in the destruction of a German Pfalz D.III on 13 March, sharing the win with Hamilton, Harry Rigby, Percy Jack Clayson, and four other pilots. On 28 March, Moore notched a double victory, sharing one of the wins with Francis Magoun. A summary of Moore's record shows six enemy airplanes destroyed (two of which were shared wins), and four driven down out of control (one of which was shared).

Moore was killed on 7 April 1918, when a German anti-aircraft shell blew up his airplane. He was awarded a posthumous Military Cross.

== Honors and awards ==
Military Cross (MC)

T./Capt. Guy Borthwick Moore, Gen. List and R.F.C.

For conspicuous gallantry and devotion to duty. He led a patrol to attack hostile balloons. The patrol drove down three balloons in a collapsed condition, one of which he accounted for himself. He has also destroyed three enemy aeroplanes and driven down three others out of control. He has always shown splendid courage and resource. (Supplement to the London Gazette, 13 May 1918)
