= Henrietta Barnett (WRAF officer) =

Dame Henrietta Barnett
- Air Commandant Barnett in 1958
- Born: Mary Henrietta Barnett; 16 February 1905; Winchester, Hampshire, England
- Died: 11 September 1985 (aged 80); Oxfordshire, England
- Military career
- Allegiance: United Kingdom
- Branch: Auxiliary Territorial Service (1938–1939); Women's Auxiliary Air Force (1939–1949); Women's Royal Air Force (1949–1960)
- Service years: 1938–1960
- Rank: Air Commandant
- Conflicts: Second World War; Cold War

Air Commandant Dame Mary Henrietta Barnett DBE (16 February 1905 – 11 September 1985) was a senior officer of the Women's Royal Air Force (WRAF). From 1956 to 1960, she served as its director.

== Early life and education ==
Barnett was born on 16 February 1905 in Winchester, Hampshire, England. She was the youngest child of Colonel George Henry Barnett CMG DSO and Mary Dorothea Barnett (née Baker). From September 1918 to July 1922, she was educated at Heathfield School, an all girls independent school in Ascot, Berkshire.

== Military career ==
In 1938, Barnett joined the Auxiliary Territorial Service as a volunteer (IE private), and was assigned to No. 45 County of Oxford Company. She transferred to the Women's Auxiliary Air Force (WAAF) when it was established on 28 June 1939. She was commissioned into the WAAF as a company assistant (equivalent to a pilot officer in the Royal Air Force), with seniority from 5 December 1938. During World War II, she served at RAF Upper Heyford in Oxfordshire, at RAF Feltwell in Norfolk, and at the Air Ministry in London.

Barnett was present for the London Blitz and witnessed the destruction of the House of Commons as well as other places. At that time, she was stationed there and air women like herself worked on various tasks at the Air Ministry. Barnett states "Never once did they speak of their secret work, seldom were they late for duty, even after a raid. They were known as the Whitehall Warriors."

After the end of the war, in the summer of 1945, Barnett was posted to RAF Mediterranean Command in Caserta, Italy. There, she served as the "staff officer responsible for all WAAF personnel working in the RAF Mediterranean and Middle East command". She traveled to Vienna to seek out the possibility of stationing air women there. In October 1947, she returned to the United Kingdom and was appointed as an WAAF staff officer at Flying Training Command headquarters. On 13 November 1947, she was appointed to an extended service commission as a flight officer (equivalent to flight lieutenant) with seniority in that rank from 3 March 1943. In October 1948, she appointed the WAAF Inspector; this job required her to travel extensively, inspecting all the bases within RAF Home Command that had WAAF personnel.

In 1949, the Women's Royal Air Force (WRAF) was created. On 1 February 1949, Barnett was made a group officer (equivalent in rank to a group captain in the RAF) in the Secretary Branch of the WRAF. From 1949 to 1952, she served as one of two Deputy-Directors of the WRAF: in that role, she had responsibility for the "selection, promotion, and career and personal problems of WRAF officers". On 1 November 1952, she was appointed commanding officer of RAF Hawkinge; as such, she became the only female station commander in the RAF. From 1 August 1956 to March 1960, she served as director of the Women's Royal Air Force, holding the rank of air commandant (equivalent to air commodore). During this time, she was also an aide-de-camp to the Queen.

== Later life ==
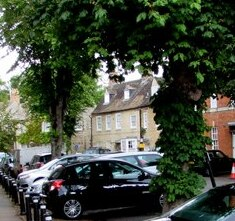
Barnett's home in Woodstock

In March 1960, Barnett retired from the WRAF, and moved to a cottage in Woodstock, Oxfordshire. She maintained her links with the WRAF and served as chair of the executive committee of the WRAF Officers' Association. She was also active in local affairs and served as mayor of Woodstock from 1968 to 1969.

Barnett died of a heart attack at her home on 11 September 1985, she was aged 80.

== Honours ==
In the 1956 New Year Honours, Barnett was appointed a Commander of the Order of the British Empire (CBE). In the 1958 Queen's Birthday Honours, she was promoted to Dame Commander of the Order of the British Empire (DBE), and therefore granted the title Dame.

Military offices
Preceded by Nancy Salmon	Director of the Women's Royal Air Force; 1956 to 1960	Succeeded by Anne Stephens
