= Shirley Jones (WRAF officer) =

Air Commodore Shirley Ann Jones CBE ADC was director of the Women's Royal Air Force (WRAF) from 31 January 1986 to 1989.

Military offices
Preceded by Helen Renton	Director of the Women's Royal Air Force; 1986 to 1989	Succeeded by Ruth Montague
