= Harry Rigby (aviator) =

Australian World War I flying ace

Harry Alexander Rigby
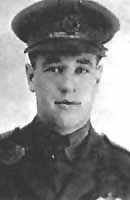
- Born: 2 November 1896; Melbourne, Australia
- Died: 4 November 1972 (aged 76)
- Burial place: Camberwell, Victoria
- Military career
- Allegiance: Australia
- Branch: Aviation
- Service years: 1916–1918
- Rank: Captain
- Units: No. 40 Squadron RFC, No. 1 Squadron RAF
- Awards: Military Cross

Captain Harry Alexander Rigby (2 November 1896 – 4 November 1972) was a World War I flying ace credited with six aerial victories.

Rigby was commissioned in the Royal Flying Corps on 22 May 1916. He joined 40 Squadron on 1 August, but left a month later due to illness. Subsequently, he joined 1 Squadron on 2 February 1918, being promoted to captain shortly thereafter. Piloting a Royal Aircraft Factory S.E.5A, he scored his first victory on 13 March 1918, sharing it with fellow aces Percy Jack Clayson, Herbert Hamilton, William Patrick, Guy Borthwick Moore, and four other pilots. In the next two months, Rigby would singlehandedly rack up five more triumphs, the last being 11 May 1918. His final tally was one Albatros D.V set afire, two enemy planes destroyed, and three enemy fighters sent down out of control. On 17 May, illness once again removed Rigby from duty.

== Honors and awards ==
Military Cross (MC)

Lt. Harry Alexander Rigby, R.F.C., Spec. Res.

Rigby was awarded the Military Cross, gazetted on 21 June 1918. The citation read:

Lt. Harry Alexander Rigby, R.F.C., Spec. Res.
For conspicuous gallantry and devotion to duty. He has carried out many low-flying bombing raids, obtaining direct hits on enemy troops, hutments and camps. On one occasion, after attacking a large column of enemy infantry on a road with machine-gun fire, he attacked and shot down in flames a hostile scout. His work has always been carried out with the utmost keenness and determination.
