= Joy Tamblin =

British air force officer

Air Commodore Pamela Joy Tamblin CB (11 January 1926 – 8 March 2015) was a senior officer of the Royal Air Force. She served as Director of the Women's Royal Air Force from 1976 to 1980.

== Military career ==
During World War II, Tamblin served in the Auxiliary Territorial Service. She worked at Bletchley Park between 1943 and 1945.

She joined the Women's Royal Air Force in 1951. She served in the Education Branch from 1951 to 1955, and the Administrative Branch from 1955 to 1976. She was station commander of RAF Spitalgate from 1971 to 1974. She served as Director of the Women's Royal Air Force from 1976 to 1980, succeeding Molly Allott.

Tamblin decided to study at Durham University, resulting in a Secondary Honours Degree in “Geography and Economics”. This decision was taken after Tamblin was “discharged at the rank of Corporal”. Shortly afterwards, Tamblin managed an education centre and then went on to the administrative branch in 1955, resulting in “personnel and general management”. In 1951, she joined the RAF and began her 12-week training to become an officer. Tamblin developed her skills as an “interviewer, projectionist and public speaker and adding to this also learned how to manage accounts”. Tamblin had many different responsibilities, which is still a rare situation for a woman to be in, even today. "Moving event at RAF memorial Museum as late air commodore's artefacts are unveiled". The Post. Cornish and Devon Post. Archived from the original on 20 February 2020.

== Honours ==
In the 1980 Birthday Honours, Tamblin was appointed Companion of the Order of the Bath (CB).

== Death ==
Joy Tamblin died on 8 March 2015 in Cornwall, aged 89, having been predeceased by her husband, Douglas.

Military offices
Preceded by Molly Allott	Director of the Women's Royal Air Force; 1976 to 1980	Succeeded by Helen Renton
