= 51st (Highland) Searchlight Regiment, Royal Artillery =

51st (Highland) Searchlight Regiment, RA 124th (Highland) Light AA Regiment, RA
- Royal Artillery cap badge (pre-1953)
- Active: 1 November 1938–10 March 1955
- Country: United Kingdom
- Branch: Territorial Army
- Type: Searchlight Regiment; Light Anti-Aircraft Regiment
- Role: Air Defence
- Part of: 3rd AA Division; 7th AA Division; 75th AA Brigade; 76th AA Brigade
- Garrison/HQ: Dundee
- Engagements: The Blitz; Normandy; North West Europe

The 51st (Highland) Searchlight Regiment, Royal Artillery was a Scottish unit of Britain's Territorial Army (TA) formed for air defence just before World War II. It later served as an anti-aircraft (AA) artillery unit in the North West Europe Campaign 1944–45, and continued in the postwar TA into the 1950s.

== Origin ==
The unit's origin lay in two independent AA Companies of the Royal Engineers (RE) formed in Aberdeen and Dundee in 1935 and equipped with searchlights. During the expansion of TA air defence units after the Munich Crisis, the two were combined on 1 November 1938 into a new 51st (Highland) AA Battalion, RE and a third company raised, giving the battalion the following organisation:

- HQ Company at Drill Hall, Bell St, Dundee
- 319 (City of Aberdeen) AA Company, Fonthill Barracks, Aberdeen
- 320 (City of Dundee) AA Company, Drill Hall, Bell St, Dundee
- 404 AA Company, Cowdenbeath

Major W.C.G. Black, MC, TD, officer commanding 20th (Fife & Forfar Yeomanry) Armoured Car Company, was promoted to lieutenant-colonel to command the new battalion on 12 October 1938.

In February 1939 the TA's AA units came under the control of a new Anti-Aircraft Command.

== World War II ==
=== Mobilisation ===
In June 1939 a partial mobilisation of TA units was begun in a process known as 'couverture', whereby each AA unit did a month's tour of duty in rotation to man selected AA and searchlight positions. On 24 August, ahead of the declaration of war, AA Command was fully mobilised at its war stations. Shortly after mobilisation, 51st AA Bn was assigned to 52nd Light Anti-Aircraft Brigade, a new formation being organised at Stirling with responsibility for searchlight provision within 3rd AA Division covering Scotland.

In February 1940, the battalion provided a cadre of experienced officers and men to help form a new 474 S/L Bty in 5th AA Division.

=== 51st S/L Regiment ===
On 1 August 1940 the RE searchlight battalions were transferred to the Royal Artillery (RA), and the unit was redesignated 51st (Highland) Searchlight Regiment, RA (TA). It remained with 52 AA Bde in 3 AA Division throughout the Battle of Britain and The Blitz (when Clydebank was badly hit).

547 Searchlight Bty joined on 23 January 1941, having been formed at 232nd S/L Training Rgt at Devizes on 16 January (with a cadre provided by 40th (Sherwood Foresters) S/L Rgt) and spent just a few days under command of 54th (Durham Light Infantry) S/L Rgt. 51st (Highland) S/L Rgt in turn sent a cadre to 234th S/L Training Rgt at Carlisle, where they were to form a new 564 S/L Bty on 17 April 1941, but this was cancelled.

=== 124th LAA Regiment ===
==== Home Defence ====
On 14 February 1942, the regiment was converted to the Light Anti-Aircraft (LAA) artillery role as 124 (Highland) Light Anti-Aircraft Regiment, RA (TA); 319, 320, 404 and 547 S/L Btys became 411, 412, 404 and 413 LAA Btys respectively. The inexperienced 413 LAA Bty (ex-547 S/L Bty) was sent to 237th LAA Training Rgt at Holywood in Northern Ireland.

During May 1942, 124th LAA Rgt completed its re-equipment and training, and joined 30th (Northumbrian) AA Bde, covering Tyneside and Sunderland in 7th AA Division. 413 LAA Battery, for example, was sent to Seaham Holiday Camp, from where it took over operational sites in the Sunderland area and established its Battery HQ at Whitburn Hall, Whitburn. However, in September 1942, 413 LAA Bty left 124th LAA Rgt to join 143rd LAA Rgt in Essex (formally transferring on 3 October), while the rest of the regiment moved to 47th AA Bde at Southampton.

By March 1943, the regiment had moved again, to 5 AA Bde in the Gloucester area, but had left AA Command by August 1943 and joined Second Army forming in England for Operation Overlord.

==== North West Europe ====
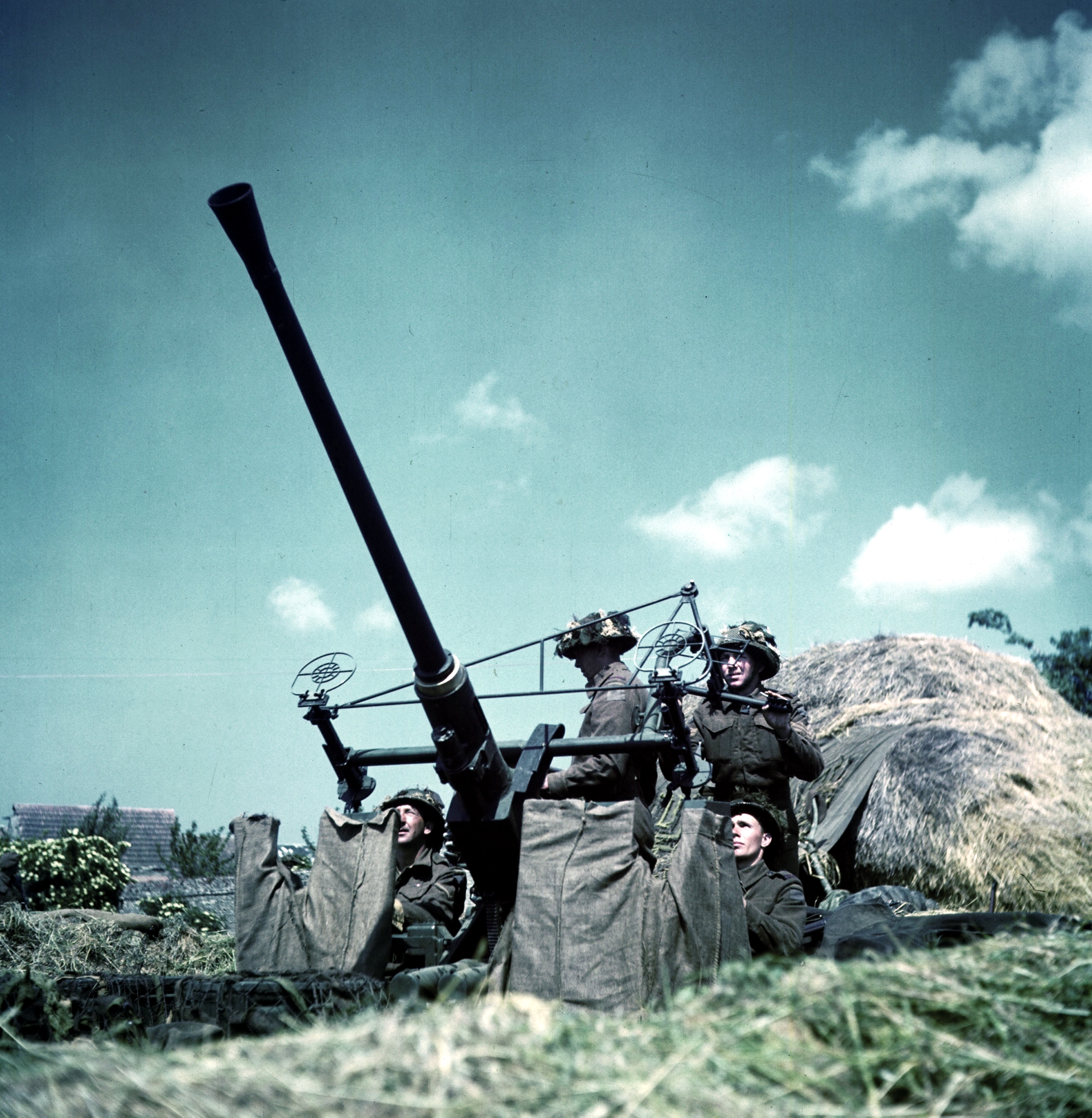
Bofors 40 mm LAA gun equipped with 'Stiffkey Stick' sights

LAA regiments at this time comprised three batteries of three troops, each equipped with six towed Bofors 40 mm guns using 'Stiffkey Stick' sights. As a mobile unit, 124th LAA would also have had a Royal Electrical And Mechanical Engineers (REME) workshop and a detachment of the Royal Corps of Signals.

124 LAA Regiment went to Normandy in late August 1944 as part of 75th Anti-Aircraft Brigade, which immediately took over AA defence for the Caen area, including the Caen Canal and River Orne bridges. Two weeks later, Canadian troops captured Ostend, and 124 LAA Rgt with the rest of 75 AA Bde moved up the coast to defend it. In November it moved again, to guard the Scheldt estuary, and when the war ended the bulk of 124 LAA Rgt was on the south bank of the Scheldt under 75 AA Bde, with 411 Bty detached to the north bank under 76th AA Bde.

On 9 January 1945, four Bofors of 411 LAA Bty hit and sank a German Biber midget submarine operating off South Beveland. The regiment also manned the Bofors guns on two Landing Craft Flak operating in the estuary under with searchlights provided by 1st S/L Rgt. The battery remained with 76 AA Bde in the final weeks of the war.

After VE Day, the whole of 124 LAA Rgt came under command of 76 AA Bde as it moved into Germany to garrison the Dortmund–Bochum area under I Corps. After 76 AA Bde completed its disbandment in the first two weeks of April 1946, 124 LAA Rgt stayed on as part of British Army of the Rhine, but was placed in suspended animation on 8 June.

== Postwar ==
When the TA was reconstituted on 1 January 1947, the regiment was reformed as 586 (Highland) LAA Regiment, RA, with HQ at Dundee and forming part of 78th AA Bde (the former 52 AA Bde) based in Perth.

In March 1949, the regiment was redesignated again, as 586 (Highland) LAA/Searchlight Regiment, RA.

When Anti-Aircraft Command was disbanded in March 1955, 586 Rgt was absorbed into 276th (Highland) Field Regiment, RA.

== Honorary Colonel ==
Honorary Capt C.A. Carlow, a retired Volunteer officer, was appointed Honorary Colonel of the battalion on 12 October 1938.

== Insignia ==
124 LAA Regiment wore a regimental shoulder flash consisting of a Scottish saltire in the RE colours of blue on red.

== Online sources ==
- British Army units from 1945 on
- British Military History
- Orders of Battle at Patriot Files
- The Royal Artillery 1939–45
- Graham Watson, The Territorial Army 1947
