= Felicity Hill =

British military personnel (1915–2019)

Dame Felicity Hill DBE
- Born: Felicity Barbara Hill; 12 December 1915
- Died: 30 January 2019 (aged 103)
- Allegiance: United Kingdom
- Branch: Women's Auxiliary Air Force; Royal Air Force
- Service years: 1939–1969
- Rank: Air Commodore
- Commands: Women's Royal Air Force

Air Commodore Dame Felicity Barbara Hill, DBE (12 December 1915 – 30 January 2019) was a British Royal Air Force officer. From 1966 to 1969, she served as Director of the Women's Royal Air Force. She died in January 2019 at the age of 103.

== Military career ==
In 1939, with the outbreak of World War II, Hill joined the Women's Auxiliary Air Force (WAAF). She had intended to join the Women's Royal Naval Service (WRENS) but her application had taken too long to process, so she joined the WAAF alongside some friends. She was in fact too short to qualify for military service but the man measuring her added half an inch to her height to meet the minimum required. Describing the situation, she stated "I probably should never have got in". Her first posting as an aircraftwoman was as an equipment assistant at stores of RAF Farnborough where she issued "anything from pants to revolvers".

She failed her first officer selection board because she was too young. Having attended the WAAF's first NCO training course in June 1940, she was promoted to corporal. She then served as a new entrant instructor at RAF West Drayton, and then in Harrogate when the training school moved there due to the London Blitz.

Having passed the officer board on her second attempt, Hill attended the WAAF's Officer Training School in Bulstrode Park, Buckingham. On 18 December 1940, she was commissioned as an assistant section officer (equivalent in rank to a pilot officer). In 1941, she served at RAF Wyton where her duties included interviewing applicants to the WAAF; among those she interviewed was Sarah Churchill, a daughter of then-Prime Minister Winston Churchill.

From 1942 to 1943, she served at the WAAF Directorate. On 1 February 1942, she was promoted to (temporary) section officer (equivalent in rank to a flying officer). Promoted to temporary flight officer (equivalent to flight lieutenant) on 1 January 1943, she was subsequently based in Scotland at RAF Kirkwell in 1943, and at RAF Turnhouse from 1943 to 1944. She served as commander of the WRAF Depot at RAF Grantham. In March 2023, she was one of a number of notable women with a connection to Grantham honoured by South Kesteven District Council.

Military offices
Preceded by Dame Jean Conan Doyle	Director of the Women's Royal Air Force; 1966 to 1969	Succeeded by Philippa Marshall
