= David Stewart (RAF officer) =

British First World War flying ace

David Arthur Stewart
- Born: 8 March 1890; Hull, Yorkshire, England
- Died: 24 December 1924 (aged 34); Purley, Surrey, England
- Military career
- Allegiance: United Kingdom
- Branch: British Army; Royal Air Force
- Service years: c.1916–1924
- Rank: Flight lieutenant
- Units: No. 20 Squadron RFC; No. 18 Squadron RFC/RAF; No. 216 Squadron RAF; No. 7 Squadron RAF
- Conflicts: World War I • Western Front
- Awards: Military Cross & Bar; Distinguished Flying Cross; Air Force Cross
- Other work: Commercial pilot for Imperial Airways

Flight Lieutenant David Arthur Stewart, MC*, DFC, AFC (8 March 1890 – 24 December 1924) was a British First World War flying ace credited with sixteen aerial victories. Remarkably, they were all scored while he was flying bombers instead of fighters.

== World War I service ==
Stewart served in the Royal Flying Corps, and gained his first two victories over German fighters on 1 and 3 August 1916 while flying with No. 20 Squadron RFC as an Air Mechanic 2nd Class observer in the front seat of a F.E.2b. He then trained as a pilot, and Corporal Stewart was awarded Royal Aero Club Aviator's Certificate No. 3958 after soloing a Maurice Farman biplane at the Military School at Brooklands on 7 December 1916. He completed his flying training, and on 29 May 1917 Sergeant Stewart was commissioned as a temporary second lieutenant, and appointed a flying officer.

His first victory as a pilot came on 6 January 1918 while flying an Airco DH.4 for No. 18 Squadron RFC. On 6 March 1918, he destroyed a Pfalz D.III and drove three other German fighters down out of control. He continued to score steadily until 27 March, when he achieved his eleventh victory. On 1 April 1918, the Army's Royal Flying Corps and the Royal Naval Air Service were merged to form the Royal Air Force, and his unit became No. 18 Squadron RAF.

On 22 April 1918 Stewart was awarded the Military Cross. His citation read:

Temporary Second Lieutenant David Arthur Stewart, General List and Royal Flying Corps.

"For conspicuous gallantry and devotion to duty. On one occasion, when returning from bombing an enemy dump, he was intercepted by a formation of thirty hostile machines. He attacked the leader and shot his machine down out of control, whilst his observer shot down another enemy scout. He then fired a burst at another large scout, which dived down vertically out of control. On his observer being hit whilst engaged with another four machines, he spun down 4,000 feet and dived for our lines. Later, when on photographic duty, he was attacked by five enemy scouts, three of which were accounted for by his observer and himself. In the face of heavy odds, his courage, skill and fine fighting spirit have been most conspicuous."

On 25 March 1918 Stewart was appointed a flight commander with the temporary rank of captain.

He went on to gain another victory on 28 May, and scored double victories on 30 May and 11 June 1918. Fifteen of his triumphs were over enemy fighters; he destroyed eight and drove seven down out of control. He also destroyed an enemy two-seater. Among his observer gunners were fellow aces Lewis Collins and William Miller.

On 22 June he was awarded a Bar to his Military Cross, his citation reading:

Temporary Second Lieutenant (Temporary Captain) David Arthur Stewart, MC, General List and Royal Flying Corps.

"For conspicuous gallantry and devotion to duty. During the past month, when engaged with superior numbers of enemy aircraft, he has destroyed four hostile machines, all of which were seen to crash by other observers. He has in addition carried out nine successful reconnaissances, as a result of which he has returned with information of the greatest value. He has displayed the greatest courage and determination at all times on his many low flying and bombing attacks on hostile troops and transport."

On 1 November 1918 he was awarded the Distinguished Flying Cross.

Lieutenant (Temporary Captain) David Arthur Stewart, MC, Royal Air Force

"An able leader, conspicuous for initiative and dash. He has destroyed three enemy machines, and has, in addition, taken part in numerous bombing raids, reconnaissances and photographic flights. In the majority of these he has been leader, and frequently in order to obtain accurate information he has led his flight at very low altitudes."

=== List of aerial victories ===
Combat record
No.	Date/Time	Aircraft/ Serial No.	Opponent	Result	Location	Notes
No. 20 Squadron RFC
1	1 August 1916 @ 1600	F.E.2b (A13)	Fokker E.III	Destroyed	Moorslede	Pilot: Lieutenant D. H. Dabbs
2	3 August 1916 @ 1010	F.E.2b (A23)	Scout	Destroyed	Ypres	Pilot: Captain Reginald Maxwell
No. 18 Squadron RFC
3	6 January 1918 @ 1205	D.H.4 (A7653)	Albatros D.V	Out of control	Valenciennes	Observer: Second Lieutenant Harry Mackay
4	6 March 1918 @ 1115	D.H.4 (A7797)	Pfalz D.III	Destroyed	Pont-à-Vendin	Observer: Second Lieutenant Harry Mackay
5	6 March 1918 @ 1115	D.H.4 (A7797)	Pfalz D.III	Out of control	Pont-à-Vendin	Observer: Second Lieutenant Harry Mackay
6	6 March 1918 @ 1115	D.H.4 (A7797)	Albatros D.V	Out of control	Pont-à-Vendin	Observer: Second Lieutenant Harry Mackay
7	6 March 1918 @ 1115	D.H.4 (A7797)	Albatros D.V	Out of control	Pont-à-Vendin	Observer: Second Lieutenant Harry Mackay
8	10 March 1918 @ 1245	D.H.4 (A7799)	Pfalz D.III	Out of control	Carvin	Observer: Sergeant C. Beardmore
9	15 March 1918 @ 1255	D.H.4 (A8038)	Pfalz D.III	Destroyed	Avelin	Observer: Sergeant A. Pollard
10	25 March 1918 @ 1715	D.H.4 (A8038)	Two-seater	Destroyed	Loupart Wood	Observer: Captain Lewis Collins
11	27 March 1918 @ 1130	D.H.4 (A7800)	Fokker Dr.I	Destroyed	South-west of Albert	Observer: Captain Lewis Collins
No. 18 Squadron RAF
12	28 May 1918 @ 1140	D.H.4 (A8038)	Albatros D.V	Destroyed	West of Douai	Observer: Captain Lewis Collins
13	30 May 1918 @ 1300–1305	D.H.4 (A8038)	Pfalz D.III	Destroyed	Neuve-Chapelle	Observer: Lieutenant William Miller
14	30 May 1918 @ 1300–1305	D.H.4 (A8038)	Pfalz D.III	Out of control	Richebourg	Observer: Lieutenant William Miller
15	17 June 1918 @ 0845–0850	D.H.4	Pfalz D.III	Destroyed	Hulluch	Observer: Captain Lewis Collins
16	17 June 1918 @ 0845–0850	D.H.4	Pfalz D.III	Out of control	Loos	Observer: Captain Lewis Collins

== Post-war career ==
Stewart remained in the RAF post-war, being granted a short service commission as a flying officer on 24 October 1919. He served in RAF Middle East, being promoted to flight lieutenant on 30 June 1921, and a few days later, on 5 July 1921, was transferred from the Aircraft Depot, Egypt, to No. 216 Squadron, based at RAF Heliopolis, and operating the Handley Page O/400 and the Airco DH.10 Amiens as transport aircraft.

On 2 January 1922 Stewart was awarded the Air Force Cross in the King's New Year Honours, and on 13 February 1922 was transferred to the RAF Depot (Inland Area), back in England. On 24 October 1922, his short service commission expired, and Stewart was transferred to Reserve of Air Force Officers (Class A).

On 1 June 1923, still a Reserve officer, he was employed by the Regular Air Force for a period of a year, and was posted to No. 7 Squadron, a bomber unit based at RAF Bircham Newton, Norfolk. He was elected to membership in the Royal Aero Club on 14 November 1923. On 1 June 1924 his period of employment with the Regular Air Force was extended for a further year, but ended on 30 August 1924.

== Death ==
Stewart was then employed as a pilot by Imperial Airways, but his civilian career was tragically brief. On 24 December 1924 he took off from Croydon Airport, the sole crew of the de Havilland DH.34 G-EBBX, carrying seven passengers, and bound for Paris. After only a few minutes into the flight his aircraft was observed to be having difficulties, then crashed and burst in flames, killing Stewart and all on board.
