= Dundee Fortress Royal Engineers =

City of Dundee Fortress Engineers 320th (City of Dundee) Searchlight Battery 126 Army Engineer Regiment
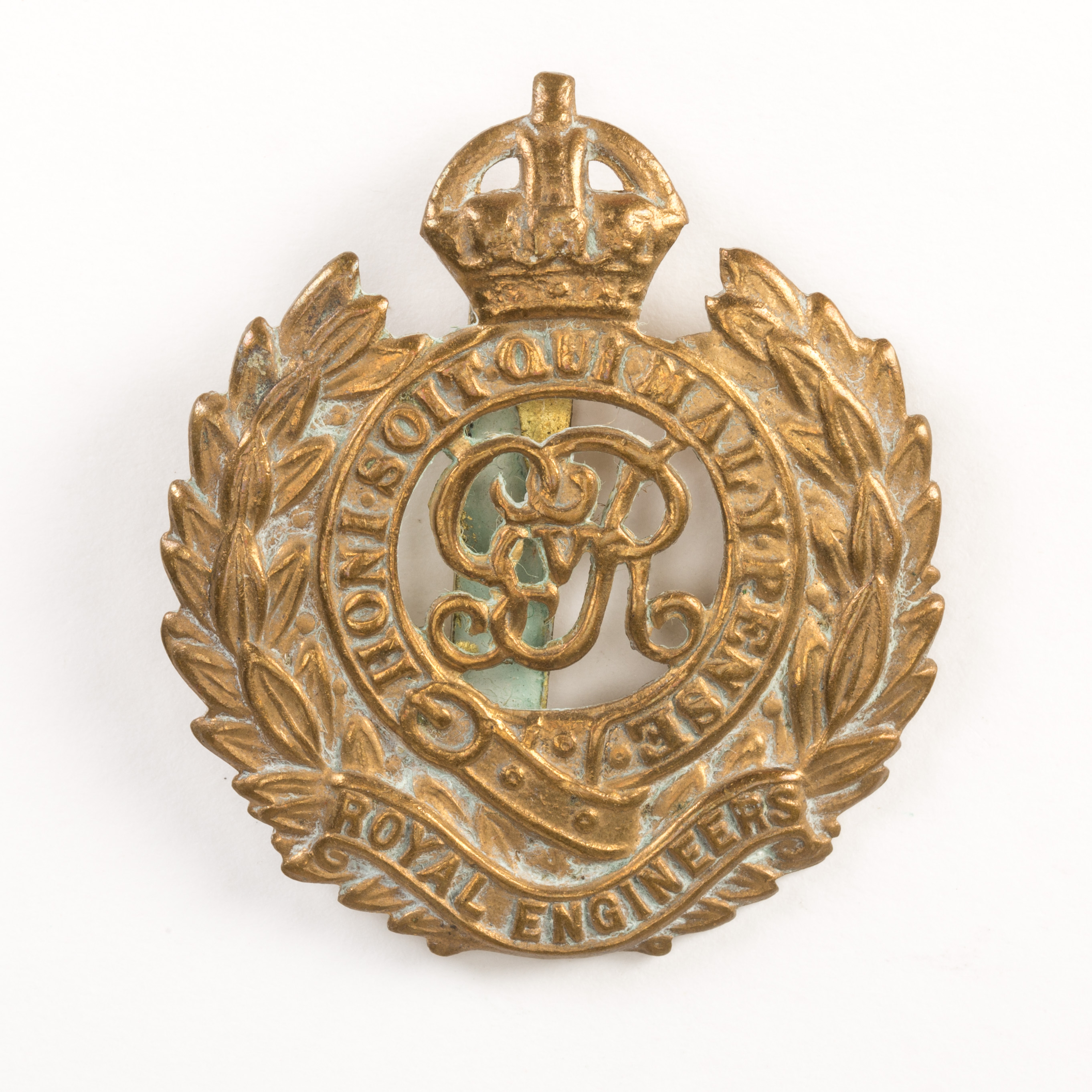
- RE Cap badge (King George V cipher)
- Active: 1908–1950
- Country: United Kingdom
- Branch: Territorial Army (United Kingdom)
- Role: Coast Defence; Air Defence; Army Engineers
- Size: 1–2 Companies
- Part of: 71st Division (1916–18); 51st (Highland) Searchlight Regiment (1938–42); 124th (Highland) Light Anti-Aircraft Regiment (1942–45)
- Garrison/HQ: Dundee
- Engagements: North Russia; The Blitz; Normandy; North West Europe

The Dundee Fortress Royal Engineers was a Scottish volunteer unit of the British Army formed in 1908. Its main role was the defence of the harbours and shipyards on the River Tay, but it also provided a detachment that saw active service in North Russia at the end of World War I. In the 1930s, it was turned into an air defence unit, in which role it served in World War II. A brief postwar revival ended in disbandment in 1950.

== Precursor unit ==
When Lieutenant-General Sir Andrew Clarke, Inspector-General of Fortifications 1882–6, did not have enough Regular Royal Engineers (RE) to man the fixed mines being installed to defend British seaports, he utilised the Volunteer Engineers for this task. After successful trials, the system was rolled out to ports around the country, and a new Volunteer company was raised at Dundee on 5 February 1887 to cover the Firth of Tay, entitled Tay Division Submarine Miners. It moved its headquarters to Broughty Ferry in 1890. For many years, its Honorary Colonel was Arthur Fitzgerald, 11th Lord Kinnaird.

By 1907, the War Office had decided to hand all submarine mining duties over to Militia units and the Volunteer submarine miners were disbanded. Although most of the units were converted into fortress engineers, this did not happen in the case of the Tay Division, which was disbanded with effect from 2 November.

== Territorial Force ==
Thus, when the Volunteers were subsumed into the new Territorial Force (TF) under the Haldane Reforms in 1908, a completely new unit of fortress engineers had to be raised for the Firth of Tay defences. It was entitled the City of Dundee (Fortress) Royal Engineers, with its HQ at 52 Taylors Lane, Dundee, and consisted of a single Works Company.

== World War I ==
On the outbreak of World War I, the fortress engineers were mobilised and moved into their war stations in the coastal defences. In August 1914, TF units were authorised to establish 2nd Line duplicate units to absorb the rush of volunteers coming forward. The City of Dundee unit thus formed the 1/1st Dundee Fortress Company, RE, and 2/1st Dundee Fortress Company, RE.

=== 1/1st City of Dundee Army Troops Company ===
Once it was clear that the threat to Britain's coastal defences was small, six of the fortress engineer units organised their 1st Line as 'Army Troops' companies for service on the Lines of Communication of the British Expeditionary Force. The 1/1st City of Dundee Fortress Company embarked for France on 6 May 1915 and after arriving at Abbeville was assigned to Second Army the following month. In February 1917, it was redesignated 554th (Dundee) Army Troops Company, RE. It remained serving with Second Army after the Armistice with Germany until at least June 1919.

=== 2/1st City of Dundee Army Troops Company ===
Initially, the 2nd Line were intended as reserve units to allow the 1st Line to go on service; however, in November 1916, the 2/1st Dundee Company was redesignated as a Field Company, RE, and assigned to 71st Division. When the TF engineers were numbered in February 1917, the company became 548th (Dundee) Field Company, RE.

71st Division was a home service formation, responsible for defending the coast of Essex from Mersea Island to Walton-on-the-Naze. Later, it became a training division, which was broken up in March 1918. One of its infantry brigades (214th Brigade) had been converted into a Special Service Brigade with attached troops and was earmarked to join the North Russia Expeditionary Force. In the event, 214th Brigade remained in the UK, but 548th (Dundee) Field Company, redesignated as an 'Army Troops Company', did proceed to Murmansk. The advance party landed on 20 June 1918, and was followed by the main body three days later.

The force at Murmansk defended the ice-free port facilities and the Murmansk–Petrograd railway as far as Kem on the White Sea, against the threat of attacks by German and Finnish White Guard forces in the closing months of World War I. It continued this duty during the complex postwar political and military exchanges with local Bolsheviks and Finnish Red Guards. It was finally withdrawn in 1920.

== Interwar ==
When the TF was reconstituted in 1920 - it was redesignated as the Territorial Army (TA) in 1921 - the City of Dundee Fortress Engineers reformed at the Drill Hall in Bell Street, Dundee. The contemporary Army List shows this as a single company, though the Dundee Directory for 1922-23 lists both a Works Company and an Electric Light Company. By 1927, it consisted of No 1 Company (City of Dundee) (Fortress) RE, listed as Coast Defence Troops in 51st (Highland) Divisional Area.

With the recognition of the increased threat of aerial bombing in any future war, the company was converted into an Independent Anti-Aircraft (AA) Searchlight Company in 1934 as 320th (City of Dundee) AA Company, RE. It gained a Regular RE officer as Adjutant, who was shared with 319th (City of Aberdeen) AA Company (converted at the same time from the Aberdeen Fortress Royal Engineers).

== World War II ==
With the continued expansion of the TA's air defences, 320th (Dundee) Company and 319th (Aberdeen) Company combined with a newly raised battery at Cowdenbeath in 1938 to form 51st (Highland) AA Battalion, RE. In August 1939, Anti-Aircraft Command was mobilised and 51st AA Bn took its place in the air defences of Scotland. A year later, the RE searchlight battalions were transferred to the Royal Artillery (RA), and the unit became 51st (Highland) Searchlight Regiment, RA (TA), serving throughout the Battle of Britain and The Blitz.

In February 1942, the regiment was converted to the Light Anti-Aircraft (LAA) artillery role as 124 (Highland) Light Anti-Aircraft Regiment, RA (TA) and it served with Second Army in Normandy and North West Europe.

== Postwar ==
When the TA was reformed in 1947, 124 LAA Regiment was reconstituted as 586 (Highland) LAA/SL Rgt with its HQ at Dundee. This unit was absorbed into 276th (Highland) Field Rgt on the disbandment of AA Command in 1955.

However, a Royal Engineer unit was also formed at Dundee in 1947, which was regarded as the lineal descendant of the Dundee Fortress Engineers and derived its seniority (1908) from that unit. Designated 126 Army Engineer Regiment, RE, it consisted of:

- 240 Field Squadron
- 274 Field Squadron
- 275 Field Squadron
- 320 Field Park Squadron

This TA regiment and its squadrons were disbanded in 1950, their numbers being transferred to 126 Advanced Engineer Stores Regiment of the Supplementary Reserve/Army Emergency Reserve, which itself was disbanded in 1961.

== Prominent members ==
Captain Lewis Collins, MC, credited with five aerial victories in 1918 as an observer in the Royal Flying Corps/Royal Air Force, was born in Dundee and originally enlisted as a sapper in the Fortress Engineers.

== Online sources ==
- The Aerodrome
- British Army units from 1945 on
- British Military History
- Mark Conrad, The British Army 1914.
- The Royal Artillery 1939–45
- Scotland's Urban Past
