= Patricia Howard =

Patricia Magill (née Howard; born 1947) was the first regular British Women's Royal Air Force officer to wear an aircrew brevet ("wings") and therefore the first to serve in the General Duties (Flying) Branch. (Note: Jean Bird was awarded her wings as an officer in the General Duties Branch of the Women's RAF Volunteer Reserve in 1952.)

Howard grew up in Minster-in-Sheppey on the Isle of Sheppey, Kent, England, and was educated at Sheppey Technical High School. She joined the WRAF as an air traffic control assistant, but later qualified as an air quartermaster (later changed to air loadmaster) with the rank of sergeant. She served with No.10 Squadron at RAF Brize Norton (acquiring 5,497 flying hours on the Vickers VC10), No. 511 Squadron (acquiring 616 flying hours on the Bristol Britannia), the Queen's Flight (acquiring 15 hours on the Hawker Siddeley Andover C Mk II), and No. 216 Squadron (acquiring 179 flying hours).

On 21 February 1974, six years after she qualified as aircrew and at the age of 26, Howard was commissioned as a flying officer from the Officer Cadet Training Unit at RAF Henlow. She was promoted flight lieutenant on 21 February 1976.

She married on 2 April 1977, taking the surname Magill, and retired as a flight lieutenant on 25 March 1985.
