= Aberdeen Fortress Royal Engineers =

British Territorial Army unit

City of Aberdeen Fortress Engineers 319th (City of Aberdeen) Searchlight Battery
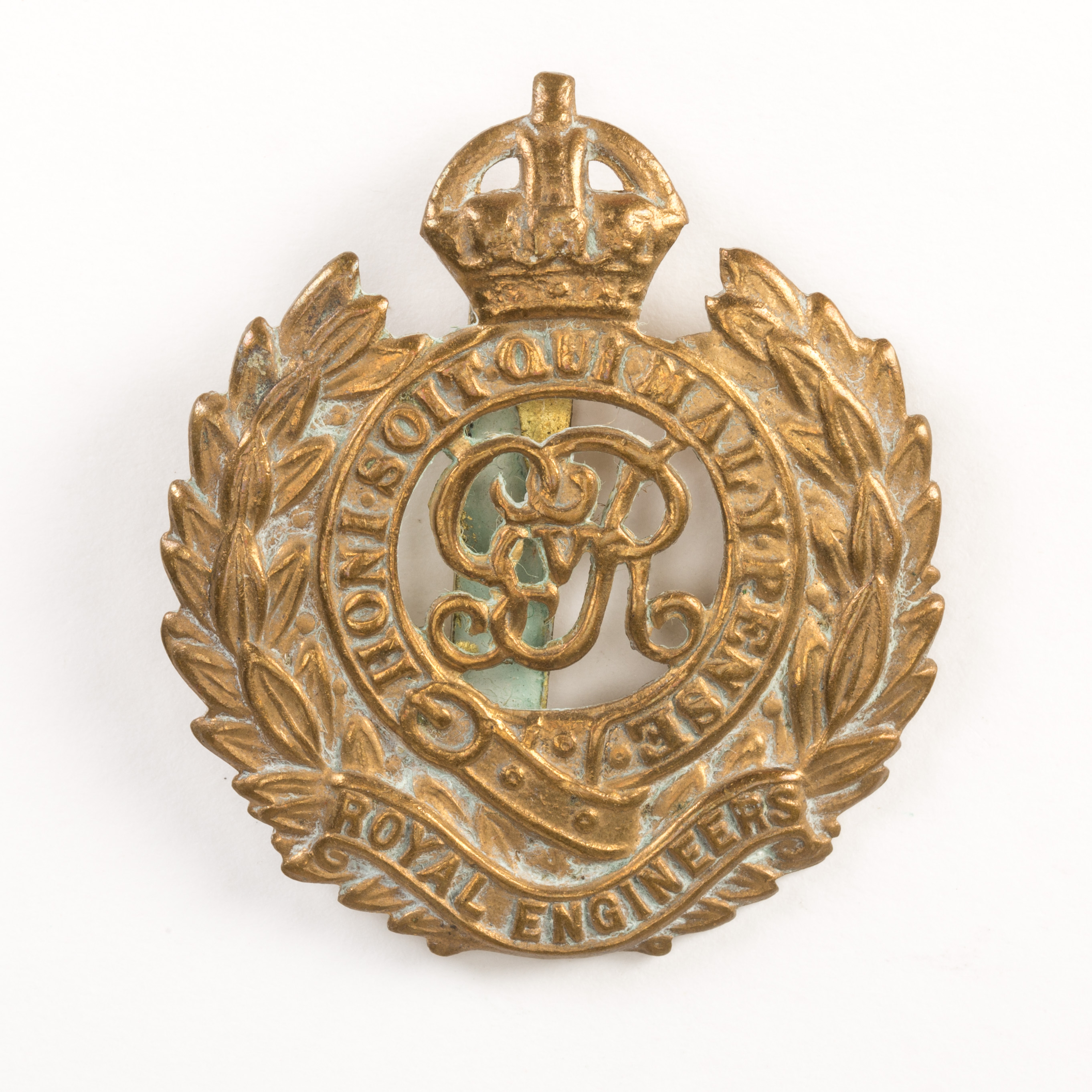
- RE Cap badge (King George V cipher)
- Active: 1908–1945
- Country: United Kingdom
- Branch: Territorial Army
- Role: Coast Defence; Field Engineering; Air Defence
- Size: 1–2 Companies
- Garrison/HQ: Aberdeen
- Engagements: Western Front (World War I); The Blitz; Normandy; North West Europe

The Aberdeen Fortress Royal Engineers was a Scottish volunteer unit of the British Army formed in 1908. Its main role was defence of the Scottish coast, but it served on the Western Front during World War I. In the 1930s it was converted into an air defence unit, in which role it served in World War II.

== Origin ==
The unit was formed in 1908 when the Territorial Force (TF) was created from the former Volunteers under the Haldane Reforms. The 1st Aberdeenshire Engineer Volunteers, which had existed since 1878, was split to form the 1st Highland Field Company and Highland Divisional Telegraph Company of the Highland Division, and the City of Aberdeen (Fortress) Royal Engineers. The latter unit consisted of a single Works Company, which continued to share its headquarters at 80 Hardgate, Aberdeen, with the Highland Field and Telegraph companies.

== World War I ==
The TF was mobilised on the outbreak of war in August 1914 and the City of Aberdeen Fortress Engineers took their place in the Scottish Coast defences.

Once it was clear that the threat to Britain's coastal defences was small, six of the fortress engineer units reorganised as 'Army Troops' companies for service on the Lines of Communication of the British Expeditionary Force. One of these was the Aberdeen Fortress Company, which embarked for France on 24 April 1915 and arrived at Calais.

When the TF's RE companies were numbered in February 1917, it became 552nd (Aberdeen) Army Troops Company, RE. Little is known of its service, other than it was on the Lines of Communication in January 1917, with IX Corps in September 1918, and Fifth Army at the time of the Armistice.

The unit was demobilised in January 1920.

In addition, 553rd (Aberdeen) Works Company was formed in 1915, probably as the 2nd Line duplicate of the original City of Aberdeen unit, and was numbered in February 1917. Nothing is known of its service.

== Interwar ==
When the TF was reconstituted as the Territorial Army (TA) in the 1920s, the City of Aberdeen Fortress Engineers reformed at Fonthill Barracks, Aberdeen, consisting of No 1 (Works) Company, listed as Coast Defence Troops in 51st (Highland) Divisional Area.

With the recognition of the increased threat of aerial bombing in any future war, the company was converted into an Independent Anti-Aircraft (AA) Searchlight Company in 1934 as 319th (City of Aberdeen) AA Company, RE. It gained a Regular RE officer as Adjutant, who was shared with 320th (City of Dundee) AA Company (converted at the same time from the Dundee Fortress Royal Engineers).

== World War II ==
See main article: 51st (Highland) Searchlight Regiment, Royal Artillery

With the continued expansion of the TA's air defences, 319th (Aberdeen) Company and 320th (Dundee) Company combined with a newly raised battery at Cowdenbeath in 1938 to form 51st (Highland) AA Battalion, RE. In August 1939, Anti-Aircraft Command was mobilised and 51st AA Bn took its place in the air defences of Scotland. A year later the RE searchlight battalions were transferred to the Royal Artillery (RA), and the unit became 51st (Highland) Searchlight Regiment, RA (TA), serving throughout the Battle of Britain and The Blitz.

In February 1942, the regiment was converted to the Light Anti-Aircraft (LAA) artillery role as 124 (Highland) Light Anti-Aircraft Regiment, RA (TA) and it served with Second Army in Normandy and North West Europe.

== Postwar ==
When the TA was reconstituted in 1947, the regiment was reformed as 586 (Highland) LAA Regiment, RA (later 586 (Highland) LAA/Searchlight Regiment), based at Dundee, and the link with Aberdeen was severed.
