= Lewis Collins (RAF officer) =

Scottish World War I flying ace

Lewis Isaac Collins
- Born: 7 November 1894; Dundee, Forfarshire, Scotland
- Died: 1 June 1971 (aged 76); Dundee, Forfarshire, Scotland
- Burial place: Western Cemetery, Dundee
- Military career
- Allegiance: United Kingdom
- Branch: British Army; Royal Air Force
- Service years: 1915–1919
- Rank: Captain
- Units: City of Dundee (Fortress) Engineers; Black Watch (Royal Highlanders); Alexandra, Princess of Wales's Own (Yorkshire Regiment); No. 18 Squadron RAF
- Conflicts: World War I
- Awards: Military Cross

Captain Lewis Isaac Collins MC (born 7 November 1894 – 1 June 1971) was a Scottish World War I flying ace credited with five aerial victories.

== Biography ==
Collins was born in Dundee, Scotland, the son of Isaac John and Helen Isles (née McFee) Collins. He was educated at the High School of Dundee.

He first served as a sapper in the City of Dundee (Fortress) Engineers, a Royal Engineers Territorial Force unit, before being commissioned as a second lieutenant in the Black Watch (Royal Highlanders) on 20 September 1915. He was soon transferred, joining the 10th (Service) Battalion of Alexandra, Princess of Wales's Own (Yorkshire Regiment) on 27 September 1915. He was promoted to lieutenant on 27 March 1917, and to captain on 1 May 1917.

Collins was seconded to the Royal Flying Corps and posted to No. 18 Squadron as an observer/gunner. Between 25 March and 17 June 1918, with pilot Captain David A. Stewart flying an Airco DH.4, he gained five victories, and in September was awarded the Military Cross. He was transferred to the unemployed list on 25 February 1919.

On 21 September 1927, following the death of his father, Collins and his brother David, took over and continued the family business of I. J. Collins, Tailors and Clothiers, of 12–14 Whitehall Street, Dundee.

On 18 October 1939, soon after the start of World War II, Collins was commissioned as a second lieutenant in the National Defence Company.

Collins died in Dundee on 1 June 1971, and is buried in the Western Cemetery there.

== Honours and awards ==
Military Cross
Temporary Captain Lewis Isaac Collins, Yorkshire Regiment and Royal Air Force.
For conspicuous gallantry and devotion to duty. He has carried out twelve successful bombing raids, fifteen low bombing and reconnaissance flights, and ten successful photographic flights. He has carried out many low flying, harassing and bombing patrols of great value. In addition he has destroyed two enemy machines, on one occasion being attacked by three of the enemy.
