= William Miller (RAF officer) =

British flying ace

- Born: 12 May 1892; Newcastle upon Tyne
- Died: 12 April 1962 (aged 69); Stebbing, Essex
- Military career
- Allegiance: United Kingdom
- Branch: British Army; Royal Air Force
- Service years: 1914–1921; 1939–1946
- Rank: Squadron Leader
- Nickname: Bill
- Units: Northumberland Fusiliers; No. 18 Squadron RAF
- Conflicts: First World War; Western Front; Second World War
- Awards: Distinguished Flying Cross

Squadron Leader William Miller, DFC (12 May 1892 – 12 April 1962) was a British flying ace of the First World War, who was credited with six aerial victories. Miller worked in the Royal Air Force Educational Service between the World Wars. He returned to service for the Second World War, rising to the rank of Squadron Leader.

== Early life and British Army ==
Miller was born in Newcastle upon Tyne on 12 May 1892, and graduated from Durham University before joining the British Army at the start of the First World War. He first served as a second lieutenant in a Reserve Battalion of the Northumberland Fusiliers until 15 July 1915, when he was transferred to the 20th (Service) Battalion (1st Tyneside Scottish), for service in France. Miller was promoted to lieutenant on 1 January 1917, and was appointed an acting captain while serving as a company commander from 31 May 1917 until 17 January 1918.

== Combat pilot and flying ace ==
Miller then transferred to the Royal Flying Corps, and was granted a commission as a second lieutenant (honorary lieutenant) on 15 May 1918, to serve as an observer officer. Miller was posted to No. 18 Squadron RAF on 4 April, only days after the Royal Flying Corps and the Royal Naval Air Service were merged to form the Royal Air Force (RAF), to fly in the Airco DH.4 two-seater day bomber. He gained his first aerial victories while flying with Captain David A. Stewart, accounting for two Fokker D.VII on 30 May 1918. From then on he flew with Captain George Darvill, shooting down four more D.VIIs, one each on 8 and 28 July, and two on 4 September. Miller was wounded in action on 6 September 1918.

On 1 January 1919 he was awarded the Distinguished Flying Cross. On 12 June 1919 Miller was transferred to the RAF's Administrative Branch, and then to the unemployed list on 10 October. He relinquished his commission in the Northumberland Fusiliers "on account of ill-health caused by wounds" on 2 November, retaining the rank of lieutenant, but did not relinquish his RAF commission until 30 June 1921, after accepting an appointment in the Territorial Force.

== Post-war and later life ==
Miller served as a Civilian Education Officer in the Royal Air Force Educational Service throughout the 1920s and 1930s, serving in Iraq and the Far East.

On the outbreak of the Second World War, Miller returned to military service, being commissioned as a flight lieutenant in the Administrative and Special Duties Branch of the Royal Air Force Volunteer Reserve on 1 September 1939. He was promoted to squadron leader on 1 December 1941. After serving in Britain, Egypt and South Africa, Miller eventually resigned his commission on 3 June 1946, retaining the rank of squadron leader.

== Bibliography ==
- Franks, Norman; Guest, Russell; Alegi, Gregory (2008). Above The War Fronts: A Complete Record of the British Two-seater Bomber Pilot and Observer Aces, the British Two-seater Fighter Observer Aces, and the Belgian, Italian, Austro-Hungarian and Russian Fighter Aces, 1914-1918. Grub Street Publishing. ISBN 1898697566, ISBN 978-1898697565
