= RAF Harlaxton =

Former Royal Air Force base in Lincolnshire, England

RAF Harlaxton
- Harlaxton, Lincolnshire in England
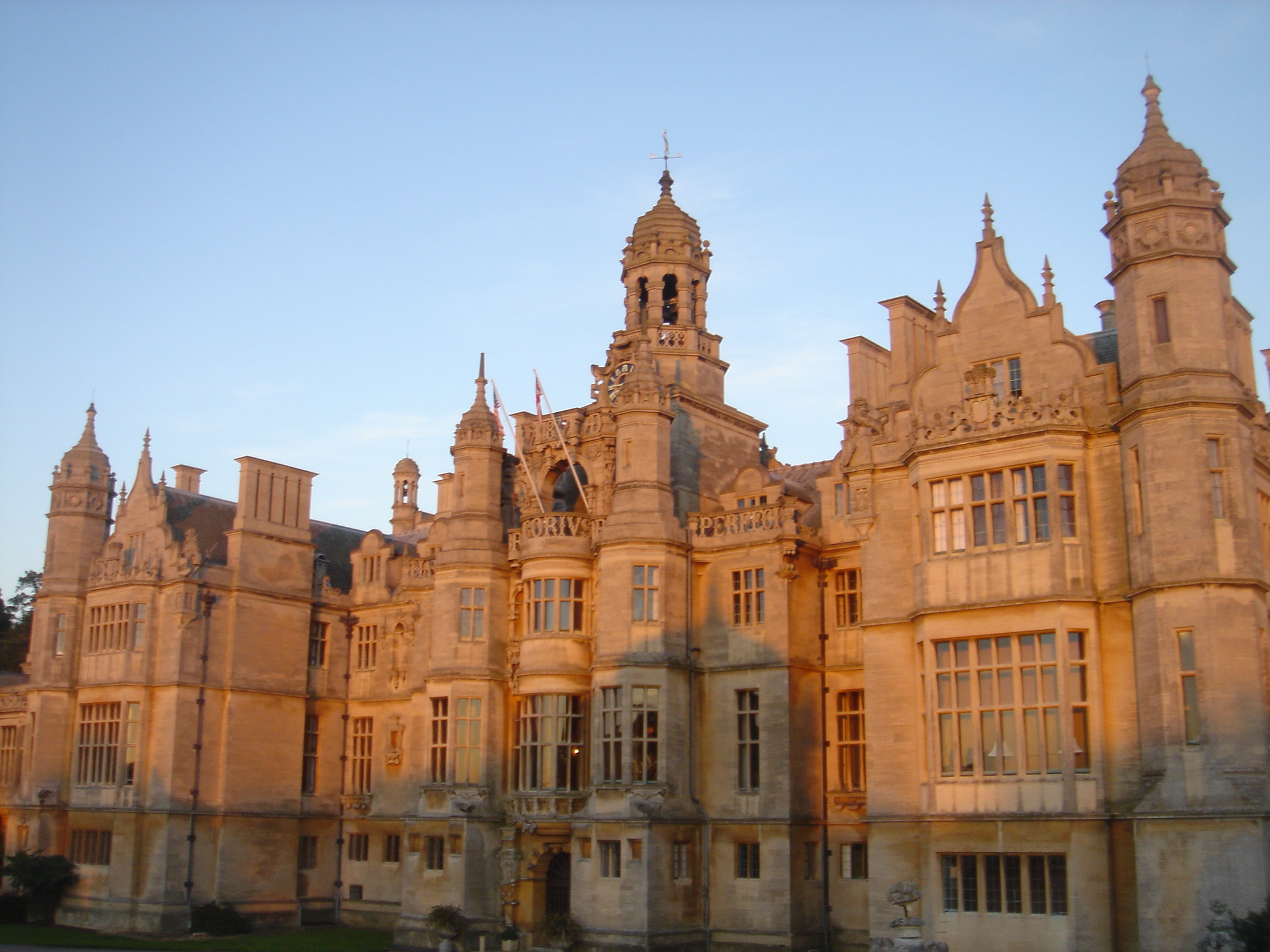
- Harlaxton Manor was requisitioned by the RAF during the Second World War as the station's officers' mess.

Site information
- Type: Royal Air Force satellite station
- Owner: Air Ministry
- Operator: Royal Flying Corps; Royal Air Force
- Controlled by: RAF Flying Training Command

Location
- Shown within Lincolnshire RAF Harlaxton (the United Kingdom)
- Coordinates: 52°52′46″N 000°39′33″W

Site history
- Built: 1916
- In use: 1916 - 1919; 1942 - 1957
- Battles/wars: European theatre of World War II

Airfield information
- Elevation: 61 metres (200 ft) AMSL
Runways
Direction	Length and surface
NNW/SSE	1,189 metres (3,901 ft) Grass
WSW/ENE	1,189 metres (3,901 ft) Grass
SW/NE	1,189 metres (3,901 ft) Grass
- Operated as a satellite unit of RAF Spitalgate and later RAF Cranwell. Decommissioned and closed in 1957; Flying training establishment and later a relief landing ground for RAF Grantham (RAF Spitalgate)

Royal Air Force Harlaxton or more simply RAF Harlaxton is a former Royal Air Force satellite station near the village of Harlaxton, 3 mi (4.8 km) south west of Grantham, Lincolnshire, England. The airfield was located in a triangle of flat fields midway between Harlaxton Manor (now the University of Evansville's British campus) and the nearby village of Stroxton.

Originally constructed as a Royal Flying Corps aerodrome in November 1916 it closed between the wars, reopening in 1942 as a Royal Air Force flying training establishment until its final closure in 1957.

During the Second World War Harlaxton Manor was requisitioned by the Royal Air Force as the station's officers' mess and later to temporarily house the headquarters of the 1st Airborne Division.

== History ==
The airfield opened in November 1916 as a Royal Flying Corps training aerodrome with three grassed runways laid out in an equilateral triangle, unusually oriented to the north. The aerodrome remained busy throughout the First World War as a flying training establishment with a large number of aircraft present, flying mostly a motley assortment of de Havilland DH marques and Sopwith Camels.

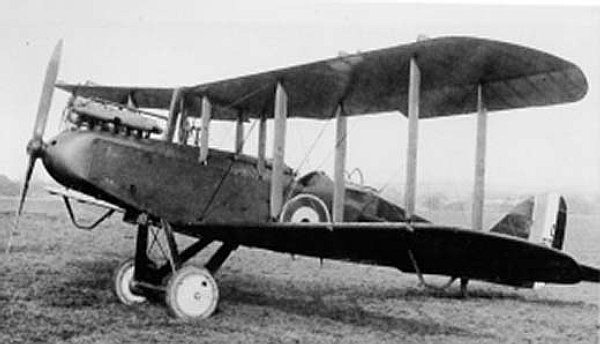
de Havilland DH-9 bomber

The Royal Flying Corps' No.98 Squadron formed at Harlaxton from elements drawn from the training squadrons. After training at the station and Old Sarum Airfield the squadron was deployed to France in a day-bombing role flying DH.9s.

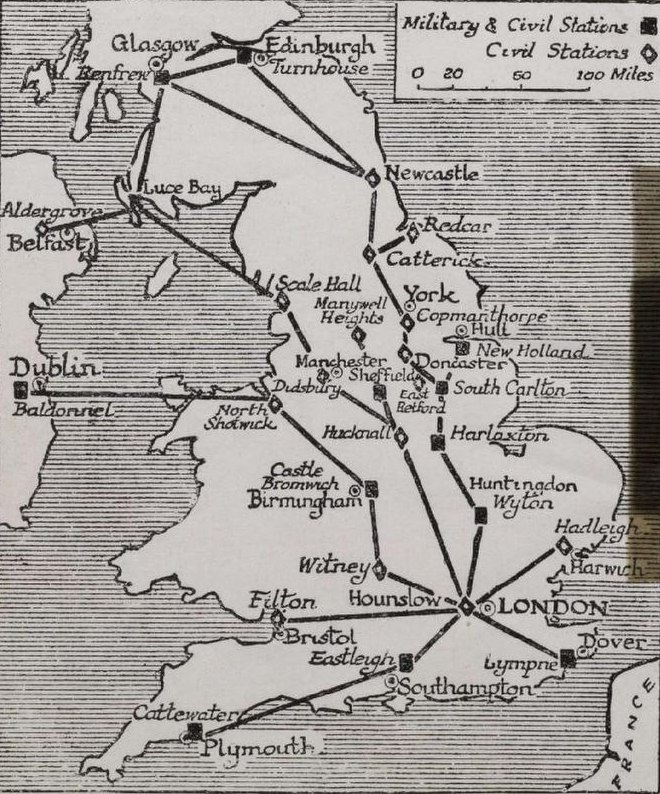
"Map of Air Routes and Landing Places in Great Britain, as temporarily arranged by the Air Ministry for civilian flying", published in 1919, showing Harlaxton as a "military and civil station", and as a stop on the route between Hounslow, near London, and the north.

From 1919, civilian services operated.

The station was mothballed and placed on a care and maintenance basis between the wars. Surveyed in 1937 as a possible fighter airfield for the defence of Nottingham, Leicester and Birmingham it was decided that the terrain was unsuitable for tarmac runways. Instead the grass runways were retained and a major building expansion programme was undertaken. In 1942 RAF Harlaxton reopened as a satellite field and relief landing ground for the flying training squadron posted to RAF Spitalgate, Grantham under the command of No. 21 (Training) Group RAF.

Harlaxton Manor was requisitioned by the War Department and utilised as the station's officers' mess. In the period ahead of the D-day invasion the manor also housed the Headquarters of the Army's 1st Airborne Division during their detailed preparations.

As the war came to a close the station continued in a satellite and occasional relief landing ground role but now for the flying training facility at RAF Cranwell. When flying training at Cranwell switched to jet aircraft in the mid-1950s Harlaxton's grass runways were no longer suitable and the RAF station finally closed in 1957.

A Royal Observer Corps aircraft spotting post was located on the north-east perimeter of the airfield during the Second World War and would have been responsible for initiating air raid warnings to the Grantham area during hostilities. An underground nuclear bunker was built on the same site in the 1960s and was used throughout the Cold War.

The underground post was only abandoned in 1991 when the ROC was stood down and now stands derelict after a fire was started by vandals.

== Harlaxton incidents ==
On 29 January 1945 a United States Army Air Forces (USAAF) Douglas C-47 Skytrain transport aircraft attempted an emergency landing at Harlaxton and suffered major airframe damage during the incident. The accident investigators found that the aircraft was damaged beyond repair and it was written off. The crew suffered only minor injuries and there were no fatalities.

UK bomb disposal teams were having continuing problems dealing with German 2 kilogram butterfly bombs as no examples had been safely dismantled to learn the process. Whilst dealing with eight that had fallen on RAF Harlaxton and failed to explode, Flight Sergeant Hanford of RAF Bomb Disposal from nearby RAF Digby noticed that the arming rods had not fully withdrawn. He screwed them back by hand into the fuzes enabling the bomb disposal scientists to dismantle them and use them for instructional purposes. Hanford was later awarded the British Empire Medal for this feat of extreme bravery.

== List of units posted to RAF Harlaxton ==
Date of arrival	Unit	Notes
November 1916	Opened as Royal Flying Corps Aerodrome Harlaxton	
13 November 1916	No. 44 Reserve Squadron RFC	Renamed No. 44 Training Squadron RFC in May 1917
30 January 1917	No. 68 (Australian) Squadron RFC	Remnants of No.2 Squadron RFC arrived by boat from Kantara Egypt. Recruiting a group of Australian pilots already in the UK the new squadron formed and trained at Harlaxton. Equipped with DH5s it deployed to France in September 1917, specialising in ground attack owing to the shortcomings of its equipment.
May 1917	No. 44 Training Squadron RFC	Renamed No. 26 Training Squadron RFC on 22 September 1917
22 August 1917	No. 3 Training Squadron RFC	Disbanded 15 August 1918
30 August 1917	No. 98 Squadron RFC	This bomber squadron was formed at Harlaxton, from a nucleus flight from No. 44 Training Squadron and in the following spring crossed to France as a day-bombing unit equipped with DH9s.
22 September 1917	No. 26 Training Squadron RFC	Disbanded November 1918
November 1917	No. 20 Training Squadron RFC	Reformed on 15 August 1918 as part of No. 40 Training Depot Station RAF
6 December 1917	No. 53 Training Squadron RFC	Reformed on 15 August 1918 as part of No. 40 Training Depot Station RAF
12 December 1917	No. 64 Training Squadron RFC	Reformed on 15 August 1918 as part of No. 40 Training Depot Station RAF
1 April 1918	RFC Harlaxton is renamed RAF Harlaxton	
15 August 1918	No. 40 Training Depot Station RAF	Disbanded 8 May 1919
June 1919	RAF Harlaxton is mothballed and placed on a care and maintenance basis	
24 February 1944	RAF Harlaxton reopens as a relief landing ground for No. 12 Flying Training School RAF posted to RAF Spitalgate	
November 1944		No.12 FTS renames as No. 12 (Pilots) Advanced Flying Unit RAF. Disbanded February 1945.
February 1945	No. 17 Service Flying Training School RAF	Based at RAF Cranwell, using RAF Harlaxton as a relief landing ground.
1957	RAF Harlaxton disestablished and closed down	

== The airfield today ==
Little sign of the airfield remains today, and its runways have been returned to agriculture. The M&E building in the farmyard stands derelict. There are, however, the remains of a standard "Allen-Williams Turret" rotatable anti-aircraft defence installation.

Unlike many former Lincolnshire airfields, no permanent memorial plaque exists. The site is now owned by a company who have restored the air raid shelters and main building and erection of a memorial is planned.

== See also ==
- List of former Royal Air Force stations
- RAF Spitalgate
