= Molly Allott =

Air Commodore Molly Greenwood Allott CB (28 December 1918 – 12 December 2013) was director of the Women's Royal Air Force from 1973 to 1976.

Born in Wortley, Leeds, Yorkshire, she was educated at Sheffield High School, and joined the Women's Auxiliary Air Force in 1941. She remained in the WAAF after the war, and continued into the permanent Women's Royal Air Force when it was established in 1949. After postings in Egypt and Singapore, she served on the staff of John Grandy, commanding RAF Germany, from 1960 to 1963, and returned to the United Kingdom for a staff post in RAF Fighter Command.

She later served at RAF Training Command before being promoted to director of the Women's Royal Air Force in 1973, in succession to Philippa Marshall. She was concurrently made an aide-de-camp to the Queen, holding both titles until 1976.

After stepping down as director, she chaired the Girls Venture Corps and held positions with the Union Jack Club and the RAF Benevolent Fund. She helped fundraise for the Battle of Britain Museum at the RAF Museum, Hendon. She was the first woman in the RAF Supply Branch to have been promoted to the rank of Air Commodore.

Military offices
Preceded by Philippa Marshall	Director of the Women's Royal Air Force; 1973 to 1976	Succeeded by Joy Tamblin
