= Philippa Marshall =

British Royal Air Force officer

- Born: Philippa Frances Marshall; 4 November 1920; Stoke-on-Trent, Staffordshire, England
- Died: 4 February 2005 (aged 84)
- Military career
- Allegiance: United Kingdom
- Branch: Royal Air Force
- Service years: 1941–1973
- Rank: Air commodore
- Service number: 4937
- Conflicts: Second World War

Air Commodore Philippa Frances Marshall CB OBE (4 November 1920 – 4 February 2005) was a British Royal Air Force officer, who served as director of the Women's Royal Air Force from 1969 to 1973.

== Biography ==
Marshall was born on 4 November 1920 in Stoke-on-Trent, Staffordshire, England. She was educated at St Dominic's High School for Girls, an all-girls private school in Stoke-on-Trent.

In 1941, Marshall joined the Women's Auxiliary Air Force (WAAF). On 10 June 1942, she was commissioned as an assistant section officer (equivalent in rank to pilot officer) on probation. With the creation of the Women's Royal Air Force (WRAF) in 1949, she was transferred to the WRAF as a flight officer (equivalent to flight lieutenant) on 1 February 1949 with seniority in that rank from 10 December 1946.

She was promoted to squadron officer (equivalent to squadron leader) on 1 July 1953, to wing officer (equivalent to wing commander) on 1 January 1964, and to group officer (equivalent to group captain) on 1 July 1966. From 1968 to 1969, she served as commanding admin officer at RAF Strike Command. In 1969, she was appointed director of the Women's Royal Air Force in succession to Dame Felicity Hill. On 1 July 1969, she was promoted to air commodore, becoming the most senior ranking woman in the Royal Air Force. She stepped down as director in July 1973 to be succeeded by Molly Allott, and retired on 1 September 1973.

Marshall died on 4 February 2005, aged 84.

== Honours ==
In the 1956 New Year Honours, Marshall was appointed an Officer of the Order of the British Empire (OBE). In the 1971, she was appointed a Companion of the Order of the Bath (CB).

Military offices
Preceded by Dame Felicity Hill	Director of the Women's Royal Air Force; 1969 to 1973	Succeeded by Molly Allott
