= Nancy Salmon =

Air Commandant Dame Nancy Marion Salmon DBE (2 May 1906 – 9 October 1999), also known after 1962 by her married name, Dame Nancy Snagge, was a senior British women's air force officer. She was Director of the Women's Royal Air Force (WRAF) from 1950 to 1956.

== Early life ==
Salmon was born in Hampstead, the daughter of a chartered accountant, and she was educated at Notting Hill High School. In 1938 she joined the Auxiliary Territorial Service as a driver.

== Women's Auxiliary Air Force ==
Salmon transferred from the ATS to the Women's Auxiliary Air Force in 1939 when it was formed, and her first posting was a barrage balloon unit. She later spent time as officer in charge of personnel at Fighter Command, RAF Stanmore, before becoming a staff officer at No 77 Signals Wing in Liverpool. She was later responsible for WAAF radar operators. At the end of the 1940s she helped with drafting regulations and a plan for more integration with the Royal Air Force, which ultimately led to the formation of the Women's Royal Air Force. In July 1950, Salmon went from a staff officer with the British Air Forces of Occupation in Germany to Director of the Women's Royal Air Force. Salmon retired from the WRAF in 1956.

== Personal life ==
Following retirement from the WRAF, Salmon cared for her mother before becoming head of personnel in the John Lewis Partnership. It was there that she met company director Geoffrey Snagge, a widower, and they married in 1962. She died in Winchester on October 9, 1999.

== Honours ==
Salmon was appointed an Officer of the Order of the British Empire (OBE) in 1946, and elevated to Dame Commander of the Order of the British Empire (DBE) in 1955.
