= Ruth Montague =

British air force officer (1939–2024)

Air Commodore Ruth Mary Bryceson Montague ADC FRSA (1 June 1939 – 2 August 2024) was a British Air Force officer, who served as Director of the Women's Royal Air Force (WRAF) from 1989 to 1994. She was the last head of the WRAF, before it was disestablished in 1994 and merged into the Royal Air Force.

Montague died on 2 August 2024, at the age of 85.
