= Herbert Hamilton =

British WWI flying ace (1895–1918)

Herbert James Hamilton
- Born: 30 April 1895; Hornsey, Middlesex, England
- Died: 13 June 1918 (aged 23); Tadcaster, Yorkshire, England
- Burial place: Islington Cemetery, Middlesex, England; 51°36′00″N 0°09′53″W
- Military career
- Allegiance: United Kingdom
- Branch: British Army; Royal Air Force
- Service years: 1913–1918
- Rank: Captain
- Units: The London Regiment (Artists Rifles); Duke of Cornwall's Light Infantry; No. 20 Squadron RFC; No. 1 Squadron RAF; No. 29 Squadron RFC
- Conflicts: World War I • Western Front
- Awards: Military Cross

Captain Herbert James Hamilton MC (30 April 1895 – 13 June 1918) was a British flying ace of World War I, credited with seven aerial victories.

== Early life ==
Hamilton was born on 30 April 1895 in Hornsey, Middlesex, the second son of Arthur Ernest and Florence Jane Hamilton. He was educated at the Stationers' Company's School and entered the wholesale silk trade.

== World War I ==
Hamilton enlisted into the 28th (County of London) Battalion of The London Regiment (Artists Rifles) as a private on 30 September 1913, serving in France and Flanders from October 1914 as part of the British Expeditionary Force. He was commissioned as a second lieutenant in The Duke of Cornwall's Light Infantry on 29 August 1915.

In February 1916 he was seconded to the Royal Flying Corps as an observer. Posted to No. 20 Squadron, flying the F.E.2b, on 21 July 1916 Hamilton and pilot Captain Reginald Maxwell shot down a Rumpler C reconnaissance aircraft west of Lille.

After six months Hamilton was sent to Montrose in Scotland to train as a pilot, being appointed a flying officer on 27 November 1916. He remained at Montrose for nine months as an instructor before returning to France in August 1917. Posted to No. 1 Squadron, flying the Nieuport 27, he was promoted to lieutenant on 1 October, and gained his second victory by driving down a DFW C reconnaissance aircraft over Comines the next day.

He was appointed a flight commander with the rank of acting-captain on 23 November, and joined No. 29 Squadron. In his Nieuport 27 he drove down two more enemy aircraft on 5 December 1917 and 16 February 1918. Hamilton returned to No. 1 Squadron in March, and flying the S.E.5a destroyed a balloon on the 9th, and two aircraft on the 11th and 13th. Hamilton was forced down by a Fokker Triplane on 26 March and injured. He was sent back to England in April to recuperate, and then became a flight instructor in the 68th Training Squadron at Tadcaster Aerodrome in Yorkshire.

== Death ==
Hamilton died aged 23 in a flying accident at Tadcaster on 13 June 1918, when his aircraft, which was a Sopwith Camel, shed a wing. He is buried in Islington Cemetery, London.

== Honours and awards ==
Hamilton was awarded the Military Cross, which was gazetted posthumously on 26 July 1918. His citation read:

Lieutenant (Temporary Captain) Herbert James Hamilton, Duke of Cornwall's Light Infantry, attached Royal Air Force.

"For conspicuous gallantry and devotion to duty. He has on many occasions displayed the utmost dash and fearlessness in engaging enemy aircraft at close range, and has succeeded in destroying a considerable number. He also attacked with machine-gun fire and from low altitudes enemy formations on the ground and dropped bombs on points of importance behind the hostile lines. He has invariably shown great determination and a fine offensive spirit."
