= RAF Spitalgate =

Royal Air Force station in Grantham, UK

RAF Spitalgate RAF Grantham
- Grantham, Lincolnshire in England
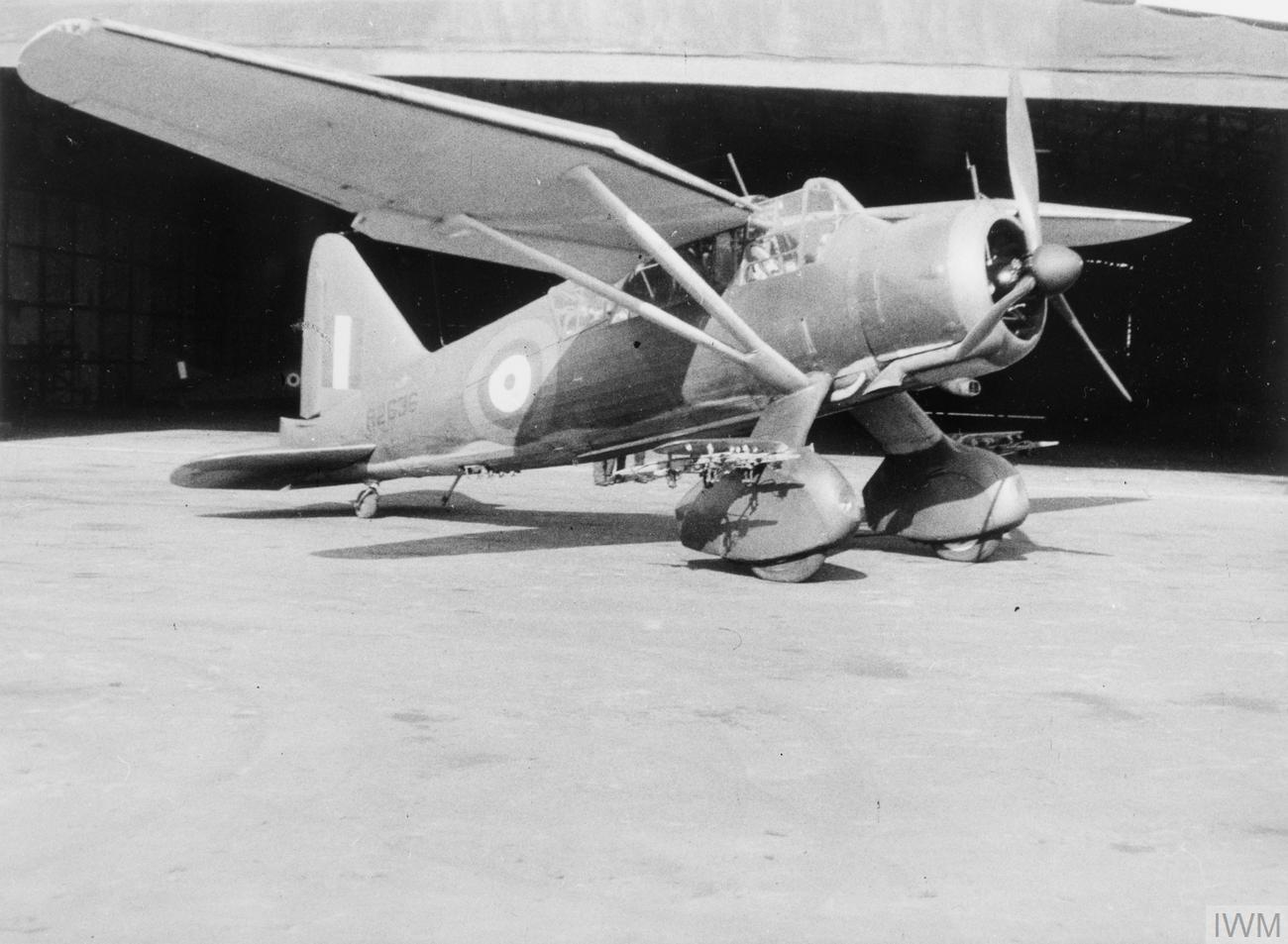
- Westland Lysander I of No. 5 Group Communications Flight at RAF Spitalgate

Site information
- Type: Royal Air Force station
- Owner: Ministry of Defence
- Operator: Royal Flying Corps; Royal Air Force
- Controlled by: RAF Flying Training Command

Location
- Shown within Lincolnshire RAF Spitalgate (the United Kingdom)
- Coordinates: 52°54′05″N 000°36′15″W

Site history
- Built: 1915
- In use: 1915 - 1975
- Battles/wars: European theatre of World War II; Cold War

Airfield information
- Elevation: 126 metres (413 ft) AMSL
- Originally named RFC Grantham and later RAF Grantham. Flying training establishment and Flying Training Command.

Royal Air Force Spitalgate or more simply RAF Spitalgate formerly known as RFC Grantham and RAF Grantham was a Royal Flying Corps and Royal Air Force station located 2 mi (3.2 km) south east of the centre of Grantham, Lincolnshire, England fronting onto the main A52 road.

== History ==
The station opened in 1915 as Royal Flying Corps Station Grantham, becoming RAF Grantham on 1 April 1918 - a name it bore until 1942 when it was renamed as RAF Spitalgate. Throughout the First World War the station focused on flying training, hosting a succession of reserve (Nos 49, 86 (Canadian), 11, and 50) and then training squadrons (the renamed No. 49 (Training) Squadron and 15, 20, and 37, plus No. 39 in 1919) plus several United States Army Air Service squadrons (9th, 50th, 174th, and a detachment of 43rd).

Flying training continued at RAF Grantham during the inter-war years; Nos 100 and 39 Squadrons were present for much of the 1920s. No. 3 Group RAF was disbanded on 12 April 1926 at Spitalgate by renumbering it No. 23 (Training) Group. The station was back under the administration of No. 3 Group from July - September 1937 after which it was transferred to No. 5 Group RAF (September 1937 - August 1938) after which the station was placed under care & maintenance (it was mothballed). It was reopened in July 1938 and No. 12 Flying Training School RAF moved in on 1 December 1938, possibly with additional 12 FTS elements at the satellite station at RAF Harlaxton.

RAF Spitalgate should not be confused with HQ of No. 5 Group that was in a large private house, St Vincents Hall, Grantham from October 1937 to November 1943 and also known as RAF Grantham during its final years there. Also in November 1943, elements of the HQ IX Troop Carrier Command of the United States Army Air Forces were relocated to RAF Spitalgate, with their headquarters at St. Vincents in the town centre. The station was also the training and point-of-departure for the Polish 1st Independent Parachute Brigade during Operation Market Garden.

The station was an Officer Cadet Training Unit in the 1950s. Much later it became the Women's Royal Air Force (WRAF) Depot, responsible for the recruitment and training of all non-commissioned females in the RAF, until this moved to RAF Hereford and later again to RAF Swinderby. It was also the home of the Central Gliding School which moved to RAF Syerston in March 1975. The site is not part of Grantham, but the parish of Londonthorpe & Harrowby Without.

Spitalgate acted as a parent station for a relief landing ground four miles further south at RAF Harlaxton from November 1916 until 1945.

In 1975 the RAF vacated the site and the following year it became a British Army installation, renamed Prince William of Gloucester Barracks.

== Station commanders ==
- Wing Commander George Reid (1925 to 1927)
- Felicity Hill (1960 to 1962)
- Group Officer Betty Parker (1962 to 1964)
- Group Officer Kay Bright (1964 to 1966)
- Joy Tamblin (1971 to 1974)
