= Jean Conan Doyle =

Women's Royal Air Force officer (1912 – 1997)

Dame Jean Conan Doyle DBE, AE, ADC
- Dame Jean Conan Doyle in the uniform of an Air Commandant of the Women's Auxiliary Air Force, 1963
- Born: Lena Annette Jean Conan Doyle; 21 December 1912
- Died: 18 November 1997 (aged 84)
- Burial place: All Saints Church, Minstead, New Forest
- Other name: Lady Bromet
- Education: Granville House, Eastbourne
- Spouse: Sir Geoffrey Rhodes Bromet (m. 1966)
- Relatives: Arthur Conan Doyle (father)
- Military career
- Allegiance: United Kingdom
- Branch: Women's Auxiliary Air Force (WAAF); Women's Royal Air Force (WRAF)
- Rank: Air Commandant
- Nickname: Billy
- Known for: Women's Royal Air Force officer; literary executor of Sir Arthur Conan Doyle
- Conflicts: World War II (intelligence work)
- Awards: Dame Commander of the Order of the British Empire (DBE); Officer of the Order of the British Empire (OBE); Air Efficiency Award (AE)
- Other work: Literary executor for her father's estate

Air Commandant Dame Lena Annette Jean Conan Doyle, Lady Bromet, DBE, AE, ADC (21 December 1912 – 18 November 1997) was a British Women's Royal Air Force officer.

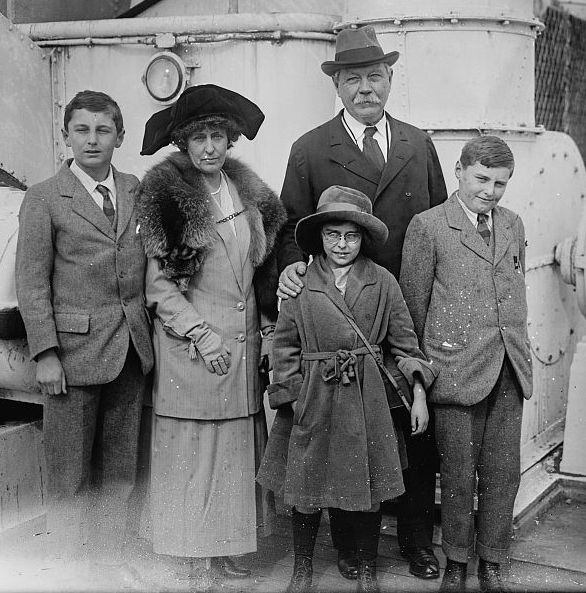
Jean with her parents and brothers on board the RMS Olympic on 5 April 1923

The second daughter of Sir Arthur Conan Doyle, she was brought up at her parents' country house, Windlesham, in Crowborough, Sussex. A spirited child, with two older brothers, she was described as a tomboy by Harry Houdini. Her childhood nickname was "Billy", and letters to her father would be signed "Your loving son". On her tenth birthday, however, she announced that she had decided to be a girl after all. She then went to her Aunt Ida's school, Granville House in Eastbourne, Sussex, where she took after her mother in developing a love of nature. As a schoolgirl she was a classmate and friend of Joan Boniface Winnifrith, who would become film and television actress Anna Lee. Winnifrith was Sir Arthur Conan Doyle's god-daughter.

== Career ==
She attended school at Granville House, Eastbourne, and went on to serve for thirty years in the Women's Auxiliary Air Force (WAAF), where she worked in intelligence during World War II. Commissioned a section officer, she was promoted to temporary flight officer on 1 February 1942 and to temporary squadron officer on 1 July 1944.

On 19 June 1947, Acting Wing Officer Conan Doyle was granted a short-service commission as a flight officer in the WAAF, G Branch, with seniority from 26 September 1943. She was appointed OBE (Military Division) in the 1948 New Year Honours, she was granted a permanent commission as a wing officer in the secretarial branch of the renamed Women's Royal Air Force (WRAF) on 1 February 1949.

She was promoted to group officer on 1 January 1952. On 1 April 1963, she was promoted to air commandant, the highest rank in the Women's Royal Air Force. On 29 April of the same year, she was appointed an honorary Aide-de-Camp to Queen Elizabeth II, serving until 1966.

In the 1963 Birthday Honours, she was elevated to Dame Commander of the Order of the British Empire (DBE, Military Division), and was known as Dame Jean Conan Doyle. On 11 May 1966, she retired from the WRAF. She gained the additional style Lady Bromet upon marrying Air Vice-Marshal Sir Geoffrey Rhodes Bromet (1891–1983). Her husband served a term as Lieutenant-Governor of the Isle of Man; the couple had no children.

== Literary estate ==
Upon the death of her brother, Adrian, in 1970, Dame Jean became her father's literary executor and the legal copyright holder to some of the rights to the Sherlock Holmes character as well as her father's other works. She assiduously defended Sherlock Holmes' character. She and her brothers, Adrian and Denis Conan Doyle, Arthur Conan Doyle's children by his second wife (Jean, Lady Conan Doyle) inherited the copyrights with the estate when their mother died in 1940.

Dame Jean said that Sherlock Holmes was her family's curse because of the fighting over copyrights. She and the widows of her brothers initially shared control of Sir Arthur Conan Doyle's literary trust; however, the women did not get along. Denis Conan Doyle had married a Georgian princess known as Princess Nina Mdivani and died in 1955.

Using a loan from the Royal Bank of Scotland (RBS), in 1970 Princess Nina bought the estate and established Baskervilles Investments Ltd. in the Isle of Man. Eventually, the princess fell dramatically behind on the loan, and the RBS ended up with the rights to Sir Arthur Conan Doyle's works. The bank then sold the rights to Lady Etelka Duncan whose former son-in-law, Sheldon Reynolds, produced two series of Sherlock Holmes adaptations in the 1950s and 1990s. His ex-wife, Lady Duncan's daughter, administered the Sir Arthur Conan Doyle Literary Estate until November 2014.

Conan Doyle Estate Ltd., a privately owned UK company formed in 2005, claims that Dame Jean regained some of the US rights following the passage of the Copyright Act of 1976, although all works of Arthur Conan Doyle's published after 1 November 1925 remain with the Sir Arthur Conan Doyle Literary Estate, which sued the Executors of the Dame Jean Conan Doyle Estate for infringement of copyright. When Warner Brothers made Sherlock Holmes, released in 2009, the studio was granted a licence in 2006 by the Sir Arthur Conan Doyle Literary Estate and ended up signing a "Covenant not to Sue" a year later with Conan Doyle Estate Ltd.

== Death ==
At her death at age 84, Dame Jean's will stipulated that any remaining copyrights she owned were to be transferred to the Royal National Institute for the Blind. According to a 1990 interview, Dame Jean's eyesight was poor from an early age. The National Institute for the Blind sold the rights back to the Conan Doyle heirs. (As of 2015 there were eight surviving Conan Doyle heirs. None is a direct descendant, as neither Jean nor her brothers had any children.)

On her death her cremated ashes were interred with those of her husband and his first wife in the churchyard of All Saints Church at Minstead in the New Forest, near to where her parents had been reinterred in 1955, their remains having been transferred from the grounds of their home in Crowborough.

== Sources ==
- Biography, ash-nyc.com; accessed 23 March 2014.

== Media ==
External image
- Portrait in oils of Air Chief Commandant Dame Jean Conan Doyle
