= Gustav Sprick =

German World War II flying ace (1917–1941)

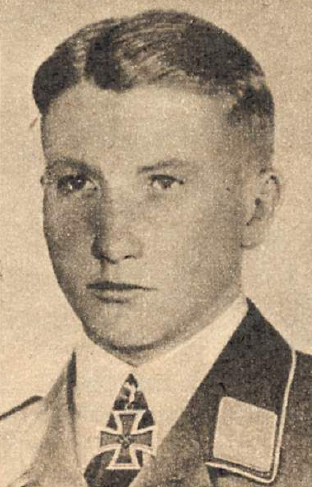
- Born: 29 November 1917; Biemsen, German Empire
- Died: June 28, 1941 (aged 23); Holque, France
- Burial place: Bourdon German war cemetery, France
- Military career
- Allegiance: Nazi Germany
- Branch: Luftwaffe
- Service years: 1935–1941
- Rank: Oberleutnant (first lieutenant)
- Nickname: "Micky"
- Unit: JG 26
- Conflicts: See battles World War II: Battle of France; Battle of Britain
- Awards: Knight's Cross of the Iron Cross

Gustav "Micky" Sprick (29 November 1917 – 28 June 1941) was a Luftwaffe fighter ace and squadron leader during World War II. He is credited with 31 victories in 192 missions. All his victories were claimed over the Western Front.

Born in Biemsen, Sprick was posted to Jagdgeschwader 26 "Schlageter" (JG 26—26th Fighter Wing) in September 1939 and claimed his first aerial victory on the first day of the Battle of France. In August 1940, Sprick was appointed Staffelkapitän (squadron leader) of 8. Staffel of JG 26. He was awarded the Knight's Cross of the Iron Cross on 1 October after gaining his 20th aerial victory. On 28 June 1941, Sprick was killed in action when his Messerschmitt Bf 109 lost its wing due to structural failure.

== Early life and career ==
Sprick, who was born on 29 November 1917 in Biemsen, at the time in the Principality of Lippe. After completing his pilot-training, Fähnrich Sprick was posted to Jagdgeschwader 26 "Schlageter" (JG 26—26th Fighter Wing) on 23 September 1939, and assigned to 8. Staffel (8th squadron), a squadron of III. Gruppe (3rd group). (Note: For an explanation of Luftwaffe unit designations see Organization of the Luftwaffe during World War II.) JG 26 was named after Albert Leo Schlageter, a martyr cultivated by the Nazi Party. At the time, 8. Staffel was under the command of Oberleutnant Eduard Neumann and III. Gruppe was headed by Major Ernst Freiherr von Berg.

== World War II ==
World War II in Europe had begun on Friday 1 September 1939 when German forces invaded Poland. During the campaign against France, JG 26 was controlled by Jagdfliegerführer 2, Oberst Kurt-Bertram von Döring, and was deployed on the right flank of Luftflotte 2 (Air Fleet 2), supporting the attack of Army Group B against the Netherlands. On 10 May 1940, the opening day of Fall Gelb (the invasion of the West), the now Leutnant Sprick shot down his first enemy aircraft: a Dutch Fokker T.V twin-engined bomber, over Breda in the Netherlands. The next day, III. Gruppe attacked a formation of Curtiss Hawk Model 75A fighters from Groupe de Chasse I/4 (GC—fighter group) over the Antwerp-Breda road. The Gruppe claimed five Curtiss fighters destroyed, including Sprick's second aerial victory. On 17 May, III. Gruppe transferred to Saint-Trond and Sprick claimed a Morane-Saulnier M.S.406 near Grammont.

Having scored nine victories by the fall of France, he had been promoted to Oberleutnant. He was shot down however, on 14 June near Évreux, by RAF (Royal Air Force) Hurricane fighters after claiming one of their number. But he managed to crash-land uninjured and was rescued by German troops.

=== Squadron leader ===
On 8 August 1940, Sprick was appointed Staffelkapitän (squadron leader) of 8. Staffel of JG 26, replacing Oberleutnant Kuno Wendt. His Gruppe, III./JG 26 had a formidable team of leaders during the Battle of Britain, with the experienced Kommandeur Adolf Galland and Gerhard Schöpfel (9. Staffel), with Sprick (8. Staffel) and Joachim Müncheberg (7. Staffel). These four pilots all had 10 or more victories and over the next 2 months claimed 50 aircraft between them.

Sprick himself scored 11 victories in the battle, including a pair of Hurricanes of 85 Sqn on 31 August (his 14th & 15th victories). He was awarded the Honour Goblet of the Luftwaffe (Ehrenpokal der Luftwaffe) on 8 September, and then the coveted Knight's Cross of the Iron Cross (Ritterkreuz des Eisernen Kreuzes) on 1 October after gaining his 20th victory on 28 September. By the end of 1940, with the battle falling back into a relatively quiet period, his score had increased to 23. (Müncheberg had 23, Schöpfel had 22 and Galland with 58). On 27 November, Sprick claimed an aerial victory over a Spitfire in the vicinity of Deal. According to Mathews and Foreman, this claim is unconfirmed. However, Sarkar states that Sprick shot down Keith Lawrence from No. 421 (Reconnaissance) Flight who was injured in the encounter that day.

June 1941 marked the invasion of the Soviet Union in the east. With the majority of the Luftwaffe involved in Operation Barbarossa, it left just JG 26, JG 2 and JG 1 defending the west. Coinciding with this, the British started their own air offensive, taking the fight to the Germans over France. Now, however, the roles were reversed, and it was the RAF fighters that found themselves vulnerable, operating at the limit of their range.

On 16 June 1941, Sprick claimed his 24th aerial victory. That day, the RAF had attacked Boulogne-sur-Mer with six Bristol Blenheim bombers in "Circus" No. 13. The bombers were escorted by six fighter squadrons from No. 11 Group.

=== Death ===
On 28 June, the RAF flew "Circus" No. 26, with the objective to bomb the electrical power station at Comines. III. Gruppe, led by Schöpfel, was ordered to intercept the "Circus" escorted by No. 303 Polish Fighter Squadron. The 8 Staffel, which was flying the high cover, was jumped from above by Spitfires and in the ensuing melee, the right wing of Sprick's Bf 109 F-2 (Werknummer 5743—factory number) sheared off while he attempted an evasive Split S maneuver. He crashed to his death near Holque, inland from Calais. Sprick is buried in the Bourdon German war cemetery, France in block 38, row 8, grave 305.

== Summary of career ==
=== Aerial victory claims ===
Mathews and Foreman, authors of Luftwaffe Aces — Biographies and Victory Claims, researched the German Federal Archives and found records for more than 30 aerial victory claims, plus five further unconfirmed claims. All of his aerial victories were claimed on the Western Front of World War II.

Chronicle of aerial victories
This and the – (dash) indicates unconfirmed aerial victory claims for which Sprick did not receive credit. This and the ? (question mark) indicates information discrepancies listed by Prien, Stemmer, Rodeike, Bock, Mathews and Foreman.
Claim	Date	Time	Type	Location	Claim	Date	Time	Type	Location
– 8. Staffel of Jagdgeschwader 26 "Schlageter" – Battle of France — 10 May – 25 June 1940
1? (Note: According to Mathews and Foreman this claim is unconfirmed.)	10 May 1940	—	Fokker T.V	Breda	—	6 June 1940	—	MB.151	
2	11 May 1940	19:30	Curtiss	northwest of Antwerp	—	6 June 1940	—	MB.151	
3	17 May 1940	18:30	M.S.406	Grammont	—	6 June 1940	—	MB.151	
4	31 May 1940	15:40	Hurricane	Furnes	6	13 June 1940	12:39	Defiant	vicinity of Paris
5	2 June 1940	09:25	Spitfire	Dunkirk	7	14 Jun 1940	17:50	Hurricane	Poix/Abbeville
– 8. Staffel of Jagdgeschwader 26 "Schlageter" – Action at the Channel and over England — 26 June 1940 – 21 June 1941
8	12 August 1940	12:20	Hurricane	northwest of Margate	20	28 September 1940	11:30	Spitfire	Canterbury
9	15 August 1940	12:58	Spitfire	Dover, northwest of Boulogne	21	15 October 1940	13:45	Spitfire	
10	18 August 1940	13:50	Hurricane	Canterbury	22	25 October 1940	14:30	Spitfire	Maidstone
11	24 August 1940	12:20	Hurricane	Ashford	23	17 November 1940	10:22	Spitfire	east of Harwich
12	31 August 1940	19:05	Hurricane	Folkestone	— (Note: This unconfirmed claim is not listed by Prien, Stemmer, Rodeike and Bock.)	27 November 1940	09:35	Spitfire	Deal
13	31 August 1940	19:15	Hurricane	Folkestone	24	16 June 1941	16:35	Spitfire	Dungeness
14	1 September 1940	15:05	Hurricane	London	25	17 June 1941	19:42	Hurricane	north Étaples
15	3 September 1940	11:10	Spitfire	Rochester	26	17 June 1941	19:58	Hurricane	Dover Strait
16	6 September 1940	10:10	Spitfire	southwest of Dungeness	27	18 June 1941	18:20? (Note: According to Mathews and Foreman claimed at 16:20.)	Spitfire	Pas-de-Calais
17	11 September 1940	19:30	Hurricane	Canterbury/Ashford	28	21 June 1941	16:42	Hurricane	west of Boulogne
18	17 September 1940	16:35	Spitfire	Gravesend	29	21 June 1941	16:55	Spitfire	20 km (12 mi) west-northwest of Boulogne
19	23 September 1940	10:35	Spitfire	Thames Estuary					
– 8. Staffel of Jagdgeschwader 26 "Schlageter" – Action at the Channel and over England — 22–28 June 1941
30	22 June 1941	16:20	Spitfire	off Gravelines	31	24 June 1941	20:58	Spitfire	off Gravelines

=== Awards ===
- Iron Cross (1939) 2nd and 1st Class
- Honour Goblet of the Luftwaffe (8 September 1940)
- Knight's Cross of the Iron Cross on 1 October 1940 as Leutnant and pilot in the 8./Jagdgeschwader 26 "Schlageter" (Note: According to Scherzer as pilot in the III./Jagdgeschwader 26 "Schlageter".)
