= Maidstone Airport =

Maidstone Airport may refer to a number of airports

== Current ==
- Maidstone Aerodrome Canada

== Defunct ==
- Maidstone Airport, Kent, United Kingdom
