= Donald McKay (RAF officer) =

British flying ace of WWII

- Born: 1917; Pontefract, Yorkshire, United Kingdom
- Died: 1 October 1959 (aged 41–42)
- Military career
- Allegiance: United Kingdom
- Branch: Royal Air Force
- Service years: 1939–1947
- Rank: Flight Lieutenant
- Units: No. 501 Squadron; No. 421 Flight; No. 91 Squadron; No. 234 Squadron
- Conflicts: Second World War: Battle of France; Battle of Britain; Circus offensive; North African campaign
- Awards: Distinguished Flying Medal & Bar

Donald McKay, DFM & Bar (1917 – 1 October 1959) was a flying ace who served in the Royal Air Force (RAF) during the Second World War. During his service with the RAF, he was credited with having destroyed at least fourteen German aircraft although this total may be understated.

From Pontefract, McKay joined the Royal Air Force Volunteer Reserve (RAFVR) in 1937. He was training with the RAF at the time of the outbreak of the Second World War and was posted to No. 501 Squadron a few days afterward. The following May the squadron was sent to France upon the invasion of that country. Flying Hawker Hurricane fighters, McKay shot down several aircraft during the campaign in France and in the following Battle of Britain. He himself was shot down on The Hardest Day, suffering burns as he baled out of his Hurricane. Hospitalised as a result, he did not return to operations until mid-September. Shortly afterwards he was transferred to No. 421 Flight, achieving more victories over the next several months until he was rested in June 1941.

After a period of instructing duties, in January 1942 he was posted to No. 234 Squadron. Later in the year he was sent to the North Africa, serving with several different squadrons and ending the war on instructing duties in Rhodesia. He resumed service with the RAFVR in the postwar period, performing instructing duties at Desford. His wife died in September 1959; grief-stricken, McKay killed himself.

== Early life ==
Donald Alistair Stewart McKay was born in 1917 at Pontefract, in Yorkshire, the United Kingdom. In April 1937, while working in banking, he joined the Royal Air Force Volunteer Reserve (RAFVR) to train as a pilot. The progress of his training at No. 5 Elementary & Reserve Flying Training School at Hanworth was such that in early 1939 he was granted six months of full-time training with the Royal Air Force. He was posted to No. 43 Squadron in February and was transferred to No. 111 Squadron four months later.

== Second World War ==
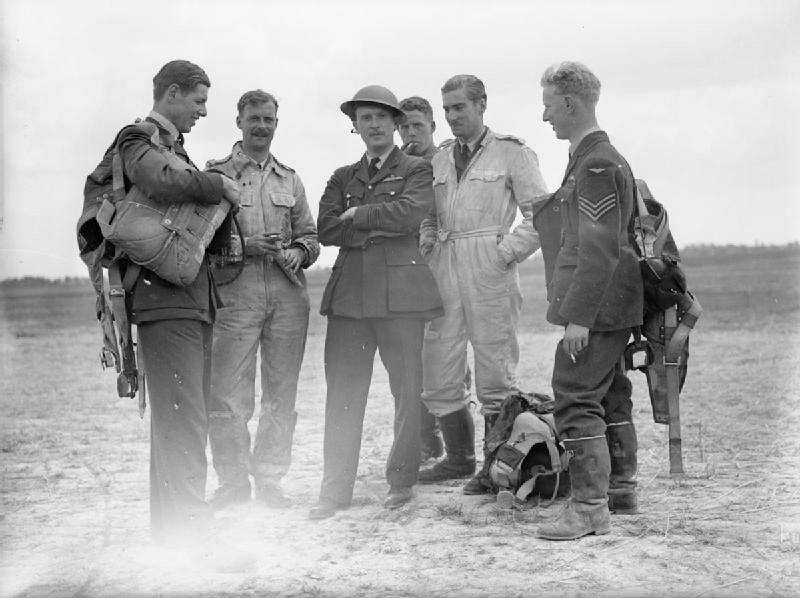
Pilots of No. 501 Squadron in France; McKay stands behind the man wearing the helmet

As the likelihood of hostilities increased, in August McKay's service with the RAF was extended. Upon the outbreak of the Second World War, he was formally called up for duty and posted to No. 501 Squadron. This was a unit of the Royal Auxiliary Air Force that was based at Filton from where it operated Hawker Hurricane fighters as part of Bristol's aerial defence. It saw little action for the first several weeks of the war and in November shifted south east to Tangmere, but here too, there was minimal activity.

=== Battle of France ===
The invasion of France and the Low Countries commenced on 10 May 1940, and No. 501 Squadron was sent to the European continent the same day. Flying from Bétheniville, it was immediately in action. McKay shot down a Heinkel He 111 medium bomber to the south west of Saint-Hubert on 12 May. He destroyed two more He 111s in the area around Blagny on 27 May. On 15 June, with the situation in France deteriorating, the squadron was ordered to return to the United Kingdom. McKay flew a Hurricane that was in poor condition to Tangmere via Caen. In the meantime the squadron deployed to the Channel Islands from where it briefly operated in support of the evacuation of elements of the British Expeditionary Force from Cherbourg, before going onto Croydon.

=== Battle of Britain ===
No. 501 Squadron moved to Middle Wallop in early July and on the 29th of the month, McKay destroyed a Junkers Ju 87 dive bomber to the south of Dover although this was not confirmed. He shot down two Ju 87s on 15 August over Hawkinge. In the early afternoon of 18 August, on what is now known as The Hardest Day, No. 501 Squadron was patrolling near Canterbury, when it was set upon by a group of Messerschmitt Bf 109 fighters. McKay was shot down but, although wounded, was able to bail out. His aircraft was one of seven of the squadron's Hurricanes to be destroyed that day.

McKay was burned in the engagement of 18 August and was hospitalised for treatment; he did not return to the squadron until 12 September. On 21 October, he was posted to No. 421 Flight. This was a special unit based at Hawkinge and, equipped with Supermarine Spitfire fighters, tasked with interception duties along the coast. He damaged a Bf 109 near Ashford on 24 October and shot down a Dornier Do 17 medium bomber to the south of Folkestone on 15 November. In an engagement in the same area on 27 November he destroyed a Bf 109. He claimed the destruction of a Junkers Ju 88 medium bomber south of Dungeness on 17 December. In early January 1941, McKay was awarded the Distinguished Flying Medal (DFM). The published citation read:

This airman has shown fine skill and tenacity in air combat and has carried out valuable reconnaissance duties. He has destroyed at least eight enemy aircraft.

— London Gazette, No. 35037, 7 January 1941

=== No. 91 Squadron ===
Shortly after McKay was awarded the DFM, No. 421 Flight, still based at Hawkinge, was expanded and redesignated No. 91 Squadron. McKay shot down one Bf 109 and damaged a second off Deal on 4 February and a week later damaged another Bf 109, this time over Dover. He destroyed a Do 17 about 15 miles (24 km) south of Folkestone on 6 March. Later that month, McKay was awarded a Bar to his DFM. This was presented to him by King George VI in a ceremony at Buckingham Palace. The published citation read:

This airman has been almost continuously employed in active operations since the war began and has destroyed at least 11 hostile aircraft. He has consistently maintained a high standard of operational efficiency.

— London Gazette, No. 35110, 18 March 1941

By February, in addition to its interception patrols, No. 91 Squadron was also flying on offensive operations to German-occupied Europe as part of the RAF's Circus offensive. On one such sortie, on 30 March McKay damaged a Bf 109 off the coast from Dunkirk, its pilot crash-landing at Étaples. He shot down a Bf 109 near Cap Gris-Nez on 21 April. He destroyed another Bf 109 on 11 May, this time over England. For part of his later service with the squadron, McKay flew a presentation Spitfire, 'Gold Coast I'. In June he was rested from operations and posted to No. 55 Operational Training Unit (OTU) as an instructor. Commissioned as a pilot officer in October, he remained at the OTU until January 1942. At this time he was posted to No. 234 Squadron.

=== Later war service ===
McKay's new unit was based at Ibsley, operating Spitfires on convoy patrols. It was scrambled on 14 February during the Channel Dash and McKay shot down a pair of Bf 109s to the north of Dunkirk. At the end of the month he was transferred to No. 130 Squadron, a Spitfire unit at Perranporth, to serve as one of its flight commanders. His service there was brief, for in April he went to North Africa to join No. 213 Squadron. This was operating Hurricanes from airstrips in Egypt on ground attack duties. Later in the year he was posted to No. 33 Squadron, another Hurricane unit in the Western Desert. In November he was transferred to No. 274 Squadron; this was occupied with coastal patrols, flying from Landing Ground 37. For much of 1943 he served with a Communications Flight and subsequently with a maintenance unit at Aboukir as its test pilot. From January 1944 up until the end of the war in Europe he performed instructing duties in Rhodesia.

== Later life ==
In the postwar period, McKay instructed at No. 7 Elementary Flying Training School (EFTS) at Desford. In 1946 he married Joyce Mary Moore and the couple made their home at Market Bosworth in Leicestershire. He was released from the RAF the following year, having attained the rank of flight lieutenant. He rejoined the RAFVR and resumed his duty as an instructor at No. 7 EFTS. Interested in the history of military aviation, he was a contributor to the book 'Air Aces of the 1914–1918 War', released by Harleyford Publishers in the late 1950s.

In September 1959, McKay's wife took ill with appendicitis. She underwent an operation on 30 September but died the same day. Grief-stricken, McKay committed suicide by taking an overdose of chloroform on 1 October 1959.

McKay is credited with the destruction of fourteen German aircraft, plus one that was unconfirmed, as well as four aircraft damaged. However, it is believed that he may have shot down at least seven more aircraft although the details of all of these aerial victories, three of which being considered unconfirmed, are unavailable.
