= Adrian Francis Laws =

British World War II flying ace

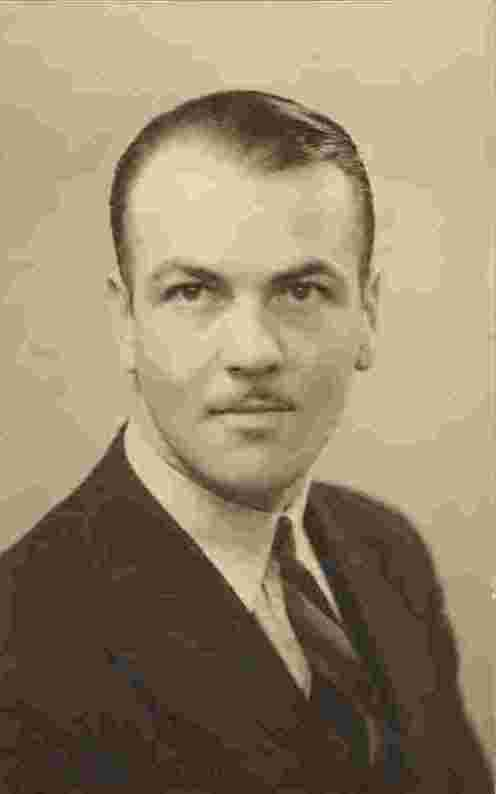
- Born: 10 August 1912; East Dereham, Norfolk, England
- Died: 30 September 1940 (aged 28); Cranswick, Yorkshire, England
- Burial place: Wells-next-the-Sea Cemetery
- Military career
- Allegiance: United Kingdom
- Branch: Royal Air Force
- Service years: 1931–1940
- Rank: Pilot Officer
- Service number: 514143/45092
- Unit: No. 64 Squadron RAF
- Conflicts: Second World War: Battle of Britain
- Awards: Distinguished Flying Medal

Adrian Francis Laws, DFM (10 August 1912 – 30 September 1940) was a Royal Air Force pilot and flying ace during the Battle of Britain. He was killed on 30 September 1940 after colliding with another Spitfire while training new pilots.

== Early life ==
Laws was born in East Dereham, Norfolk, on 10 August 1912 and attended the County Primary School at Wells-next-the-Sea, Norfolk until the age of 14. His parents ran a sweet shop on Staithe Street. His daughter, Susan Mary Laws, was born two weeks after his death. He learned to shoot using a .410 shotgun to hunt rabbits in the fields around Wells-next-the-sea with his classmate Allan Tuck, who named his first son Adrian Francis in memory of his friend.

== Military career ==
Aged 19, Laws enlisted with the Royal Air Force (RAF) in 1931 as an aircrafthand and trained as a storekeeper. He applied and was accepted for pilot training and began flying at No. 4 Flight Training School at RAF Abu Sueir in July 1935. He joined No. 64 Squadron RAF at Ismailia on 20 April 1936, as a sergeant pilot. Equipped with two-seater Demons they were to return to the United Kingdom in September 1936.

By late 1939 Laws was flying Blenheims out of RAF Church Fenton in the Leconfield sector. No. 64 Squadron was then converted to the new Spitfire Mark I, which a nearly promoted flight sergeant Laws then flew.

=== Battle of Britain ===
==== 12 June 1940 ====
Laws first success came on 12 June 1940 while participating in the hunt and destruction of what appeared to be a lone He 111. The Battle of Britain was still in its early days and this is reflected by the length and detail of the combat reports. Later on in the battle a more sanguine Laws is to comment "closed into attack and usual dog-fight ensued". But here, both he and Gilbert describe every twist and turn of the engagement.

The incident also shows the deadly effect of radar and observer tracking. The lone bomber trying to sneak out at zero feet was not allowed to escape. Laws and Gilbert, supposed to fly in section, actually left the ground ten minutes apart. So it was Gilbert who found the raider first and emptied his guns into the enemy aircraft. One engine was damaged and one gunner was killed or injured.

A short time later the He 111 was to become the object of Laws' attention. He hounded the damaged bomber to wave-top height with two passes. While two other Spitfires arrived to take shots at what was now a wallowing enemy, Laws emptied his guns and watched the bomber settle on the water. His reluctance to leave his first kill is evident as he describes circling the plane and seeing the crew inflating their dinghy.

==== 29 July 1940 ====
By this time No. 64 Squadron were being led by Donald MacDonell, a man who would go on to have a distinguished RAF career. He had been heavily involved in the fighting over the convoys on 25 July. He had bagged a Ju 87 Stuka before he himself was badly shot up in combat with a Ju 88 off Dover. MacDonnell however was unhurt and managed to land safely. MacDonell, official head of the Glengarry clan, was to say about his squadron's pilots "...it's like holding a team of wild horses when there are Germans near".

On this day the pilots of No. 64 Squadron found their action amongst the German fighters when they engaged a flight of Messerschmitt Bf 109s over St. Margaret's Bay at eight o'clock in the morning and Laws downed an Bf 109.

==== 11 August 1940 ====
The German's planned "Eagle Day" was cancelled for the second day running due to the cloudy weather that prevailed. In place of this operation the Luftwaffe mounted a "free chase" over Sussex. The formation consisted of more than 30 fighters and the German plan was to draw the RAF interceptors away from bombing raids going into Weymouth and Portland. Four squadrons took the bait and No. 64 Squadron was vectored to intercept the force as it started to make its way home.

The rear section was the first to spot the enemy who had a 5,000 ft (1,524 m) height advantage. It seems the squadron had found about half the retreating force of Bf 109s. There then followed a strange processional attack by the Germans which overshot the 8 Spitfires of No. 64 Squadron who then pounced to their own attack.

The Bf 109 that Laws attacked was on the tail of Blue 1. Assuming the Messerschmitt had some ammunition left, the pilot of Blue 1 had reason to be thankful. It was Pilot Officer Gilbert, who was destined to survive the war. The cloudy conditions meant that none of the aircraft engaged could be confirmed as destroyed.

==== 13 August 1940 – Eagle Day ====
Bomber attacks were directed towards British airfields on this day but a combination of fighter resistance and thick clouds served to foil them.

Also it seems that the bomber crews were suffering from frayed nerves. Laws was a member of "Flight B" when they spotted a formation that they identified as Dornier 215s. The enemy, set on a north-easterly course, needed no more persuasion than the sight of Spitfires to turn and run for home. Once on the run the formation opted simply for speed and wasted no energy on evasion. However, when Laws latched onto his tail one German pilot decided to fight for his life. He led Laws into a series of steep diving turns that challenged both Laws and his Spitfire to keep up. The German, with his rear gunner disabled from the initial attack, may have believed he had done enough to lose his Law's Spitfire and straightened up to dive for cloud. He reached the cloud, but took more hits to the fuselage.

==== 15 August 1940 – The coining of "The Few" ====
The results of the engagements that took place on 15 August 1940 can be seen as a victory for the escorting German fighters in as much as they held back the intercepting British fighters and the bombers pressed home their attack. It also symbolises the courage of the newly christened "Few" as Churchill was to describe them.

Eighty-eight Dornier 17's approached Deal escorted by more than 130 Bf 109s. At least 60 more Bf 109s crossed the Kent coast at Dover. Three airborne squadrons were sent to intercept – 36 British fighters against 278 enemy planes, odds of more than 7–1, fighter-to-fighter odds of 5–1.

It was the 60 Messerschmitts over Dover that were to meet 64 Squadron. The squadron combat report well conveys the swift and dangerous environment of the ensuing battle that raged back across the Channel towards the French coast. MacDonnell waded into four Bf 109s, destroying one before being forced to evade the attack of two more. Gilbert knocked an Bf 109 off the tail of a Spitfire with a devastating five second burst before himself being hit.

Laws bagged his second confirmed Bf 109 with a beam attack as the enemy slowed slightly at the top of a turn. Two more three second bursts into the tail of the diving enemy set the Bf 109 ablaze.

==== 18 August 1940 – The Hardest Day ====
On 18 August 1940 a low level flight of Dorniers from the Luftwaffe's 9th Staffel and another force of Junkers 88s, combined with a higher level bombing group of more Dorniers to completely fox the defences and deal out severe damage to RAF Kenley's airfield.

Laws and Flight Sergeant Gilbert seem to have administered a coup de grace to an unfortunate bomber and added insult to the injury by claiming an He 111. Laws went on from the engagement with the Heinkel to save an unknown Hurricane pilot by shooting down a Messerschmitt Bf 110 from his tail. It was Law's last 'kill'.

== List of air victories ==
Victory No.	Date	Squadron	Enemy aircraft	Notes
0.5	12 June 1940	No. 64 Squadron	Heinkel He 111 shared	
1.5	29 July 1940	No. 64 Squadron	Messerschmitt Bf 109	
Damaged	11 August 1940	No. 85 Squadron	Messerschmitt Bf 109	
Damaged	13 August 1940	No. 64 Squadron	Dornier 17	
2.5	14 August 1940	No. 64 Squadron		
3.5	15 August 1940	No. 64 Squadron	Messerschmitt Bf 109	
4 & 5	18 August 1940	No. 64 Squadron	Messerschmitt Bf 110 & Heinkel He 111 shared	

=== DFM citation ===
The King has been graciously pleased to approve the under-mentioned award, in recognition of gallantry displayed in flying operations against the enemy:- Awarded the Distinguished Flying Medal – 514143 Flight Sergeant Adrian Francis Laws – This Airman has taken part in numerous operational flights since May, 1940. He has destroyed five enemy aircraft and damaged another two. His initiative, courage and tenacity have been outstanding.

== Death ==
Law's fatal accident was witnessed by American pilot Art Donahue. His diaries, later published as Tally-Ho! – A Yankee in a Spitfire noted:

I rejoined my squadron several days before my leave expired...I learned that the heroism of some of the boys hadn't gone unrecognised. Three DFCs and one DFM had gone to the squadron... Andy (pseudonym for Laws), who had four confirmed, received the DFM because he was a flight sergeant and not a commissioned officer at the time... He had worked up from the ranks to become an exceptional fighter pilot. He had just been awarded a commission as pilot officer but wasn't living in the officers' mess yet because he hadn't yet purchased his uniform.

Later, Donahue writes:

Next morning Andy (Laws) had to give a group of new pilots some practise flying before we went to the target range; so as I was badly in need of some practise too I went for a little cross-country jaunt in my machine, familiarising myself with our present sector of operations. While I was up I could hear distant voices over the R/T which I knew were those of Andy and the pilots he was flying with. When I heard them plainly I could tell it was usually Andy giving one of the others some order, or coaching them on their flying. I didn't pay much attention to what was being said, but I noticed that when I was returning to the airdrome Control seemed to be calling "Yellow One" and having difficulty in getting a reply.

The leader of Yellow section was Andy, and he wasn't having trouble with his R/T. Percy ran out to meet me as I taxied in, and with agonised face told me, "Andy and Nels have collided and Andy's gone in, and it looks like there isn't much hope!"

There wasn't. After half an hour's dumb sad waiting around the telephone in our pilots' hut we heard the story. His tail had been sheared off and his machine had gone all the way down, tumbling over and over, and for some reason he hadn't bailed out. Nels had managed to land safely at another airdrome, as his machine wasn't badly damaged.

=== The accident ===
The character described as "Nels" in Donahue's account was in fact Sergeant Frederick Fenton Vinyard. This 24-year-old from Birmingham had joined 64 Squadron on 15 September. Laws was flying Spitfire P9564 and Vinyard piloted K9805. Both were acting as a target formation for a section of Spitfires who were carrying out practise fighter attacks. Who were the other pilots is not recorded, but it is known that Sergeant Hopgood, Sergeant Limpenny and Pilot Officer Stanley were new arrivals at 64 Squadron at the end of September. They may well have made up the "attacking section".

Laws and Vinyard were flying at an altitude of 3,000 ft (914 m) when the accident occurred at 10.45. The following is from an Air Ministry and sources quoted by the Ministry were the RAF casualty index and the P file held in archive at Hayes:

Sgt. Vinyard reported that the two aircraft were flying semi-line abreast, semi-echelon starboard and six spans apart. The pilot of K9805 (Vinyard) closed in on P9564 (Laws). Shortly after, the under surface of the starboard mainplane of K9805 struck the top of the rear portion of the fuselage of P9564 and severed it. Immediately after the collision had occurred the entire rear portion of Laws' aircraft broke away and the aircraft went into a fast somersaulting dive and struck the ground, bursting into flames on impact. The aircraft crashed at Cranswick, 4 miles north of Leconfield, killing Laws instantly. Spitfire K9805 (Vinyard) went into a dive, but the pilot managed to gain control and land safely at Driffield airfield.

Exactly how the accident happened is unknown. The following is from another Air Ministry letter written to the author.

On 6 October 1940 Sgt. Frederick Fenton Vinyard was on an operational section patrol with two other Spitfires of 64 Squadron in the vicinity of Flamborough Head. The aircraft entered cloud in poor visibility (10/10ths) and the three aircraft then became separated. This was the last time that Sgt. Vinyard was seen by the other two pilots who both returned safely to base. However, at 15.10 hours a report was received from the Observer Corps that a Spitfire was seen to crash into the sea off Flamborough Head at 14.30 hours. Sgt. Vinyard is still reported as missing.

Vinyard's other two section members on that day were Flying Officer A. J. A. Laing and Pilot Officer Arthur Gerald Donahue.

His body was buried in Wells-next-the-sea Cemetery.
