= Keith Lawrence (RAF officer) =

NZ RAF officer (1919–2016)

Keith Ashley Lawrence
- Born: 25 November 1919; Waitara, New Zealand
- Died: 2 June 2016 (aged 96); Devon, United Kingdom
- Military career
- Allegiance: United Kingdom
- Branch: Royal Air Force
- Service years: 1939–1946
- Rank: Flight Lieutenant
- Conflicts: World War II; Battle of Britain; Siege of Malta
- Awards: DFC

Keith Ashley Lawrence DFC (25 November 1919 – 2 June 2016) was a New Zealand-born British Royal Air Force Officer, who was one of the last surviving members of "The Few".

== Early life ==
Lawrence was born on 25 November 1919 in Waitara, New Zealand. He was educated at Southland Boys' High School between 1933 and 1936 and after leaving school worked for two years at the National Bank of New Zealand in Invercargill. In June 1938 he applied for a four-year short service commission and was provisionally accepted in November. On 1 February 1939 he sailed for the UK aboard the RMS Tainui with a large draft of other candidates.

== Royal Air Force ==
=== Training ===
Lawrence reported for training as a pupil pilot at 10 E & RFTS (Elementary and Reserve Flying Training School), in the west site of RAF Yatesbury, run for the RAF by the Bristol Aeroplane Company. After successful ab initio training on de Havilland Tiger Moths, he was posted to No. 1 Depot, RAF Uxbridge to be commissioned into the RAF, and on 31 May was posted to No. 5 FTS, RAF Sealand for Service training on Airspeed Oxfords.

After completion of Service training on 31 October, he joined the newly formed No. 234 Squadron RAF at RAF Leconfield on 6 November 1939. Initially the Squadron kept up flying hours in Avro Tutors and Miles Magisters. Further training started on 17 December on Bristol Blenheim Mk 1Fs (this type known as the short-nosed Blenheim). At the end of March the Squadron began to convert to Supermarine Spitfire Mk1s and became operational with them on 8 May. From 9 May 1940 Lawrence was sent for a month's training to become the Squadron Navigation Officer, flying Avro Ansons at the School of Air Navigation RAF St Athan, Glamorgan.

=== The Battle of Britain ===
On 30 June he rejoined 234 Squadron which had moved to RAF St Eval, Cornwall. Here the unit's main duties were patrols, scrambles and convoy protection. On 8 July he shared in the destruction of a Junkers Ju 88 – the squadron's first victory. On 12 July he damaged a Ju 88. On 15 August 234 Squadron was posted to RAF Middle Wallop, a part of No. 10 Group RAF flying in defence of Portsmouth, Southampton and other targets along the south coast. As there were fewer raids along the south coast than in the south east, about two-thirds of patrols, scrambles and interceptions undertaken were flown in support of No. 11 Group RAF, as far as Kent. On 24 August he damaged a Messerschmitt Bf 110.

On the afternoon of 7 September the Luftwaffe made its first heavy daylight raid on London. 234 Squadron was amongst those scrambled to intercept the enemy bomber force as it retired. Lawrence damaged a Dornier Do 17 and then joined an attack on a formation of 12 Messerschmitt Bf 109s, one of which he pursued to the coast and shot down. Also on 7 September 234 Squadron lost two important members, its inspirational force, Australian Pat Hughes, who was Lawrence's flight commander, and its CO S/Ldr O'Brian. Two days later, 234 Squadron was posted back to its old base at St Eval to be rested, receive replacement aircraft and train new pilots being posted in from OTUs – Operational Training Units; the squadron had lost 18 Spitfires in 4 weeks fighting. Lawrence did not remain with it, but was posted to No. 603 Squadron RAF at RAF Hornchurch, Essex. This was in line with the policy of Keith Park to hold back up to six experienced pilots when a squadron was being rested, and post them to squadrons still in action. On 15 September he claimed a Bf 109 destroyed and two more damaged, and on 17 September a further Bf 109.

On 8 October 1940 Lawrence was posted to the newly formed No. 421 (Reconnaissance) Flight RAF, initially based at Gravesend, Kent, and subsequently at West Malling, Biggin Hill and Hawkinge. The unit was formed by Winston Churchill and Dowding to operate in the specialised role of making visual observation and reporting on the approach of high-flying fighter sweeps, and acquired the nickname of the Jim Crow Flight. On 23 November he damaged a Bf 110. On 27 November, whilst flying alone on an early morning weather recce over Ramsgate he unsuccessfully attacked 3 Bf 109s from III./JG 26, but was 'bounced' and shot down by the fourth. British records available after the war indicate this was another victory for a leading Luftwaffe ace, Gustav Sprick. (Oblt. Gustav Sprick Staffelkapitän 8/JG 26, Spitfire at 09.25 Deal. This was most likely Sprick's 23rd victory. However, from German records, it is unknown if this claim was confirmed.) One wing was blown off Lawrence's Spitfire, and he found himself falling in his stocking feet with his right arm useless. He managed to deploy his parachute and went into the sea. He was spotted and picked up by a lifeboat. Taken to Ramsgate, he was admitted to hospital with a fractured right leg, a lacerated left leg and dislocated right shoulder. He was then transferred to RAF hospital at RAF Halton where he met his future wife Kay.

=== The Siege of Malta ===
On 4 December 1941, after rehabilitation at the RAF Officers' Hospital Torquay, Lawrence rejoined his unit, by then re-numbered as No. 91 Squadron RAF. He was posted to 52 OTU, RAF Aston Down for a refresher course on Spitfires and rejoined the squadron on 10 January 1942. Soon afterwards he was posted to RAF HQ Mediterranean at Valletta, to join the defence of the island during the Siege of Malta. Lawrence joined No. 185 Squadron RAF at Hal Far on 17 February. The defending Hurricanes were considerably outnumbered by enemy fighters escorting the bombers and were slower and less well-armed than the German cannon-equipped Bf 109Fs. Malta was the most heavily bombed place on earth in World War 2. (See external link below). During April there were an estimated 3547 bomber sorties over Malta, with only two days without bombing. Whilst Lawrence was on the island, it was regarded as normal for the squadron to be scrambled two or three times a day in response to raids by anything from 20 to 100+ aircraft. However, this was dependent upon two factors, the serviceability of aircraft – arising from both battle damage and from damage to aircraft on the ground from bombing and strafing – and the serviceability of the runway due to bomb damage. Prior to the arrival of its Spitfires, on several days in April and early May the squadron could only muster 3 or 4 serviceable Hurricanes for scrambles.

On 17 March Lawrence was promoted to Flight Lieutenant. On 23 March he shared a Heinkel He 111, on 9 April damaged a Ju 88 and on 24 April damaged a Bf 109. On 9 May, the day on which the Squadron received its first consignment of Spitfire Mk Vb's, Lawrence destroyed one of the Junkers Ju 87 Stukas which was dive-bombing Grand Harbour, Luqa and defence gun positions. On 10 May he destroyed another of the Stukas this time dive-bombing the Welshman, a fast minelayer now tied up at the jetty at Grand Harbour which had arrived at dawn, but which had been converted for carrying badly needed cargo including fighter fuel, ammunition, spare engines, air crew and a large amount of mail. On 19 May Lawrence damaged a Bf 109. On 28 May he was made Acting Squadron Leader and took command of 185 Squadron, leading the squadron until he was posted back to the UK on 27 June. Following this, he was awarded the Distinguished Flying Cross (gazetted on 12 September 1942) the citation stating "This officer has displayed great courage and outstanding keenness. His example at all times, especially when the odds were great, has been of the best" and crediting him with four destroyed, two probable and seven damaged.

=== Operational Training Units ===
In August 1942 Lawrence began a long period as an instructor when he was again posted to 52 OTU at Aston Down, preparing pupils for operational flying in Spitfire squadrons. On 4 September 1942 he moved to 57 OTU, initially at RAF Hawarden and then at Eshott, on the same duties. In early July 1943 Lawrence went to RAF Duxford for liaison duties with the United States Army Air Forces. flying mainly the Republic P-47 Thunderbolt, the Miles Master and the Piper Cub. On 27 October 1943 he was posted to the Central Gunnery School at RAF Sutton Bridge on the Pilot Gunnery Instructors Training Wing to receive training to become a Spitfire gunnery instructor. (See link to Sutton Bridge for training methods). From 27 December 1943 to 3 May 1944, Lawrence was an instructor at 14 APC at Ayr, where squadrons flew in for two weeks intensive gunnery training. In June 1944 Lawrence was posted to 28 OTU, RAF Wymeswold where he flew Hawker Hurricanes by day and by night to assist the training of Air Gunners flying in Vickers Wellington bomber by making simulated attacks. He was subsequently posted to 18 OTU at Worksop on similar duties until the end of January 1945.

=== 124 (F.B.) Squadron ===
On 5 February 1945 Lawrence returned to operations when he joined No. 124 Squadron, a fighter-bomber squadron. The unit, which transferred to RAF Coltishall on 10 February 1945, flew Spitfire Mk IX.HF(e)'s. The Squadron's main duty was to make dive-bombing attacks on V-2 rocket launching sites around The Hague. Depending on visibility for dive-bombing and the availability of liberated airfields in Belgium for refuelling, each aircraft carried either a 500 or a 1000 lb. bomb-load. For dive-bombing sorties when the liberated airfields were not available, drop tanks were required for the extra fuel for the out-and-return sorties, reducing the bomb-load to 500lbs. (See link to No. 124 Squadron RAF for more detail on operational sorties). The main danger on these sorties was not enemy fighter defence, but heavy flak along the coast and around the launch sites.

The squadron also flew sorties known as interdictions, attacking railway and supply lines to the V-2 sites, again on an out-and-return basis from Coltishall using drop tanks which were jettisoned on approach to the Dutch coast. A further duty was flying daylight escorts for heavy bombers raiding into Germany.

At the end of April, after Lawrence had flown approximately 50 operational sorties, and following the liberation of the Netherlands by the Allies, 124 Squadron moved to RAF Hutton Cranswick for squadron training. On 15 July, Lawrence transferred to the RNZAF, whilst remaining in 124 Squadron.

On 24 August 1945, 124 Squadron moved to RAF Molesworth, for conversion to the Gloster Meteor, the RAF's first jet fighter. In October the unit transferred to RAF Bentwaters. Lawrence was released from Service on 11 March 1946. He returned to New Zealand in late May 1946 and went into the Reserve in September.

== Later life and death ==
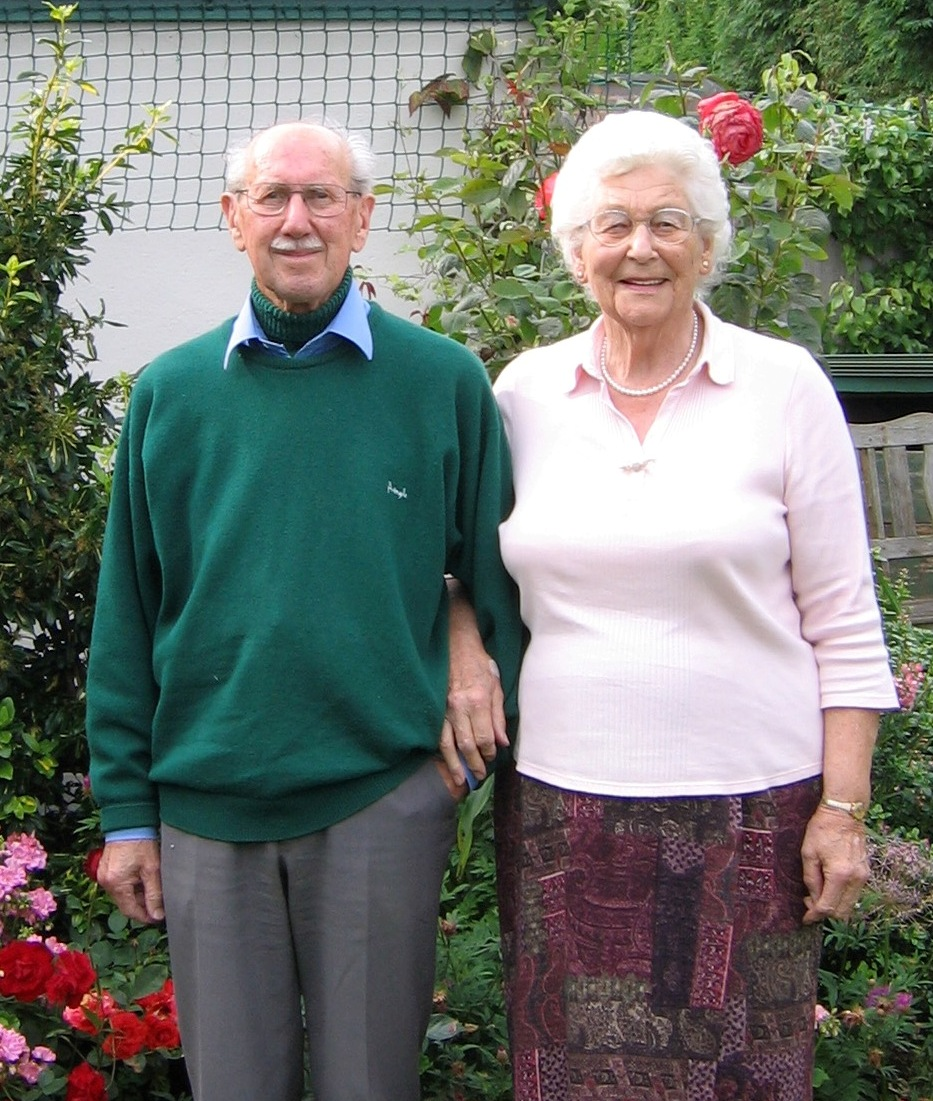
Keith Lawrence and his wife Kay on their Diamond Wedding in 2005.

Lawrence married Kay Harte in 1945 and they had two daughters and three sons. They later returned from New Zealand to Great Britain where he ran retail and commercial enterprises. He retired at age 65 to Devon, where he flew for 18 years with the Devon and Somerset Gliding Club. In 2002, as a part of the Queen's Golden Jubilee celebrations Carolyn Grace invited the Battle of Britain Fighter Association to nominate a member for a flight in The Grace Spitfire. As Lawrence was then still flying, being current on the club's single seaters, he was nominated by the Association and gratefully accepted the invitation for his first Spitfire flight for 57 years.

In 2010, the seventieth anniversary of the Battle of Britain, Lawrence was invited to represent 'The Few' by filming a short sequence with the BBC (see External Link below) at the Battle of Britain Memorial, Capel-le-Ferne on the Kent coast for inclusion in the Festival of Remembrance at the Royal Albert Hall on 13 November.

Lawrence died at his home on 2 June 2016, aged 96.
