= RAF West Malling =

Former Royal Air Force station, West Malling, Kent, England

RAF West Malling
- Near West Malling, Kent in England
- PORTAM CUSTODIMUS (We Guard the Gate)

Site information
- Type: Royal Air Force station
- Code: VG
- Owner: Ministry of Defence
- Operator: Royal Air Force
- Controlled by: RAF Fighter Command 1940- * No. 11 Group RAF

Location
- Shown within Kent RAF West Malling (the United Kingdom)
- Coordinates: 51°16′16″N 000°24′09″E
- Grid reference: TQ680555

Site history
- Built: 1930
- In use: 1930 - 1969
- Battles/wars: European theatre of World War II; Cold War

Airfield information
- Identifiers: IATA: ~~WEM~~, ICAO: ~~EGKM~~
- Elevation: 94 metres (308 ft) AMSL
Runways
Direction	Length and surface
00/00	Sommerfeld Tracking & Concrete
00/00	Sommerfeld Tracking & Concrete

Royal Air Force West Malling or more simply RAF West Malling is a former Royal Air Force station located 1.6 miles (2.6 km) south of West Malling, Kent and 5.2 miles (8.4 km) west of Maidstone, Kent, England.

Originally used as a landing area during the First World War, the site opened as a private landing ground and in 1930, then known as King Hill, home to the Maidstone School of Flying, before being renamed West Malling Airfield, and, in 1932, Maidstone Airport.

During the 1930s many airshows and displays were held by aviators such as Amy Johnson and Alan Cobham, flying from a grass runway.

As war approached, the airfield was taken over by the military, to become RAF West Malling in 1940, serving in the front line against the Luftwaffe. The station saw further service after the war, first with some of the RAFs first jet squadrons, and later as a US Naval Air Station.

After closure as an operational air station in the 1960s, West Malling acquired a more civilian guise, hosting several major Great Warbirds Air Displays during the 70s and 80s, until eventually closing completely as an airfield. The site is now occupied by Kings Hill, a community of mixed residential, commercial, and civic amenities, but still retains several features of its military aviation heritage.

== First World War ==
The airfield was as a landing area during the First World War.

== Second World War ==
RAF West Malling was not fully operational during the Battle of Britain, having suffered from several damaging bombing raids, but did play an active part in the later stages of the air campaign, becoming a premier night-fighter base.

Maidstone Airport was taken over in the prelude to the Second World War, and the RAF station was formed in June 1940, now with a concrete runway. Designated as one of two RAF Fighter Command stations assigned to C Sector, and designated as an advanced aerodrome for RAF Kenley and RAF Biggin Hill. The first aircraft arrived on 8 June 1940. These were Lysanders of No. 26 (Army Cooperation) Squadron, used for photo-reconnaissance sorties over occupied Europe. No. 51 Wing RAF arrived at the same time, and the airfield was provided with anti-aircraft and searchlight batteries for airfield defence.

=== Battle of Britain July 1940 ===
On 12 July, No. 141 Squadron arrived from RAF Turnhouse, Scotland, equipped with Defiant Mk.1 turret-fighters. The squadron's first engagement with the enemy occurred a week later, when 6 out of 9 Defiants were destroyed by a superior force of Me.Bf 109s over the Channel. The three surviving aircraft were rescued only when the fight was joined by Hurricanes from No. 111 Squadron. The remainder of the unit returned north to RAF Prestwick on 25 July due to the ineffectiveness of the Defiant against single-seat fighters.

=== Dambuster, April 1941 ===
No. 29 Squadron flying Bristol Beaufighters arrived for its first tour of duty on 27 April 1941. One of the Squadron's pilots, Guy Gibson VC, later officer commanding 617 Squadron on the Dambusters Raid, said of the station "Of all the airfields in Great Britain ... we have the most pleasant".

A regular and long-standing inhabitant, 29 Sqn. left for the last time on 25 November 1950.

=== Beaufighters 1942 ===
In September 1942 Squadron Leader Cathcart Wight-Boycott was promoted to Acting Wing Commander and posted to RAF West Malling as Officer Commanding 29 Squadron who were still flying Bristol Beaufighters. Between December 1942 and January 1943 Wight-Boycott took the additional temporary role of Station Commander at West Malling.

=== German Landing, April 1943 ===
On a misty evening on 16 April 1943 a single-engined aircraft was heard approaching the airfield by the crew of a Beaverette Mk III armoured car of 2769 Field Squadron RAF Regiment, which was on routine patrol around the airfield. The plane, a German Focke-Wulf Fw 190 fighter, circled twice then landed. The driver of the armoured car, AC Wilding immediately swung his vehicle into the path of the aircraft to prevent it from taking off again. With no means to escape, the pilot, Feldwebel Otto Bechtold, immediately gave himself up. Driving back to the airfield from the Guardroom, they saw a second Focke-Wulf Fw 190 land, but before the armoured car could reach it, the pilot realised his mistake and turned his aircraft round to begin a take-off run. The car commander, LAC Sharback, at once opened fire with his twin Vickers machine guns and the aircraft slewed off the runway and caught fire. The pilot, wounded in the shoulder and leg and with his flying suit in flames, was thrown clear of the aircraft as it overturned. The two gunners ran to the pilot's rescue, extinguished his burning clothing and dragged him clear of the aircraft. Unfortunately, when one of the Station's fire trucks was attempting to extinguish the flames, the aircraft exploded in a ball of fire, scattering debris over a radius of 300 yards and seriously injuring several of the RAF Firemen. Within a few minutes, a third Fw 190 crashed on the approach to the runway and a fourth aircraft ploughed into a nearby orchard and burst into flames.

The serviceable aircraft was flown to Royal Aircraft Establishment at Farnborough the next day for detailed examination, and was eventually repainted in RAF livery, designated as a prototype or experimental aircraft.

The German pilots revealed that they had become lost in thick fog over the English Channel, believed they were over France, and had been directed to the airstrip by a searchlight at Detling.

=== Doodlebugs, 1944 ===
From 20 June to 21 July 1944, No. 322 (Dutch) Squadron RAF, equipped with Spitfire Mk XIVs was stationed at West Malling, tasked with intercepting VI "doodlebug" flying bombs launched from the Dutch and French coasts towards London.

== After the war ==
=== Night fighters, 1950s and 1960s ===
In use throughout the 1950s and early 1960s as Britain's premier night fighter station.

=== United States Navy until 1967 ===
RAF West Malling then became home to several squadrons of the US Navy, until 1967 including FASRON-200.

=== Care & Maintenance ===
From 1967, it was placed on Care & Maintenance, used by several air-industry related businesses.

In 1964 Shorts Brothers operated out of the airfield with a contract with the RAF to service mainly Chipmunk trainers (later Bulldogs), Vickers Varsity aircraft and various other types. This contract ran at least until the late 1970's.

In March 1965, Air Cadet 618 VGS (Volunteer Gliding School) moved to West Malling from RAF Manston, setting up its headquarters in the old dispersal area near the runway threshold. Its aircraft (cable-launched Vanguard TX1 gliders) and equipment were stored into one of the large T.2 Type hangars where they remained until 1992.

From the late 1980s to the early 1990s, new build Saab 340 were sent to an aircraft finishing company (Metair), established here, routing via London Southend Airport, in order to be sprayed into the colour schemes of customer airlines.

== Civilian use ==
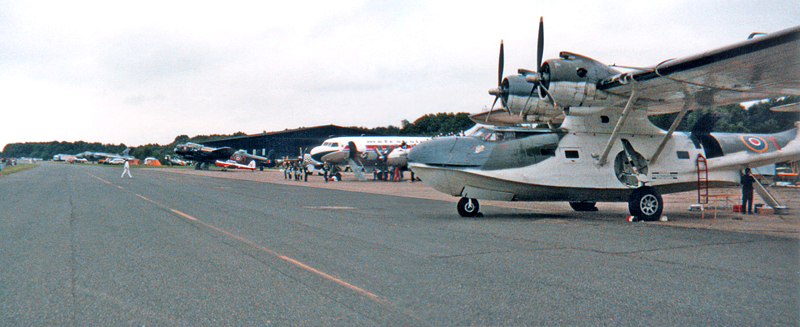
A line-up of aircraft at the Great Warbirds Air Display at RAF West Malling, in August 1987.

In September 1967, the airfield and its larger hangars were the site of filming for extended scenes in The Beatles' film Magical Mystery Tour.

Following the issue by Idi Amin of Uganda 4 August 1972, of a decree ordering the expulsion of the 60,000 Asians who were not Ugandan citizens, around 30,000 of those with British passports emigrated to Britain. The unused accommodation blocks at the airfield were converted for use as temporary homes throughout 1973 until the refugees were resettled around the country. Other RAF stations involved in this exercise were RAF Honington and RAF Stradishall, both in Suffolk.

== Development ==
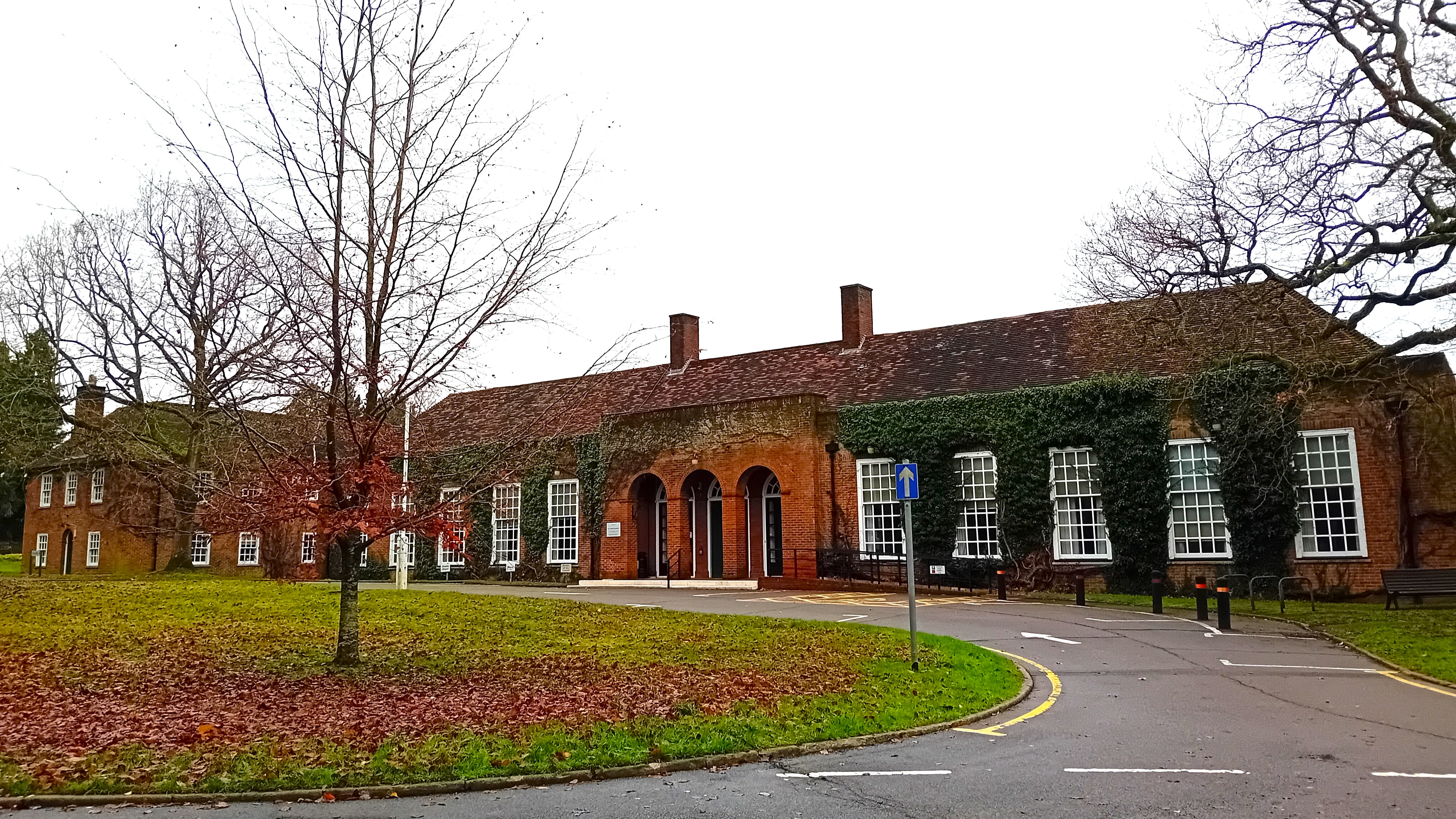
Gibson Building: Former Officers' Mess, headquarters of Tonbridge and Malling Borough Council since 1974.

RAF West Malling is now the site of Kings Hill, a mixed development of residential and business developments, including over 2,000 homes, two schools, local retail units and 18-hole golf course.

The former Officers' Mess (now the Gibson Building, and used as Tonbridge and Malling Borough Council offices) was built in 1939, and is now a Grade II listed building. It was bought by the council in 1974 and converted to become their offices. The building has been substantially extended since, with the 1939 Officers' Mess now used as the Council Chamber. A common layout was used at all RAF stations, so that visiting officers were able to find their way around easily.

The brick-built building still shows remnants of the painted camouflage pattern used during the war.

A number of H-block accommodation buildings are also in use as offices.

The control tower - also listed - is largely complete in the form it was in 1942, now surrounded by modern housing, and has been restored for use as a coffee shop.

Situated near the site of the old guard house, a memorial to the personnel stationed at RAF West Malling was unveiled on 9 June 2002. Otto Bechtold, one of the German Fw 190 pilots who had landed in error in 1943, was a guest of honour at the ceremony.

Road names in Kings Hill pay homage to the site's past use as a RAF aerodrome, with names such as Typhoon Road, Mosquito Road, Hurricane Road, Spitfire Road, Beaufighter Road, Javelin Road, Lancaster Way, Lysander Road, Meteor Road and Mustang Road, and finally Tower View running past the Control Tower.

Kings Hill Cricket Club is located on what was the main runway and the team are known as the Mosquitos. The club's pavilion bar is also known as the hangar. The club badge is the RAF roundels with a Mosquito aircraft. The junior teams are all named after other aircraft that operated out of West Malling.

== Units and aircraft ==
Squadron	Dates	Aircraft	Variant	Notes
No. 3 Squadron RAF	1943	Hawker Tempest	1B	
No. 14 Squadron RAF	1947 & 1948	de Havilland Mosquito	B16 & B35	Based twice.
No. 19 Squadron RAF	1941	Supermarine Spitfire	IIA	Detachments from Fowlmere.
No. 25 Squadron RAF	1947–1951	de Havilland Mosquito	NF10	
No. 25 Squadron RAF	1951–1954	de Havilland Vampire	NF10	
No. 25 Squadron RAF	1954–1957	Gloster Meteor	NF12 & NF14	
No. 26 (South African) Squadron RAF	1940	Westland Lysander	III	
No. 26 (South African) Squadron RAF	1942	North American Mustang	II	Based twice to/from Gatwick.
No. 29 Squadron RAF	1941–1943	Bristol Beaufighter	IF and VIF	
No. 29 Squadron RAF	1944–1950	de Havilland Mosquito	XIII, XX and later NF36	Based on 11 separate periods.
No. 32 Squadron RAF	1942	Hawker Hurricane	I, IIB and IIC	Based three times.
No. 41 Squadron RAF	1944	Supermarine Spitfire	XII	Based for one week.
No. 64 Squadron RAF	1943	Supermarine Spitfire	VC	
No. 66 Squadron RAF	1940	Supermarine Spitfire	I & IIA	
No. 80 Squadron RAF	1944	Supermarine Spitfire	IX	
No. 85 Squadron RAF	1943, 1944, 1947, 1948	de Havilland Mosquito	XII, XVII, NF36	Based four times.
No. 85 Squadron RAF	1948–1957	Gloster Meteor	NF11, NF12 & NF13	
No. 85 Squadron RAF	1959–1960	Gloster Javelin	FAW2, FAW6, FAW8, T3	
No. 91 (Nigeria) Squadron RAF	1944	Supermarine Spitfire	XIV	
No. 91 (Nigeria) Squadron RAF	1946	Supermarine Spitfire	XXI	
No. 96 Squadron RAF	1943–1944	de Havilland Mosquito	XIII	
No. 124 (Baroda) Squadron RAF	1943 & 1944	Supermarine Spitfire	VII	
No. 130 (Punjab) Squadron RAF	1943	Supermarine Spitfire	VB	
No. 133 (Eagle) Squadron RAF	1942	Supermarine Spitfire	VA and VB	Detachments from Kirton-in-Lindsey.
No. 141 Squadron RAF	1940	Boulton Paul Defiant	I	
No. 153 Squadron RAF	1955–1957	Gloster Meteor	NF12 & NF14	
No. 157 Squadron RAF	1944	de Havilland Mosquito	XIX	
No. 234 (Madras Presidency) Squadron RAF	1943	Supermarine Spitfire	VI	
No. 247 (China-British) Squadron RAF	1946	de Havilland Vampire	F1	Based twice.
No. 255 Squadron RAF	1941	Bristol Beaufighter	VIF	Detachments from Coltishall.
No. 264 (Madras Presidency) Squadron RAF	1941–1942	Boulton Paul Defiant	I & II	
No. 274 Squadron RAF	1944	Supermarine Spitfire	IX	
No. 287 Squadron RAF	1945–1946	Supermarine Spitfire	XVI	
No. 316 Polish Fighter Squadron	1944	North American Mustang	III	
No. 322 (Dutch) Squadron RAF	1944	Supermarine Spitfire	XIV	
No. 350 (Belgian) Squadron RAF	1943	Supermarine Spitfire	VC	
No. 409 Squadron RCAF	1944	de Havilland Mosquito	XIII	
No. 410 Squadron RCAF	1943	de Havilland Mosquito	VI	
No. 485 Squadron RNZAF	1942	Supermarine Spitfire	VB	
No. 486 Squadron RNZAF	1942	Hawker Typhoon	IB	
No. 500 (County of Kent) Squadron RAuxAF	1947–1948	de Havilland Mosquito	NF19 & NF30	
No. 500 (County of Kent) Squadron RAuxAF	1948	Supermarine Spitfire	F22	
No. 500 (County of Kent) Squadron RAuxAF	1948–1951	Gloster Meteor	F3	
No. 500 (County of Kent) Squadron RAuxAF	1951–1952	Gloster Meteor	F4	
No. 500 (County of Kent) Squadron RAuxAF	1951–1957	Gloster Meteor	F8	
No. 531 Squadron RAF	1942–1943	Douglas Havoc	I (Turbinlite)	
No. 531 Squadron RAF	1942–1943	Douglas Boston	III (Turbinlite)	
No. 531 Squadron RAF	1942–1943	Hawker Hurricane	IIC	
No. 567 Squadron RAF	1946	Supermarine Spitfire	XVI	
No. 610 (County of Chester) Squadron AAF	1942	Supermarine Spitfire	VB	
No. 616 (South Yorkshire) Squadron AAF	1944	Supermarine Spitfire	VII	

The following units were here at some point:

- No. 1 Air Experience Flight RAF (September 1959 - September 1960)
- No. 51 (Army Co-operation) Wing RAF (June 1940)
- No. 141 Gliding School RAF (June 1949 - October 1951)
- No. 148 Airfield Headquarters RAF (May 1944) became No. 148 (Night Fighter) Wing RAF (May - June 1944)
- No. 421 (Reconnaissance) Flight RAF
- No. 618 Gliding School RAF (January 1965 - 1984) became No. 618 Volunteer Gliding School RAF (1984 - March 1995)
- No. 1452 (Fighter) Flight RAF (July 1941 - January 1943)
- No. 1528 (Beam Approach Training) Flight RAF (April - December 1942)
- No. 2707 Squadron RAF Regiment
- No. 2710 Squadron RAF Regiment
- No. 2766 Squadron RAF Regiment
- No. 2769 Squadron RAF Regiment
- No. 2797 Squadron RAF Regiment
- No. 3203 Servicing Commando
- No. 3208 Servicing Commando
- No. 4085 Anti-Aircraft Flight RAF Regiment
- No. 4186 Anti-Aircraft Flight RAF Regiment
- RAF Central School of Aircraft Recognition (November 1957 - March 1959)

=== In popular culture ===
Several films and TV programmes, including The Beatles' 1967 experimental film Magical Mystery Tour, the 1972 television series Pathfinders and the 1982 television drama series We'll Meet Again, used the airfield as a location during production.

Aerial sequences for an episode of the British TV crime drama Dempsey and Makepeace were filmed here in 1984.

West Malling airfield served as a backdrop for the opening sequences of the 1989 Agatha Christie's Poirot episode "The Incredible Theft".

The 2007 TV series Cape Wrath includes scenes shot at Kings Hill and other local areas.

== See also ==
- Kings Hill
- West Malling
- List of former Royal Air Force stations
