= No. 1452 Flight RAF =

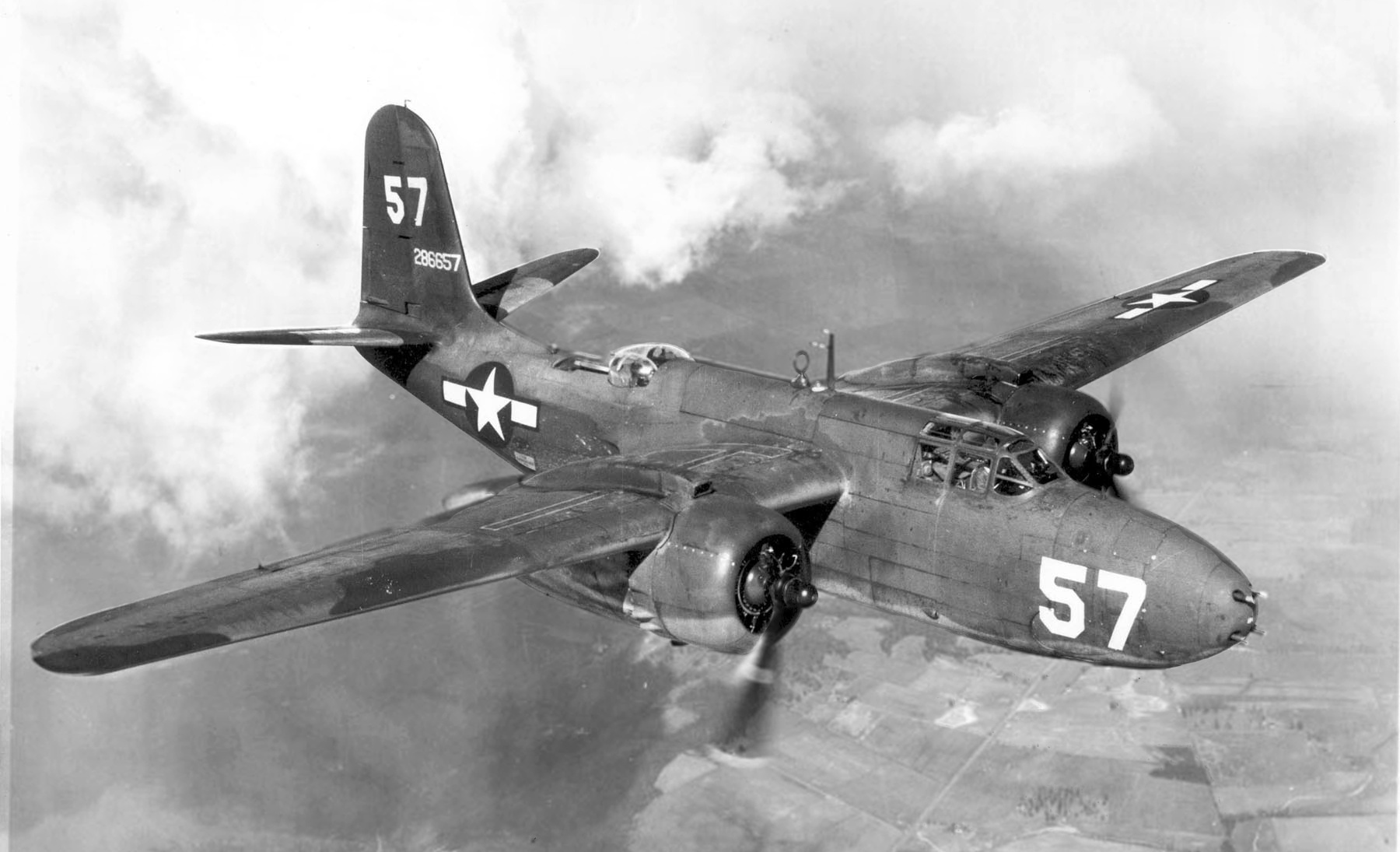
- An A-20 Havoc of the USAAF, like the ones used by the flight
- Active: 7 Jul 1941 – 8 Sep 1942
- Country: United Kingdom
- Branch: Royal Air Force
- Role: Night Fighter (Turbinlite)
- Part of: No. 11 Group RAF, Fighter Command

Insignia
- Squadron Badge heraldry: No known badge
- Squadron Codes: No known identification code for the flight is known to have been carried

No. 1452 (Fighter) Flight was formed at RAF West Malling on 22 May 1941, equipped with Turbinlite Douglas Boston and Douglas Havoc aircraft. On operations they co-operated at first with the Boulton Paul Defiants of 264 Squadron and later with the Hawker Hurricanes of 32 Squadron. The flight was replaced with 531 Squadron on 8 September 1942 (not on 2 September due to administrative reasons) but officially disbanded as late as 22 January 1943.

531 Sqn, which had taken over men and machines, carried on flying the Turbinlite Bostons and Havocs till the system was abandoned on 25 January 1943, when Turbinlite squadrons were, due to lack of success on their part and the rapid development of AI radar, thought to be superfluous.

== Aircraft operated ==
Aircraft operated by no. 1452 Flight RAF, data from
From	To	Aircraft	Version
7 July 1941	8 September 1942	Douglas Havoc	Mk.I (Turbinlite)
7 July 1941	8 September 1942	Douglas Havoc	Mk.I
7 July 1941	8 September 1942	Douglas Havoc	Mk.II (Turbinlite)
7 July 1941	8 September 1942	Douglas Havoc	Mk.II
7 July 1941	8 September 1942	Douglas Boston	Mk.II (Turbinlite)
7 July 1941	8 September 1942	Douglas Boston	Mk.III (Turbinlite)

== Flight bases ==
Bases and airfields used by no. 1452 Flight RAF, data from
From	To	Base
7 July 1941	8 September 1942	RAF West Malling, Kent

== Commanding officers ==
Officers commanding no. 1457 Flight RAF, data from
From	To	Name
7 July 1941	April 1942	S/Ldr. J.E. Marshall, DFC
April 1942	8 September 1942	S/Ldr. G.R. Turner
