= William H. Farrow =

British World War I flying ace

William Hastings Farrow
- Born: 30 March 1893; London, England
- Died: 11 July 1946 (aged 53); London, England
- Military career
- Allegiance: United Kingdom
- Branch: British Army; Royal Air Force
- Service years: c.1916–1919, 1921; 1939–c.1943
- Rank: Wing commander
- Units: No. 47 Squadron RFC; No. 28 Flying Training Squadron RFC; No. 64 Squadron RAF; Far East Air Force
- Conflicts: World War I; Macedonian front; Western Front; World War II
- Awards: Order of the British Empire; Distinguished Flying Cross

Wing Commander William Hastings Farrow OBE, DFC (30 March 1893 – 11 July 1946) was a British World War I flying ace credited with 10 aerial victories. He would pursue a military career well into the 1920s before resigning in 1926. Like many World War I aces, he returned to the military for World War II, and was honoured by induction into the Order of the British Empire.

== World War I ==
Farrow was serving as a corporal in the Royal Engineers, when he was commissioned as a second lieutenant in the Royal Flying Corps on 3 June 1916. On 28 July 1916 he was appointed a flying officer on the General List of the RFC. On 27 December 1916, he scored his first aerial victory while posted to 47 Squadron, serving as part of the British Salonika Army on the Macedonian front. Scoring one of the few wins ever credited to an Armstrong Whitworth F.K.3, he and his observer teamed with another British aircrew to drive a German reconnaissance aircraft down out of control over Hudova.

On 5 April 1917, Farrow was wounded in an engagement with an Albatros Scout. He also knocked down the Albatros, but received no credit for it. Farrow spent from 8 December 1917 until 11 January 1918 posted to 28 Training Squadron. He then transferred to 64 Squadron as a Royal Aircraft Factory SE.5a pilot. Beginning on 11 May 1918, he fought and beat nine German fighter planes in aerial combat. Farrow was appointed a temporary captain on 3 July 1918. By 5 September 1918, he had burned two German fighters, destroyed three, and driven four more down out of control.

His valour won him the Distinguished Flying Cross (DFC), which was gazetted 2 November 1918:

A brilliant fighting Pilot, who never hesitates to engage the enemy, regardless of the latter's numerical superiority. His courage and tenacity sets a fine example to others in his formation. He has led numerous offensive patrols, and has personally destroyed five enemy machines and shot down two others out of control.

== Post World War I ==
On 21 April 1919, Farrow transferred to the unemployed list of the RAF. On 11 April 1921 Farrow returned to active list for temporary duty as a flying officer, being returned to the unemployed list on 5 June 1921.

On 4 September 1923, he was granted probationary commission as a flying officer in the Class "A" Reserves of the RAF. On 4 March 1924, he was confirmed in rank as a pilot officer. On 4 September 1926, he surrendered his commission upon completion of service.

== World War II ==
Farrow returned to serve in World War II; he was commissioned as a probationary flying officer in the Royal Air Force Volunteer Reserve on 9 September 1939. On 22 December 1939, he was appointed as a war substantive flight lieutenant. On 9 September 1940, he was confirmed in rank as a pilot officer. He was promoted from squadron leader to temporary wing commander effective 1 September 1942.

On 1 January 1943, Farrow was appointed an Officer of the Order of the British Empire while serving at the Headquarters of RAF Far East.

== Death ==
On 11 July 1946 Farrow and his Swiss-born wife, Women's Auxiliary Air Force section officer Rita Liliane Elsa Farrow (née Vallotton), were found dead in a room at the Hotel Park, on Bayswater Road, Westminster. A coronial inquest returned a verdict that Farrow, disturbed by marital and financial problems, had shot his wife and then committed suicide.

== List of aerial victories ==
No.	Date/time	Aircraft	Foe	Result	Location	Notes
1	22 December 1916 @ 1030 hours	Armstrong Whitworth F. K. 3 Serial number 5528	Enemy reconnaissance aircraft	Driven down out of control	Hudova	Observer was F. C. Brooks. Shared victory.
2	17 May 1918 @ 1925 hours	Royal Aircraft Factory SE.5a s/n C6458	Fokker Triplane fighter	Destroyed by fire	Lagnicourt	
3	27 May 1918 @ 1100 hours	Royal Aircraft Factory SE.5a s/n C6402	Albatros D.V fighter	Driven down out of control	Cagnicourt	
4	31 May 1918 @ 1940 hours	Royal Aircraft Factory SE.5a	Pfalz D.III fighter	Destroyed	La Bassée	
5	31 May 1918 @ 1942 hours	Royal Aircraft Factory SE.5a	Pfalz D.III	Driven down out of control	La Bassée	
6	21 August 1918 @ 1630 hours	Royal Aircraft Factory SE.5a s/n E5941	Fokker D.VII	Destroyed	Northeast of Douai	
7	22 August 1918 @ 2200 hours	Royal Aircraft Factory SE.5a s/n E5941	Fokker D.VII	Destroyed by fire	Queant	
8	25 August 1918 @ 0900 hours	Royal Aircraft Factory SE.5a s/n E5941	Fokker D.VII	Driven down out of control	Haucourt	
9	2 September 1918 @ 1200 hours	Royal Aircraft Factory SE.5a s/n E5941	Fokker D.VII	Driven down out of control	Aubencheul	
10	5 September 1918 @ 1015 hours	Royal Aircraft Factory SE.5a s/n C1874	Fokker D.VII	Destroyed	Northeast of Cambrai	
