= Jean Maridor =

French flying ace (1920-1944)

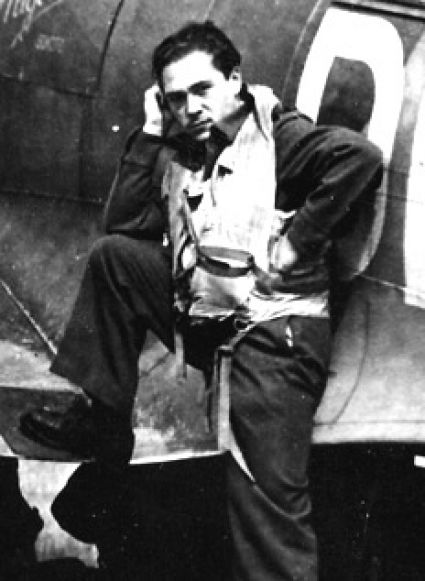
- Born: 24 November 1920; Le Havre, France
- Died: 2 August 1944 (aged 23) †; Benenden, Kent, United Kingdom
- Burial place: Sainte-Marie cemetery, Le Havre
- Military career
- Allegiance: France
- Branch: Armée de l'Air (French Air Force); Royal Air Force
- Service years: 1939–1940 (FAF); 1941–1944 (RAF)
- Rank: Flight Lieutenant (RAF)
- Units: No. 615 Squadron; No. 91 Squadron
- Conflicts: Second World War: Channel Front; Invasion of Normandy; Operation Diver
- Awards: Commander of the Legion of Honour (France); Companion of the Liberation (France); Croix de Guerre (France); Distinguished Flying Cross (United Kingdom)

Jean Maridor, DFC (24 November 1920 – 3 August 1944) was a French-born pilot with the Royal Air Force (RAF) during the Second World War. He is credited with destroying at least three aircraft.

From Le Havre, Maridor joined the Armée de l'Air (French Air Force) in 1939. He had only just completed his training by the time his country surrendered to Germany in June 1940, following the invasion of France. He escaped to the United Kingdom and joined the RAF, being posted to No. 615 Squadron in 1941. Achieving his first aerial victory in October of that year, in February 1942 he was transferred to No. 91 Squadron. He went on to claim several more aerial victories. In the summer of 1944, No. 91 Squadron was involved in Operation Diver, the campaign against German-launched V-1 flying bombs that targeted the south of England. He destroyed several V-1s, and was killed on 3 August when attempting to prevent one from landing on a military hospital in the village of Benenden, in Kent.

== Early life ==
Jean Maridor was born on 24 November 1920 in Le Havre in France and, keen to fly since childhood, took flying lessons as a teenager. Once his formal education was completed, he worked as an apprentice hairdresser while continuing flying and when he was 18, gained his 'A' licence. He joined the Armée de l'Air (French Air Force) in May 1939 and had gained his wings by the time of the outbreak of the Second World War.

== Second World War ==
Maridor's training continued into 1940 and at the time of the invasion of France, he was converting to the Dewoitine D.520 fighter. By this time a caporal (corporal), he was posted to his first operational unit two days prior to the surrender of France. Making his way to Biarritz, he found passage to the United Kingdom aboard a fishing vessel and joined the Royal Air Force (RAF). He underwent training at St Athan and then Odiham before a posting to No. 56 Operational Training Unit (OTU) to gain experience on the Hawker Hurricane fighter. He was then assigned to No. 615 Squadron.

=== Channel Front ===
No. 615 Squadron spent several months based at Valley, the RAF station on Anglesey where it carried out monotonous patrols over the Irish Sea and covered shipping convoys. In the autumn of 1941, it went on the offensive, relocating to Manston and flying sorties to France and Belgium to attack targets of opportunity. On 14 October 1941, Maridor and another pilot intercepted and destroyed a Heinkel He 59 floatplane off Ostend. In the winter months, in resumed patrolling duties over the Irish Sea and also, being based at Angle, the Bristol Channel.

In February 1942 Maridor was commissioned as a pilot officer and posted to No. 91 Squadron. His new unit was based at Hawkinge and operated the Supermarine Spitfire Mk Vb fighter on sorties and sweeps to France and Belgium. It was also engaged in escort duties for Air-Sea Rescue aircraft. On 7 September, Maridor, flying near Ostend, claimed a Junkers Ju 88 medium bomber as probably destroyed. He damaged a Focke-Wulf Fw 190 fighter near Cap Gris-Nez on 26 October and at the end of the month destroyed a Fw 190 and damaged a second over the Dover Straits. On 2 November he claimed a Fw 190 as probably destroyed off Le Touquet. Later in the month he was awarded the Distinguished Flying Cross.

No. 91 Squadron was briefly rested from operations in April 1943 so it could reequip with Spitfire Mk XIIs but resumed operations the following month. Maridor destroyed a Fw 190 over the English Channel on 25 May, one of five claimed by the squadron that day, and shortly afterwards was rested. By this time he has been appointed to the French Order of Liberation as well as the Croix de Guerre and several palms. Promoted to flying officer, he spent time as an instructor at No. 61 OTU, before returning to the squadron in autumn 1943. He destroyed one Fw 190 over Beauvais and damaged a second on 24 September. The squadron's activities was now largely based around flying bomber escort missions and attacking shipping, work which escalated as the invasion of Normandy approached.

=== Operation Diver ===
Shortly after the Normandy landings, the Germans began targeting the south of England with V-1 flying bombs. No. 91 Squadron, now equipped with Spitfire Mk XIVs, were among the fighter squadrons tasked with intercepting these as part of Operation Diver, the RAF's campaign against the V-1s. By 3 August and now a flight lieutenant, Maridor had destroyed ten V-1s. That day, he spotted a V-1 approaching the village of Benenden, in Kent. Realising that it was about to fall on Benenden School, at the time a military hospital, he intercepted it at close range and destroyed it with cannon fire. While this saved the hospital, the exploding V-1 damaged his own aircraft so badly that it crashed into the ground, killing him. He was due to be married to Jean Lambourne, an officer in the Women's Auxiliary Air Force, the following week.

== Legacy ==
Originally buried near London, after the war Maridor's remains were re-interred at the Sainte-Marie cemetery, in Le Havre. A commander in the Legion of Honour, he is credited with having shot down three German aircraft plus a fourth shared with another pilot. He probably destroyed two more aircraft and damaged three others. He is also credited with the destruction of 11 V-1s.

In 1954, a memorial commemorating Maridor's sacrifice was placed at St George's Church in Benenden and a plaque in his honour was unveiled at Benenden School in November 2019, with the daughter of his fiancée present at the ceremony.
