= James O'Meara =

British flying ace

James Joseph O'Meara
- James Joseph O'Meara
- Born: 20 February 1919; Barnsley, Yorkshire, England
- Died: 5 July 1974 (aged 55); Barnstaple, Devon, England
- Military career
- Allegiance: United Kingdom
- Branch: Royal Air Force
- Service years: 1938–1945; 1950–1959
- Rank: Squadron Leader
- Nickname: "Orange"
- Commands: No. 131 Squadron RAF (1943–44)
- Conflicts: Second World War: Battle of Britain
- Awards: Distinguished Service Order; Distinguished Flying Cross & Bar; Mentioned in Despatches

James Joseph "Orange" O'Meara, DSO, DFC & Bar (20 February 1919 – 5 July 1974) was a Royal Air Force officer and fighter pilot of the Second World War. He became a flying ace during the Battle of Britain while flying the Supermarine Spitfire, and by war's end was credited with 11 kills, two shared victories, one unconfirmed destroyed, four probables, 11 damaged and one shared damaged.

== Early life ==
O'Meara was born in Barnsley, Yorkshire, on 20 February 1919. He had an early passion for aviation and worked as a bank clerk in Norwich, Norfolk to earn money to afford flying lessons. He gained a pilot's license No. 15093 at Norfolk & Norwich Aero Club on 19 June 1937 and entered the Royal Air Force on short commission in April 1938 aged 19. actually being commissioned pilot officer on 4 June 1938 and was confirmed as a pilot officer on 4 April 1939. On 18 June he was posted to 9 FTS, RAF Hullavington.

== Wartime service ==
O'Meara's first operational posting was to No. 64 Squadron based at RAF Hornchurch, with which he obtained his first 'kill' while over Dunkirk on 31 May 1940 when he brought down a Bf 109. He had already damaged a Ju 88 off Calais on 21 May. His next claim was a Bf 109 of JG 51, shot down in flames over the English Channel on 19 July and ten days later, while intercepting a raid over Dover, claimed two Ju 87s. On 11 August he claimed 2 Bf 109 'probables' and on the following day destroyed one more. He claimed a Bf 109 down on 13 August, and on the 15th he damaged three Heinkel He 111 bombers. On 18 August O'Meara claimed shared destruction of a Junkers Ju 88 and a Heinkel He 111 destroyed.

O'Meara was shortly afterwards posted to No. 72 Squadron at Biggin Hill. He was promoted flying officer on 3 September 1940, before damaging a Do 17 on 27 September. He was awarded a Distinguished Flying Cross (DFC) on 24 September 1940. His citation in the London Gazette read:

Pilot Officer O'Meara has displayed a very high degree of skill and devotion to duty in all operations against the enemy and has destroyed at least six enemy aircraft. His example and keenness have been outstanding.

He was then transferred for a 'rest period' at No. 421 (Reconnaissance) Flight RAF at Hawkinge, working up new pilots who would eventually form the nucleus of No.91 Squadron RAF.

O'Meara shot down an He 59 of Seenotgruppe 3 on 26 November, a Bf 109 fighter-bomber of LG 2 that was attacking a Royal Navy minesweeper on 5 December, and then damaged another one immediately afterwards. While with No. 91, he was shot down by a Bf 109 and crash-landed near Folkestone on 17 February 1941. He was awarded a Bar to the DFC on 18 March 1941. The citation published in the London Gazette reported that:

This officer has performed excellent work as a fighter pilot in the many and varied missions which have been allotted to him. On a recent occasion he led an offensive operation which extended as far as Holland, and in which troops and a gun-post were machine-gunned; an armed ship was also attacked. Flying Officer O'Meara has now destroyed at least eleven enemy aircraft. He has set an excellent example.

By late April 1941 he had destroyed another Seenotgruppe 3 He 59. On 3 September he was promoted to flight lieutenant and temporarily returned to No. 64 Squadron RAF as a flight commander, bringing his score to at least 12 confirmed victories. He was rested from operations in October 1941, joining 1491 Target Towing Flight at Tain.

In July 1942, after a brief spell with No. 164 Squadron, he was posted to Nigeria with 1432 Flight until August. After returning to the UK O'Meara was appointed RAF liaison officer to the Army Chief of Staff. In January 1943 O'Meara joined No. 234 Squadron until March. In April 1943 he was given command of No. 131 Squadron at Castletown until May 1944. He flew 170 sorties, and claimed a Focke-Wulf Fw 190 damaged in August 1943.

O'Meara was then posted to No. 10 Group HQ, and in October 1944 was recommended for a second Bar to his DFC. Air Vice Marshal Trafford Leigh-Mallory approved a Distinguished Service Order on 27 October 1944 instead, as O'Meara's length of uninterrupted active service warranting higher recognition. His citation, published in the London Gazette stated that:

Squadron Leader O'Meara has completed a notable tour and throughout has displayed a high degree of skill and gallantry. His genius for leadership has been most evident and has contributed in a large way to the operational efficiency of the squadron he commands. He is a relentless fighter and has destroyed 12 enemy aircraft and damaged many more.

O'Meara's wartime score totalled 11 and 2 shared destroyed, 1 unconfirmed destroyed, 4 probables, 11 and 1 shared damaged.

After several civilian jobs he re-joined the RAF as a flight lieutenant on 3 January 1950. He was granted a permanent commission as squadron leader on 1 October 1953, where he remained until retirement on 31 July 1959 with the rank of squadron leader.

== Post-war years ==
After his retirement from the RAF, O'Meara worked as an architect for Wimpey Homes before running several business enterprises. His daughter was hit and killed by a car in 1969 and his relationship with his wife deteriorated and they divorced. He then ran a restaurant before buying a hotel in Port Gaverne, Cornwall.

O'Meara died in 1974 in the Barnstaple Hospital in North Devon after suffering for several years with a liver infection picked up from a parasite while stationed in India. He is buried in Old Town Cemetery, Bideford.

== Bibliography ==
- Pilot's flying log book (Form 414) J.J. O'Meara.
- Aces High by C. Shores & C. Williams (1994), p. 470
- Price, Dr Alfred. Mark I/II Spitfire Aces 1939–1941. Osprey Publishing, London: 1996; ISBN 978-1-85532-627-9
