= No. 531 Squadron RAF =

- Active: 8 Sep 1942 – 25 Jan 1943
- Country: United Kingdom
- Branch: Royal Air Force
- Role: Turbinlite nightfighter squadron
- Part of: No. 11 Group RAF, Fighter Command

No. 531 Squadron RAF was one of the ten Turbinlite nightfighter squadrons of the Royal Air Force during the Second World War.

== History ==
No. 531 Squadron was formed at RAF West Malling, Kent on 8 September 1942, from No. 1452 (Turbinlite) Flight, as part of No. 11 Group RAF in Fighter Command. Instead of operating only Turbinlite and -rudimentary- Airborne Intercept (AI) radar equipped aircraft (Havocs and Bostons) and working together with a normal nightfighter unit, such as in their case with the Boulton Paul Defiants of No. 264 Squadron RAF or later the Hawker Hurricanes of No. 32 Squadron RAF in the Flight, the unit now also flew with their own Hawker Hurricanes. The squadron moved to RAF Debden, Essex on 2 October 1942, but returned to West Malling a week later. It was disbanded at West Malling on 25 January 1943, when Turbinlite squadrons were, due to lack of success on their part and the rapid development of AI radar, thought to be superfluous.

== Aircraft operated ==
Aircraft operated by No. 531 Squadron RAF, data from
| From | To | Aircraft | Version |
|---|---|---|---|
| 8 September 1942 | 25 January 1943 | Douglas Havoc | Mk.I (Turbinlite) |
| 8 September 1942 | 25 January 1943 | Douglas Havoc | Mk.I (Nightfighter) |
| 8 September 1942 | 25 January 1943 | Douglas Boston | Mk.III |
| 8 September 1942 | 25 January 1943 | Hawker Hurricane | Mk.IIc |

== Squadron bases ==
Bases and airfields used by No. 531 Squadron RAF, data from
| From | To | Base |
|---|---|---|
| 8 September 1943 | 2 October 1942 | RAF West Malling, Kent |
| 2 October 1942 | 9 October 1942 | RAF Debden, Essex |
| 9 October 1942 | 25 January 1943 | RAF West Malling, Kent |

== Commanding officers ==
Officers commanding No. 531 Squadron RAF, data from
| From | To | Name |
|---|---|---|
| September 1942 | October 1942 | S/Ldr. G.R. Turner |
| October 1942 | January 1943 | S/Ldr. N.M. Browning |
