= Holque =

Holque Holke
- Commune
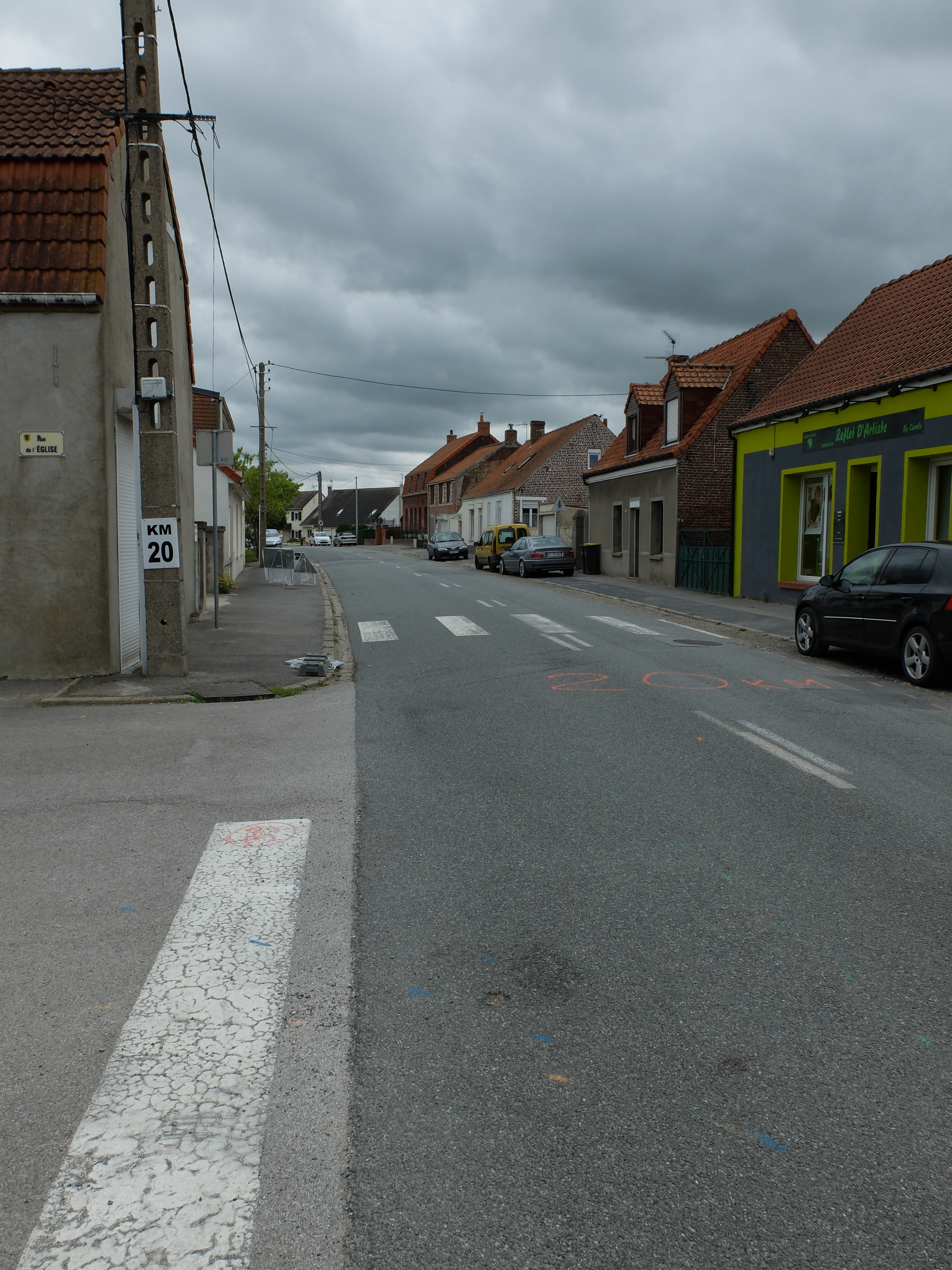
- Route de Bourbourg in Holque

- Coat of arms
- Location of Holque
- Location within France Location within Hauts-de-France
- Coordinates: 50°51′18″N 2°12′15″E
- Country: France
- Region: Hauts-de-France
- Department: Nord
- Arrondissement: Dunkerque
- Canton: Wormhout
- Intercommunality: Hauts de Flandre

Government
  - Mayor (2020–2026): Fabrice Lamiaux
- Area^{1}: 3.81 km^{2} (1.47 sq mi)
- Elevation: 11 m (36 ft)
- Highest elevation: 5 m (16 ft)
- Lowest elevation: 1 m (3.3 ft)
- Population (2023): 837
  - Density: 220/km^{2} (569/sq mi)
- Demonym: Holquois
- Time zone: UTC+01:00 (CET)
  - Summer (DST): UTC+02:00 (CEST)
- INSEE/Postal code: 59307 /59143
- ^{1} French Land Register data, which excludes lakes, ponds, glaciers > 1 km^{2} (0.386 sq mi or 247 acres) and river estuaries.

Holque (French pronunciation: [ɔlk]; from Flemish; Holke in modern Dutch spelling) is a commune in the Nord department in northern France.

== Heraldry ==
Arms of Holque	The arms of Holque are blazoned : Azure, a madonna proper vested and haloed argent and Or, sitting on an antique throne Or, holding in her right hand a sceptre and in her left the baby Jesus, haloed Or and vested argent.

== See also ==
- Communes of the Nord department
