= No. 64 Squadron RAF =

Defunct flying squadron of the Royal Air Force

No. 64 Squadron
- No. 64 Squadron badge
- Active: 1 August 1916 – 31 Dec 1919; 1 March 1936 – 16 June 1967; 16 May 1968 – 31 January 1991
- Country: United Kingdom
- Branch: Royal Air Force
- Mottos: Latin: Tenax propositi ("Firm of purpose")
- Battle honours: Western Front, 1917–1918; Cambrai, 1918; Amiens, Hindenburg Line, Somme, 1918; Lys, Channel & North Sea, 1940; Dunkirk, Battle of Britain, Home Defence, 1940; Fortress Europe, 1941–1944; Normandy, 1944; Arnhem, Walcheren, France & Germany, 1944–1945

Insignia
- Badge: A scarab
- Squadron codes: XQ (February to Sept 1939); SH (September 1939 to April 1951)
- Squadron roundel

No. 64 Squadron was a squadron of the Royal Air Force, first formed on 1 August 1916 in Norfolk as a squadron of the Royal Flying Corps, and serving in France during World War I. It was re-formed in 1936, going on to fly Spitfires in the Battle of Britain, and for much of World War II. Post-war it remained as a fighter squadron, converting to Gloster Meteor jet aircraft in 1951, and then Gloster Javelins until 1967. It then became the shadow unit for No. 228 OCU, flying the F-4 Phantom until both 228 OCU and 64 Squadron were disbanded on 31 January 1991 at RAF Leuchars.

== History ==
=== 1916 to 1919 ===
No. 64 Squadron Royal Flying Corps was formed at Sedgeford in Norfolk on 1 August 1916. Initially, it was equipped with a variety of types for training purposes, including Farman HF.20s, Royal Aircraft Factory F.E.2bs, Avro 504s and Sopwith Pups. In June 1917, the squadron re-equipped with its intended operational equipment, the Airco DH.5 fighter, and began to work up ready for operations. The DH.5 had poor altitude performance, and so the squadron extensively practiced low-level flying both prior to and following its move to France on 14 October 1917. On 20 November, the British launched the Battle of Cambrai, an offensive supported by the use of large number of tanks and No. 64 Squadron supported the British troops, flying many low-level ground attack missions, both during the British attack, and during the German counterattack that followed.

The squadron received SE.5As fighters from January 1918, with its DH.5s being retired in March that year. The squadron supported the British Third Army during the German offensive in March 1918. It continued to fly both fighter and ground-attack operations for the remainder of the First World War. It returned to Narborough in February 1919, where it was disbanded on 31 December 1919. During the World War I era, the squadron claimed in excess of 130 victories, and produced eleven aces, among whom were: James Anderson Slater, Edmund Tempest, Philip Scott Burge, Thomas Rose, Charles Cudemore, William H. Farrow, Dudley Lloyd-Evans, Edward Dawson Atkinson, and Ronald McClintock.

=== 1936 to 1939 ===
On 1 March 1936, 64 Squadron reformed at Heliopolis, Egypt, from two flights detached from 6 and 208 Squadrons, both equipped with the Hawker Demon two-seat biplane fighters although it was officially announced that it was based at Henlow, Bedfordshire in order to not give the impression that British air strength in Egypt was being built up. Italy had invaded Ethiopia in October 1935, and Britain feared that the war could escalate into a conflict between Britain and Italy. As a result, the squadron moved to Ismailia in North-East Egypt on 9 April 1936. If hostilities broke out, its orders were to move west to Mersa Matruh, with duties of attacking Italian airfields and providing fighter cover to refuelling bombers at advance airfields. By the beginning of June 1936, Italy had conquered Ethiopia, ending the risk of war between Britain and Italy. The squadron left Egypt for the United Kingdom in August 1936 to become part of the UK air defences.

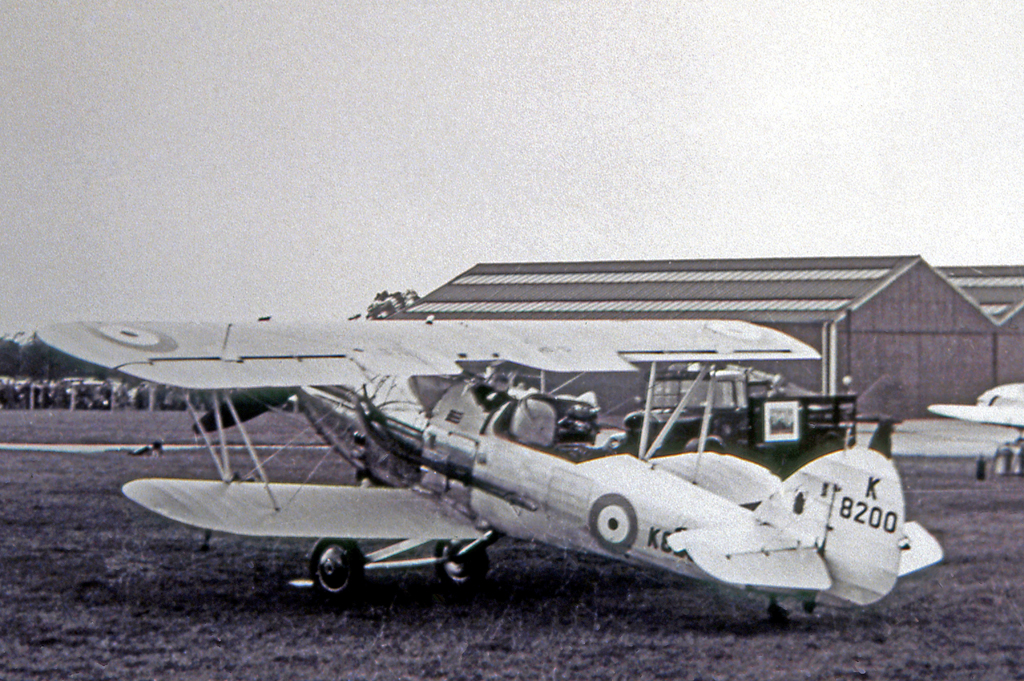
64 Squadron Demon I in June 1938

On return to Britain, the squadron was based at RAF Martlesham Heath, Suffolk, initially as part of 11 Group and transferring to 12 Group in October 1937. In March 1938, the squadron received Turret Demons, with a hydraulically operated shield to protect the gunner from the airstream and allow him to effectively use his gun at high speeds. In May 1938 the squadron moved to RAF Church Fenton in North Yorkshire, and in September 1938, the Munich Crisis caused the squadron's Demons to be camouflaged. By the time of Munich, the Demon biplane was outdated, and the unit was reequipped with twin-engined monoplane Bristol Blenheim Mk I(F) fighters in December 1938, with the squadron training for night fighter operations. After the outbreak of the Second World War, the squadron was engaged in patrols off the British East Coast and in December 1939 provided fighter defence for the Home Fleet at Scapa Flow from Evanton, Scotland, for a month.

=== 1940 to 1967 ===
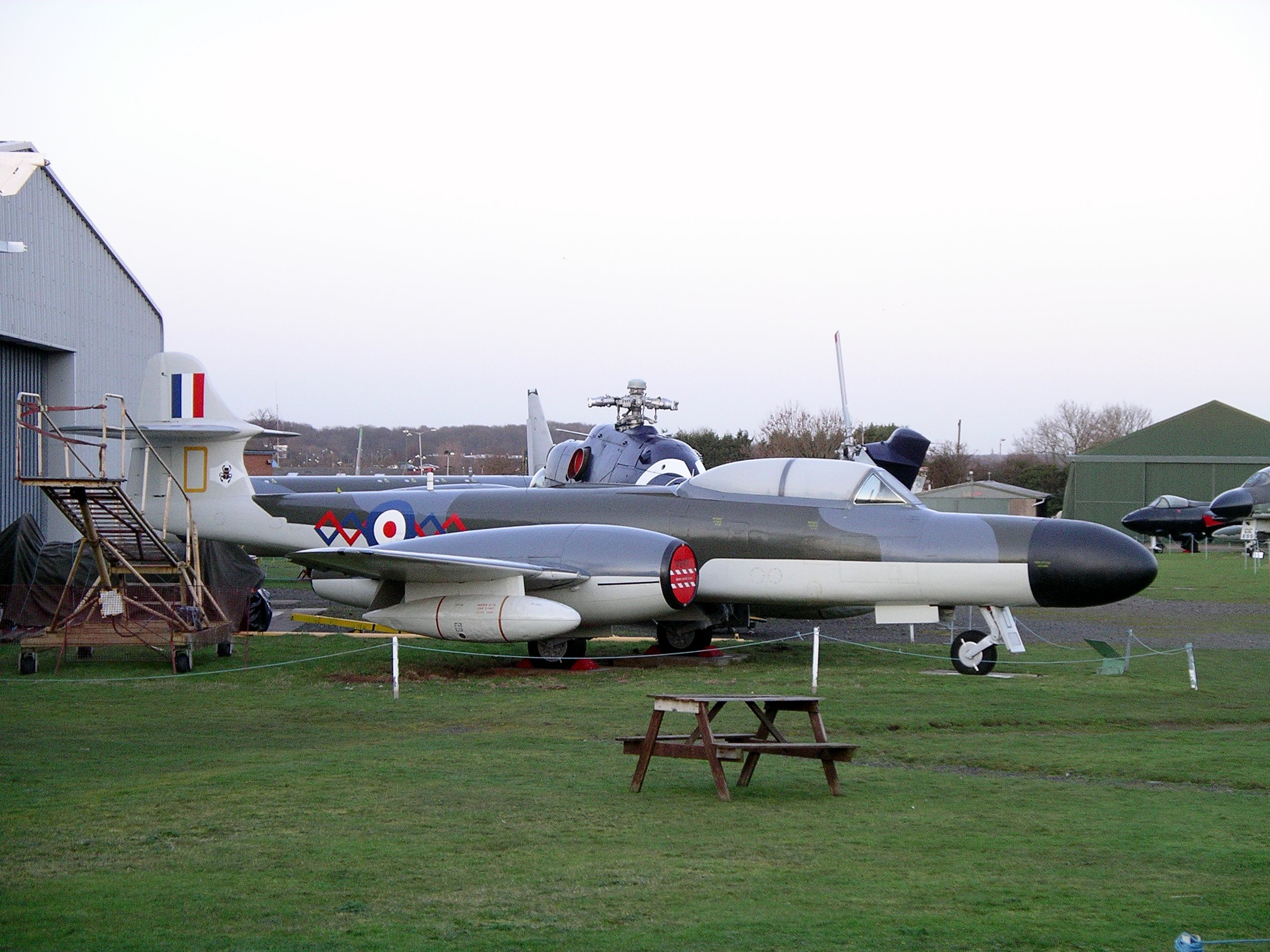
A Meteor NF.14 from 64 Sqn. at the Midland Air Museum.

In April 1940 the squadron converted to the Supermarine Spitfire Mk I. It was immediately engaged in the covering of the Dunkirk evacuation and later took part in the Battle of Britain. In short order 64 squadron operated from Kenley starting 16 May 1940, from Leconfield starting 19 August, from Biggin Hill starting 13 October, from Coltishall starting 15 October, and from Boscombe Down starting 1 September 1940.

In May 1941, No. 64 Squadron moved up to Scotland for air defence duties but moved back south in November to take part in sweeps over northern France, until March 1943 when it moved back up to Scotland again. Then in August 1943 it moved back south again to resume offensive operations and in June 1944, moved to Cornwall for 2 months before beginning long-range escort missions from East Anglia. During that time the squadron was equipped with various marks of the Spitfire: Mk IIA January to November 1941, Mk VB November 1941 to July 1942, and March to September 1943, Mk VC September 1943 to July 1944, and finally Mk IX June 1942 to March 1943, and June to November 1944. In 1944 64 Squadron took part in the operations of the Normandy Landings, Operation Market Garden, and the Battle of the Scheldt.

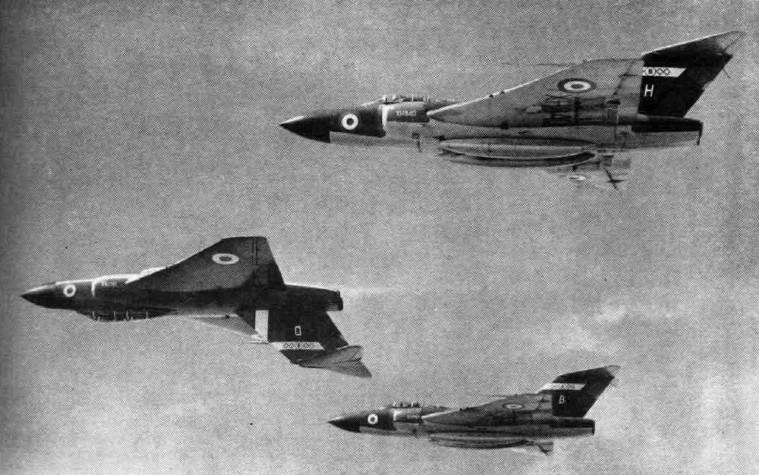
Three 64 Sqn Javelins, putting on a show, 1959

In November 1944 the squadron received the North American Mustang III and flew these for the rest of the war covering daylight raids of the RAF Bomber Command on Germany. After the end of hostilities the squadron moved to RAF Horsham St Faith and received the Mustang IV in August 1945.

In March 1946 No. 64 Squadron received De Havilland Hornet F.1 twin-engined fighters and moved to RAF Linton-on-Ouse in August of the same year. The F.1 was replaced by the Hornet F.3 in April 1948. In March 1951 the squadron converted to the Gloster Meteor F.4/F.8 jet fighter. The squadron was also relocated to RAF Duxford. In September 1956 the F.8s were replaced by the radar-equipped, two seat Meteor NF.12/NF.14.

In September 1958 64 squadron then converted to the Gloster Javelin FAW.7/FAW.9. In 1964 the squadron moved to RAF Tengah, partnering No. 60 Squadron RAF. The squadron was disbanded on 16 June 1967.

=== 1968 to 1991 ===
Since then the squadron had been the 'Shadow'/Reserve identity of No. 228 OCU, flying the McDonnell Douglas Phantom FG.1/FGR.2, first from RAF Coningsby since 16 May 1968 and then from RAF Leuchars, to where the OCU moved on 22 April 1987. When No. 228 OCU was disbanded on 31 January 1991, so was No. 64 Squadron.

== Notable members ==
- Art Donahue
- Squadron Leader/Wing Commander Michel Donnet
- Flying Officer Raymond Sanders Draper
- Adrian Francis Laws
- Wing Commander Dudley Lloyd-Evans
- Donald MacDonell
- John Noble MacKenzie
- Jackie Mann
- James O'Meara

== No. 64 Squadron in fiction ==
At the start of episode 2 of the miniseries Piece of Cake the Adjutant, Flight Lieutenant 'Uncle' Kellaway reveals, during his recap of the events of episode 1, that it was one of the Bristol Blenheims of No 64 Squadron that was accidentally shot down by Hornet Squadron.
