= Donald MacDonell (RAF officer) =

British flying ace of WWII

- Born: 15 November 1913; Baku, Russia (now Azerbaijan)
- Died: 7 June 1999 (aged 85)
- Military career
- Allegiance: United Kingdom
- Branch: Royal Air Force
- Service years: 1932–1964
- Rank: Air Commodore
- Commands: No. 64 Squadron
- Conflicts: Second World War: Battle of Britain; Circus offensive; Cold War
- Awards: Companion of the Order of the Bath; Distinguished Flying Cross; Mention in Despatches
- Other work: Construction executive 22nd Chief of Glengarry

Donald MacDonell, CB, DFC (15 November 1913 – 7 June 1999) was a British flying ace of the Royal Air Force (RAF) during the Second World War. He is credited with the destruction of at least ten aircraft.

The son of the 21st Chief of Glengarry, MacDonell was born in Baku in what is now Azerbaijan. Educated in England, he entered the service of the RAF as a pilot officer in 1934 when he graduated from the RAF College at Cranwell. After serving with No. 54 Squadron for a time, he was seconded to the Fleet Air Arm and flew with its squadrons before resuming service with the RAF as an instructor. At the time of the outbreak of the Second World War, he was assigned to the Air Ministry in a training role. He was posted to No. 64 Squadron in July, taking up command of the unit several days after his arrival and claiming several aerial victories during the Battle of Britain. He was shot down in March 1941 during the RAF's Circus offensive and spent the remainder of the war in captivity.

Remaining in the RAF in the postwar period, MacDonell, who had succeeded his father as the Chief of Glengarry while a prisoner of war, served in a series of instructing and teaching posts. From 1956 to 1958 he was the air attaché at the British Embassy in Moscow and he finished his military career as an air commodore holding a director's role at the Ministry of Defence. Returning to civilian life in 1964, he worked in the construction industry for several years. He retired in 1981 and settled in Fortrose in Scotland. As well as being involved in Scottish organisations, he was active in Veterans' affairs. He died on 7 June 1999, aged 86.

== Early life ==
Aenas Ranald Donald MacDonell, known as Donald, was born on 15 November 1913 in Baku in what was then Russia (now Azerbaijan). He was of Scottish descent, and his father, Ranald MacDonell was the 21st Chief of Glengarry and the British Counsel at Baku at the time of his birth. MacDonell was educated in England, at Hurstpierpoint School and then, in September 1932, commenced studying at the Royal Air Force College at Cranwell as a flight cadet. He graduated as a pilot officer on 28 July 1934.

MacDonell was posted to No. 54 Squadron at Hornchurch. The unit was equipped with the Bristol Bulldog biplane fighter. Being peacetime, it was engaged in training but was also involved in the annual Empire Air Day at Hendon Aerodrome. In November 1935, having undergone a conversion course at Leuchars during the previous few months, he was seconded to the Fleet Air Arm. Sent to Egypt, he was duly assigned to 800 Naval Air Squadron, on HMS Courageous, and then 802 Naval Air Squadron, on HMS Glorious. During this period he was promoted to flying officer. In January 1938, MacDonell was promoted to flight lieutenant. At this time, he returned to the United Kingdom to serve as an instructor at Gosport.

In January 1939, MacDonell commenced a two month course at the Central Flying School at Upavon and then proceeded to No. 13 Flying Training School at Drem. In August he was promoted to squadron leader and posted to the Air Ministry to serve in the Directorate of Training.

== Second World War ==
MacDonell remained at the Air Ministry for the first several months of the Second World War but in June 1940 went to No. 5 Operational Training Unit for familiarisation on the Supermarine Spitfire fighter. The following month he was posted to No. 64 Squadron as a supernumerary pilot.

=== Battle of Britain ===
No. 64 Squadron operated Spitfires from Kenley and was engaged in the aerial fighting over the English Channel as the Luftwaffe increased its operations against the United Kingdom. On 25 July, MacDonell shot down a Junkers Ju 87 dive bomber 12 miles (19 km) off Dover. His Spitfire was damaged during the engagement and he had to make a forced landing back at the squadron's airfield with an overheated engine. He was briefly trapped in the cockpit as his canopy was jammed and had to be rescued by ground crew. The next day he assumed command of the squadron.

In the morning of 29 July, there was a major bombing attack on a convoy off Dover and No. 64 Squadron was one of those scrambled to engage it. MacDonell destroyed one Ju 87, as well as shooting down a Messerschmitt Bf 109 fighter and damaging a second. On 5 August MacDonell led his squadron across the English Channel where they attacked patrolling Bf 109s. He shot down one Bf 109 north of Cap Gris-Nez with a second claimed as destroyed although this was unable to be confirmed. Another two Bf 109s that MacDonnel claimed to have destroyed to the north of Dover on 8 August also could not be confirmed.

On 11 August MacDonell shot down a Bf 109 over Dover, and damaged a second to the north of the town. Four days later, over 10 miles (16 km) to the south of Dover he destroyed one Bf 109 and damaged another. On 16 August, he shot down another Bf 109, damaged a second, and was credited with a third as probably destroyed, all in the vicinity of Dover. Later, he shared in the destruction of a Heinkel He 111 medium bomber and damaged a second near Tonbridge. On his last sortie of the day, he was shot down during an engagement with Bf 109s but was able to bale out safely. On 18 August, now known as The Hardest Day, the Kenley airfield was attacked by the Luftwaffe while No. 64 Squadron was in the air and it was called upon to intercept. MacDonell destroyed a Messerschmitt Bf 110 heavy fighter over the airfield, and also damaged a Junkers Ju 88 medium bomber.

The squadron moved north to Leconfield for a rest the next day to refit after its losses over the preceding weeks. MacDonell's successes and leadership of the squadron during the Battle of Britain were recognised in September with an award of the Distinguished Flying Cross. The citation, published in The London Gazette, read:

This officer has shot down nine enemy aircraft and damaged four others. He has been particularly successful as a leader and has displayed the highest courage, setting a splendid example to his squadron.

— London Gazette, No. 34940, 6 September 1940.

=== Circus offensive ===
In October No. 64 Squadron moved south and after a few weeks became part of the fighter wing based at Hornchurch. From early 1941 it was engaged in the RAF's Circus offensive against German-occupied Europe. On 13 March, the Hornchurch fighter wing was part of Circus No. 8, which was a bombing raid against the Luftwaffe airfield at Calais. The wing flew over the bombed area after the raid to draw out German fighters and No. 64 Squadron sighted several Bf 109s above them. In the resulting engagement, MacDonell was shot down by the German flying ace Werner Mölders and baled out off the French coast. He was picked up by a German E-boat and made a prisoner of war (POW) for the remainder of the war in Europe. Part of his captivity was spent in the Stalag Luft III POW camp where he was one of the senior prisoners. He assisted in several escape attempts, including that of the 'Wooden Horse', which was made into a film.

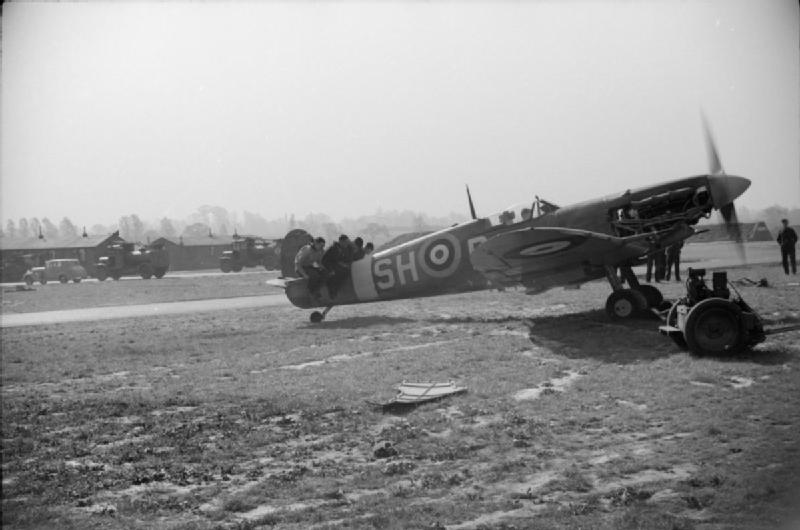
A Supermarine Spitfire fighter of No. 64 Squadron at Hornchurch

MacDonell was freed in April 1945 and repatriated to the United Kingdom. By this time he was the 22nd Chief of Glengarry, having inherited the title upon the death of his father in May 1941. In recognition of his services while a prisoner of war, he was mentioned in despatches. He was also promoted to acting wing commander.

== Postwar career ==
Returning to active service, MacDonell was posted to the War Cabinet Office as Director of Plans. In April 1946, he went to RAF Staff College after which he was assigned to the headquarters of Flying Training Command. In October, his wing commander rank was made substantive. In July 1949, he became the chief flying instructor at Cranwell. The following year he commenced 18 months of learning the Russian language and after this was completed, he was appointed Director of Studies at the Joint Services Staff College. In October 1952 he was posted to the Ministry of Defence (MoD) to serve on the Joint Planning Staff.

In April 1954, MacDonell returned to the JSSC and was promoted to group captain two months later. He served as the air attaché in the British embassy in Moscow from April 1956 to July 1958, after which he was appointed commandant of No. 1 Initial Training School at South Cerney. In February 1960 he returned to the MoD to hold a director's role there. In the 1964 New Year Honours, MacDonell was appointed a Companion of the Order of the Bath. He retired from military service later in the year, on 15 November, holding the rank of air commodore.

== Later life ==
In civilian life, MacDonnel worked in construction, holding a series of management roles before becoming a partner in a recruitment agency in 1976. His wife Diana died in 1980, and the following year MacDonell retired to Fortrose. He remarried two years later, to Lois. He was prominent in Scottish organisations, including the Standing Council of Scottish Chiefs and the Clan Donald Lands Trust, and involved in veteran's affairs, including as the Honorary President of the Ross and Cromarty branch of the Soldiers', Sailors', and Airmen's Family Association and Chairman Emeritus of the Battle of Britain Fighter Association. He died on 7 June 1999 and was survived by his second wife, and five children.

MacDonell is credited with having destroyed at least ten aircraft, one of which shared with another pilot, and damaged seven others. Three further aerial victories were unconfirmed. He is also credited with probably destroying one aircraft.
