= No. 421 (Reconnaissance) Flight RAF =

Royal Air Force unit during WW2

- Active: 1 October 1940 – 11 January 1941
- Role: Early warning reconnaissance
- Garrison/HQ: RAF Hawkinge
- Equipment: Supermarine Spitfire IIa
- Battle honours: Battle of Britain

No. 421 (Reconnaissance) Flight was a specialist RAF fighter flight created on 21 September 1940 to patrol the Channel and provide early warning of the types of incoming Luftwaffe raids from occupied France. It was later expanded to full squadron strength and renumbered as No. 91 Squadron on 11 January 1941. Its role led to its pilots being nicknamed "Jim Crows".

== Background ==
In late September 1940, Air Chief Marshal Hugh Dowding was faced with two problems. The first was a change in Luftwaffe tactics. Until then the main daylight striking force had been the German bombers, heavily escorted by fighters. With the shift in phases in the Battle of Britain, the bombers had concentrated first on Channel convoys, then the 11 Group airfields, and finally London. Göring's aim had been to wear down the RAF fighters, but instead he saw an unacceptable level of his bombers lost. Whilst fighter-bombers, known to the Luftwaffe as Jabos, had been tried by Luftwaffe units such as Erprobungsgruppe 210 during the Battle, these had mainly been small and low-altitude efforts. Now the bombers switched mainly to night attacks, and the day operations more often consisted of high-flying Bf 109 sweeps and large numbers of Bf 109 Jabos with escorts. This was intended both to force the RAF fighters to engage the Luftwaffe fighters and also keep the pressure on the RAF. The Jabos could always jettison their bombs and revert to being fighters if intercepted. The Jabos were not much of a tactical threat in that - apart from specialists like Erpro. 210 - they were highly inaccurate when dropping their bombs, but against area targets such as London they could still cause significant damage and civilian deaths. It was impossible for the Fighter Command Controllers to identify which incoming raids were fighter sweeps (which posed no threat to Britain and were to be avoided), which were the escorted Jabo raids, and which were escorted bombers, the last two requiring different tactics to minimise RAF losses and maximise those of the Luftwaffe.

Dowding's second problem was how to hide the information the RAF was gleaning from Ultra, the information from interception of German transmissions encoded with the Enigma machine. Ultra had given the RAF advance warning of some major Luftwaffe raids, and the general radio interceptions from the Y-stations had also provided clues. It was also providing information on German shipping in the Channel. Dowding did not want the Germans becoming suspicious of how well prepared the British were getting.

Dowding's solution was to create a special unit of experienced pilots to patrol the Channel during daylight hours, alone or in pairs, identifying which incoming raids were Jabos and which were fighter sweeps, and also provide information on German naval activity. The activities of this unit would also provide for the Germans a believable source for the RAF's preparedness, protecting Ultra. This unit was called No. 421 Flight.

== Formation ==
One of the first pilots assigned to 421 Flight was Pilot Officer James O'Meara. P/O O'Meara had just received the DFC for his service with No. 72 Squadron and was posted to Hawkinge on 28 September 1940 to start training and organising the pilots being sent to form 421 Flight. On 1 October 1940 the Flight was officially raised with six Spitfire IIa's from No. 66 Squadron. F/Lt Charles "Paddy" Green was posted as the commanding officer.

== Pilots ==
The following pilots are known to have served with 421 Flight (ranks as in 1940):

- Flt. Lt. B. Drake, British
- Plt. Off. Elliott, British, possibly Robert Deacon Elliott, ex-72 Squadron
- Flt. Lt. C.P. "Paddy" Green, British
- F/O D.T. Parrott, British
- Plt. Off. H.C. Baker, British
- Plt. Off. K.A. Lawrence, New Zealander
- Plt. Off. P. McD. Hartas, British (killed in action 10 February 1941)
- Plt. Off. J.J. O'Meara, British
- Plt. Off. J.E. "Jas" Storrar, British (only briefly with 421 Flight before going to 73Sq and on to Africa in November 1940)
- Sgt. C.A.H. Ayling, British (killed in action 11 October 1940)
- Sgt. J. Gillies, British, (killed in action 21 April 1944 in Burma)
- Sgt. D.A.S. McKay, British
- Sgt. F.S. Perkin, British
- Sgt. A.W.P. Spears British
- Sgt. D.H. Forrest, British
- Sgt. M. A. W. Lee (killed in action 31 December 1940)
- Sgt. Cox (details unknown)
- F/O George Allan Cashion RCAF KIA 25.July 1944 near Charleval (S/E Rouen), France

Of the pilots listed above, at least eight already were or later became fighter aces, a reflection of the average level of experience and ability and why the Flight (and later No. 91 Squadron) had a reputation as a "crack" unit:

- Billy Drake, 23.5 destroyed (at least three destroyed before he joined the Flight, and later the RAF's top-scoring P-40 ace)
- Jas Storrar, 12.53 (at least 5.5, possibly as many as nine, before he joined the Flight)
- Don McKay, 14 (seven, possibly eight, before he joined the Flight)
- James O'Meara, 11.7 (at least six before he joined the Flight)
- Paddy Green, 11 (at least one before he joined the Flight, and later a Beaufighter ace)
- Henry Baker, 5.83 (two and a shared before he joined the Flight)
- James Gillies, 5.16 (one and a shared before he joined the Flight)
- Keith Lawrence 5 - (three and a shared before he joined the Flight)

== Equipment ==
The Flight was originally formed with six Supermarine Spitfire Mk.IIa's and some Hawker Hurricane Mk. I's. 421 Flight is supposed to have received the first Hurricane IIa's received by a frontline unit on 12 October 1940, though 111Sq had Hurricane IIa's for trials in September 1940 (P/O Macinski of 111Sq was killed on 4 September 1940 at 1340hrs when he baled out of Hurricane IIa Z2309 over the Channel after combat with Bf 109's). On 9 November 1940 nine new Spitfire IIa's were issued to 421 Flight and the Hurricanes went to other squadrons.

== Squadron Codes ==
- L-Z (as LZ was previously used by 66Sq, 421 Flt used L-Z with a small dash, during the end of 1940, e.g., "L-Z-I")
- DL (also used later by 91Sq)

== Bases ==
- Hawkinge 1–7 October 1940
- Gravesend 8–30 October 1940
- West Malling 31 October - 5 November 1940
- Biggin Hill 6–14 November 1940
- Hawkinge 15 November 1940 – 10 January 1941

== Bibliography ==
- Kent Battle of Britain Museum - https://web.archive.org/web/20080325212017/http://www.kbobm.org/index.htm
- Billy Drake, Fighter Leader Billy Drake and Christopher Shores, ISBN 1 902304 97 7
- Canadian Virtual War Memorial - http://www.veterans.gc.ca/eng/remembrance/memorials/canadian-virtual-war-memorial/detail/2320673?George%20Allan%20Cashion
