= No. 91 Squadron RAF =

Defunct flying squadron of the Royal Air Force

No. 91 (Nigeria) Squadron RAF
- Active: 1 Sep 1917 – 3 July 1919; 9 January 1941 – 31 January 1947
- Country: United Kingdom
- Branch: Royal Air Force
- Nickname: Nigeria
- Motto: "We seek alone"

Commanders
- Notable commanders: Group Captain Bobby Oxspring, DFC and Bar

Insignia
- Squadron Badge: In front of a fountain, two triangles interlaced.
- Squadron Codes: HQ (Apr 1939 – Sep 1939); DL (Jan 1941 – Jan 1947)

No 91 (Nigeria) Squadron was a squadron of the Royal Air Force but is no longer operational. The name acknowledges the contribution made by Nigeria to the cost of the squadron's aeroplanes.

== World War I ==
A 91 squadron was initially formed in September 1917 at RAF Spitalgate but had moved to Chattis Hill within the month to undertake wireless telegraphy training. The squadron number was then reallocated in July 1918 to a fighter squadron being formed at RAF Kenley. The new squadron was intended to be equipped with Sopwith Dolphins but never became operational in time and was moved to Lopcombe Corner near Salisbury, and disbanded in July 1919.

== World War II ==
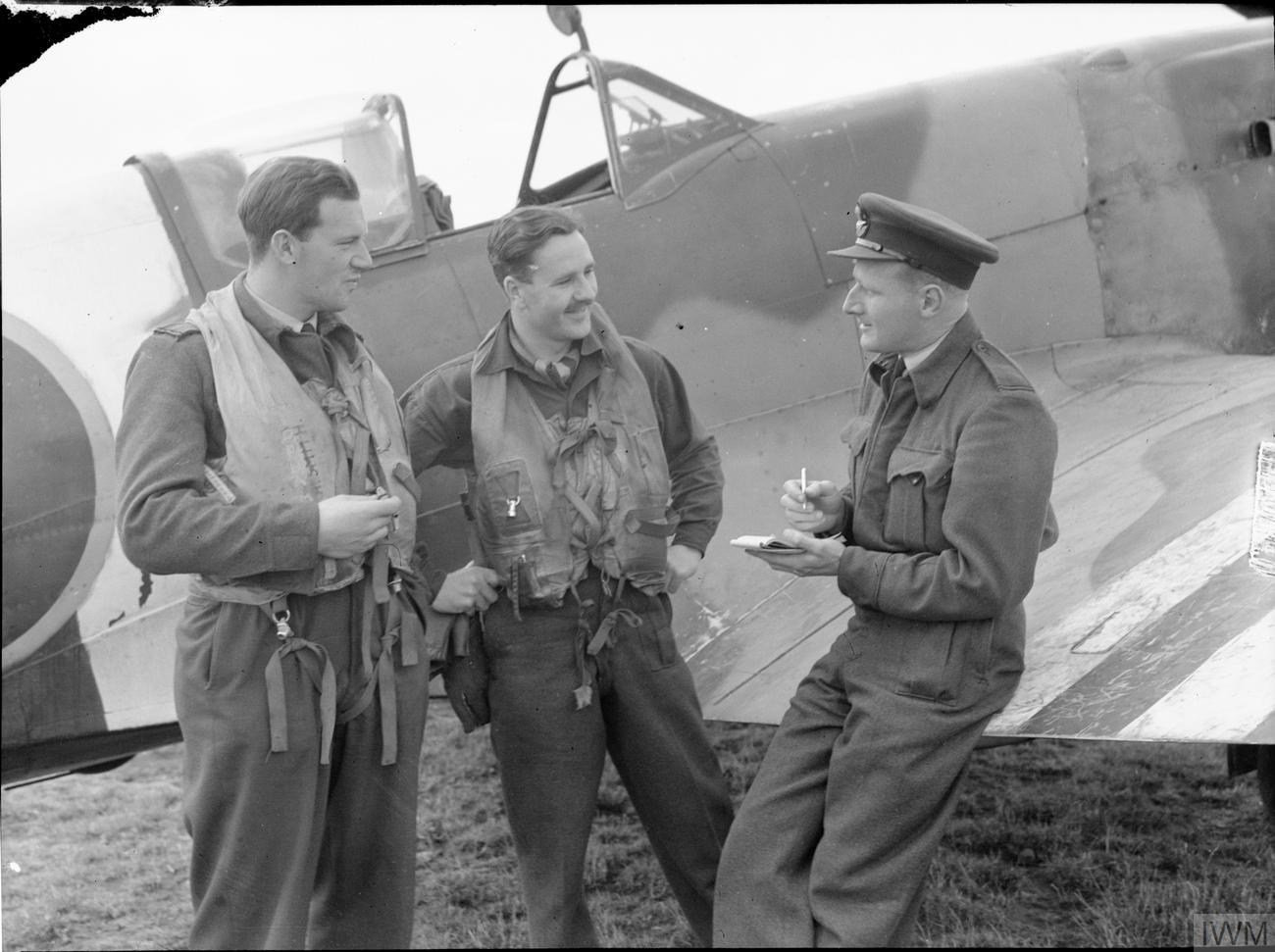
Pilots of No. 91 Squadron are debriefed following a patrol to intercept V-1 flying bombs in the weeks after D-Day

In January 1941 the squadron was reformed from No. 421 (Reconnaissance) Flight and based at RAF Hawkinge, Kent equipped with Spitfires, carrying out weather reconnaissance and Air Sea Rescue operations. In April 1943 the Squadron moved to RAF Kings Cliffe where they converted on to the Spitfire XII, the first Griffon engined Spitfires, before returning south. The new, more powerful, Spitfire proved very successful in intercepting the low-flying Focke-Wulf 190s. They also flew reconnaissance missions over northern France and later concentrated on bomber escort duties. In March 1944 the squadron was assigned to the Second Tactical Air Force and flew tactical sweeps over the Normandy landing zones. Later in the year, now based at RAF West Malling, Kent and equipped with the faster Spitfire XIVs they were deployed to combat the V-1 flying-bomb attacks (Capitaine Jean Maridor was blown up in mid-air when he got in too close to shoot a V-1 down).From January 1945 the Squadron began to replace its Spitfire LF Mk.IX aircraft with the more modern Griffon powered Mk.XXI, being the first of two squadrons (The other being No.1 Squadron RAF) to use this variant operationally before the end of the war. In April 1945 the squadron relocated to East Anglia to carry out reconnaissance missions and searches for midget submarines off the coast of the Netherlands and Belgium.

== Post-war ==
After the war the Squadron moved to RAF Duxford and in October 1946 converted to Gloster Meteors. It was renumbered 92 Squadron in January 1947.

== Aircraft Operated ==
The Squadron has operated a wide array of aircraft throughout the years, including:

- Supermarine Spitfire Mk.IIA (October 1940)
- Hawker Hurricane Mk.IIA (October - November 1940)
- Supermarine Spitfire Mk.IIA (November 1940 - May 1941)
- Supermarine Spitfire Mk.VB (May 1941 - May 1943)
- Supermarine Spitfire Spitfire Mk.VI (June 1942 - Unknown)
- Supermarine Spitfire Mk.XII (May 1943 - March 1944)
- Supermarine Spitfire Mk.XIV (March - August 1944)
- Supermarine Spitfire LF Mk.IX (August 1944 - January 1945)
- Supermarine Spitfire Mk.XXI (January 1945 - October 1946)
- Gloster Meteor Mk.3 (October 1946 - January 1947)

== See also ==
- List of RAF squadrons
- No.11 Group RAF
