= RAF Fighter Command order of battle 1940 =

RAF Battle of Britain order of battle

This article lists the RAF Fighter Command order of battle at 15 September 1940, during the Battle of Britain.

== Fighter Command ==
RAF Fighter Command Headquarters was located at RAF Bentley Priory, near Stanmore in North London. The commanding officer was Air Chief Marshal Hugh C.T. Dowding.

== Fighter groups ==
Group	Headquarters	Commanding officer	Area of operations
9 Group	RAF Barton Hall, Preston, Lancashire	Wilfred McClaughry	North West England and Northern Ireland
10 Group	RAF Box, Box, Wiltshire	Quintin Brand	South West England and South Wales
11 Group	RAF Uxbridge, Hillingdon, Middlesex	Keith Park	South East England and London
12 Group	RAF Watnall, Nottinghamshire	Trafford Leigh-Mallory	East Anglia, the Midlands, Mid Wales and North Wales
13 Group	RAF Newcastle, Kenton Bar, Newcastle upon Tyne	Richard Saul	Northern England, Northern Ireland and Scotland
14 Group	Drumossie Hotel, Inverness	Malcolm Henderson	Scotland

== Sector stations and satellite aerodromes ==
Sector stations had sector control rooms as well as the usual features of RAF aerodromes; they were able to control RAF fighter formations during the battle. Sector stations were also able to disperse squadrons to satellite aerodromes, most of which were fully equipped.

Sector	Group	Sector station	Radio call sign	Satellite airfield or airfields
A	11	Tangmere	SHORTJACK	Westhampnett
B	11	Kenley	TOPHAT	Croydon
C	11	Biggin Hill	SAPPER	West Malling, Gravesend
D	11	Hornchurch	LUMBA	Gravesend, Rochford, Manston, Hawkinge
E	11	North Weald	COWSLIP	Stapleford Tawney, Martlesham Heath
F	11	Debden	GARTER	Martlesham Heath
G	12	Duxford		Fowlmere
K	12	Wittering		Coltishall
L	12	Digby		Ternhill
M	12	Kirton-in-Lindsey		
N	12	Church Fenton		Leconfield
O	13	Usworth		Catterick
P	13	Acklington		
Q	13	Turnhouse		Drem, Grangemouth
R	13	Dyce		Grangemouth
S	13	Wick		Grimsetter, Sumburgh
W	10	Filton		Boscombe Down, Colerne, Pembrey
Y	10	Middle Wallop	STARLIGHT	Boscombe Down, Warmwell, Exeter, some control over RNAS Roborough, St. Eval
Z	11	Northolt		Hendon

== Stations and squadrons ==
Table of stations and squadrons
Sector Station	Squadron	Type	Squadron code	R/T call sign	Aerodrome	CO
10 Group						
RAF Middle Wallop	No. 238 Sqn	Hurricane	VK		RAF Middle Wallop	Sqn Ldr Harold Fenton
RAF Middle Wallop	No. 609 Sqn	Spitfire	PR	SORBO	RAF Warmwell	Sqn Ldr Horace Darley
RAF Middle Wallop	No. 604 (Night Fighter) Sqn	Blenheim, Beaufighter	NG		RAF Middle Wallop	Sqn Ldr Michael Anderson
RAF Middle Wallop	No. 23 Sqn (part)	Blenheim	YP		RAF Middle Wallop	Sqn Ldr George Heycock
RAF Middle Wallop	No. 152 Sqn	Spitfire	UM	MAIDA	RAF Warmwell	Sqn Ldr Peter Devitt
RAF Middle Wallop	No. 56 Sqn	Hurricane	US	BAFFIN	RAF Boscombe Down	Sqn Ldr Herbert Pinfold
RAF Filton	No. 79 Sqn	Hurricane	NV	PANSY	RAF Pembrey	Sqn Ldr J. Hervey Heyworth
RAF Filton	No. 87 Sqn	Hurricane	LK	SUNCUP	RAF Exeter, RAF Bibury	Flt Lt R. S. Mills
RAF Filton	No. 601 Sqn	Hurricane	UF	WEAPON	RAF Filton	Flt Lt Sir Archibald Hope (Acting CO)
RAF Filton	No. 234 Sqn	Spitfire	AZ	CRESSY	RAF St Eval	Sqn Ldr Minden Blake
RAF Filton	No. 236 (Coastal Command) Sqn	Blenheim	FA		RAF St Eval	Sqn Ldr G. W. Montagu
RAF Filton	No. 247 Sqn	Gladiator	HP		RNAS Roborough	Flight Lieutenant Hugh Chater
11 Group						
RAF Biggin Hill	No. 72 Sqn	Spitfire	RN	TENNIS	RAF Biggin Hill	Sqn Ldr A. R. Collins
RAF Biggin Hill	No. 92 Sqn	Spitfire	QJ	GANNIC	RAF Biggin Hill	Sqn Ldr P. J. Sanders
RAF Biggin Hill	No. 141 Sqn (half)	Defiant	TW		RAF Biggin Hill	Sqn Ldr W. A. Richardson
RAF Biggin Hill	No. 66 Sqn	Spitfire	LZ	FIBUS	RAF Gravesend	Rupert Leigh
RAF North Weald	No. 249 Sqn	Hurricane	GN	GANER	RAF Middle Wallop	Sqn Ldr John Grandy
RAF North Weald	No. 23 Sqn (part)	Blenheim	YP		RAF North Weald	Sqn Ldr George Heycock
RAF North Weald	No. 46 Sqn	Hurricane	PO	ANGEL	RAF Stapleford	Sqn Ldr J. R. MacLachlan
RAF Kenley	No. 253 Sqn	Hurricane	SW		RAF Kenley	Sqn Ldr E. R. Bitmead
RAF Kenley	No. 501 Sqn	Hurricane	SD	VICEROY	RAF Kenley	Sqn Ldr Harry Hogan
RAF Kenley	No. 605 Sqn	Hurricane	UP	TURKEY	RAF Croydon	Sqn Ldr Walter Churchill
RAF Hornchurch	No. 603 Sqn	Spitfire	XT	VIKEN	RAF Hornchurch	Sqn Ldr George Denholm
RAF Hornchurch	No. 600 (Night Fighter) Sqn	Blenheim, Beaufighter	BQ		RAF Hornchurch	Sqn Ldr H. L. Maxwell
RAF Hornchurch	No. 41 Sqn	Spitfire	EB	MITOR	RAF Hornchurch	Sqn Ldr Don Finlay
RAF Hornchurch	No. 222 Sqn	Spitfire	ZD	KOTEL	RAF Hornchurch	Sqn Ldr John Hill
RAF Tangmere	No. 213 Sqn	Hurricane	AK	BEARSKIN	RAF Tangmere	Flt Lt D. S. Wilson-Macdonald
RAF Tangmere	No. 607 Sqn	Hurricane	AF		RAF Tangmere	Sqn Ldr James Vick
RAF Tangmere	No. 602 Sqn	Spitfire	LO	VILLA	RAF Westhampnett	Sqn Ldr A. V. R. "Sandy" Johnstone DFC
RAF Tangmere	No. 23 Sqn (part)	Blenheim, Beaufighter	YP		RAF Ford	Sqn Ldr George Heycock
RAF Debden	No. 17 Sqn	Hurricane	YB	EDEY	RAF Debden	Sqn Ldr A. G. Miller
RAF Debden	No. 73 Sqn	Hurricane	TP		RAF Debden	Sqn Ldr Mike Beytagh
RAF Debden	No. 257 Sqn	Hurricane	DT	ALERT	RAF Martlesham Heath	Sqn Ldr Robert Stanford Tuck
RAF Debden	No. 25 Sqn (part)	Blenheim	ZK		RAF Martlesham Heath	Sqn Ldr Wilfred Loxton
RAF Northolt	No. 1 Sqn RCAF	Hurricane	YO	CARIBOU	RAF Northolt	Sqn Ldr Ernest McNab
RAF Northolt	No. 229 Sqn	Hurricane	RE	KETA	RAF Northolt	Sqn Ldr Harry Maguire
RAF Northolt	No. 303 (Polish) Sqn	Hurricane	RF	APANY	RAF Northolt	Sqn Ldr Ronald Kellet
RAF Northolt	No. 264 Sqn (part)	Defiant	PS		RAF Northolt	Sqn Ldr George Garvin
RAF Northolt	No. 504 Sqn	Hurricane	TM		RAF Hendon	Sqn Ldr John Sample
12 Group						
RAF Duxford	No. 242 Sqn	Hurricane	LE	LORAG	RAF Duxford	Sqn Ldr Douglas Bader
RAF Duxford	No. 302 (Polish) Sqn	Hurricane	WX	CALEB	RAF Duxford	Sqn Ldr W. A. Jack Satchell / Sqn Ldr M. V. M. Mumler
RAF Duxford	No. 310 (Czech) Sqn	Hurricane	NN	CALLA	RAF Duxford	Flt Lt Douglas Blackwood / Sqn Ldr A. Sasha Hess
RAF Duxford	No. 19 Sqn	Spitfire	QV	LUTON	RAF Fowlmere	Sqn Ldr Brian Lane
RAF Coltishall	No. 74 Sqn	Spitfire	ZP	DYSOE	RAF Wittering	Sqn Ldr Adolph Malan
RAF Kirton-in-Lindsey	No. 616 Sqn	Spitfire	QJ	RADPOE	RAF Kirton-in-Lindsey	Flt Lt H. F. "Billy" Burton
RAF Kirton-in-Lindsey	No. 264 Sqn (part)	Defiant	PS		RAF Kirton-in-Lindsey	Sqn Ldr George Garvin
RAF Digby	No. 151 Sqn	Hurricane	DZ		RAF Digby	
RAF Digby	No. 611 Sqn	Spitfire	FY	CHARLIE	RAF Digby	Sqn Ldr Jim McComb
RAF Digby	No. 29 (Night Fighter) Sqn	Blenheim, Beaufighter	RO		RAF Digby	Sqn Ldr Stan Widdows
RAF Wittering	No. 1 Sqn	Hurricane	JX		RAF Wittering	Sqn Ldr David Pemberton DFC
RAF Wittering	No. 266 Sqn	Spitfire	UO		RAF Wittering	Flt Lt Patrick Jameson
RAF Church Fenton	No. 85 Sqn	Hurricane	VY	HYDRO	RAF Church Fenton	Sqn Ldr Peter Townsend
RAF Church Fenton	No. 306 (Polish) Sqn (part)	Hurricane	UZ		RAF Church Fenton	Sqn Ldr D. R. Scott
RAF Church Fenton	No. 64 Sqn	Spitfire	SH	FREEMA	RAF Leconfield / RAF Ringway	Sqn Ldr Don MacDonell
13 Group						
RAF Usworth	No. 54 Sqn	Spitfire	KL	RABBIT	RAF Catterick	Flt Lt F. P. R. Dunworth
RAF Usworth	No. 219 (Night Fighter) Sqn (part)	Blenheim, Beaufighter	FK		RAF Catterick	Sqn Ldr J. H. Little
RAF Usworth	No. 43 Sqn	Hurricane	FT		RAF Usworth	Sqn Ldr Thomas Dalton-Morgan
RAF Acklington	No. 32 Sqn	Hurricane	GZ	JACKO	RAF Acklington	Flt Lt Mike Crossley
RAF Acklington	No. 219 (Night Fighter) Sqn (part)	Blenheim	FK		RAF Acklington	Sqn Ldr J. H. Little
RAF Turnhouse	No. 3 Sqn	Hurricane	QO		RAF Turnhouse	Sqn Ldr S. F. Gooden
RAF Turnhouse	No. 65 Sqn	Spitfire	YT		RAF Turnhouse	Sqn Ldr A. L. Holland
RAF Turnhouse	No. 141 Sqn	Defiant	TW		RAF Turnhouse	Sqn Ldr W. A. Richardson
RAF Turnhouse	No. 111 Sqn	Hurricane	JU	WAGON	RAF Drem	Sqn Ldr John Thompson DFC
RAF Turnhouse	No. 263 Sqn	Hurricane, Whirlwind	HE		RAF Drem	Fg Off T. P. Pugh
RAF Dyce	No. 145 Sqn	Hurricane	SO	PATIN	RAF Roborough	Sqn Ldr John Peel
RAF Wick	No. 232 Sqn	Hurricane	EF		RAF Roborough	Fg OffMichael Stephens
RAF Aldergrove	No. 245 Sqn	Hurricane	DX		RAF Roborough	Sqn Ldr E. W. Whitley
RAF Biggin Hill	No.610 Sqn	Spitfire	DW		RAF Biggin Hill	Sqn Ldr John Ellis

== See also ==
- RAF Fighter Command
- List of Royal Air Force aircraft squadrons
- List of Officially Accredited Battle of Britain Squadrons
- List of RAF aircrew in the Battle of Britain
- Luftwaffe order of battle August 1940
