= List of Battle of Britain airfields =

Airfields used by the Royal Air Force in 1940

RAF Fighter Command
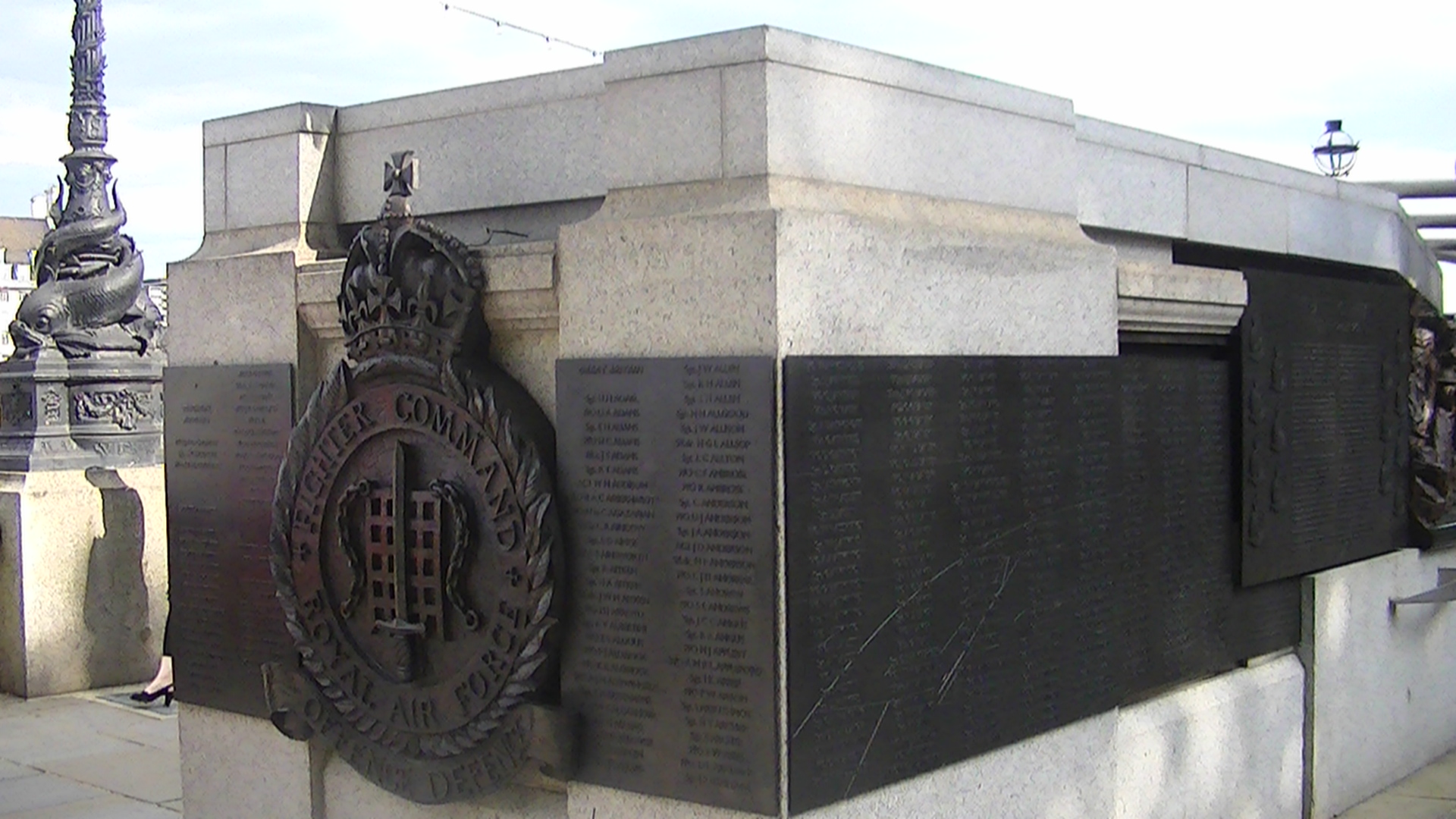
- Battle of Britain Monument, Victoria Embankment, London
- Country: United Kingdom
- Branch: Royal Air Force
- Role: Defence of Great Britain
- Engagements: Battle of Britain

During the Battle of Britain, the defence of the UK's airspace was divided up within RAF Fighter Command into four Groups, each comprising several airfields and squadrons.

The groups involved, 10, 11, 12 and 13, saw very different levels of activity during the battle. No. 11 Group, responsible for the defence of London and the south-east saw the heaviest fighting, and pilots were often rotated among the groups to allow them to rest and recuperate after several weeks of fierce contact with the enemy. Each group was commanded by an Air Vice-Marshal, who served under the head of Fighter Command during the battle, Air Chief Marshal Hugh Dowding.

== Organisational structure ==
Key:

- HQ = Group headquarters
- SS = Sector station
- SA = Satellite aerodrome

=== 10 Group ===
10 Group defended Wales and the West Country and was commanded by Air Vice-Marshal Sir Quintin Brand.

Station name	BoB role	Grid reference	Station opened	Flying ceased	RAF station closed	Current use
RAF Box	HQ	ST843707	1940	N/A	2000	Decommissioned, in use by Defence Equipment & Support
RAF Middle Wallop	SS	SU306385	1940	-	1 September 1957	2 (Training) Regiment Army Air Corps and School of Army Aviation
RAF Filton	SS	ST590802	1916	2012	1960s	Bristol Filton Airport
RAF Boscombe Down	SA	SU176393	1939	-		MoD Boscombe Down
RAF Colerne	SA	ST800712	1940	-		21st Signal Regiment, Bristol University Air Squadron, 3 AEF
RAF Exeter	SA	SY002937	1937	-		Exeter International Airport, The Hunter Flying Club
RAF Pembrey	SA	SN403042	1939	-	1957	Pembrey Airport, Pembrey Sands AWR Support, Pembrey Circuit
RAF Roborough	SA	SX504902	1931	2011		Plymouth City Airport
RAF St Eval	SA	SW873685	1939	1959	6 March 1959	RAF St Eval HIVE, MOD Ariel Field
RAF Warmwell	SA	SY756887	1937	1945		Crossways village

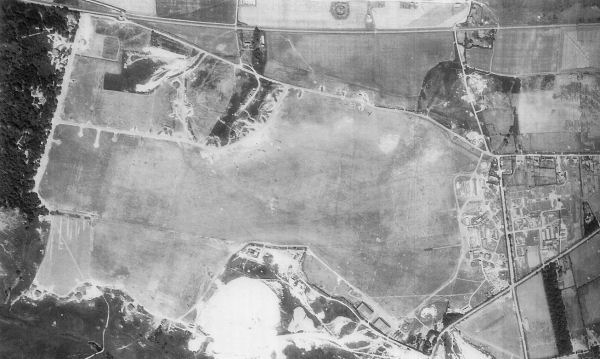
RAF Warmwell in 1943

=== 11 Group ===
11 Group covered the southeast of England and the critical approaches to London and was commanded by Air Vice-Marshal Keith Park.

Station name	BoB role	Grid reference	Station opened	Flying ceased	RAF station closed	Current use
RAF Uxbridge	HQ	TQ061836	1918 (Note: From 1915–1918 Hillingdon House (the estate of which became RAF Uxbridge) was used as a convalescence home for Canadian troops)	N/A	31 March 2010	Battle of Britain Bunker remains open. Hillingdon House, the HQ of 11 Fighter Group, to be refurbished as restaurant
RAF Biggin Hill	SS	TQ416610	1916 (Note: Opened as a wireless testing station. Flying commenced in 1918.)	-	1992	London Biggin Hill Airport, Planned heritage site & conservation area
RAF Debden	SS	TL562350	1937	1960	21 August 1974	33 Engineer Regt EOD, NATS Radar Station
RAF Hornchurch	SS	TQ532846	1915	1962	July 1962	Hornchurch Country Park, Housing Estate, Conservation Area
RAF Kenley	SS	TQ329579	1917		1959	Housing and conservation area
RAF Northolt	SS	TQ097850	1915	-	-	Current RAF Station, HQ Music Services, 63 Squadron, RAF Regt (QCS)
RAF North Weald	SS	TL488047	1916	-	1964	North Weald Airfield
RAF Tangmere	SS	SU909060	1917		16 October 1970	Tangmere Military Aviation Museum
RAF Croydon	SA	TQ310636	1939	30 September 1959	1946	Business park, museum
RAF Detling	SA	TQ813597				Light industry, agriculture
RAF Eastchurch	SA	TQ982701				HM Prison Swaleside
RAF Ford	SA	SU993028				HM Prison Ford
RAF Gosport	SA	SU592006				HMS Sultan, Rowner Housing Estate
RAF Gravesend	SA	TQ670716				Riverview Housing Estate, Golf Course, Cascades Leisure Centre
RAF Hawkinge	SA	TR211395				Kent BoB Museum, Housing
RAF Hendon	SA	TQ217905	1908	1957	1987	RAF Museum, Hendon Police College, Grahame Park Housing Estate
RNAS Lee-on-Solent	SA	SU561020	1917	-	29 March 1996	HM Coastguard, Unlicensed Private Airfield, Maritime & Aviation Industry
RAF Lympne	SA	TR114353	1916	1984	1 January 1946	Industrial Park
RAF Manston	SA	TR334663	1916	-	31 March 1999	Kent International Airport, Defence Fire Training and Development Centre
RAF Martlesham Heath	SA	TM242454	1917		1963	Major British Telecom site. Control Tower Museum – 14.00 to 16.45 each Sunday April until October, 3 Memorials at Barrack Square. see www.mhas.gov.uk or Facebook – Martlesham Heath Aviation Society and Control Tower Museum.
RAF Rochford	SA	TQ866308	1939	-	1946	Now London Southend Airport
RAF Stapleford Tawney	SA	TQ491399				Stapleford Aerodrome
RAF Thorney Island	SA	SU762025	1938			
RAF Westhampnett	SA	SU873180				Goodwood Circuit
RAF West Malling	SA	TQ680555	1930		1969	Kings Hill a mixed development of (eventually) around 2,500 homes and 1 million square feet (93,000 m^{2}) of commercial space.

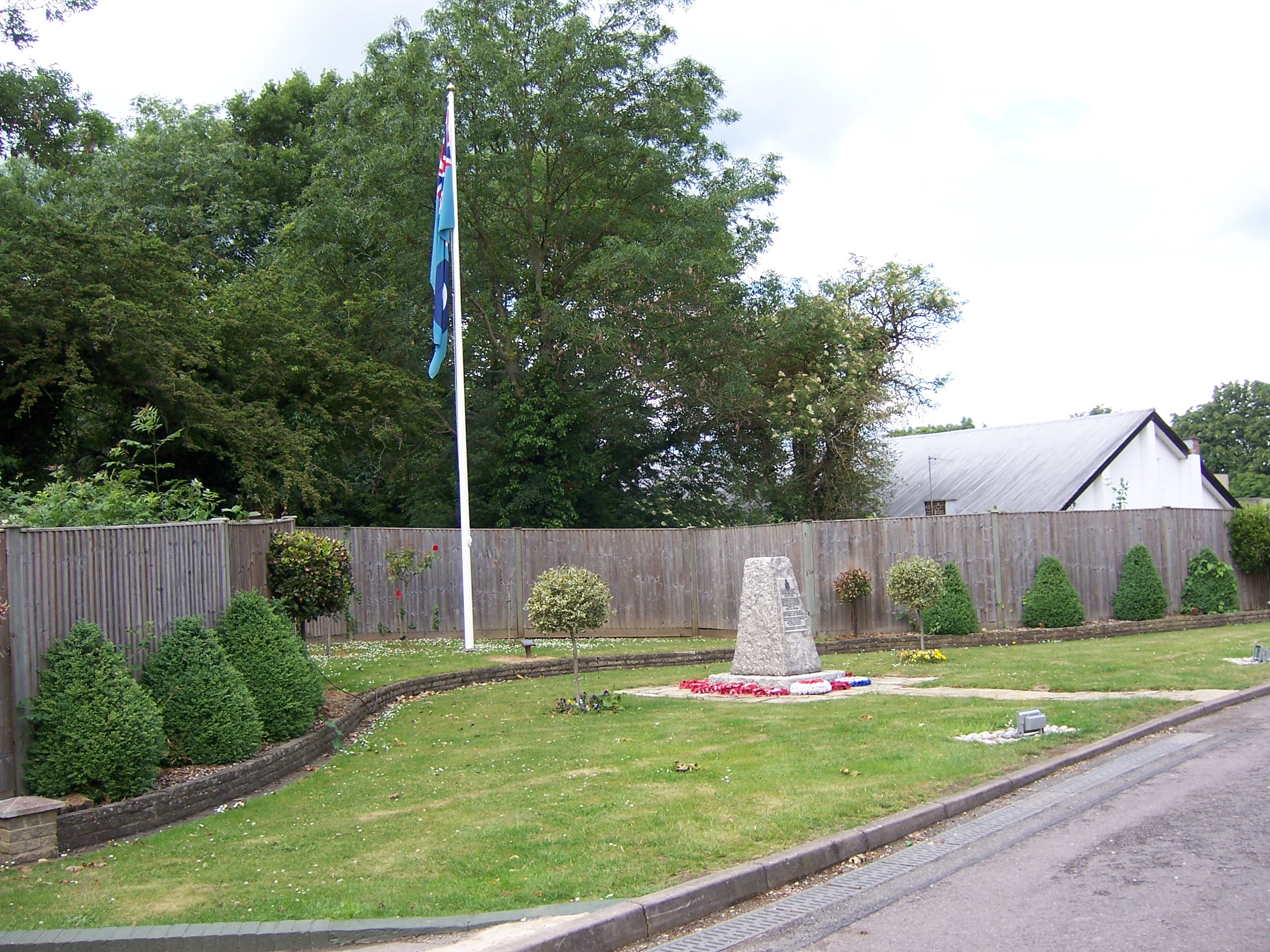
Memorial to the No. 11 Group Operations Room, with the Royal Air Force Ensign, at RAF Uxbridge

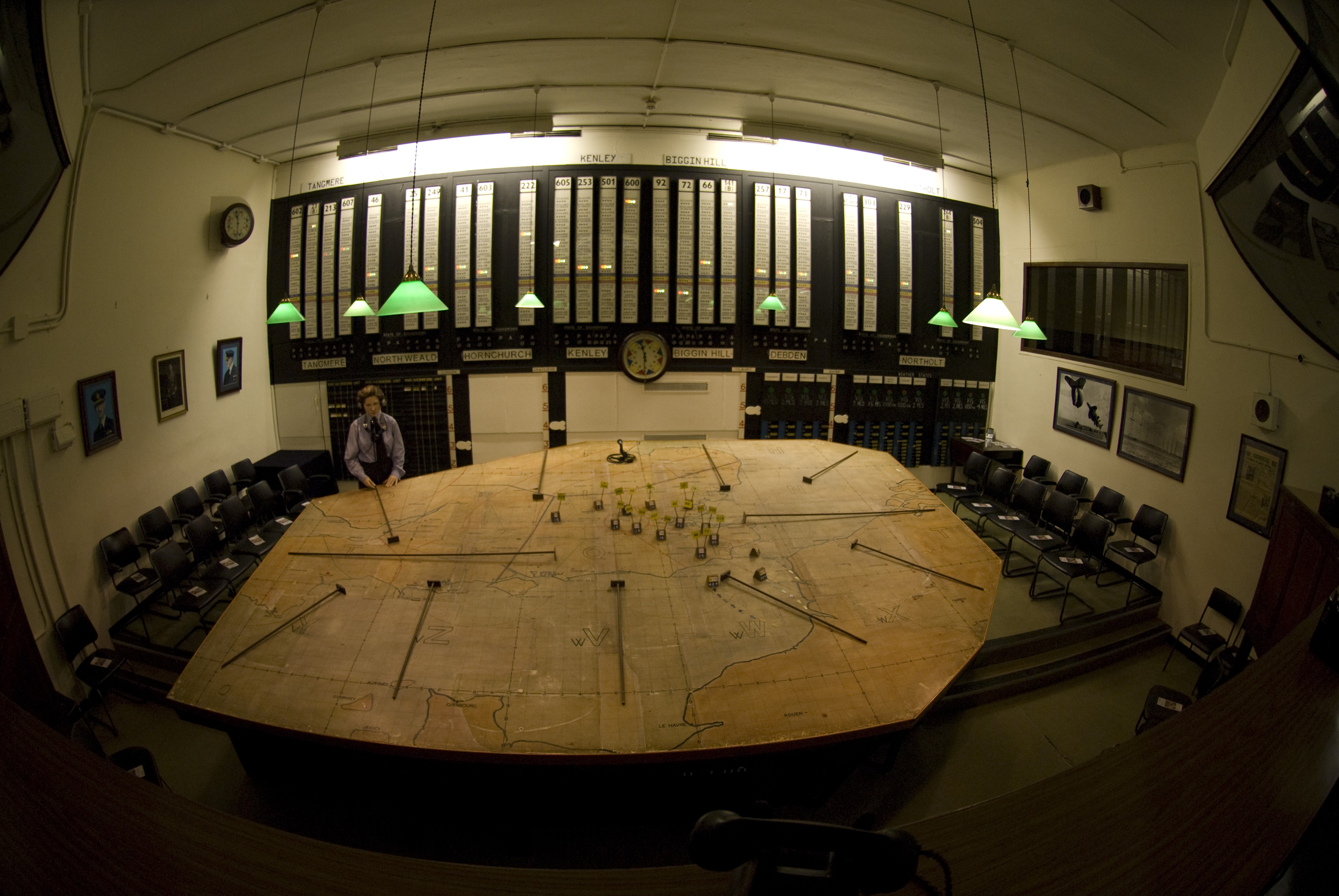
Restored Operations Room at RAF Uxbridge

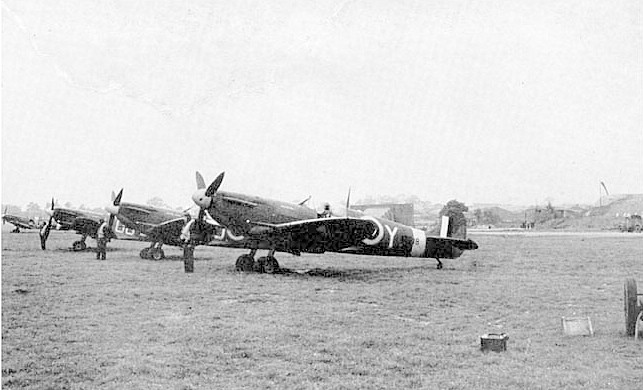
Line up of 485 Squadron 'Subscription' Spitfire Mk. Vbs at RAF Kenley in 1941

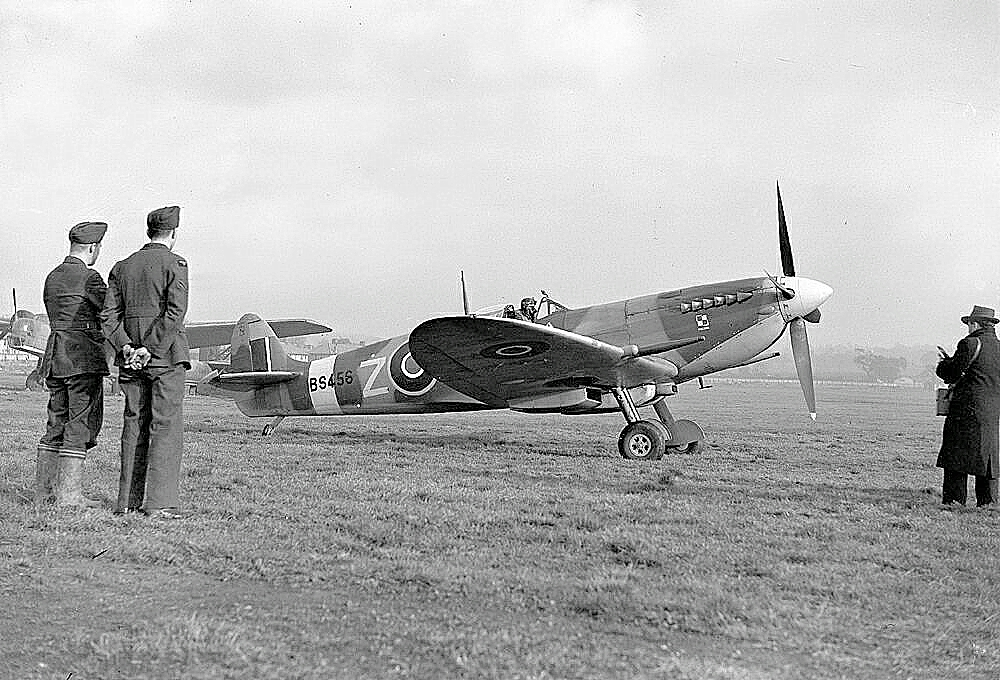
BS456 UZ-Z of 306 (Polish) Torunski Squadron, RAF Northolt, November 1942

=== 12 Group ===
12 Group defended the Midlands and East Anglia and was led by Air Vice-Marshal Trafford Leigh-Mallory.

Station name	BoB role	Grid reference	Station opened	Flying ceased	RAF station closed	Current use
RAF Watnall	HQ	SK 506 454	1940	N/A		Housing / industrial / Nature Reserve (Note: Some underground buildings still exist, but are inaccessible.)
RAF Church Fenton	SS	SE 530 380	1 April 1937	19 December 2013		Leeds East Airport
RAF Digby	SS	TF 048 560				
RAF Duxford	SS	TL 458 460	1918	1961		Imperial War Museum Duxford
RAF Kirton in Lindsey	SS	SK 943 970				
RAF Wittering	SS	TF 031 027	1916			Expeditionary Engineering and Logistics. Flying training with elements of 3 Flying Training School and 6 Flying Training School.
RAF Collyweston	SA	TF 014 016	1916		1942	Merged with the neighbouring RAF Wittering when a 2-mile long grass runway was built linking the two airfields in 1942
RAF Coltishall	SA	TG 270 225				HM Prison Bure, industrial use, solar farm
RAF Fowlmere	SA	TL 410 447	1918			Fowlmere Airfield
RAF Leconfield	SA	TA 030 435				Defence School of Transport (part of Defence College of Logistic, Policing, and Administration)
RAF Tern Hill	SA	SJ 640 305				

=== 13 Group ===
13 Group covered the north of England, Scotland and Northern Ireland and was commanded by Air Vice-Marshal Richard Saul.

Station name	BoB role	Grid reference	Station ppened	Flying ceased	RAF station closed	Current use
RAF Newcastle	HQ					Housing Estate
RAF Acklington	SS	NU230010	1938		1972	HMP Acklington
RAF Dyce	SS					Aberdeen Airport
RAF Turnhouse	SS	NT156734	1916			Edinburgh Airport
RAF Usworth	SS	NZ340585	1916			Factory for Nissan cars
RAF Wick	SS	ND363527	1939		1978	Wick Airport
RAF Catterick	SA	SE250968	1914			Part of the Catterick Garrison complex.
RAF Drem	SA	NT505810	1917		1946	Decommissioned
RAF Grangemouth	SA	NS946820	1939		1945	
RAF Kirkwall	SA					
RAF Sumburgh	SA					Sumburgh Airport
RAF Castletown	SA	ND220668	1940	1944	1945	

== See also ==
- List of Battle of Britain squadrons
- List of former Royal Air Force stations
- List of Royal Air Force stations
- Luftwaffe order of battle August 1940
- RAF Fighter Command order of battle 1940
