= Raigmore House =

Country house in Inverness, Scotland

Raigmore House
- Near Inverness in Scotland
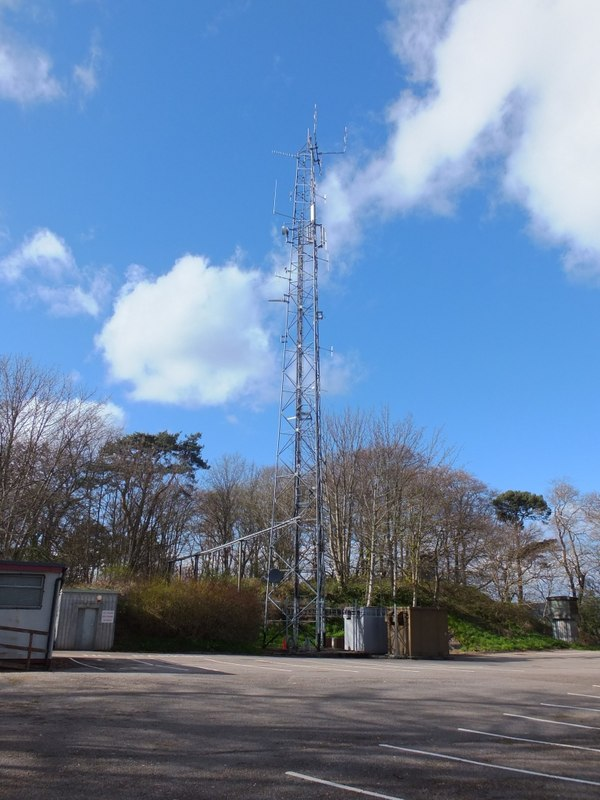
- Communications mast dating from the period when the estate was used by the RAF; the filter room bunker was in the mound behind the mast

Site information
- Type: Royal Air Force station
- Owner: Air Ministry
- Operator: Royal Air Force

Location
- Location within Invernesshire
- Coordinates: 57.48158°N 4.19903°W

Site history
- Built: 1940
- In use: 1941-1943
- Battles/wars: Second World War

Garrison information
- Occupants: No. 14 Group RAF

Raigmore House was a country house in Raigmore, Inverness.

== History ==
The house was designed by Archibald Simpson and constructed for Lachlan Mackintosh of Raigmore, a merchant who had returned from Calcutta, in about 1810. On Lachlan Mackintosh's death in 1845, the estate passed to Aeneas Mackintosh, his son. The site was requisitioned for military use in June 1940 during the Second World War: the house itself became the officers mess for the headquarters of No. 14 Group RAF in 1941; the Operations Centre of No. 14 Group RAF was housed there in three buildings (Operations Room, Filter Room and Communications Centre), which were partially buried for protection, in a similar way to buildings for No. 9 Group RAF at RAF Barton Hall, No. 10 Group RAF at RAF Box, No. 11 Group RAF at RAF Uxbridge, No. 12 Group RAF at RAF Watnall and No. 13 Group RAF at RAF Newcastle. Much of the remainder of the site was used to create an Emergency Hospital Service facility which evolved to become Raigmore Hospital.

After No. 14 Group was disbanded in 1943, the house became the local headquarters for the Royal Auxiliary Air Force. Meanwhile, the filter room bunker was used by the Civil Defence Corps from 1958 and by the Royal Observer Corps from 1968; it was acquired by Highland Council for use as their emergency centre in 1988. The operations room bunker and the communications centre bunker have both been demolished since the war. The filter bunker is new classified as a Historic Listed Building.

In 2016 the filter room bunker was put up for sale by the Highland Regional Council. It has moved into private hands and is now owned by CSP Partnership. Change of use planning permission has been applied for to allow part of the building to be developed as a private museum.

The house itself was decommissioned in 1957 and demolished in 1965: that part of the site has since been redeveloped for housing.
