= RAF Barton Hall =

Former RAF station in Lancashire, England

RAF Barton Hall (RAF Longley Lane)
- Near Barton, Lancashire in England
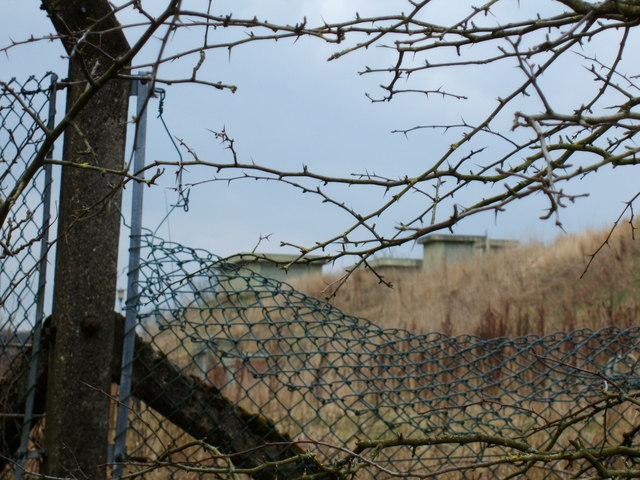
- The former operations bunker at Langley Lane, Goosnargh

Site information
- Type: Royal Air Force station / Headquarters
- Owner: Air Ministry
- Operator: Royal Air Force

Location
- Shown within the City of Preston RAF Barton Hall (the United Kingdom)
- Coordinates: 53°49′09″N 002°43′42″W

Site history
- Built: 1786
- In use: 1940-1975
- Battles/wars: Second World War

Garrison information
- Occupants: No. 9 Group RAF

Royal Air Force Barton Hall or more simply RAF Barton Hall is a former Royal Air Force station situated between the villages of Barton and Broughton, near Preston, Lancashire, England.

== History ==
Barton Hall, which replaced an old manor house, was built for the Shuttleworth family in about 1750. In 1939 part of the estate was requisitioned for military use. During the Second World War, the Operations Centre of No. 9 Group RAF was housed there in three buildings (Operations Room, Filter Room and Communications Centre), which were partially buried for protection, in a similar way to buildings for No. 10 Group RAF at RAF Box, No. 11 Group RAF at RAF Uxbridge, No. 12 Group RAF at RAF Watnall, No. 13 Group RAF at RAF Newcastle and No. 14 Group RAF at Raigmore House in Inverness.

Operations room (53.823°N 2.701°W)
The operations room, responsible for directing RAF aircraft in the No. 9 Group area, was located in a bunker on Langley Lane, Goosnargh, 1 mile (2 km) east of Barton Hall. After the war the Royal Observer Corps 21 Group Headquarters and the Western Sector Control of the United Kingdom Warning and Monitoring Organisation took over the bunker. In the bunker was the standby national control of the famous Four-minute warning air raid warning system for the UK. The ROC and UKWMO were disbanded between 1991 and 1995 and the bunker was closed.

Filter room (53.820°N 2.686°W)
The Filter room, responsible for filtering large quantities of intelligence on enemy activity before it was passed to the operations room, was located in a bunker on the south side of Whittingham Lane, a little further east. The Filter room contained a map table showing the British coast from north Wales through western Scotland. One of the WAAF officers in the Barton Hall Filter Room, Eileen Younghusband recorded her experiences there in "One Woman's War."

Communications room (53.819°N 2.728°W)
The communications room, responsible for accommodating all the communications equipment, was located on Brass Pan Lane, north of Broughton. The communications bunker is currently used to store farm machinery.

After the war, Barton Hall itself was the site of the Preston Air Traffic Control Centre which provided the Area Control service between N52.30 and N55.00, with London ATCC (at Heathrow and later West Drayton) to the South and Scottish ATCC (at Prestwick) to the North. The unit closed in 1975, its task having been absorbed by London ATCC and Manchester Sub-centre situated at Manchester Airport.
