= Eileen Younghusband (WAAF officer) =

British Air Force officer

- Born: Eileen Muriel Le Croissette; 4 July 1921; London, England, UK
- Died: 2 September 2016 (aged 95); Cardiff, Wales, UK
- Education: Open University
- Spouse: Peter Younghusband (m. 1944)
- Children: 1
- Military career
- Allegiance: United Kingdom
- Branch: Women's Auxiliary Air Force
- Rank: Section officer
- Service number: 3861
- Units: No. 10 Group RAF; No. 9 Group RAF; RAF Second Tactical Air Force (2TAF)
- Awards: British Empire Medal

Eileen Muriel Younghusband, BEM (née Le Croissette; 4 July 1921 – 2 September 2016) was a filter officer in the Women's Auxiliary Air Force in World War II. She worked in the filter room, a top-level British air defence hub which assessed radar reports in order to give air raid warnings. Later, while posted to Belgium, she was part of a team of mathematicians who alerted Allied forces to the location of V-2 rocket launch sites.

Younghusband completed a university degree at the age of 87 and subsequently published three books about her wartime experiences: two memoirs and one children's book.

== Early life ==
Eileen Le Croissette was born in London in 1921. She left school shortly after her 16th birthday and worked in the head office of Scottish Provident in London, who provided life assurance. She worked as an au pair in France after her German teacher suggested she gain experience in speaking French and German to help set up his new business, the 'School Travel Service'.

She worked for the Boucher family until Hitler remilitarised the Rhineland, when she returned home. On this journey she encountered many fleeing Jews.

Upon her return, she worked for Corke Sons & Co. as a secretary. Whilst working here, she visited Germany in the summer of 1939. She went to a paper factory connected to her employers but also to a professor known to her German teacher, as she still had hope of the School Travel Service. She returned in early August 1939, 3 weeks before war began.

=== War begins ===
Eileen Le Croissette was invited back to work at Scottish Provident, after conscription led to a shortage of men, and was a valued employee, with rooms in the city.

Le Croissette experienced the first Blitz on 24 August 1940. This led to her deciding to join the WAAF.

== Wartime service ==
Eileen Le Croissette joined the Women's Auxiliary Air Force (WAAF) in 1941 at the age of 19, and was trained at RAF Innsworth, near Gloucester, and RAF Leighton Buzzard. Commissioned as an assistant section officer in November 1941, and promoted to section officer in October 1942, she was posted to 10 Group Fighter Command at RAF Rudloe Manor, Corsham, near Bath, where she was deployed as a filter officer.

In this post, she was responsible for assessing the information gleaned from Chain Home coastal radar stations, estimating position, height and number of enemy forces in the air – essential for establishing Britain's defence network and giving air raid warnings. These teams had a matter of seconds to calculate accurately the whereabouts of both friendly and enemy aircraft. This information was essential since the RAF had a limited number of fighter aircraft and trained pilots, and limited supplies of fuel.

After further training at RAF Bawdsey, she went to 9 Group, RAF Barton Hall, and then to Fighter Command headquarters at RAF Bentley Priory, Stanmore. In 1944, she was posted to 33 Wing, RAF Second Tactical Air Force at Mechelen (Malines), Belgium, with a small team of women using their mathematical skills to detect the mobile launchers of the V-2 rockets aimed at London and the vital port of Antwerp. "Our job was to extrapolate the curve of the V-2 from the place it landed back to the launch site, and we did that once we knew the fall of shot and we got the position of the top of curve, we then used a slide rule in geometry to find the launch site," she told the BBC. Allied aircraft could then bomb the launch vehicles. She remained at Mechelen until June 1945.

Following VE Day she was seconded to the Breendonk concentration camp, where she acted as a guide and interpreter (she was a fluent French speaker), relaying to RAF personnel the realities of war. She resigned her commission on 14 December 1945 and moved into hotel work.

== Later years ==
Younghusband graduated from the Open University at the age of 87, and wrote two volumes of memoirs, Not an Ordinary Life (2009) and One Woman's War (2011), the latter dealing more specifically with her wartime experience. She later adapted her books for children and in 2016, just weeks before her death, her children's book Eileen's War was published.

=== Recognition ===
Younghusband campaigned on health and education issues, such as cuts to adult education, and she was awarded the British Empire Medal in the 2013 New Year Honours for services to lifelong learning. Britain's Got Talent finalist Nathan Wyburn created a portrait of Younghusband from wartime images of her to commemorate her World War II work.

A life-size statue of Younghusband as a young WAAF officer stands in a replica filter room at the Battle of Britain Museum at Bentley Priory.

== Personal life and death ==
Younghusband married physical training instructor Peter Younghusband in 1944 and they had a son, Clive, in 1946.

In 1984 Younghusband moved to Wales. She died in hospital in Cardiff on 2 September 2016, at the age of 95.

== Publications ==
- —— (2009). Not an Ordinary Life. Cardiff Centre for Lifelong Learning. ISBN 978-0-9561156-9-0.
- —— (2013). One Woman's War. Cardiff Bay: Candy Jar Books. ISBN 978-0-9571548-3-4.
- —— (2016). Eileen's War. Illustrated by Jason Goy. Candy Jar Books.
