= RAF Watnall =

Former Royal Air Force group headquarters in Nottinghamshire, England

RAF Watnall
- Watnall, Nottinghamshire in England
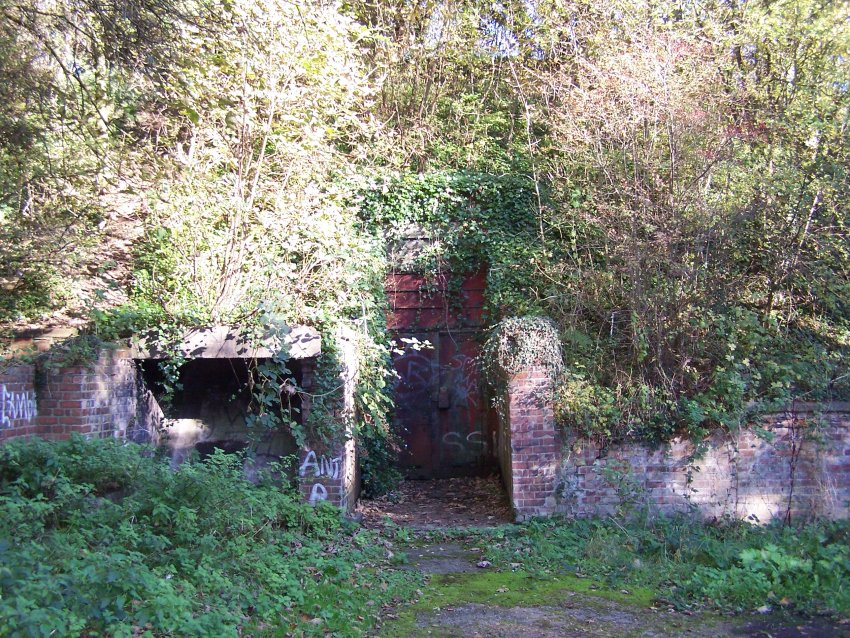
- Entrance to the Filter Bunker

Site information
- Type: Royal Air Force station
- Owner: Air Ministry
- Operator: Royal Air Force

Location
- Shown within Nottinghamshire
- Coordinates: 53.006°N 1.247°W

Site history
- Built: 1939
- In use: 1939-1945
- Battles/wars: Second World War

Garrison information
- Occupants: No. 12 Group RAF

RAF Watnall was the operational headquarters of No. 12 Group, RAF Fighter Command at Watnall in Nottinghamshire, England.

== History ==
The station was established during the Second World War in Spring 1940 to act as headquarters for No. 12 Group whose area encompassed the Midlands, Norfolk, Lincolnshire and North Wales. The Operations Centre of No. 12 Group was housed there in three buildings (Operations Room, Filter Room and Communications Centre), which were partially buried for protection, in a similar way to buildings for No. 9 Group RAF at RAF Barton Hall, No. 10 Group at RAF Box, No. 11 Group at RAF Uxbridge, No. 13 Group RAF at RAF Newcastle and No. 14 Group RAF at Raigmore House.

Operations room (53.006°N 1.251°W)
The operations room, responsible for directing RAF aircraft in the No. 12 Group area, was located in a bunker on the east side of the main road in Watnall. It was fully operational by 1940 and closed in 1946. It is now flooded and the site above is now occupied by a vehicle testing centre.

Filter room (53.003°N 1.247°W)
The Filter room, responsible for filtering large quantities of intelligence on enemy activity before it was passed to the operations room, was located in a bunker .3 miles (0.48 km) further south on a sunken road off the main road in Watnall. It did not open until 1943. After the war it continued to be used as an early warning centre until it closed in 1961. The filter block was sold by auction in 2008 and is now being redeveloped as a hotel. An episode of The Restoration Man presented by George Clarke, which was aired on Channel 4 on 12 February 2014, described the progress of the development.

The Communications centre has not been found.

== RAF units and aircraft ==
Unit	Dates	Notes
No. 12 Group	1940-1946	Part of Fighter Command
No. 81 (Training) Group	1952-1952	Controlled Fighter Command training units

== See also ==
- Battle of Britain
- List of Battle of Britain airfields
- List of Battle of Britain squadrons
- Watnall railway station
