= RAF Blakelaw =

Former Royal Air Force station in Tyne and Wear, England

RAF Blakelaw
- Near Kenton Bar, Tyne and Wear in England
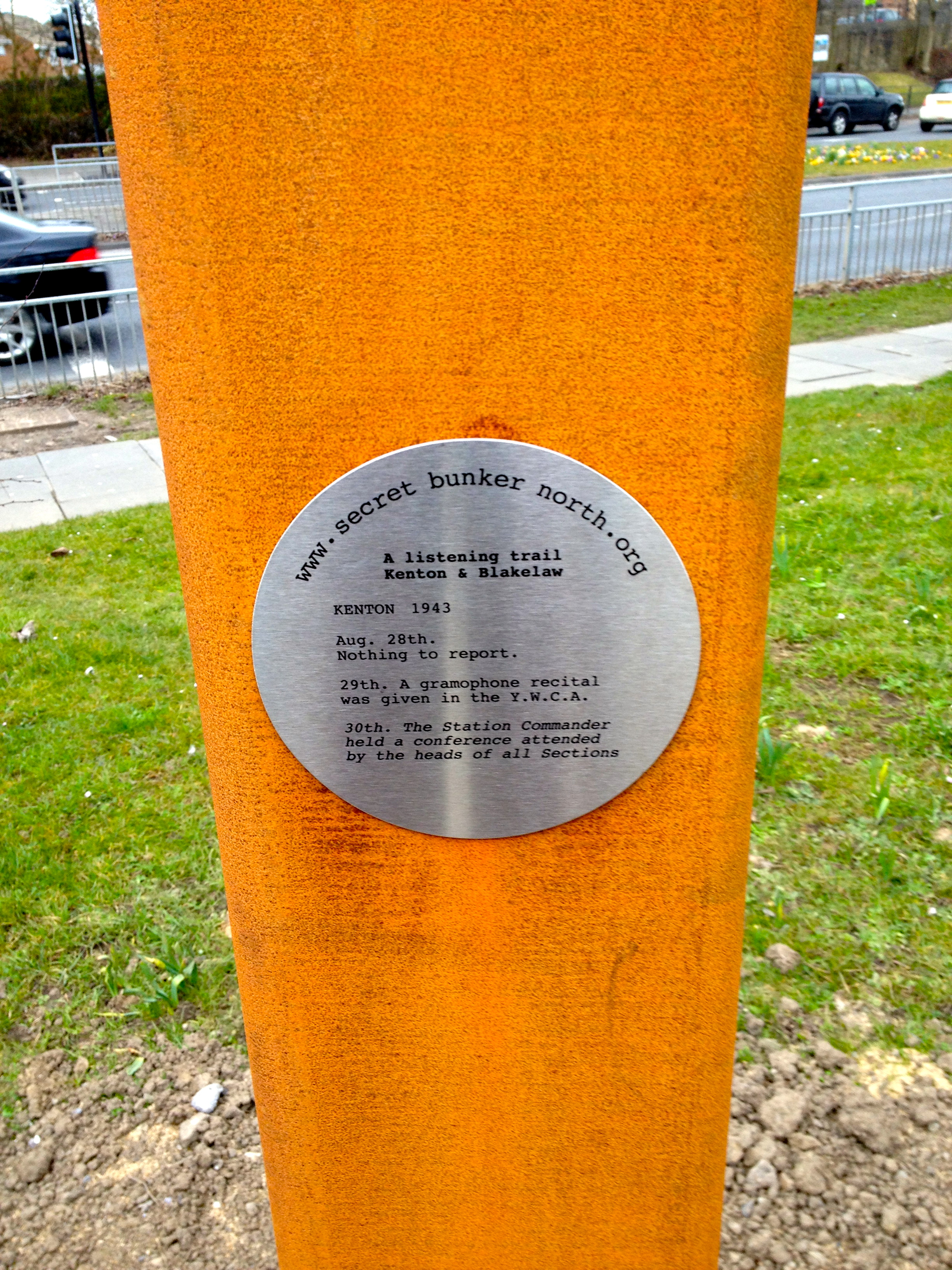
- Plaque commemorating the bunkers at Kenton and Blakelaw

Site information
- Type: Royal Air Force station
- Owner: Air Ministry
- Operator: Royal Air Force

Location
- Shown within Tyne and Wear
- Coordinates: 55.0002°N 1.6633°W

Site history
- Built: 1939
- In use: 1939-1945
- Battles/wars: Second World War

Garrison information
- Occupants: No. 13 Group RAF

RAF Blakelaw (sometimes known as RAF Newcastle) was a Royal Air Force station which acted as headquarters for No.13 Group during the Second World War and which was located in Blakelaw, Northumberland (now a suburb of Newcastle upon Tyne).

== Function ==
The station was established in Spring 1940 to act as headquarters for No.13 Group whose area encompassed North of the Humber and all of Scotland. The Operations Centre of No. 13 Group was housed there in three buildings (Operations Room, Filter Room and Communications Centre), which were partially buried for protection, in a similar way to buildings for No. 9 Group RAF at RAF Barton Hall, No. 10 Group RAF at RAF Box, No. 11 Group RAF at RAF Uxbridge, No. 12 Group RAF at RAF Watnall and No. 14 Group RAF at Raigmore House. No.13 Group merged with No. 14 Group in July 1943.

Operations room (grid reference NZ 21639 67345, 55.0002°N 1.6633°W)
The operations room, responsible for directing RAF aircraft in the No. 13 Group area, was located in a bunker at Kenton Bar. It was fully operational by December 1939. When No.13 Group merged with No. 14 Group in July 1943 the operations room was converted for use as a sector operations room and continued in that use until Summer 1945. The operations room was used as a regional war room from the early 1950s until the early 1960s.

Filter room (grid reference NZ 21400 66900, 54.995880°N 1.670103°W)
The Filter room, responsible for filtering large quantities of intelligence on enemy activity before it was passed to the operations room, was located in a bunker at Blakelaw Quarry. It was fully operational by late 1940. When No.13 Group merged with No. 14 Group in July 1943 the filter room was taken out of use. The filter room was acquired by Newcastle City Council and was used as a civil defence centre from 1952 until 1968.

The Communications centre has not been found.

== See also ==
- List of former Royal Air Force stations
- No. 13 Group RAF
- Kenton, Newcastle upon Tyne
