= RAF Rudloe Manor =

Former Royal Air Force station in Wiltshire, England

RAF Rudloe Manor
- Corsham, Wiltshire, England
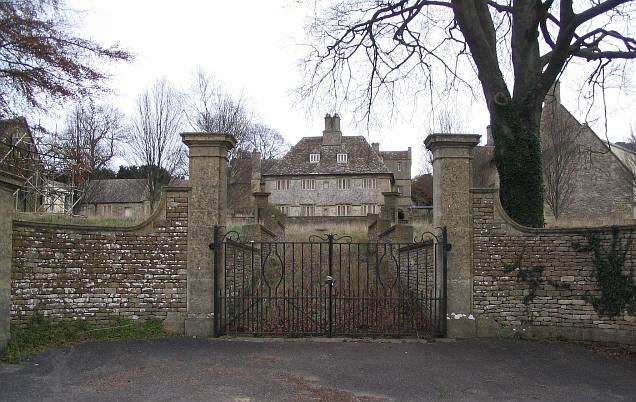
- Rudloe Manor main house

Site information
- Owner: Private, Military
- Open to the public: No
- Condition: Standing

Location
- Shown within Wiltshire
- Coordinates: 51°25′14.28″N 2°13′0.70″W

Site history
- In use: 1939–2000
- Battles/wars: Second World War

Garrison information
- Occupants: No. 10 Group RAF

RAF Rudloe Manor, formerly RAF Box, was a Royal Air Force station north-east of Bath, England, between the settlements of Box and Corsham, in Wiltshire. It was one of several military installations in the area and covered three dispersed sites. Parts of the site are now used by Defence Digital within the MoD Corsham complex; other areas are vacant and some have been sold, including the 17th-century manor house, Rudloe Manor.

== Second World War ==
The station was established on top of quarries from which Bath stone had been extracted. In the 1930s some of the tunnels had been converted for use as a Central Ammunition Depot. The vast caverns had some 2,250,000 square feet (209,000 m^{2}) of space, divided into many smaller chambers.

During the Second World War, the Operations Centre of No. 10 Group RAF was housed there in three buildings (Operations Room, Filter Room and Communications Centre), which were partially buried for protection, in a similar way to buildings for No. 9 Group at RAF Barton Hall, No. 11 Group RAF at RAF Uxbridge, No. 12 Group RAF at RAF Watnall, No. 13 Group RAF at RAF Newcastle and No. 14 Group RAF at Raigmore House in Inverness.

=== Operations room ===
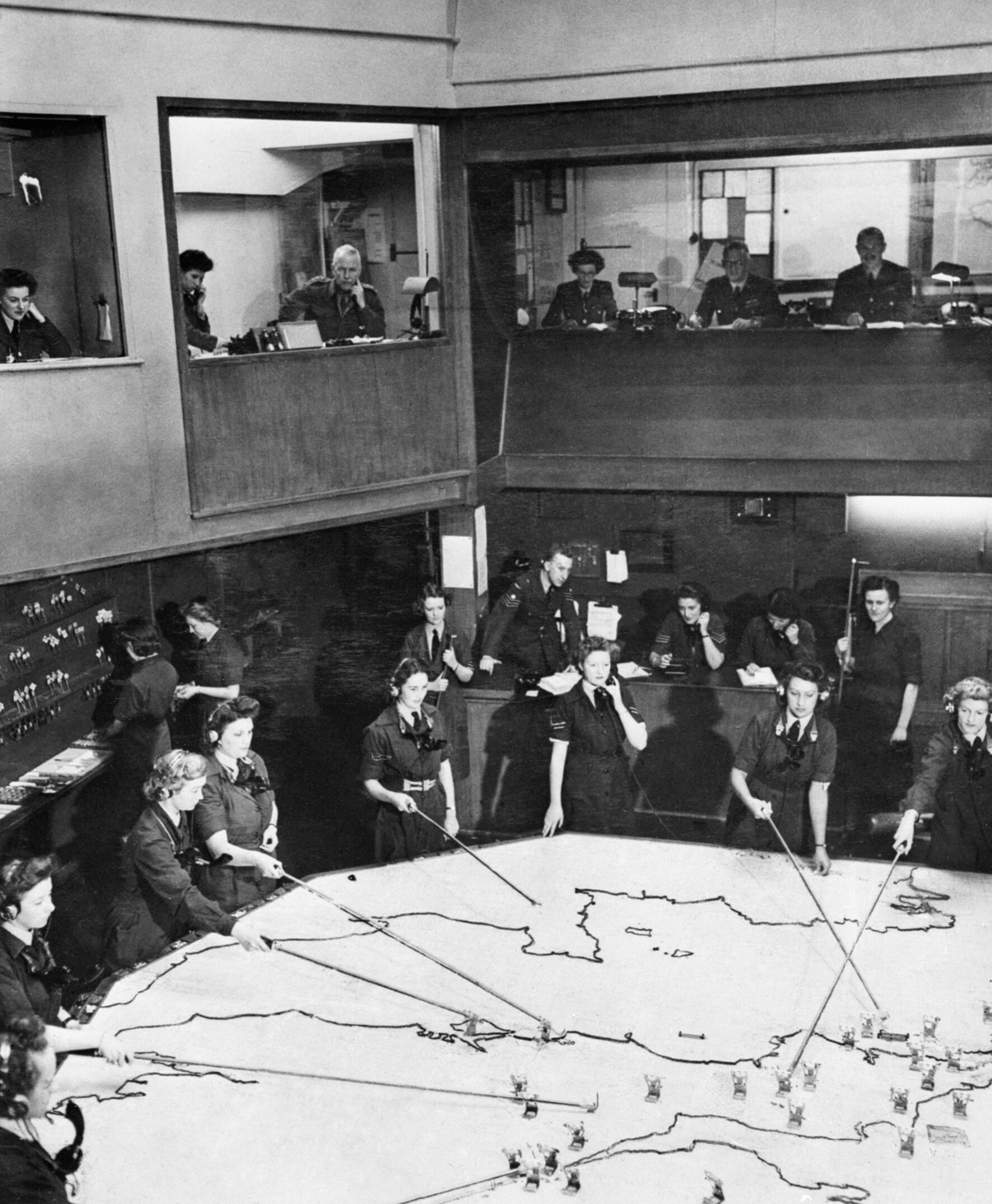
The Rudloe Manor operations room in use in 1943

The operations room, responsible for directing RAF aircraft in the No. 10 Group area, was initially established in a block adjacent to the manor house in June 1940. The area covered by No. 10 Group encompassed South West England and South Wales. Later in the year the operations room was relocated into the north end of an underground bunker in Browns Quarry. The operations room became disused in May 1945 when No. 10 Group was disbanded.

=== Filter room ===
The Filter Room, responsible for filtering large quantities of intelligence on enemy activity before it was passed to the operations room, was located in the south end of the underground bunker in Browns Quarry and became operational in 1940. The filter room became disused in May 1945 when No. 10 Group was disbanded. Eileen Younghusband, who served in various filter rooms, recounted her experiences at Rudloe Manor in her 2011 memoir, One Woman's War.

The Communications centre was located in the west part of the underground bunker in Browns Quarry. The members of the Women's Auxiliary Air Force who staffed the underground bunker were billeted at nearby Hartham Park.

== Units ==
RAF units using the site were:

Unit	Dates	Notes
No. 10 (Fighter) Group RAF	1940–1945	Responsible for the defence of Plymouth and other south west ports, also naval dockyards and channel convoys
Fighter Command Control and Reporting School RAF	1945–1948	
Headquarters Southern Sector RAF	1950–1957	
No. 81 (Training) Group RAF	1952–1958	Fighter Command training group
No. 24 (Training) Group RAF	1958–1973	Part of Training Command, later Technical Training Command; controlled all schools of technical training

== Post-war ==
RAF Rudloe Manor is known as "Britain's Area 51" since declassified secret files released at the National Archives indicated the site was the centre for UFO investigations in the 1950s.

The wider site continued as both a communications hub and home of various administrative units. No.1 Signals Unit was established to manage all UK terrestrial communications infrastructure for the RAF. With the launch of the UK Satellite Communications System, Skynet, in the late 1960s, the site of Controller Defence Communications Network (CDCN) was established. A spacecraft operations centre was established by 1001 Signals Unit, the spacecraft operations organisation, on a small enclave within the site, known as Hawthorn.

The headquarters of the RAF Provost and Security Service was established nearby, although on the closure of the station it moved to RAF Henlow.

RAF Rudloe Manor was the location of Headquarters Southern Area Royal Observer Corps (ROC) from 1952 until 1980, when it was relocated to Lansdown near Bath. Co-located with the ROC was Headquarters Southern Sector United Kingdom Warning and Monitoring Organisation, responsible for the now-defunct four-minute warning in the event of nuclear attack during the Cold War.

The site was adjacent to Basil Hill Barracks, the headquarters of No. 2 Signal Brigade, HMS Royal Arthur and the Royal Naval Stores Depot (RNSD) Copenacre.

== Closure ==
The RAF station was closed in 2000. The Defence Communication Services Agency (DCSA) took responsibility for the sites, subsequently reorganising into the Information Systems & Services cluster in 2008.

== Manor house ==
The manor house known as Rudloe Manor is adjacent to the northern outpost of the site, north of the A4 road at grid reference ST842707. The house dates from the 13th century and was rebuilt c.1685. It was designated as Grade II* listed in 1985 along with a 12th century Tithe Barn to the south-west and 17th century entrance way, both Grade II listed.

In 2021, Rudloe Manor was sold into private ownership and restoration work was undertaken.

== See also ==
- Corsham Computer Centre
- MoD Corsham
