= AHQ Air Defences Eastern Mediterranean =

RAF Command from World War II

- Country: United Kingdom
- Branch: Royal Air Force

Air Headquarters Air Defences Eastern Mediterranean (Air H.Q. Air Defences Eastern Mediterranean or AHQ Air Defences Eastern Mediterranean) was a sub-command of RAF Middle East Command which itself was a sub-command of the Mediterranean Air Command during World War II. Air H.Q. Air Defences Eastern Mediterranean was established on 4 March 1943, by renaming the RAF command known as AHQ Egypt. Air Vice Marshal Richard Saul was the only commander of Air HQ Air Defences Eastern Mediterranean which was renamed Air HQ Eastern Mediterranean on 1 February 1944.

== Order of battle ==
On 10 July 1943, when the Allied forces invaded Sicily (Operation Husky), Air H.Q. Air Defences Eastern Mediterranean consisted of four fighter groups.

Air HQ Air Defences Eastern Mediterranean
Air Vice Marshal Richard Saul
Commanders and Squadron Assignments

No. 209 (Fighter) Group Group Captain R.C.F. Lister	No. 210 (Fighter) Group Group Captain John Grandy	No. 212 (Fighter) Group Air Commodore Archibald Wann	No. 219 (Fighter) Group Group Captain Hon. Max Aitken
No. 46 Squadron RAF Det., Beaufighter	No. 3 Squadron SAAF, Hurricane	No. 7 Squadron SAAF, Hurricane	No. 46 Squadron RAF, Beaufighter
No. 127 Squadron RAF, Hurricane/Spitfire	No. 33 Squadron RAF, Hurricane	No. 41 Squadron SAAF, Hurricane	No. 74 Squadron RAF, Hurricane
	No. 89 Squadron RAF, Beaufighter	No. 80 Squadron RAF, Spitfire	No. 238 Squadron RAF, Hurricane
	No. 213 Squadron RAF, Hurricane	No. 94 Squadron RAF, Hurricane	No. 335 Squadron RAF, Hurricane
	No. 274 Squadron RAF, Hurricane	No. 108 Squadron RAF Det., Beaufighter	No. 336 Squadron RAF, Hurricane
		No. 123 Squadron RAF, Hurricane	No. 451 Squadron RAAF, Hurricane
		No. 134 Squadron RAF, Hurricane	
		No. 237 Squadron RAF, Hurricane	
		No. 1563 Met. Flight, Gladiator	
		No. 1654 Met. Flight, Gladiator	

Notes:
SAAF=South African Air Force; RAAF=Royal Australian Air Forces; Det.=Detachment; Met.=Meteorological.
