= Arthur Bigsworth =

Royal Air Force Air Commodore

Arthur Wellesley Bigsworth
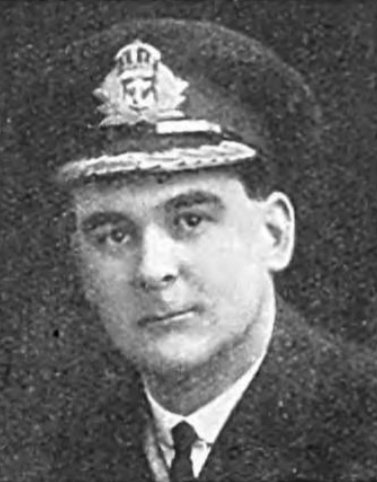
- Born: 27 March 1885; Anerley, Kent
- Died: 24 February 1961 (aged 75); Great Dunmow, Essex
- Military career
- Allegiance: United Kingdom
- Branch: Royal Navy (1909–18); Royal Air Force (1918–35)
- Service years: 1913–1935; 1939
- Rank: Air Commodore
- Commands: No. 42 (Maintenance) Group (1939); RAF Leuchars (1925–28); No. 10 Group (1918–19; 1929–31)
- Conflicts: First World War
- Awards: Companion of the Order of St Michael and St George; Distinguished Service Order & Bar; Air Force Cross; Mentioned in Despatches
- Other work: British Directorate of Aeronautical Production

Arthur Wellesley Bigsworth CMG, DSO & Bar, AFC was an aviator who had a distinguished military career in the service of the British armed forces.

== Career ==
Bigsworth received training as a Mercantile Marine officer, later joining the Royal Naval Reserve as a sub-lieutenant, being promoted to lieutenant on 19 January 1913. He attended the first course at the Central Flying School, gaining his Aviator's Certificate no. 396 on 21 January 1913. He transferred to the Royal Navy at this rank with effect from 1 April 1913, achieving the rank of wing commander in the Royal Naval Air Service on 31 December 1916. On 1 April 1918 he was appointed Officer Commanding No. 10 Group RAF; a year later he was awarded a permanent commission as a lieutenant colonel and was appointed Staff Officer First Class (Air) in Headquarters, Mediterranean District. At this point Bigsworth was awarded a Permanent Commission with the RAF and was removed from the Navy Lists while remaining in his post with HQ Mediterranean District, later HQ Mediterranean Group in 1920. After almost three years as Officer Commanding, Armament and Gunnery School at Eastchurch, he returned to the Mediterranean as Air Officer Commanding (AOC), HQ RAF Mediterranean, in which capacity he was appointed as a member of the Nominated Council of Malta. In 1925 he returned to the UK, first to RAF Leuchars (1925), then as Senior Air Staff Office (SASO), HQ Coastal Area (1928), AOC No. 10 Group and finally, until his retirement in September 1935, as Director of Equipment at the Air Ministry.

Immediately following his retirement from active service, Bigsworth was appointed to the Directorate of Aeronautical Production and in 1939 was for a short time AOC No 42 (Maintenance) Group.

It has been claimed that W. E. Johns based some aspects of his fictional hero Biggles (surname Bigglesworth) on the real-life Bigsworth, with whom he had worked at the Air Ministry.

== Medals and honours ==
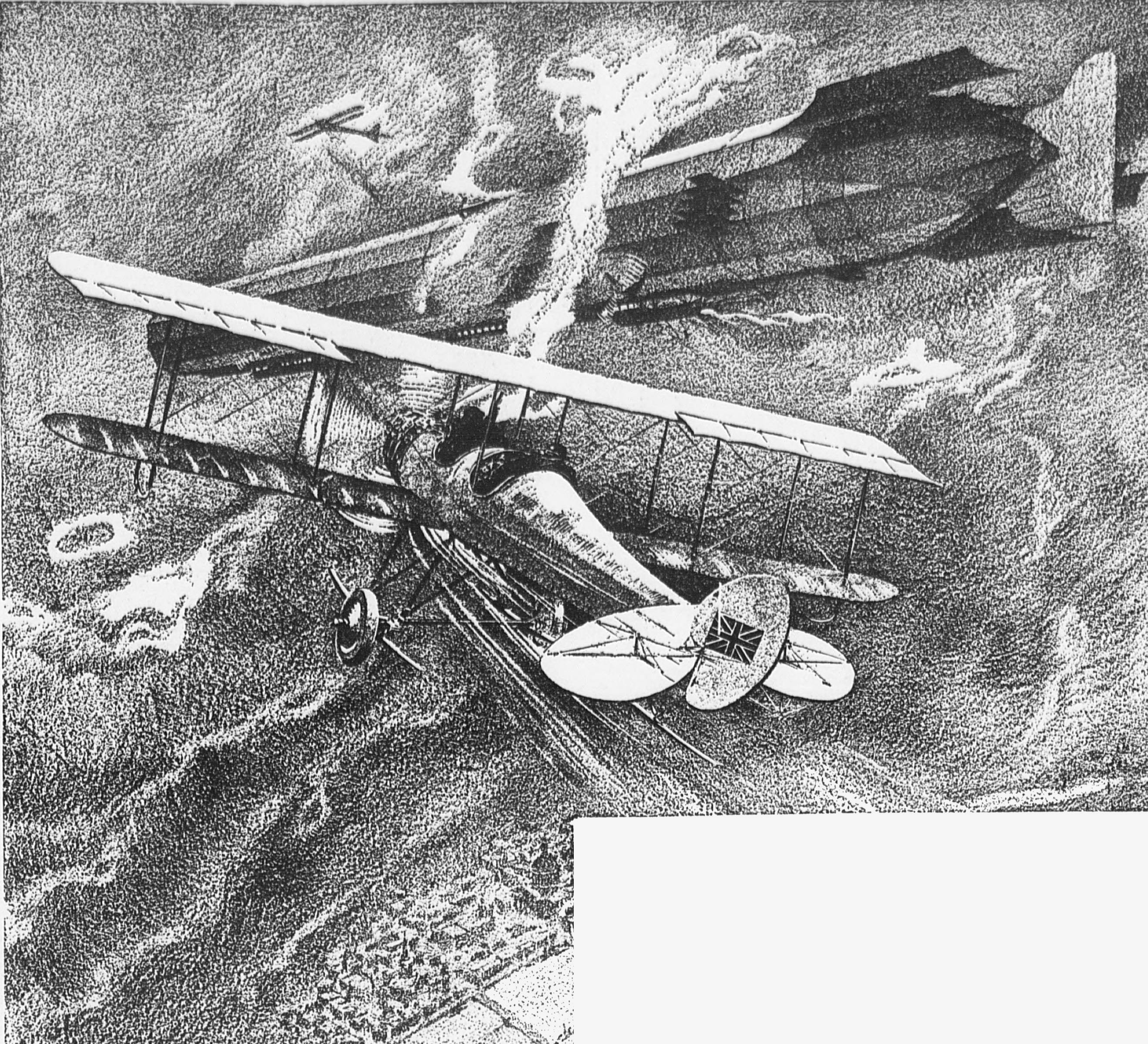
Bigsworth's attack on Zeppelin LZ 39, 17 May 1915

Bigsworth had already experimented with night flying, using two 4V lamps attached to his aircraft and no doubt called on this experience on 17 May 1915, when he managed to climb his Avro 504 above Zeppelin LZ39 over Ostend and drop four 20 lb bombs on its envelope, causing considerable damage. LZ39 managed to return to its base, despite damage to five of its gasbags. For this feat Bigsworth was awarded the Distinguished Service Order (DSO). This was the first night-time attack on a Zeppelin.

On 26 August 1915, Bigsworth was reconnoitering the sea off Ostend in his Farman F.27 when he spotted a German submarine thought to be U-14 on the surface and attacked it, claiming that he saw his target sink. The citation for the Bar to his DSO stated: "Squadron-Commander Bigsworth was under heavy fire from the shore batteries and from the submarine whilst manoeuvring for position. Nevertheless, displaying great coolness, he descended to 500 feet, and after several attempts was able to get a good line for dropping the bombs with full effect." However, the U-boat these reports identified was actually sunk by trawlers before the date of this aerial attack.

Major Bigsworth was further "Mentioned in Despatches and Reports for Distinguished Services" on 3 June 1918.

Lieutenant Colonel (Acting Colonel) Bigsworth was appointed a Companion of the Order of St Michael and St George, followed on 5 June 1919 by the award of the Air Force Cross.

== Bigsworth chart board ==
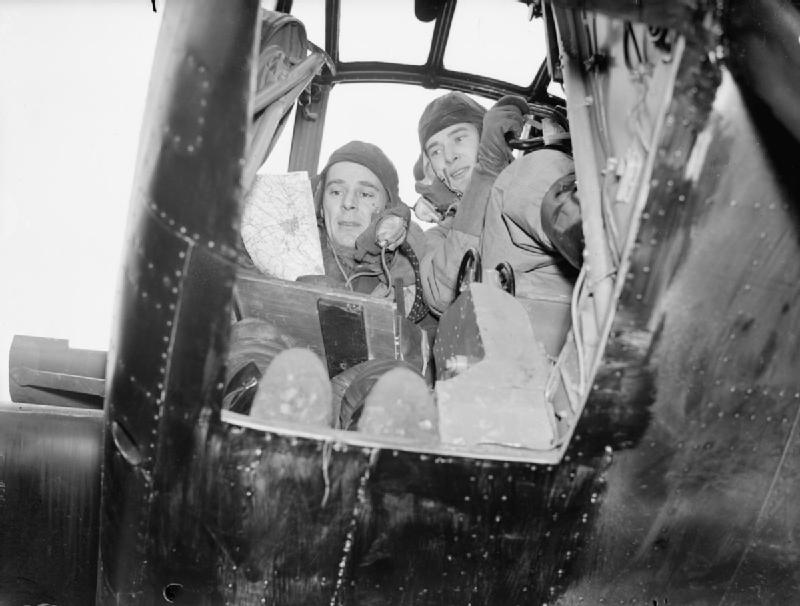
A pilot and observer with a Bigsworth chart board posing for a picture in a Bristol Blenheim, France, 1939–1940. C863

Bigsworth developed his Bigsworth Protractor, Parallels and Chart Board, commonly known as the Bigsworth chart board, around 1918, to aid in the use of charts for aerial navigation. It consisted of a wooden board upon which a navigational chart could be placed. The board was square and available in two sizes, 14 inches or 17 inches. A pivoted double parallel linking arm could be adjusted up and down the side of the board. Mounted on its other end was a protractor which could be positioned over any point on the chart and at any angle.

The Bigsworth chart board became "one of the most convenient available outfits ... for plotting and determining courses, finding position, etc." It "was produced in substantial quantities and it remained in service well into WWII when it was still providing a portable and self-contained navigation station in aeroplanes ... in which adequate facilities for the observer were still lacking."

The Bigsworth board was used by the British Royal Navy. It helped pioneer carrier-borne fighter control when adopted by Lieutenant Commander Charles Coke, Air Signals Officer on the aircraft carrier Ark Royal during the Norwegian Campaign. The ship was not fitted with radar, relying on reports from the accompanying radar-equipped cruisers, and Coke plotted the reported positions on a Bigsworth Board'.

The Board gets a mention in the Fleet Air Arm's Song Book's parody of Kipling's If:

If you can keep control of your dividers

And Bigsworth board and Gosport tube and pad;

Or listen to the wireless and pilot

Talking in unison – and not go mad.
