= Maurice Michael Stephens =

- Born: 20 October 1919; Ranchi, India
- Died: 23 September 2004 (aged 84)
- Military career
- Allegiance: United Kingdom
- Branch: Royal Air Force
- Service years: 1938–1960
- Rank: Group Captain
- Commands: No. 229 Squadron RAF; No. 232 Squadron RAF; No. 249 Squadron RAF
- Conflicts: Second World War: Battle of France; Battle of Britain; Channel Front; Siege of Malta
- Awards: Distinguished Service Order; Distinguished Flying Cross & Two Bars

Maurice Michael Stephens, DSO, DFC & Two Bars (20 October 1919 – 23 September 2004) was a Royal Air Force flying ace of the Second World War. Stephens scored 17 kills, three shared kills, one probable kills and five damaged.

== Early life ==
Born in Ranchi, India on 20 October 1919, the son of John William Stephens, a British Army officer serving with the Lincolnshire Regiment, Stephens was educated at the Xaverian Colleges at Clapham and Mayfield, Sussex. After school he initially joined the Port of London Authority, before going to the Royal Air Force College Cranwell in 1938. At Cranwell he excelled in boxing and rowing and was awarded his wings in 1940.

== Second World War ==
Stephens' first posting was to No. 3 Squadron RAF, with whom he fought during the Battle of France. He became the Flight Commander of B Flight during this battle, while still holding the rank of pilot officer. On his return from France he was awarded the Distinguished Flying Cross (DFC) and Bar, which were gazetted at the same time (and in fact on the same page of the London Gazette):

Distinguished Flying Cross

[...]
This officer has destroyed four enemy aircraft in May, 1940, and led his flight with courage and skill.

Bar to the Distinguished Flying Cross
[...]

This officer has continued to lead his flight against formations of enemy aircraft of much superior numbers with such good leadership that he rarely lost any members of his formation. In addition Pilot Officer Stephens brought down four more enemy aircraft recently, bringing his total to eight.

After the fall of France, B Flight was posted to Scotland and reformed as No. 232 Squadron RAF, of which Stephens was Commanding Officer. No 232 Squadron formed part of No. 13 Group RAF during the Battle of Britain. He was promoted flying officer on 20 August 1940, in the middle of the battle.

Stephens next served North Africa where he joined No. 274 Squadron and was sent to Turkey for eight months, during which he flew operational patrols along the Bulgarian border. He twice intercepted Italian S-84 reconnaissance aircraft intruding across the border, and shot two down in a Turkish Hurricane, while wearing civilian clothes. In November 1941 he returned to the Western Desert to command No. 80 Squadron. He was shot down and wounded in both feet in December 1941, receiving a Distinguished Service Order in January 1942. The citation read:

In December, 1941, this officer led a bombing and machine-gun attack on enemy mechanical transport in the Acroma area. Following the attack, Squadron Leader Stephens observed the fighter escort in combat with a force of enemy fighters, but, whilst attempting to participate in the engagement, his aircraft was severely damaged by an enemy fighter pilot whose cannon fire exploded the starboard petrol tank which, with the oil tank, burst into flames. The same burst of fire wounded Squadron Leader Stephens in both feet and blew out the starboard side of the aircraft's cockpit. Squadron Leader Stephens then prepared to abandon aircraft but, when half-way out of the cockpit, he observed an enemy aircraft fly past him. He immediately regained his seat and shot down the enemy aircraft. Squadron Leader Stephens finally, left his crippled aircraft by parachute and landed safely on the ground where he beat out the flames from his burning clothing. Although he had landed within 300 yards of the enemy's lines, Squadron Leader Stephens succeeded in regaining our own territory within three-quarters of an hour. Throughout, this officer displayed great courage and devotion to duty. Previously, Squadron Leader Stephens led his squadron on operations which were of the greatest value during the battle for Tobruk. His leadership and example proved an inspiration.

He then joined No. 229 Squadron flying Spitfires on Malta in October 1942. He was shot down on 12 October and picked up by an air-sea rescue motor launch. In November we became wing commander (flying) at Hal Far airfield. He returned to the UK in 1943 and served in various staff positions, before becoming Chief Flying Instructor at No. 3 Operational Training Unit in January 1944.

Stephens' final score in the war was 15 (and 3 shared) destroyed, 2 unconfirmed destroyed, 1 probable and 5 damaged.

== Post-war career and personal life ==
Stephens continued to serve in the RAF until 1960. After the Second World War he was the first RAF officer to join the newly formed NATO and had staff appointments with Supreme Headquarters Allied Powers Europe and in the Air Ministry, where he was involved in fighter operations.

He joined the Rolls-Royce company soon afterward and based himself in Paris. He retired altogether in 1980 and lived in the south of France, only to return to Britain in 1992.

In 1942 he married Violet May Paterson, always known as "Blue" because she was given a blue ribbon when she was born to identify her from her twin sister; the couple had a son and a daughter.

Photographs of Stephens' medals and damage to his aircraft appeared in the Daily Telegraph in June 2012.

== Bibliography ==
- Holmes, Tony. Hurricanes Aces 1939–1940. London: Osprey, 1998 ISBN 978-1-85532-597-5.
- Price, Dr. Alfred. Spitfire Mark V Aces 1939–1945. London: Osprey, 1997 ISBN 978-1-85532-635-4.
