= Kenton Bar =

Coordinates: 55.0063°N 1.6648°W

- Location within Tyne and Wear
- OS grid reference: NZ216681
  - London: 242 miles (389 km)
- Metropolitan borough: Newcastle upon Tyne
- Metropolitan county: Tyne and Wear
- Region: North East
- Country: England
- Sovereign state: United Kingdom
- Post town: NEWCASTLE UPON TYNE
- Postcode district: NE3
- Dialling code: 0191
- Police: Northumbria
- Fire: Tyne and Wear
- Ambulance: North East
- UK Parliament: Newcastle upon Tyne Central

Kenton Bar is a housing estate, that is part of Kenton Ward in Newcastle upon Tyne, England. It is situated immediately west of North Kenton and to the north of Cragston Park and Cowgate.

The estate was designed by the Ryder and Yates architectural practice. All buildings have a distinctive flat roof design. Many have white or cream walls, which in many cases owe their colour to crushed sea-shells attached to the rendering while it was still wet. Construction of the estate began shortly after 1966 and comprises terraced houses, bungalows, and flats.

The estate is roughly crescent-shaped and surrounds the western and northern sides of Kenton School's playing fields.

Hazeldene Avenue runs around the outer perimeter of the estate and, at both ends, provides the estate's only vehicular access and egress. Ryal Walk, Studdon Walk and Hartburn Walk are the main pedestrian thoroughfares, running along the inner side of the "crescent".

The estate was designed in such a way that almost every pair of dwellings on the estate, apart from the single terrace of town-houses on the southern side of Hazeldene Avenue near its junction with Kenton Lane, is linked by a pedestrian route, without the need to cross any road.

The Newcastle Western Bypass, part of the A1, runs along the north-western edge of the estate and is separated from Hazeldene Avenue by a fence and earth embankment.

== Facilities and amenities ==
The estate is home to Kenton Bar Primary School. There is also a small shopping centre which over the years has included an off licence, news agent, general store, hairdresser's salon and fish-and-chip shop.

In previous years there existed a doctor's surgery (destroyed by fire) adjacent to the shops, and in the late 1980s and early 1990s a community centre existed in a portable building next to the shops.

The estate has never had a public house. The nearest pub to the southern end of the estate was called The Kenton Bar, but was renamed to The Crofter's Lodge in the late 1980s and was demolished in 2011.

== History ==
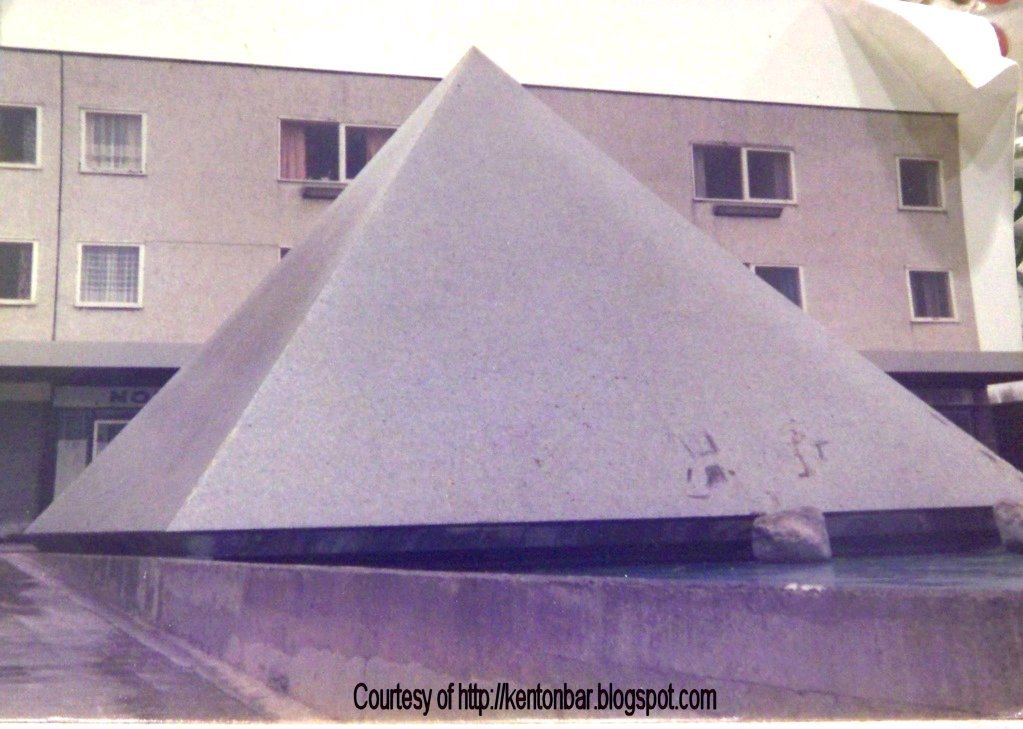
Kenton Bar Pyramid

The estate was constructed between 1966 and 1968. It had one famous landmark called the Kenton Bar Pyramid or, less formally, the "Pyrry", which was located in the estate's shopping centre at Mallowburn Crescent. The pyramid was about 7 metres tall, constructed of reinforced concrete, in classic Egyptian proportions, and faced with ceramic mosaic tiles. Next to the pyramid was a water channel. The water feature was designed to pump water from underneath the pyramid and along the channel, to a waterfall.

The council had intended to build a second parade of shops underneath the Reestones Place flats, the two sets of shops being linked by a ramp and a flight of steps either side of the pyramid. The Reestones Place shops were never built, as a result of which the block of flats has no ground floor (other than access stairwells) and is supported only by pillars and load-bearing walls.

The Pyramid's water feature was prone to blockages, causing failure of the pumping mechanism. By the early 1970s the local authority had ceased repairing it. Local children and teenagers quickly discovered that they could climb the pyramid by rubbing tar onto the soles of their shoes. Tar was readily available because the council, as the main (and initially the only) landlord, had a rolling programme of repairing the estate's flat roofs.

In the early 1990s, the Pyramid, together with the ramp and the adjacent concreted areas and walls opposite the shops and the Reestones Place flats, were demolished, and replaced by a gently-sloping landscaped area.

The estate was provided with a garage for every property, including flats and bungalows. From 1991 onward, a number of garages were demolished, because many garages, located up to 200 metres from the flats or houses to which they were linked, had become derelict and vandalised. These circumstances arose because many residents did not own cars and therefore had no need of a garage. As a consequence, the council demolished a number of contiguous blocks of garages and landscaped these areas, reallocating the remaining garages only to tenants who expressed an intention to use them.

== Streets and walks ==
Kenton Bar Estate has 18 street names in total, as follows:

Hazeldene Avenue; Fawlee Green; Ryal Walk; Apperley Avenue; Beal Green; Byrness Close; Mallowburn Crescent; Studdon Walk; Hartburn Walk; Reestones Place; Hazeley Grove; Hazeley Way; Thirston Way; Laverock Place; Fourstones Close; Dunnykirk Avenue; Eland Close; Gunnerston Grove.

Studdon Walk was originally named Broomlee Walk but was renamed because of confusion with an existing street, Broomley Walk, in the nearby district of Gosforth.

== See also ==
- RAF Blakelaw - its operations room was at Kenton Bar
