= Richard Saul =

Royal Air Force Air Vice-Marshal (1891-1965)

Richard Ernest Saul
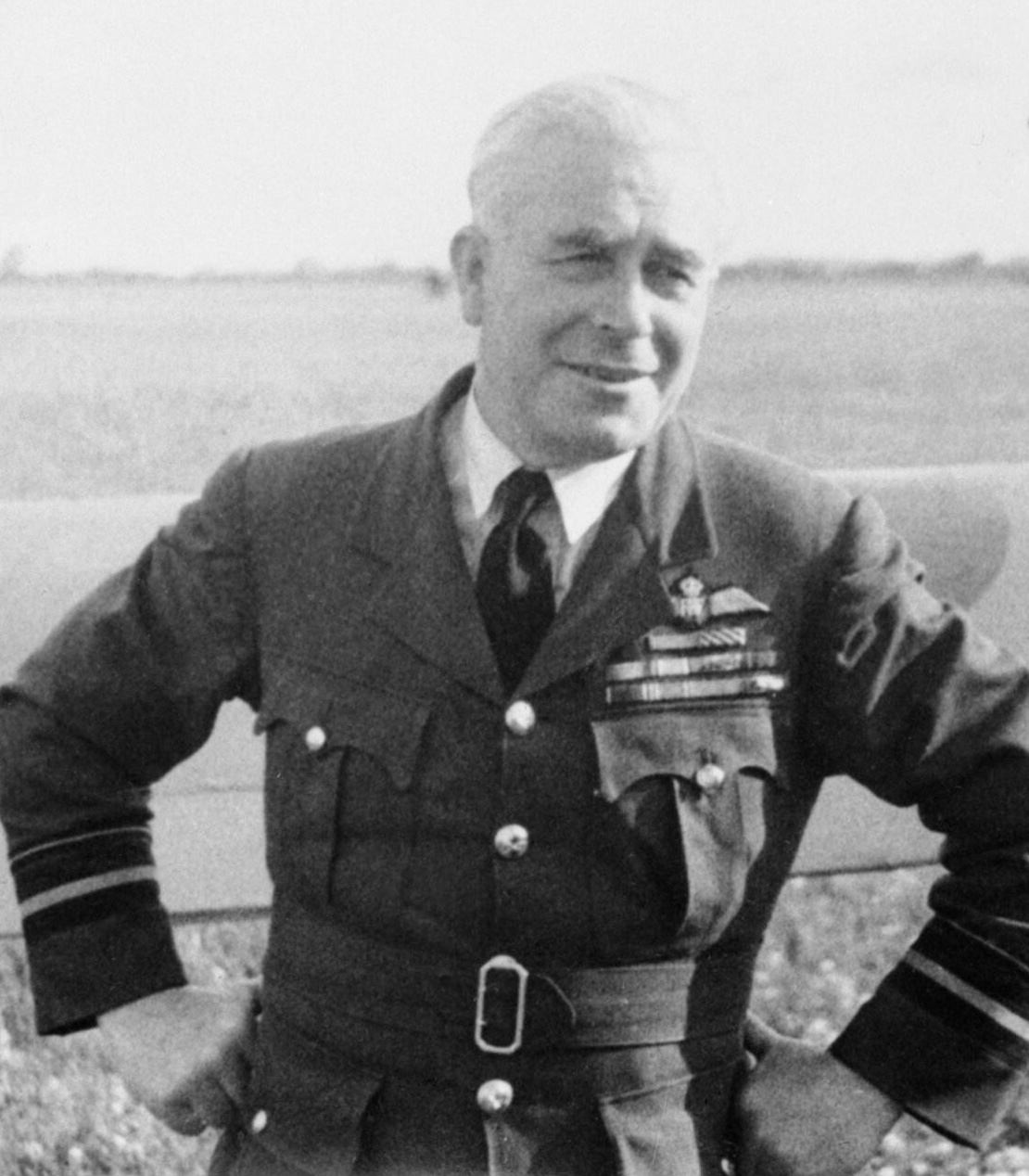
- Air Vice Marshal Richard Saul c. 1940
- Born: 16 April 1891; Dublin, Ireland
- Died: 30 November 1965 (aged 74)
- Military career
- Allegiance: United Kingdom
- Branch: British Army (1914–1918); Royal Air Force (1918–1944)
- Service years: 1914–1944
- Rank: Air Vice-Marshal
- Commands: Air Defences Eastern Mediterranean (1943–1944); No. 12 Group (1940–1942); No. 13 Group (1939–1940); RAF Calshot (1936–1937); No. 203 Squadron (1933–1936); School of Army Co-operation (1930–1933); No. 2 Squadron (1925–1927); No. 12 Squadron (1919–1921); No. 7 Squadron (1919); No. 4 Squadron (1917–1919)
- Conflicts: First World War; Second World War * Battle of Britain
- Awards: Companion of the Order of the Bath; Distinguished Flying Cross; Mentioned in Despatches; Knight of the Order of the Crown (Belgium); Croix de guerre (Belgium)
- Other work: United Nations official

Air Vice-Marshal Richard Ernest Saul, CB, DFC (16 April 1891 – 30 November 1965) was a pilot during the First World War and a senior Royal Air Force commander during the Second World War.

== Earlier years ==
Saul was born in Dublin, Ireland, in 1891. He was a bank official with the Royal Bank of Ireland before joining the Army. At the start of the First World War he was a second lieutenant in the Royal Army Service Corps but by 1916 he was a Flying Officer (Observer) with No. 16 Squadron of the Royal Flying Corps. During the war he rose to command No. 4 Squadron and after the armistice he commanded No. 7 Squadron and then No. 12 Squadron. In 1925 he was given command of No. 2 Squadron. A keen sportsman Saul played rugby and hockey for the RAF; in both 1928 and 1932 he was the RAF tennis champion. In September 1933 Saul was appointed the Officer Commanding No. 203 Squadron operating from Basra in Iraq and in 1935 Saul led a flight of flying boats, from his squadron, on a long-distance journey from Plymouth to Basra.

== Second World War and beyond ==
During the Second World War Saul was Air Officer Commanding No. 13 Group from 1939, Air Officer Commanding No. 12 Group from 1940 and then Air Officer Commanding Air Defences Eastern Mediterranean from 1943.

Saul retired from the RAF on 29 June 1944 and then served as the Chairman of the United Nations Relief and Rehabilitation Administration's mission in the Balkans. He next acted as the vice-chairman of the International Transport Commission in Rome. After Saul left Rome in 1951, he took up employment as the manager of the University of Toronto bookshop until finally retiring in 1959. Richard Saul died on 30 November 1965 after being hit by a car two days earlier.

== Notes ==
Military offices
Preceded by L. Jenkins	Officer Commanding No. 4 Squadron; 1917–1919	Succeeded by H. B. Prior
Preceded by L. F. Forbes	Officer Commanding No. 2 Squadron; 1925–1927	Succeeded by W. Sowrey
Preceded by William Welsh	Officer Commanding No. 203 Squadron; 1933–1936	Succeeded by William Callaway
Preceded by Edward Rice	Officer Commanding RAF Calshot; 1936–1937	Succeeded by Arthur Coningham
New title	Air Officer Commanding No. 13 (Fighter) Group; 1939–1940	Succeeded by John Andrews
Preceded by Trafford Leigh-Mallory	Air Officer Commanding No. 12 (Fighter) Group; 1940–1942	Succeeded by John Andrews
Preceded by Wilfred McClaughry	Air Officer Commanding Air Headquarters Egypt; Became AOC Air Defences Eastern Mediterranean on 4 March 1943; 1943–1944	Succeeded by Thomas Langford-Sainsbury; As AOC Air Headquarters Eastern Mediterranean
