= No. 13 Group RAF =

Former Royal Air Force group in Northern Britain

- No. 13 Group badge
- Active: 1 April 1918–18 October 1919; 15 March 1939–20 May 1946; 4 April 1955–31 December 1961
- Country: United Kingdom
- Branch: Royal Air Force
- Type: Royal Air Force group
- Role: Fighter cover for Scotland, Northern Ireland and Northern England
- Part of: RAF Fighter Command
- Garrison/HQ: Newcastle, England (1939–1943); Inverness, Scotland (1943–1945); Dalcross, Scotland (1945–1946)
- Mottos: Non crambem/Da vrambon sed carnem (Latin for 'Not cabbage but meat')
- Royal Air Force Ensign
- Engagements: World War II: European theatre of World War II; Battle of Britain

Commanders
- Notable commanders: Air Vice-Marshal Richard Ernest Saul CB, DFC

No. 13 Group RAF (13 Gp) was a group in the Royal Air Force for various periods in the 20th century. It is most famous for having the responsibility for defending the North of the United Kingdom during the Battle of Britain.

== First World War ==
No. 13 Group RAF was first formed on 1 April 1918 within No. 3 Area. It was quickly transferred to Midland Area on 8 May of that year. On 18 October 1919 the Group's first existence came to an end when it was disbanded by amalgamating it with No. 3 Group.

== Second World War ==
=== Preparations for War ===
As Fighter Command expanded prior to the Second World War, it was seen that a new Group was needed to command the air defences of Scotland, Northern Ireland, and the north of England. 13 Group was duly reformed in September 1939. During the initial stages of World War II, No. 13 Group was Commanded by Air Vice Marshal Richard Saul.

=== The Dowding System in 13 Group ===
Like the other groups into which fighter command were divided, No. 13 Group operated the Dowding system of fighter control. The 13 Group HQ was at Kenton, near Newcastle upon Tyne with the Filter Room at nearby Blakelaw Quarry. The sector airfields were:

- RAF Acklington
- RAF Dyce
- RAF Inverness
- RAF Turnhouse
- RAF Usworth
- RAF Wick

=== Stations ===
Besides the sector airfields, between 1940 and 1944, No. 13 Group used the following assets in its operations. The letter A after a station name denotes an airfield, and a R denotes a radar site that fed information into the group headquarters.

- RAF Acklington A
- RAF Aldergrove A
- RAF Anstruther R
- RAF Ayr A
- RAF Bamburgh R
- RAF Blakelaw HQ
- RAF Castletown A
- RAF Catterick A
- RAF Church Fenton A
- RAF Cockburnspath R
- RAF Cresswell R
- RAF Dalcross HQ
- RAF Danby Beacon R
- RAF Doonies Hill R
- RAF Douglas Wood
- RAF Drem A
- RAF Drone Hill R
- RAF Dyce A
- RAF Fair Isle R
- RAF Grangemouth A
- RAF Hillhead R
- RAF Inverness HQ
- RAF Leconfield A
- RAF Leeming A
- RAF Netherbutton R
- RAF Ottercops Moss R
- RAF Ouston A
- RAF Prestwick A
- RAF Rosehearty R
- RAF St Cyrus R
- RAF Schoolhill R
- RAF Shotton R
- RAF Skeabrae A
- RAF Sumburgh A
- RAF Thrumster R
- RAF Turnhouse A
- RAF Usworth A
- RAF Wick A

=== Battle of Britain ===
As well as guarding the north during the Battle of Britain, No. 13 Group also provided reserve squadrons and pilots to the more beleaguered No. 11 Group, and provided quieter bases for squadrons to recuperate from operations.

No. 13 Group also contributed to pilot education by producing its "Forget-Me-Nots for Fighters" brochure, that included a foreword by Air Vice-Marshal R. E. Saul.

During the Battle of Britain, the Germans had faulty intelligence indicating that No. 13 Group had next to no fighters in operation (they believed that the only reason why No. 11 Group was still holding out was that No. 13 Group had been sending them down their available aircraft), so they had thought that any attacks made on Scotland would not face any serious resistance. This proved to be a costly mistake for the Luftwaffe, as their bombers were intercepted by a large number of fighters. The bombers could not be escorted all the way to Scotland from Occupied Europe because of the short range of the Messerschmitt Bf 109 fighter aircraft, so the attacking bombers proved to be fodder for Saul's Supermarine Spitfire and Hawker Hurricane fighter squadrons. On 15 August 1940 the Luftwaffe attempted its one and only daylight flank attack on Northern England. North East England was attacked by 65 Heinkel He 111 bombers, escorted by 34 Messerschmitt Bf 110 heavy fighters, and RAF Driffield was attacked by 50 unescorted Junkers Ju 88 multirole combat aircraft. Out of the 115 bombers and 35 fighters the Luftwaffe sent, 16 bombers and 7 fighters were destroyed.

=== Post Battle of Britain ===
After the Battle of Britain, 13 Group squadrons helped RAF Coastal Command in patrolling for U-boats and providing air cover for convoys. New pilots would usually find themselves posted to a 13 Group squadron initially so as to gain experience with lesser risk of getting shot down.

In June 1943, No. 32 Wing of RAF Army Cooperation Command was transferred to 13 Group, and so brought with it three further airfields to operate from; Macmerry, Kirknewton and Findo Gask. In July 1943, No. 14 Group was disbanded, and its assets and the area it covered, were absorbed into No. 13 Group. In August of the same year, the headquarters element was moved from Newcastle in England, to Inverness in Scotland.

== Post war ==
In November 1945, the headquarters moved again to RAF Dalcross in Scotland. At that time the group had responsibility for five squadrons at two stations; No.s 91, 122 and 316 at RAF Wick, and No.s 164 and 303 at RAF Turnhouse. No. 13 Group was disbanded on 20 May 1946. However, nine years later, on 4 April 1955, it was reformed at RAF Watnall, again in a fighter role. It finally disbanded on 31 December 1961 when it was redesignated No. 11 Group.

== Commanders ==
The following officers had command of No. 13 Group:

=== 1918 to 1919 ===
- 1 April 1918 Unknown

=== 1939 to 1946 ===
- 24 July 1939 Air Vice-Marshal Richard Ernest Saul
- 4 February 1941 Air Vice-Marshal John Oliver Andrews
- 27 November 1942 Air Vice-Marshal Malcolm Henderson
- 15 November 1943 Air Vice-Marshal Stanley Flamank Vincent
- 26 January 1944 Air Commodore John Auguste Boret
- 3 May 1945 1945 Air Commodore T B Prickman

=== 1955 to 1961 ===
- 16 May 1955 Air Vice-Marshal Walter Graemes Cheshire
- 1 July 1957 Air Vice-Marshal Alfred Earle
- 9 November 1959 Air Vice-Marshal Harold John Maguire

== See also ==
- RAF Fighter Command
- Battle of Britain
- List of Battle of Britain airfields
- List of Battle of Britain squadrons
