= No. 12 Group RAF =

Former Royal Air Force operations group

- No. 12 Group badge
- Active: 1 April 1918 - 1 November 1919; 1 April 1937 - 1 April 1963
- Country: United Kingdom
- Branch: Royal Air Force
- Type: Royal Air Force group
- Role: Fighter cover for the Midlands and East Anglia
- Part of: RAF Fighter Command
- Garrison/HQ: RAF Watnall, Nottinghamshire, England
- Motto: We fight to defend
- Royal Air Force Ensign
- Engagements: World War II: European theatre of World War II; Battle of Britain

Commanders
- Notable commanders: Air Chief Marshal Sir Trafford Leigh-Mallory KCB, DSO & Bar

No. 12 Group RAF (12 Gp) of the Royal Air Force was a group, a military formation, that existed over two separate periods, namely the end of the First World War when it had a training function and from just prior to the Second World War until the early 1960s when it was tasked with an air defence role.

== History ==
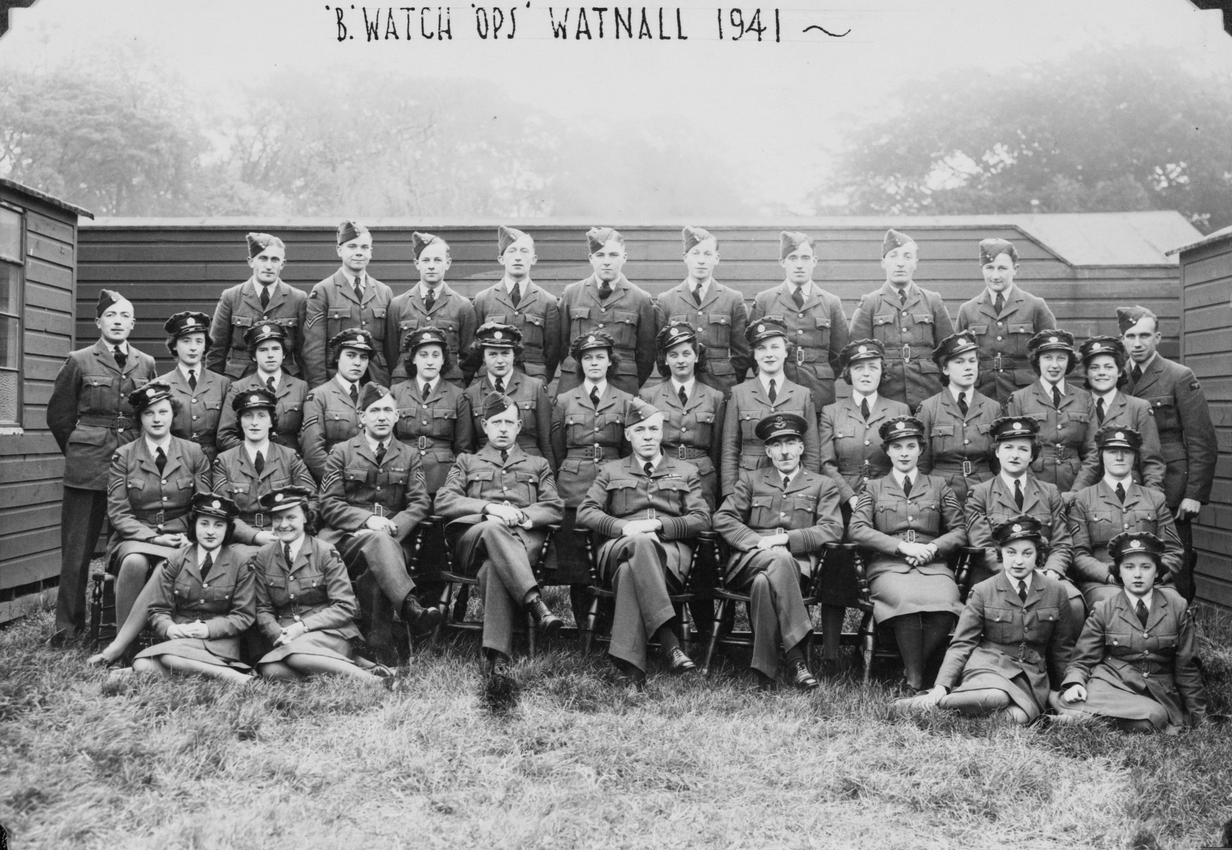
RAF and WAAF servicemen and women of B Watch (Operations) at RAF Watnall

=== First World War ===
No. 12 Group was first formed on 1 April 1918 at RAF Cranwell, Lincolnshire, within No. 3 Area. It succeeded the Royal Navy's Central Depot and Training Establishment which had been training naval aviators at Cranwell since 1916. The first RAF General Officer Commanding was Brigadier-General Harold Briggs who received the appointment on promotion from Captain in the Royal Navy. On 8 May 1918 the group transferred to Midland Area, and then to Northern Area on 18 October 1919. On 1 November that year the Group ceased to exist when it became the RAF (Cadet) College.

=== Second World War ===
The group was reformed on 1 April 1937 in Fighter Command at RAF Uxbridge as No. 12 (Fighter) Group. It was the group responsible for aerial defence of the Midlands, Norfolk, Lincolnshire and North Wales. Construction of a purpose built site at RAF Watnall, a non-flying station in Nottinghamshire, was not completed until late 1940, after which operations were relocated from nearby RAF Hucknall. During the Second World War this group was the second most important group of Fighter Command, and as such, it received its share of attacks from the German Luftwaffe throughout the war.

The commander of 12 Group during the Battle of Britain was Air Vice Marshal Trafford Leigh-Mallory, who was a rather ambitious man. Despite his length of service in the RAF, he was passed over for being named the Air Officer Commanding of the more vital 11 Group in favour of Air Vice Marshal Keith Park. Leigh-Mallory felt himself slighted over this and his relations with Park were poisoned thereafter.

As well as regional defence, 12 Group were also supposed to provide fighter cover for 11 Group airfields during the Battle of Britain, but several times, these fields were left undefended. When Park complained about it, Leigh-Mallory responded that in order to test his Big Wing theory (espoused by Squadron Leader Douglas Bader), more time was needed to get the necessary squadrons airborne.

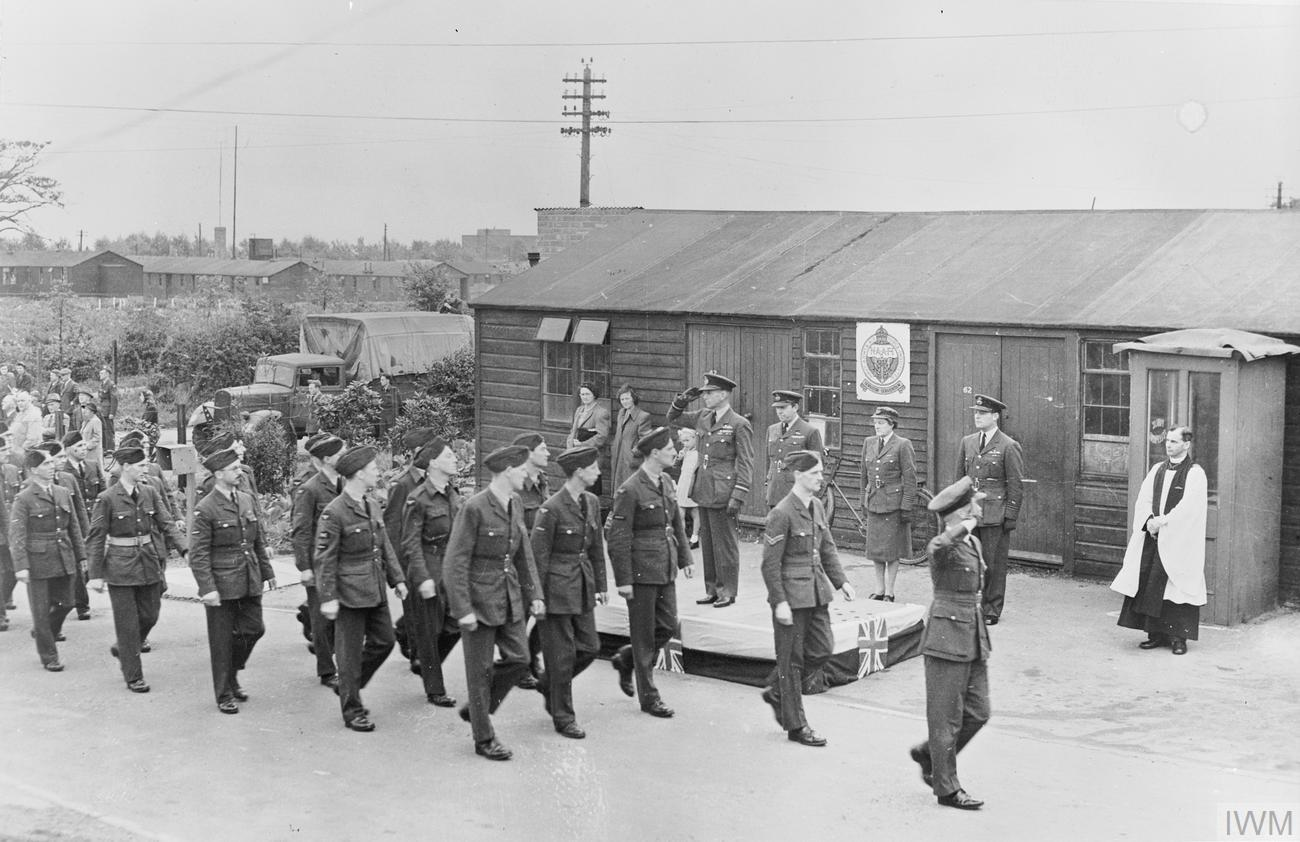
Vj Day Parade and Service at RAF Watnall

The Big Wings met with mixed success, enough for the Air Ministry to use it as an excuse to remove Park and Air Chief Marshal Hugh Dowding from their commands on the grounds that they had mismanaged the Battle of Britain.

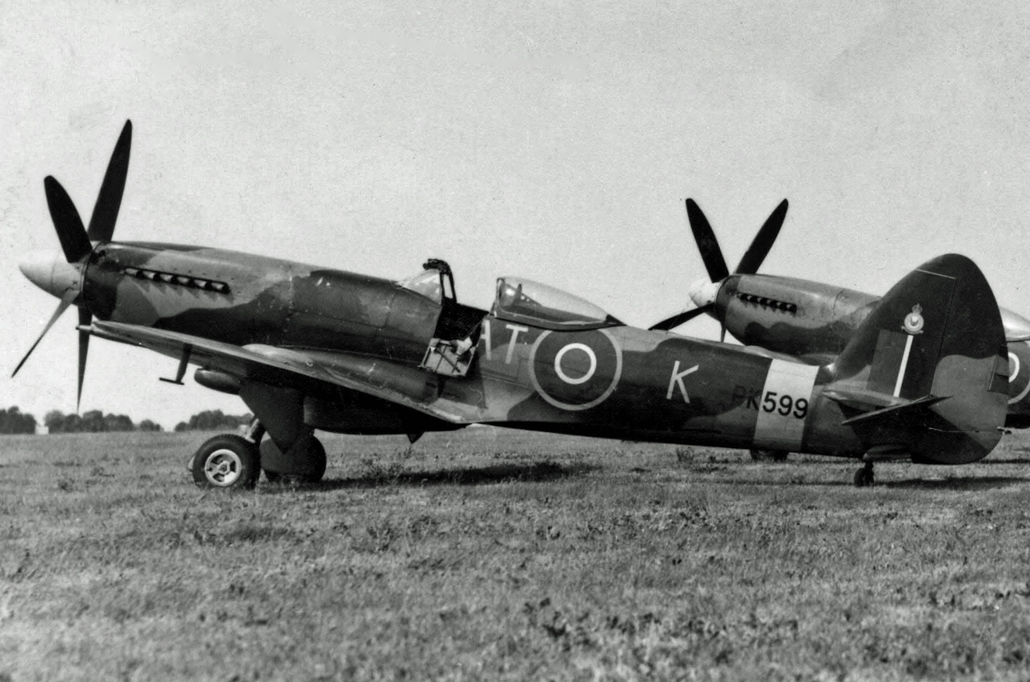
A Supermarine Spitfire F.22 of No. 613 (City of Manchester) Squadron RAuxAF, at RAF Ringway in May 1949.

After Park was ousted, Leigh-Mallory took over 11 Group. 12 Group still continued its assignment of defending the Midlands and supporting both 10 Group and 11 Group.

=== Post war ===
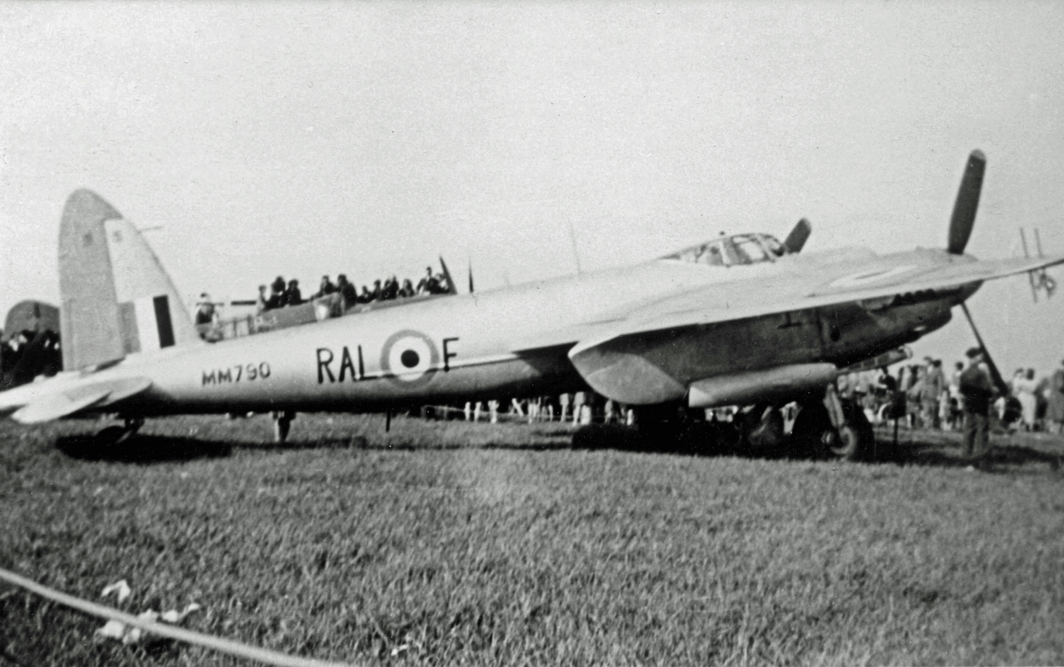
de Havilland Mosquito NF.30 MM790 of 605 (County of Warwick) Squadron RAuxAF at RAF Ringway

Group Headquarters moved to RAF Newton on 20 December 1946 and the operations block at Watnall was closed on 12 December 1946.

Order of Battle: 3 June 1950
Airfield	Squadron(s)	Aircraft type
RAF Church Fenton Yorkshire	No. 19	Gloster Meteor F.4
RAF Church Fenton Yorkshire	23 and 141	de Havilland Mosquito NF.36
RAF Church Fenton Yorkshire	41	de Havilland Hornet F.3
RAF Horsham St Faith, Norfolk	74, 245, 257 and 263 (forming the Horsham Wing)	Gloster Meteor F.4
RAF Linton-on-Ouse Lincolnshire	66 and 92	Gloster Meteor F.4
RAF Linton-on-Ouse Lincolnshire	64 and 65	de Havilland Hornet F.3
RAF Hooton Park	610 RAuxAF	Supermarine Spitfire F.22
RAF Hooton Park	611 RAuxAF	Gloster Meteor F.4
RAF Acklington	264	de Havilland Mosquito NF.36
RAF Leuchars Fife	222	Gloster Meteor F.4
RAF Wymeswold Leicestershire	504 RAuxAF	Gloster Meteor F.4
RAF Aldergrove	502 RAuxAF	Supermarine Spitfire F.22
RAF Abbotsinch	602 RAuxAF	Supermarine Spitfire F.22
RAF Turnhouse	603 RAuxAF	Supermarine Spitfire F.22
RAF Honiley	605 RAuxAF	de Havilland Vampire FB.5
RAF Ouston	607 RAuxAF	Supermarine Spitfire F.22
RAF Yeadon West Riding of Yorkshire	609 RAuxAF	Supermarine Spitfire LF.16
RAF Dyce Aberdeenshire	612 RAuxAF	Supermarine Spitfire LF.16e
RAF Middleton St George	608 RAuxAF	Supermarine Spitfire F.22
RAF Finningley Nottinghamshire/West Riding of Yorkshire	616 RAuxAF	Gloster Meteor F.4
RAF Ringway Cheshire	613 RAuxAF	Supermarine Spitfire F.22

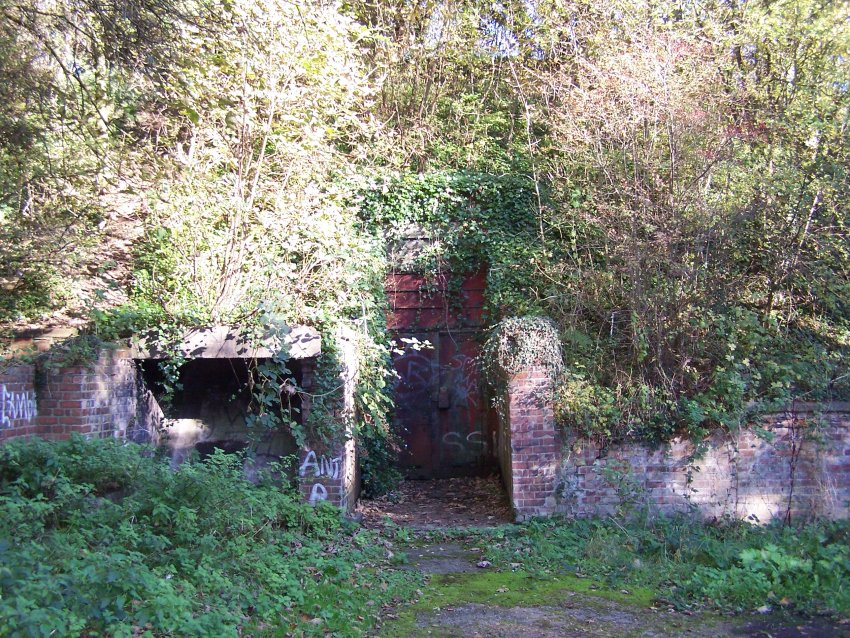
RAF Watnall bunker entrance in 2007

Group HQ then moved again on 14 August 1959 to RAF Horsham St Faith.

Order of Battle: April 1962

- RAF Horsham St. Faith (HQ)
  - No. 12 Group Communication Flight RAF - Avro Anson & Meteor
- RAF Coltishall
  - No. 23 Squadron RAF - Gloster Javelin
  - No. 74 Squadron RAF - English Electric Lightning
  - Air Fighting Development Squadron RAF - Lightning
- RAF Woolfox Lodge
  - No. 62 Squadron RAF - Bristol Bloodhound SAM
- RAF Warboys
  - No. 257 Squadron RAF - Bloodhound SAM
- RAF Old Sarum
  - School of Land/Air Warfare - Anson, Vampire & de Havilland Canada DHC-1 Chipmunk
- RAF Wattisham
  - No. 41 Squadron RAF - Javelin
  - No. 56 Squadron RAF - Lightning
  - No. 111 Squadron RAF - Lightning
- RAF Watton
  - No. 263 Squadron RAF - Bloodhound SAM
- RAF Marham
  - No. 242 Squadron RAF - Bloodhound SAM
- RAF Rattlesden
  - No. 266 Squadron RAF - Bloodhound SAM
- RAF West Raynham
  - No. 85 Squadron RAF - Javelin
  - Central Fighter Establishment - Hawker Hunter & Javelin

It was disbanded on 1 April 1963 and replaced by No. 12 (East Anglian) Sector, it moved to RAF Neatishead, Norfolk on 29 May 1963. On 1 April 1968, 12 Group passed into history when No. 12 Sector became Sector North within No. 11 Group RAF.

== Commanders ==
The following were air officer commanding No. 12 Group:

=== 1918 to 1919 ===
- 1 April 1918 Brigadier-General Harold Briggs
- 1 May 1919 Brigadier-General Francis Scarlett

=== 1937 to 1963 ===
- 1 April 1937 Air Vice-Marshal John Tyssen
- 4 December 1937 Air Vice-Marshal Trafford Leigh-Mallory
- 17 December 1940 Air Vice-Marshal Richard Saul
- 29 November 1942 Air Vice-Marshal John Oliver Andrews
- 1 June 1943 Air Vice-Marshal Roderic Hill
- 22 November 1943 Air Vice-Marshal Malcolm Henderson
- 1 January 1945 Air Vice-Marshal John Baker
- 5 May 1946 Air Vice-Marshal Thomas Traill
- 17 November 1948 Air Vice-Marshal G Harcourt-Smith
- 1 June 1951 Air Vice-Marshal Richard Atcherley
- 13 November 1953 Air Vice-Marshal W J Crisham
- 25 June 1956 Air Vice-Marshal H P Fraser
- 1 August 1958 Air Commodore C H Hartley (Chief of Staff as acting AOC)
- 1 January 1959 Air Vice-Marshal J R A Embling
- 20 July 1959 Air Vice-Marshal Christopher Hartley
- 1 June 1961 Air Vice-Marshal Robert Bateson

== See also ==
- List of Battle of Britain airfields
- List of Battle of Britain squadrons
