= No. 10 Group RAF =

Former Royal Air Force operations group

- No. 10 Group badge
- Active: 1 April 1918 – 18 January 1932; 1 June 1940 – 2 May 1945
- Country: United Kingdom
- Branch: Royal Air Force
- Type: Royal Air Force group
- Role: Fighter cover for South western England and Southern Wales
- Part of: RAF Fighter Command
- Garrison/HQ: RAF Box, Wiltshire, England
- Motto: Challenge
- Royal Air Force Ensign
- Engagements: World War II: European theatre of World War II; Battle of Britain

Commanders
- Notable commanders: Air Vice-Marshal Sir Christopher Joseph Quintin Brand KBE, DSO, MC, DFC

No. 10 Group RAF (10 Gp) was a former operations group of the Royal Air Force which participated in the Second World War.

== History ==
It was formed on 1 April 1918 in No. 2 Area. On 8 May of the next year it was transferred to South-Western Area. In 1919 it was transferred to Coastal Area where it remained until it was disbanded on 18 January 1932.

The group was re-formed on 1 June 1940 within Fighter Command to enable neighbouring No. 11 Group to function more efficiently. Its area of operation was the south-western region of England. Commanded by Air Vice Marshal Sir Quintin Brand, 10 Group supported 11 Group in the Battle of Britain by rotating squadrons, providing additional fighter support when needed, and supplying additional pilots. The Air Officer Commanding (AOC) of 11 Group, Air Vice Marshal Keith Park, had a far warmer relationship with Brand than with the AOC of 12 Group, Air Vice Marshal Trafford Leigh-Mallory, who regarded Park with jealousy.

As well as providing support for 11 Group, 10 Group also had some squadrons of aircraft that could not be risked in the Battle of Britain (Gloster Gladiator, Boulton Paul Defiant).

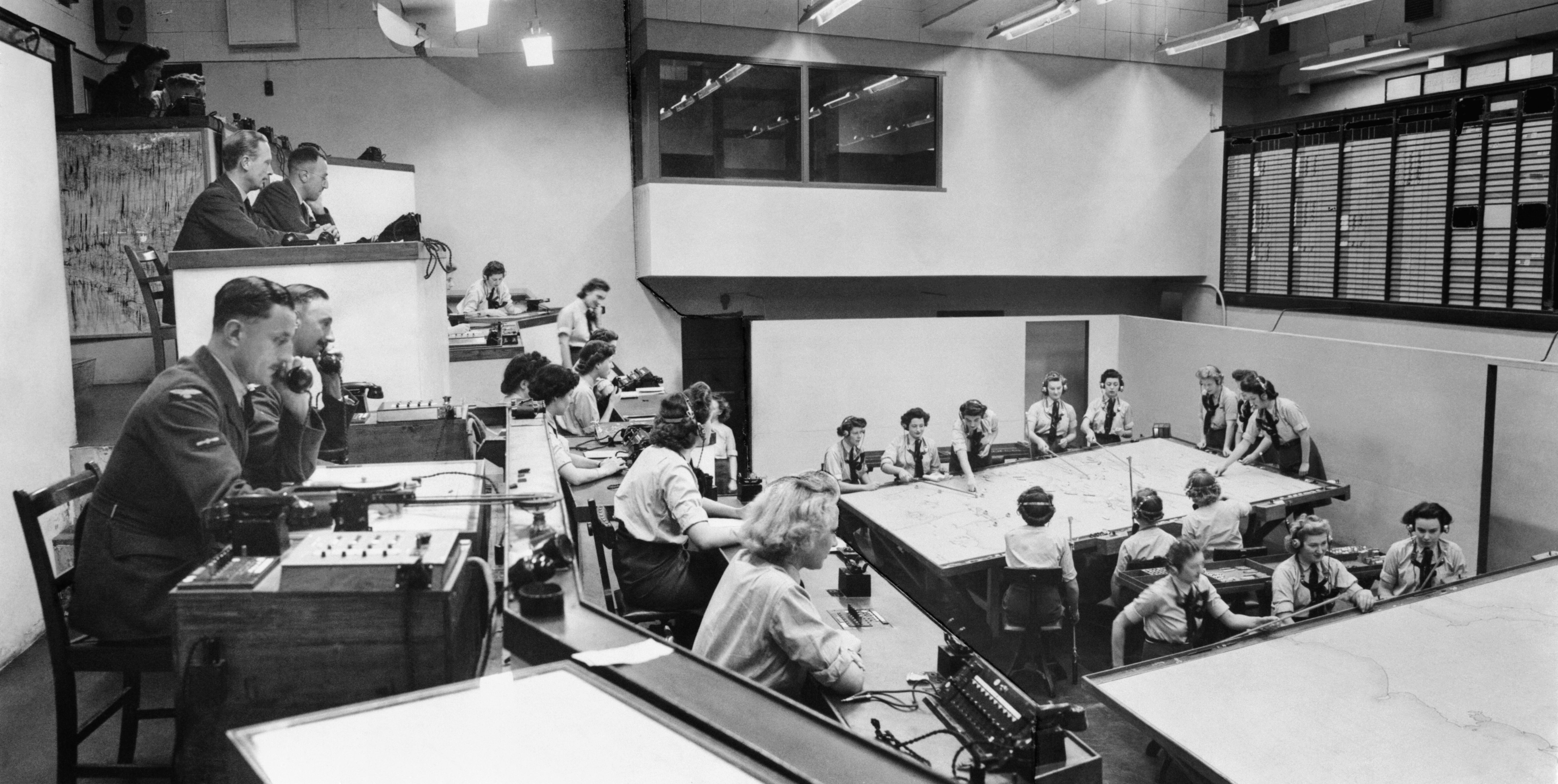
The Middle Wallop operations room in use in 1943

Brown's Quarry, a small quarry north of Tunnel Quarry, was converted into an underground operations centre for HQ No. 10 Group, RAF Box.

After the Battle of Britain, 10 Group also provided fighter cover missions for convoys approaching and leaving the British Isles. Pilots rotated into 10 Group from either 12 or 13 Group knew that soon they would go over to 11 Group, so the pilots took advantage of their comparatively safer area of operation to hone their skills.

No. 10 Group was reabsorbed into No. 11 Group on 2 May 1945.

== Order of Battle 1 August 1940 ==
On 1 August 1940 when air attacks began on the UK, the group was organised into several sectors:

- Group Headquarters at RAF Rudloe Manor
- No. 152 (Hyderabad) Squadron RAF at RAF Warmwell equipped with Supermarine Spitfire
- No. 247 (China-British) Squadron RAF at RNAS Roborough equipped with Gloster Gladiator
- No. 5 Operational Training Unit RAF at RAF Aston Down equipped with Supermarine Spitfire and Bristol Blenheim
- No. 6 Operational Training Unit RAF at RAF Sutton Bridge equipped with Hawker Hurricane
- No. 7 Operational Training Unit RAF at RAF Hawarden equipped with Hawker Hurricane and Supermarine Spitfire
- Middle Wallop Sector
  - Sector Headquarters at RAF Middle Wallop
  - No. 234 (Madras Presidency) Squadron RAF armed with Supermarine Spitfire
  - No. 604 (County of Middlesex) Squadron RAF armed with Bristol Blenheim
  - No. 609 (West Riding) Squadron RAF armed with Supermarine Spitfire
- Filton Sector
  - Sector Headquarters at RAF Filton
  - Care and Maintenance Party at RAF Filton
- Exeter Sector
  - Sector Headquarters at RAF Exeter
  - No. 87 (United Provinces) Squadron RAF armed with Hawker Hurricane
  - No. 213 (Ceylon) Squadron RAF armed with Hawker Hurricane
- Pembrey Sector
  - Sector Headquarters at RAF Pembrey
  - No. 92 (East India) Squadron RAF armed with Supermarine Spitfire
  - No. 238 Squadron RAF armed with Hawker Hurricane

In addition to this list, RAF Colerne was a sector station, by late 1940 - early 1941 with Boulton Paul Defiants and Bristol Beaufighters. Among its squadrons were No. 87 Squadron RAF with Hurricanes; No. 151 Squadron RAF; and No. 600 Squadron RAuxAF (under George Stainforth, one of the pre-war Schneider Trophy team). No. 87 Squadron operated from the satellite station at RAF Charmy Down, on the other side of Bath. Night-fighting was a priority. Also at Colerne was a Turbinlite flight with searchlight-equipped Bostons paired with single-engined fighters.

== Commanders ==
The following officers have been in command of 10 Group:

=== 1918 to 1932 ===
- 1 April 1918 Lieutenant Colonel (later Colonel) A W Bigsworth
- 1 August 1919 Group Captain H P Smyth Osbourne
- 27 July 1921 Group Captain J L Forbes
- 1 December 1924 Air Commodore E A D Masterman
- 6 April 1928 Air Commodore T C R Higgins
- 1 November 1929 Air Commodore A W Bigsworth
- 1 October 1931 Wing Commander L C Kemble (possibly a temporary appointment)
- 1 November 1931 Group Captain (later Air Commodore) N J Gill

=== 1940 to 1945 ===
- 15 June 1940 Air Vice-Marshal Sir Quintin Brand
- 22 July 1941 Air Vice-Marshal A H Orlebar
- 4 November 1942 Air Vice-Marshal W F Dickson
- 5 May 1943 Air Vice-Marshal C R Steele
- 3 June 1944 Air Commodore A V Harvey
- 10 July 1944 Air Vice-Marshal J B Cole-Hamilton
- Nov 1944 Unknown

== See also ==
- List of Royal Air Force groups
- RAF Fighter Command
- Battle of Britain
- List of Battle of Britain airfields
- List of Battle of Britain squadrons
