= Filter Room =

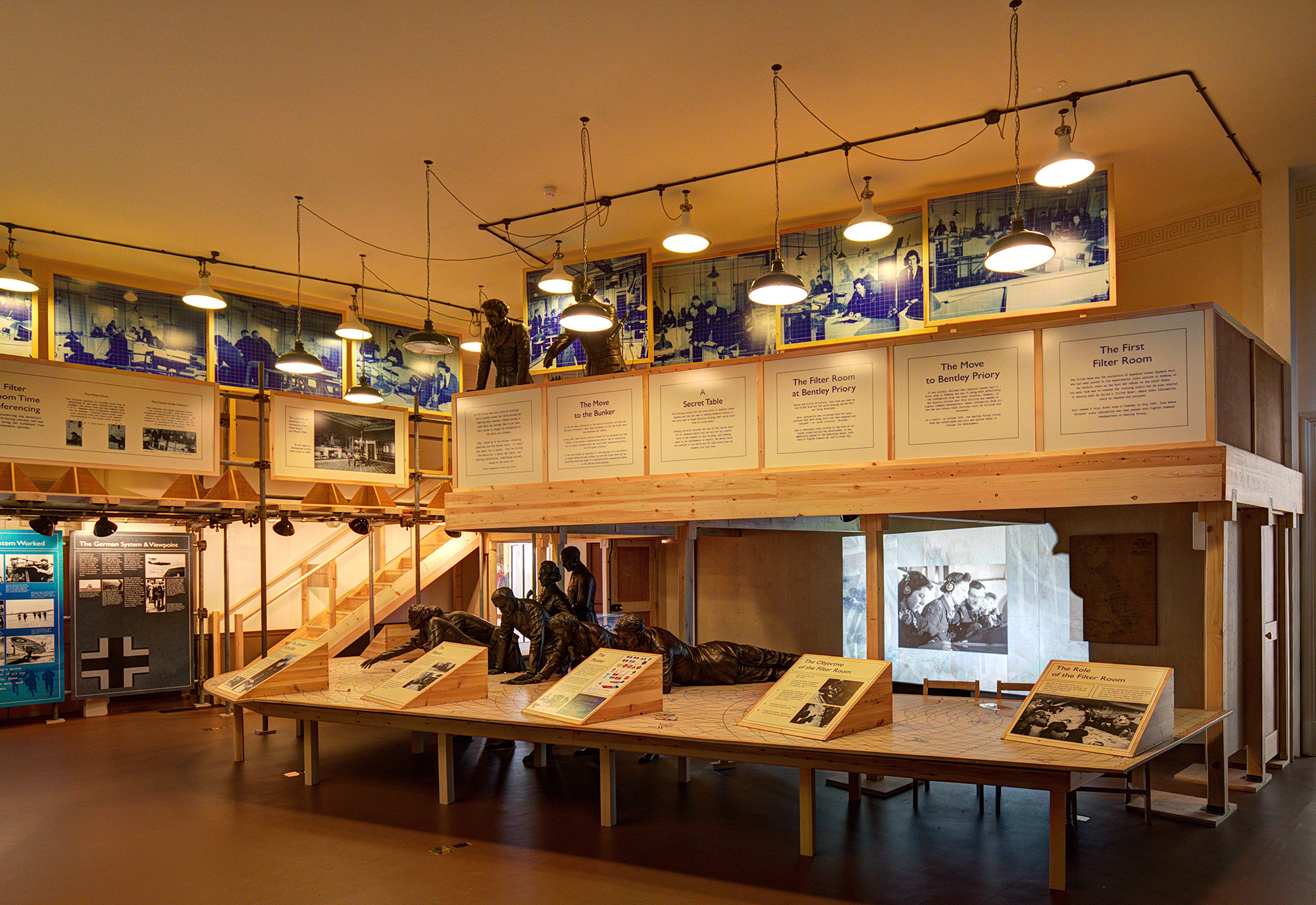
Filter room at RAF Fighter Command, Bentley Priory

A Filter Room was part of RAF Fighter Command's radar defence system in Britain during the Second World War. The filter room at Fighter Command Headquarters lay at the top of the Dowding system - the integrated ground-controlled interception network that covered the United Kingdom. The operations were considered secret and, as such, were covered by the Official Secrets Act.

== Operation ==
When the radar defence of Great Britain was set up, Robert Watson-Watt and his team created a chain of radar stations around the coastline. The stations were named Chain Home (CH). Radar detection of objects at that time was at its early stages of development and there was a need for a method to combine the different radar information gathered from different stations.

Accurate details of incoming or outgoing aircraft were obtained by combining overlapping reports from adjacent radar stations and then collating and correcting them. This process of combining information was called "filtering" and took place in seven Filter Rooms. Each filter room was attached to a Fighter Command Group, a subordinate command covering a number of squadrons of aircraft and their airfields. The Filter Room personnel included Plotters, Filterers and Controllers. To avoid errors and delays, clear English was insisted upon. A shortage of fighter aircraft, trained pilots and fuel created a need for filter room personnel to work with great speed.

Plotters received radar information by telephone. They displayed it on a gridded map table by placing counters that indicated estimated height, number of aircraft, and Identification Friend or Foe (IFF) status. Plotters were mainly Women's Auxiliary Air Force (WAAF) personnel — young women who worked eight-hour watches in underground bunkers.

Each radar station was allocated with a colour and position plots, numbered one to five, signified time received. Filterer Officers — or 'Filterers' — filtered the information, correcting it and placing an arrow giving direction and position. The information on each track was displayed on a magnetised metal plaque.

The Filterer's job "was to decide the moment when a few successive plots, with all their possible inaccuracies, might be considered as a reliable track, fit for the operations room to act on for fighter interception". Such tracks were indicated by the Filterer placing an arrow on the table showing the position and direction of the raid. The filterers constantly had to make a relatively difficult decision of "whether to put down an arrow on the strength of his (her) first guess, or to wait for another plot in the hope that it would confirm or confound his (her) suspicions." Acting quickly gained valuable time but risked fighters taking off on false information. Waiting for more information reduced the chance of interception. Squadron Leader Mike Dean MBE, referring to the filterer's job, explained: "The mass of raw information generated by the Home Chain of radars had to be processed before it could be presented to the Operations Room. The complexity of the Filter Room task cannot be overstated. Much depended on the Filterer’s detailed knowledge of the performance and limitations of each individual radar and their confidence in the ability of the crews on watch. The Filterer’s ability to correlate the information quickly and assess the probability of the true radar picture underpinned the successful operation of the whole radar system."

Controllers were senior officers who used reports from the Movement Liaison Section to identify each track as friendly or hostile. The resulting information would then be communicated by phone by a WAAF teller to all who needed to know, including Air Raid Warning Officers, Royal Observer Corps, Anti-Aircraft Command artillery, Air Sea Rescue Centres and Group and Sector Operations Rooms who would then order fighter interceptions of the hostile aircraft. Controllers were stationed on a balcony above the filterers. The Controllers were recruited from the London Stock Exchange, typically because they were accustomed to making swift decisions under pressure.

== Radar improvements ==
As radar equipment improved, the Filter Room received additional reports from Chain Home Low (CHL) and Chain Home Extra Low (CHEL), increasing tracking accuracy. In 1944 warnings were given of V-1 flying bombs (doodle bugs) and V-2 rockets.

== See also ==
- Dowding system
