= List of Battle of Britain squadrons =

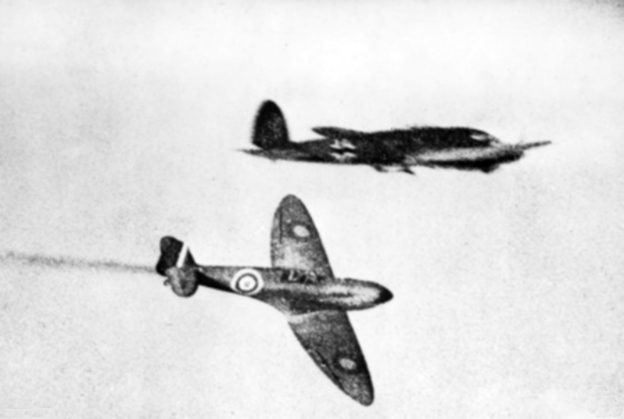
German propaganda image: A Royal Air Force Supermarine Spitfire trails smoke after attacking a German Heinkel He 111 bomber during the Battle of Britain.

This is a list of the officially accredited Battle of Britain units with their aircraft types, code letters, call signs and casualties.

On 9 November 1960, the Air Ministry published Air Ministry Order N850 which officially defined the qualifications for aircrew to be classified as having participated in the Battle of Britain. The AMO also defined the squadrons that were deemed to have fought in the battle under the control of RAF Fighter Command between 0001 hours on 10 July and 2359 hours on 31 October 1940; the official beginning and end of the battle.

A total of 71 squadrons and other units from Fighter Command, Coastal Command and the Fleet Air Arm are listed.

== Accredited squadrons ==
Squadron	Squadron code	Radio call sign	Aircraft type	Number of casualties
No. 1 Squadron RAF	JX	ACORN	Hurricane	7
No. 3 Squadron RAF	QO		Hurricane	1
No. 17 Squadron RAF	YB	EDEY	Hurricane	5
No. 19 Squadron RAF	QV	LUTON	Spitfire	6
No. 23 Squadron RAF	YP	LUTON	Blenheim	8
No. 25 Squadron RAF	ZK	LUTON	Blenheim, Beaufighter	5
No. 29 Squadron RAF	RO		Blenheim	8
No. 32 Squadron RAF	GZ	JACKO	Hurricane	2
No. 41 Squadron RAF	EB	MITOR	Spitfire	11
No. 43 Squadron RAF	FT		Hurricane	14
No. 46 (Uganda) Squadron RAF	PO	ANGEL	Hurricane	14
No. 54 Squadron RAF	KL	RABBIT	Spitfire	6
No. 56 (Punjab) Squadron RAF	US	BAFFIN	Hurricane	8
No. 64 Squadron RAF	SH	FREEMA	Spitfire	7
No. 65 (East India) Squadron RAF	YT		Spitfire	8
No. 66 Squadron RAF	LZ	FIBIUS	Spitfire	8
No. 72 (Basutoland) Squadron RAF	RN	TENNIS	Spitfire	9
No. 73 Squadron RAF	TP		Hurricane	4
No. 74 Squadron RAF	ZP	DYSOE	Spitfire	12
No. 79 (Madras Presidency) Squadron RAF	NV	PANSY	Hurricane	4
No. 85 Squadron RAF	VY	HYDRO	Hurricane	7
No. 87 (United Provinces) Squadron RAF	LK	SUNCUP	Hurricane	7
No. 92 (East India) Squadron RAF	QJ	GANNIC	Spitfire	14
No. 111 Squadron RAF	JU	WAGON	Hurricane	11
No. 141 Squadron RAF	TW		Boulton Paul Defiant	10
No. 145 Squadron RAF	SO	PATIN	Hurricane	13
No. 151 Squadron RAF	DZ		Hurricane	11
No. 152 (Hyderabad) Squadron RAF	UM	MAIDA	Spitfire	14
No. 213 (Ceylon) Squadron RAF	AK	BEARSKIN	Hurricane	15
No. 219 (Mysore) Squadron RAF	FK		Blenheim, Beaufighter	6
No. 222 (Natal) Squadron RAF	ZD	KOTEL	Spitfire	9
No. 229 Squadron RAF	RE	KETA	Hurricane	5
No. 232 Squadron RAF	EF		Hurricane	–
No. 234 (Madras Presidency) Squadron RAF	AZ	CRESSY	Spitfire	5
No. 238 Squadron RAF	VK		Hurricane	17
No. 242 (Canadian) Squadron RAF	LE	LORAG	Hurricane	5
No. 245 (Northern Rhodesia) Squadron RAF	DX		Hurricane	2
No. 247 (China – British) Squadron RAF	HP		Gloster Gladiator	–
No. 249 (Gold Coast) Squadron RAF	GN	GANER	Hurricane	8
No. 253 (Hyderabad) Squadron RAF	SW	VICEROY	Hurricane	11
No. 257 (Burma) Squadron RAF	DT	ALERT	Hurricane	11
No. 263 (Fellowship of the Bellows) Squadron RAF	HE		Hurricane, Westland Whirlwind	1
No. 264 (Madras Presidency) Squadron RAF	PS		Boulton Paul Defiant	18
No. 266 (Rhodesia) Squadron RAF	UO		Spitfire	7
No. 421 Flight RAF	L-Z		Hurricane, Spitfire	1
No. 422 Flight RAF	–		Hurricane	–
Fighter Interception Unit	–		Hurricane, Blenheim, Beaufighter	–
Auxiliary Squadrons				
No. 501 (County of Gloucester) Squadron AuxAF	SD	MANDREL	Hurricane	19
No. 504 (City of Nottingham) Squadron AuxAF	TM		Hurricane	6
No. 600 (City of London) Squadron AuxAF	BQ		Blenheim, Beaufighter	9
No. 601 (County of London) Squadron AuxAF	UF	WEAPON	Hurricane, Spitfire	14
No. 602 (City of Glasgow) Squadron AuxAF	LO	VILLA	Spitfire	5
No. 603 (City of Edinburgh) Squadron AuxAF	XT	VIKEN	Spitfire	13
No. 604 (County of Middlesex) Squadron AuxAF	NG	TALLYHO	Blenheim, Beaufighter	3
No. 605 (County of Warwick) Squadron AuxAF	UP	TURKEY	Hurricane	8
No. 607 (County of Durham) Squadron AuxAF	AF		Hurricane	9
No. 609 (West Riding) Squadron AuxAF	PR	SORBO	Spitfire	7
No. 610 (County of Chester) Squadron AuxAF	DW	DOGROSE	Spitfire	11
No. 611 (West Lancashire) Squadron AuxAF	FY	CHARLIE	Spitfire	2
No. 615 (County of Surrey) Squadron AuxAF	KW	PANTA	Hurricane	6
No. 616 (South Yorkshire) Squadron AuxAF	QJ	RADPOE	Spitfire	6
Commonwealth and Allied squadrons				
No. 1 Squadron RCAF (Canadian)	YO	CARIBOU	Hurricane	3
302 (City of Poznan) Squadron (Polish)	WX	CALEB	Hurricane	6
303 (Warsaw – Kosciuszko) Squadron (Polish)	RF	APANY	Hurricane	8
No. 310 (Czechoslovak) Squadron (Czech)	NN	CALLA	Hurricane	4
No. 312 (Czechoslovak) Squadron (Czech)	DU	SILVO	Hurricane	1
Coastal Command Squadrons				
No. 235 Squadron RAF	QY		Blenheim	9
No. 236 Squadron RAF	FA		Blenheim	10
No. 248 Squadron RAF	WR		Blenheim	16
Fleet Air Arm (FAA) Squadrons				
No. 804 Squadron FAA	5-		Gloster Sea Gladiator/Grumman Martlet	–
No. 808 Squadron FAA	5-		Fairey Fulmar	–

== See also ==
Royal Air Force

- List of Royal Air Force aircraft squadrons
- List of Royal Air Force aircraft independent flights
- List of conversion units of the Royal Air Force
- List of Royal Air Force Glider units
- List of Royal Air Force Operational Training Units
- List of Royal Air Force schools
- List of Royal Air Force units & establishments
- List of RAF squadron codes
- List of RAF Regiment units
- List of wings of the Royal Air Force
- Royal Air Force roundels

Army Air Corps

- List of Army Air Corps aircraft units

Fleet Air Arm

- List of Fleet Air Arm aircraft squadrons
- List of Fleet Air Arm groups
- List of aircraft units of the Royal Navy
- List of aircraft wings of the Royal Navy

Others

- List of Air Training Corps squadrons
- University Air Squadron
- Air Experience Flight
- Volunteer Gliding Squadron
- United Kingdom military aircraft registration number
- United Kingdom aircraft test serials
- British military aircraft designation systems
