= Transport in Wales =

Overview of the transport system in Wales

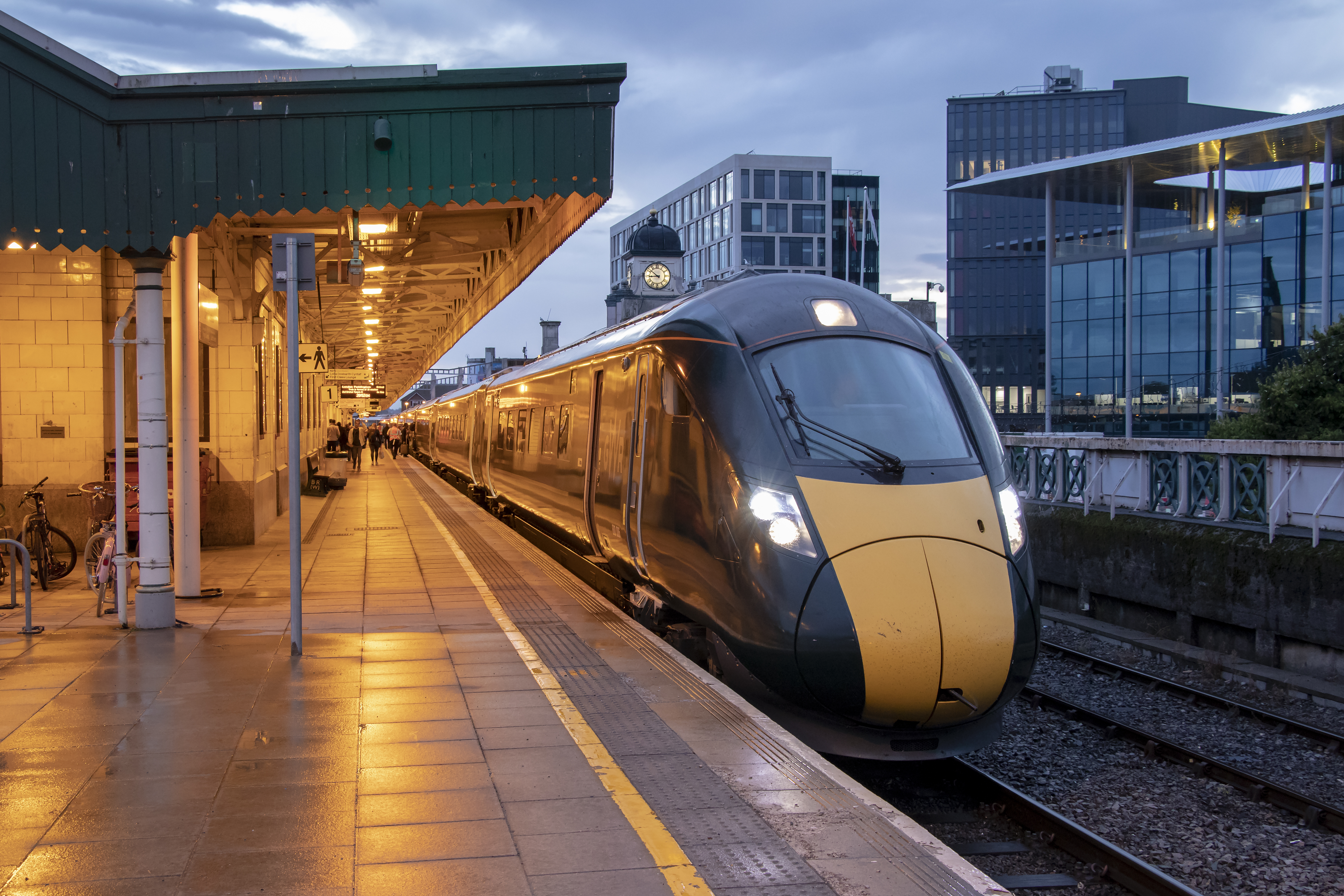
A Class 800 bi-mode multiple unit at Cardiff Central, on a service bound for London Paddington on the Great Western Main Line

Transport in Wales is influenced heavily by the country's geography. Wales is predominantly hilly or mountainous; its main settlements lie on the coasts of north and south Wales, while mid and west Wales are lightly populated. The main transport corridors are east–west routes, with many continuing eastwards into England.

== Railways ==
The railway network of Wales (2020)

=== History ===
Wales' railway network developed in conjunction with that of the rest of Great Britain during the 19th century. The North Wales Coast Line and South Wales Main Line sought to profit from traffic between London and Ireland. Numerous railways were built to export coal and iron from South Wales, and slate from North Wales. In the latter half of the century, tourism was booming and railways served resorts such as Llandudno, Barry Island and locations along the Cambrian Coast Line.

The network was rationalised during the 20th century, particularly by the Beeching cuts, with mainly east–west routes retained; as a result, the railway network within Wales is no longer contiguous. Devolution led to the formation of a single franchise for Wales in 2003. The Wales & Borders franchise, which includes some railway lines in England for completeness, is currently operated by Transport for Wales Rail. As railway usage has grown during the past decades, several freight lines have seen railway services reintroduced, including the Cardiff City Line, the Vale of Glamorgan Line and the Ebbw Valley Railway. In 2008, there were 923 miles (1,485 km) of main line railways in Wales. (Note: According to the Wales Route Utilisation Strategy – Draft for Consultation published by Network Rail in 2008, there are 678 miles (1,091 km) of railways in Wales, not counting the heritage lines.)

=== Routes and operators ===
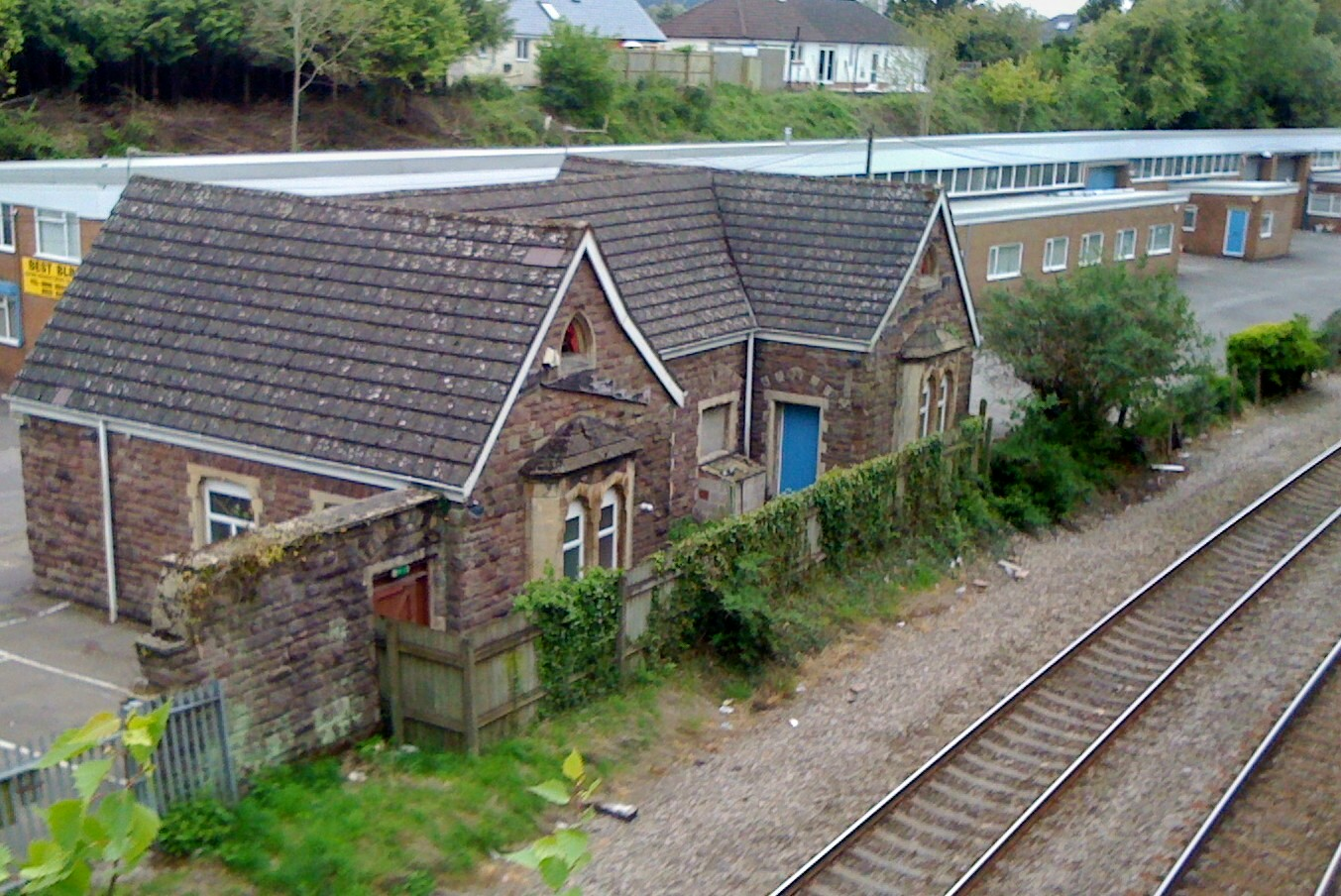
The station buildings in Caerleon, awaiting platform rebuilding and station reopening on the Welsh Marches Line

Services are operated by four train operating companies on the following routes:

Transport for Wales operates all main line services within the principality, with some in North West England:

- Rural lines, such as the Welsh Marches Line and the Cardiff commuter lines
- Long-distance routes between North and South Wales, via Chester, Wrexham General and Shrewsbury
- Long-distance routes to Manchester Piccadilly, Crewe, Birmingham International and Gloucester.

Great Western Railway operates services on two lines:

- South Wales Main Line to London Paddington from Carmarthen, Swansea, Cardiff Central and Newport
- Cardiff to Portsmouth Harbour, via Bristol Temple Meads, Bath Spa and Southampton Central.

Avanti West Coast:

- North Wales Main Line between Holyhead and London Euston, via Llandudno Junction, Chester and Crewe.

CrossCountry:

- Services between Cardiff Central, Birmingham New Street and Nottingham.

The bulk of railway transport in Wales today is concentrated in the south, with Cardiff Central, Cardiff Queen Street, Newport, Swansea and Cardiff Bay being the busiest stations. Most passengers travel on east–west routes. In 2018–2019, there were 33.5 million rail passenger journeys which either started or ended in Wales, including 24.0 million journeys within Wales; Cardiff was the destination for almost 44% of these journeys.

In the north, the bulk of rail travel is concentrated around Wrexham General and the Llandudno Junction to Chester section. The South Wales Main Line has been electrified as far west as Cardiff Central. Owing to the closure of the line between Swansea and Aberystwyth in the 1960s, and the absence of other north–south routes, it is very problematic to travel from Swansea to Caernarfon by rail.

There are regional metro bus and rail improvement programmes in South East Wales, South West Wales and North Wales, with the latter including proposals for an extension of a railway line from Bangor down to meet the Cambrian Coast Line.

A more direct railway route linking North and South Wales has been proposed.

=== Urban rail ===
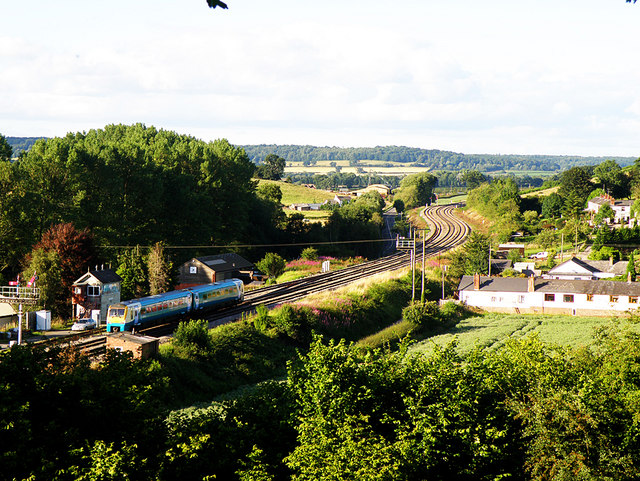
Arriva Trains Wales at the former Pontrilas station on the Welsh Marches Line; it has been proposed for reopening

The only form of commuter rail system in Wales is the Valley Lines network serving Cardiff and the South Wales valleys, serving 20 stations in Cardiff and 61 stations in the surrounding area. The service frequency at the core of the network is up to every five minutes.

=== Trams ===
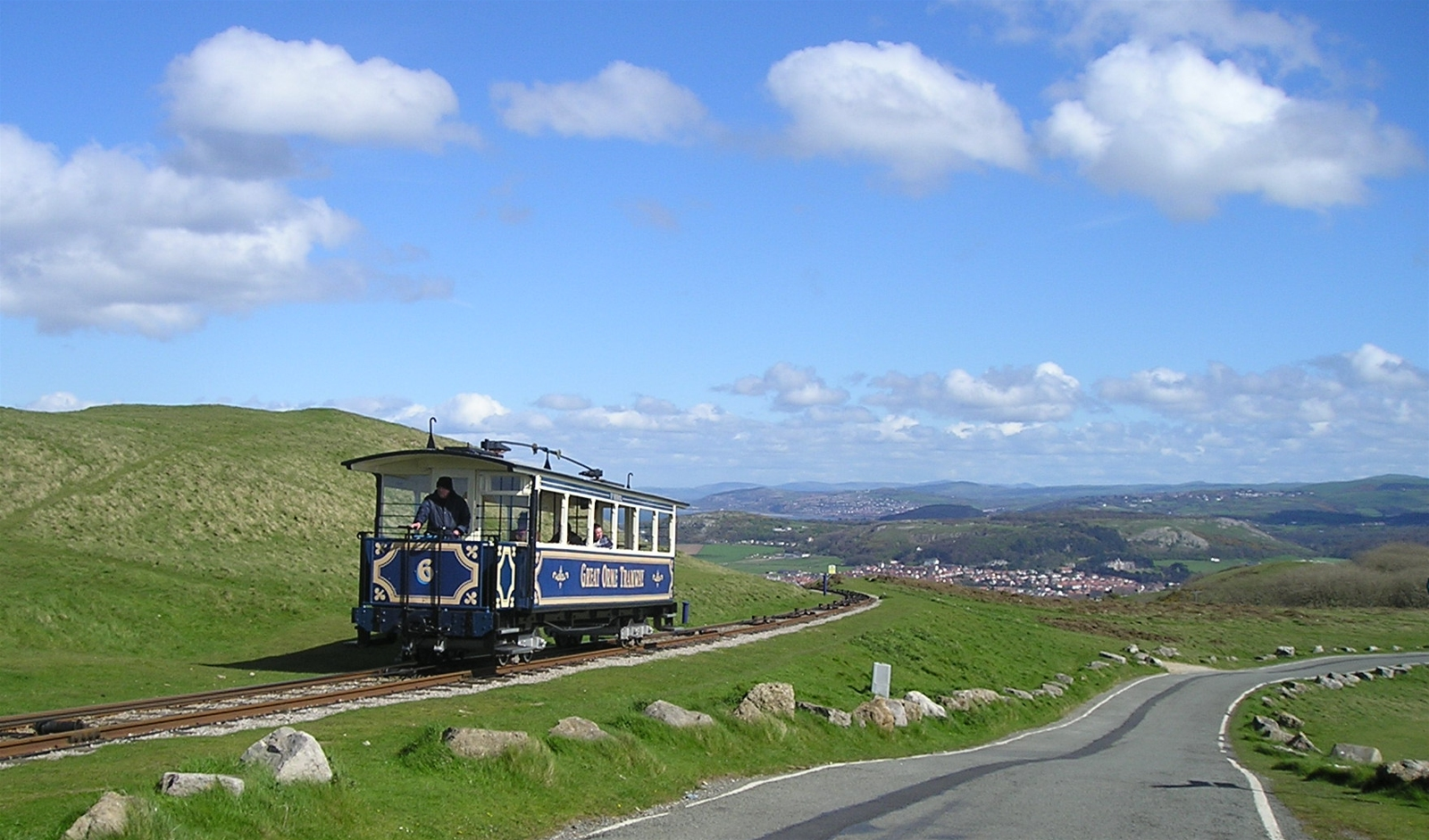
The Great Orme Tramway in Llandudno

The only surviving first-generation tram service in Wales is the Great Orme Tramway, a cable-hauled tramway in Llandudno on the Great Orme; it survives as a tourist attraction.

Cardiff, Swansea and Newport had extensive tram systems until the mid-20th century. Plans were mooted in the late 1990s for a modern tram system to serve Cardiff's urban areas, but these were shelved due to the costs of building and maintaining such a system.

The world's first passenger tram service was the Mumbles Railway in Swansea, initially horse-drawn but later operated by steam and electric trams.

The Llandudno and Colwyn Bay tramway, demolished in 1956, has a preservation society which has restored some original carriages.

The Welsh Valley Lines are being upgraded to a new South Wales Metro system, which will consist of Rapid Transit lines serving Barry Island, Rhoose, Newport, Rhymney and Coryton. This includes multiple tram lines through Cardiff and the surrounding commuter towns, partially running on abandoned railway lines, existing lines, and a small portion of street running to Cardiff Bay and Roath Lock.

The first four of these lines will open in 2026, with three other lines planned. The trams will serve Aberdare, Treherbert, Radyr, Caerphilly, Merthyr Tydfil, Pontypridd and Cardiff city centre. There are also plans for a cross-city tramway from St Mellons to Creigiau, via Splott, Cardiff Bay, Cardiff Central and Ely

=== Heritage railways ===
Wales has a large number of preserved railways. Some of these were former industrial narrow gauge railways, such as the Corris Railway; others were formed from portions disused standard gauge railways, either kept as standard gauge, such as Barry Tourist Railway, or converted to narrow gauge like the Brecon Mountain Railway. Some of the narrow gauge heritage railways are marketed as the Great Little Trains of Wales.

Notable heritage railways include:

- Talyllyn Railway: the first railway in the world to be saved by a preservation society
- Ffestiniog Railway: the oldest surviving railway company in the world
- Gwili Railway: the first standard gauge preserved railway to operate in Wales
- Snowdon Mountain Railway: the only rack and pinion railway in the United Kingdom
- Vale of Rheidol Railway: the last steam railway owned by British Rail until 1989
- Welsh Highland Railway: linking the Ffestiniog Railway at Porthmadog to Caernarfon.

== Roads ==
The trunk road network carries around a third of road traffic in Wales. Around 80% of traffic on Welsh roads is cars, taxis and minibuses, mainly on east–west routes in north and south Wales.

=== South Wales ===
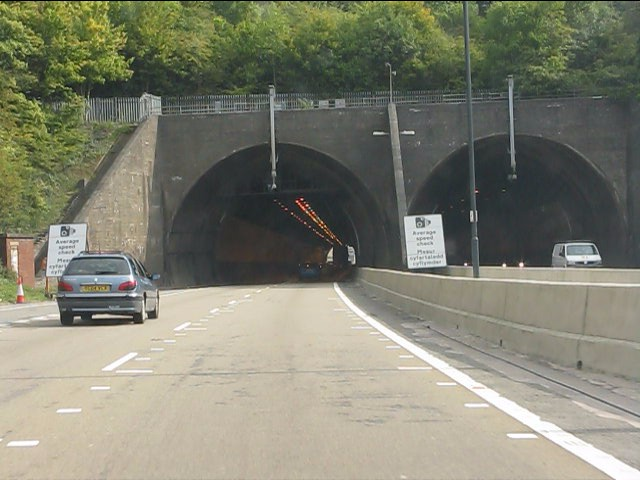
The Brynglas Tunnels are a prominent landmark on the M4 motorway

Wales has 83 mi (134 km) of motorway, all of which are in the south. The major artery is the M4, which enters Wales via the Second Severn Crossing and terminates at Pont Abraham in Carmarthenshire. The M4 in South Wales has 27 junctions and is an important route between the main urban areas in the region. It links Llanelli, Swansea, Neath, Port Talbot, Bridgend, Cardiff and Newport directly to London and the rest of southern England, and indirectly to the Midlands via the A449, A40 and M50.

Following construction of the new bridge, the original Severn Bridge which crosses the river further upstream at Chepstow, was renumbered the M48 motorway. Tolls were once collected upon entering Wales using either of the two bridges; these were abolished in 2018. The A48(M) is a small spur from the M4, from west Newport to east Cardiff.

The second major road is the A470 dual carriageway that connects Cardiff with the South Wales Valleys towns. It suffers from severe congestion, especially during peak hours, due to significant commuting to the Cardiff area.

The A465 Heads of the Valleys road, currently being upgraded to dual carriageway, provides a link between the M4 near Neath across the Heads of the Valleys to Abergavenny, Monmouth and England's West Midlands via the A40 and M50.

=== North Wales ===
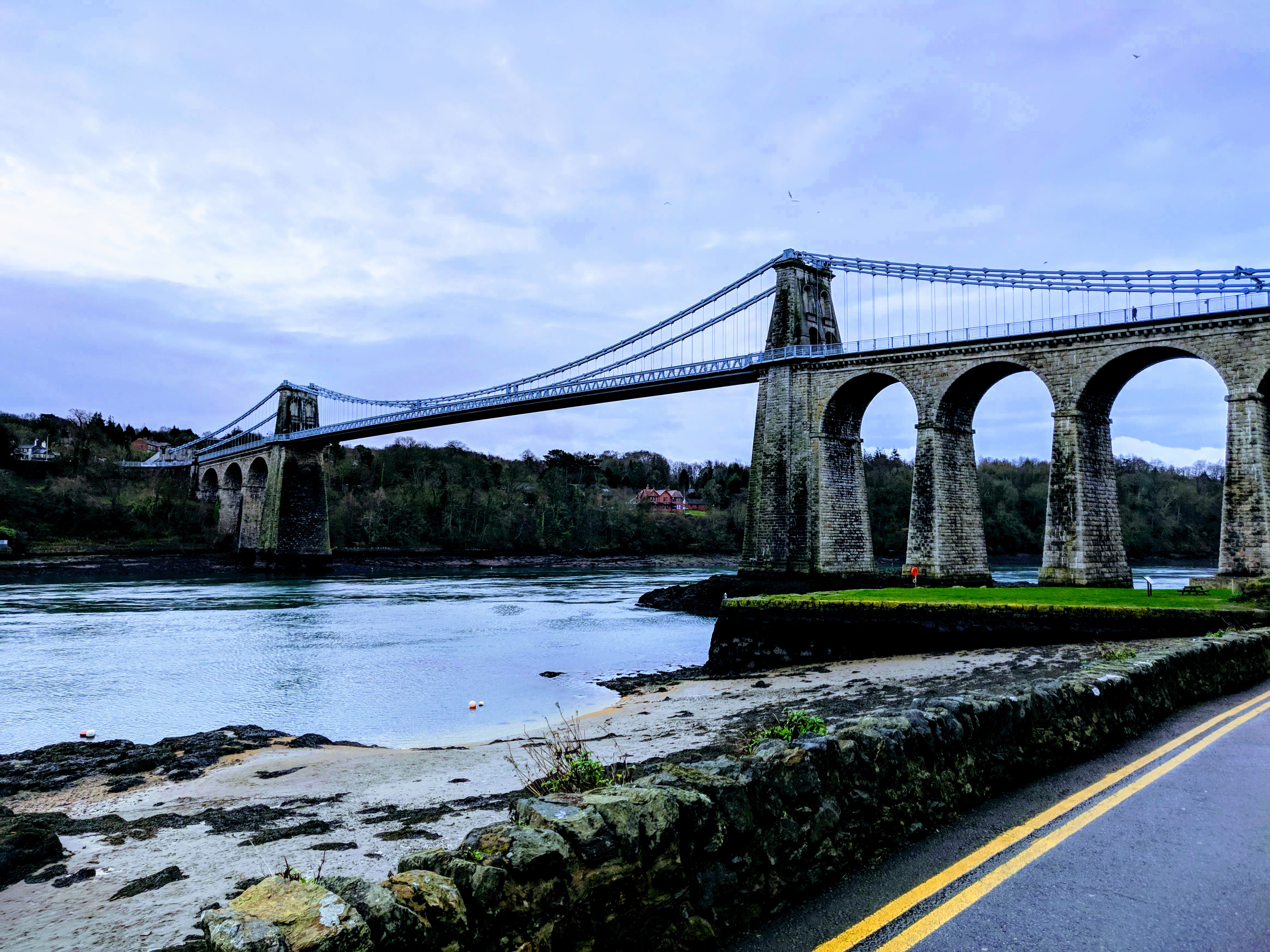
The Menai Suspension Bridge spans the Menai Strait between the North Wales mainland and Anglesey; it was completed in 1826 to allow road traffic to access the island

One of the main arteries for North Wales is the A494, running from Queensferry (near to the English border) to Dolgellau. The road begins from the M56 motorway, connecting North Wales with Chester and Manchester Airport, both in England. The A55 runs from Holyhead, (Note: For ferry connections to Ireland.) Conwy, Llandudno Junction and Rhyl to a junction with the M53 motorway near Chester.

One of the oldest roads, the A5 runs from the port of Holyhead south-east to Bangor then down through Snowdonia to Betws-y-Coed, Corwen, Llangollen and over the English border south of Chirk. This route has served as the main passage for London-Dublin traffic for many years although its usage has been superseded by the A55 coast road. It is now more famed as a scenic route and notorious for many Bank Holiday traffic jams.

=== North–south ===
Two routes serve as the main north–south links:

- The A483 begins near Swansea and takes a north-easterly route to Ammanford, Llandeilo, Llandovery, Llanwrtyd Wells, Builth Wells, Llandrindod Wells, Newtown, Welshpool, Oswestry and Wrexham, finally ending at Chester.
- The A470 begins in Cardiff Bay and passes through the city, north-to-north-westerly, on to Pontypridd, Abercynon, Merthyr Tydfil, Brecon, Builth Wells, Rhayader, Llangurig, Llanidloes, Llandinam, Commins Coch, Mallwyd, Trawsfynydd, Blaenau Ffestiniog, Dolwyddelan and Betws-y-Coed, terminating at Llandudno. It is a dual carriageway between Cardiff and Merthyr, where it meets the Heads of the Valleys Road, the A465), and the section of this route into Cardiff is used heavily.

== Buses and coaches ==
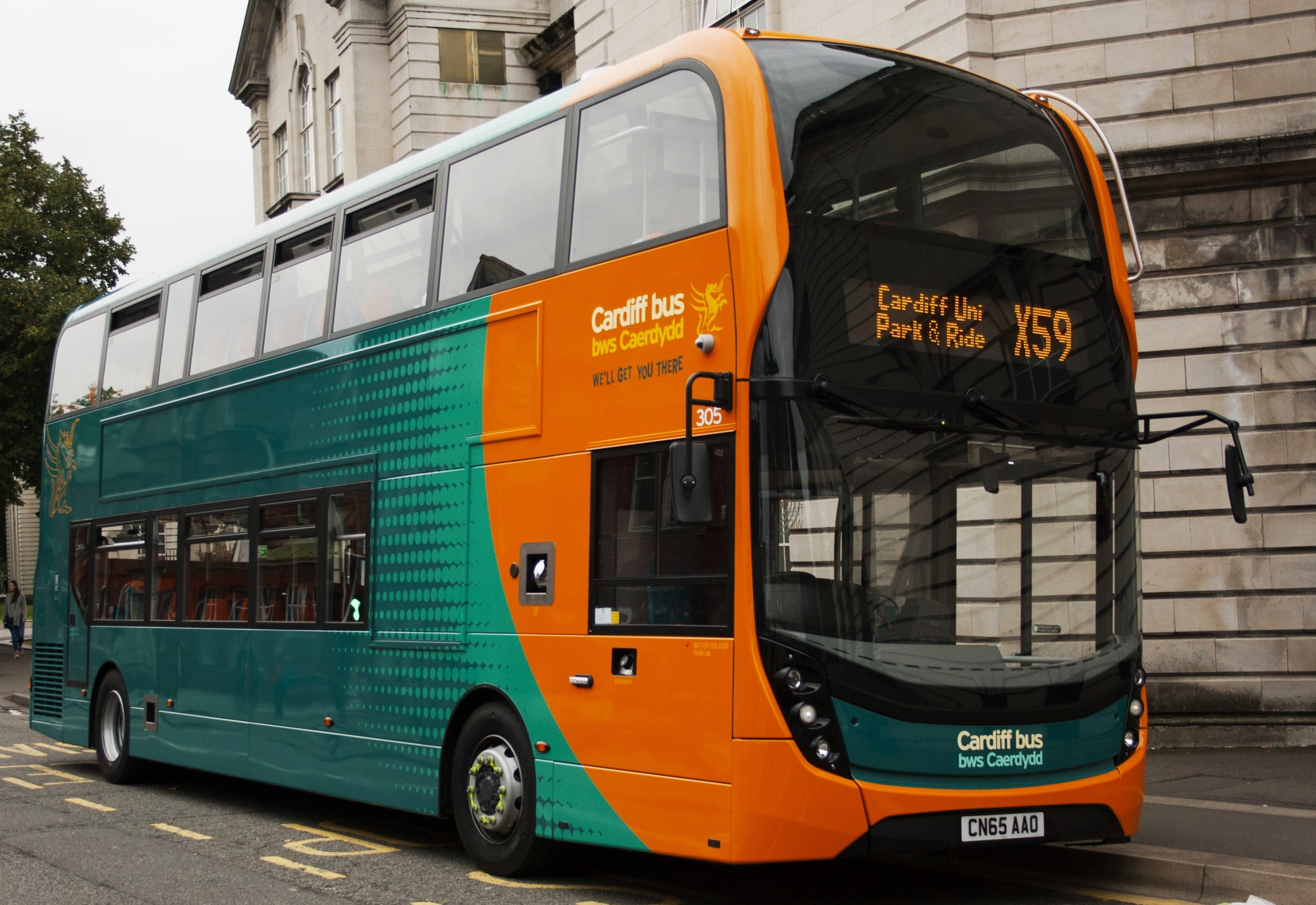
A Cardiff Bus in the capital city

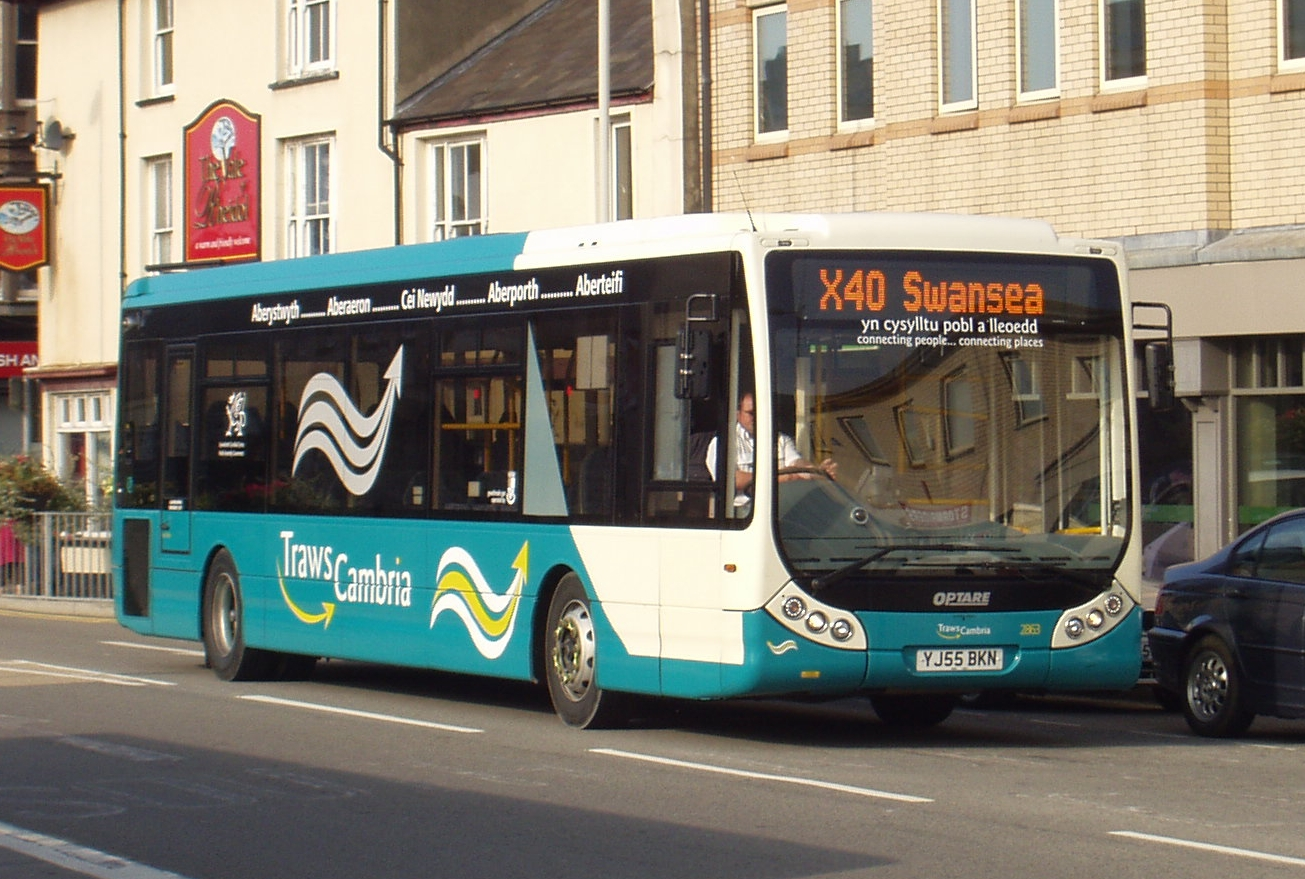
Optare Tempo in Aberystwyth, on TrawsCambria inter-urban service X40

=== Local bus operators ===
Bus services are predominantly provided by the council-owned Cardiff Bus and Newport Bus in their respective cities; the main private sector operators in Wales are:

- Adventure Travel, which provides services around Cardiff and Swansea
- Arriva Buses Wales, which provides services throughout North Wales
- First Cymru, which offers services centred on Bridgend, Neath Port Talbot, Swansea, Llanelli, Carmarthen, Haverfordwest and South Pembrokeshire; it also provides a key link from Bridgend/Swansea to Cardiff
- Stagecoach South Wales, which provides services on a number of routes centred on Cardiff and the South Wales Valleys.

=== National bus routes ===
TrawsCymru is a network of longer-distance bus services, which is sponsored by the Welsh Government; it is part of the integrated public transport network in Wales that includes buses, trains, walking and cycling. Routes are:

- T1, T1A, T1X, T1C: Carmarthen - Aberystwyth
- T2, T28: Bangor - Aberystwyth, via Caernarfon, Porthmadog, Dolgellau and Machynlleth
- T3: Barmouth - Wrexham, via Dolgellau, Bala and Corwen
- T4: Newtown - Merthyr Tydfil, via Llandrindod Wells, Builth Wells and Brecon
- T5: Haverfordwest - Aberystwyth, via Fishguard, Cardigan, New Quay and Aberaeron
- T6: Brecon - Swansea, via Ystradgynlais and Neath
- T7: Chepstow - Bristol
- T8: Corwen - Chester, via Ruthin and Mold
- T10: Bangor - Corwen, via Betws-y-Coed
- T11: Haverfordwest - Fishguard, via St Davids
- T22: Blaenau Ffestiniog - Caernarfon
- T51: Rhyl - Wrexham, via Denbigh and Ruthin.

Fflecsi is a demand-responsive transport initiative run by Transport for Wales, in partnership with local councils and bus operators. It offers a flexible alternative to traditional bus services, especially in areas where fixed routes may not be viable. It is designed to replace or complement scheduled bus routes but, instead of fixed timetables and stops, Fflecsi buses pick up and drop off passengers within a designated service area, based on bookings made. The service uses technology to dynamically route buses according to passenger demand.

=== Coach services ===
National Express provides services from major towns in North Wales to Liverpool, Manchester, Birmingham, London, Newcastle, Leeds and Bradford. In South Wales, its direct services operate to Bristol, Gatwick Airport, Heathrow Airport and London. Services also operate from Cardiff and Newport to Birmingham, Nottingham, Bradford, Sheffield and Hull.

Flixbus operates coach services across the UK, serving the Welsh settlements of Bridgend, Cardiff, Holyhead, Newport and Swansea.

== Ports ==
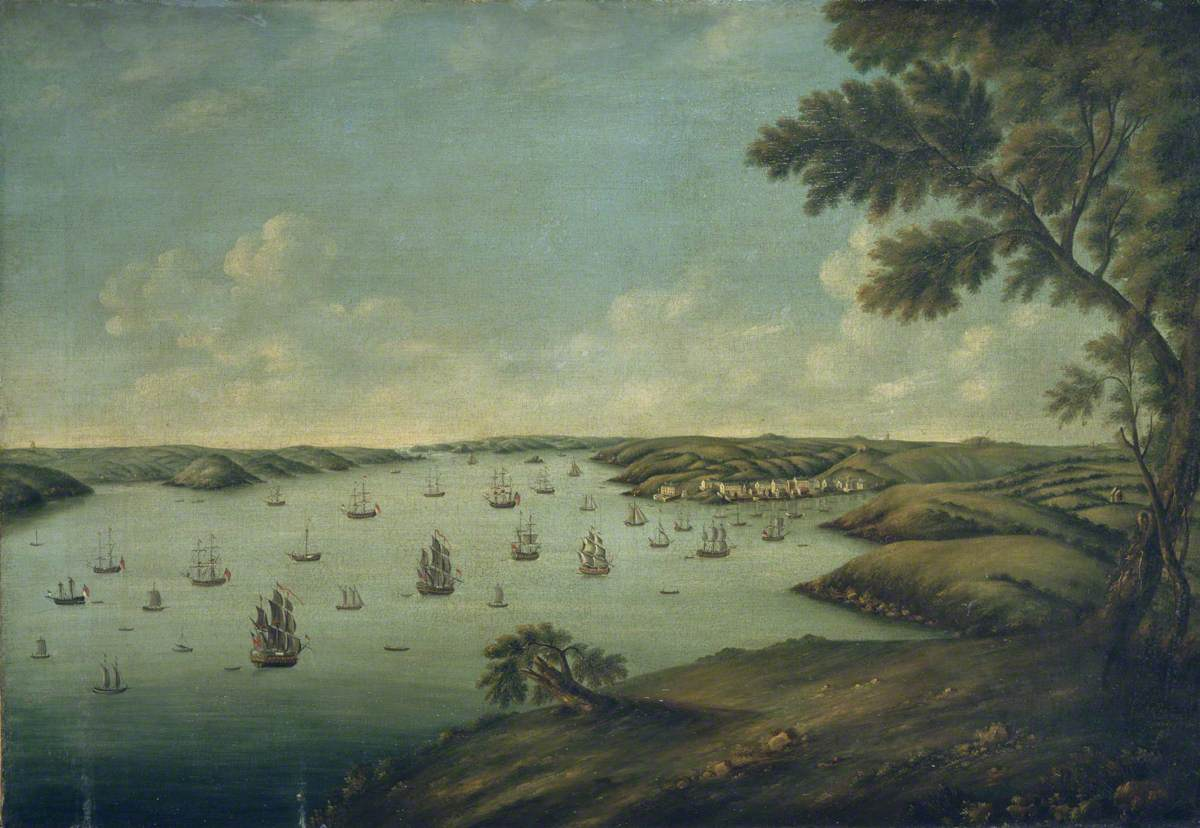
Milford Haven in 1776; the port still handles over 60% of the country's sea freight by weight

Milford Haven is the fourth-largest port in the UK in terms of tonnage and the busiest for oil products. Newport is the busiest in the UK for iron and steel, and Port Talbot is the third-busiest for ores. Port Talbot has the deepest berthing facilities in the Severn estuary and is one of only a few harbours in the UK capable of handling Capesize vessels of up to 170,000 tonnes deadweight (DWT).

In 2005, the freight tonnage share of Welsh ports was:

- Milford Haven – 63.7%
- Port Talbot Docks – 14.5%
- Holyhead – 7%
- Newport Docks – 6.7%
- Cardiff Docks – 4.2%
- Swansea Docks – 1.2%
- Fishguard – 0.9%
- Barry – 0.8%
- Neath – 0.7%
- Mostyn – 0.3%.

=== Ferries ===
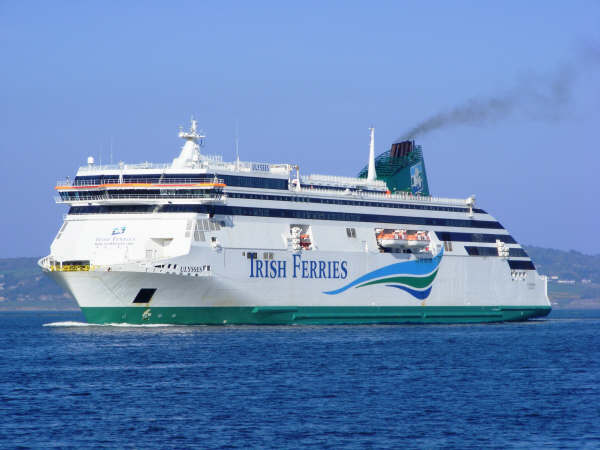
MV Ulysses, the largest ferry on the Irish Sea, plying from Holyhead to Dublin Port

Welsh ports provide passenger and freight ferry services. In 2005, 3.2 million sea passengers travelled to and from Ireland. Holyhead, the third largest passenger ferry port in the UK, handled over 2.3 million passengers; Fishguard and Milford Haven (Pembroke Dock) handled over 800,000 passengers a year.

The Cardiff Waterbus runs along the river Taff, connecting the city centre with Cardiff Bay and Penarth.

=== SailRail ===
Transport for Wales, Iarnród Éireann, Irish Ferries and Stena Line promote SailRail

From South Wales, SailRail uses West Wales Lines to Fishguard Harbour, the Stena Line service to Rosslare Europort and the Iarnród Éireann trains to Dublin Connolly, on the Dublin–Rosslare railway line. From North Wales, the North Wales Coast Main Line connects Holyhead with a choice of ferries, either Stena Line or Irish Ferries, to Dublin Port for connecting buses to Connolly.

== Canals ==
The five canals that remain navigable or partially-navigable are the Llangollen Canal and Montgomery Canal, which are connected to the English network, and three that are more isolated: the Monmouthshire and Brecon Canal, Neath and Tennant Canal and Swansea Canal.

== Cycling ==
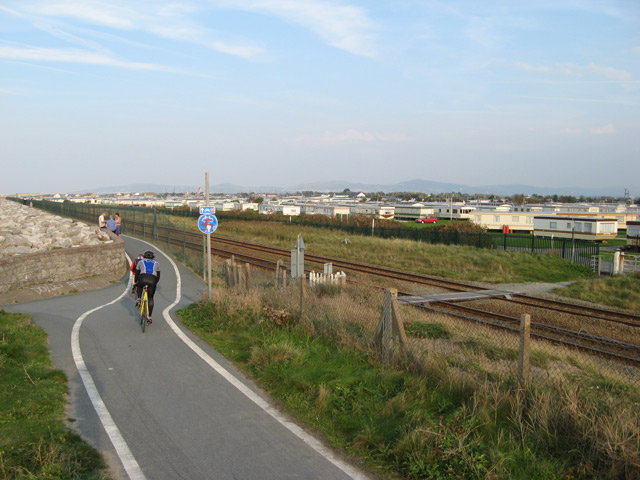
National Cycle Route 5/Wales Coast Path, Conwy

According to the National Survey for Wales 2024-25, 7% of the population actively travelled by bicycle at least once a week. The data suggests that cycling in Wales is male-dominated; 14% of men said they cycle at least once per month for active travel purposes this period, compared to only 7% of women.

The Active Travel (Wales) Act was passed in 2013, which requires ministers and Welsh local authorities to map active travel routes and networks across the country; it also requires ministers to "report on active transport in Wales".

In 2018, Cardiff City Council announced plans to develop a Cycle Superhighway network, similar to that which exists in London. The project has since been rebranded and six new Cycleways have been proposed in the city; the scheme is due to be completed over a 15-year period and is aimed at promoting active travel by bicycle in the city. The first five routes are due to open at the end of the first phase of the project in 2021.

Despite Cardiff's Cycleways scheme, Flintshire is Wales' top local authority for active travel by bicycle; in the National Survey for Wales (2017–18), almost 18% of respondents in Flintshire said that they travel at least once per month by bicycle, compared to just over 16% of respondents in Cardiff. Fewer than 4% of the respondents in Carmarthenshire, Newport, Denbighshire and Blaenau Gwent said that they actively travel by bicycle at least once per month.

Sustrans maintains several routes in Wales which form part of the National Cycle Network. Major routes include National Cycle Route 8, which runs from Cardiff to Holyhead, and National Cycle Route 47, which is also known as the Celtic Trail.

== Airports ==
Cardiff Airport is the only major international and domestic airport for Wales.

In South Wales, the air travel market is estimated to be in the region of 3.5 million passengers, half of whom are served by Cardiff Airport while the remainder travels mainly to Heathrow, Bristol and Gatwick. Over three-quarters of passengers passing through Cardiff are from international flights, with the remainder are domestic passengers mainly travelling between Cardiff and Belfast, Edinburgh, Newcastle, Glasgow or Jersey.

The North Wales air passenger market is small and Manchester, Liverpool and Birmingham airports provide the main access.

An air service with a flight time of around one hour between Cardiff and Anglesey started in May 2007, with two return flights a day; it attracted 40,000 passengers over the first 2½ years. It was originally run by Highland Airways but, after that company's closure, was taken over on a temporary basis by Isle of Man-based company Manx2 (later Citywing) in 2010. The final operator was Eastern Airways. The service was suspended in March 2020 and was cancelled permanently in June 2022.

Cardiff is the sole airport in Wales for air freight and is ranked 19th in the UK in terms of freight movement; however, Airbus flies out some of the aircraft wings it produces in its Broughton plant.

== Cable car ==
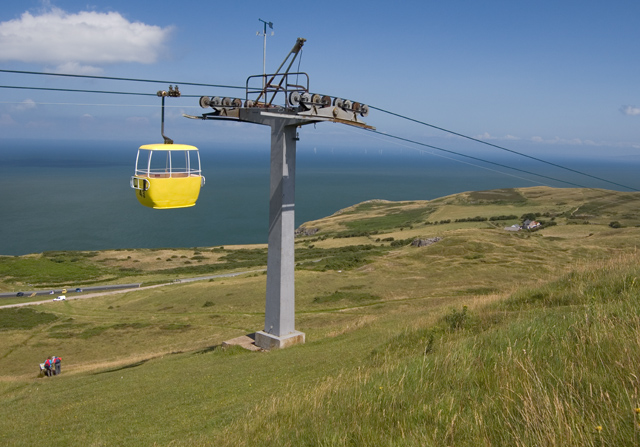
The Great Orme cable car

The Llandudno Cable Car operates from Happy Valley Gardens to the summit of Great Orme. The nine-minute journey provides a view of the bay, the Victorian promenade and the surrounding North Wales coastline. At just over 1 mile (1.6 km) each way, it is the longest aerial cabin lift of its type in the UK.

== See also ==
- Cycling in Cardiff
- List of railway stations in Wales
- Transport in the United Kingdom
- Traws Link Cymru.
