= Manx2 =

Virtual airline from the Isle of Man

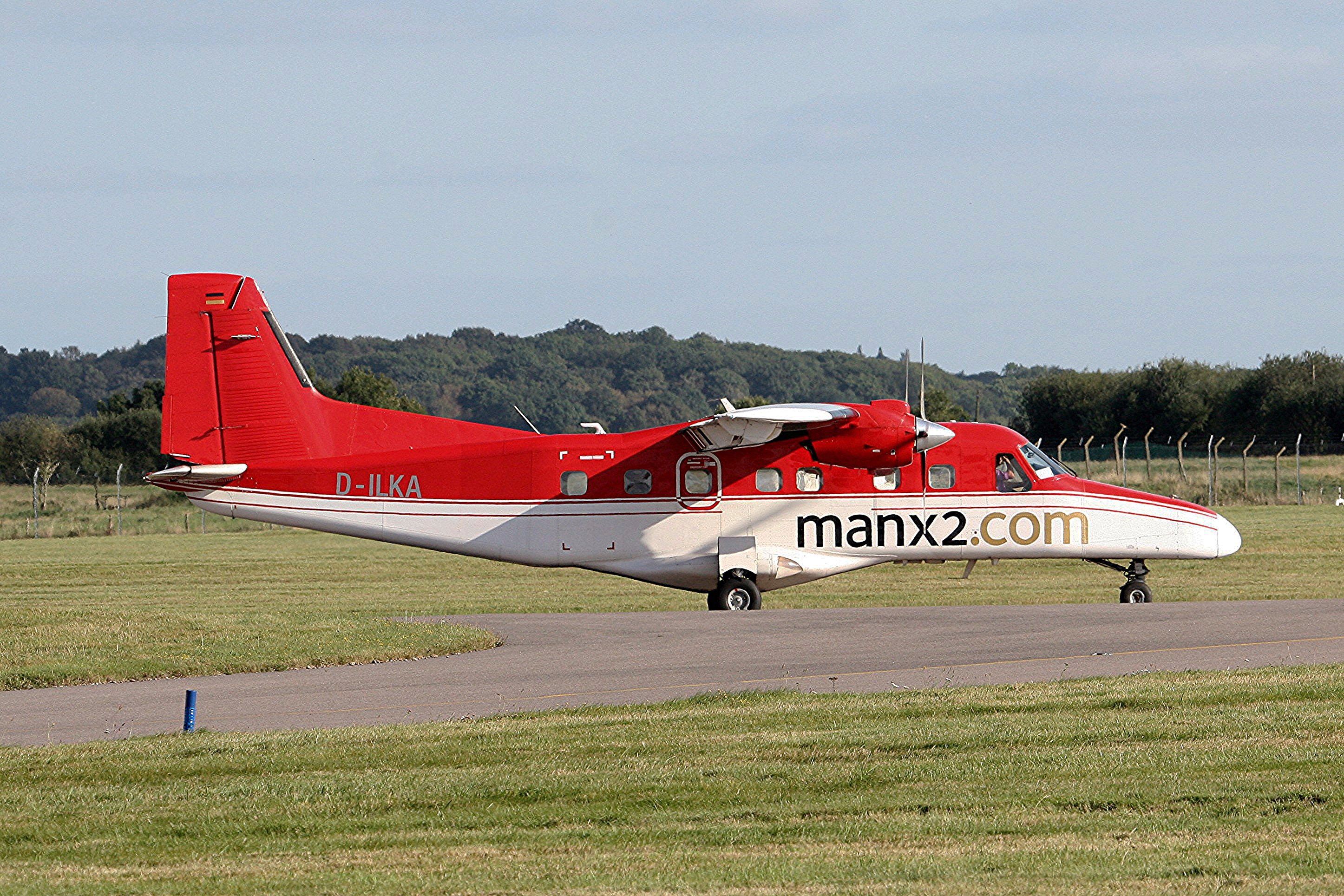
- Dornier 228
- Founded: 11 May 2006
- Commenced operations: 15 July 2006
- Ceased operations: 31 December 2012
- Hubs: Ronaldsway Isle of Man Airport
- Key people: Noel Hayes (Chairman); David Buck (MD)

Manx2 was a virtual commuter airline with its head office in Hangar 9, Isle of Man Airport in Ballasalla, Malew, Isle of Man. It marketed flights and services from several airports in the UK, including Belfast City, Blackpool, Cardiff and Isle of Man. The flights were operated by a number of airlines, including Van Air Europe, FLM Aviation and Links Air. In December 2012, the assets of Manx2 were sold to Citywing Aviation Services and Manx2's last flight took place on 31 December 2012.

== History ==
Manx2 was established on 11 May 2006, with scheduled flights starting on 15 July. Its chairman was Noel Hayes. Manx2 was founded by members of the team that set up the Blue Islands airline in the Channel Islands. On 11 July 2006, Manx2 took delivery of its first leased aircraft, a Let L-410 Turbolet. The aircraft was initially operated by BASe Air Kft (Budapest Air Services) under the call sign 'Base' and the flight code 'BPS'. The first three routes to be announced by Manx2 were from the Isle of Man to Belfast International and Blackpool on 15 July 2006, followed by Leeds Bradford on 12 August 2006.

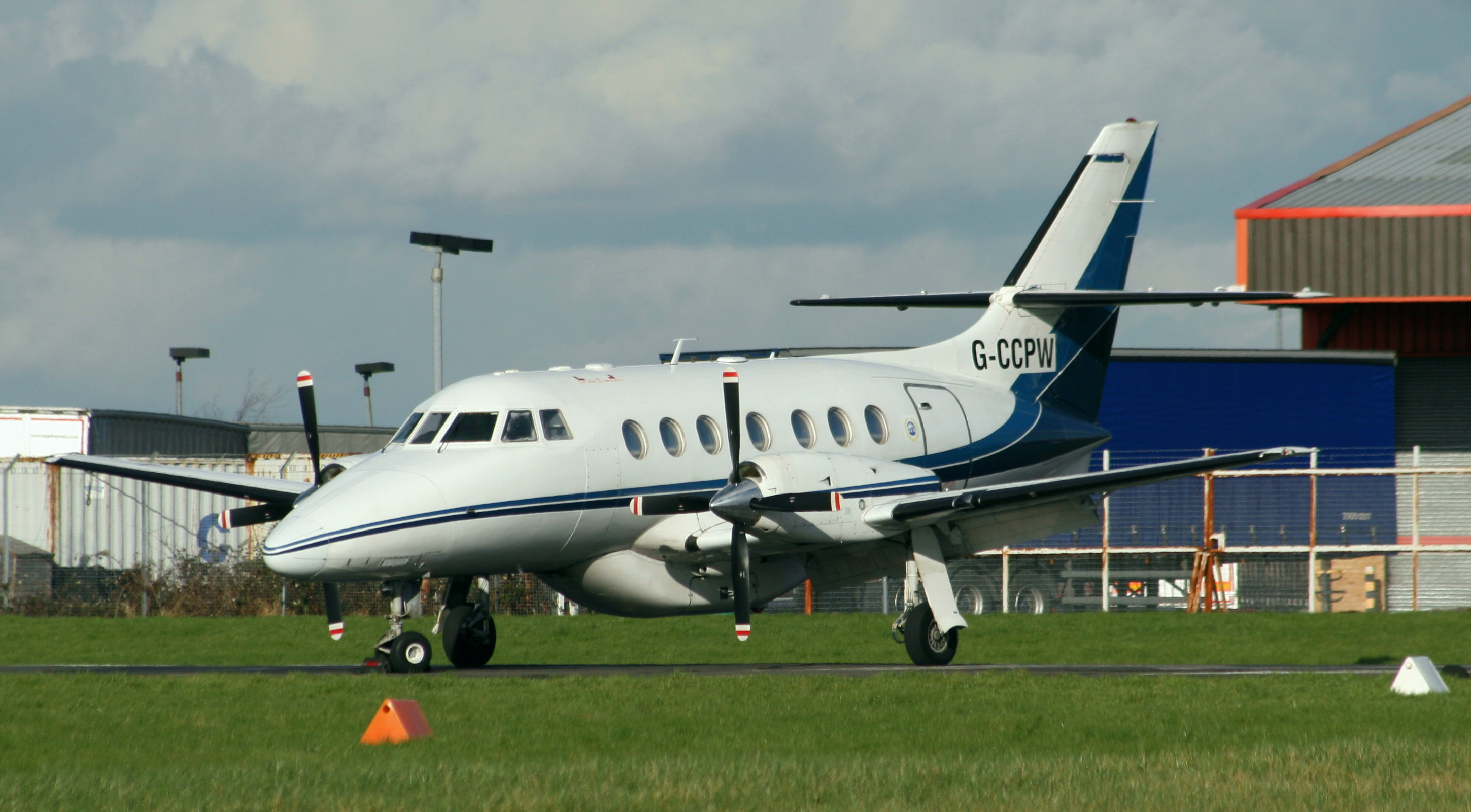
BAe Jetstream 31 at Coventry Airport in 2007

Manx2 introduced the BAe Jetstream 31 into its fleet in September 2006 with the aircraft being operated by Jetstream Executive Travel. Initially only one such aircraft was added to the fleet to operate the Isle of Man to Leeds Bradford service.

The company added a Fairchild Metroliner from Flightline BCN to its fleet for a time and extended its route network to include Belfast City. Routes to Belfast City and Blackpool were flown by two 19-seat turboprop Let L-410 aircraft from Czech operator VanAir Europe.

On 3 September 2007, Manx2 launched a new service connecting the Isle of Man with Gloucestershire Airport, located at Staverton, within an hour of major cities such as Birmingham and Bristol. This route sought to compete with Flybe's service to Birmingham. The route also had a seasonal extension to Jersey on Saturdays. In 2008, Manx 2 added two Dornier 228s to its fleet and carried 100,000 passengers that year. A third Dornier 228 was added in 2009, the year the airline announced it had carried its 250,000th passenger. It also announced an increased frequency of five flights daily on its main route from Blackpool and additional flights to Belfast City. The flagship route to Blackpool was subsequently increased to ten flights per day after the company launched 15 days free parking for its customers at Blackpool airport, while the Belfast City flights surpassed the former Island flag carrier's numbers. A new base was established at Belfast City with additional frequency to the Isle of Man and Cork. The Leeds Bradford route also operated daily. The Gloucestershire route operated every weekday morning In August 2009 a new route was started to Newcastle upon Tyne, and in May 2010 the company tendered for a seven-month Public Service Obligation contract to operate the Cardiff–Isle of Anglesey route for the Welsh Assembly Government. This contract was subsequently extended for a further four years.

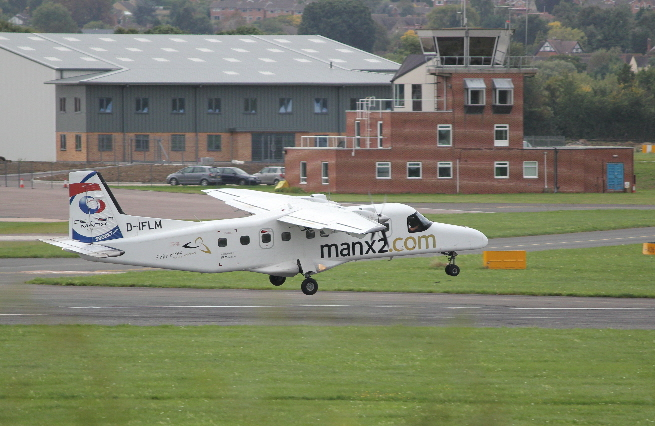
FLM Aviation-owned Dornier 228, with Manx2 livery, at Gloucestershire Airport in 2010

Shortly thereafter, Manx2 launched a service from Galway to Belfast and the Isle of Man, and in September 2010 a twice daily service between Belfast and Cork was launched. This service ceased in March 2011 following an accident and the air carrier stopped the leasing arrangement with Flightline BCN. Manx2 subsequently exited the domestic Irish market, cancelling its seasonal Belfast – Galway service.

Services between Belfast City and Isle of Man were increased, and through services to Gloucester (Staverton) from Belfast City were launched. The company also operated seasonal services between Isle of Man and Anglesey (Valley) Airport. A service to London Oxford airport was announced, and services began seven days a week starting May 2012 and this service continued through to January 2013. On 22 November 2012, Manx2.com announced a buy-out of its business by Citywing Aviation Services Ltd., a new company formed by a management buyout team. Manx2's last flight took place on 31 December 2012. From 1 January 2013, all flights were taken over by Citywing.

== Destinations ==
- Isle of Man
  - Ronaldsway – Isle of Man Airport (Base and HQ)
- United Kingdom
  - Anglesey – Anglesey Airport
  - Belfast – George Best Belfast City Airport (Base)
  - Blackpool – Blackpool International Airport (Base)
  - Cardiff – Cardiff Airport (Base)
  - Cheltenham, Gloucester – Gloucestershire Airport (Focus City)
  - Leeds/Bradford – Leeds Bradford Airport (suspended from 8 January 2013)
  - Newcastle upon Tyne – Newcastle Airport
  - Oxford – Oxford Airport (suspended from 8 January 2013)
- Jersey
  - Saint Peter – Jersey Airport

== Fleet ==
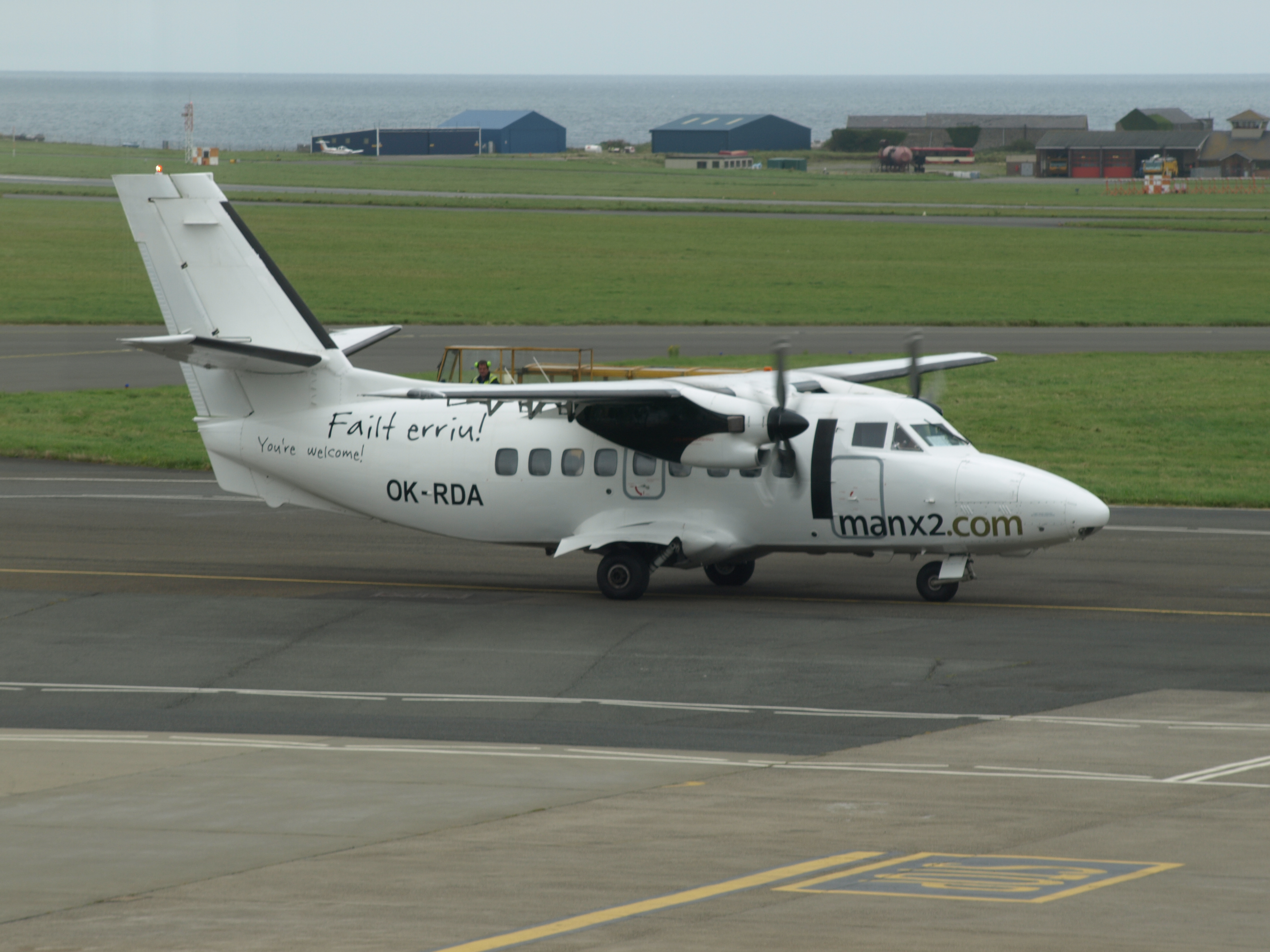
Let L-410 Turbolet at Ronaldsway Airport

The Manx2 business was often referred to as a virtual airline. Manx2 did not own any aircraft directly but by virtue of its branding and advertising, sold tickets on flights operated on its behalf by other airlines, with some painted in the Manx2.com livery. Overall, were used 1 BAe Jetstream 31, 2 Dornier 228-200, 4 Fairchild-Swearingen SA-227 Metroliner III, and 3 Let-410.

== Accidents and incidents ==
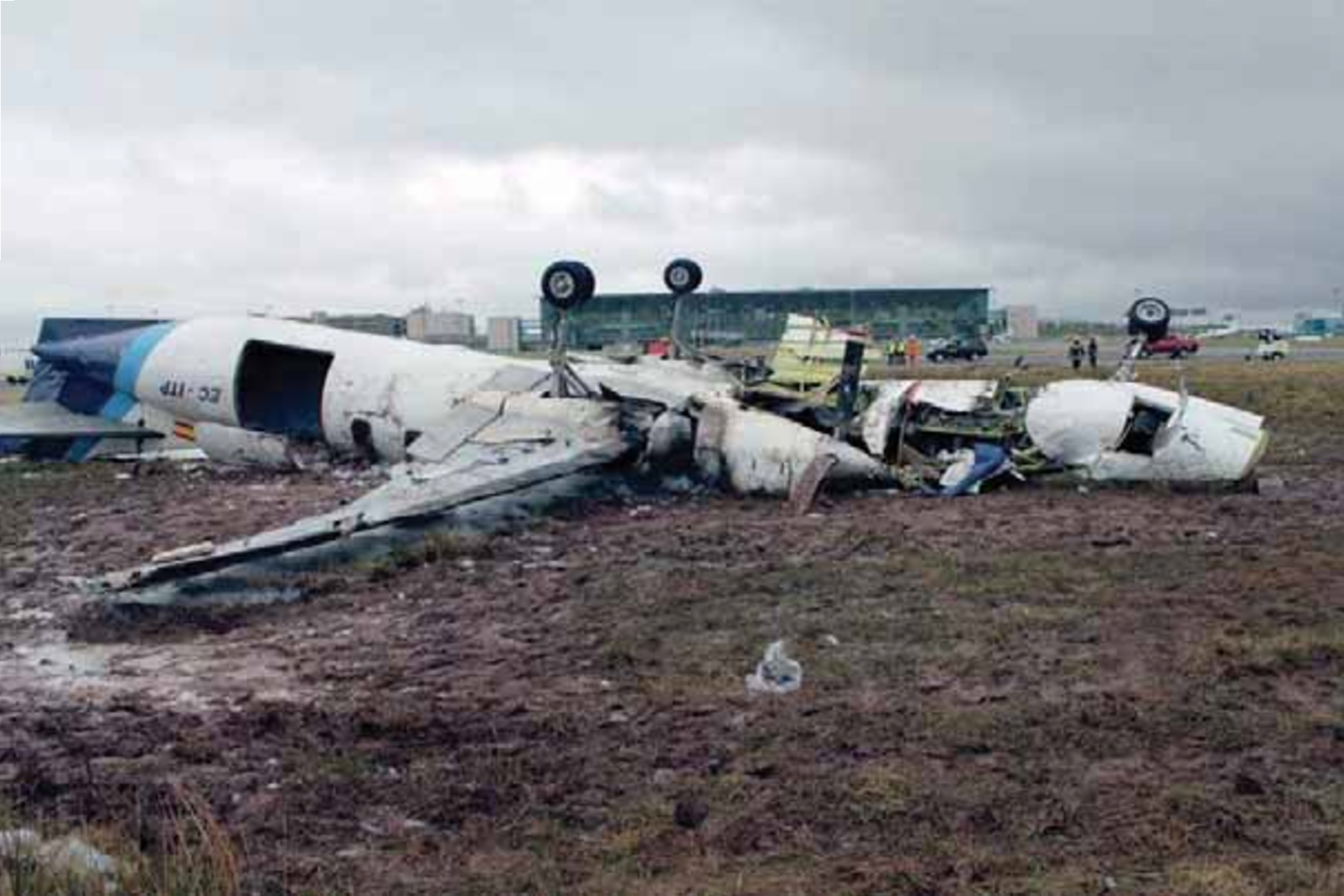
Flight 7100 wreckage

- On 10 February 2011, Manx2 Flight 7100, a Fairchild SA 227-BC Metro III owned by the Spanish airline Air Lada and registered EC-ITP, was operating a scheduled flight under the AOC of Flightline S.L on behalf of Manx2. The flight, NM7100, was operating from Belfast-City to Cork with ten passengers and two crew. At 09:50 hrs, during the third attempt to land at Cork Airport in low visibility conditions, control was lost and the aircraft impacted the runway. The aircraft came to a rest inverted in soft ground to the right of the runway surface. Post impact fires occurred in both engines which were quickly extinguished by the Airport Fire Service (AFS). Six persons, including both pilots, were killed. Four passengers were seriously injured and two received minor injuries.
- On 26 November 2011, a Manx2 Let-410 blew a tyre after a hard landing in gale-force winds at Blackpool airport. The plane skidded along the runway and came close to exiting onto the grass. The plane finally came to a stop at a sideways angle to the runway and all passengers were evacuated safely.
- On 8 March 2012, BAe Jetstream 3102 G-CCPW of Links Air, operating Manx2 Flight 302 from Leeds-Bradford to Ronaldsway veered off the runway on landing at Ronaldsway. The aircraft was substantially damaged when the starboard undercarriage collapsed. There were no injuries amongst the twelve passengers and two crew.

== See also ==
- List of defunct airlines of the United Kingdom
