= OXF =

OXF may refer to:

- Oxford Airport (IATA code OXF) in the county of Oxfordshire, UK
- Oxford railway station (National Rail code OXF) in the county of Oxfordshire, UK
- Oxfordshire (Chapman code OXF), a county in the UK
