= Manx2 Flight 7100 =

2011 aircraft accident in Ireland

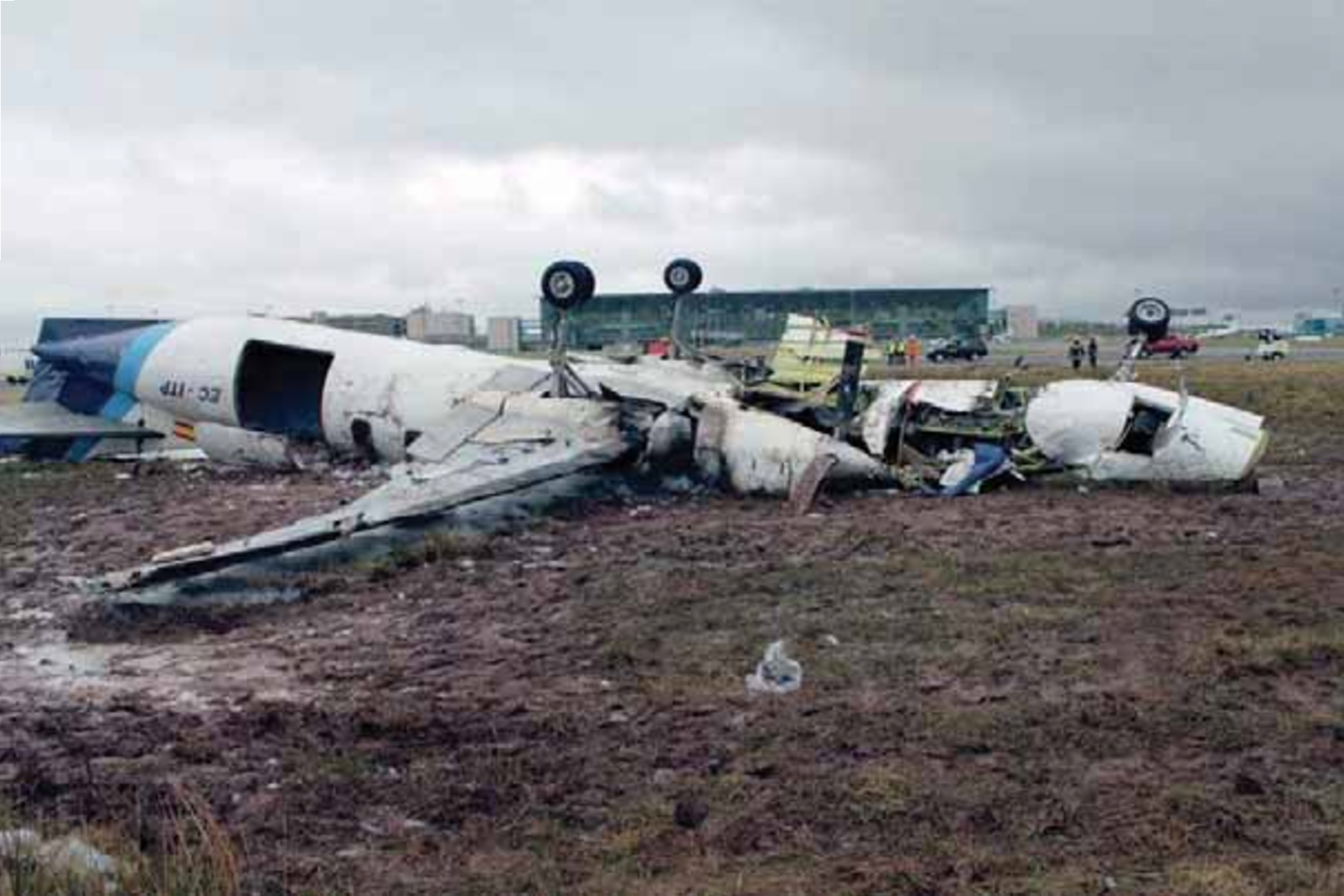
- Wreckage of the aircraft

Accident
- Date: 10 February 2011
- Summary: Crashed following loss of control during go-around
- Site: Cork Airport, Cork, Republic of Ireland; 51°50′52″N 8°29′47″W

Aircraft
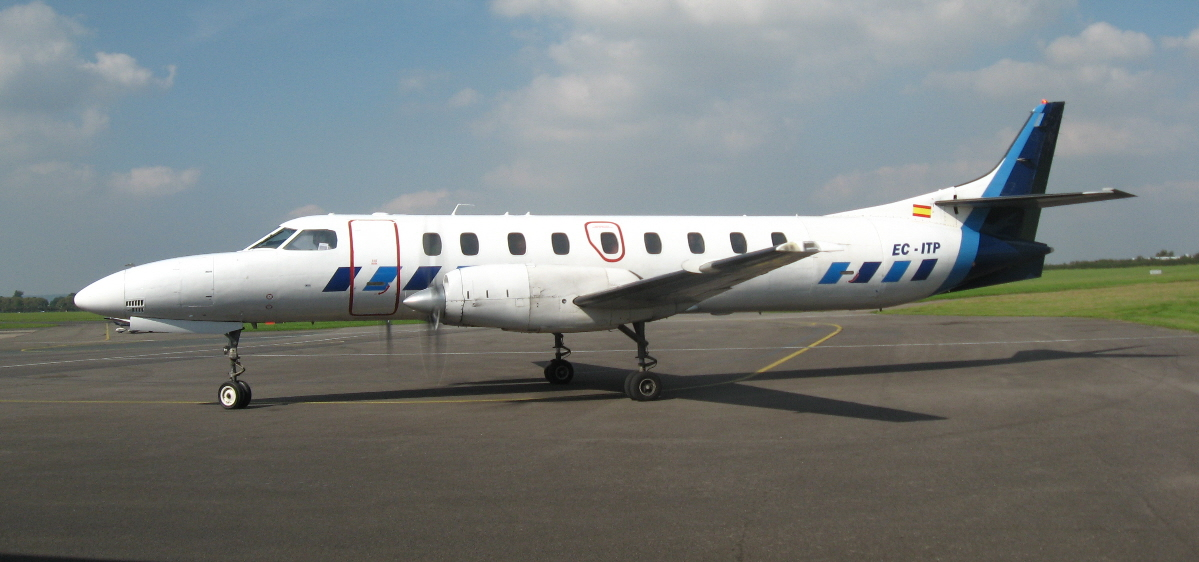
- EC-ITP, the aircraft involved in the accident, pictured in 2008 with a previous livery
- Aircraft type: Fairchild SA 227-BC Metro III
- Operator: Flightline on behalf of Manx2
- IATA flight No.: NM7100
- ICAO flight No.: FLT400C
- Call sign: FLIGHT-AVIA 400 CHARLIE
- Registration: EC-ITP
- Flight origin: George Best Belfast City Airport, Belfast, Northern Ireland, United Kingdom
- Destination: Cork Airport, Cork, Republic of Ireland
- Occupants: 12
- Passengers: 10
- Crew: 2
- Fatalities: 6
- Injuries: 6
- Survivors: 6

Manx2 Flight 7100 was a scheduled commercial flight from Belfast, Northern Ireland, to Cork, Republic of Ireland. On 10 February 2011, the Fairchild Metro III aircraft flying the route with ten passengers and two crew on board crashed on its third attempt to land at Cork Airport in foggy conditions. Six people, including both pilots, died. Six passengers survived but were injured, four of them seriously.

The Air Accident Investigation Unit published its final report in January 2014. It stated that the probable cause of the accident was loss of control during an attempted go-around below decision height in instrument meteorological conditions (IMC). The report mentioned as contributory factors the inappropriate pairing of flight crews, inadequate command training and checking, and inadequate oversight of the charter operation by the operator and the operator's state.

== History of the flight ==
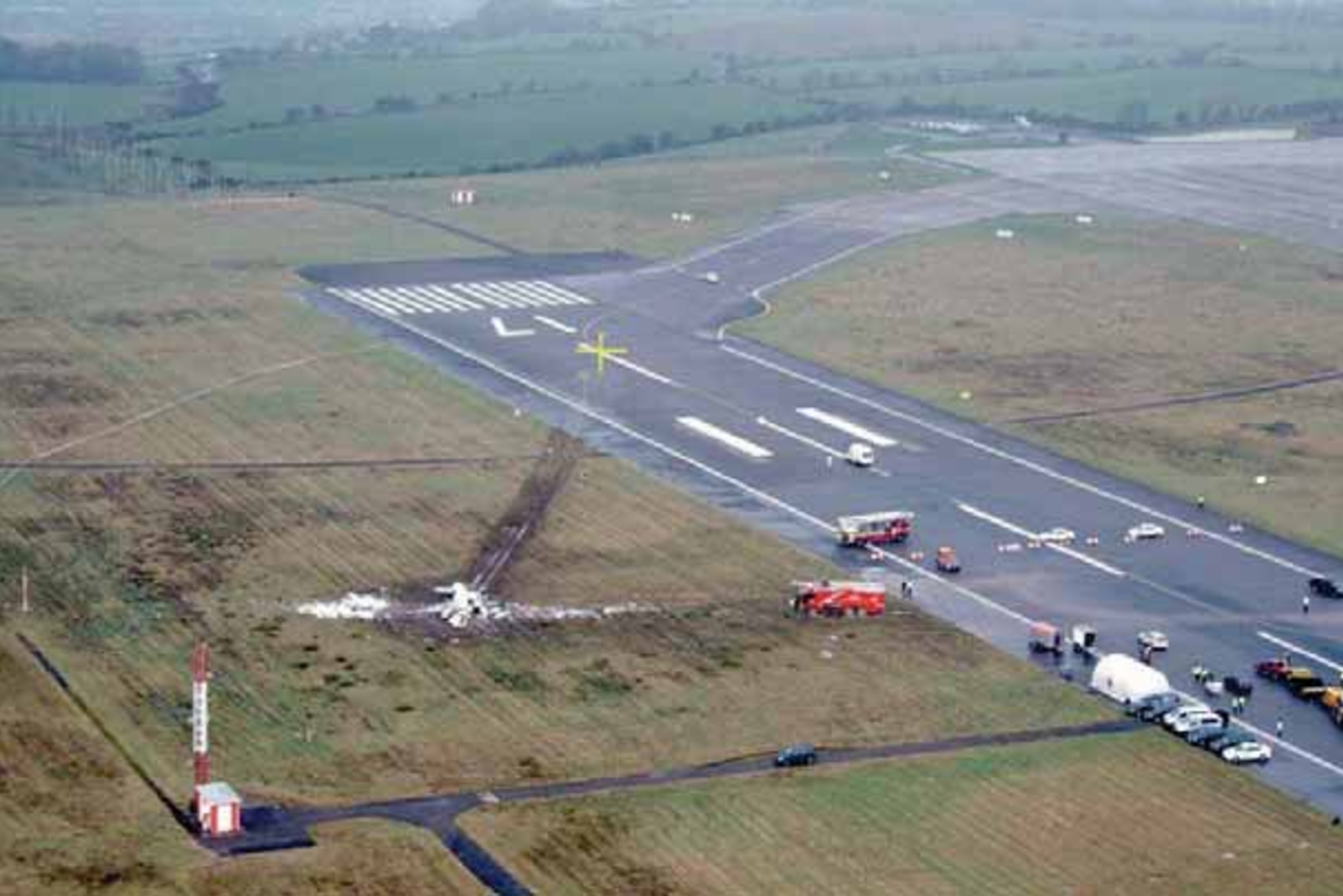
Overview of the accident site, with the point of right wingtip contact with the runway marked with a yellow cross

Flight 7100 was scheduled to depart Belfast City Airport at 07:50 GMT arriving at Cork Airport for 09:00 GMT. On board were a crew of two and ten passengers.

The aircraft arrived at Belfast City Airport at 07:15 after a short positioning flight from Belfast International Airport, and was refuelled for the planned route-trip to Cork and back. The flight specified Waterford Airport as the alternate airport for the sector to Cork. No second alternate was made. Boarding of the flight was delayed due to both crew members working on the passenger seats in the cabin; boarding commenced once that task was completed. Passengers chose their seats at random and the safety demonstration was carried out by the co-pilot.

- 08:10 – Flight 7100 departed and was estimated to arrive in Cork at 09:10, where the weather was foggy.^{[Note 1]}
- 08:34 – The flight crew established communication with Shannon Air Traffic Control.
- 08:48 – The aircraft was handed over to a Cork Approach controller.
- 08:58 – The crew reported established on the ILS for Runway 17 and was handed over to Cork Tower.
- 09:00 – Cork Tower passed on to the crew the instrumented runway visual range (IRVR), which was still below the minimum required.
- 09:03 – The crew descended below the decision height (DH) of 200 feet (61 m) and a missed approach (go-around) was carried out. The lowest recorded height on this approach was 101 feet (31 m).

Radar vectors were given by Cork Approach to the reciprocal runway 35, which the crew believed with the sun behind the aircraft, might make visual acquisition of the runway easier.

- 09:10 – The aircraft was 8 miles (7.0 nmi; 13 km) from touchdown and was handed back to Cork Tower. Again the RVR passed on by Tower were below minimums. The approach continued beyond the Outer Marker (OM).
- 09:14 – The aircraft again descended below the DH and a second missed approach was carried out. The lowest recorded height on this approach was 91 feet (28 m).
- 09:15 – The flight crew entered a holding pattern named ROVAL and maintained an altitude of 3,000 feet (910 m).

In the hold, the flight crew requested weather conditions for Waterford, which were below minimums. The flight crew nominated Shannon Airport as their alternate and requested the latest weather; again the weather there was below minimums. Weather for Dublin was passed on to the flight crew and was also below minimums. Cork Approach informed the flight crew about weather conditions at Kerry Airport, which were "good" with 10-kilometre (6.2 mi; 5.4 nmi) visibility.

- 09:33 – Flight 7100 was still in the ROVAL hold, IRVR for Runway 17 began to improve.
- 09:39 – Following further slight improvement in IRVR values, but with conditions still below minimums, the flight crew elected to carry out a third approach, and the second approach for Runway 17.
- 09:45 – Flight 7100 reported established on the ILS for Runway 17; during this time IRVR improved further to 550 metres (1,800 ft) (the required minimum) which was passed on to the crew by Cork Approach. The flight was handed over to Cork Tower for the third time.
- 09:46 – Cork Tower passed on the latest IRVR of 500/400/400, which were now again below minimums.

The approach was continued beyond the OM, the commander taking over operation of the power levers. Descent was continued below the DH. A significant reduction in power and significant roll to the left followed, just below 100 feet (30 m), and a third go-around was called by the commander, which the co-pilot acknowledged. Coincident with the application of go-around power by the commander, control of the aircraft was lost. The aircraft rolled to the left, and then to the right beyond the vertical, which brought the right wingtip into contact with the runway. The aircraft continued to roll and impacted the runway inverted. The stall warning sounded continuously during the final seven seconds of the CVR recording.

At 09:50:34, following both initial impacts the aircraft continued inverted for a further 189 metres (620 ft; 207 yd) and came to a rest in soft ground to the right of the runway.

Emergency Locator Transmitter (ELT) alarm
Transmission of a distress radiobeacon on 121.5 MHz and 243 MHz

During this time, the Emergency Locator Transmitter (ELT) began to sound in the Control Tower at Cork Airport. Post impact fires ensued in both engines, and from fuel leaking from the outboard right fuel tank. The fires were put out by the Airfield Fire Service (AFS) before they reached the fuselage. Of the twelve on board, six people were fatally injured including both pilots. Four of the survivors suffered serious injuries whilst two received minor injuries and were described as walking wounded. A witness inside the airport terminal building stated that the fog was so thick that the crashed aircraft could not be seen. The airport fire service extinguished both post impact fires within ten minutes of the accident, and started to remove the casualties from the wreckage. The injured were taken to Cork University Hospital for treatment.

== Aircraft and crew ==
The aircraft destroyed in the accident was a twin-turboprop Fairchild SA227-BC Metro III with Spanish registration EC-ITP, c/n BC-789B, It was owned by a Spanish bank and leased to Líneas Aéreas de Andalucía, known as Air Lada, based in Seville, Spain. The aircraft was subleased to Flightline S.L., based in Barcelona, Spain, and was on its air operator's certificate (AOC). Tickets were sold by a company called Manx2, which was based in the Isle of Man. The aircraft was 19 years old at the time of the accident, and it had undergone a maintenance check in the week prior to the accident.

The captain was 31-year-old Jordi Sola Lopez from Barcelona, Spain. The first officer was 27-year-old Andrew John Cantle from Sunderland, England. Both were employed by Air Lada. The captain had logged 1,800 total hours of which 1,600 were on the Fairchild Metro III, but just 25 were as pilot-in-command on the aircraft. The first officer had logged 539 total hours of which 289 were on the aircraft type. Their pairing together on the flight was considered inappropriate and highly unusual due to their shared lack of total experience. Both pilots were certified for Instrument landing system CAT I; neither pilot, however, was certified for CAT II.

Sola Lopez had been promoted to captain on 4 February 2011. His first flight in command of the aircraft took place on 6 February 2011, four days prior to the accident. The captain had flown into Cork 61 times; his logbooks had never shown any diversions.

The first officer had joined another Spanish operator flying the Fairchild Metro III for 270 hours before joining Air Lada. According to the logbooks, he subsequently flew with line captains who were not instructors. He accumulated 19 hours with Air Lada, but he never completed the line check although he had been required to do so.

== Victims ==
The aircraft had a crew of two and ten passengers. Both crew members and four passengers were fatally injured.

| Nationality | Crew | Passengers | Fatalities | Injured |
|---|---|---|---|---|
| British | 1 | 5 | 4 | 2 |
| Irish | 0 | 5 | 1 | 4 |
| Spanish | 1 | 0 | 1 | 0 |
| Total | 2 | 10 | 6 | 6 |

== Investigation ==
The Air Accident Investigation Unit (AAIU) opened an investigation into the accident. Four personnel from the AAIU were on scene within 90 minutes of the accident. They completed their survey of the wreckage that day. The cockpit voice recorder (CVR) and flight data recorder (FDR) were recovered from the wreckage. The data from the FDR was extracted by the AAIU in Dublin, while the CVR was sent to the UK's Air Accident Investigation Branch (AAIB) for download. There were accredited representatives to the team from the United States FAA and NTSB, the Aviation Incidents and Accidents Investigation (AIAI) of Israel (as the "State of Type Certificate Holder"), Spain's Civil Aviation Accident and Incident Investigation Commission and the British AAIB.

The wreckage was transported to the AAIU's examination facility at Gormanston, County Meath, to allow investigators to reconstruct the aircraft as far as possible. The six survivors were interviewed by the AAIU.

A preliminary report, issued in March 2011, stated that the aircraft, being flown by the co-pilot, had deviated from the runway centre-line on final approach and that the crew decided to execute a third go-around four seconds before impact. The aircraft rolled to the left and to the right, and the right wing then impacted the runway.

An interim statement was published in February 2012 in line with European Union regulatory requirements. Inspection of the engines revealed that the right engine had consistently been developing up to five percent more torque than the left engine, as a result of a defective right engine intake air temperature and pressure sensor. The defective sensor meant that as well as delivering more torque than the left engine it would also respond more rapidly to commands to increase power from the engine's power lever than the left engine. The investigation also determined that both engines were developing go-around power at the moment of impact, having both been below flight idle power at eight to six seconds before impact. At eight seconds before impact the right engine reached a minimum of zero torque while the left engine reached −9 percent torque (which means the left propeller was driving the engine instead of the engine driving the propeller). The stall warning horn also sounded repeatedly in the seven seconds prior to impact.

=== Final report ===
The AAIU released its final report on the accident in January 2014. The probable cause was stated as loss of control during an attempted go-around below decision height in instrument meteorological conditions.

The final report included 54 findings, found 9 contributing factors, and made 11 safety recommendations.

==== Operation of the accident aircraft ====
Manx2's Belfast-Cork route was operated on the air operator's certificate (AOC) of Flightline. As such, Flightline was responsible for controlling all operational matters relating to that service. In practice many day-to-day decisions were taken by Manx2 in its Isle of Man office. One such decision was the pairing of Lopez and Cantle to crew flight 7100 on 10 February. Correct adherence to European aviation regulations (EU-OPS) by the AOC-holder should have prevented this inappropriate pairing of a newly promoted captain with a relatively inexperienced first officer. It had come about because Cantle was drafted in to replace the pilot who was originally rostered as first officer for the flight when he became unavailable. Flightline was not aware of the change in personnel.

==== Issues with the operator's state ====
The investigation highlighted the lack of review by the AOC issuer, Spanish aviation authority Agencia Estatal de Seguridad Aérea (AESA), when in 2010 Flightline were granted a variation to their initially issued AOC to add two Metro III aircraft. AESA stated that "it did not feel it was within its remit to look for additional organisational and financial information to ensure that the Operator was adequately resourced to operate two additional aircraft." However, it was noted that AESA had been aware that the two aircraft added to the AOC had previously been operated from an Isle of Man base for the same ticket seller under a Spanish AOC held by a Company called Eurocontinental Air, which they had suspended because of "problems that arose in that operation" and following "an extended ramp inspection" at the Isle of Man. It was noted that AESA had advised the investigation that it:

- Had no knowledge of the owner, which was a commercial company and therefore not within its regulatory remit.
- Was unaware of the connection between the ticket seller and the owner.
- Was unaware that two former Eurocontinental Air pilots had moved with the aircraft to the operator.
- Was unaware of the remote operation of the Metro III aircraft following their addition to the operator’s AOC in 2010 and that had it known this, it would have taken a greater interest.

The investigation therefore expressed its concern that "the regulatory authority of the State of the Operator did not identify the Operator’s shortcomings, thereby contributing to the cause of the accident." It noted that, since the UK and Irish regulators were expressly prohibited by Regulation (EC) 1008/2008 from exercising any regulatory function in respect of the operation of aircraft from other Member States within and between their territories, both were obliged to rely on the oversight of Spain "to ensure compliance in regulatory matters". It was concluded that in practice "the evidence shows that such oversight was of limited scope and low effectiveness." In this situation, the only control on safety standards was observed to have been the SAFA programme of ramp checks which in this case had not identified the extent of systemic shortcomings. However, it was accepted by the Investigation that "SAFA inspections are limited ... in what can be achieved in the protection of the aviation system". It was also noted that AESA oversight of the operation required by Regulation (EC) 1008/2008 required that member states issuing an AOC must also take responsibility for the corresponding operating licence. It was concluded that "there was no evidence of any such oversight being conducted by Spain", although noted that "the Regulation makes no provision nor provides procedures of how oversight should be conducted, in particular where operations are carried out from a base outside a Member State" (in this case the Isle of Man). Finally, the investigation noted the involvement of the EU Air Safety Committee in relation to the accident operator in the months following the investigated accident and considered that the scope of its remit might usefully be widened "as part of the EU aviation safety net".

==== Loss of control ====
The technical log for the flight indicated that the co-pilot was pilot flying (PF) for the flight. The CVR and ATC recordings also indicate that the co-pilot was PF during the flight. Furthermore, injuries sustained by the co-pilot to his right hand are consistent with his having been handling the aircraft at the time of impact. As no autopilot or flight director was fitted, the PF was under a high workload throughout the flight. This was especially so as three approaches were made in poor weather to below minima with two go-arounds. Normally the PF handles both flight and engine controls in a coordinated manner to achieve the required flight path; the pilot not flying (PNF) carries out other tasks including monitoring the aircraft's flight path, radio communications and keeping the flight log. The CVR indicates that the commander (PNF) took control of the power levers during final approach, this action being acknowledged by the PF. This was significant, as both power levers were subsequently retarded below flight idle – an action which would have been unexpected by the PF.

The recorded data shows that the No. 1 engine reached a minimum torque level of −9% in Beta range, while No. 2 engine reached a minimum of 0%. This thrust asymmetry was coincident with the aircraft commencing a roll to the left (maximum recorded value of 40 degrees bank). It is possible that the PF may have made a control wheel input to the right in response to the unanticipated left roll. However, without FDR parameters of control wheel or control surface position, the investigators could not determine if such an input was made. The subsequent application of power to commence the go-around, at approximately 100 feet, coincided with the commencement of a rapid roll to the right and loss of control. The roll continued through the vertical, the right wingtip struck the runway and the aircraft inverted.

Three principal factors contributed to the loss of control:

- Uncoordinated operation of the power levers and the flight controls, which were being operated by different flight crew members.
- The retardation of the power levers below Flight Idle, an action prohibited in flight, and the subsequent application of power are likely to have induced an uncontrollable roll rate due to asymmetric thrust and drag.
- A torque split between the powerplants, caused by a defective Pt2/Tt2 sensor, became significant when the power levers were retarded below flight idle and the No. 1 powerplant entered negative torque regime. Subsequently, when the power levers were rapidly advanced during the attempted go-around, this probably further contributed to the roll behaviour as recorded on the FDR.

==== Contributing factors ====
The report stated that they were:

1. "Continuation of approach beyond the outer marker equivalent position without the required minima.
2. Continuation of descent below decision altitude without adequate visual reference.
3. Uncoordinated operation of the power levers and the flight controls.
4. In-flight operation of the power levers below flight idle.
5. A torque split between the engines that became significant when the power levers were operated below flight idle.
6. Tiredness and fatigue on the part of the flight crew members.
7. Inadequate command training and checking during the command upgrade of the commander.
8. Inappropriate pairing of flight crew members.
9. Inadequate oversight by the operator and the state of the operator."

==== Safety recommendations ====
The report contained eleven safety recommendations. It called for the Directorate-General for Mobility and Transport (DG MOVE) of the European Commission and for the European Aviation Safety Agency (EASA) to review the enforcement of flight time limitations for flight crews, to issue guidance on successive instrument approaches in IMC resulting in a go-around, to review the syllabus for the appointment to aircraft commander, to restrict ticket sellers from exercising operation control of air carriers, to ensure that the granting of AOC variations remains within the competence of the air carrier, to improve safety oversight and the efficacy of ramp inspections, and to review the scope of DG MOVE's Air Safety Committee.

AOC-holder Flightline was recommended to review its operational policy of an immediate diversion following an aborted landing due to weather, and to implement suitable training for personnel responsible for flight safety and accident prevention. Spanish aviation authority AESA was recommended to review its oversight of air carriers, in particular those conducting remote operations.

== Aftermath ==
The crash led to the closure of the airport for more than 24 hours and the diversion of all flights. As a result of the accident, Manx2 terminated its contract with Flightline and suspended its Belfast City – Cork route.

Martin McGuinness, the then deputy First Minister of Northern Ireland, revealed that he had intended to be on the flight, but had changed his travel plans. McGuinness was due to travel to Cork to campaign in the forthcoming Irish general election, scheduled for 25 February.

In March 2011, EASA initiated a procedure to suspend the AOC of Flightline Eventually the AOC was not revoked, but restrictions were put in place banning Flightline from operating Fairchild Metro IIIs.

In April 2011, pilot Oliver Lee, who had formerly flown Manx2 services between Belfast City and Cork, committed suicide. He had left the airline days before the accident to join British airline Jet2.com and was known by frequent travellers on the route. Lee reportedly felt a sense of guilt following the accident.

The preliminary investigation report stated that the crew breached air safety regulations on all three approaches by descending below the decision height of 200 ft (61 m) before initiating a missed approach.

In December 2012, Manx2 ceased operations and the company was liquidated. In January 2013, as a result of a management buyout, the assets of the company and the whole management team transferred to its successor, Citywing. Citywing subsequently ceased all operations in March 2017.

Following the release of the final report, family members of those bereaved in the accident as well as those injured announced intentions to pursue legal action against all three companies involved in the accident. An inquest was held in June 2014, in which a jury returned verdicts of accidental death on all six victims.

On 9 February 2015, the accident was featured in the episode "No Clear Options/Third Time Unlucky" of Mayday, which was known as Air Crash Investigation in UK, Australia, South Africa, and Asia, and Air Disasters in the United States. The investigative team of the incident declined to co-operate with the program makers out of respect for the survivors and victims' families, although one of the investigators did appear in the programme. In February 2017, it was featured in the installment titled "No Clear Options," installment 9 in Season 8 of Air Disasters, which was transmitted on the Smithsonian Institution's basic-cable Smithsonian Channel.

== See also ==
- Crew resource management

== Notes ==
1. The METAR in force at the time of the accident was: EICK 100930Z 08005KT 050V110 0300 R17/0375N R35/0350N FG BKN001 04/04 Q1010 NOSIG.

Translation: METAR for Cork Airport, issued on the 10th of the month at 09:30 Zulu time. Wind from 080° at 5 knots (9.3 km/h; 5.8 mph), varying from 050° to 110°. Visibility 300 metres (980 ft), Runway visual range for Runway 17 is 375 metres (1,230 ft) with no significant change, Runway visual range for Runway 35 is 350 metres (1,150 ft) with no significant change, fog, broken clouds at 100 feet (30 m) above ground level, temperature 4 °C, dew point 4 °C, QNH 1010 hPa, no significant change expected.
