= AirMed =

Air Medical Ltd
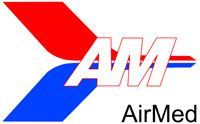
IATA	ICAO	Call sign
-	MCD	AIRMED
- Founded: 1985
- Fleet size: 9
- Destinations: international
- Headquarters: London Oxford Airport, UK

Air Medical Ltd, or AirMed was a fixed-wing UK based air ambulance specialist and commercial aircraft operator based in Hangar 8 at London Oxford Airport.

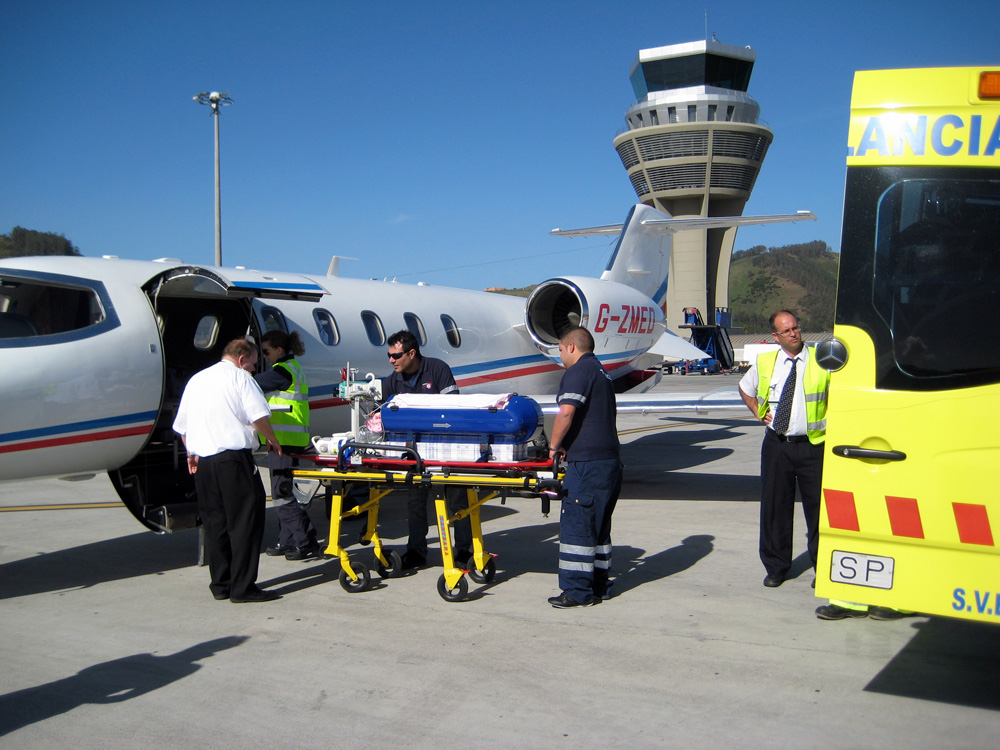
Learjet 35A undertaking an air ambulance neonatal transfer

== History ==
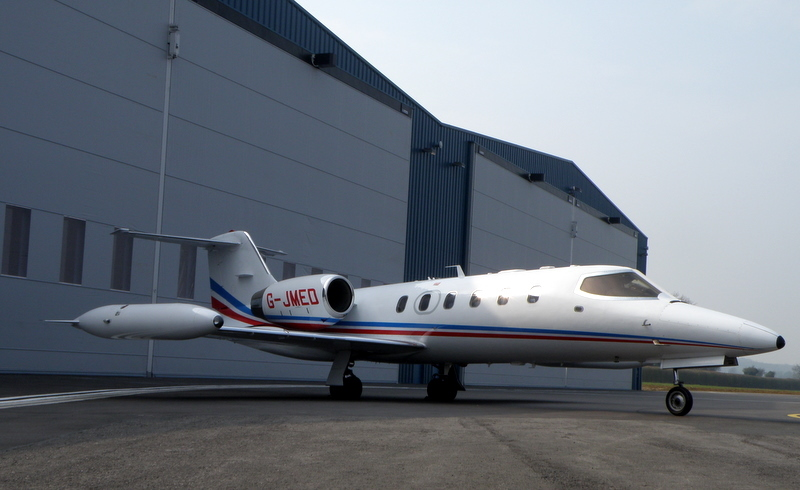
Bombardier Learjet 35A Serial no.671

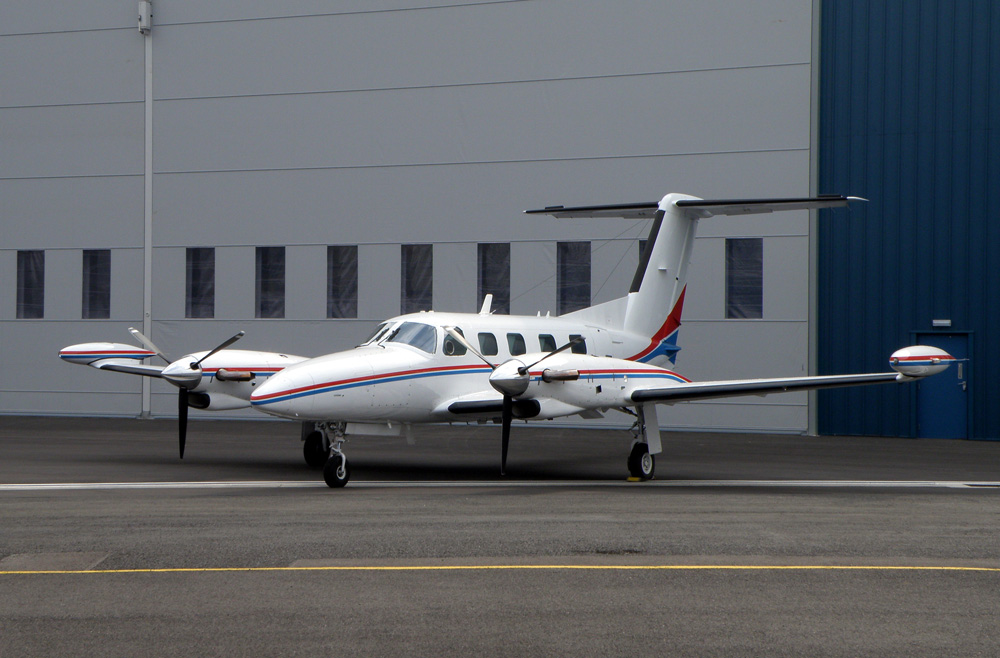
Piper Cheyenne IIIA PA42-720

AirMed was a family-own limited company, set up in 1985 by Rod Paris. The company originally carried out a wide variety of air charter including passenger, freight and air ambulance as well as organ transplantation work and aerial photography. In the earlier years the number of flights completed each year was anywhere between 500 and 1,000, however the split of work was approximately 50% air ambulance and 50% passenger/freight.

The company was bought out in 2003 by the Topliss and Dent families. Since then over $12 million was invested in new aircraft, medical equipment and personnel. During this time the aircraft fleet changed and the capabilities of the company increased considerably. AirMed specialised almost entirely in air ambulance and MEDEVAC work and a large part of its revenues was generated by patient transfers. AirMed operated across the globe and covered medical specialties like neonatal, obstetrics and paediatric. They were awarded EURAMI Special Care Accreditation in November 2010 and were fully registered with the Care Quality Commission in England.

AirMed Engineering first gained approval in 2002, and became EASA Part 145 Part M approved. It was also a Cessna Authorised Service Facility and Parts Supplier. AirMed Engineering became a maintenance organisation specialising in Cessna Caravan C208 as well as Piper, Lycoming, Honeywell and Pratt & Whitney.

On 1 February 2016, AirMed went into administration, with the aircraft sold to new owners, principally in Germany.

== Aircraft fleet ==
AirMed operated a fleet of four aircraft:

- 2 Bombardier Learjet 35A
- 2 Piper Cheyenne IIIA

== Affiliations ==
AirMed held 'Special Care' accreditation from the European Aero-Medical Institute. AirMed were registered with England's Care Quality Commission (CQC) as a private ambulance provider. The medical team that worked on board the aircraft included clinicians at the Oxford University Hospitals NHS Foundation Trust specialising in anaesthetics, neonatology, paediatrics, cardiology and intensive care.
