= Martin Halstead =

British pilot and former entrepreneur (born 1986/1987)

- Born: 1986/1987
- Education: Abingdon School; D'Overbroeck's College

Martin Richard Alexander Halstead (born 1986 or 1987) is a pilot and former entrepreneur who founded two short-lived aviation businesses.

== Biography ==
His secondary education was at Abingdon School and D'Overbroeck's College. After a spell at Oxford Aviation Training, since early 2008 rebranded as Oxford Aviation Academy, Halstead decided to set up his own airline and focus on managing an aviation business.

== Alpha One Airways ==
Halstead first attracted media attention in the UK in March 2005 when, at the age of 18, he announced the launch of Alpha One Airways. Alpha One Airways never applied for an Air Operator's Certificate. Instead, Halstead planned to subcontract the operation of flights to another carrier.

Alpha One Airways was due to launch its commercial services on the route linking Oxford and Cambridge with flights starting on 18 April 2005. Alpha One never operated any services on the route, although from 1 February 2006 another small airline, Sky Commuter, for a few weeks had scheduled flights linking the two university cities.

After several changes of focus and false starts, the company eventually operated a route between the Isle of Man and Edinburgh using Piper Chieftain aircraft. In January 2006 it suspended operations having carried fewer than a hundred passengers. Alpha One Airways was supposedly going to refocus its operations, but nothing further came of the venture.

== After Alpha One Airways ==
In an interview with The Oxford Times in October 2006, Halstead reflected on the Alpha One experience. The newspaper reported that Halstead was working again, this time at a music shop in Oxford city centre. Halstead became a director of the company which owned the shop.

== Varsity Express ==
In January 2010 Halstead set up a new aviation venture called Varsity Express.

The new company started services between Oxford and Edinburgh on 1 March 2010, and suspended operations one week later, after a take over by the aircraft leaser, LinksAir, fell through. Mr Halstead stated that he lost £3,500 of his own money in the venture.

== See also ==
- Varsity Express
