= Varsity Express =

Varsity Air Services
IATA	ICAO	Call sign
-	-	-
- Founded: 2 January 2010
- Commenced operations: 1 March 2010
- Ceased operations: 8 March 2010
- Operating bases: London Oxford Airport
- Fleet size: 1
- Destinations: 2
- Headquarters: Canary Wharf, London
- Key people: Martin Halstead (Founder & MD
- Website: http://flyvarsity.com

Varsity Air Services Ltd. - trading as Varsity Express - was a regional airline based at London Oxford Airport in England. It was never a licensed airline, instead it sold tickets on flights operated by Links Air on its behalf. Varsity operated only 11 scheduled flights over the space of one week in March 2010.

== History ==
=== A failure from the start ===
The airline first became public on 20 January 2010 after having been reportedly incorporated on day 2. Press releases arranged by a British aviation PR company called Emerald Media announced that Varsity Express would launch an air service between Edinburgh and Oxford in March 2010. From the outset, Varsity Express embraced social networking and microblogging media, using Twitter and Facebook to reach out to its potential clientele in the university cities where it planned to operate. Even before its maiden flight, the company announced new routes linking Newcastle-upon-Tyne with both Edinburgh and Oxford.

The company was set up and managed by Martin Halstead. Halstead had secured some publicity in 2005 when, at the age of 18, he announced that he would launch his own aviation business. Halstead's 2005 business was called AlphaOne Airways. It had a number of false starts. Halstead announced services from Oxford in March 2005 and later the same year from Southampton Airport. AlphaOne Airways never flew a single flight from either airport. In December 2005 and January 2006, a limited flight programme took place between Isle of Man and Edinburgh. The business folded after having carried only 46 passengers.

Halstead's personality-based PR had underpinned AlphaOne Airways, but the venture was underfunded. Because AlphaOne did not have the necessary certification to operate flights itself, Halstead arranged for a licensed carrier to fly on his behalf. He followed the same strategy with Varsity Express, but claimed he had a sounder funding base.

=== Same mistakes, same conclusion ===
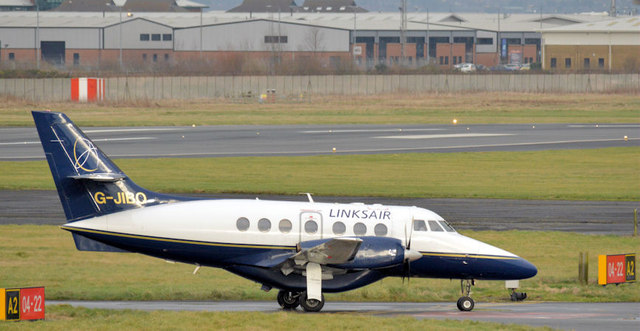
BAe Jetstream 31 which Links Air operated on Varsity behalf

The airline started operations on 1 March 2010 with flight LNQ601 (operated by Links Air) leaving Oxford Airport shortly after 0800 local time, touching down in Edinburgh at 9.42 am. Such operations ceased just one week later.

On the afternoon of 8 March 2010, Varsity Express suspended operations after Links Air, the company which owned the BAe Jetstream 31, refused to continue supporting the venture. A take over of operations by Linksair had collapsed earlier in the day. Thirteen passengers were left stranded because the second leg of their return tickets was not honoured.

== Operator status ==
Varsity Express did not have an Air Operator's Certificate (AOC), so the company's flights were operated by Humberside Airport based Links Air using a single Jetstream 31 aircraft. Varsity Express (like AlphaOne Airways before it) was thus an extreme example of what transport economists often term a virtual airline. It even outsourced its core flying operations. Because it neither possessed, nor had it applied for, an Air Operator's Certification from the Civil Aviation Authority (United Kingdom), Varsity Express was never subject to the regulatory scrutiny (with respect to financial backing and the sustainability of the proposed operation) that would have applied to a start-up carrier seeking to secure its own Air Operator's Certificate.

== Fleet ==
- 1 leased BAe Jetstream 31

== See also ==
- List of defunct airlines of the United Kingdom
