= Links Air =

British airline

IATA	ICAO	Call sign
W2	LNQ	FASTLINK
- Founded: 9 August 1983
- Commenced operations: April 2014
- Ceased operations: 22 January 2016
- Operating bases: Doncaster (HQ); Cardiff (Base)
- Headquarters: Doncaster Sheffield Airport, Finningley, United Kingdom
- Key people: Jonathan Gordon Roy Ibbotson
- Website: linksair.co.uk

Links Air was a British airline operating scheduled regional flights as well as charter services. It formerly operated scheduled flights out of Doncaster Sheffield Airport and public service obligation flights in Wales from Cardiff to Anglesey on behalf of the Welsh Government.

== History ==
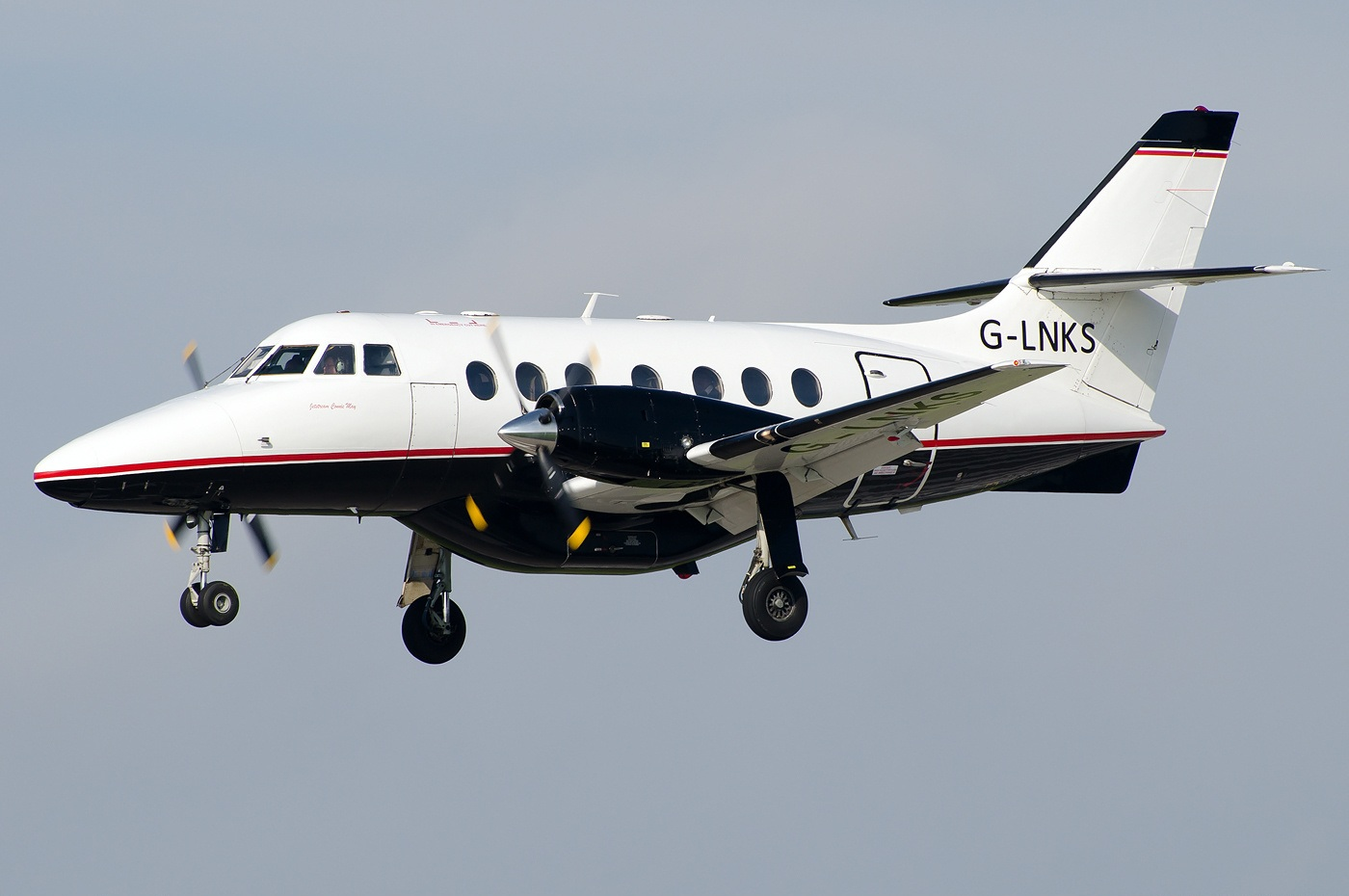
BAe Jetstream 31

The airline was founded by Jon Ibbotson who took over Love Air assets in 2007. It began operating scheduled flights in April 2014 under its own name, after previously operating on behalf of Varsity Express and Citywing. For 2015, Norwich was added as a destination from Cardiff before being dropped after less than two months, while Belfast flights were cancelled and Isle of Man flights ceased operating on Sunday 14 June.

Until October 2015, the airline held a Type B operating licence issued by the UK Civil Aviation Authority (CAA), authorising to operate flights with fewer than 20 passengers and/or weighing less than 10 tonnes, which were operated by its three British Aerospace Jetstream 31 aircraft.

On 21 October 2015 the CAA suspended the airline's operating certificate (AOC) over safety concerns, stating that, "Safety is always our first priority and we will always take action when necessary to protect the travelling public." The Cardiff-Anglesey route was taken over by North Flying on behalf of Links Air on short notice The route has since been operated by Van Air Europe and DragonFly Executive Air Charter, before returning to North Flying. Links Air withdrew its service without notice on 22 January 2016, The service was later run by Citywing. Links Air was liquidated on 1 April 2016.

== Accidents and incidents ==
- On 8 March 2012, a BAe Jetstream 31 of Links Air, operating Manx2 Flight 302 from Leeds-Bradford Airport, United Kingdom to Ronaldsway Airport, Isle of Man, departed the runway on landing at Ronaldsway. The aircraft was substantially damaged when the starboard undercarriage collapsed due to corrosion-induced cracking. There were no injuries amongst the twelve passengers and two crew.
- On 15 August 2014, the aircraft involved in the 2012 accident was damaged at Doncaster-Sheffield airport on a flight from Belfast following the failure of the port undercarriage. One passenger was taken to hospital for treatment and the airport was closed until the next day.

== See also ==
- List of defunct airlines of the United Kingdom
