= Anglesey Airport =

Closed airport in Anglesey, Wales

Anglesey Airport Maes Awyr Môn

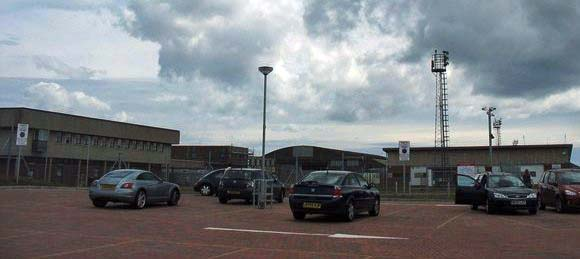
- IATA: VLY; ICAO: EGOV

Summary
- Airport type: Military/Public
- Operator: Bilfinger Europa Facility Management Limited
- Serves: Anglesey; Gwynedd
- Location: Llanfair yn Neubwll, Isle of Anglesey
- Opened: May 2007
- Closed: By May 2024
- Passenger services ceased: March 2020
- Elevation AMSL: 37 ft / 11 m
- Coordinates: 53°14′53″N 004°32′07″W

Map
- Location of airport in Anglesey

Runways
Direction	Length		Surface
Direction	m	ft	Surface
01/19	1,639	5,377	Asphalt
13/31	2,290	7,513	Asphalt
- Source: UK MIL AIP

Anglesey Airport (Welsh: Maes Awyr Môn) (IATA: VLY, ICAO: EGOV) is a disused airport situated at Llanfair-yn-Neubwll in Anglesey, Wales. The airport is owned by the Isle of Anglesey County Council on land leased from the Defence Infrastructure Organisation. The leased site is part of RAF Valley.

== History ==
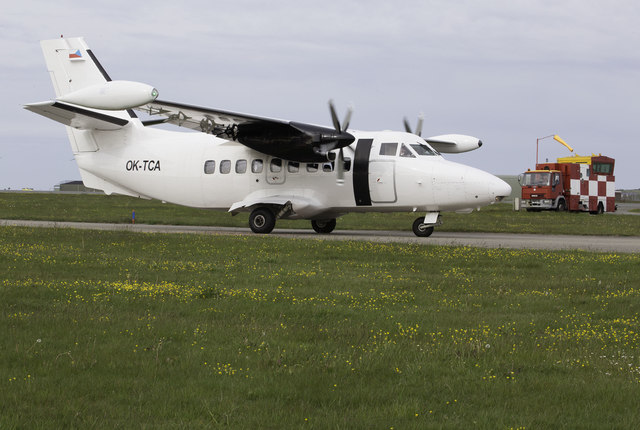
A Let L-410 at Anglesey Airport in 2016, operating the Anglesey–Cardiff route for Citywing

Plans put forward in early 2006 by the National Assembly for Wales (now the Senedd) led to a subsidised weekday air service between the airport and Cardiff Airport, 12 miles west of the Welsh capital, in the hope of improving the economy of Anglesey and North Wales in general. A twice daily service began in May 2007, with a journey time of around one hour. The route was variously operated by Links Air, Citywing, and Eastern Airways (on behalf of Flybe). The route was suspended in March 2020 following the onset of the COVID-19 pandemic. In June 2022, the Welsh Government announced that it would no longer subsidise the route, and service was withdrawn permanently.

The passenger terminal is a single storey building consisting of a check-in desk, departure lounge and baggage handling areas as well as other visitor information areas. The terminal, completed in 2007, was designed by MAP architects and cost £1,000,000. The publicly funded building contract was given to the construction company Yorkon. The building was built off site and brought to the airport when finished.

When operational, the airport's principal stakeholders were RAF Valley, the Welsh Government, the Isle of Anglesey County Council and Cardiff Airport. The airport was contract managed and operated by Bilfinger Europa Facility Management Limited, a UK subsidiary of Bilfinger, a publicly quoted enterprise on the German stock exchange.

In May 2024, in response to a freedom of information request, Isle of Anglesey County Council stated that the airport had closed.

== Statistics ==
Passenger numbers for flights to Cardiff from Anglesey Airport
Year	Destination	Passengers handled	Percentage Change
2007	Cardiff	8,553	Airport Opens
2008	Cardiff	13,471	▲58%
2009	Cardiff	11,846	▼12%
2010	Cardiff	7,816	▼34%
2011	Cardiff	9,605	▲13%
2012	Cardiff	8,594	▼11%
2013	Cardiff	8,540	▼ <1%
2014	Cardiff	8,786	▲3%
2015	Cardiff	10,860	▲24%
2016	Cardiff	9,187	▼15%
2017	Cardiff	13,045	▲42%
2018	Cardiff	14,629	▲12%
2019	Cardiff	13,593	▼7%
2020	Cardiff	34	▼100%

^{Source: UK Civil Aviation Authority}

== Accidents and incidents ==
In March 2018, flights between Anglesey Airport and Cardiff Airport were suspended due to a fatal crash of a Hawk aircraft from the Red Arrows. Domestic flights were being diverted to Hawarden Airport in Flintshire with coaches transporting passengers between Valley and Hawarden.

== Ground transport ==
The airport is located less than two miles from the A55 North Wales Expressway linking Holyhead and Chester. The airport has a car park for passengers on the airport's former scheduled flights to Cardiff. The nearest railway station is Valley. Arriva Bus services link the airport to both Valley and Holyhead.
