= Oxford Airport =

Airport in Oxfordshire, England

London Oxford Airport Oxford Airport

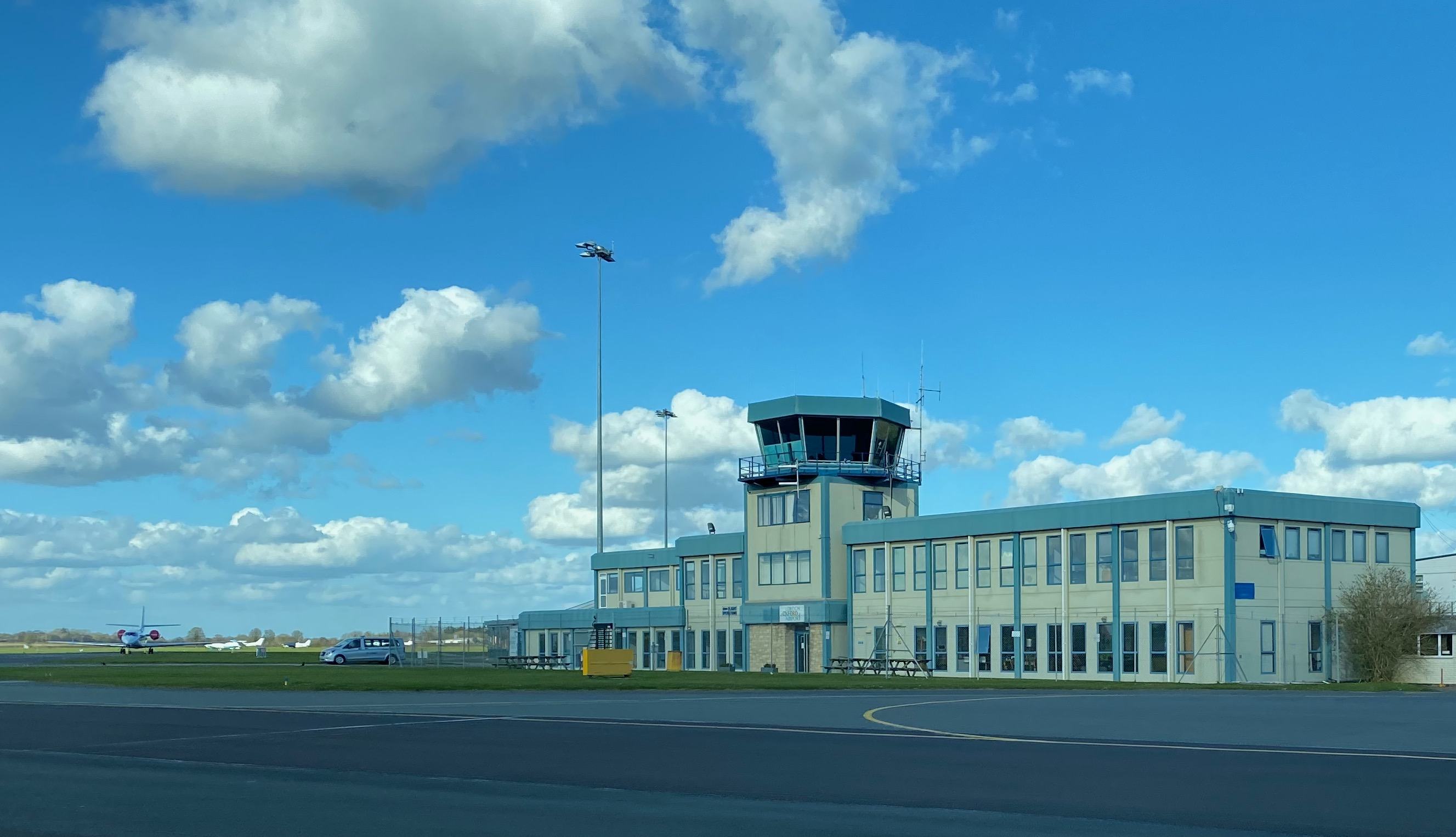
- IATA: OXF; ICAO: EGTK

Summary
- Airport type: Private-owned, public-use
- Owner/Operator: Oxford Aviation Services Limited / OxfordJet
- Serves: Oxford
- Location: Kidlington, Oxfordshire, England
- Elevation AMSL: 270 ft / 82 m
- Coordinates: 51°50′13″N 001°19′12″W
- Website: oxfordairport.co.uk

Maps
- Location in Oxfordshire
- Zoomable map of airport and environs

Runways
Direction	Length		Surface
Direction	m	ft	Surface
01/19	1,552	5,092	Asphalt

Statistics (2022)
- Movements: 72,978
- Sources: UK AIP at NATS

London Oxford Airport (IATA: OXF, ICAO: EGTK), formerly known as Kidlington Airport, is an operational general aviation airport located near Kidlington in Cherwell District, Oxfordshire, England. It is 6 NM (11 km; 6.9 mi) northwest by north of Oxford and 62 mi (100 km) from Central London. Despite its name the airport is not included in the IATA code LON used for London airports.

It specialises in general and business aviation and is home to Leading Edge Aviation, CAE Oxford, formerly Oxford Aviation Training, Volare Aviation and Fly-LSA/LS Airmotive. It also has the UK headquarters of Airbus Helicopters. It is the only ICAO-listed civilian airport in Oxfordshire. Historically dominated by pilot training, in 2008, flying activity fell to just 48,000 movements, the lowest level on record and a 70% decline in 10 years, however, growth in business aviation was the fastest of any UK airport for the years up to 2012. After the COVID-19 pandemic the airport saw an increase in movements, totalling 65,265, over 20,000 more than 2019.

London Oxford Airport is an EASA Certified Airport that allows flights for the public transport of passengers or for flying instruction as authorised by the Certificate Holder (Oxford Aviation Services Limited).

== History ==
The site was originally purchased in 1935 by Oxford City Council to act as municipal airport, and it became operational in June 1938 with a formal inauguration in July 1939. During World War II it was use by the Royal Air Force as RAF Kidlington.

The following units were here at some point:

- No. 52 Squadron RAF
- No. 167 Squadron RAF
- No. 239 Squadron RAF
- No. 411 Squadron RCAF

Units

- No. 1 Air Crew Holding Unit RAF
- No. 3 Maintenance Unit RAF
- No. 4 Glider Training School RAF
- No. 5 Glider Training School RAF
- No. 6 Service Flying Training School RAF
- No. 15 Service Flying Training School RAF
- No. 20 (Pilots) Advanced Flying Unit RAF
- No. 26 Elementary and Reserve Flying Training School RAF
- No. 96 Maintenance Unit RAF
- No. 101 (Glider) Operational Training Unit RAF
- No. 102 (Glider) OTU RAF
- No. 265 Maintenance Unit RAF
- No. 2792 Squadron RAF Regiment

HQ No. 42 (Maintenance) Group RAF, responsible for ammunition and fuel supply, moved to Kidlington on 18 March 1946. It was disbanded into No. 40 Group RAF on 2 January 1956 with its headquarters still at RAF Kidlington.

After World War II, Kidlington became established as a centre for aviation education, charter and maintenance facilities.

By 1968, it had become the second busiest airfield in the UK, with 223,270 movements – just 10% fewer than Heathrow. For 5 years just after World War II (1951–1956) Kidlington was base of operations for the Oxford Gliding Club. They later moved due to an increase of powered aircraft activity. They relocated to RAF Weston-On-The-Green.

In 1981, the airport freehold was sold by the council and later owned by BBA Aviation plc. In July 2007 the airport was sold for £40m to property entrepreneurs David and Simon Reuben.

A new Saturday-only summer service to Jersey, operated by Air Southwest, ran from July to September 2009. The summer service came back in 2010, operated by CityJet.

In August 2009 the airport was rebranded as London Oxford Airport despite its distance from the capital. The move attracted much press comment, and criticism from the Oxford Civic Society, which described the new name as misleading; the airport is 60 miles (97 km) from Marble Arch in central London and generally considered to be well outside the London area. However, it was argued that highlighting proximity to London would make the airport more attractive to the overseas business aviation community, and the airport, as of 2016, hosts the fourth busiest business aviation handling facility (FBO) in the UK.

In October 2009, London Oxford Airport was approved as a UK entry point for pets, under the Pet Travel Scheme (PETS). It was one of only two UK business aviation centres to offer this service at the time.

Swiss airline Baboo's weekly Saturday service from Oxford to Geneva commenced in December 2009. The service was augmented by a link to Rome through Alitalia Airlines; passengers were thus able to travel from Oxford to Rome, via Geneva.

In January 2010 the airport announced the launch of daily flights to Edinburgh to be operated by new start-up, Varsity Express. However flights were suspended within a week, and the airline ceased operations on 8 March 2010. A spokesman for Oxford Airport later confirmed that talks were under way with other operators, with a view to re-establishing the Oxford-Edinburgh route. It was emphasised that only well-established operators would be invited to service the route.

Plans for a 17,800 m^{2} (192,000 sq ft) expansion of high-strength apron and a new 4,400 m^{2} (47,000 sq ft) hangar were outlined at the end of July 2010. The intention was to create capacity for up to 40 medium to large executive jets, in order to cater for major public events such as the Olympic Games.

In January 2012, Manx2 announced the start of a scheduled service from Oxford to the Isle of Man, beginning in May 2012. By 2013, this became a short-term seasonal service focused around the Isle of Man TT motorcycling event. From March 2013 to August 2013, Minoan Air flew from Oxford to both Dublin and Edinburgh.

== Current ==
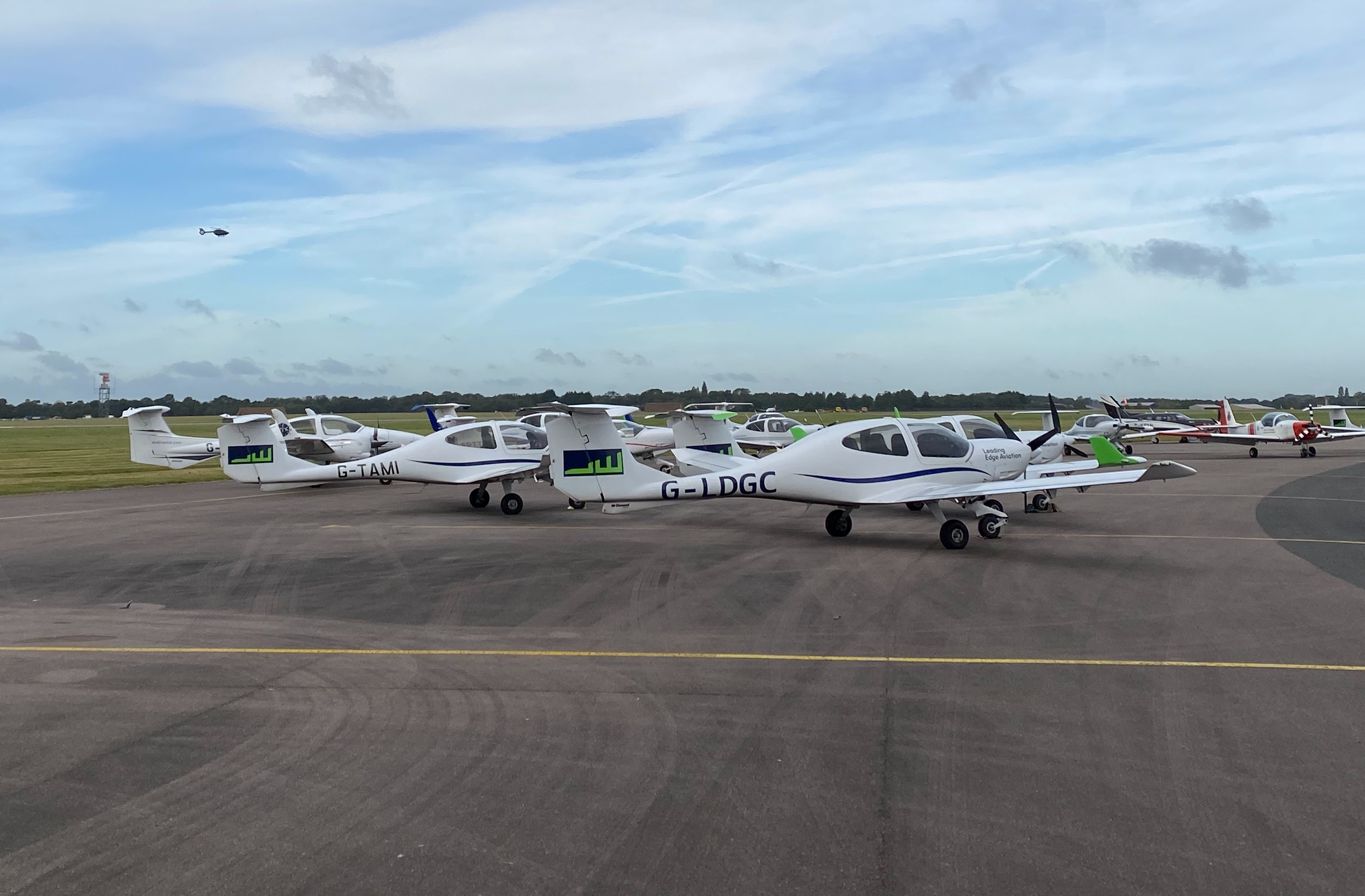
Leading Edge Aviation

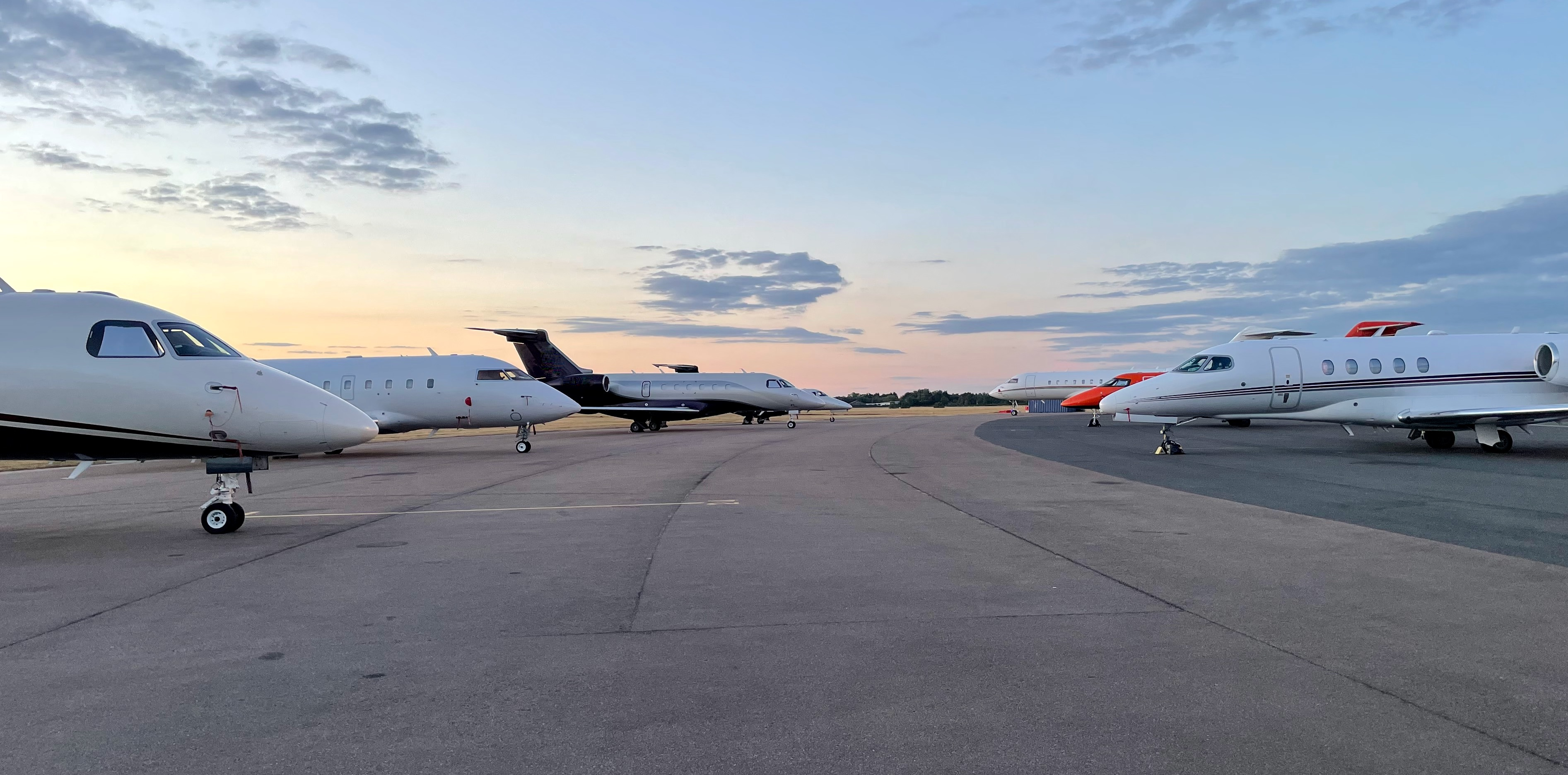
Apron view

In 2021 training flights comprised 35% of the airport's activity; mostly from Leading Edge Aviation, CAE Oxford and Pilot Flight Training. Business aviation, both private and charter, comprised 10% of operations, and the remaining 55% was mainly private and recreational general aviation activity.

The airport's proximity (about 25 miles (40 km)) to Silverstone Circuit attracts an increase in business aviation activity during the British Grand Prix. As well as the Formula One event, the Moto GP also brings air charter flights for passengers and teams attending the event.

Companies based at Oxford Airport include CAE Oxford, Leading Edge Aviation, Airbus Helicopters, Volare Aviation, Go Fly Oxford, Fly-LSA/LS Airmotive and Capital Air Services.

In December 2009, Oxford was voted the Best British Business Aviation Airport at the Airport Operators Association Annual Awards Ceremony in London.

In late 2021, a new hangar was completed. At 63,000 square feet (5,900 m^{2}) and 140 metres (460 ft) long, it can hold several Bombardier Global 7500, Gulfstream G650/G700/G800 and Dassault Falcon 7X aircraft, complete with an attached office block. Seven helipads were built at the same time.

A new Fuel Farm Facility was opened in early 2022, allowing for an increased capacity of Jet A1 and Sustainable Aviation Fuel (SAF). A new airside Self Service Avgas facility was also installed, allowing for visiting light aircraft to easily refuel using a Credit Card.

In 2021 the airport upgraded its Rescue Fire Fighting Service (RFFS) Category to CAT 6, allowing for short notice diversions and acceptance of larger aircraft to use the airport, such as the Boeing 737-700 BBJ, Airbus A320 and Embraer E-Jet E2 family. Upgrades include a new Fire Station (opened in 2023) and three new Fire Tenders to complement.

== Expansion ==
The airport has considered new scheduled routes, including flights to Amsterdam, Belfast, Edinburgh, Frankfurt Airport, Glasgow, Jersey, Munich and Paris. These markets are said to be the more viable routes for the airport. In December 2015, the UK government confirmed funding support for a proposed reinstatement of the Oxford – Edinburgh route.

However, the primary focus today is the London region business aviation market where the airport is the sixth busiest for this sector in the UK, but hosts the fourth-busiest FBO (Fixed-Base Operation – VIP aircraft handling facility) with over 5,500 business aircraft movements a year. Within the private and business aviation sector, the airport handled over 8,000 private passengers in 2015 whilst such flights were originating from or destined for well over 50 different overseas airports including the US, Canada, African and Middle-Eastern cities.

A joint construction of a new MRO facility is underway for the UK headquarters of Airbus Helicopters. The 14-acre (5.7 ha), £40+ million site was opened in 2024 by William, Prince of Wales.

The northern taxiway has been rerouted and extended to the end of the runway, removing the need for backtracking for departure, and moving the noise away from local residents. The first phase was completed and the first aircraft used the taxiway on 8 November 2022. The second phase of the taxiway was operational from May 2023.

== Technical information ==
The main runway (Code 3C) is fully grooved and 1,552 m (5,092 ft). In 2007 the airport re-surfaced, strengthened and widened the main runway, taxiways and aprons, and installed new airfield ground lighting and a CAT 1 instrument landing system (ILS). In early 2012, a new Thales primary and secondary radar system was installed.

In 2008 a new £2.5m business aviation terminal was completed (FBO) and is operated by OxfordJet. The airport can handle aircraft up to and including the Boeing BBJ and Airbus ACJ series. For the business aviation operator, the airport is an approximately 90-minute drive time from the West End area of central London but offers helicopter shuttles in 25 minutes to central London's Battersea Heliport which is co-owned with London Oxford Airport.

== Ground transport ==
The local bus services S7 and 800 operated by Stagecoach West connects the airport to Kidlington, Yarnton, Cowley, Witney and Oxford. Although the Cherwell Valley Line passes close to the airport, it has no direct rail service. At the time when scheduled flights were operating, direct shuttle bus services operated to Oxford City Centre and train station.

The airport is off the A44 and A4260 roads which both lead to Oxford city centre, and it is about 7 miles (11 km) from junction 9 of the M40 motorway.

== Accidents and incidents ==
- In 1941, pioneer aviator Amy Johnson went off course while on a flight to Oxford Airport from Blackpool and crashed in the Thames Estuary.
- On 6 December 2003, three people were killed at Oxford Airport when a Socata TBM 700 crashed while on approach. The Air Accidents Investigation Branch found no cause for the crash. There were no technical problems with the plane. The plane went into an uncontrolled roll and crashed, killing Paul-Louis Halley, a French billionaire, his wife and the pilot.
- An Oxford Aviation Training aircraft crashed shortly after takeoff in August 2006. The PA28 Piper Cherokee breached the airport's perimeter fence, and came to a stop upside down on the adjoining public road. Despite significant aircraft damage and fuel leakage, no fire ensued, and no-one was hurt in the incident.
- On 15 January 2010, at about 1400GMT, a Piper PA-31 Navajo crashed by the A4095 (near the airport), killing two people. Four crews from Oxfordshire Fire and Rescue Service, and the South Central Ambulance Service, attended, but the fire was not put out for 1 hour and 40 minutes due to the icy conditions and remote location making laying hoses difficult. The UK's AAIB investigated the accident.

== See also ==
- Airports of London
- List of airports in the United Kingdom and the British Crown Dependencies
- List of former Royal Air Force stations
- List of Royal Air Force stations
- Oxford-Cambridge Arc
- RAF Brize Norton
