= Citywing =

Airline from the Isle of Man (2012–2017)

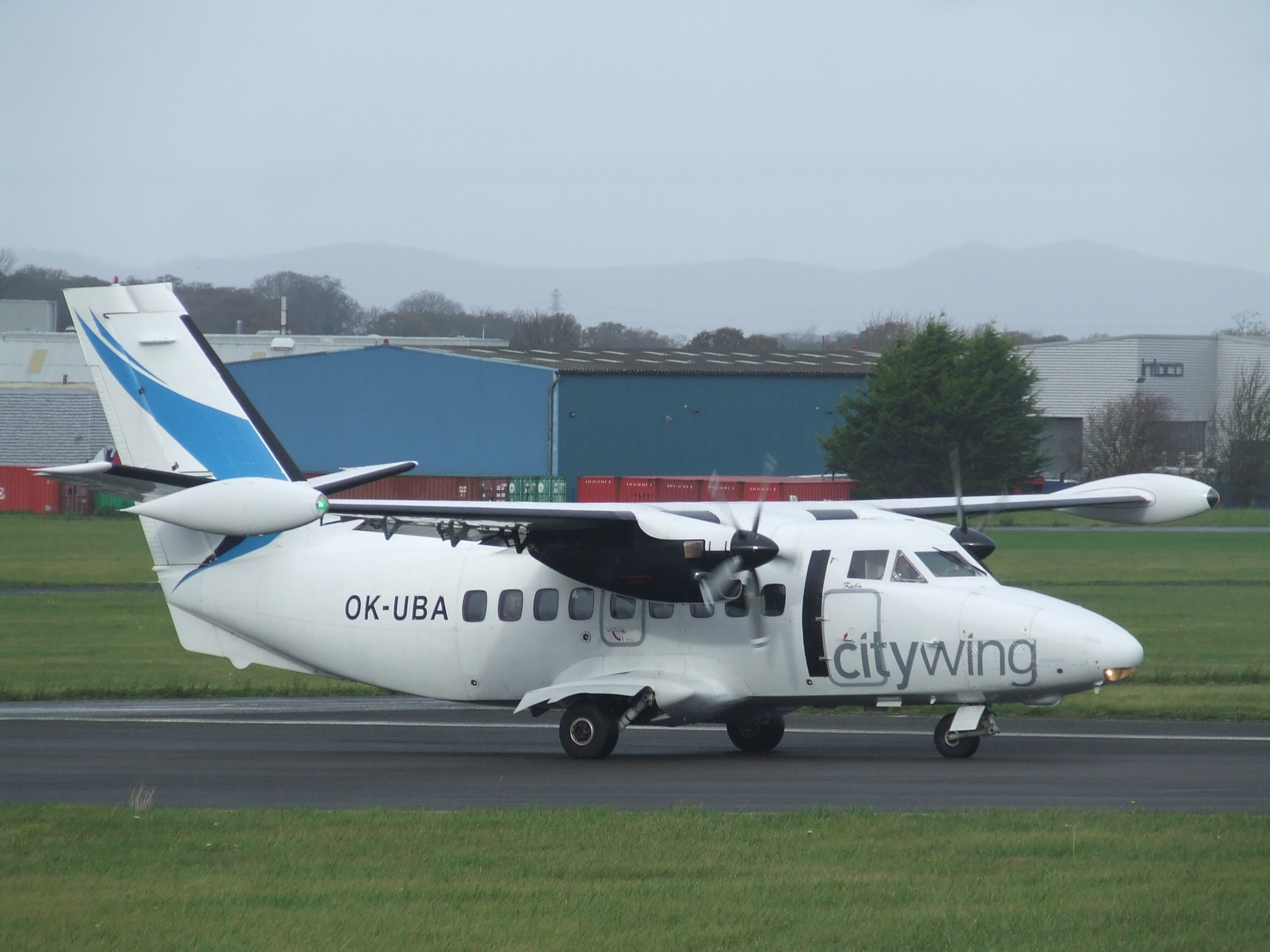
- Let L-410s
- Industry: Aerospace and travel
- Founded: 22 November 2012
- Defunct: 10 March 2017
- Key people: David Buck (Managing Director)
- Website: Archived official website at the Wayback Machine (archive index)

Citywing was an Isle of Man based company that sold seats on scheduled flights operated with leased aircraft. Flights linked several airports in the British Isles, with the company having a base at Isle of Man Airport. Its head office was in Hangar 9 at Isle of Man Airport in Ballasalla.

== History ==
In November 2012, managing director David Buck led a management buyout of Manx2. On 1 January 2013 the assets of Manx2 were acquired by the new company, Citywing, and seats went on sale on the new company's website. The first Citywing-branded flight took off on 2 January 2013.

During 2014, the route network expanded to include flights from Glasgow to the Isle of Man. Citywing took over the Cardiff to Anglesey public service obligation route in January 2016 after the previous operator went bankrupt.

On 23 February 2017, Citywing Flight 502 (a Van Air Let L-410, OK-LAZ) to Belfast from Isle of Man Ronaldsway Airport was forced to turn back due to deteriorating weather conditions. The following day, Van Air lost its route licences. As a result, Citywing contracted Sprint Air for certain flight services on 2 and 3 March. On 10 March 2017, Citywing announced that after Van Air Europe's loss their UK license they had been unable to find a suitable business partner to operate its services. All flights from 11 March 2017 were terminated and the company was put into liquidation. Citywing cited heavy losses after the need to source leased aircraft to replace Van Air Europe on such short notice.

== Destinations ==
Citywing operated regular scheduled flights to and from these destinations before its bankruptcy in March 2017.

| Country | City | Airport | Notes |
|---|---|---|---|
| Isle of Man | Ronaldsway | Isle of Man Airport | Base |
| Jersey | St Brelade | Jersey Airport | Seasonal |
| United Kingdom | Anglesey | Anglesey Airport | |
| United Kingdom | Belfast | Belfast City Airport | Base |
| United Kingdom | Blackpool | Blackpool Airport | Base |
| United Kingdom | Cardiff | Cardiff Airport | Base |
| United Kingdom | Glasgow | Glasgow Airport | |
| United Kingdom | Gloucester | Gloucestershire Airport | |
| United Kingdom | Newcastle upon Tyne | Newcastle Airport | |

== Fleet ==
As Citywing was a virtual airline without its own aircraft operations licence, it leased aircraft from Van Air Europe for all of its services. The Van Air Europe aircraft were four twin-turboprops Let L-410s. Citywing temporarily chartered a Saab 340 from Sprint Air after the loss of Van Air Let L-410s. Prior to using Van Air Europe aircraft, Citywing leased a BAe Jetstream 31 from Links Air until the latter lost its UK operating licence.
