= Eustace Grenfell =

British flying ace

- Born: Eustace Osborne Grenfell; 26 August 1890; Southend, Essex, England
- Died: 7 March 1964 (aged 73); Chichester, Sussex, England
- Military career
- Allegiance: United Kingdom
- Branch: Infantry; aviation
- Service years: 1913–1942
- Rank: Major
- Units: Duke of Cornwall's Light Infantry, No. 1 Squadron RFC, No. 60 Squadron RFC, No. 23 Squadron RFC
- Commands: RAF Biggin Hill, RAF Thornaby, RAF Gosport
- Awards: Military Cross, Distinguished Flying Cross, Air Force Cross
- Other work: Developed air defence system that led to Dowding system.

Group Captain Eustace Osborne Grenfell MC DFC AFC (26 August 1890 – 7 March 1964) was an early flying ace of World War I. He was credited with eight victories. He went on to make a career of the Royal Air Force. He was instrumental in developing the integrated radar/ground control system that won the Battle of Britain.

== World War I service ==
On 2 June 1913, Eustace Osborne Grenfell was commissioned as a second lieutenant in the Duke of Cornwall's Light Infantry. On 9 November 1914, he was granted Aviator's Certificate No. 966 after qualifying on a Maurice Farman biplane at the Central Flying School at Upavon. On 22 December 1914, he was appointed a flying officer On 17 August 1915, he was officially seconded to the Royal Flying Corps in the rank of lieutenant.

On 5 September 1915, he was a lieutenant serving as a temporary captain and appointed a flight commander. Grenfell scored his first aerial victory on 13 September 1915, flying a Morane-Saulnier and driving down an Albatros reconnaissance plane. He used the Morane-Saulnier L, which was the world's first airplane built with a gun firing forward through the propeller. Grenfell used this same crude early fighter to shoot down a second Albatros recce plane on 7 December 1915.

By January 1916, Grenfell had upgraded to a Morane "Bullet", which he used in a quadruple victory on the 17th. On that day, in a forty-minute dogfight over the Houthoulst Forest, he drove down a Fokker Eindekker, forced another to land, put another one out of control, and drove down an Albatros two-seater.

On 1 April 1916, he was appointed a flight commander at the Central Flying School back in England. On 12 July 1916, he was succeeded as an instructor by J. P. C. Cooper.

Grenfell returned to battle when he was assigned to 60 Squadron, which was commanded by Alan Scott, and where he served with Albert Ball. Now using a newer fighter, a Nieuport, he drove an Albatros D.I fighter down out of control on 20 October 1916. However, it was his last victory, on 28 December, that was the most memorable. Aided by Keith Caldwell, Henry Meintjes, and three other pilots, he forced an Albatros C.II to land in a field. Because the German plane was a new type, the victors were anxious to capture it whole for its intelligence value. They landed surrounding it, four of them crashing their Nieuports in the process. Grenfell was one of them, and the only casualty, with a broken leg. The unwounded German observer managed to set the Albatros afire; it exploded, injuring the observer and several British infantrymen.

On 19 November 1917, Grenfell, who was a lieutenant brevetted as a temporary major, reverted from squadron leader back to flight commander and temporary captain with seniority set back 5 September 1915.

Having scored five of his victories in the Morane-Saulnier N, he was the most successful pilot in the type.

== Post World War I service ==
Despite his setback, Grenfell remained in the Royal Air Force. In December 1918, he was selected as officer commanding of RAF Biggin Hill. In December 1918, he reverted from major back to captain. In 1923, he transferred from 27 Squadron in India to 1 Squadron in Iraq. On 30 June 1923, he was promoted from flight lieutenant to squadron leader.

On 1 January 1924, he was transferred to the RAF Depot on Home Establishment. Then, while assigned to 7 Squadron, he and Charles Portal won the Laurence Minot memorial bombing trophy in September 1927.

On 1 July 1931, he was promoted squadron leader to wing commander. On 3 August 1931, he was transferred to RAF Gosport for admin duties. It was during this stretch that he served in administrative capacity; in mid 1932, Grenfell took on flying duties at Gosport.

In January 1933, he was once again selected as OC of RAF Biggin Hill. This would be the most momentous assignment of his life. Beginning 4 August 1935 and extending for seven months, he was in charge of experiments in intercepting attacking enemy aircraft. The system of ground control that was developed was integrated with the brand new radar that was being developed; that same system would be the key to British victory in the Battle of Britain and the continued existence of Britain.

On 1 January 1937, Grenfell was promoted from wing commander to group captain. He was briefly OC of RAF Thornaby 12 May 1938 – 28 July 1938. On 28 August 1938, he moved on to the same post at RAF Gosport. On 17 February 1942, he retired from the military.

== Honours and awards ==
Military Cross (MC)

Lieutenant (temporary Captain) Eustace Osborne Grenfell, Royal Artillery and Royal Flying Corps. For conspicuous gallantry and skill. He attacked single-handed and brought down three Fokker aeroplanes. Captain Grenfell has shown great bravery and initiative at all times." (Supplement to the London Gazette, 15 March 1916) 2877

Awarded the Air Force Cross on 2 November 1918.

Awarded the Distinguished Flying Cross on 30 May 1924.
