= Plotter (RAF) =

Role in a Royal Air Force operations room

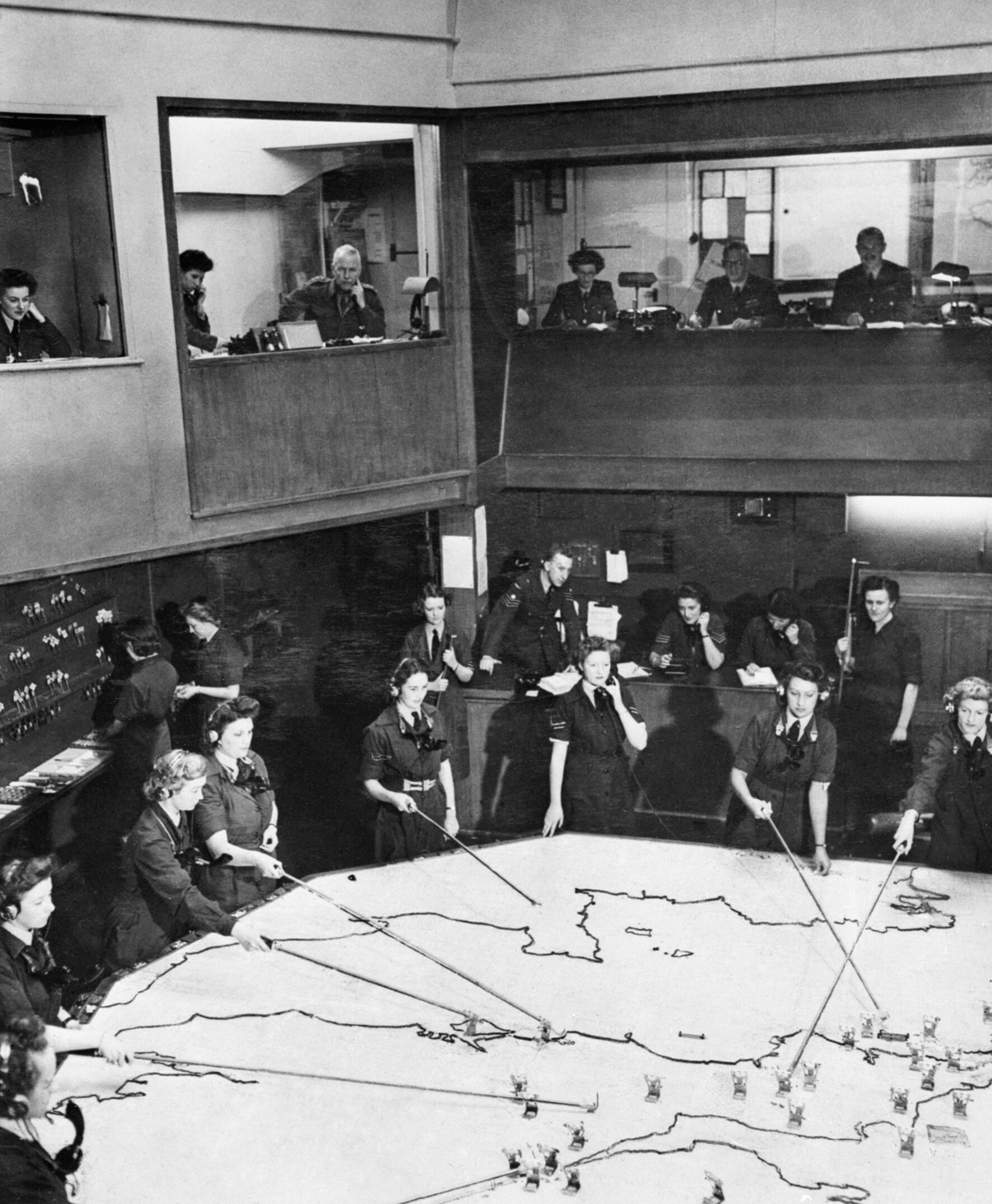
The Operations Room at RAF Fighter Command's No. 10 Group Headquarters, RAF Rudloe Manor (RAF Box), Wiltshire, showing WAAF plotters and duty officers at work, 1943

Plotters were employed on an early form of air traffic monitoring that played a vital role in World War II, including during the Battle of Britain, The Blitz and the bombing of British cities that followed. They worked at individual RAF stations' Sector Control Rooms or in the central Group Control Rooms that directed the operations of RAF fighters. The majority of plotters were female, members of the Women's Auxiliary Air Force (WAAFs).

== History ==
Captain Philip Edward Broadley Fooks transferred from the Royal Garrison Artillery to the Anti-Aircraft Defences, Home Forces in June 1918 and he suggested displaying the latest information graphically on a large horizontal map at central London control near Horse Guards in Spring Gardens. This map was marked with a grid upon which different-shaped and annotated pieces representing the airborne forces were colour coded to the clocks to distinguish fresh from older information and were manipulated with wooden rakes by operators guided by information read to them from the incoming reports from field observers and acoustic detectors.

== Reports ==
By World War II the control room (depicted in countless films) was essentially the same as in World War I, however, by then plotting depended on reports from the newly installed Chain Home radar stations that detected aircraft approaching the coastline, and the Royal Observer Corps posts that spotted hostile and friendly aircraft over land.

Such reports were fed to a Filter Room, where Filter Plotters processed the mass of incoming data by hand and fed a digest to the underground Operations (Ops) room. There, information about aircraft movements was passed to a large number of plotters stationed around a giant table bearing a map of the section. Details about the number of aircraft, their position, height and bearings were transferred to counters that were positioned and moved around the map by the plotters, in a similar way to a croupier at a roulette table, using plotting rods that were adjustable in length and magnetised to pick up the plots.

Each plotter was responsible for aircraft movements in a particular sector, changing the plots regularly so that the whole picture of a raid could be monitored by the Group controllers who were stationed in a gallery above the plotting table.

== See also ==
- Dowding system
- RAF Uxbridge
- Sector clock
