= Battle of Britain Bunker =

Royal Air Force WWII operations room

- Uxbridge, Middlesex, England
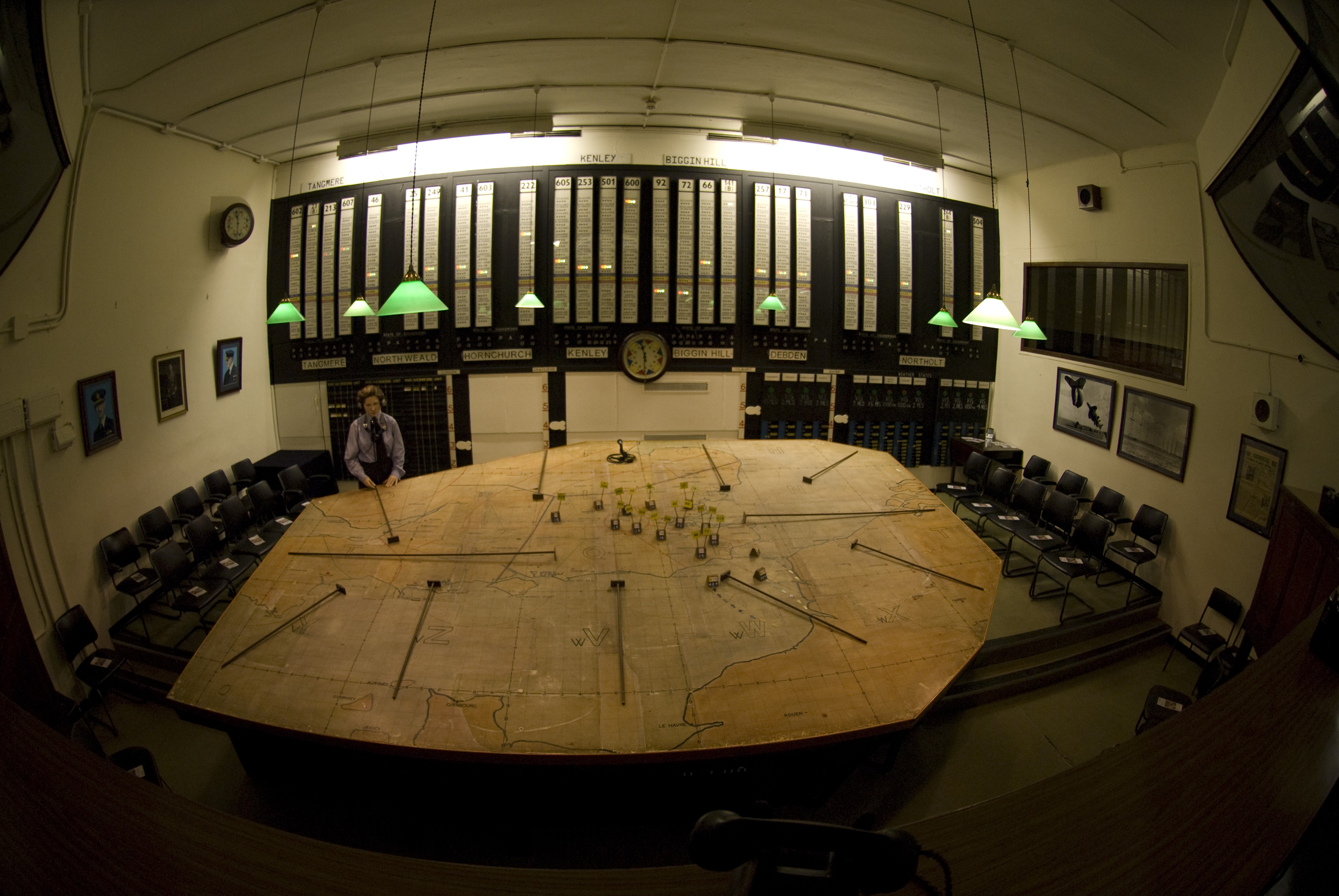
- The No. 11 Group Operations Room

Site information
- Type: Underground operations room
- Owner: Air Ministry
- Operator: Royal Air Force

Location
- Shown within Greater London
- Coordinates: 51°32′28.5″N 000°27′55″W

Site history
- Built: February - August 1939
- Built by: Sir Robert McAlpine
- In use: 1939–1945
- Battles/wars: Second World War

Garrison information
- Occupants: No. 11 Group RAF

Listed Building – Grade I
- Official name: Group Operations Room
- Designated: 1 December 2005
- Reference no.: 1392556

The Battle of Britain Bunker is an underground operations room at RAF Uxbridge, formerly used by No. 11 Group Fighter Command during the Second World War. Fighter aircraft operations were controlled from there throughout the War but most notably during the Battle of Britain and on D-Day. Today it is run by Hillingdon Council as a heritage attraction with attached museum. The museum was opened in 1985, with an above ground visitor centre opened in March 2018.

The Bunker is located at RAF Uxbridge, not far from Uxbridge town centre and Uxbridge Underground station.

== Background ==
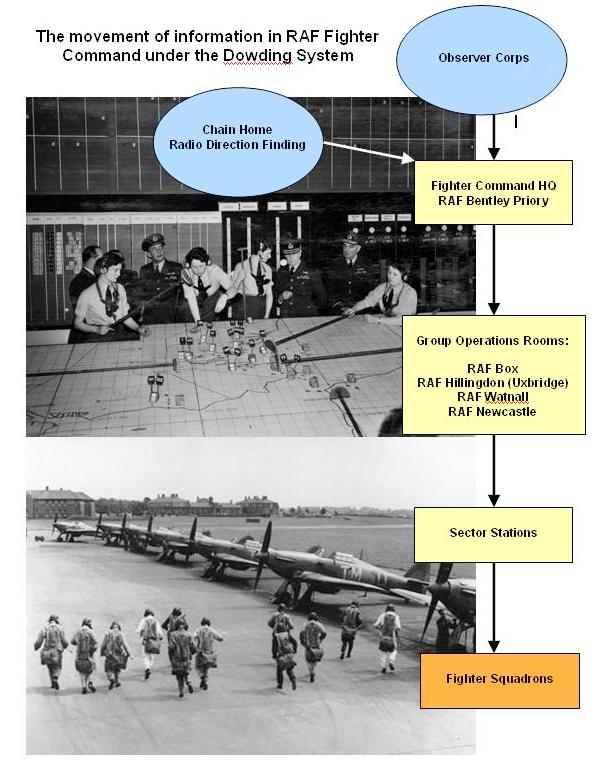
Flow diagram illustrating the Dowding System

As the location of No. 11 Group RAF's Operations Room, The Battle of Britain Bunker was one of the key parts of the world's first integrated air defence system. Often known as the "Dowding system" (after Air Chief Marshal Sir Hugh Dowding, Commander-in-Chief Fighter Command at the time of installation), the system linked Fighter Command with Anti-Aircraft Command, Barrage Balloon Command, the Observer Corps, Chain Home Radio Direction Finding (radar), and the intelligence services. Under the system, these organisations worked together for the first time in order to achieve one goal: the successful defence of the UK's airspace.

No. 11 Group was an important part of the system for several reasons: Firstly, as one of four group headquarters, No. 11 Group's Operations Controller was responsible for making key decisions that would affect the outcomes of aerial battles - how many fighter aircraft to scramble, which type of aircraft, which squadrons to use, when to scramble them, where to scramble them from, where to scramble them to, etc. Secondly and also due to its role as a group headquarters, No. 11 Group was responsible for organising and coordinating the activities of seven sector stations at which its fighter squadrons were based - RAFs Kenley, North Weald, Debden, Biggin Hill, Tangmere, Hornchurch and Northolt. And thirdly, the Bunker and its Operations Room were the prototypes by which the other five group headquarters (No. 9 Group at RAF Barton Hall, No. 10 Group at RAF Box, No. 12 Group at RAF Watnall, No. 13 Group at RAF Newcastle and No. 14 Group at Raigmore) were planned and constructed.

The Operations Room displayed various pieces of information in different ways, which the controller would then use in order to make his important decisions. The location of both enemy and friendly aircraft formations was displayed using numbered blocks on a map table. The current activities of No. 11 Group's squadrons e.g. "At Standby", "Enemy Sighted", "Ordered to Land", etc. were displayed on a "tote" board using a series of lights. Current weather conditions at No. 11 Group's sector stations were indicated with a system of coloured discs. And the passage of time was tracked using a coordinated system of clock and coloured indicators. All information was received from either Fighter Command headquarters or the sector stations via telephone.

== History ==
=== Construction ===
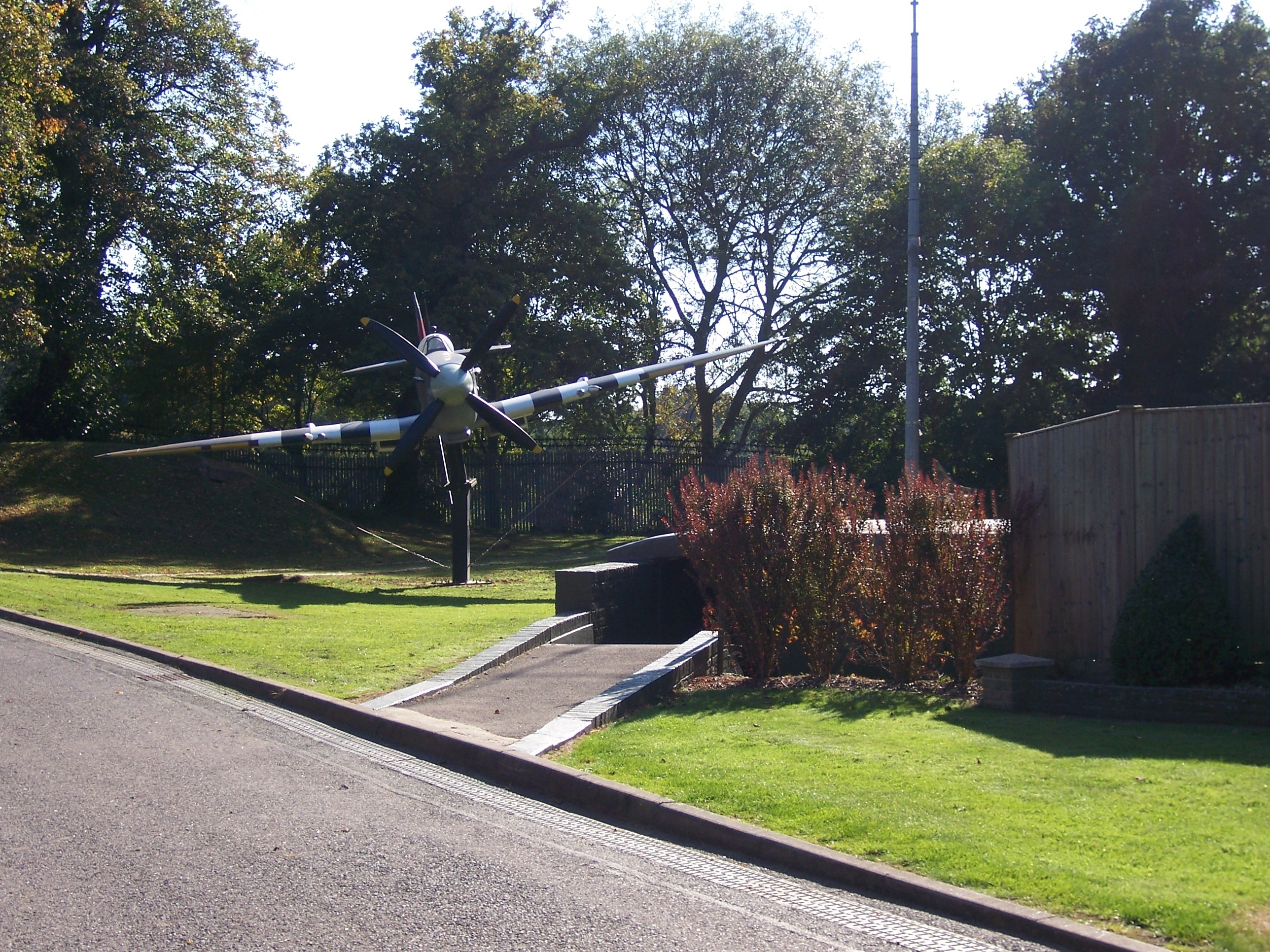
Replica Spitfire Mark IXc gate guardian outside the Battle of Britain Bunker

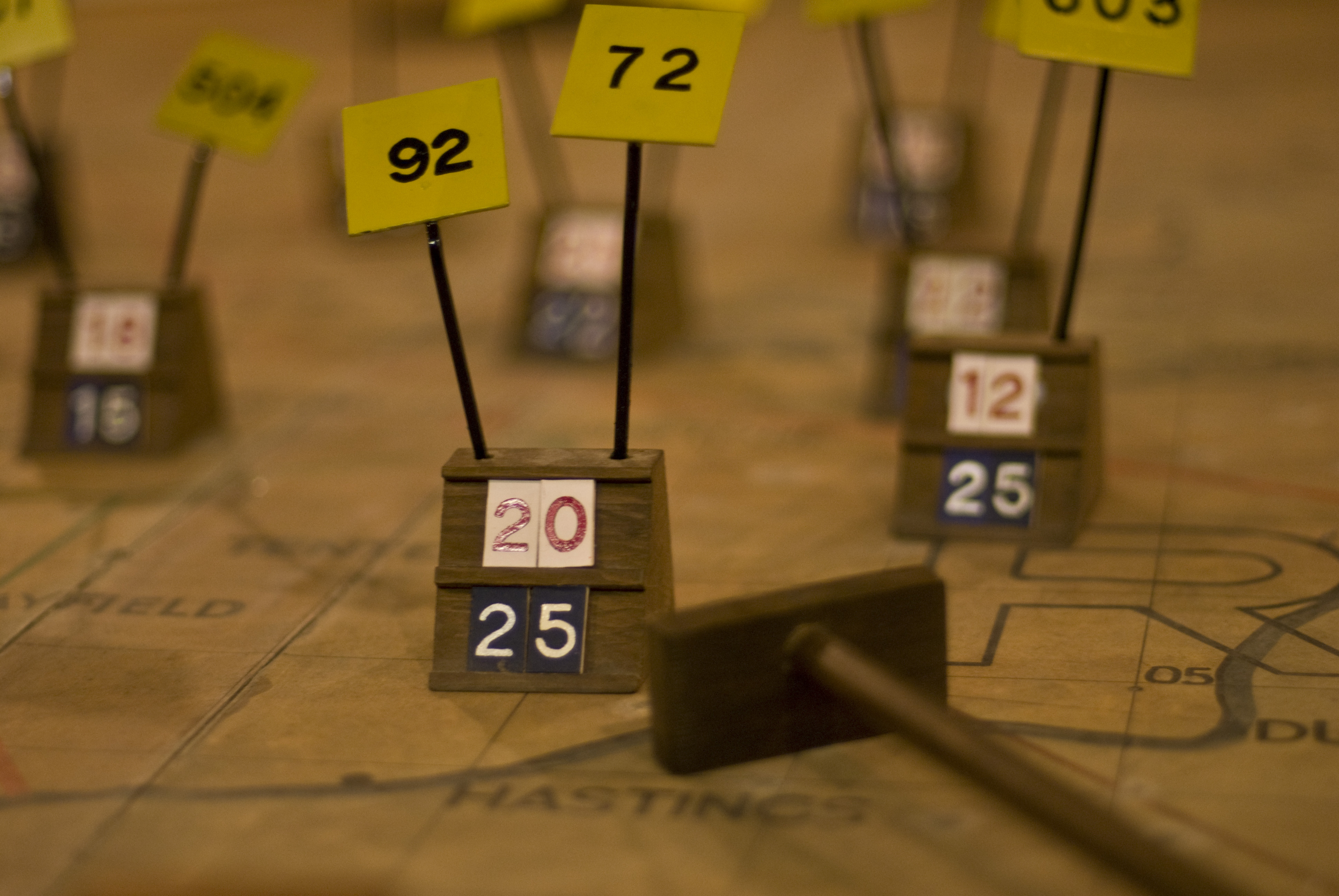
Plots on the table

Following excavations in 1938, the Bunker was constructed between February and August 1939 with the express intention of housing the No. 11 Group (Fighter Command) Operations Room, in essence a number of rooms with various roles and functions. Their previous Operations Room had been in an above ground building at RAF Uxbridge, but following the Munich Crisis of September 1938 and with the spectre of war on the horizon, the RAF began work on a protected underground alternative. The Bunker was built by Sir Robert McAlpine, a civilian company, but its construction was to remain top secret to avoid the plans falling into enemy hands.

The floor of the Bunker is 60 ft underground and is accessed by a staircase of 76 steps. All utilities into and out of the building - electricity, water, telephone lines, sewage - are carried along pipes down this staircase. The walls, floor and ceiling are approximately 1 metre thick and are made of concrete with waterproof lining. The solid concrete walls and the approximately 30 ft of earth above the Bunker's ceiling meant that no bomb of the period could penetrate it. A ventilation and air filtration system, which still is in operation, was installed to provide an air supply to the Operations Room staff.

=== Second World War ===
Distinguished Flying Cross displayed in Battle of Britain Bunker

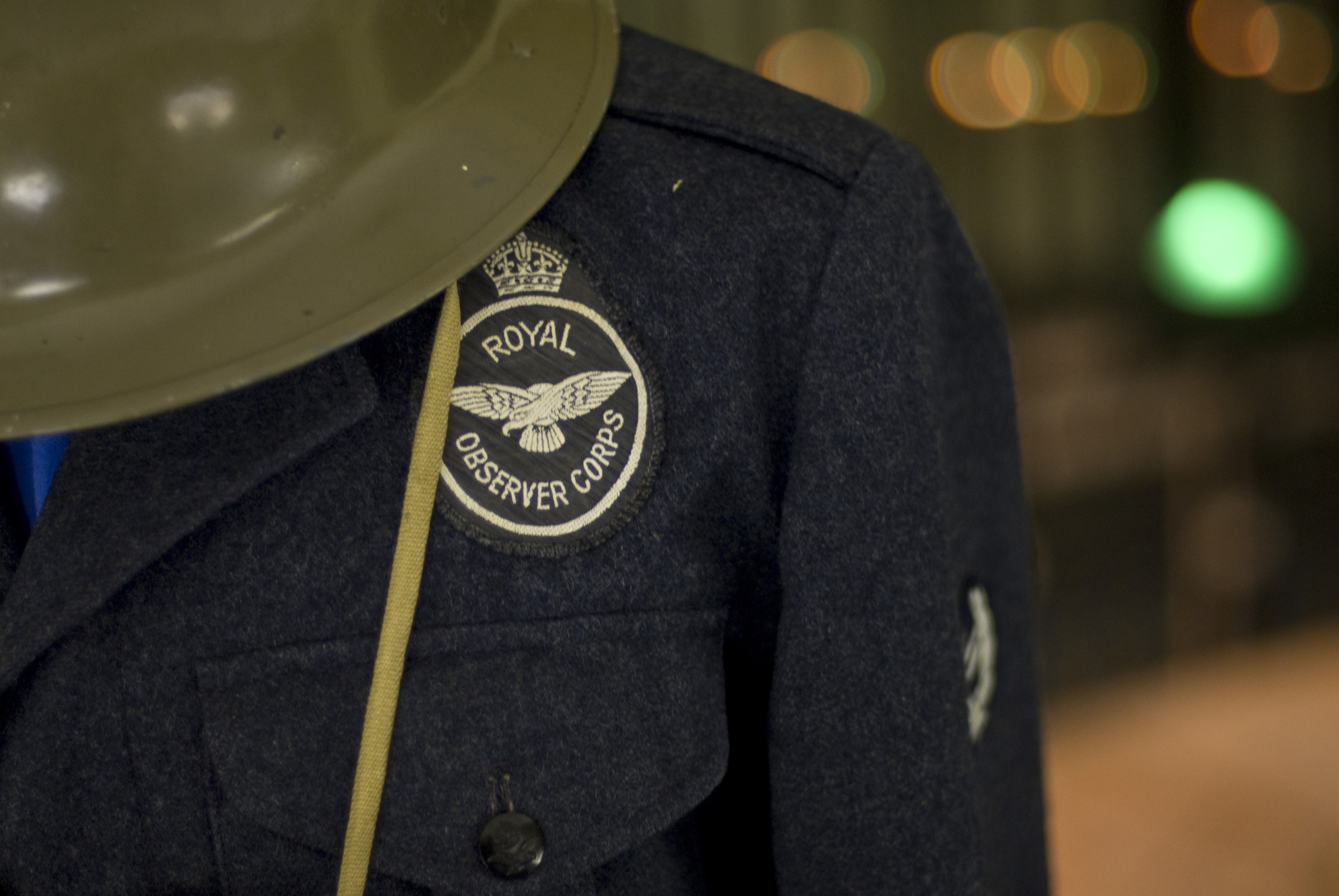
Royal Observer Corps Uniform displayed in Battle of Britain Bunker

On 6 September 1939 in the Battle of Barking Creek, three days into the Second World War No. 11 Group was involved in an incident of friendly fire. The Chain Home radar system reported incoming enemy aircraft for the first time and the No. 11 Group Controller, working in the Bunker, despatched 56 Squadron and 74 Squadron to deal with the threat. Unfortunately the Spitfires of 74 Squadron mistook the Hurricanes of 56 Squadron for the enemy and shot two of them down. In April 1940 Air Vice-Marshal Keith Park was posted to No. 11 Group as its Air Officer Commanding and joined the team in the bunker.

The Luftwaffe waged a campaign against the Royal Air Force aimed at destroying Fighter Command. Of the four Fighter Command groups, No. 11 Group, controlled from the bunker, saw the most action and shot down many of the 1,733 German aircraft lost. On 12 August 1940, the Luftwaffe, which had been attacking British ports, switched targets and attacked the Chain Home radar system but only minor damage to the radar system was sustained. On the following day, known to the Germans as "Eagle Day", they started targeting British airfields. The prime minister, Winston Churchill, visited the bunker on 16 August 1940 and spoke the famous words "Never in the field of human conflict was so much owed, by so many, to so few". He said the phrase as he got into his car, close to the entrance of the Bunker, then repeated them in the House of Commons on 20 August 1940. The King and Queen visited the bunker on 6 September 1940. After the Luftwaffe switched its target to London on 1 September 1940, Churchill visited again on 15 September 1940 and wrote in his memoirs about the moment at which "all of the bulbs glowed red", referring to the squadron state boards in the Operations Room and indicating that every No. 11 Group squadron was engaged in combat at the same time.

In December 1940 Air Vice Marshal Sir Trafford Leigh-Mallory, became air Officer Commanding No. 11 Group. The old plotting system of wooden markers and wooden croupier-style pushing sticks were replaced with metal plotting markers and magnetic sticks, and the old tote system of light-indicators was replaced with a slat-board system with hanging information. After the final stages of the Battle of Britain, No. 11 Group was largely occupied with defending London against the Blitz. No. 11 Group was involved in providing air support for the Dieppe Raid (Operation Jubilee) on 19 August 1942. The air operations section of Operation Overlord, the 6 June 1944 Normandy landings (D-Day), was also controlled from RAF Uxbridge.

=== Post-war ===
No. 11 Group moved to RAF Martlesham Heath on 14 April 1958 and Dowding unveiled a memorial close to the entrance to the bunker, commemorating its role during the Battle of Britain. Over nine months in 1975, the No. 11 Group Operations Room was restored to its original state.

In 1985 a museum occupying six rooms was created within the bunker by Warrant Officer Robert "Chris" Wren and the Operations Room opened for daily visits. In July 2015, the Government pledged £1 million for the restoration of the bunker, and the construction of a new visitor centre above ground. Hillingdon Council provided a further £4.5 million for the new centre. The visitor centre opened in March 2018.

== Sources ==
- Bishop, Patrick (2004). Fighter Boys (4th ed.). London: Harper Perennial. ISBN 978-0-00-653204-0.
- Bungay, Stephen. (2010) The Most Dangerous Enemy: A History of the Battle of Britain. Aurum Press ISBN 978-1-84513-481-5
- Crozier, Hazel. (2007) RAF Uxbridge 90th Anniversary 1917–2007. RAF High Wycombe: Air Command Media Services
