= Sector clock =

Colour-coded military wall clock

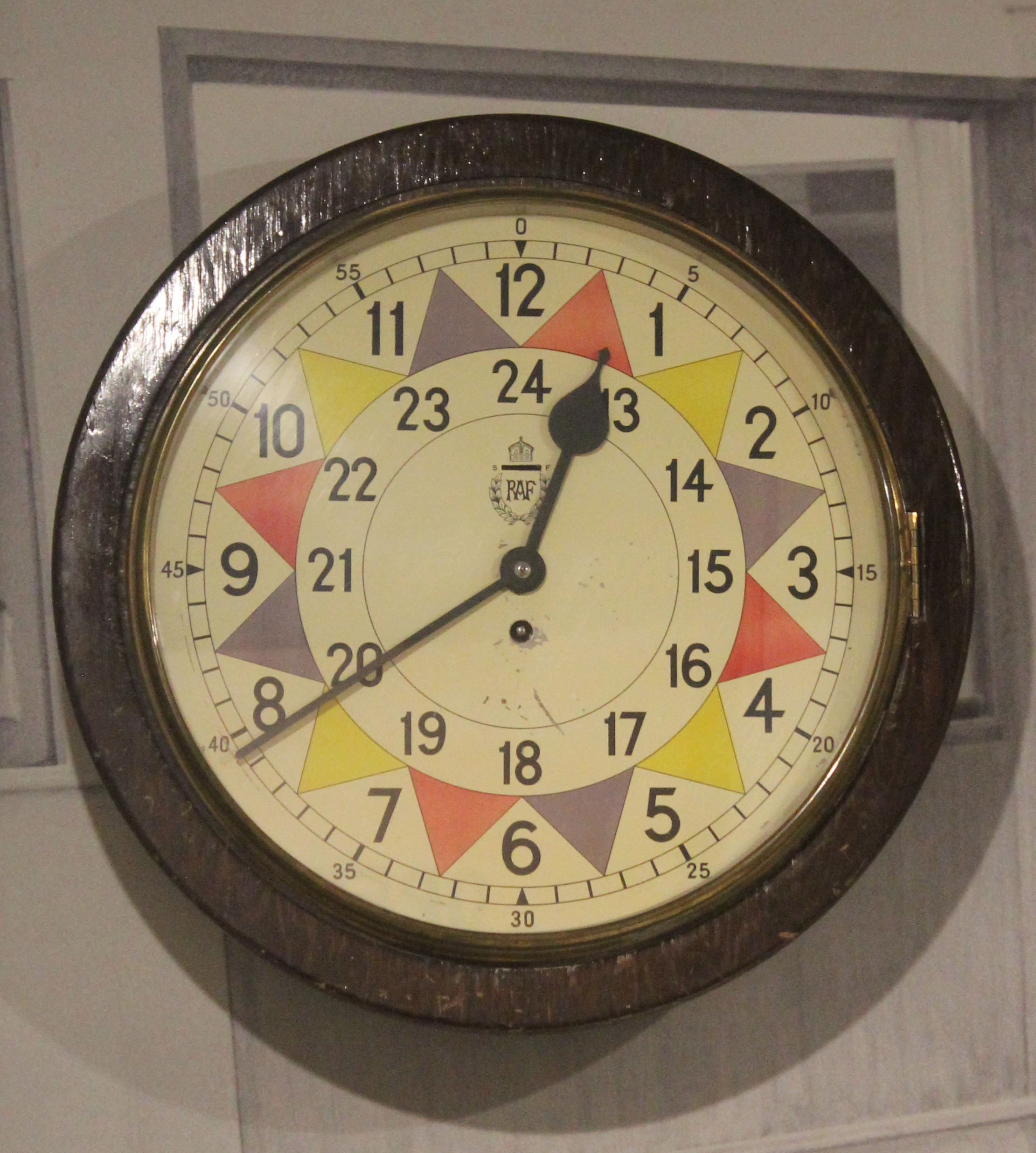
Sector clock.

A sector clock or colour change clock is a round colour-coded clock that was used at military airfields and observation posts in the United Kingdom to help track the movements of enemy aircraft and coordinate and control air defences.

== Overview ==
Developed in the United Kingdom during the First World War and originally known as "colour change clocks", the Royal Flying Corps (RFC) introduced sector clocks in 1917 to aid in the chronological monitoring and position plotting of German aircraft.

During the Second World War sector clocks played a significant role in the Battle of Britain as part of the Dowding system of air defence and continued to be used by the Royal Air Force (RAF) and Royal Observer Corps (ROC) as simple clocks and keepsakes until the end of the Cold War. Two versions of the sector clock were supplied for issue by the Air Ministry; the RAF sector clock having a "King's Crown" RAF warrant officer's insignia under the "24", the ROC issue clock having no associated insignia. The clocks are either electrical or mechanical; electric clocks usually having the coloured segments pointing inwards, mechanical clocks having the segments pointing outwards.

The United States Army Air Force (USAAF) adapted the RAF sector clock using a coloured block pattern in place of triangles.

Sector clocks are sought after by collectors of militaria/aeronautica. The clock face design also appears on wrist watches commemorating the wartime role of the sector clock.

== Function ==
The sector clock was a fundamental part of ground-controlled interception (GCI) before modern computerized systems were put in place for airspace control. The clock face is marked with five-minute red, yellow and blue triangular segments. It has an outer 12-hour ring and an inner 24-hour dial.

Aircraft position was recorded along with the colour of the triangle beneath the minute hand at the time of sighting. This was reported to sector headquarters, where counters of the relayed colour were used to represent each air raid on a large table with a map of the UK overlaid with a British Modified Grid. As the plots of the raiding aircraft moved, the counters were pushed across the map by magnetic rakes.

This system enabled fighter controllers to see very quickly where each formation was heading and allowed an estimate to be made of possible targets. The age of the information was readily apparent from the colour of the counter. Because of the simplicity of the system, decisions could be made quickly and easily.

== Gallery ==
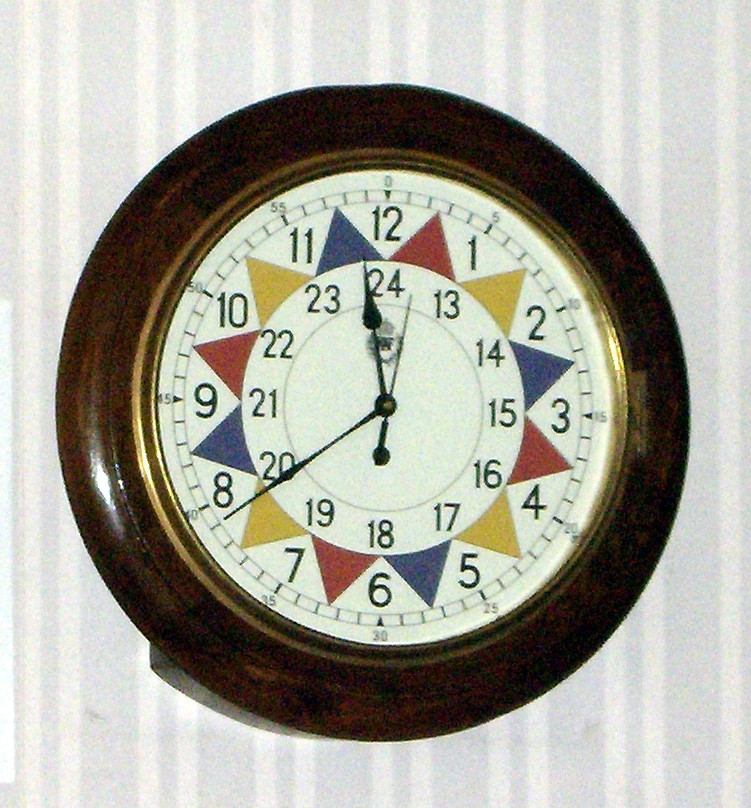
RAF-issue sector clock. Coloured triangles span 5 minute time periods. Outward pointing triangles indicate the model shown to have a mechanical mechanism.

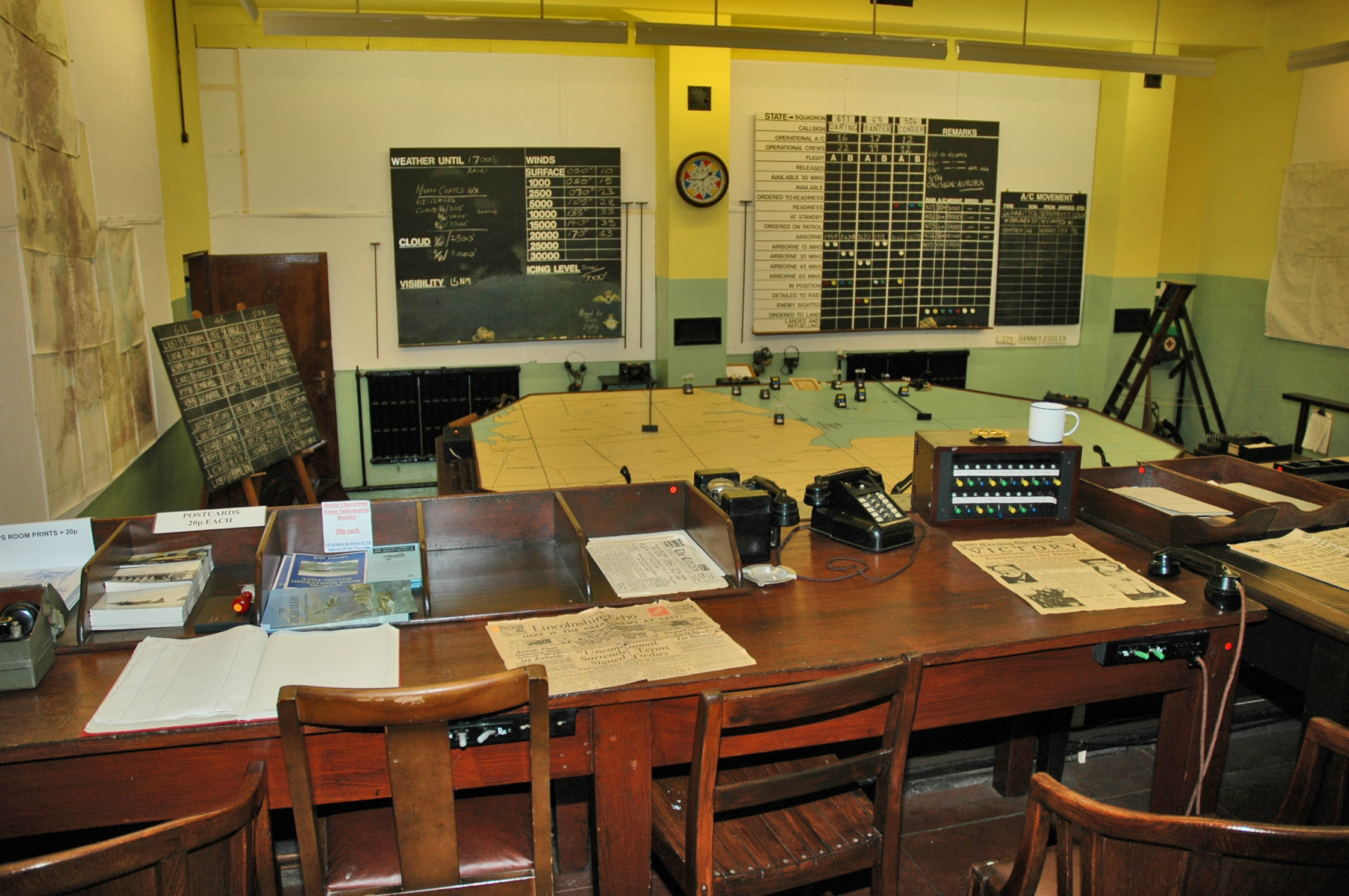
RAF Digby Operations Room with a sector clock displaying inward pointing triangles, typical of electrical models. This clock appears to show a key aperture below the dial and may be mechanical.

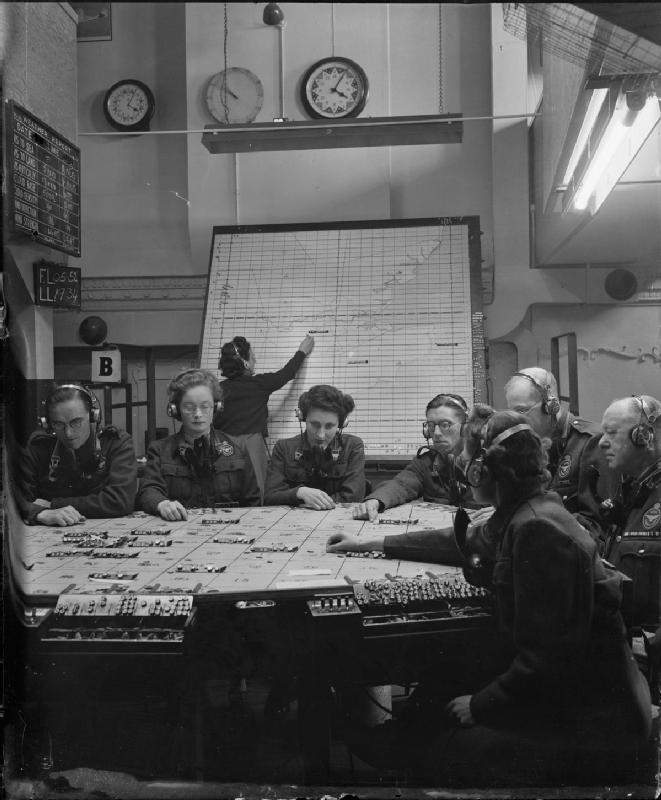
ROC-issue electrical and mechanical sector clocks in the No. 19 Group (Bromley) Operations Room. Mechanical models were often paired with electrical types as a backup in the event of power outages.

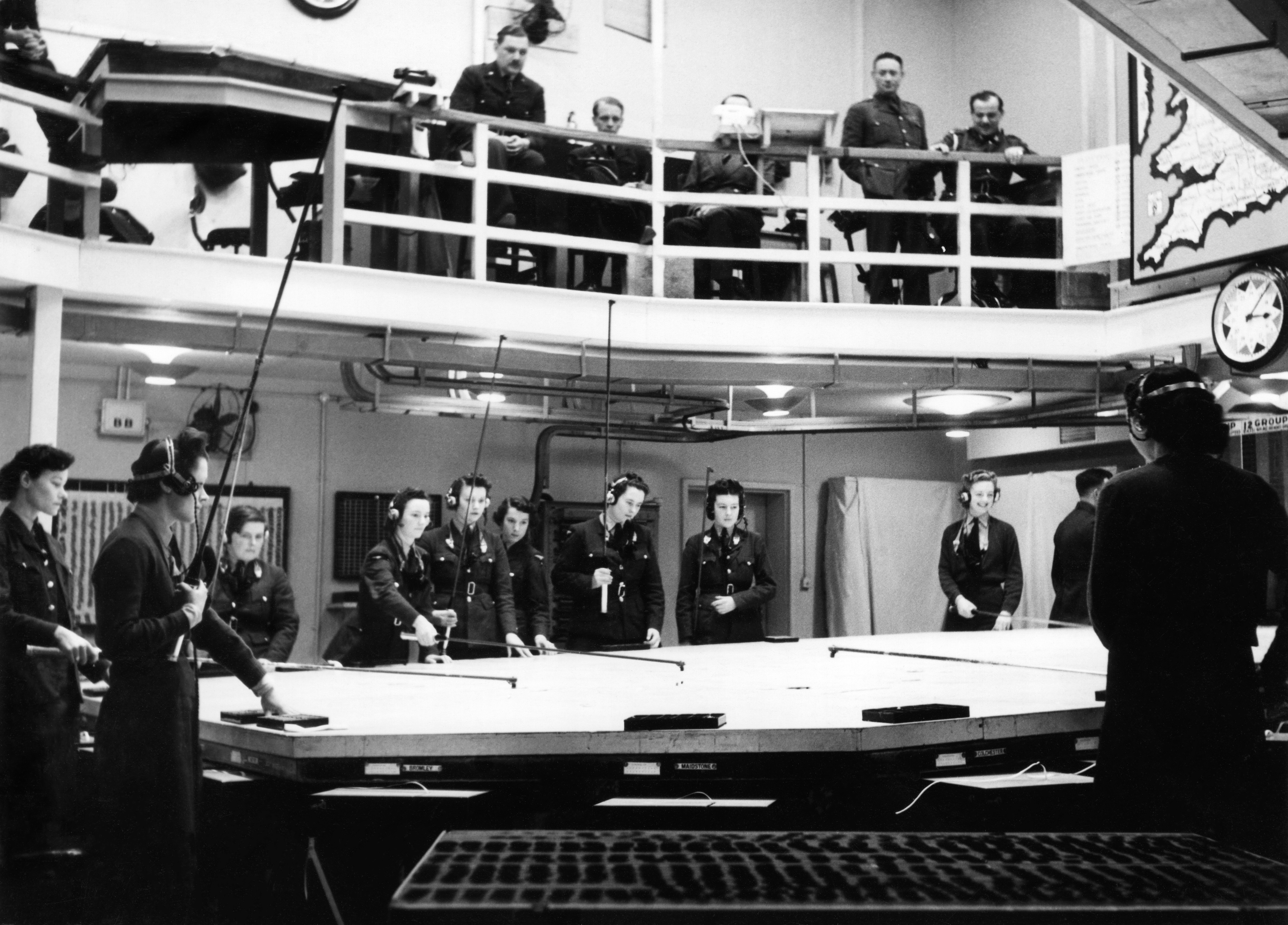
Electrical sector clock above the plotting table at headquarters Fighter Command, RAF Bentley Priory.

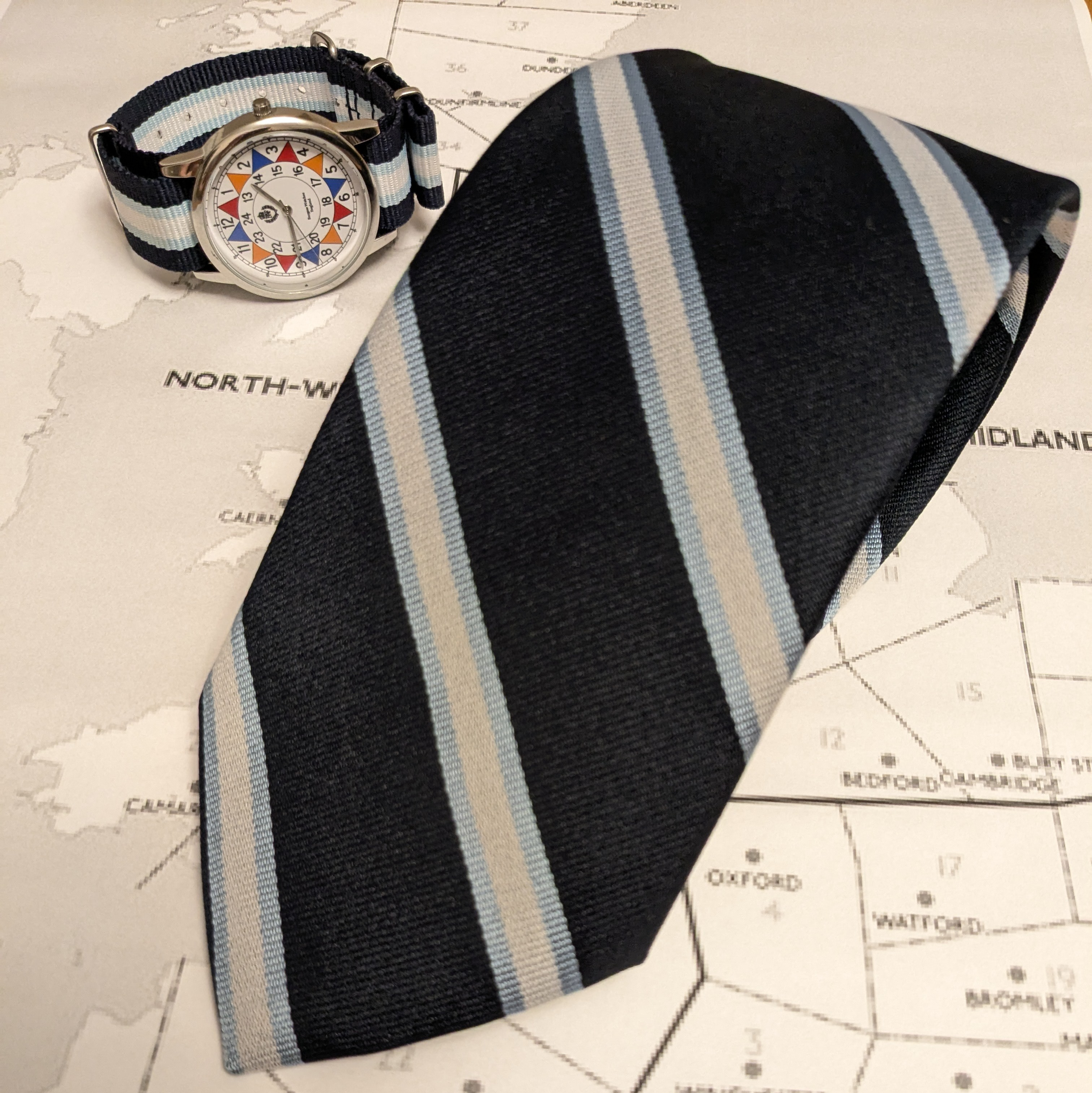
An RAF sector clock-themed wristwatch. ROC tie with matching NATO watch strap.

== See also ==
- Battle of Britain Bunker
- Dowding system
