= London Air Defence Area =

The London Air Defence Area (LADA) was the name given to the organisation created to defend London from the increasing threat from German airships during World War I. Formed in September 1915, it was commanded initially by Admiral Sir Percy Scott, a controversial figure, responsible for major advances in naval gunnery techniques, but also accused of insubordination and profiting from his inventions. In August 1917 Major-General Edward Ashmore was appointed Commander of the London Air Defence Area.

LADA was among the first wide-area air defence organizations. To coordinate the attacks on the enemy that were spread out over dozens of miles, it developed a system in which reports from ground observers were sent to a central office in the Horse Guards in downtown London. There, telephone operators would record the location of the reports on a large map of the surrounding area. The markers were Color-coded to match the colours printed on the face of a large clock, its face divided into four sections. By examining the colours, observers could tell how old the reports were, and develop vectors for the targets to aid the direction of the defences. This system was retained in the post-war era, eventually expanding in stages until it covered the entirety of the UK in what was (later) known as the Dowding system.

== Airfields ==
At the end of the war, the following airfields came under the direct control of LADA:

Station	Branch	Grid Reference	Station Opened	Station Closed	Squadrons	Current Use	External Link
Stow Maries Aerodrome	RFC	TQ83189955	9/1916	1919	B Flt, 37 Sqn	Agriculture. Most buildings still present.	Maries Airfield
Goldhanger	RNAS / RFC	TL90450885			C Flt, 37 Sqn		
Hainault Farm	RFC	TQ46759105	10/1914		44 Sqn	Agriculture / light industry. Hangars still present.	Hainault Farm Airfield
Bekesbourne		TR20055545				Housing / agriculture	
Mattishall		TG06801155				Agriculture	Mattishall Airfield
Tydd St Mary		TF458192	8/1917	5/1919	B Flt, 51 Sqn	Agriculture	
Marham						Royal Air Force flying station	
Rochford					A Flt, 37 Sqn		
Hadleigh							
Elmswell							
Suttons Farm	RFC					Hornchurch Country Park and housing estate	
Throwley							
Biggin Hill						London Biggin Hill Airport	
Detling							
