= Plymouth City Airport =

Former airport of Plymouth, England, United Kingdom (1925–2011)

- IATA: PLH (Historic); ICAO: EGHD

Summary
- Airport type: Public
- Owner: Plymouth City Council
- Operator: Sutton Harbour Holdings
- Serves: Plymouth
- Location: Plymouth, Devon, England
- Opened: July 1931
- Closed: 23 December 2011
- Operating base for: Brymon Airways
- Built: 1925
- Elevation AMSL: 145 m (476 ft)
- Coordinates: 50°25′22″N 004°06′21″W
- Website: www.suttonharbourholdings.co.uk/about-us/businesses/regeneration/former-plymouth-airport

Map
- Location in Devon

Runways
Direction	Length		Surface
Direction	m	ft	Surface
06/24	805	2,641	Asphalt
13/31	1,160	3,809	Asphalt

Statistics (2009)
- Movements: 19,763
- Passengers: 157,933
- Sources: UK AIP at NATS; Statistics from the UK Civil Aviation Authority

Plymouth City Airport (IATA: PLH, ICAO: EGHD) was an airport located near Roborough, 4 miles (6.4 km) north‑northeast of Plymouth city centre. The airport opened on this site in 1925 and was officially opened by the future king Edward VIII, as Prince of Wales, in 1931.

The airport is owned by Plymouth City Council and leased to Plymouth-based company Sutton Harbour Group under its wholly owned subsidiary Plymouth City Airport Limited that has directors who also have interests / directorships in Newquay Airport. The company have submitted several claims for significant maintenance sums for maintaining the site that appear contrary to the actual activities visible on the property.

In 2009, 157,933 passengers passed through the airport, a sharp increase of 34.0% on the 2008 total of 117,823 making Plymouth one of the few UK airports experiencing significant growth during the period. However, following the withdrawal of London flights in early 2011, the airport's owners said passenger totals had fallen to fewer than 100 a day. The London Stock Exchange was notified on 28 April 2011 that the airport would close by the end of the year.

Plymouth City Airport had a CAA Public Use Aerodrome Licence (Number P687) that allowed flights for the public transport of passengers or for flying instruction, and was part of the Strasser Scheme.

The airport closed and ceased all operations on 23 December 2011. Since that time it has been mothballed with the aviation infrastructure and navigation aids retained pending an attempt by the leaseholder to change the use of the site in planning so that it can be disposed of for residential development.

As result of the announced closure a group from the Plymouth business community initiated a campaign to protect the airport site. The group known as Viable delivered a petition to the city council with more than 38,000 signatures objecting to the Airport closure and asking the council to protect the site.

A full Council debate on the petition concluded with a unanimous vote in support of the airport's retention. There were just two abstentions. Accordingly, in 2014 Plymouth City Council decided to safeguard the site for future general aviation use in the forthcoming Plymouth Plan on the basis of evidence provided in the report on which the council had accepted the airport's closure.

Having achieved its campaign objectives, in 2015 Viable wound up its campaign and created FlyPlymouth Ltd with the objective of acquiring and reopening Plymouth airport. FlyPlymouth proposes to operate Plymouth Airport a general and business aviation airport not relying on commercial passenger services, the withdrawal of which led to the airport's closure.

== History ==
=== Origins ===
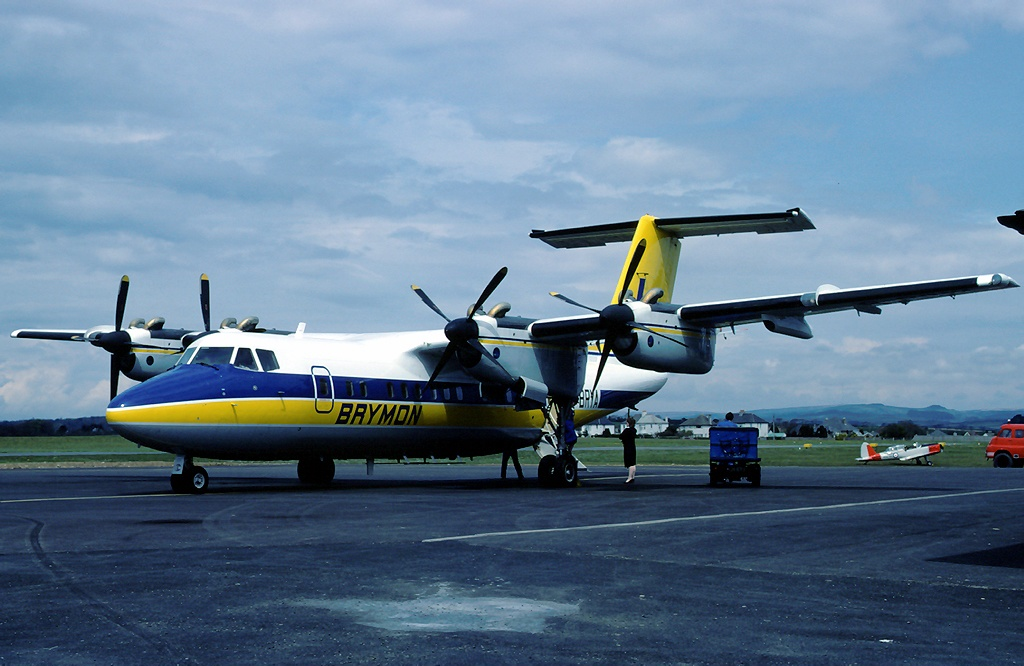
Brymon Airways de Havilland Canada DHC-7 Dash 7 in 1983

In 1923, a mail flight, flown by Alan Cobham, to Croydon carried passengers from a grass strip at Chelson Meadow, Plymouth. Following the flight, Plymouth City Council looked for a permanent site for an airport. In 1925, the airport was moved to Roborough in north Plymouth. The Prince of Wales, later Edward VIII, officially opened the airport in July 1931.

As well as transporting mail and passengers, the airport was used as a bad weather training base for the Royal Air Force as RAF Roborough as well as other services of the armed forces.

Throughout the majority of the Second World War the airport was known as RAF Roborough and was the primary protection over the city of Plymouth, with RAF Harrowbeer as its back-up.

=== Location ===
The airport was located on Plymbridge Lane, PL6 8BW, situated 2 miles north of nearest Dual carriageway the A38 and 4.5 miles north of Plymouth railway station. As late as 2017, some Road signs across the City still had 'Airport' on them, but the majority had been corrected after the airport's closure in 2011.

As the boundary of the city of Plymouth has changed, the named area in which the airport was situated in had changed as well. Originally named at Roborough, the villages of Roborough and Belliver now sit a mile up the A386 from the site. Developments on both sides of the airport in Glenholt and Estover on one side and Southway on the other see the airport site lie in Derriford now, directly opposite from the University of St Mark & St John.

=== Development through the 2000s ===
In September 2007 the airport management announced that the second runway might be sold for industrial and residential development. However, this runway could not be used by commercial airlines. This prompted a response from the city assets manager which indicated a review of the demand for and extent of local interest in a Plymouth City Airport. The end of flights to France together with the added security delays associated with internal air travel when compared with moderately fast road and rail links make Plymouth Airport less attractive than before. Efforts to reinvigorate the support of the local business community met with polite well disposed indifference. Diversion to Newquay is not convenient. The travel on time from London–Gatwick to London Victoria adds considerably to total travel time.

However, despite many local residents sharing the view that these developments represented the 'beginning of the end' for the airport, in October 2007 Air Southwest announced new routes to Dublin, Cork, Chambéry, Glasgow and Newcastle upon Tyne. Sutton Harbour Holdings who owned the airport (and Air Southwest) also investigated the possibility of extending the main runway (13/31) to enable larger aircraft to use the airport and thereby further expand the services provided. Extension of the runway was previously not possible due to a factory (since demolished) located close to the threshold of Runway 31.

Further support for the continued use of the airport came in February 2008 when Air Southwest and the Plymouth Chamber of Commerce & Industry announced the results of an air travel survey aimed at over 200 businesses in Plymouth. The results found that:

- 82% of respondents believe that the air links are important for the economic prosperity of the city
- Only 1/3 of local companies believe Plymouth has good road and rail links to the destinations used for business
- More than half of the businesses questioned use Air Southwest's London Gatwick service on a regular basis

A multimillion-pound airport redevelopment was given the go ahead. The redevelopment will be paid for by selling off the shorter of the two runways to build 375 houses, offices and a 60-bed care home.

== Closure ==
On 24 August 2009, the shorter of the two runways 06/24 was closed. On 1 February 2011, the Air Southwest service to London Gatwick ceased. The council had searched for a new operator, but no successor airline came forward to take over. Consequently, on 28 April 2011, Sutton Harbour Holdings announced that the airport would close by the end of the year.

Pursuant to the terms of its lease, Sutton Harbour Holdings issued a Notice of Non-Viability to the City Council triggering the airport's closure on 12 months' notice. Plymouth City Council commissioned an Economic Study into Air Services for Plymouth from Berkley Hanover. While the study showed that the passenger services had been withdrawn at that time, it noted that the airport could operate with 19 seater aircraft providing passenger services and that it could be profitable as a general aviation airport serving military, business and private customers. The chief executive of the Plymouth Chamber of Commerce urged that the general aviation option be adopted, and at the time several parties were in talks with Sutton Harbour Holdings about running general aviation operations at Plymouth Airport.

On 28 July 2011, the last commercial passenger flights operated from the airport. After this point, and until the end of Air Southwest operations in September 2011, passengers were transported by coach to Newquay.

In August 2011, the City Council accepted the Notice of Non-Viability leading to the airport's closure in December.

The airport was officially closed by the Sutton Harbour Group on 23 December 2011. The last aircraft to fly in and out of the airport was a Mooney M20E flown by the so-called "Flying Preacher" John Holme. He arrived in extreme conditions with 60 mph winds at one point during the approach, but, as forecast, the wind veered in time to make the landing possible.

In October 2011, a group of local businesses formed a group called VIABLE, that aims to re-open the site.

Sutton Harbour Holdings released a study in February 2014 that it said proved the airport remained economically unviable.

In 2014, Plymouth City Council announced that the airport would be safeguarded for future general aviation use in its forthcoming Plymouth Plan and that residential development would not be permitted.

In March 2015, the Chancellor of the Exchequer at the time, George Osborne, stated that he would look at commissioning an independent study into the viability of reopening the airport. Following the Chancellor's announcement, London's Heathrow Airport also announced that they had set aside £10 million within a regional route development plan that would only go ahead on the condition that Plymouth City Airport reopens.

== The airport post-closure ==
=== Jodel controversy ===
On 9 August 2015, a Jodel D.120A light aircraft, registration G-ASXU, was forced to land at Plymouth Airport due to poor weather. The lease-holders, Sutton Harbour Holdings plc, refused to let the aircraft take off from the airport's runway, citing safety concerns, and concrete blocks were placed around the aircraft to prevent it from being moved. The actions of SHH were widely condemned by members of the UK general aviation community, with a "Free the Jodel" campaign being started online. SHH's social media pages were flooded with messages of criticism.

When it was operational, Plymouth City Airport signed up to the Strasser Scheme, which exempts pilots from charges for emergency landings or diversions. Charles Strasser, who initiated the scheme, called the decision "outrageous", and said, "This flies in the face of the spirit of the agreement".

On the morning of 28 August, three weeks after landing, pilot Martin Ferid flew his Jodel out of the former Plymouth Airport site in front of a crowd of onlookers. Ferid claimed before taking off that "a military air base would have treated me better".

SHH PLC said at the time: “We made clear at the time that this was always an issue of safety and therefore the pilot being able to demonstrate that there was acceptable insurance in place."

=== Department for Transport study, December 2016 ===
In December 2016 the Department for Transport published its report entitled "A study of consultancy reports' conclusions on reopening Plymouth City Airport for commercial passenger services". The study brings together and reviews in detail the findings from nine previous reports commissioned by interested parties on the potential viability of renewed commercial passenger services from the former Plymouth City Airport (PCA).

The study concludes that there is no clear and consistent evidence across the reports reviewed to suggest that sufficient demand exists to operate commercially viable passenger services from a reopened PCA. It says passenger estimates were found to be equivalent to or lower than the levels seen prior to PCA's closure, when the airport frequently failed to make a profit. The study says that PCA is subject to a range of supply constraints, namely a relatively short runway that limits the range of aircraft and airlines able to operate from the airport. This in turn limits the number of possible destinations served, restricting demand. The study says that the reviewed reports show a number of commercial risks which would limit the viability of the airport. Therefore, when reviewing any business case which considers resuming commercial passenger services at PCA, the extent to which the proposal provides sufficient evidence that the effects of these risks can be mitigated should be considered.

==== Reaction to Department for Transport study ====
Before the Department for Transport study was published, BBC Spotlight (South West) ran a report on 28 October 2016 saying that the study was expected to conclude that Plymouth City Airport could not operate without substantial public subsidy. A tweet from BBC Radio Cornwall stated: 'New report warns any plans to reopen Plymouth City Airport would require £9m of Govt funding – would you use it?'

A second tweet on the same day from BBC Radio Cornwall stated: 'Campaigners fighting to reopen Plymouth City Airport have admitted £9m of Govt investment would be needed'.

On Sunday 30 October 2016 the BBC's Sunday Politics South West carried a more in-depth story about the findings of the Department for Transport study saying it appeared to suggest Plymouth City Airport is not viable without £9m of public subsidy. The source of the £9m subsidy claim appears to be paragraph 5.20 (pages 71–72) of the DfT report which references a business plan submitted by the campaign group FlyPlymouth to reopen the airport. The report states: FlyPlymouth do not suggest that a reopened PCA under Option 3 will be financially viable in the short term without government subsidy or support, as their business case includes £4 million in government loans (or an alternative) to help cover site 72 acquisition costs, recommissioning costs and initial operational losses. Further to this, the business case assumes that support from the Regional Air Connectivity Fund (RACF), totalling £5 million across the first three loss-making years of commercial passenger operations, will be provided by the Government.

The DfT study was dismissed as a "red herring" by FlyPlymouth when it was published on 16 December 2016. This was because the Report focussed exclusively on the provision of Commercial Passenger Services but ignored the role of General Aviation. Plymouth City Council had safeguarded the airport for General Aviation use, not passenger services.

Tim Jones, Chairman of the Devon and Cornwall Business Council, said: "...it's the wrong type of airport in the wrong location. We have to move on. We can't clutch as straws any more." Conservative MP Johnny Mercer, whose Moor View constituency includes the airport site, said: "The report itself does not appear to paint a positive light for passenger services from Plymouth airport. I recognise this is an emotive subject, but I simply want to see the land used productively to benefit Plymouth. What I believe would be an absolute travesty is the site be aid empty for over 20 years."

Sutton Harbour Holdings published a press release in response to the publication of the DfT report in which Chief Executive Jason Schofield said: "This is a thorough and independent report that has weighed the evidence and concluded that there is no evidence that commercially viable passenger services can be sustained from this site."

In conclusion, the long-awaited study from the Department for Transport study concluded that there was no evidence to suggest that sufficient demand exists to operate commercially viable passenger services and that the relatively short runway limits the range of aircraft and airlines able to operate from the airport.

=== Plym Vale garden suburb plan ===
In February 2017 Sutton Harbour Holdings published plans to redevelop the airport site as a garden suburb called Plym Vale. The company said the £200 million plan would create a new walkable city quarter with village green, playing fields, shops, homes and social enterprise workspace. There would be a veterans' rehabilitation village, multi-sports arena linked to the University of St Mark & St John (Marjon), primary school, community hall and health facilities. The site would include in the region of 1,500 new homes, from starter-homes and social housing, to detached family houses, to supported homes and health facilities for older members of the community. Sutton Harbour Holdings says this would meet up to 10% of Plymouth's local housing need, taking pressure off greenfield sites on the edge of the city and in surrounding towns and villages in West Devon and the South Hams.

Lord Matthew Taylor has been appointed as an independent advisor to the project. Lord Taylor originated the government's new Garden Villages policy and conducted planning policy reviews for the previous two Governments. He is also former chairman of the National Housing Federation, representing 1,100 charitable housing associations across England.

Commenting on the plans, Marjon Acting Vice-Chancellor Dr Karen Cook said: “If there is not to be an airport on the current site, we are fully supportive of the plans for Plym Vale that Sutton Harbour Holdings plc is proposing. The plans bring added value to the city, over and above a standard housing scheme, and would enhance the living and social options for our future students.”

Sutton Harbour Holdings plc said its proposals for Plym Vale will be submitted to Plymouth City Council as part of the council's ongoing consultation into the Plymouth and South West Devon Joint Local Plan, which is due to be considered by a Planning Inspector in the autumn of 2017.

The council is entitled to 75% of the development proceeds from the airport site because it owns the majority of the freehold. Sutton Harbour Holdings has estimated that this would be worth at least £50 million to the council.

The future use of the airport site will be determined by an Examination in Public of the draft Plymouth and South West Devon Joint Local Plan, which is scheduled to take place in the autumn of 2017. In the draft plan, Plymouth City Council currently earmarks the airport site for future General Aviation use. Sutton Harbour Holdings plc is seeking to have the site included in the plan for redevelopment as a garden suburb.

==== Successful development on the site ====
The shorter of the two runways, 06/24, has been partially built on with residential housing and flats, not according to the Plym Vale plan, but instead according to original plans from 2008 indicating that money made would be reinvested into the airport. The roads constructed here are named with the site's aviation history in mind, with Runway Road, Radar Road, Lysander Lane, Albacore Drive, Piper Street, Airborne Drive and Brymon Way.

=== Subsequent developments ===
As of January 2025, the former airport remained unused, with neither the mooted reopening nor any alternative redevelopment proposals having taken place since its closure in 2011. Plymouth City Council were also reported to be taking unspecified legal action in an attempt to regain possession of the site from lessee Sutton Harbour Group.

== Facilities ==
Air Southwest had its management head office at the airport, but announced that 12 jobs would be lost and its Plymouth office would close, moving instead to Humberside Airport, which is the main operations base for Eastern Airways. Its main maintenance base was moved to Newquay early in 2011. When Brymon Airways existed, its head office was in Brymon House within the airport perimeter.

An RAF Chinook was forced to make an emergency landing at Plymouth Airport on 25 November 2011. It was the fifth such landing in ten days. Flag Officer Sea Training (FOST) helicopters will now operate from HMS Raleigh in Cornwall but be based at Newquay.

The airport in its entirety was closed on 23 December 2011 due to the present leaseholders, Sutton Harbour Holdings making a case that the airport was non-viable. As from this date, there was no Air traffic control, no navigation aids, no runway maintenance and no fire cover, with the nearest Devon and Somerset Fire and Rescue Service station being 1.5 miles away in Crownhill. Airport leaseholder Sutton Harbour Holdings went ahead with an auction of the aerodrome's equipment in July 2012. However, the aviation infrastructure and navigational aid equipment remains in place under the terms of the airport lease albeit it in a deteriorated condition.

Concern had been expressed about operation of the Devon Air Ambulance with the closure of the airport as night flights were not possible at the time into the nearby Derriford Hospital.

== Airlines and destinations ==
Air Wales ceased operation in 2006, therefore its Cardiff-to-Plymouth flights were taken over by Air Southwest. No airlines currently operate from Plymouth. Air Southwest pulled out of Plymouth in July 2011 in advance of the airline's closure in September 2011.

== Passenger statistics ==
5 busiest routes to and from Plymouth City Airport (2009)
Rank	Airport	Passengers handled	% Change 2008 / 09
1	London Gatwick	57,516	▼5
2	Glasgow International	24,370	▲42
3	Manchester	24,307	▼26
4	Newcastle	16,772	▲25
5	Jersey	13,434	▼10
Source: UK Civil Aviation Authority
