= Air Southwest =

British regional airline

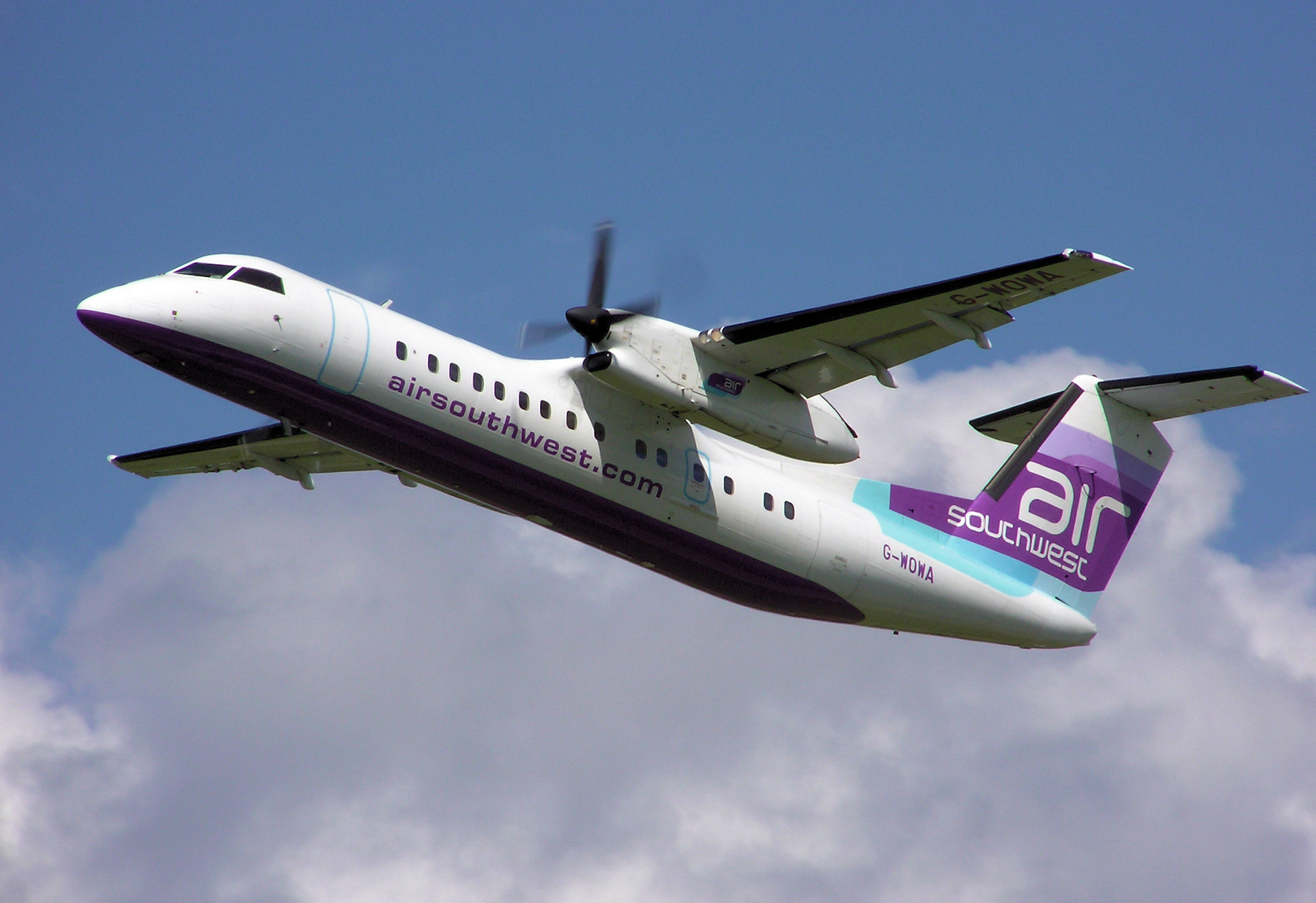
- Bombardier Dash 8-311
IATA	ICAO	Call sign
SZ	WOW	SWALLOW
- Founded: 2003; 23 years ago
- Ceased operations: 30 September 2011; 15 years ago
- Hubs: Plymouth; Newquay; Bristol
- Fleet size: 5
- Destinations: 12
- Headquarters: Plymouth City Airport
- Key people: Peter Davies (CEO); Mike Coombes (MD)

Air Southwest was a British airline founded by Sutton Harbour Holdings in 2003. Ownership was transferred to Eastern Airways in September 2010 but operations ceased 12 months later. It operated regional scheduled passenger services in South West England. Its main base was Plymouth City Airport, with hubs at Newquay Airport and Bristol Airport. The airline employed 145 people and was headed by managing director Peter Davies and Deputy chief executive Mike Coombes.

The company held a United Kingdom Civil Aviation Authority Type A Operating Licence, permitting it to carry passengers, cargo and mail on aircraft with 20 or more seats.

== History ==
=== Launch ===
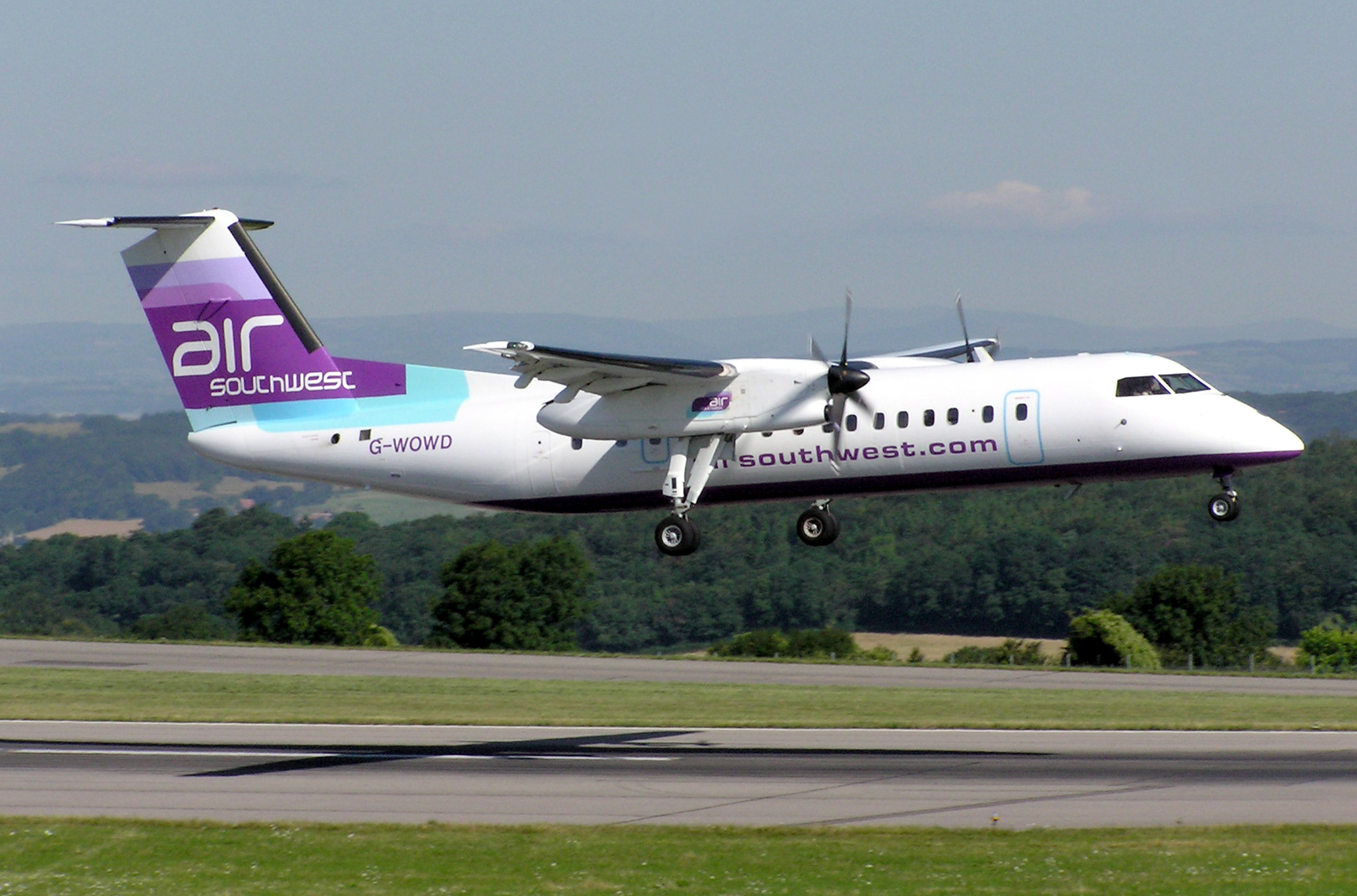
Air Southwest Bombardier Dash 8-311 lands at Bristol Airport, England. (2005)

Air Southwest was established in May 2003 by Sutton Harbour Holdings to fill the void left by the withdrawal of British Airways from South West England. Its first hub was set up at Plymouth City Airport and operations began on 26 October 2003, the day after British Airways withdrew from the market. The initial route was Plymouth-Newquay-London Gatwick. This was soon followed by the introduction of the Plymouth-Bristol-Manchester route which was later extended to Jersey.

=== Expansion ===
On 11 April 2005, the company established a new hub at Newquay, with direct flights to Dublin and flights to Leeds-Bradford via Bristol. At the same time, the airline added a crew base at Newquay, with five cabin crew, ten pilots, and one aircraft.

In April 2006, Air Southwest launched services from Newquay to Manchester via Cardiff, and from Bristol to Norwich (although the airline withdrew from this route in January 2007); in addition a crew and aircraft base was established at Bristol. On 30 October 2006 the airline introduced a fifth daily flight from Newquay to London.

The airline used the low fares, web-based format for bookings with over 90% of all bookings made online. In its first eighteen months of operations Air Southwest carried over 200,000 passengers, increasing the number of passengers flying between Plymouth and Newquay and London Gatwick by 22%. On 25 October 2006, the airline announced that it had carried 750,000 passengers since its launch.

The Bristol to Norwich service ended on 14 January 2007, the airline's first route discontinuation since inception in 2003. Further consolidation was made with the discontinuation of the direct Newquay to Leeds-Bradford service which was routed via Bristol Airport from 16 January 2007, and an increased frequency on the Plymouth to Manchester service to twice daily, via Bristol, from 15 January 2007.

On 24 June 2007 Air Southwest operated its last flights from Cardiff to Newquay and Manchester due to low passenger numbers.

On 29 October 2007 the airline announced an expansion of routes from Plymouth and Newquay, adding flights from Plymouth to Grenoble, Cork, Dublin, Glasgow and Newcastle, and from Newquay to Grenoble, Glasgow and Newcastle. These new routes commenced on 28 April 2008 with the exception of Grenoble which followed on 20 December 2008.

During the summer of 2009 Air Southwest operated a charter on behalf of C.I. Travel. The operation saw the introduction of commercial flights between Oxford and Jersey every Saturday.

On 2 February 2009 the airline announced an expansion of its services between Plymouth and the Channel Islands with the introduction of a service to Guernsey which started on 8 April 2009.

Consolidation of their services to London came when, on 9 March 2009, Air Southwest announced the launch of flights between Plymouth, Newquay and London City Airport. The flights started on 20 April, but the service failed to attract enough passengers and ceased in May 2010

In May 2009 the airline underwent a rebrand to broaden their target audience and increase their market presence. A new slogan of "Fly Britain's Local Airline" was adopted and supported by a television commercial on regional channels, a revamped website and a nationwide advertising campaign.

Another improvement to the services offered came into effect on 31 May 2009 when the airline adopted the IATA code SZ. This has created a number of opportunities for future development such as the introduction of interline agreements/codeshare with other airlines and the possibility of using third parties such as travel agents for ticket sales.

The airline announced the suspension of services from Newquay and Plymouth to London Gatwick from 1 February 2011.

=== Strategic alliance with Eastern Airways ===
An alliance with UK regional carrier Eastern Airways was announced on 25 February 2010. As a result of the alliance Air Southwest joined a Global Distribution System (GDS) enabled them to sell tickets through a number of external sources like travel agents and increase their market presence. It also paved the way for the introduction of codeshare agreements between the two airlines.

=== Sale ===
In May 2010, Sutton Harbour Holdings, the parent company of Air Southwest, announced that the airline was to be sold to enable the company to "resource activities more effectively". Following a drop in profits by £600,000, the airline was sold to Humberside Airport-based Eastern Airways in September 2010. On 1 December 2010, the sale was completed to Eastern Airways.

=== Closure ===
Air Southwest announced on 14 July 2011 that they would cease operations on 30 September 2011. Air Southwest ceased operations at Plymouth on 28 July 2011. Flights to Glasgow, Guernsey, Jersey and Manchester ended on 14 September whilst the remaining flights to Aberdeen, Bristol, Cork, Dublin and Leeds Bradford ended on 30 September. The airline said the closure was due to low demand on routes making them financially unviable. The leases of Air Southwest's three remaining aircraft were transferred to Eastern Airways on 4 July 2011. All the assets were taken over by Eastern Airways. This caused Plymouth Airport to close on 23 December 2011.

== Service ==
Originally, Air Southwest operated a buy-on-board service, which provided passengers with a variety of snacks and drinks available for purchase.

On 10 March 2010 however, they started offering complimentary refreshments on all flights. On morning departures, passengers had a choice of a sweet or savoury snack along with a hot or cold beverage, and a complimentary bar service was offered on departures after 1pm. Other product enhancements included the introduction of a hot towel service, along with a boiled sweet pre-departure.

Passengers were given allocated seating when they checked in. A 20-minute minimum check-in time was introduced for all passengers travelling from Plymouth and Newquay with hand luggage only.

The airline offered a premium service called Advantage. This service offered the following benefits:

- Free changes to booking up to two hours before flight departure
- Business lounge access
- Provided lotion (for women and men)
- Fast track security
- Free on-board refreshments
- Increased baggage allowance of 30 kg

== Destinations ==
Air Southwest served the following destinations throughout its operations:

^{[Base]}	Base
^{[Seasonal]}	Seasonal service

City	IATA	ICAO	Airport
Aberdeen	ABZ	EGPD	Aberdeen Airport
Bristol	BRS	EGGD	Bristol Airport ^{[Base]}
Cardiff	CWL	EGFF	Cardiff Airport
Cork	ORK	EICK	Cork Airport
Dublin	DUB	EIDW	Dublin Airport
Dundee	DND	EGPN	Dundee Airport ^{[Seasonal]}
Glasgow	GLA	EGPF	Glasgow International Airport
Guernsey	GCI	EGJB	Guernsey Airport
Jersey	JER	EGJJ	Jersey Airport
Leeds/Bradford	LBA	EGNM	Leeds Bradford International Airport
Manchester	MAN	EGCC	Manchester Airport
Newquay	NQY	EGHQ	Newquay Airport ^{[Base]}
Norwich	NWI	EGSH	Norwich Airport
Plymouth	PLH	EGHD	Plymouth City Airport ^{[Base]}

== In popular culture ==
The opening scene of ITV1 drama Doc Martin featured one of the airline's Bombardier Dash 8-311 planes flying over the Cornish coast. Martin Clunes playing the title character (Doc. Martin Ellingham) and Caroline Catz (as Louisa Glasson) were also in a scene onboard the aircraft.

== See also ==
- List of defunct airlines of the United Kingdom
