= RAF Kirmington =

Former RAF station in Lincolnshire, England

RAF Kirmington
- Kirmington, Lincolnshire in England
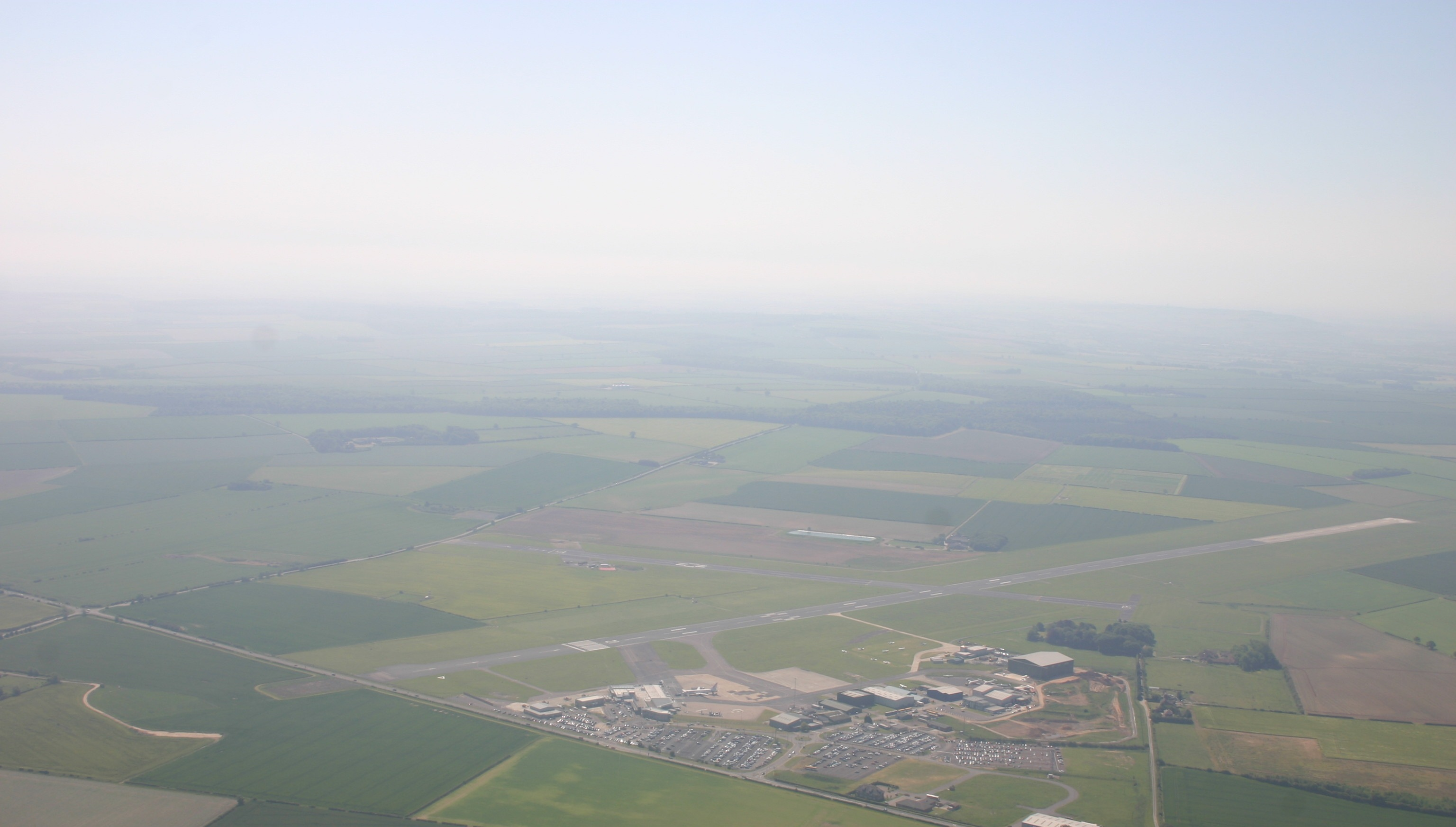
- Humberside International Airport

Site information
- Type: Royal Air Force satellite station 13 Base substation 1943–46
- Code: KG
- Owner: Air Ministry
- Operator: Royal Air Force
- Controlled by: RAF Bomber Command * No. 1 Group RAF

Location
- Shown within Lincolnshire RAF Kirmington (the United Kingdom)
- Coordinates: 53°34′40″N 000°20′39″W

Site history
- Built: 1942
- In use: October 1942 - 1953
- Battles/wars: European theatre of World War II

Airfield information
- Identifiers: IATA: HUY, ICAO: EGNJ
- Elevation: 26 metres (85 ft) AMSL
Runways
| Direction | Length and surface |
|---|---|
| 00/00 | Concrete/Tarmac |
| 00/00 | Concrete/Tarmac |
| 00/00 | Concrete/Tarmac |

Royal Air Force Kirmington or more simply RAF Kirmington is a former Royal Air Force satellite station located 6.2 miles (10.0 km) north east of Brigg, Lincolnshire and 11 miles (18 km) south west of Grimsby, Lincolnshire, England.

In 1970, the airfield was redeveloped as the civilian Humberside Airport.

== History ==
=== Second World War ===
It took its name from the village of Kirmington nearby; the most notable squadron posted there was No. 166 Squadron RAF and a memorial plaque to the members of that unit is in the parish church. The airfield opened in January 1942

| Squadron | Equipment | From | To | Notes |
|---|---|---|---|---|
| No. 142 Squadron RAF | Vickers Wellington III/X | 19 December 1942 | 19 December 1942 | Disbanded |
| No. 150 Squadron RAF | Wellington IC and III | October 1942 | 19 December 1942 | Blida, Algeria |
| No. 153 Squadron RAF | Avro Lancaster BI/BIII | 7 October 1944 | 15 October 1944 | RAF Scampton Reformed here. |
| No. 166 Squadron RAF | Wellington III/X | 27 January 1943 | February 1943 | Disbanded |
| No. 166 Squadron RAF | Lancaster BI/BIII | September 1943 | 18 November 1945 | Disbanded |

The site was also used by No. 15 (Pilots) Advanced Flying Unit as a Relief Landing Ground between March and October 1942.

=== Post 1945 ===
From February 1946 the station was put on care and maintenance until relinquished by the Air Ministry to the Ministry of Agriculture in 1953.

== Current use ==
In 1970, after changing hands several times, Kirmington was selected as the best location for a regional airport serving the Hull, Grimsby and Scunthorpe localities and has become Humberside Airport.
