= RAF Roborough =

Former Royal Air Force Base in Devon, England (1931–1950)

RAF Roborough RNAS Roborough
- Roborough Aerodrome
- Near Roborough, Devon in England

Site information
- Type: Royal Air Force station
- Owner: Admiralty; Air Ministry
- Operator: Royal Navy; Royal Air Force
- Controlled by: Fleet Air Arm; RAF Fighter Command 1940-41 * No. 10 Group RAF
- Condition: Disused

Location
- Shown within Devon RAF Roborough (the United Kingdom)
- Coordinates: 50°25′20″N 004°06′32″W

Site history
- Built: 1931
- In use: July 1931 - 1950
- Fate: Civil aviation
- Battles/wars: European theatre of World War II

Airfield information
- Elevation: 488 feet (149 m) AMSL
Runways
Direction	Length and surface
S/N	800 yards (732 m) x 100 yards (91 m) Grass
NE/SW	900 yards (823 m) x 100 yards (91 m) Grass
SE/NW	600 yards (549 m) x 100 yards (91 m) Grass

Royal Air Force Roborough or more simply RAF Roborough was a Royal Air Force station in Roborough located 3.8 miles (6.1 km) north of Plymouth, Devon, which used Plymouth City Airport as their base.

== History ==
RAF Roborough began when the Air Ministry started to use Plymouth City Airport for exercises between the RAF, Royal Navy and the British Army. The Royal Navy started to use the airport in the late 1930s and was renamed RNAS Roborough however on 1 May 1942 the site was taken over by the Air Ministry for Royal Air Force use primarily for RAF Coastal Command.

=== RNAS Roborough ===
The Admiralty used the airfield for various duties also the airfield played an important role during the Battle of Britain coming under partial control of the No. 10 Group RAF headquarters at RAF Box and had RAF Middle Wallop as their sector station. The first squadron to use the airfield was No. 247 Squadron RAF between 1 August 1940 and 10 February 1941 flying the Gloster Gladiator II before moving to RAF St Eval on 10 February 1941 however after seven days the squadron moved back to Roborough flying the Hawker Hurricane I before moving out for the last time on 10 May 1941 when the squadron went to RAF Portreath.

- Air Sea Rescue Flight RAF, Roborough (1941)

=== RAF Roborough ===
In 1942 the site was taken over by the Royal Air Force for Coastal Command Duties with No. 691 Squadron RAF forming at the airfield on 1 December 1943 flying Hurricane I's, Boulton Paul Defiant I's, Airspeed Oxford I's and Fairey Barracuda II's before leaving on 21 February 1945 moving to RAF Harrowbeer.

== Units ==
The following squadrons were here at some point:

- No. 16 Squadron RAF
- No. 225 Squadron RAF
- No. 276 Squadron RAF
- 801 Naval Air Squadron
- 810 Naval Air Squadron
- 814 Naval Air Squadron
- 815 Naval Air Squadron
- 819 Naval Air Squadron

The following units were also here at some point:

- 'C' Flight of No. 2 Anti-Aircraft Co-operation Unit RAF
- No. 15 Group Communication Flight RAF
- No. 19 Group Communication Flight RAF
- No. 46 Elementary and Reserve Flying Training School RAF
- No. 82 Gliding School RAF
- No. 1623 (Anti-Aircraft Co-operation) Flight RAF

== Later use ==
In the 1950s the Royal Air Force left and the site became Plymouth City Airport, which in turn was shut down for good in 2011.

== See also ==
- List of air stations of the Royal Navy
- List of former Royal Air Force stations
- RAF Fighter Command Order of Battle 1940
