= Roborough, South Hams =

Village in Devon, England

Coordinates: 50°26′26″N 4°6′30″W

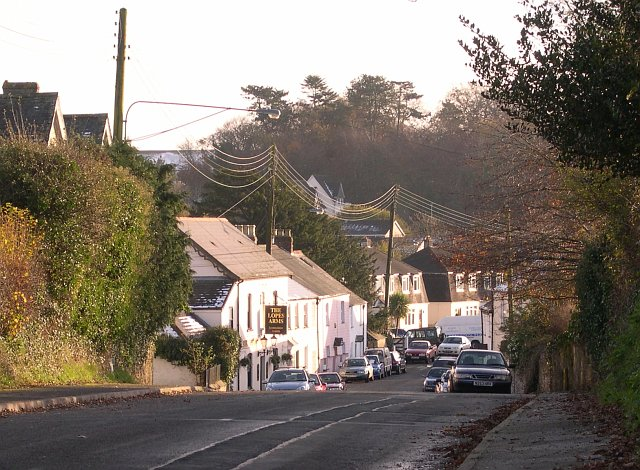
The main village street of Roborough

Roborough is a village in the South Hams of Devon, England. Former home of Plymouth City Airport (and formerly to RAF Roborough), Roborough lies just outside the northern boundary of the city of Plymouth on the main road to Tavistock, and is a popular dormitory village.

The Lopes family, descendants of Jamaican-born Tory Member of Parliament and Baronet of Sephardic-Jewish Portuguese origin Sir Manasseh Masseh Lopes, 1st Baronet, lived in Roborough and acquired the title Baron Roborough in the twentieth century, after moving from nearby Maristow House on the River Tavy and before relocating to Gnaton, a smaller mansion on the coast near Noss Mayo. The very old village pub, which stands on the main street (long since bypassed by a modern dual carriageway) is called the Lopes Arms.

One important son of Roborough is shoemaker and early trade unionist George Odger. After travelling to London in search of work, George became the first trades-unionist to stand for Parliament, the leader of the London Trades Council and the president of the First International Workingmen's Association, an historically important organisation of socialist, communist, anarchist and working-class activists in which Karl Marx played a prominent role.

The Plymouth Argaum Rugby Club grounds are just east of the village.

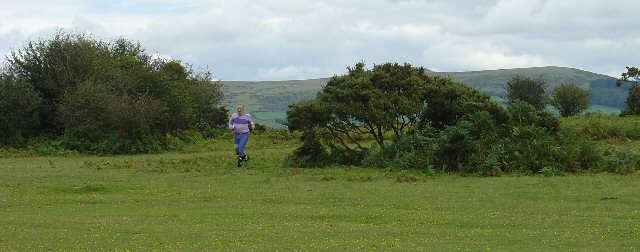
Part of Roborough Down, with the main bulk of Dartmoor behind

Roborough Down is the name given to the long stretch of undulating moorland over which the road to Yelverton and Tavistock passes. It lies within Dartmoor National Park, but is owned by Lord Roborough's Maristow Estate. The down has a rich array of wildlife such as ravens, buzzards, foxes, deer and semi-wild ponies and its vegetation consists of pasture, gorse and bracken with frequent stands of hawthorn, oak and birch. However, the down's unique wildlife and environment is threatened by increasing deforestation and grazing pressure.
