= Strasser Scheme =

British initiative

Strasser Scheme is a British initiative to waive landing fees payable by general aviation aircraft for landings resulting from genuine emergencies, diversions and precautionary procedures.

A review of fatal accidents in general aviation, published by the CAA in 1997, concluded that the costs incurred by a pilot in case of a diversion were a contributing factor in their decision to continue a flight despite safety concerns. The landing fees for a light aircraft can be as high as £1047, and were typically payable in full regardless of the circumstances of the landing prior to the adoption of this scheme.

As of January 2022, only four airports remain which refuse to join the scheme, of 212 airports approached. These are: Bournemouth Airport, Lydd Airport, London Luton Airport and Manchester Airport. Additionally, Stansted Airport, a former participant, seems to have ceased their participation.

Furthermore, Heathrow Airport, London City Airport and Gatwick Airport were never asked to, and did not ever, join the scheme.
