= No. 166 Squadron RAF =

Defunct flying squadron of the Royal Air Force

- No. 166 Sqn badge
- Active: 1918-1919; 1936-1940; 1943-1945
- Country: United Kingdom
- Branch: Royal Air Force
- Motto: Tenacity

No. 166 Squadron RAF was a Royal Air Force squadron that formed just before the end of World War I. It was the first and one of only three to be equipped with the Handley Page V/1500 heavy bomber.

== History ==
The squadron was formed on 13 June 1918 at RAF Bircham Newton as the first squadron to be equipped with the Handley Page V/1500 heavy bomber. Designed for the long-range bombing role and particularly for raids on Berlin the squadron worked up with training on long-range navigation. It had three aircraft ready for the first operation but with the Armistice was not flown operationally. It continued to train but the RAF had decided to use the Vickers Vimy in the long-range bombing role so the squadron was disbanded.

The squadron was re-formed on 1 November 1936 at RAF Boscombe Down from B Flight of 97 Squadron with the Handley Page Heyford III heavy bomber. Within a few months it had moved into the newly opened RAF Leconfield in Yorkshire. The Heyfords were eventually replaced with the Armstrong Whitworth Whitley in June 1939. The squadron was not used for operations but became a training squadron to prepare crews for front-line service. With the start of the war the squadron moved to RAF Abingdon and it was disbanded on 6 April 1940 when it was absorbed into No. 10 Operational Training Unit.

142 Sqn and 150 Sqn were sent to North Africa but had enough surplus crews and equipment left behind at RAF Kirmington that they were re-formed on 27 January 1943 as No. 166 Squadron equipped with the Vickers Wellington. It did not wait to see action and two-days after forming, on 29 January, the squadron was part of raid on Lorient. It flew regularly night sorties as part of No. 1 Group Bomber Command and converted to the Avro Lancaster in September 1943. At the start of 1945 with a slow down in operation the squadron flew both day and night sorties but with the end of the war the squadron was disbanded, still at Kirmington, on 18 November 1945.

== Aircraft operated ==
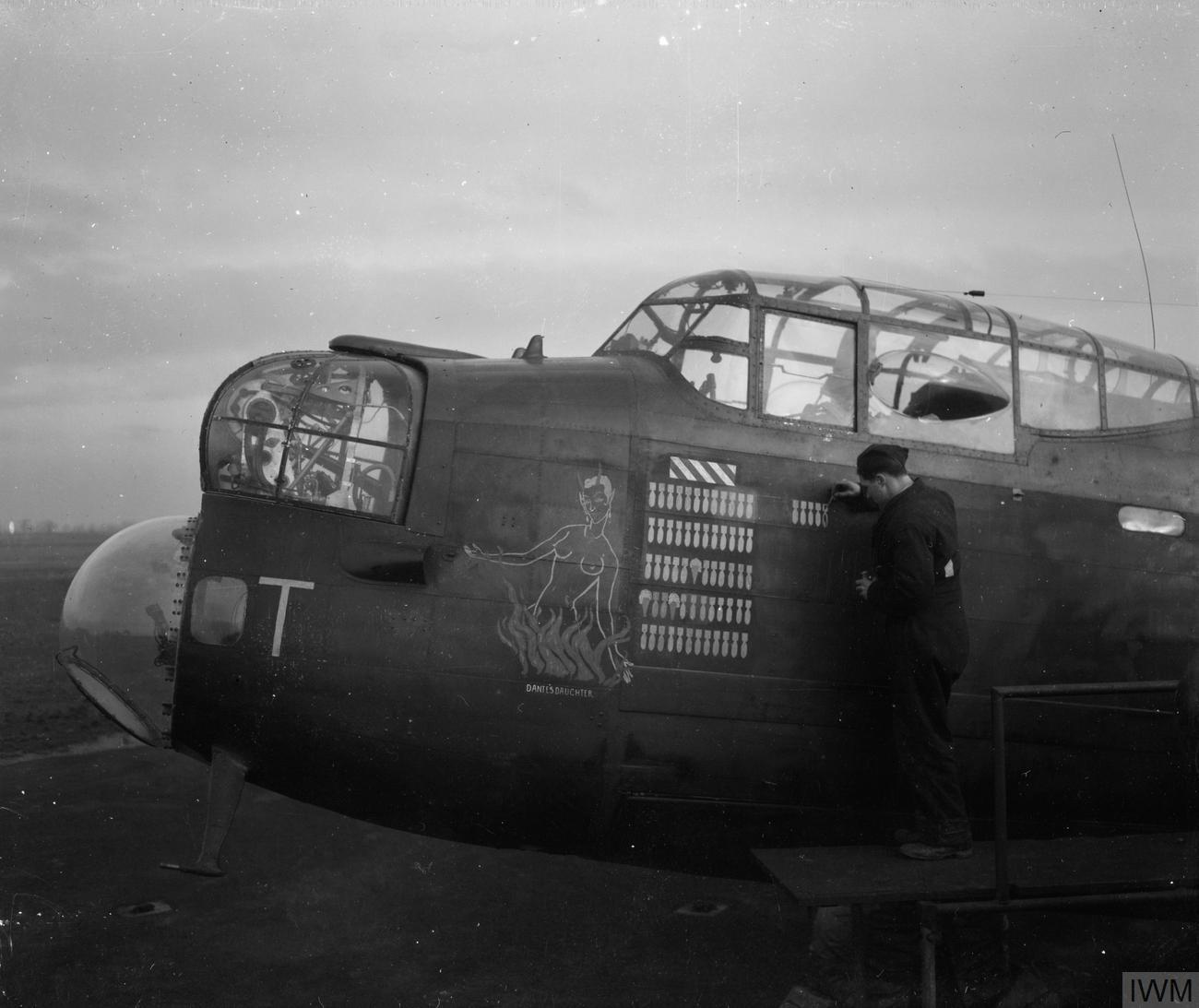
166 Squadron Lancaster "Dante's Daughter" at RAF Kirmington, February 1944

Aircraft operated (All data from Jefford (1988) unless indicated.)
Dates	Aircraft	Variant	Notes
1918	Royal Aircraft Factory F.E.2		Biplane fighter
1918	Handley Page V/1500		Biplane heavy bomber
1936-1939	Handley Page Heyford	III	Biplane heavy bomber
1939-1940	Armstrong Whitworth Whitley	I and III	Twin-engined medium bomber
1943	Vickers Wellington	III and X	Twin-engined medium bomber
1943-1945	Avro Lancaster	I and III	Four-engined heavy bomber

== Notes ==
=== References ===
- Jefford, C. G. (1988). RAF Squadrons: A Comprehensive Record of the Movement & Equipment of All RAF Squadrons. Airlife Publishing. ISBN 1-85310-053-6.
- The Illustrated Encyclopedia of Aircraft (Part Work 1982–1985). London: Orbis Publishing. 1985. OCLC 932622280.
