= Humberside Airport =

International airport in North Lincolnshire, England

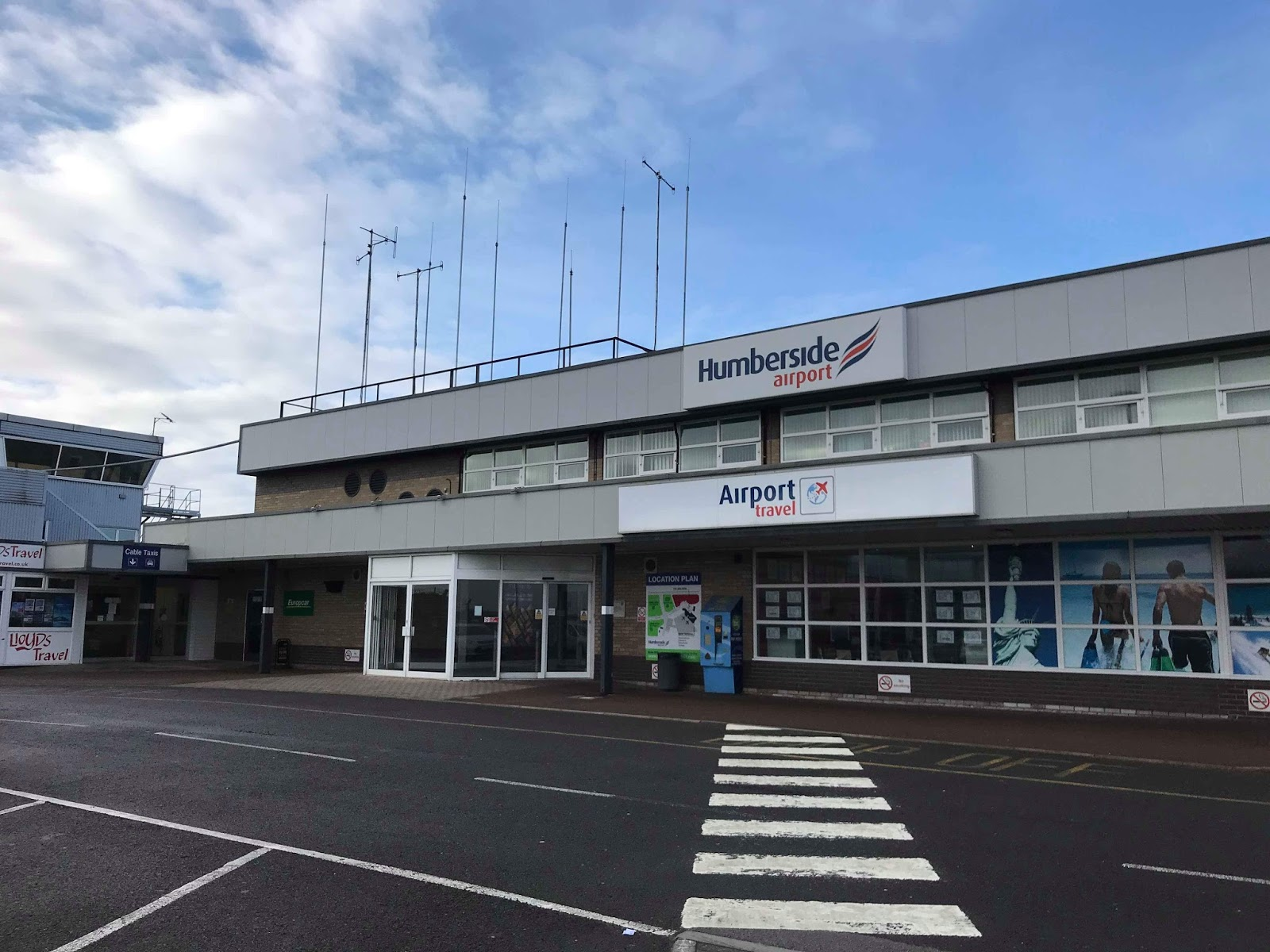
- IATA: HUY; ICAO: EGNJ

Summary
- Airport type: Public
- Owner: Bristow Helicopters
- Operator: Humberside International Airport Ltd.
- Serves: Lincolnshire, East Riding of Yorkshire and Kingston upon Hull
- Location: Kirmington, Lincolnshire
- Elevation AMSL: 121 ft (37 m)
- Coordinates: 53°34′28″N 000°21′03″W
- Website: www.humbersideairport.com

Map
- Location in Lincolnshire EGNJ (England)

Runways
Direction	Length		Surface
Direction	m	ft	Surface
02/20	2,196	7,205	Asphalt & concrete
08/26	860	2,822	Asphalt

Statistics (2024)
- Passengers: 150,615
- Passenger change 23–24: ▲10.0%
- Aircraft movements: 18,280
- Movements change 23–24: ▲9.6%
- Sources: UK AIP at NATS; Statistics from the UK Civil Aviation Authority

Humberside Airport (IATA: HUY, ICAO: EGNJ) is an international airport at Kirmington in North Lincolnshire, England, 10 NM (19 km; 12 mi) from Grimsby (east), Hull (north) and Scunthorpe (west). It is also 28 miles (45 kilometres) from Lincoln, the county's largest city.

Built during World War II as RAF Kirmington, the airfield was developed as a civilian airport in 1973. It was owned by Manchester Airports Group from 1999 until 1 August 2012, when it was sold to the Eastern Group of companies. North Lincolnshire Council retains a minority of shares in the airport. The airport's majority owner is Bristow Helicopters.

== History ==
The airport was previously a Royal Air Force base, RAF Kirmington, opened in 1941 during the Second World War, from which No. 166 Squadron RAF operated the Avro Lancaster. The airfield was closed after the war in 1945, and lay unused as an airfield until 1973 when the local council decided to establish an airport at the site. Work included resurfacing the runways, installing lighting, construction of a new designated terminal building and the building of a taxiway. In 1974, construction finished and the site re-opened as Kirmington Airport. The first commercial flight took place in 1975 to Amsterdam. When the local area was renamed Humberside following local government re-organisation in England, the name was changed to Humberside Airport.

The main runway, designated 03/21 (since redesignated 02/20) was extended to its current length in 1992, allowing operation of much larger aircraft. In the 1990s, the Concorde landed and took off at the airport on several occasions.

In 2008, MAG, the owners at that time, announced that it was conducting a review of its strategy for Humberside Airport, and all options including disposal were under consideration. Initially it announced plans to sell Humberside Airport after nine years of ownership. In December 2008, MAG announced it intended to retain Humberside Airport, due to a number of investments, such as the new £1.6 million perishables hub, coupled with a surge in passenger numbers and little interest from potential bidders. MAG sold its 83.7% share of Humberside in 2012 for £2.3 million to Eastern Group to focus on the larger airports in its portfolio. It was later revealed that MAG had bought the airport for almost £8 million more in 1999. Bristow Helicopters sold Eastern Airways in 2019, but retained its majority share of Humberside Airport.

== Operations ==
The airport faces competition for flights from East Midlands Airport (70 mi or 110 km), and Leeds Bradford Airport (74 mi or 119 km); all of which, at 2026, have a much wider range of scheduled passenger flights. Passengers at the airport peaked in the early to mid-2000s when the facility was used by around 500,000 per year. This fell to around 200,000 passengers in 2016.

In October 2013, SAS Group began daily operations to Copenhagen, only to withdraw the service in April 2014 because of low passenger numbers. However, Sun Air launched twice-weekly flights to Aalborg and Billund in April 2016, in order to support the off-shore wind industry in the Humber and Jutland locations. These flights were also suspended in December 2016.

The airport is also used to service the offshore gas storage and drilling operations for BP and Centrica Storage with over 5,000 air transport helicopter movements in 2016, the fourth highest in the UK. On 3 January 2013 it was reported that Bond Offshore Helicopters had been awarded a contract with Perenco and would start operating flights to Perenco's platforms in the Southern North Sea. This now means that the airport has three of the biggest UK helicopter operators based at the airport.

From 1 April 2015, Bristow Helicopters commenced operations from a new UK Search and Rescue base at Humberside. In October 2016 Bristow Helicopters and Bond (now Babcock) moved their offshore operations to Norwich, leaving CHC and UNI-FLY as the remaining helicopter companies based at Humberside. CHC was scheduled to commence a new contract for Ørsted (formerly DONG Energy) in April 2018, supporting North Sea wind farm construction.

Humberside has one of the highest NEQ approval levels of any airport in Europe, and saw significant growth in cargo throughput from 144 tonnes in 2007 to 1,132 tonnes in 2011. This was due to regular flights by Icelandair Cargo, however these ceased to operate in 2012 and cargo had reduced to 123 tonnes in 2016.

Humberside International has a CAA Public Use Aerodrome Licence (Number P739) that allows flights for the public transport of passengers or for flying instruction. It has an amount of general aviation activity, with five resident flying clubs and organisations offering fixed wing and rotary training. In May 2011, Weston Aviation opened a fixed-base operation (FBO). This was the first dedicated FBO at the airport, where the company has also opened a regional charter sales office, to promote and develop the use of business and private aviation in Yorkshire and the Humber.

== Airlines and destinations ==
The following airlines operate regular scheduled flights to and from Humberside:

Airlines	Destinations
Enter Air	Seasonal: Enontekiö Airport
KLM	Amsterdam
TUI Airways	Seasonal: Palma de Mallorca

== Statistics ==
=== Passengers and movements ===
Humberside Airport passenger totals 2000-2024 (thousands)

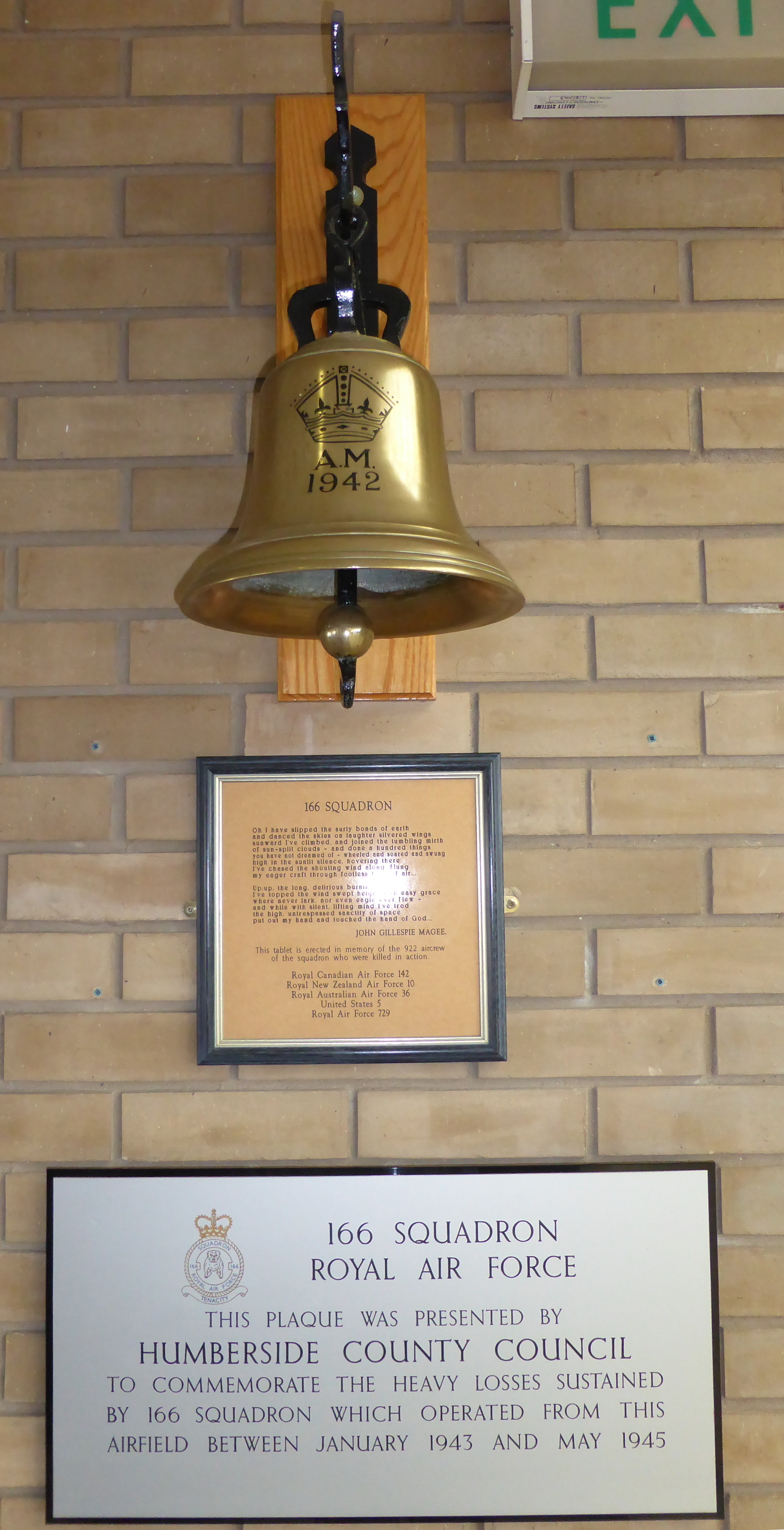
The memorial to 166 squadron at the door of the modern airport terminal

Traffic data (2000–2024)
Year	Passengers	Aircraft movements	Cargo (tonnes)
2000	447,738	38,894	130
2001	435,473	39,858	157
2002	492,433	42,361	126
2003	517,692	39,318	945
2004	531,277	38,455	752
2005	460,930	36,839	114
2006	520,956	37,545	144
2007	468,522	38,797	144
2008	427,669	37,758	168
2009	336,649	35,060	241
2010	283,191	32,813	600
2011	274,609	26,599	1,132
2012	234,142	25,636	621
2013	236,083	27,178	153
2014	239,173	27,647	129
2015	221,203	25,665	148
2016	201,650	22,744	123
2017	190,936	18,282	93
2018	192,526	18,759	121
2019	204,463	18,228	117
2020	45,273	10,347	52
2021	31,534	11,973	84
2022	92,465	13,103	74
2023	136,976	16,678	62
2024	150,615	18,280	64

=== Routes ===
Busiest routes to and from Humberside (2025)
Rank	Airport	Total passengers	Change 2024 / 25
1	Amsterdam	121,880	▲16.3%
2	Palma de Mallorca	18,426	▲103.0%
3	Aberdeen	6,661	▼33.0%

== Ground transport ==
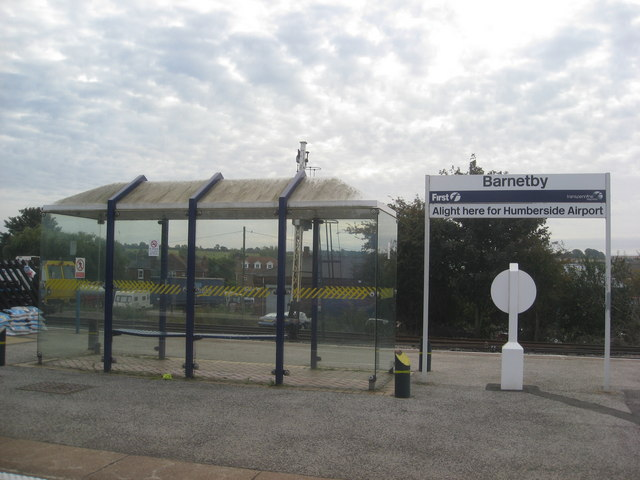
Barnetby station with "Alight here for Humberside Airport" signage

=== Bus ===
Hornsby's Bus and Coach run a two-hourly service to the village of Kirmington, whilst stopping within airport grounds each way (Monday–Friday). Hornsby's also runs a service every two hours on a Saturday from Kirmington to Brigg and further on to Kirton in Lindsey.

=== Rail ===
The airport lies close to the South Humberside Main Line, which runs between Doncaster and the coast at Grimsby and Cleethorpes, running a few hundred metres to the north of the terminal. There is no stop on the line at this point and passengers must alight at Barnetby railway station, 2 1/2 miles (4.0 km) to the west of the airport, or proceed to Grimsby or Hull and use the bus service. As of May 2022, a bus service operates from Scunthorpe calling at the surrounding villages (including Barnetby) and terminates at nearby Kirmington. The bus service runs on a two-hourly frequency and calls at Humberside Airport. However, the bus does not call at Barnetby railway station, so passengers must walk a short distance to the nearby bus stop on Kings Road.

== Other facilities ==
The airline Eastern Airways has its head office in the Schiphol House on the airport property. Links Air was based at the airport, but moved to Doncaster Sheffield Airport in 2014.

BAE Systems opened an aircraft maintenance academy at the airport in the autumn of 2015. It is a partnership with the Resource Group and is known as the R J Mitchell Academy, after the designer of the Spitfire aircraft.

In 2010 a temporary hotel was erected for the use by the gas and oil rig workers. However, this operation is not designed or licensed to operate as accommodation for normal passengers. This is a temporary structure run by Nightel, a locally based niche business. There was a plan to build a permanent structure in the next five years once demand for the facility had been confirmed. A new 100 bedroom hotel, operating under the Hampton by Hilton brand, opened next to Nightel in July 2017.

== Accidents and incidents ==
9 October 2013 – The passenger of Cessna 172 G-BCYR made a successful emergency landing at Humberside following the death of its pilot in flight. The passenger had no flying experience and was talked down by flying instructors. He had been on a local flight from Sandtoft Airfield, Lincolnshire when the pilot died. The incident formed the basis of a documentary broadcast in the United Kingdom by Channel 4 on 27 March 2014.
