= Kirmington =

Village in North Lincolnshire, England

Coordinates: 53.583035°N 0.333705°W

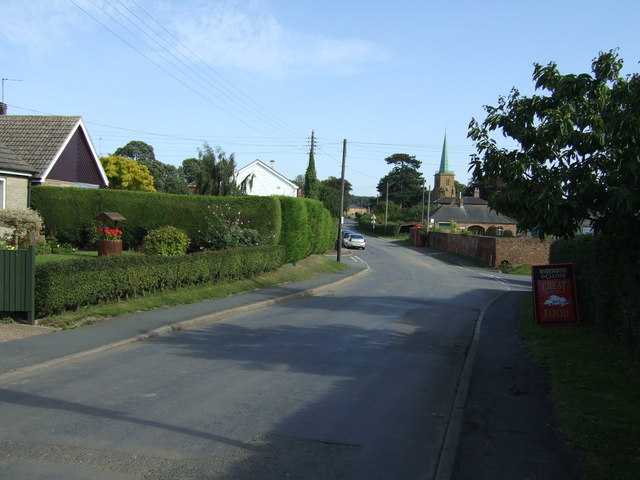
- Kirmington high street

- Location within Lincolnshire
- Population: 365 (Including Croxton 2011)
- OS grid reference: TA104108
  - London: 145 mi (233 km) S
- Civil parish: Kirmington
- Unitary authority: North Lincolnshire
- Ceremonial county: Lincolnshire
- Region: Yorkshire and the Humber
- Country: England
- Sovereign state: United Kingdom
- Post town: Ulceby
- Postcode district: DN39
- Police: Humberside
- Fire: Humberside
- Ambulance: East Midlands
- UK Parliament: Brigg and Immingham

Kirmington is a village in North Lincolnshire, England. It is part of the civil parish of Kirmington and Croxton. From the 2011 census the village became a civil parish in its own name. Kirmington is situated just north from the A18 road, 5 miles (8 km) west from Immingham and 7 miles (11 km) east from Brigg. Less than 1 mile (1.6 km) to the west is Humberside International Airport, the former Second World War station, RAF Kirmington.

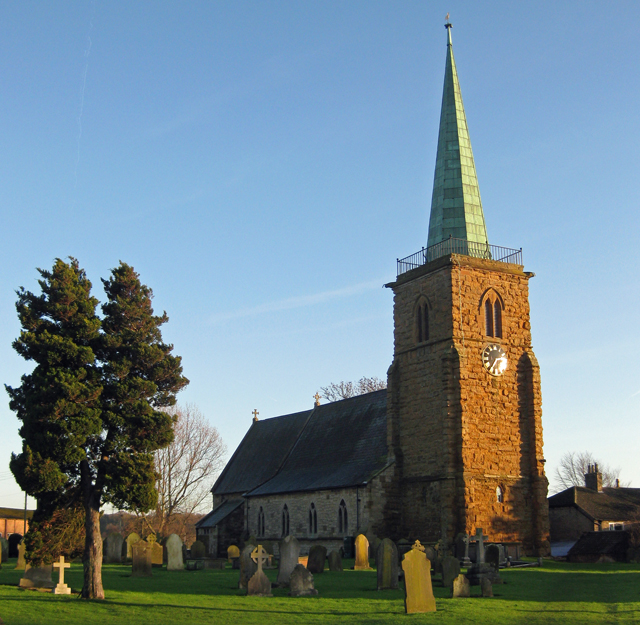
St Helen's Church, Kirmington

Kirmington's recorded population in the 2001 Census was 337, increasing to 365 in the 2011 Census.

The village Grade II* listed Anglican church is dedicated to St Helena. The church is in Perpendicular and Decorated style, with chancel nave and vestry, and a 12th-century tower. In 1838 a wooden spire covered in copper was added.

The church was restored in 1859 by Samuel Sanders Teulon, who rebuilt both aisles and re-roofed the nave. St Helena's is part of the Brocklesby Park Group of the Deanery of Yarborough. St Helena was the mother of the Roman Emperor Constantine.

A Wesleyan Methodist chapel was built in 1835, rebuilt in 1885, and was closed in 1976.

The village school is Kirmington St Helena's Church of England Primary school, built in the 19th century, and extended, with additional facilities for pre-school children, in 2007.

Kirmington is twinned with Terbregge, in the Netherlands. This relationship commemorates Operation Manna, in which planes from RAF Kirmington dropped 3,000 food parcels in April and May 1945.

== Humberside Airport ==
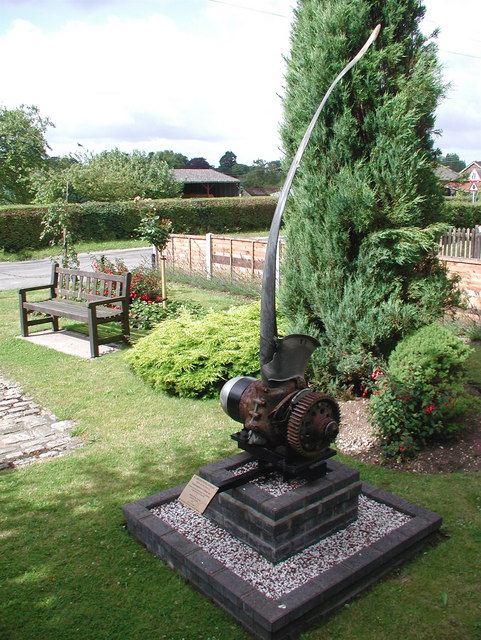
A fragment of Lancaster ND-913 A4-M2 of 115 Squadron, Witchford, as a 166 Squadron memorial in the churchyard.

RAF Kirmington was a Class A airfield of the Second World War. Construction began in 1941, and the airfield was opened for use by Bomber Command in summer 1942.

Closed in 1953, it was used for agricultural flying until being converted for commercial use by Lindsey County Council. Kirmington Transport cafe was built there, on the left side of the road as you left Kirmington - where the airport is today (2024) and run by Thomas Andrew of Barton-upon-Humber in the 1960s and early 1970s until it was bought to build the airport there. It opened as Humberside Airport in March 1974.

Eastern Airways has its head office, Schiphol House, at Humberside Airport.
