= Eastern Airways =

UK regional airline, 1997–2025

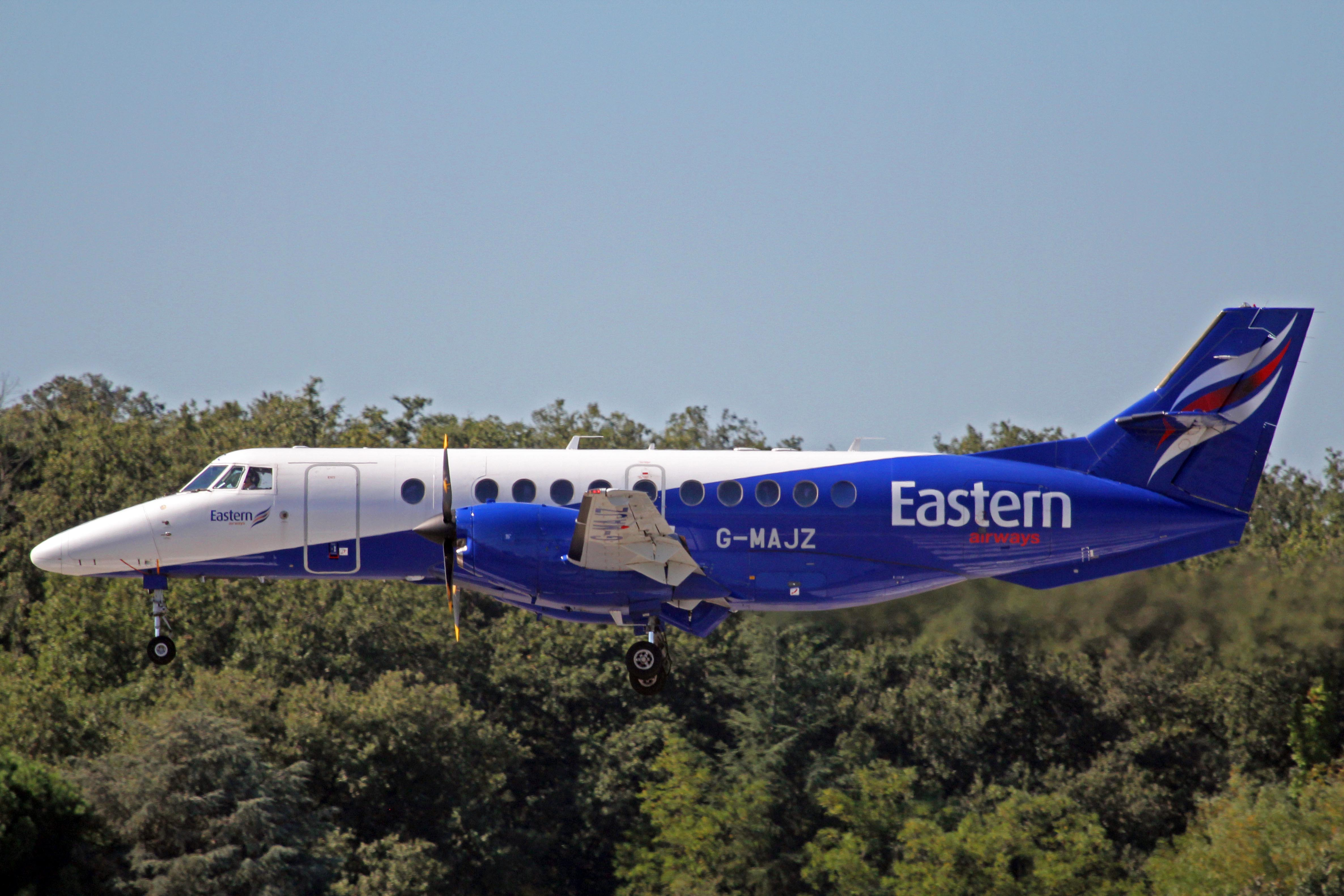
- BAe Jetstream 41
| IATA | ICAO | Call sign |
|---|---|---|
| T3 | EZE | EASTFLIGHT |
- Founded: 19 November 1997
- Commenced operations: 1 December 1997
- Ceased operations: 27 October 2025
- AOC #: Air Kilroe Limited
- Operating bases: Aberdeen; Humberside; Newquay
- Fleet size: 16
- Destinations: 6 (as Eastern Airways)
- Headquarters: Humberside Airport; Kirmington, North Lincolnshire
- Key people: Richard Lake, owner, Orient Industrial Holdings
- Employees: 280
- Website: www.easternairways.com

Eastern Airways was a British regional airline headquartered at Humberside Airport near the village of Kirmington, North Lincolnshire, England. The airline operated domestic, international and private charter flights. Around 1,300,000 passengers flew with the airline per rolling year including on services for KLM Cityhopper, charter operations, and government subsidised public service obligation (PSO) services which would otherwise be commercially unfeasible.

The airline had its own hubs in Aberdeen Airport and Humberside.Airport

Air Kilroe held a United Kingdom Civil Aviation Authority Type A Operating Licence. It was permitted to carry passengers, cargo and mail on aircraft with 20 or more seats and was IOSA approved.

== History ==
=== Early years ===
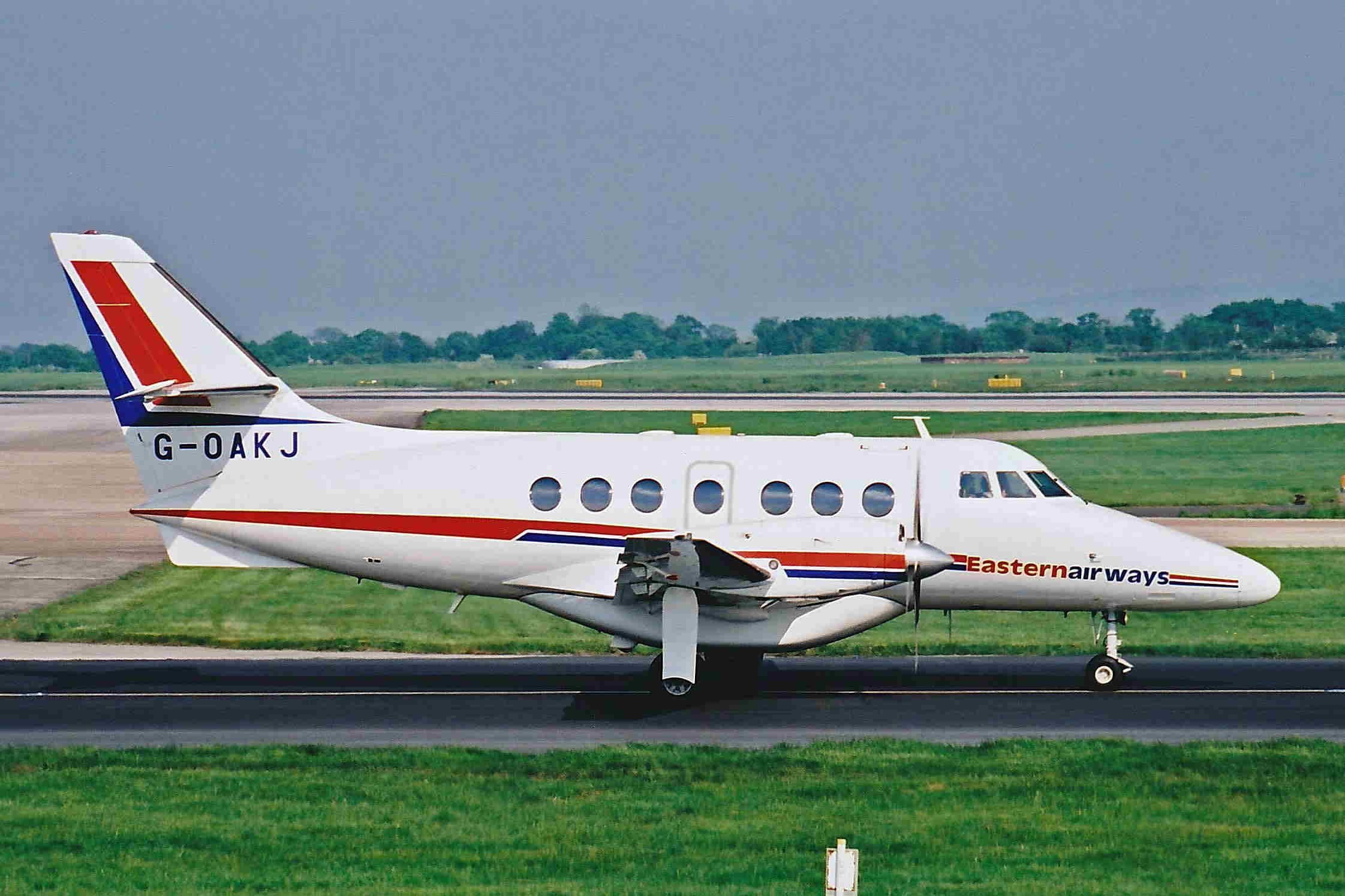
BAe Jetstream 31 at Manchester, 2001

Co-founded by Bryan Huxford and Richard Lake, the airline started operations in December 1997 with a scheduled route between Humberside and Aberdeen with a leased Swearingen Metro, following KLM UK's withdrawal from the route. In February 1999, it took over Manchester based Air Kilroe Ltd. scheduled operations, thereby acquiring an air operator's certificate and a fleet of two BAe Jetstream 32 aircraft.

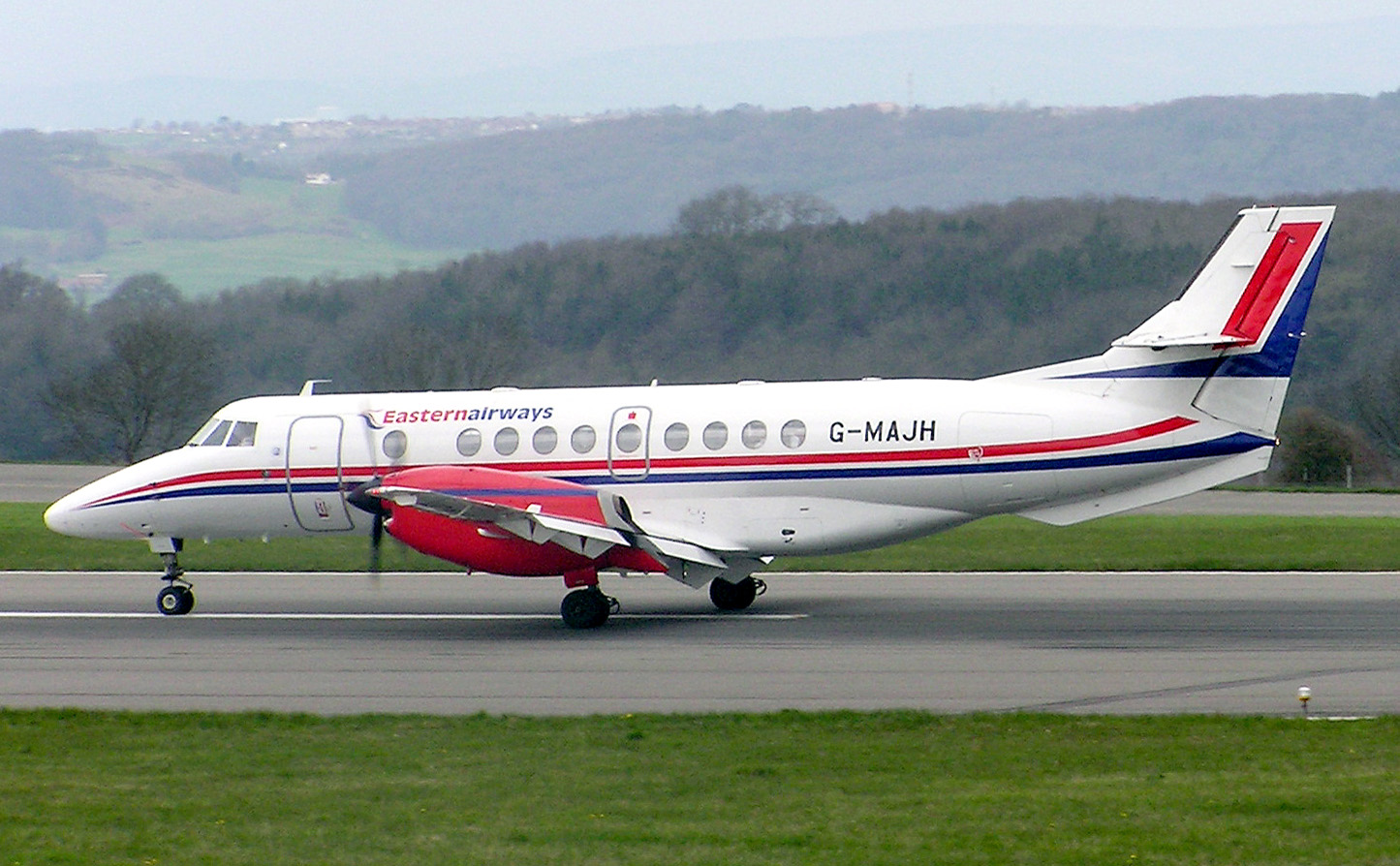
BAe Jetstream 41 at Bristol International airport

In 2002, the first BAe Jetstream 41 entered the Eastern fleet, the aircraft type which formed the majority of the fleet up until the airline ceased operations.

12 aircraft and their associated routes were transferred from British Airways CitiExpress on 30 March 2003. An Embraer 145 and 135 were also wet-leased from City Airline in 2003, which were then replaced with Saab 2000 aircraft, which peaked at 8 being operated by 2013 including acquisitions from Crossair and other European carriers.

In 2006, Eastern Airways wet-leased a Dornier 328 from Cirrus Airlines for six months to operate a Newcastle to London City service before switching this onto the BAe Jetstream 41. Eastern Airways also purchased a Jetstream 41 training simulator.

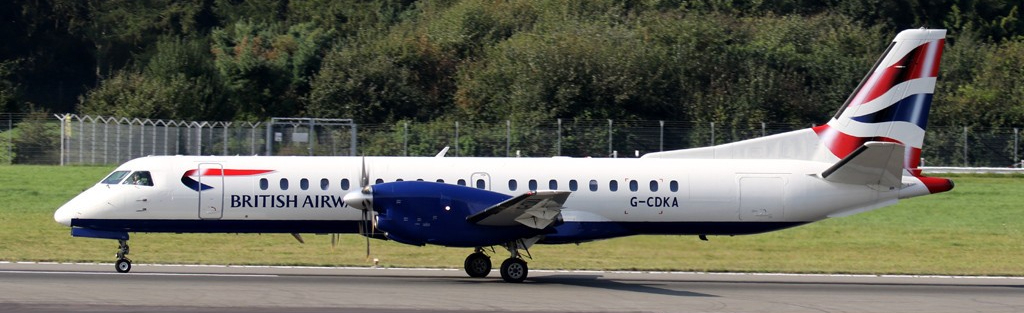
A Saab 2000 in British Airways livery

As part of One NorthEast's "Passionate People Passionate Places" campaign for North East England, Eastern Airways had a Jetstream 41 painted in promotional colours. It also featured in the 2007 Sunderland International Airshow. A Saab 2000 was also painted in a promotional 'Aberdeen City and Shire' colour scheme. The airline shut down its hub at the Isle of Man in August 2009, discontinuing routes to Birmingham and Newcastle from the airport.

=== 2010s ===
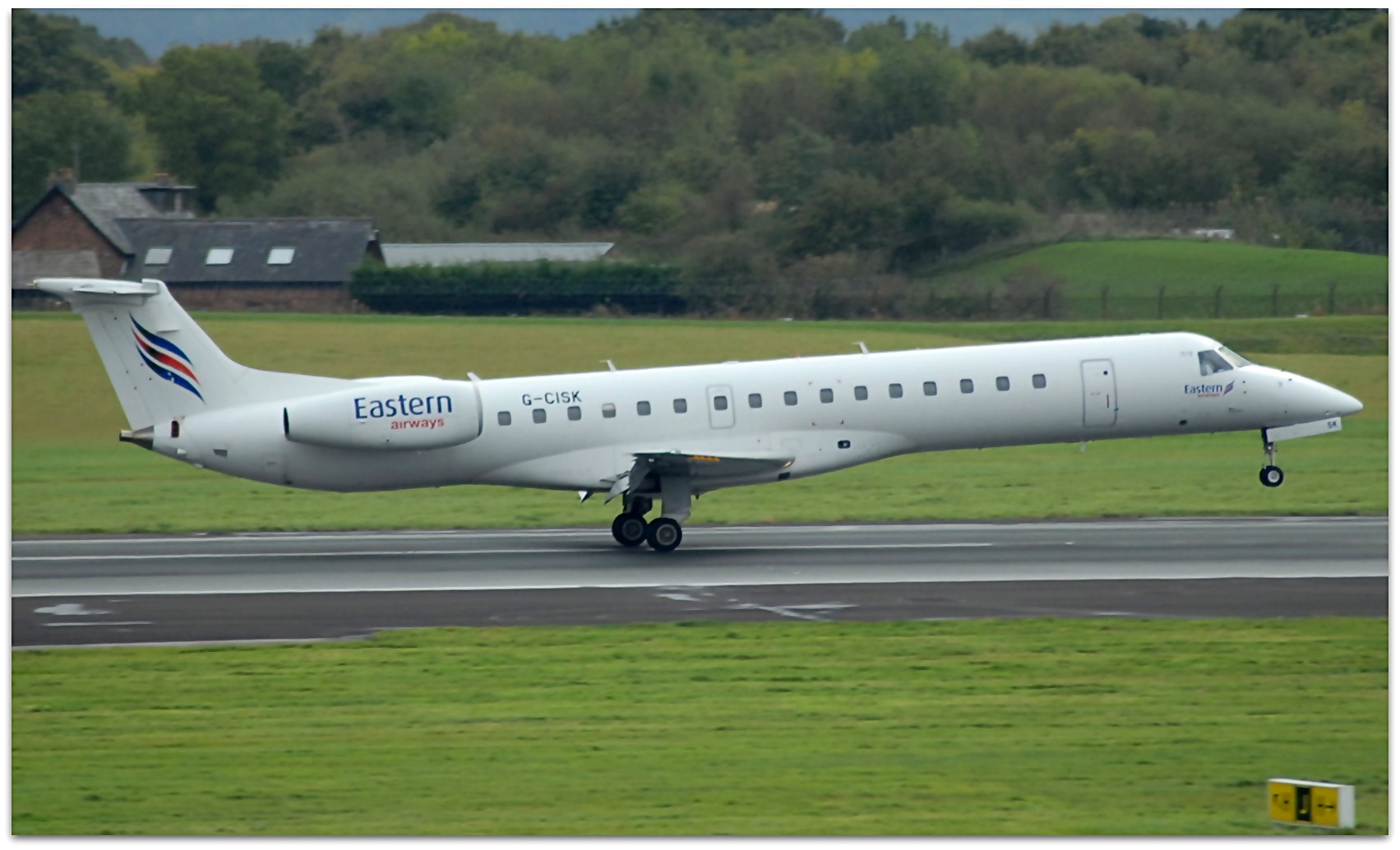
Embraer 135

In July 2010, the airline took delivery of an Embraer 135 with 37 seats and signed a lease on a second, thus adding jet aircraft to their fleet for the first time since the acquisition to replace their previously operated Embraer ERJ aircraft. They were to be used mainly on charter services to central and Eastern Europe; however, they also offered increased flexibility on the airline's scheduled flights. In July 2010, the airline named one of their BAe Jetstream 41 aircraft after the comedian Ken Dodd in celebration of the year anniversary of the start of their flights from Liverpool and Dodd's support shown in the region.

In September 2010, it was announced that Eastern Airways had bought Air Southwest, however shut down the airline a year later following continued losses and changes in the growth of Flybe.

In August 2012, Eastern Group purchased Manchester Airports Group's 82% stake in Humberside Airport, becoming the primary airline serving the airport.

In February 2014, Bristow Group, a major helicopter operator serving the offshore oil and gas industry, acquired a 60% interest in Eastern Airways and in 2018 acquired the remaining 40%. The airline continued to operate under the Eastern Airways brand. Bristow also acquired a controlling interest in the Australian airline Airnorth, another regional airline which operates fixed wing regional jet and turboprop aircraft. During this time, the airline's route network was focused on Aberdeen, providing service to the oil industry, as well as a smaller operation in Newcastle. The airline also commenced a number of French domestic routes in 2015, supported by public service obligation (PSO) subsidies.

Facing increased competition from growing low-cost airlines and the aggressive UK expansion of airlines such as Flybe and Wideroe, the airline has significantly scaled back its schedule route network from Aberdeen, concentrating on contract and charter services for which Eastern Airways had become recognised as a market leader in delivering.

In March 2017, Eastern re-entered the Isle of Man with service to Belfast City, Glasgow and Newcastle, following the collapse of local airline Citywing. The airline also took over PSO-funded service between Cardiff and Anglesey, facilitating the opening of a base in Cardiff. The Isle of Man service was cancelled a year later, whereas the Cardiff service continued until the Welsh Government stopped providing funding in 2021.

Eastern also operated flights from the Isle of Man to London City Airport on behalf of British Airways using Saab 2000 aircraft.

==== Bristow Group ====
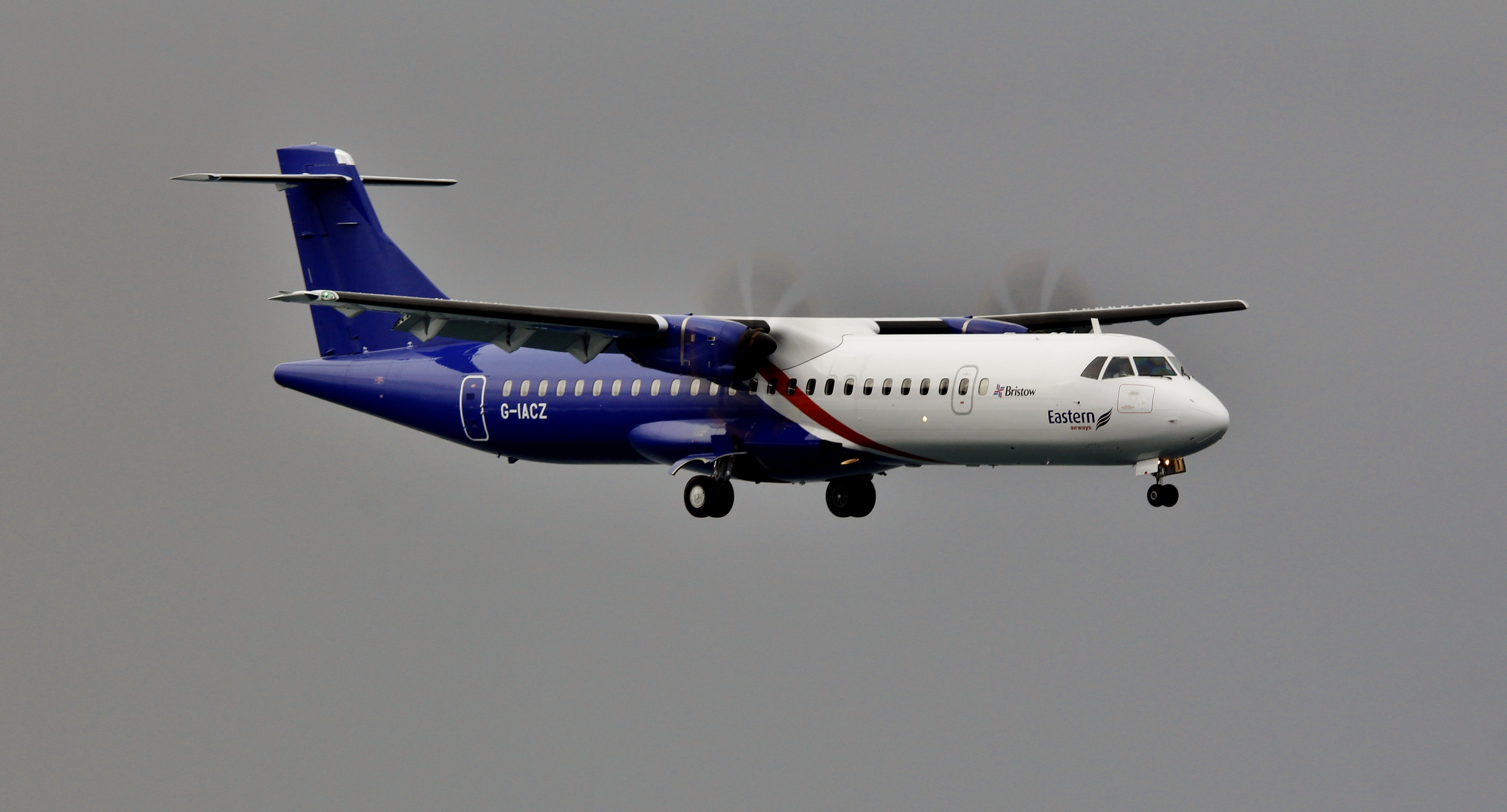
ATR 72-600

In September 2017, Eastern received its first of two new ATR 72-600. The aircraft operated on the Aberdeen – Scatsta route on behalf of Bristow Helicopters. With Bristow Group in financial difficulties, it sold the Eastern Airways group of companies back to one of its founders, Richard Lake, in May 2019.

==== Eastern Airways and Flybe franchise ====
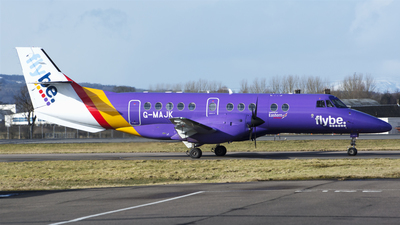
A BAe Jetstream 41, operated for Flybe

It was announced on 21 September 2017 that Eastern Airways would enter a franchise with Flybe, starting on 29 October 2017. The franchise saw all scheduled flights operated by Eastern Airways carry BE (Flybe) flight numbers. Following Loganair's decision to end its partnership with Flybe, to remain on multiple markets flyBe announced a significant expansion onto routes also operated by Loganair using Eastern Airways to operate the services, largely targeting the Scottish Highlands, including introduction jet service into Sumburgh for the first time as part of the operating plan flyBe contracted Eastern Airways to provide. The last of these new routes was dropped by the end of 2018, citing a lack of demand for two competing airlines given capacity had doubled on many with a static market size.

=== 2020s ===
On 5 March 2020, Flybe entered administration and ceased operations, resulting in Eastern Airways resuming flying under its own brand. Seeking to take advantage of Flybe's demise, the airline announced the opening of a base at Southampton, where Flybe had operated 95% of the airport's flights, with new routes to Manchester and Newcastle, eventually being joined by Belfast City and Dublin, along with pre-existing service to Aberdeen, Leeds Bradford and Teesside. The routes from Manchester were subsequently cancelled.

In May 2021, Eastern commenced flying to Gibraltar for the first time, with services from both Birmingham and Southampton airports, however cancelled both routes a year later as international travel remained in slow recovery post COVID-19. The airline also commenced service between Cardiff and Belfast City, seeking to fill another gap left by Flybe's collapse, but suspended the route in early 2022 after the Welsh Government decided to permanently cancel the PSO service between Cardiff and Anglesey suspended during COVID-19, thus rendering the airline's Cardiff base unviable as a single route operation.

==== PSO contracts ====
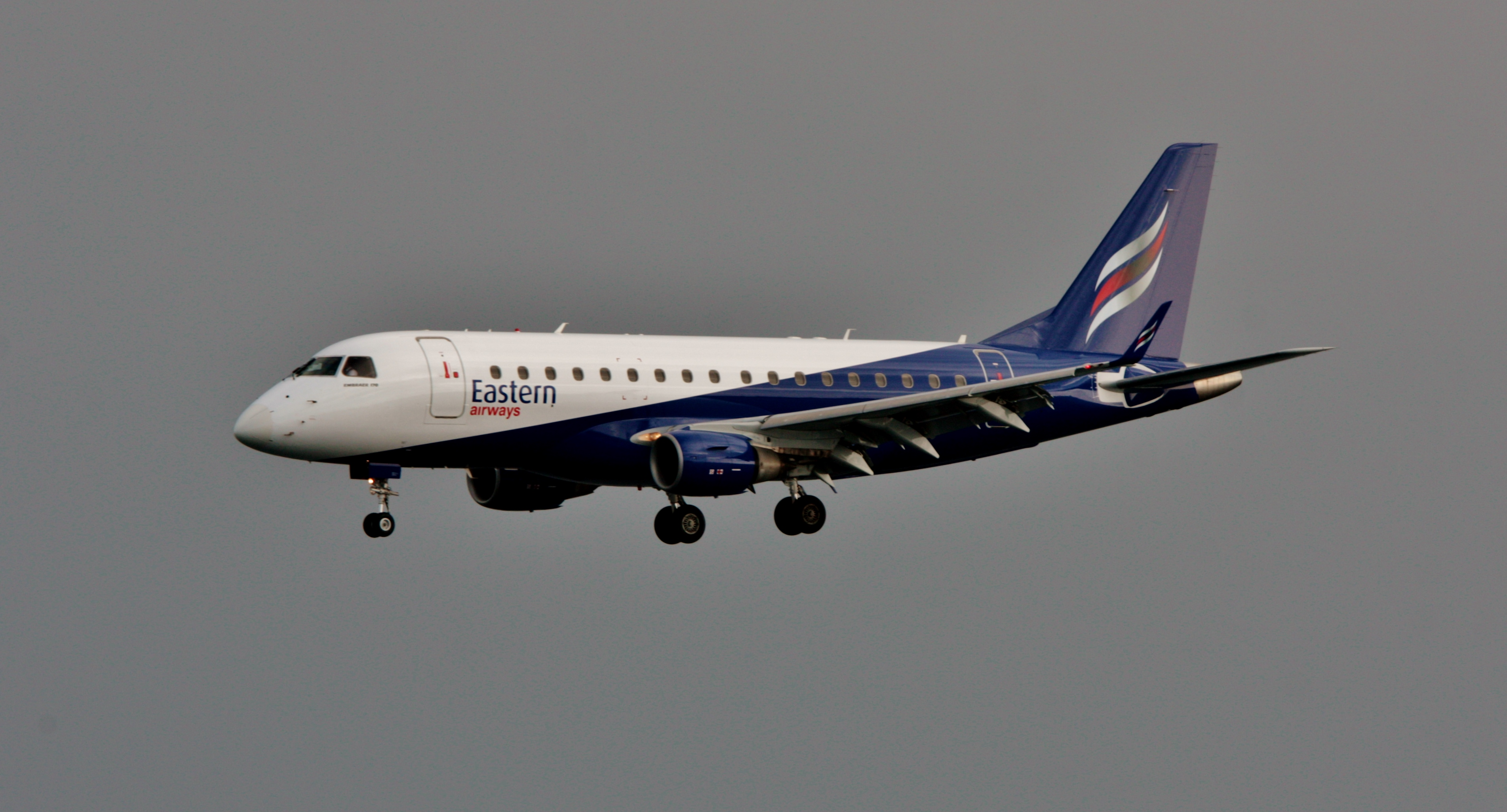
Embraer 170

Eastern Airways had previously operated the Welsh Government PSO service between Cardiff Airport and Anglesey Airport from 2015 until the government removed funding for the service in 2022 and did not reopen the north–south connection to the capital post COVID-19.

In December 2021, Eastern Airways was awarded the PSO contract to operate a service between Newquay and London Gatwick which between 2021 and 2024 saw the growth of passenger volumes back to over 85,000 annually between Cornwall and London.

Additionally in April 2022 Eastern Airways were awarded another PSO contract in Scotland to operate services between Aberdeen and Wick. The service was the only scheduled flight into Wick, operated by the Scottish Government / Transport Scotland via Highlands and Islands Airports, with the aim of revitalising air travel from the remote region.

Both these PSOs remain operated in 2025 on the ATR72-600 and BAe Jetstream 41 respectively supporting directly and indirectly over 80 jobs between the two services labelled as lifeline air services.

==== Oil and gas contract ====
In 2024, with over a decade of operating between Aberdeen and both Sumburgh Airport and Scatsta Airport in the Shetland Islands for multiple oil & gas sector clients, Eastern Airways were awarded a seven-year contract extension in conjunction with Bristow Helicopters to support BP Oils in their shuttle flying between Aberdeen and Sumburgh on the BAe Jetstream 41.

==== KLM Cityhopper ====
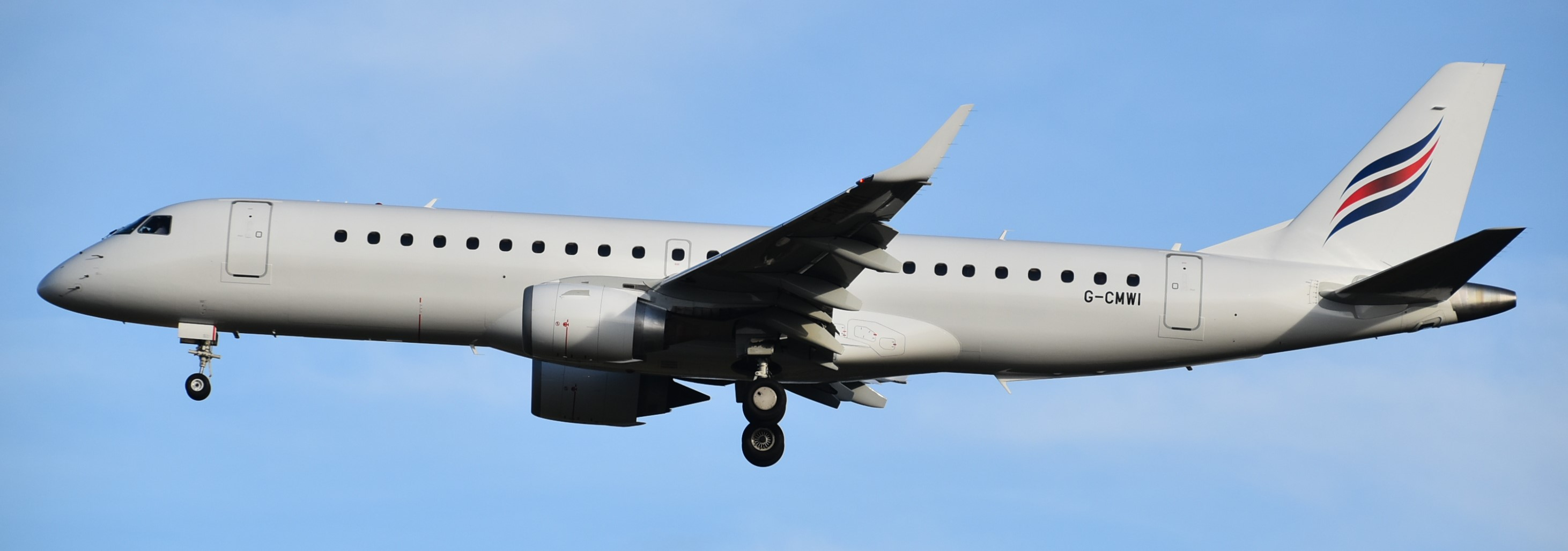
Embraer 190

In March 2024, Eastern Airways commenced an Aircraft, Crew, Maintenance and Insurance (ACMI) lease on behalf of KLM Royal Dutch Airlines, taking over the operation of the Humberside Airport and Teesside Airport KLM services to the Netherlands with additional flying to Manchester, Glasgow, Newcastle and Norwich on two 100-seat Embraer E190 E-Jets.

By October 2024 this had expanded to three Embraer 190 aircraft with the addition of Bristol as a base for KLM including operating to Southampton and Cardiff, and by March 2025 a fourth UK base had been added at Bristol with the addition of a fourth Embraer 190, bringing the airlines weekly seat capacity for KLM to 22,400 and over 1.15 million per year.

As this KLM Cityhopper and Eastern Airways ACMI relationship grew, ways of protecting the critical worldwide Amsterdam hub connectivity which is fundamental to regional UK economic prosperity was added aligned to the E-Jet fleet expansion of the carrier. KLM Cityhopper ceased the contract with Eastern Airways on 5 October 2025, just a few weeks before Eastern Airways ceased operations.

==== Administration ====
On 27 October 2025, Eastern Airways filed a notice of intention to appoint administrators, which resulted in the suspension of all flight operations. On 31 October, the majority of Eastern Airways' staff were made redundant. The company formally went into administration on 6 November 2025. This marked the end of the BAe Jetstream 41's active passenger service in the UK.

The administration resulted in the cancellation of the Aberdeen–Wick and Gatwick–Newquay PSO services. On 6 November, Cornwall Council announced that Isles of Scilly Skybus had been appointed as replacement operator for the Gatwick–Newquay route.

== Corporate affairs ==
=== Headquarters ===
The head office was located at Schiphol House, on the property of Humberside Airport, in Kirmington, North Lincolnshire. (Note: The Registered Office is at Redhill Aerodrome, Kings Mill Lane, Redhill, Surrey.)

=== Interline agreements ===
Eastern Airways formerly had Interline agreements with the following airlines:

- Air France
- Hahn Air

== Fleet ==
At the time operations ceased, the fleet comprised the following:

| Aircraft | In service | Orders | Passengers |
|---|---|---|---|
| ATR 72-600 | 4 | — | 70-72 |
| BAe Jetstream 41 | 7 | — | 29 |
| Embraer 170 | 1 | — | 76 |
| Embraer 190 | 4 | 2 | 100 |
| Total | 16 | 2 | |
