= Roy Calvert =

NZ Air Force officer DFC & 2 bars (1913-2002)

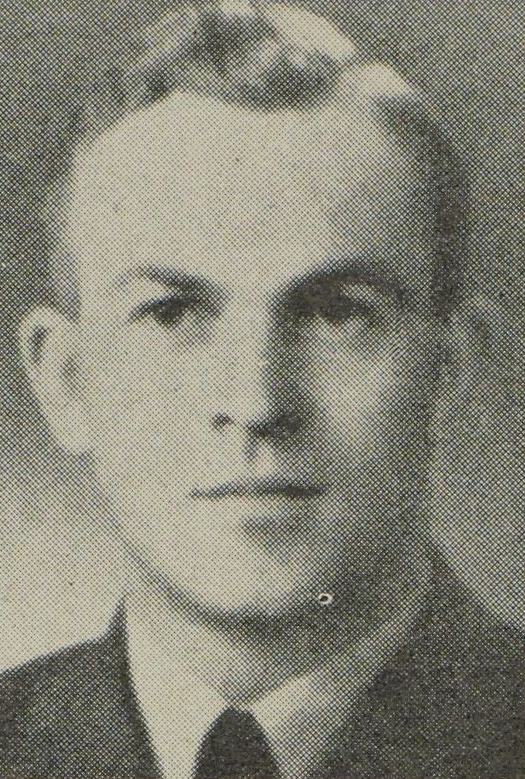
- Born: 31 October 1913; Cambridge, New Zealand
- Died: 26 March 2002 (aged 88); Cambridge, New Zealand
- Military career
- Allegiance: New Zealand
- Branch: Royal New Zealand Air Force
- Service years: 1939–1945
- Rank: Squadron Leader
- Units: No. 50 Squadron RAF; No. 630 Squadron RAF
- Commands: Bomber Command
- Conflicts: Second World War
- Awards: Distinguished Flying Cross & Two Bars; Mentioned in Despatches
- Other work: Farmer

Roy Oldfield Calvert, DFC & Two Bars (31 October 1913 – 26 March 2002) was an officer of the Royal New Zealand Air Force (RNZAF) during the Second World War. He is one of only four New Zealand-born airmen to receive two Bars to his Distinguished Flying Cross.

== Flying career ==
Calvert was born on 31 October 1913 in Cambridge, a small town in the Waikato region of New Zealand's North Island. He was educated at Cambridge Primary School and between 1926 and 1929, King's College School in Auckland. Before joining the RNZAF Calvert was a wool grader in the Cambridge district.

Calvert volunteered for the RNZAF very early on in the war and was eventually accepted in December 1940. He began training at the Ground Training School, Wereroa, near Levin. At the completion of this course in May 1941, he received his Wings as a qualified RNZAF pilot. Calvert was posted Liverpool, England, via Canada and sent to No 2 School of Navigation, at RAF Cranage, where he trained in navigation on the Avro Anson light bomber. On 14 April 1942, Calvert was posted to No. 50 Squadron based at RAF Skellingthorpe. Two days later he flew his first operational mission in a Manchester on a night raid on Lille, France. Despite their unreliable engines, Calvert enjoyed flying Manchesters.

=== Distinguished Flying Cross ===
Along with his navigator, Calvert was awarded the Distinguished Flying Cross in October 1942 for his part in several combat missions over hostile territory including the 94-bomber raid on the Le Creusot armament factory, whilst flying both Manchesters and Lancasters. The citation read:

Flying Officer Calvert and Pilot Officer Sears as pilot and navigator of aircraft respectively have flown together on many sorties. Whatever the weather or the opposition they have always endeavoured to press home their attacks and, on numerous occasions, have obtained excellent photographs. Throughout their tour of duty, these officers have displayed a high standard of skill, together with great devotion to duty.

=== Bar to DFC ===
On the evening of 9/10 November 1942, Calvert flew an operation to Hamburg, almost at the end of his first tour. Approaching Denmark, towering cloud gave them icing problems that was so thick they could not see anything that would help identify position. Calvert turned south to run to the target by dead reckoning. Through a break in the clouds, Calvert spotted railway marshalling yards and prepared the aircraft for a bombing run. At that moment, the plane was hit by flak killing the wireless operator, smashing the navigators arm and peppering fragments of perspex and flak splinters into Calvert's face and arm. With radio and navigation aids out, aileron trim and rudder unserviceable, Calvert flew the badly damaged bomber back to England, crashlanding at Bradwell Bay on the Essex coast. After a stay in hospital, Calvert returned to base and was awarded a Bar to his DFC. The citation read:

During a recent sortie, Flying Officer Calvert's aircraft was subjected to heavy anti-aircraft fire, sustaining much damage. The wireless operator was killed, and both the pilot and navigator were wounded. The aircraft became difficult to control, but Flying Officer Calvert, although he had a piece of shell splinter in his left arm, set course for home. Sergeant Medani, despite the severity of his wounds and subsequent loss of blood, continued his duties until he collapsed. Even so, he succeeded in giving his pilot a final course which enabled him to reach an airfield in this country where he made a skilful crash landing in bad visibility. Both these members of aircraft crew displayed great courage and tenacity in the face of harassing circumstances.

=== Second Bar to DFC ===
At the end of his first tour, Calvert instructed for a year, but returned to flying operations in January 1944 with No. 630 Squadron based at East Kirkby, Lincolnshire. By August 1944 Calvert he had been promoted to acting squadron leader and was also acting commanding officer of the squadron for about two months. He was awarded a second Bar to his DFC on 15 September 1944, for service while flying with that squadron. His citation read:

Since joining this Squadron in January 1944, Acting Squadron Leader Calvert has taken part in attacks against many strongly defended targets in Germany, including Berlin and Leipzig. He has consistently shown skill, determination and reliability, and as captain of his aircraft he has set a high standard to the other members of his Squadron. His operational experience and enthusiasm have been invaluable in the training of new crews.

== Post-war ==
Calvert returned to New Zealand in late 1944 after he accepted the opportunity to join a group of New Zealanders about to return home through North America. He was discharged on 15 March 1945, returned to Cambridge and became a farmer for the rest of his working life. Calvert died on 26 March 2002, aged 88, after a battle with cancer. He was buried at the RSA Cemetery at Hautapu, Cambridge having lived in the town and district for all his pre- and post-war life.
