= Lincolnshire Aviation Heritage Centre =

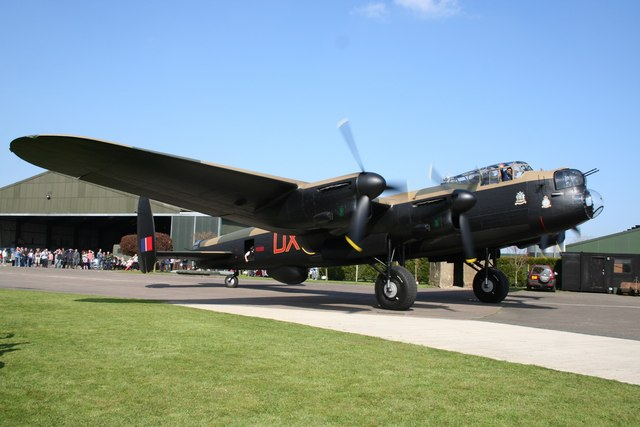
- Lancaster NX611 in front of the museum's buildings (2007)

- Location within Lincolnshire
- Established: 1988
- Location: East Kirkby, Lincolnshire, England
- Coordinates: 53°08′21″N 0°0′5″W
- Type: Military aviation museum
- Visitors: 40,000 per year
- Directors: Fred and Harold Panton
- Website: www.lincsaviation.co.uk

The Lincolnshire Aviation Heritage Centre is an aviation museum in East Kirkby, Lincolnshire, England. It was opened to the public in 1988 by Lincolnshire farmers Fred and Harold Panton, as a memorial to their older brother, Christopher Whitton Panton, who was killed on operations during the Second World War.

== History ==
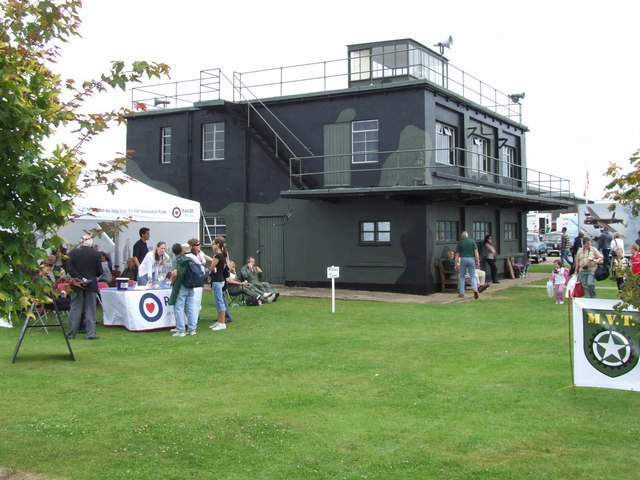
RAF East Kirkby's former control-tower, during a RAF Benevolent Fund event (August 2009)

Pilot Officer Christopher Panton served as a Flight Engineer with Royal Canadian Air Force 433 Squadron, based at RAF Skipton-on-Swale. On the night of 30/31 March 1944, he was flying in Handley Page Halifax HX272, one of 782 heavy bombers taking part in a raid on the German city of Nuremberg. This attack, known as RAF Bomber Command's "Black Friday", would become notorious for the high losses incurred – 108 British aircraft were lost, 665 aircrew were killed and 159 taken prisoner. (Note: The raid took place on a night of bright moonlight. There was little cloud and the weather conditions caused the British heavy bombers to produce extensive Contrails (these normally did not form at the height the bombers flew at). As well as being unusually visible, the British had the bad luck that their route took their aircraft directly through the zone in which 200 German night-fighters, already in the air, were waiting for them - the Germans had been forewarned as their radar had picked up the bomber force before it had even crossed the British coast. The conditions for the Germans were ideal - one pilot used only 56 rounds of ammunition to shoot down four British aircraft.(See Lord and Fox (1978)).) One of those aircraft was HX272, which caught fire and exploded after being attacked by a night fighter over Friesen, Germany. Christopher Panton was among the five crew killed, the remaining three survived to become prisoners of war.

By the early 1970s, Christopher's younger brothers – Fred and Harold Panton – were successful poultry farmers. They became interested in acquiring a Second World War aircraft as a tribute to him and managed to obtain an option to purchase Avro Lancaster Mk VII, NX611, then serving as a gate guardian at RAF Scampton. The aircraft's purchase had the condition that it remain at Scampton until 1983. In 1981, they bought a part of the former Royal Air Force airfield, RAF East Kirkby, to be a site for the aircraft when it became available. The Lancaster was moved there in 1987 and has been there ever since. Other exhibits have also been acquired and historic aircraft with other owners are housed there, but the Lancaster remains the museum's focus.

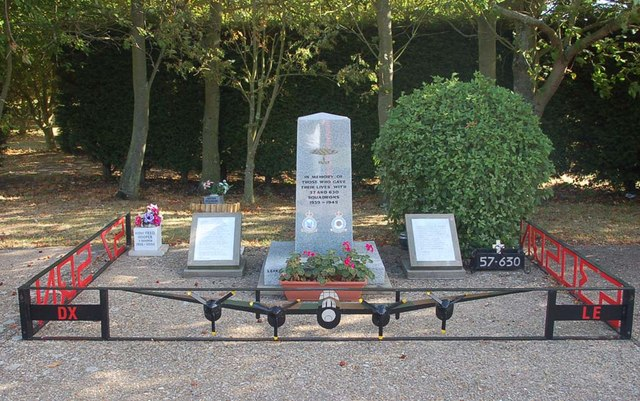
The memorial to the aircrews of 57 and 630 Squadron

The airfield was originally built in 1943 as a Bomber Command Station and was used by both No. 57 Squadron RAF and No. 630 Squadron RAF from 1943 until the end of the war. It had four years of post–war use by United States Air Force for Air Rescue squadrons before military use ceased in 1958. The airfield was sold in 1964. Much of the runway is still intact today and it is used by local farmers as hard standing. The control tower has been recorded as being haunted.

In 2008, the museum opened a part–grass, part–concrete unlicensed airfield, allowing aircraft to land there with prior permission. The Prime Meridian passes through the site; its position is marked by an inscribed monument. There is also a monument to the airmen from 57 and 630 Squadron who were lost during the war.

== Lancaster NX611 Just Jane ==
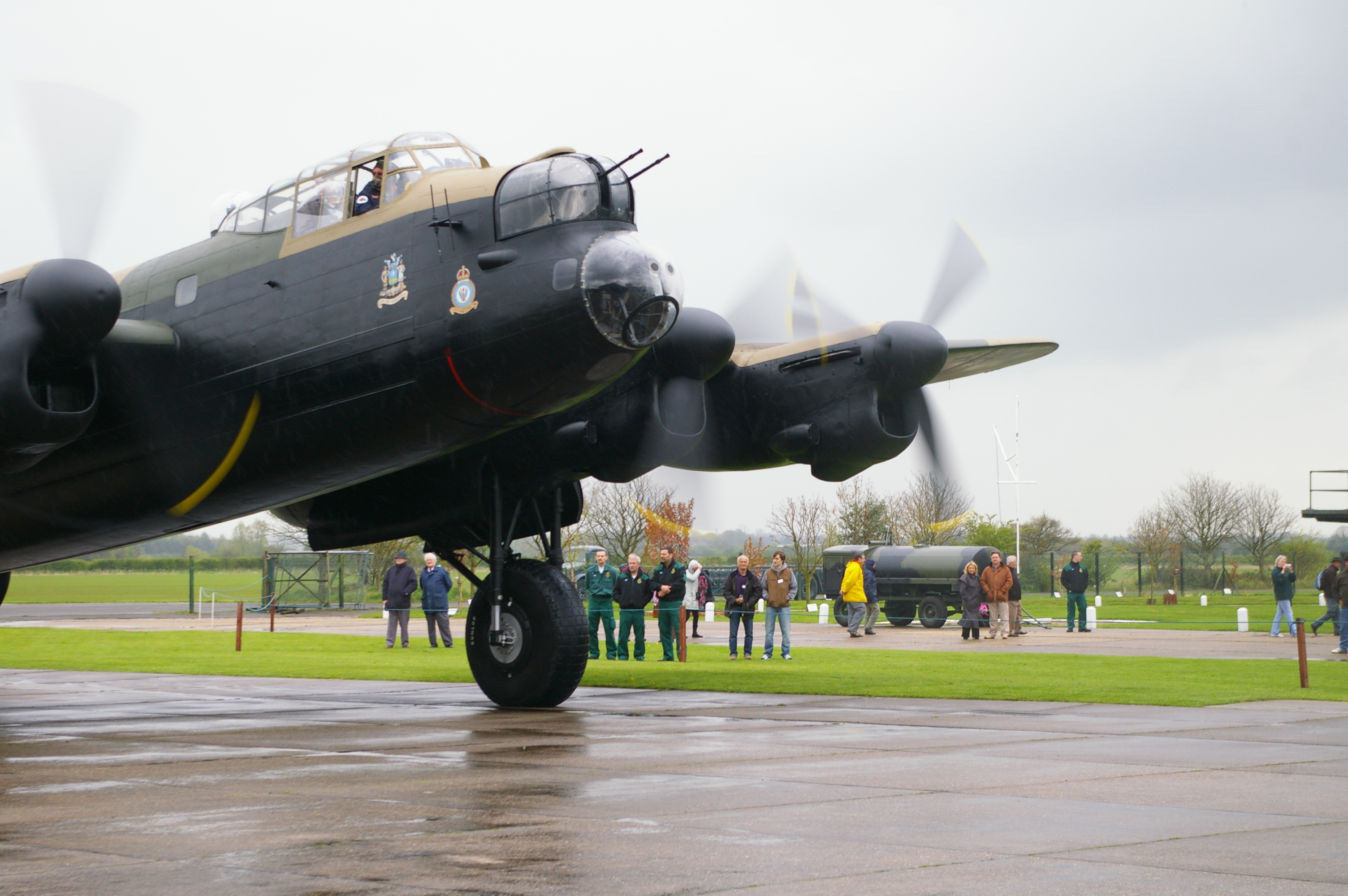
Just Jane during a taxi–run, (May 2008)

The centre's main exhibit is Avro Lancaster Mk VII, NX611, named Just Jane after a popular wartime comic character.

The Lancaster was built by Austin Aero Ltd at their Cofton Hackett Works just south of Birmingham in April 1945. It was intended to be used against Japan as part of the RAF's Tiger Force. However, the surrender of Japan meant it never saw action. It spent several years in storage before becoming one of 54 Lancasters sold to the French government. It entered service with French Naval Aviation and used for maritime patrol and air–sea rescue work. The upper turret was removed, and radar was fitted as well as the equipment to carry and drop an Airborne lifeboat.

The Lancaster was operated by French forces over the Atlantic and Mediterranean, and later the Pacific after being redeployed to New Caledonia (its service in the far East included bombing raids during the First Indochina War). In 1964, the French donated it to the Historical Aircraft Preservation Society, who flew it back to the United Kingdom and subsequently flew it for several years. However, the society could not afford the aircraft's operating costs and it was put up for auction in 1972. The Panton brothers attempted, but failed, to buy it as a memorial to their brother. Instead, it became a gate guardian at RAF Scampton (the auction winner lent it to the RAF in exchange for them transporting and maintaining the now–grounded aircraft). The Pantons were able to subsequently buy it, with the condition that it remain at Scampton as gate guardian until 1983. In the end, it remained there until 1987.

In 1987, NX611 was brought to East Kirkby. It was given the name Just Jane and a restoration programme begin in 1992, with the Rolls-Royce Merlin engines being restored to running condition. The Lancaster is used for regular taxi runs, which raises some of the money needed to maintain and restore it. In 2011, it was used in the filming of the Doctor Who episode, The Doctor, the Widow and the Wardrobe.

Restoration of Just Jane to flying status is an ongoing project, which is to soon be completed with the centre acquiring the last of four airworthy Merlin engines at the end of 2012. As of the end of 2021, the aircraft was still undergoing restoration.

== Other aircraft ==
The centre also houses the cockpit of an English Electric Canberra WH957, and the wreckage of Supermarine Spitfire Vb BL655; it crashed in July 1943, killing its Canadian pilot, Flying Officer Norman Alexander Watt. There are two aircraft undergoing restoration to static condition, a Percival Proctor and a Handley Page Hampden. There is also a privately owned and taxiable De Havilland Mosquito HJ711. The centre acquired a B-25 Mitchell Bomber 44-29366 in 2022. The B-25 and other museum aircraft were featured in ground scenes for the series All Creatures Great and Small which filmed RAF training scenes at the Centre.

== Other exhibits ==
The centre's collection includes twelve Second World War-era, RAF ground vehicles and a concrete–filled, practice Upkeep bomb (bouncing bomb).

The centre also owns a 60 cm, German anti-aircraft searchlight with its generator, which are in working order.

== See also ==
- List of aerospace museums
