= RAF Scampton =

Royal Air Force station in Lincolnshire, England

RAF Scampton Formerly RFCS Brattleby
- Scampton, Lincolnshire in England
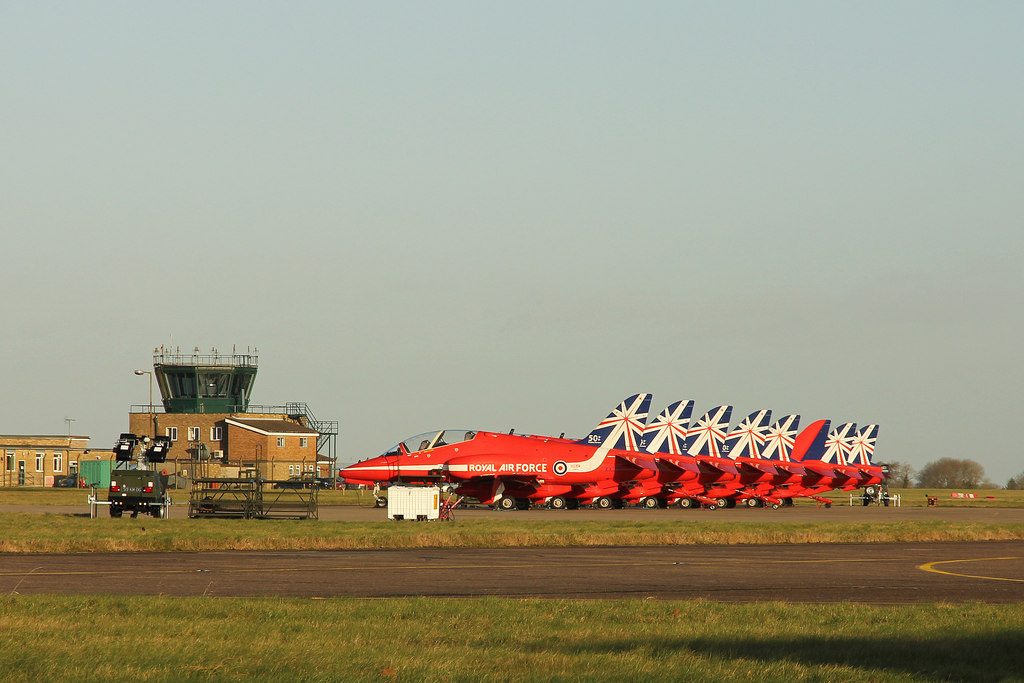
- The Red Arrows at their old home, RAF Scampton

- Armatus non lacessitur (Latin for 'An armed man is not attacked')

Site information
- Type: Royal Air Force station
- Owner: Ministry of Defence
- Operator: Royal Air Force
- Condition: Closed

Location
- Shown within Lincolnshire
- Coordinates: 53°18′28″N 000°33′03″W
- Grid reference: SK965795

Site history
- Built: 1916 and 1936
- In use: 1916–1919; 1936–2023

Airfield information
- Identifiers: IATA: SQZ, ICAO: EGXP, WMO: 03373
- Elevation: 62 metres (203 ft) AMSL
Runways
Direction	Length and surface
04/22	2,740 metres (8,990 ft) Asphalt

Royal Air Force Scampton or RAF Scampton (formerly IATA: SQZ, ICAO: EGXP) is a former Royal Air Force station located adjacent to the A15 road near to the village of Scampton, Lincolnshire, and 6 miles (9.7 km) north of the city of Lincoln, England.

RAF Scampton stood on the site of a First World War Royal Flying Corps landing field, which had been called Brattleby. The station was closed and returned to agriculture following the First World War, and reactivated in the 1930s. It has provided an airfield for fighters in the First World War, bombers during the Second World War and V-force Avro Vulcans during the Cold War.

The station was temporarily closed in 1996, but subsequently re-opened to provide a home for the RAF Aerobatic Team the Red Arrows, and to private companies, temporarily, such as Hawker Hunter Aviation, for the maintenance and storage of aircraft.

In July 2018, the Ministry of Defence announced that Scampton would close and be sold, with all units relocated elsewhere. The station closed on 31 March 2023.

== History ==
=== First World War ===
Home Defence Flight Station Brattleby (also known as Brattleby Cliff) was opened on the site of the current RAF Scampton in late 1916. The airfield was bounded to the east by Ermine Street, to the south by Pollyplatt Lane, to the west by Middle Street, and to the north by Aisthorpe House. The form of the airfield was very similar to that of Hackthorn Park to the north east, which is likely to have been created in the same way. In addition to field boundaries, a number of other features were demolished or used for the airfield, including Aisthorpe House and a farm complex to the east of the site.

The aerodrome covered 116 hectares (287 acres) consisting of a landing ground and six single-span end-opening General Service Flight Sheds arranged in pairs with their doors at 90° to the landing ground. Technical buildings were set out behind these, followed by domestic accommodation close to Ermine Street. These were subdivided into smaller groups depending on rank. Accommodation for women was based around a Women's Hostel.

The first operational unit was A Flight, No. 33 Squadron of the Royal Flying Corps, which flew the Royal Aircraft Factory F.E.2b, defending against the Zeppelin threat. The site then developed into a training aerodrome, supporting No. 60 Training Squadron, followed by No. 81 and No. 11 Training Squadrons, flying the Sopwith Camel, Pup and Dolphin. The station was renamed as Scampton in 1917 following which it was designated as 34 Training Depot Station and continued with its operational programme until it was closed in April 1919.

All of the buildings on the airfield were temporary, even the hedgerows and trees which existed around the field boundaries were retained, so that between the wars the area was returned to its previous form. By 1920 all the buildings, including the hangars, had been removed.

=== Inter-war period ===
By 1936, the Royal Air Force Expansion Scheme had overseen a period of rapid increases both in terms of new squadrons and the development of new stations. The former Brattleby site was one of many earmarked under the expansion programme, situated between three villages; Aisthorpe, Brattleby and Scampton, with its main entrance situated on the A15 road (Ermine Street) heading north from Lincoln. The site was to be constructed to the latest specifications and on completion would form a fully equipped bomber station. From its reopening in August 1936, the station was known as Royal Air Force Station Scampton.

The station consisted of four large C-Type hangars with permanent brick-built technical and domestic buildings. The remaining aerodrome buildings (for technical activities and accommodation) were built in a compact layout behind the hangars, in an arrangement replicated across all of the expansion period airfields: Technical Area, Station Offices, Officers' Mess, Sergeants' Mess, Airmen's' Quarters, Married Quarters, and Officers' Married Quarters. Roads were arranged either parallel or perpendicular to Ermine Street (A15) with the Guardroom at 90° to the main entrance and the Station Headquarters facing Ermine Street. This resulted in the base occupying an area of 150 hectares (360 acres).

As it developed, RAF Scampton made an increasingly dramatic imposition on the surrounding rural landscape, such as to the Lincoln Edge, a Jurassic limestone ridge, which forms the distinctive backbone of the county from Whitton on the Humber Estuary in the north, down to Grantham in the south. Along the top of the Edge, a series of airfields were developed, including RAF Waddington, RAF Cranwell and RAF Scampton.

Upon opening, No. 9 Squadron and No. 214 Squadron were the first residents of the station, arriving in October 1936, operating the Handley Page Heyford and Vickers Virginia. No. 9 Squadron stayed at Scampton until March 1938, No. 214 Squadron having departed for RAF Feltwell in April 1937. Another squadron which was stationed at the base was No. 148 Squadron formed from C Flt of No. 9 Squadron operating the Hawker Audax and later the Vickers Wellesley. The term of residence of No. 148 Squadron was brief being replaced by No. 49 Squadron and No. 83 Squadron in March 1938. At this time both No. 49 Squadron and No. 83 Squadron were operating the Hawker Hind, before re-equipping with the Handley Page Hampden.

=== Second World War ===
==== 1939–1942 ====
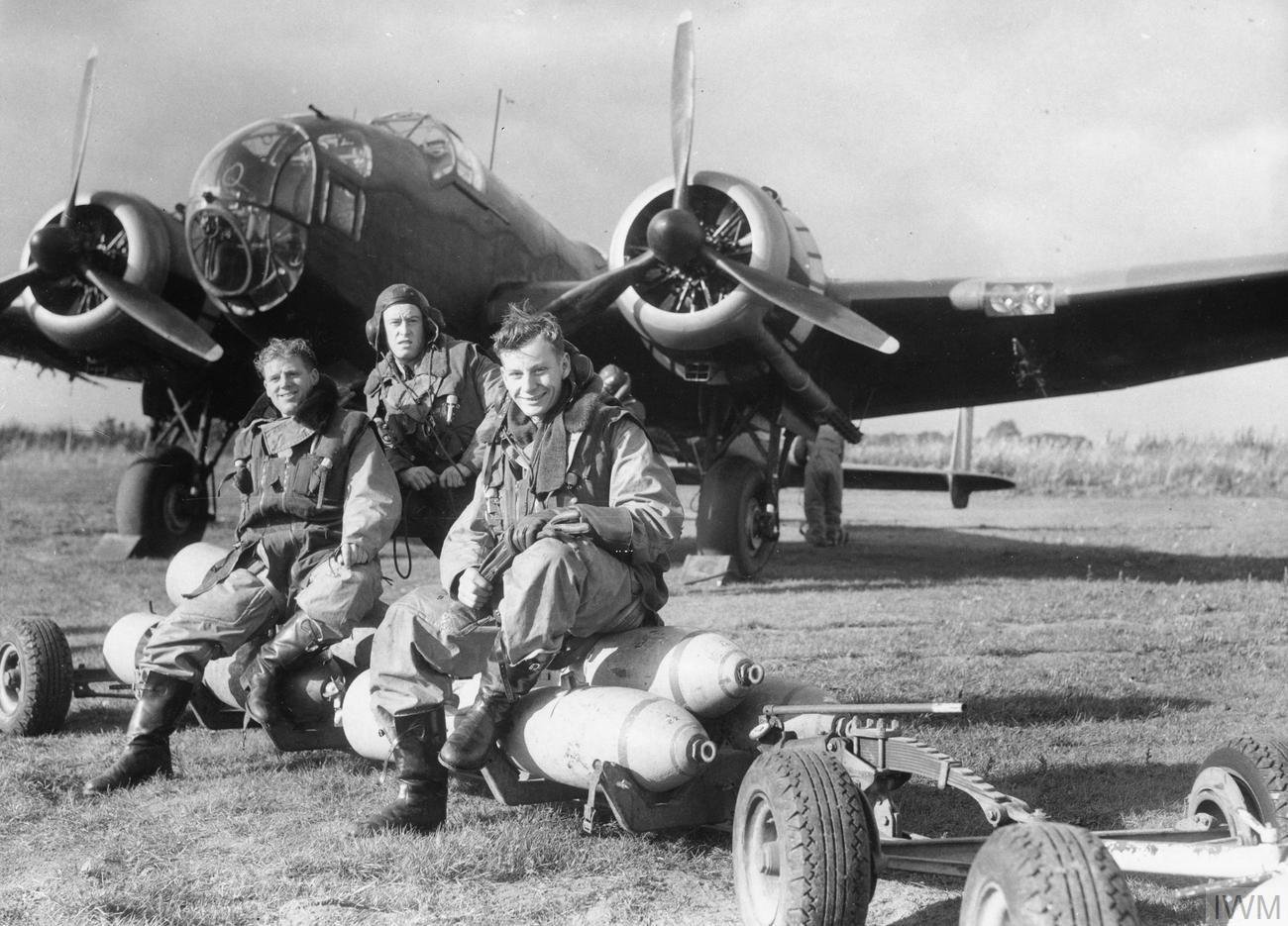
An 83 Squadron Handley Page Hampden and crew, pictured at Scampton, October 1940

At the outbreak of the Second World War, Scampton transferred to No. 5 Group within RAF Bomber Command, playing host to the Hampdens of No. 49 Squadron and No. 83 Squadron. On 3 September 1939, six hours after the declaration of war, RAF Scampton launched the first offensive by the RAF when six Hampdens of No. 83 Squadron, led by (the then) Flying Officer Guy Gibson and three No. 49 Squadron Hampdens, one piloted by Flying Officer Roderick Learoyd, were despatched to conduct a sweep off Wilhelmshaven in Germany. Further operations involving Scampton's squadrons concerned them with the hazardous task of low level minelaying (code named 'Gardening').

For a short time the station was home to the Avro Manchester, operated by No. 49 Squadron and No. 83 Squadron. This was a brief liaison, with the squadrons subsequently converting to the Avro Lancaster. Forming No. 83 Conversion Flight (CF) on 11 April 1942, which in turn was followed by No. 49 CF on 16 May, both squadrons were fully equipped with the Lancaster by the end of June. It was during this period that No. 83 Squadron took delivery of Lancaster Mk.I R5868 which would one day become the Station's gate guardian.

In turn both resident squadrons were then replaced at Scampton by No. 57 Squadron. The first departure was that of No. 83 Squadron which left in August 1942, transferring to RAF Wyton in order to become part of the fledgling Pathfinder Force. This departure resulted in No. 83 CF moving to RAF Wigsley, where it was disbanded into No. 1654 Heavy Conversion Unit. On 2 January 1943, No. 49 Squadron departed for RAF Fiskerton with No. 49 CU disbanding, subsequently becoming 'C' Flight of No. 1661 Heavy Conversion Unit at RAF Waddington. By early January 1943 this left No. 57 Squadron as the sole occupier of the base.

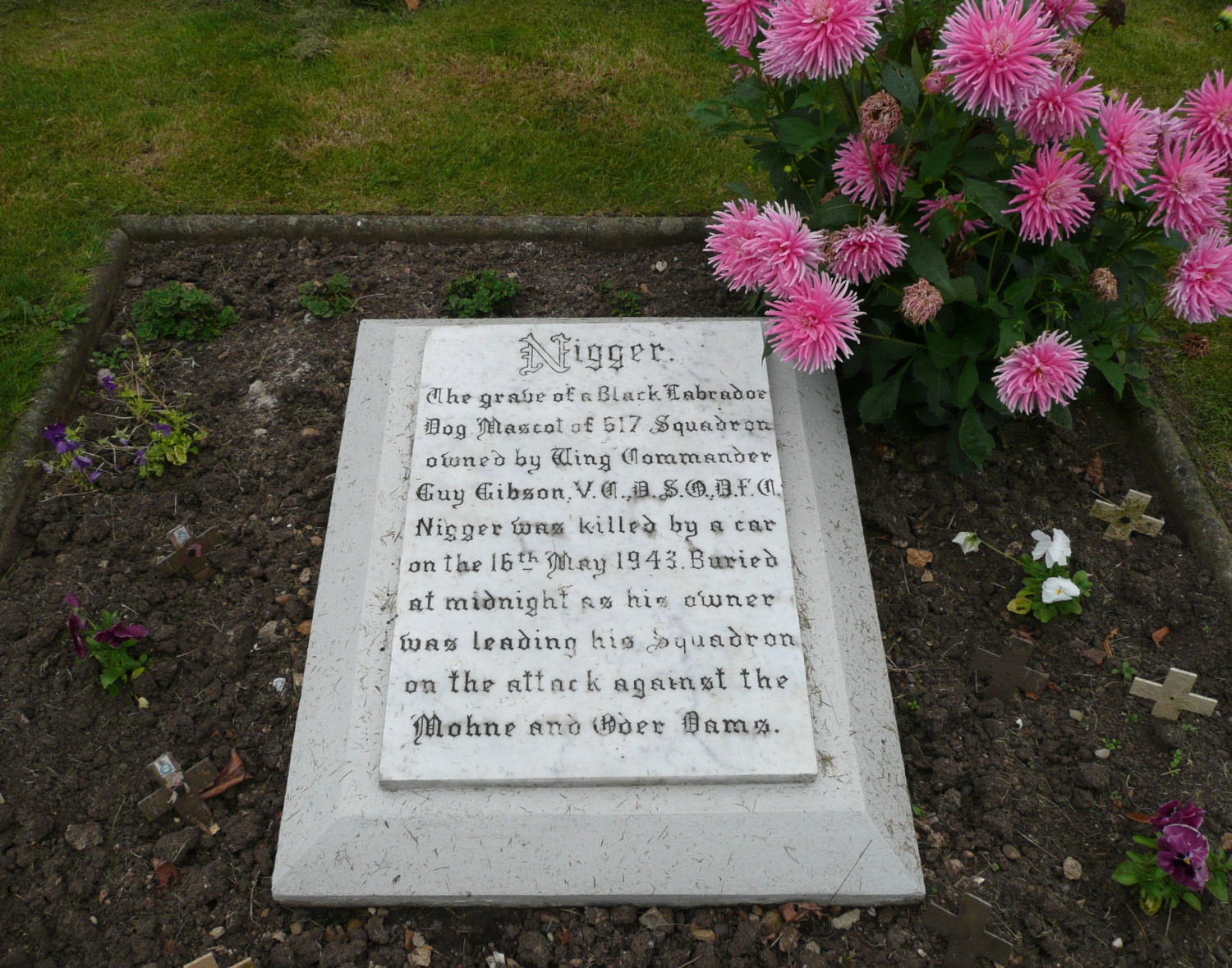
The grave of Guy Gibson's dog

==== 1943–1945 ====
Following the development of the Upkeep bouncing bomb, No. 617 Squadron, originally referred to as "Squadron X", was formed at Scampton in order to carry out the proposed raid, codenamed Operation Chastise. More commonly referred to as the "Dambusters Raid", the raid would go down as the most famous and widely remembered in the history of the RAF.

On the night of 16–17 May 1943, No. 617 Squadron despatched nineteen Lancasters from Scampton. Led by Wing Commander Guy Gibson, the main bulk of the squadron attacked the Sorpe, Eder and Möhne dams with an additional aircraft tasked to perform an attack on the Schwelm Dam. Both the Eder and Möhne dams were breached, however eight of the Lancasters despatched failed to return and fifty-three aircrew were lost. Following the raid Wing Commander Gibson was awarded the Victoria Cross, becoming Scampton's third recipient of the award. On the day of the raid, Wing Commander Gibson's dog, Nigger, was run over and killed on the A15 outside the entrance to the base. He was buried later that night, his grave situated outside Gibson's office at No. 3 Hangar.

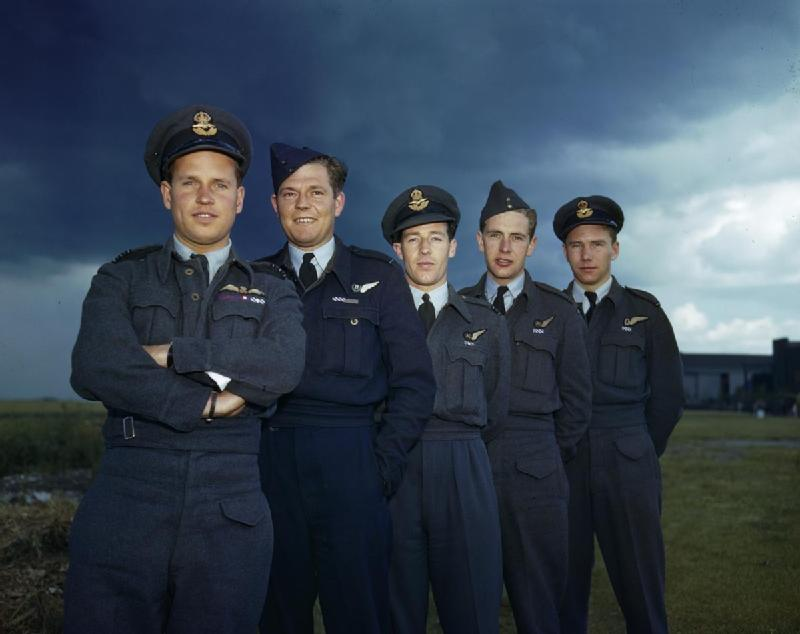
One of a series of iconic images of the members of 617 Squadron taken at RAF Scampton on 22 July 1943, and featuring (left to right) Wing Commander Guy Gibson; Pilot Officer P.M. Spafford; Flight Lieutenant R. E. G. Hutchinson; Pilot Officer G. A. Deering and Flying Officer H. T. Taerum.

In July 1943, No. 617 Squadron was again involved in a precision operation, when twelve aircraft of the squadron took off from Scampton to attack targets in Northern Italy, following which the aircraft continued on to North Africa. The operation met little opposition but the targets were obscured by valley haze and they were not destroyed. The twelve crews returned to Scampton on 25 July from North Africa after bombing Leghorn docks on the return journey. Later in the month nine aircraft took off from Scampton to drop leaflets on Milan, Bologna, Genoa and Turin in Italy. All aircraft completed the mission and landed safely in Blida, Algeria.

At the end of August 1943, No. 57 Squadron and No. 617 Squadron moved to RAF East Kirkby and RAF Coningsby respectively, so that Scampton's runways could be upgraded. With the increased all up weight of the Lancaster it was apparent that the load bearing of hardened runways would be required. The airfield closed at the end of August 1943 for the work to take place re-opening in October 1944. Three concrete runways were laid out. The three runways available were: 05/23 at 2,000 yd (1,828.8 m), 01/19 at 1,500 yd (1,371.6 m) and 11/29 at 1,400 yd (1,280.2 m). A total of eleven loop hard-standings were laid down along the perimeter track to replace those lost or isolated by the construction. The work also saw new bomb stores constructed on land north of the north-west corner of the airfield. The personnel at Scampton at this time was given as 1,844 males and 268 females. On completion of the required work the area of land which the base occupied had now increased to 230 hectares (580 acres).

Following the work control of the station passed from No. 5 Group to No. 1 Group with a new arrival following the upgrade being No. 1690 Bomber Defence Training Flight (BDTF) which arrived on 13 July 1944. The BDTF operated the Supermarine Spitfire, Hawker Hurricane and Miles Martinet, the flight undertaking fighter affiliation against bombers. This unit stayed at the station until September 1944, when it moved to RAF Metheringham. It was replaced by No. 1687 BDTF, which arrived in early December 1944, and departed for RAF Hemswell in April 1945. Two Lancaster squadrons, No. 153 Squadron, and later No. 625 Squadron, of No. 1 Group also arrived at Scampton.

The last bombing mission of the Second World War launched from RAF Scampton was on 25 April 1945, when aircraft from No. 153 Squadron and No. 625 Squadron were despatched as part of the Bombing of Obersalzberg. During the war RAF Scampton lost a total of 551 aircrew and 266 aircraft. Of these 155 were Hampdens and fifteen Manchesters.

=== Post-Second World War ===
Following the end of hostilities No. 153 Squadron disbanded on 28 September 1945, followed by No. 625 Squadron on 7 October. The station continued to operate the Lancaster when No. 100 Squadron arrived in December 1945. They were to be the last Lancaster squadron on the station, departing for RAF Lindholme in May 1946. Returning to their former home in December 1945, No. 57 Squadron introduced the Avro Lincoln to the station.

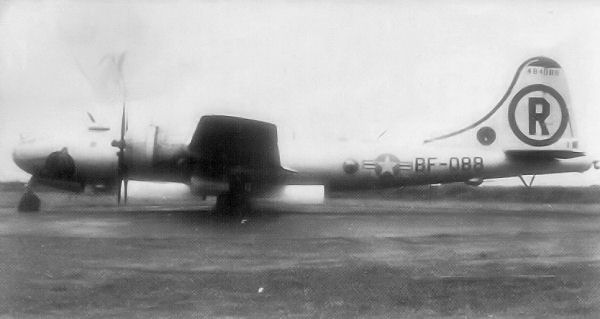
A B-29 of the 28th Bombardment Group, 718th Bombardment Squadron at RAF Scampton

From July 1948, Scampton was home to the 28th Bombardment Group of the United States Air Force (USAF), operating the Boeing B-29 Superfortresses as part of a network of Emergency War Plan Airfields. With its main runway less than 6,000 ft (1,800 m) in length and a chronic shortage of suitable hardstandings, Scampton was far from ideal as a base for the thirty USAF and RAF B-29 Superfortresses, the latter's known as "Washington B.1". In January 1949, as circumstances changed, the USAF squadrons were withdrawn and RAF Scampton was handed back to the RAF.

=== Cold War ===
==== 1950s ====
During this period RAF Scampton was supporting four English Electric Canberra squadrons; No. 10 Squadron, No. 18 Squadron, No. 21 Squadron and No. 27 Squadron. The Canberras moved out in 1955 when the station was earmarked as a V-bomber base, in the case of Scampton, the Avro Vulcan. This required extensive new ground facilities, including a high security area for the storage and maintenance of nuclear weapons and heavy-duty hardstandings for the aircraft.

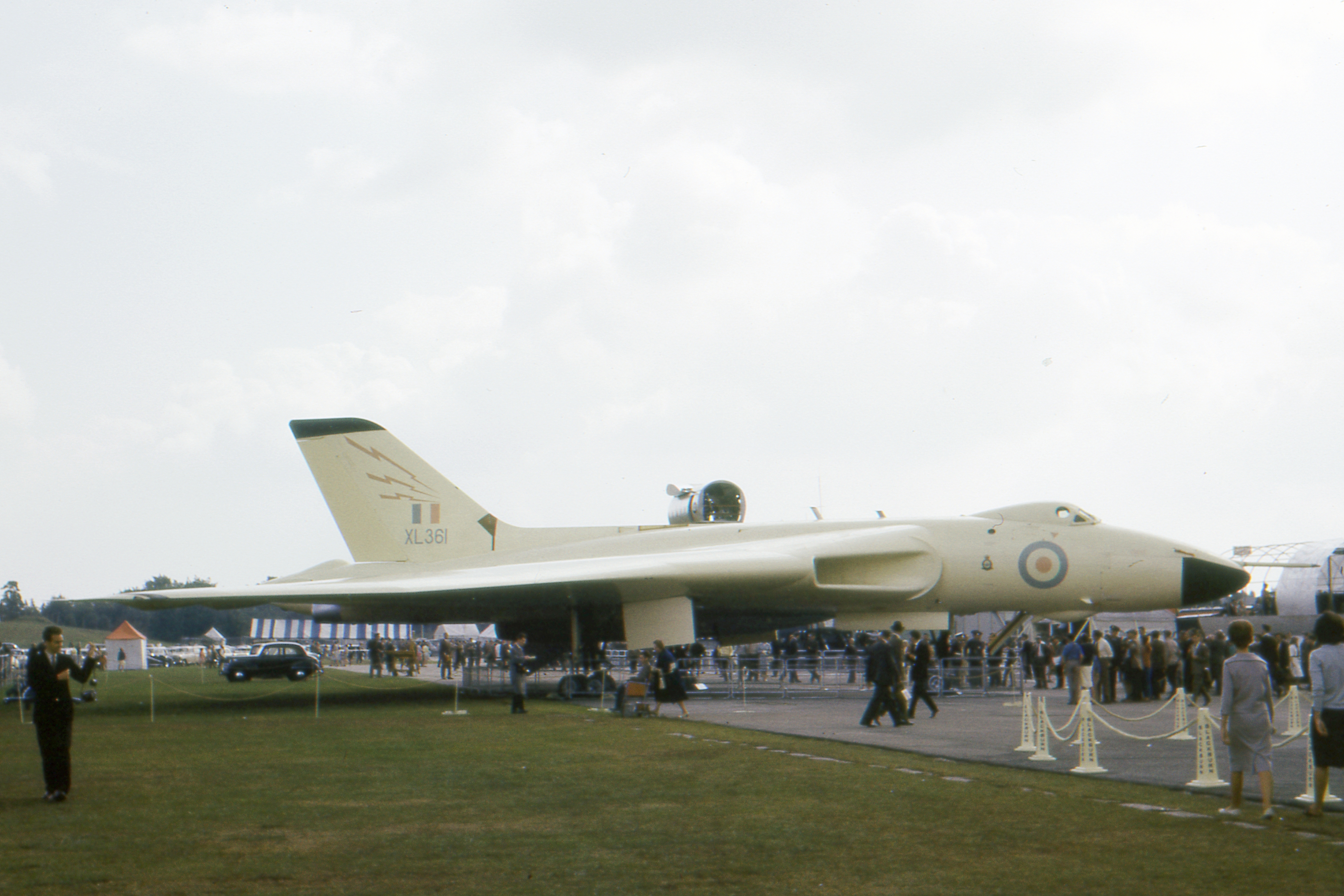
An Avro Vulcan B.2 of 617 Squadron

The first nuclear weapons to be delivered to Scampton arrived during 1958 and comprised twenty kiloton (20kt) atomic bombs given the Rainbow Code, Blue Danube. They were replaced by the smaller Yellow Sun Stage 1 (Mk.1) which were the first of the UK's operational thermonuclear weapons. The development of the stand-off nuclear missile Blue Steel required the construction of new specialist buildings: the Missile Servicing and Storage Building (MSSB) which was erected between the main hangars and the airfield, and the highly volatile High Test Peroxide (HTP) and kerosene fuel storage buildings which were located at some distance from the MSSB.

Additional structures and parts of the layout were also altered. In particular the runway was rearranged to a NE/SW (current designation alignment 04/22) and extended to 9,000 feet (2,740 m). This caused the runway to project beyond the north east corner of the base and required the re-routing of Ermine Street (A15), the most noticeable artificial landscape feature in the area and the historic boundary for such elements as parish boundaries and field systems. Trees along the former tree-lined avenue to Hackthorn Park were also removed between the old line of Ermine Street and the end of the runway. The eastward bulge in the A15 road can still be seen north of Lincoln.

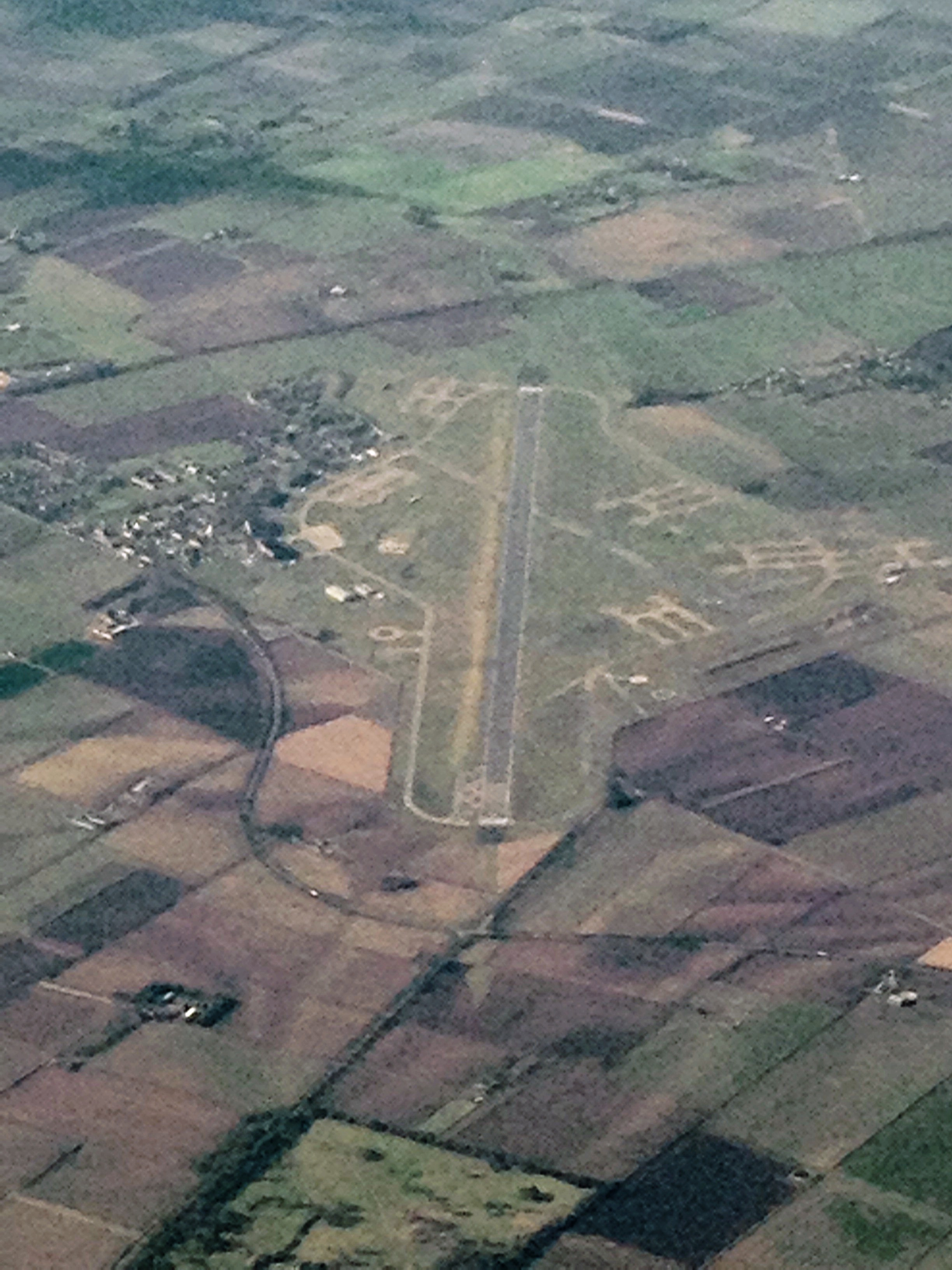
Aerial view of RAF Scampton, March 2016. The developments undertaken at the station during the Cold War are evident, including the alteration to the course of the A15 (Ermine Street).

During the Cold War, the airfield developed its current form, imposing on the landscape in a much more spectacular way. Its extent was no longer bounded by existing field boundaries, but by the shape required for the runway extension. This caused the south-west and north-west corners of the base to jut out from the earlier rectangular plan. Areas of hard standing with associated Operational Readiness Platforms (ORPs) were also provided as were technical buildings. The Unit Storage buildings to the far north of the site were constructed for storage and maintenance of nuclear bombs. Upon the introduction of the Blue Steel stand-off missile, new buildings were constructed just to the north-east of the hangars, to develop, maintain and fuel the missiles. A new control tower was constructed close to these buildings to provide a view of the newly expanded runway.

The work undertaken increased the land area of the station to 370 hectares (920 acres) acres. On completion No. 617 Squadron returned to their former home, re-forming in May 1958.

==== 1960s–1980s ====
In October 1960, No. 83 Squadron arrived at Scampton from RAF Waddington and equipped with the Vulcan B.2. Together with No. 27 Squadron and No. 617 Squadron, who by this time had also taken delivery of the Vulcan, the "Scampton Wing" was formed, the aircraft equipped with the Blue Steel stand-off missile.

On 30 June 1968, Blue Steel operations at Scampton were terminated, as the Royal Navy, with the submarine launched Polaris missile, assumed responsibility for the UK nuclear deterrent. Scampton squadrons were assigned to the tactical nuclear and conventional bombing roles. This led to the disbandment of No. 83 Squadron in August 1969, however in December 1969 No. 230 Operational Conversion Unit moved to RAF Scampton from RAF Finningley.

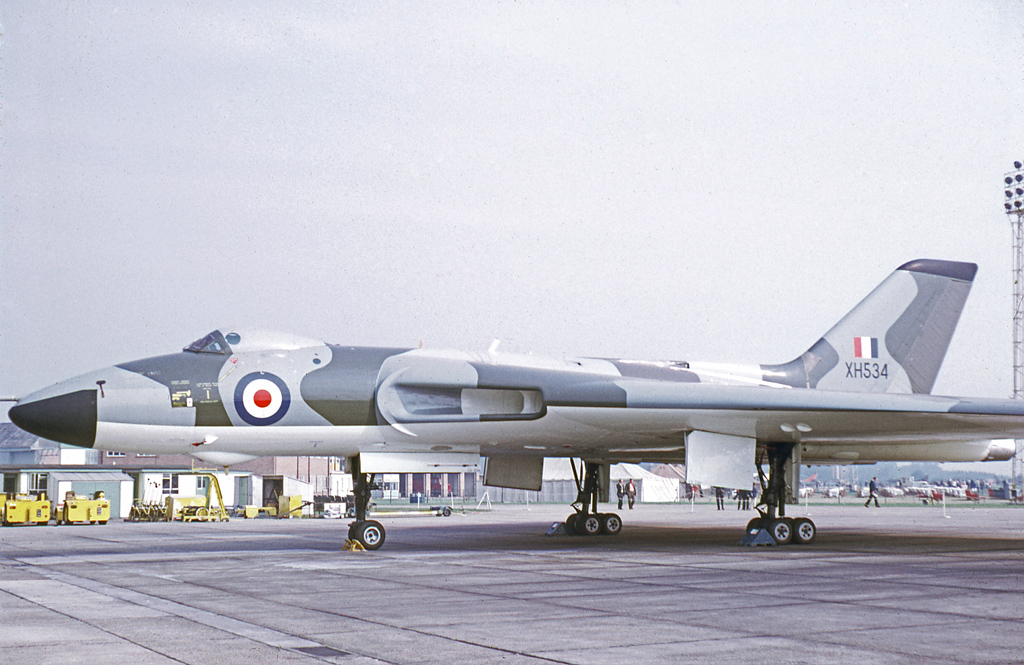
Avro 698 Vulcan B.2 XH534 of 230 Operational Conversion Unit

Part of the post-war development and upgrading of the station, in common with many other RAF stations at the time, saw the establishment of a primary school for the children of those personnel stationed on the base. Located to the south of the base entrance, and adjacent to the eastern perimeter fence, the current school was built in 1961 and replaced the makeshift schooling which had been provided in the Officer's Mess since 1951. The official opening of the school took place on 24 November 1961, and the first children attended the school in January 1962. The buildings are typical of small primary schools built in the 1960s, with a flat roof, large windows and uniformly one storey high. There are several prefabricated extensions which present an informal building layout.

Individual unit allocations were re-introduced in 1971, and throughout the decade Scampton continued to be home to No. 27 Squadron, No. 617 Squadron and No. 230 Operational Conversion Unit, with No. 35 Squadron joining them from RAF Akrotiri in 1975.

With disbandment of No. 230 Operational Conversion Unit and the cessation of No. 617 Squadron's Vulcan operations in 1981, followed by the cessation of Vulcan flying at Scampton by No. 27 Squadron and No. 35 Squadron in 1982, Scampton was transferred to RAF Support Command and became home to the Central Flying School (CFS) in 1983. This role for the station saw the CFS operating such aircraft as the BAC Jet Provost, Scottish Aviation Bulldog and the Short Tucano, sharing the air space with the Hawker Siddeley Hawks of the Red Arrows. A further addition to the complement of the station occurred in 1984 with the arrival of the Tornado Radar Repair Unit. The first Jet Provost retired during March 1988 due to the replacement of the type by the Short Tucano T.1.

=== Post-Cold War ===
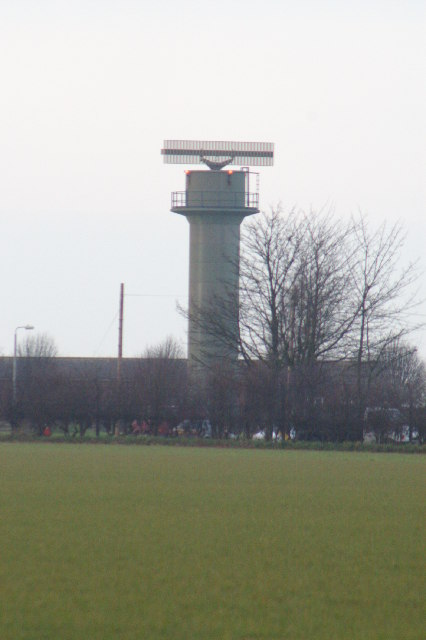
Radar Tower RAF Scampton

==== 1990s ====
In August 1990, RAF Scampton became home to the Joint Arms Control Implementation Group, a joint service organisation responsible for overseeing the implementation of the Control of Armed Forces in Europe Treaty, the Chemical Weapons Convention, Intermediate Nuclear Forces Treaty, Treaty on Open Skies and the Vienna Document.

In 1996, Scampton was mothballed under the Front Line First programme, with the CFS moving to RAF Cranwell. The decision was initially taken to close the base completely along with RAF Finningley, this being confirmed by Nicholas Soames MP in a statement to the House of Commons on 25 March 1995. This would end the Red Arrows 12 year residency (1983 to 1995), and began a 6 year period of "Care & Maintenance" inactivity with the base largely unused.

==== 2000s and the second closure ====
Opposition to the planned closure was strong and a group was formed called "Save our Scampton" (SOS), backed by the Lincolnshire Echo, the County Council and the MP for Gainsborough and Horncastle, Edward Leigh. One plan put forward for the base following its proposed redundancy involved turning the site into a prison, but this plan was not continued with.

The Red Arrows, though, continued to train in the airspace surrounding the airfield (Restricted Zone EG R313) and accommodation at Scampton continued to be used as overflow from RAF Waddington. During this intervening period 110 of the post-war non-commissioned officer married quarters were sold to Welbeck Estate Group who had previously acquired technical and domestic sites at RAF Hemswell, married quarters at RAF Faldingworth and RAF Strike Command Headquarters at RAF Bawtry.

RAF Scampton received the Freedom of Lincoln on 14 May 1993.

=== 21st century ===
Following concerns over capacity and flight safety at RAF Cranwell, the then current home of the Red Arrows, several other training and flying squadrons and units, the decision was taken to remove RAF Scampton from "Care & Maintenance" status and reopen the base, and initially return the Red Arrows, as well as introduce and relocate over time other functions and units, heightening the importance and presence of this historic base. The great influx in personnel and units into Scampton demanded a degree of upgrades and modernisation to much of the office and domestic housing, but during in-depth investigations a further report by the Defence Estates Organisation was published, citing the original cost estimate had more than doubled to £4.5Bn as a result of the substantial amount of remedial work needed as significant amount of the facilities being unused since the reopening in 2001, and some since the mid 1980s, forcing a halt to the overall scheme.

From January 2001 until early 2023, two years after the UK Ministry of Defence announced that RAF Scampton would permanently close as an RAF base, the Red Arrows were the sole RAF Flying unit stationed there, although a private military aviation contractor, Hawker Hunter Aviation, also shared the airfield. Immediately prior to closure, the Red Arrows relocated to RAF Waddington, and HHA relocated to RAF Leeming.

In 2005 Scampton was again placed under the control of RAF Strike Command, becoming home to the UK Air Surveillance and Control System (ASACS) Control and Reporting Centre (CRC) and Mobile Meteorological Unit (MMU). The No.1 Air Control Centre (No.1 ACC) deployed to Afghanistan in 2006 as part of Operation Herrick, the deployment lasting until 2009.

By 2008, the future once again looked uncertain for Scampton. A decision was taken by the then Labour Government that the base would be "downsized", the Red Arrows would move to RAF Waddington by July 2011 and ASACS would also be relocated from the base taking up residence at RAF Coningsby by 2014. However the Strategic Defence Spending Review and operations in Libya meant the plan was suspended with the decision put on hold pending a further review in 2011. The review concluded that keeping the Red Arrows at Scampton was the best way for them to operate, without affecting other operational flying bases.

In July 2018, the Ministry of Defence announced that Scampton would close and then be sold off with all remaining units relocated to other RAF bases by 2022. In May 2020, it was announced that the Red Arrows would move to RAF Waddington, and No. 1 ACC to RAF Boulmer in Northumberland.

In April 2022, the Aviation Medicine Flight, part of the RAF Centre of Aviation Medicine relocated to Scampton from MOD Boscombe Down after retiring their BAE Systems Hawk T1 aircraft. The moves allowed the flight to continue its work using Hawks operated by the Red Arrows.

On 6 September 2022 a fly past of the Red Arrows and Avro Lancaster bomber aircraft took place in anticipation of the closure of the base in December 2022. During October 2022 the Red Arrows left the base for RAF Waddington. The station closed on 31 March 2023.

In December 2023 challenges against government plans to use the base to house asylum seekers were dismissed at the High Court. West Lindsey District Council had claimed the government's plans were unlawful but judge Mrs Justice Thornton dismissed the claims for a judicial review saying that the government's use of emergency powers to change the legal purpose of the land to house asylum seekers was appropriate "given its argument that they could become destitute if more accommodation was not found beyond the use of hotels." Sir Edward Leigh, the MP for Gainsborough, said he was "disappointed by the result." During September 2024, it was announced that the plans have been scrapped.

== Role and operations ==
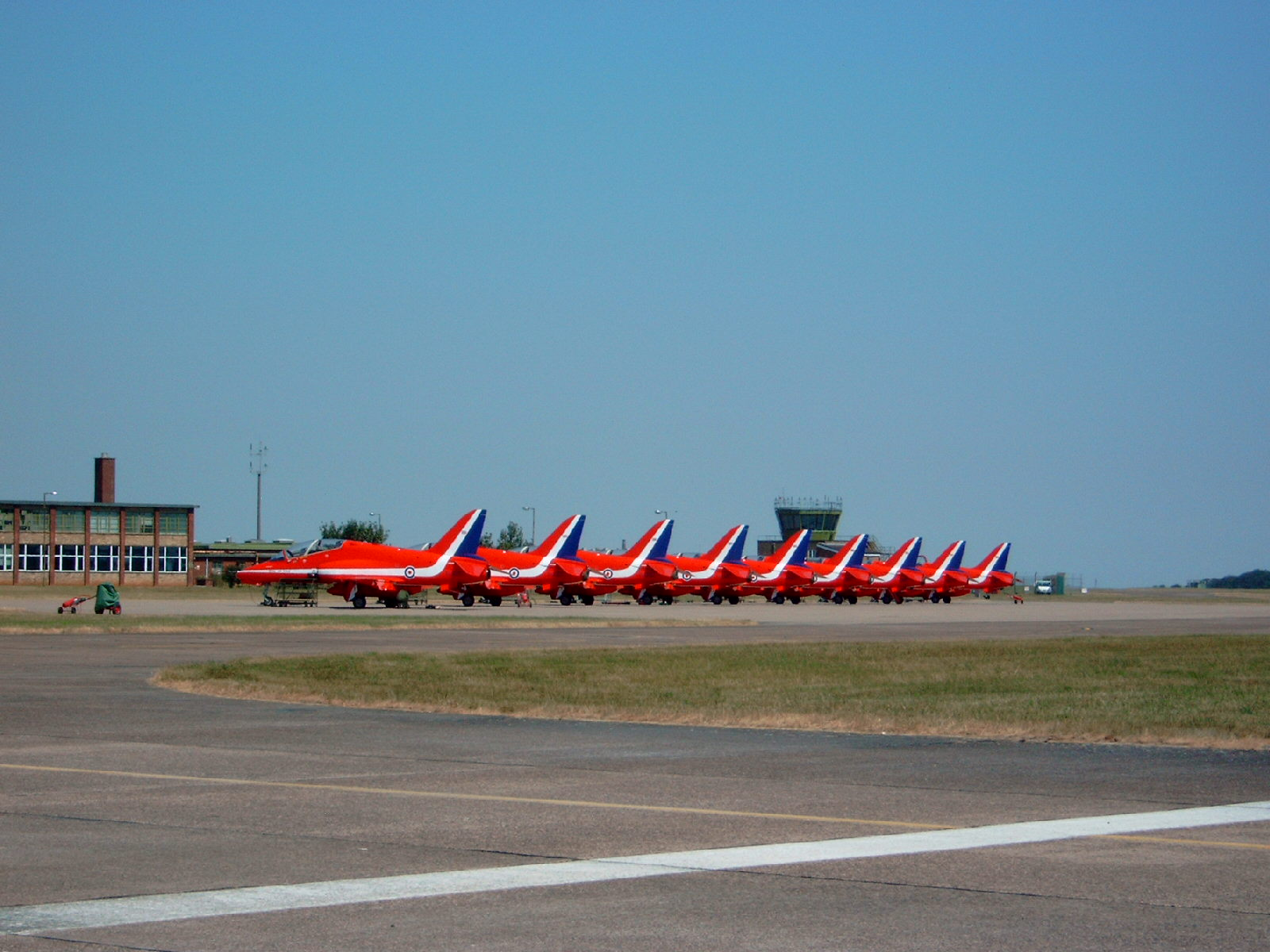
Hawks of the Red Arrows pictured on the flight line at RAF Scampton

RAF Scampton was home to the Control and Reporting Centre Scampton, and the Mobile Meteorological Unit.

The Red Arrows were previously based here and fell under No. 22 Group, although RAF Scampton is actually administered by No. 1 Group. The reason for this being that No. 1 Air Control Centre is a No. 1 Group air defence radar unit, with its permanent operations room, Control and Reporting Centre Scampton, providing assistance to the coverage at RAF Boulmer. RAF Scampton's primary responsibility is training, but it can also provide defence coverage following any technical disruptions at RAF Boulmer. Another responsibility of the station is the provision of deployable command and control capability using containerised equipment that can be delivered worldwide, thereby delivering similar capability to that of the permanent Control and Reporting Centres. No. 1 ACC provides the main operational unit for fighter controllers and aerospace systems operators in the RAF. Operators usually train at the Control and Reporting Centres of Boulmer and Scampton before putting their training into practice at No. 1 ACC or on the Boeing E-3D Sentry.

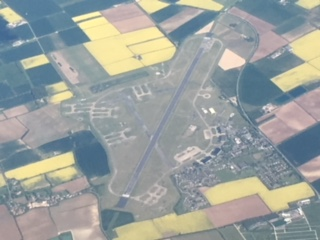
RAF Scampton, May 2017

Until the closing of RAF Kirton in Lindsey, Scampton had administrative control over the satellite site, fifteen miles to the north.

In 2015, part of the accommodation facilities at Scampton underwent significant refurbishment, particularly those of Gibson Barracks. The improvements consisted of replacement of windows, refurbishment and repair of external concrete areas and provision of new escape stairs. The barracks had lain unused for over twenty years, and as a consequence of the neglect had fallen into a state of disrepair. The building was converted into teaching space in the 1980s, but with the subsequent lack of investment on the station the block was allowed to fall into disuse. Following a re-examination of the viability of the base undertaken following the closure of RAF Kirton in Lindsey and the resulting transfer of personnel, as well as the realisation by English Heritage of the importance of the structure and its association with the Dams Raid, it was decided to convert the block back to residential use. Although the building is not listed, it is situated within a site of significant heritage value due to its links to Operation Chastise. The accommodation consists of 48 bedrooms with communal facilities.

=== Met Office meteorological data ===
The Mobile Meteorological Unit was staffed by full-time RAF reserve officers as part of the civilian Meteorological Office, aiding in providing weather and climate information for local forecasts. The unit maintains and repairs equipment for the support of out of area flying operations.

In a typical year at RAF Scampton, the warmest month averages a high of 21.62 °C (70.92 °F), whereas the coldest month averages a low of 1.02 °C (33.84 °F).

The record high at Scampton peaked at 39.9 °C (103.8 °F) in the afternoon of 19 July 2022 during the 2022 United Kingdom heat wave, beating not only the previous local record of 35.1 °C (95.2 °F) from a three-day heatwave on 26 July 2019, but also the former national record of 38.7 °C (101.7 °F), also from July 2019.

The absolute minimum temperature of −15.6 °C (3.9 °F) was recorded on 7 December 2010, during the record-breaking winter of 2010–11 in Great Britain and Ireland. In a year, 48.98 nights register an air frost.

The length of the day varies extremely over the course of the year at Scampton. The shortest day may have 7 hours and 30 minutes of daylight, and the longest as much as 17 hours of daylight. The earliest sunrise is at around 4:30 am in June, and the latest sunrise is at 8:30 am in December. The earliest sunset is at 3:30 pm in December, and the latest is at 9:30 pm in June. Daylight saving time (DST) is observed at Scampton, starting in the spring, lasting about 7 months, and ending in the autumn.

Winters are generally cool with little temperature variation. Heavy snow is rare but snow usually falls at least once each winter. Spring and autumn can be pleasant.

Scampton

Climate chart (precipitation, max. and min. temperature)
J	F	M	A	M	J	J	A	S	O	N	D
49 7 1	39 8 1	36 10 2	45 13 4	46 16 7	65 19 10	59 22 12	57 21 12	53 18 10	58 14 7	60 10 4	54 7 1
- █ Average max. and min. temperatures in °C
- █ Precipitation totals in mm
- Source: Met Office
Imperial conversion
J	F	M	A	M	J	J	A	S	O	N	D
1.9 44 34	1.5 46 34	1.4 50 36	1.8 56 39	1.8 61 45	2.6 66 50	2.3 71 54	2.3 71 54	2.1 65 50	2.3 57 45	2.4 50 38	2.1 45 34
- █ Average max. and min. temperatures in °F
- █ Precipitation totals in inches

Climate data for RAF Scampton, elevation: 57 m (187 ft), 1991–2020 normals
Month	Jan	Feb	Mar	Apr	May	Jun	Jul	Aug	Sep	Oct	Nov	Dec	Year
Mean daily maximum °C (°F)	6.86 (44.35)	7.74 (45.93)	10.24 (50.43)	13.19 (55.74)	16.22 (61.20)	19.10 (66.38)	21.62 (70.92)	21.42 (70.56)	18.37 (65.07)	14.11 (57.40)	9.79 (49.62)	7.02 (44.64)	13.84 (56.91)
Mean daily minimum °C (°F)	1.05 (33.89)	1.02 (33.84)	2.26 (36.07)	4.11 (39.40)	6.97 (44.55)	9.95 (49.91)	12.05 (53.69)	11.96 (53.53)	9.82 (49.68)	7.04 (44.67)	3.55 (38.39)	1.12 (34.02)	5.93 (42.67)
Average rainfall mm (inches)	48.91 (1.93)	38.62 (1.52)	35.87 (1.41)	44.54 (1.75)	45.80 (1.80)	64.96 (2.56)	58.79 (2.31)	57.38 (2.26)	52.96 (2.09)	58.15 (2.29)	59.90 (2.36)	53.52 (2.11)	619.40 (24.39)
Average rainy days (≥ 1.0 mm)	10.63	9.49	8.79	8.97	8.90	9.61	9.58	9.38	9.44	10.41	11.86	11.04	118.10
Mean daily daylight hours	8.2	9.9	12.0	14.1	15.9	16.9	16.4	14.7	12.6	10.5	8.6	7.6	12.3
Source 1: Met Office
Source 2: Weather Spark (daylight hours), World Weather Online

== RAF Scampton Victoria Cross recipients ==
During the station's history, three personnel based at RAF Scampton have been recipients of the Victoria Cross.

=== Roderick "Babe" Learoyd ===
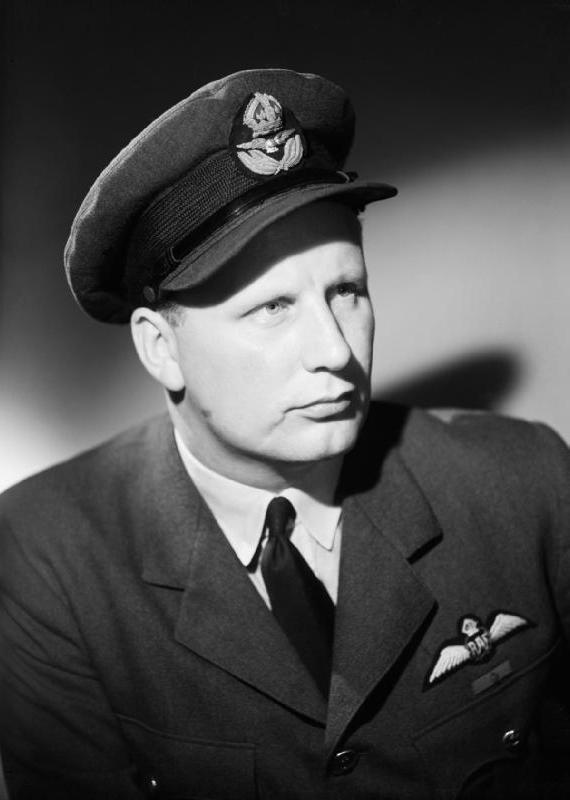
Wing Commander. Roderick Alastair Brook Learoyd VC

On 12 August 1940, No. 83 Squadron's aircraft were part of a raid against the Dortmund-Ems Canal. Two aircraft had been lost due to anti-aircraft fire prior to Wing Commander Roderick 'Babe' Learoyd making his attack, which would involve an attack at low level. During his attack, Learoyd's aircraft was caught in the searchlights, taking two hits in one wing. Despite this Learoyd was still able to provide his bomb aimer with a steady platform in order to deliver his bombs. Learoyd then nursed the Hampden back to England, arriving in the vicinity of Scampton at 02:00. Although the aircraft was flyable, its hydraulic systems had been damaged and the wing flaps were inoperable. The undercarriage indicators had also failed and rather than risk a landing in the dark, Learoyd circled for three hours before making a landing at first light. He was awarded the Victoria Cross for his courage, skill and determination.

=== John Hannah ===
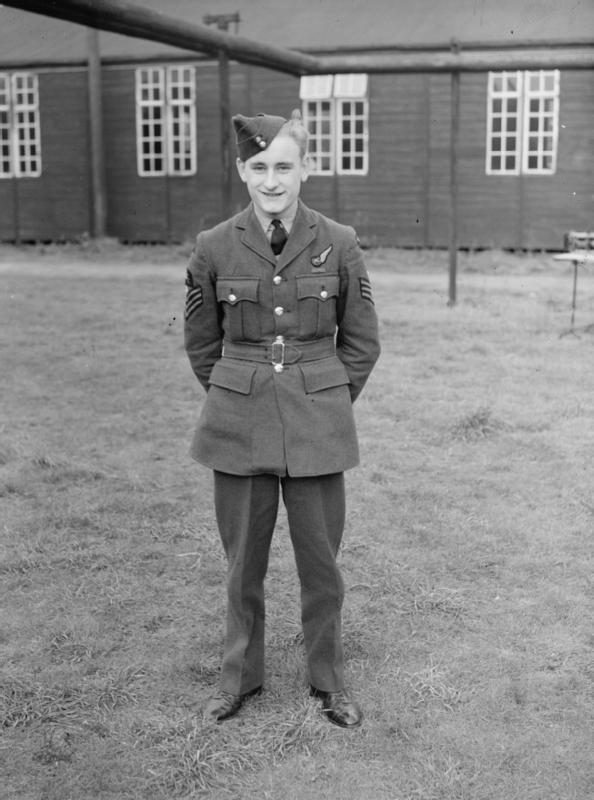
John Hannah VC

Wireless Operator/Air Gunner Flight Sergeant John Hannah was also a member of No. 83 Squadron. On 15 September 1940 his aircraft was involved in a raid on a target near Antwerp during which the Hampden received a hit in the bomb bay, leading to an explosion and serious fire. Both Hannah's position and that of the rear gunner were engulfed in fire, and although the rear gunner had bailed out, Hannah elected to remain at his post, fighting the fire with extinguishers, and when these expired his log book.

He successfully prevented the fire from reaching the aircraft's ruptured fuel tanks, despite ammunition exploding and the floor beneath him melting. Although severely burned, Hannah forced his way forward to the navigator's station, only to find the navigator had also baled out. He then passed the navigation logs and charts to the pilot and assisted him in navigating the Hampden back to Scampton.

=== Guy Gibson ===
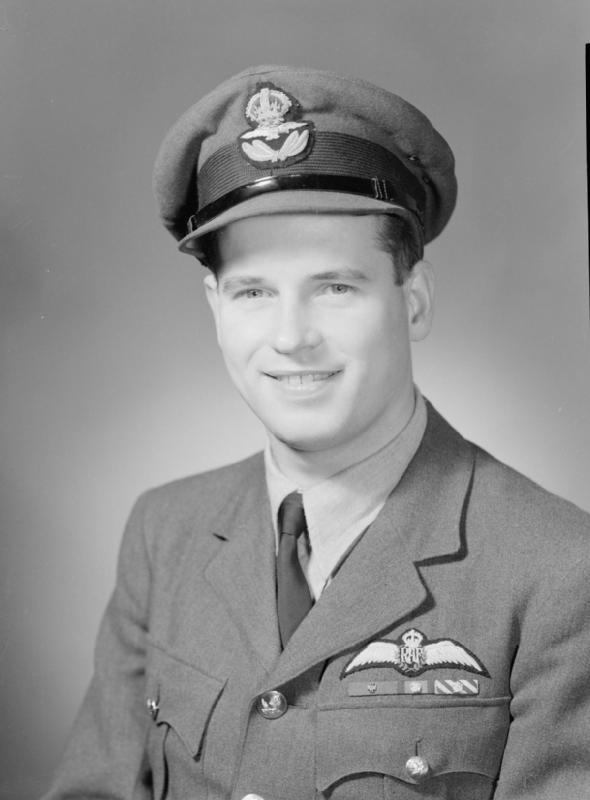
Operation Chastise (the Dambusters' Raid) 16–17 May 1943 MH6673

On the night of 16–17 May 1943, Wing Commander Gibson led No. 617 Squadron on the raids against the Ruhr Dams, Operation Chastise. The task was fraught with danger and difficulty. Gibson personally made the initial attack on the Möhne Dam. Descending to within a few feet of the water and taking the full brunt of the anti-aircraft defences, he delivered his attack with great accuracy.

Afterwards he circled very low for 30 minutes, drawing the enemy fire on himself in order to leave as free a run as possible to the following aircraft which were attacking the dam in turn. Wing Commander Gibson then led the remainder of his force to the Eder Dam where, with complete disregard for his own safety, he repeated his tactics and once more drew on himself the enemy fire so that the attack could be successfully developed.

== Former station commanders ==
- Group Captain John C Russell (1936–38)
- Wing Commander W A B Bowen-Buscarlet (1938)
- Group Captain O C Bryson (1938–39)
- Group Captain E C Emmett (1939–40)
- Group Captain Hugh S Walmsley (1940–41)
- Group Captain W J M Akerman (1941)
- Group Captain R H S Spaight (1941–42)
- Group Captain John N H Whitworth (1942–43)
- Group Captain Adolphus D Davies (1943–44)
- Group Captain John W F Merer (1944)
- Group Captain C R D L Lloyd (1944–46)
- Group Captain P J Harris (1946–48)
- Group Captain Thomas A B Parselle (1948)
- Group Captain H J Pringle (1948–51)
- Group Captain G A G Johnson (1951–53)
- Group Captain David J P Lee (1953–55)
- Group Captain Hubert P Connolly (1955)
- Squadron Leader R C Wood (1955–57)
- Group Captain Stafford P Coulson (1957–60)
- Group Captain Harry Burton (1960–62)
- Group Captain Jack Garden (1962–63)
- Group Captain K G Hubbard (1963–64)
- Group Captain R G Wakeford (1964–65)
- Group Captain Allen H Mawer (1965–68)
- Group Captain D Jack Furner (1968–69)
- Group Captain T M Fennell (1969–71)
- Group Captain L E H Scotchmer (1971–73)
- Group Captain F R Lockyer (1973–74)
- Group Captain John B Fitzpatrick (1974–75)
- Group Captain G H Burleigh (1975–78)
- Group Captain C A Herbert (1978–79)
- Group Captain V L Warrington (1979–82)
- Group Captain A P Singleton (1982–83)
- Group Captain I Thomson (1983–85)
- Group Captain R G Curry (1985)
- Group Captain Allan Blackley (1985–87)
- Group Captain R Gowring (1990-2?)
- Group Captain C C N Burwell (1994–95)
- Wing Commander D Bolsover (2000–01)
- Wing Commander W J Ramsey (2001–05)
- Wing Commander David Middleton (2005–05)
- Group Captain Tim L J Bishop (2005–06)
- Wing Commander Archie McCallum
- Wing Commander Alex Stylianides
- Wing Commander Richard D Turner
- Wing Commander Michael Harrop (2014–16)
- Wing Commander Joanne Campbell (2016–2018)
- Wing Commander James Parker (2018–2020)
- Group Captain Neill Atkins (2020–2023)

== Scampton Airshow ==
RAF Scampton International Air Show
- Status: Defunct
- Genre: Air show
- Dates: 9–10 September 2017
- Venue: RAF Scampton
- Country: U.K.
- Established: 2017
- Website: http://scamptonairshow.com/airshow

On 19 February 2016, an announcement was made concerning plans for the creation of an airshow to take place at Scampton in 2017.

In the wake of the decision to discontinue with a display at RAF Waddington following the 2014 airshow, there was a high degree of dissatisfaction regarding the announcement. The airshow had become one of the leading attractions in the UK during the summer months, the 2014 airshow at Waddington witnessed numbers in the region of 135,000 attending the display weekend, raising approximately £260,000 for Service and local charities.

Following on from the announcement in February 2016 of the station staging an airshow in 2017, it was announced that the Royal Air Force Charitable Trust, organisers of the Royal International Air Tattoo had agreed to organise a new event at Scampton. However, the requirements for the upgrading of the base's infrastructure so as to be able to stage such an event meant that no airshow was able to take place until 2017.

During the late spring of 2016, preparations continued for the organisation of the event and an official announcement was made at the Station Commander's Reception on 26 May. The dates for the airshow were confirmed on 10 November, been set for 9–10 September 2017.

=== 2017 ===
The first airshow to be held at RAF Scampton since 1991 saw participation of 104 aircraft, with 41 taking part in the flying displays and 63 forming the static line-up. Aircraft types ranged from a display by a vintage Avro Anson to a modern Typhoon, with visitor numbers in the region of 50,000. Guests of honour at the event were Battle of Britain veteran Terry Clark, and former Scampton resident Johnny Johnson.

=== 2018 ===
On 14 December 2017, the organisers of the Scampton Airshow issued a statement with regard to the 2018 event. The statement read that following the 2017 airshow the organisers required time to reflect on certain issues and to look at how the airshow could be improved. In view of this, the statement continued that there were still areas of the event which required improvement and consequently there would be no running of the Scampton Airshow in 2018. The statement did however conclude that the organisers, following the review, intend to run an improved Scampton Airshow in 2019.

== Heritage ==
=== Station badge and motto ===
RAF Scampton's badge, awarded in December 1958, features a gold coloured long-bow and arrow against the backdrop an azure coloured roundel. The roundel represents the RAF, whilst the bow and arrow form a topographical representation of the station. The arrow acts as the lengthened runway; the bow-string is the former route of Ermine Street located near the station; and the bow the re-aligned road required to accommodate the extended runway.

The station's motto (Armatus non lacessitur) is in Latin and translates as "An armed man is not attacked".

=== Archaeology ===
The remnants of a Roman Villa are situated to the south-west of RAF Scampton. Excavation of the site and its subsequent documentation were undertaken for Channel 4 television's Time Team programme.

=== Dambusters commemorations ===
1991

In May 1991, Scampton was the venue for a BBC broadcast of Friday Night is Music Night, set to coincide with the anniversary of the Dambusters Raid. The transmission was from No. 1 Hangar and of added interest was the arrival of a British Airways Boeing 747-400 (G-BNLT). The aircraft, a new addition to the British Airways fleet, had been named City of Lincoln in a ceremony held at RAF Coningsby after which it was flown to RAF Scampton. City of Lincoln is the same name as that bestowed on Lancaster PA474 of the Battle of Britain Memorial Flight (BBMF) and both aircraft featured in the show, the BBMF's Lancaster in No. 1 Hangar forming the focal point of the concert. The Boeing 747 was parked on Echo Dispersal and was made available for members of the audience to visit.

1993

A special commemorative BBC television broadcast of Songs of Praise marking the 50th anniversary of Operation Chastise was staged at Scampton in 1993, in which Boeing 747-400 City of Lincoln returned to the base. Presented by Sally Magnusson, the event was attended by 2,500 invited guests, including several veterans of the raid as well as Richard Todd.

2013

Marking the 70th anniversary of the raid in 2013, the BBC again featured a programme from Scampton, hosted by Dan Snow. Attended by Les Munro and "Johnny" Johnson, the telecast featured the Lancaster of the BBMF as well as two Panavia Tornados of No. 617 Squadron.

In addition there was also a broadcast by BBC Radio 2 of The Chris Evans Breakfast Show in which Evans conducted interviews with various station personnel and current members of No. 617 Squadron. Following the show Evans boarded Lancaster PA474 of the BBMF and flew from Scampton to Biggin Hill which was the venue for a special edition of Friday Night is Music Night as part of the commemoration.

=== Gate guardians ===
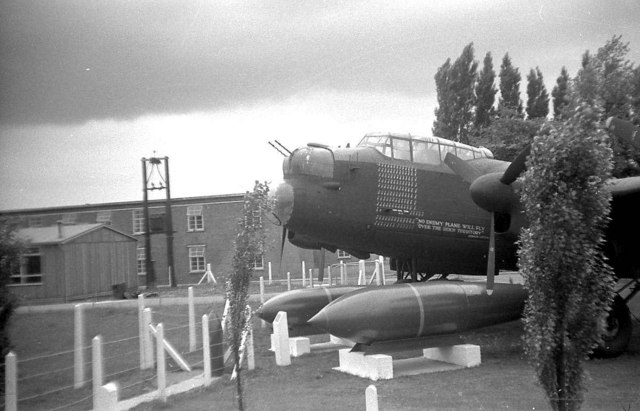
Lancaster R5868 during its tenure as gate guardian at RAF Scampton

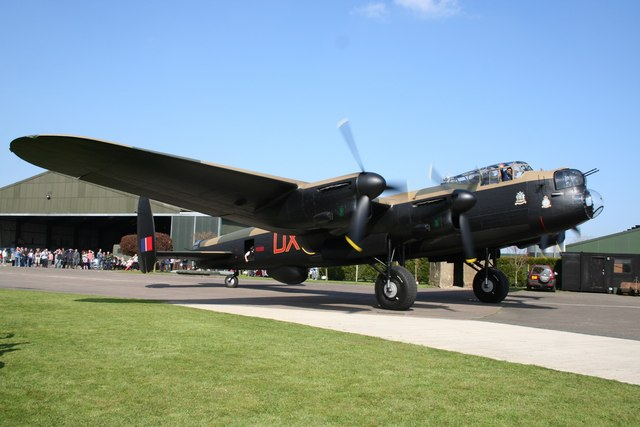
Avro Lancaster Just Jane, former gate guardian at RAF Scampton, now the focal point of the Lincolnshire Aviation Heritage Centre

In all there have been three gate guardians at RAF Scampton during the station's history.

==== Lancaster R5868 Q-Queenie/S-Sugar ====
The first was Avro Lancaster S-Sugar along with the large Tallboy and Grand Slam bombs which the type had carried. It was placed on display at the main gate of Scampton in No. 467 Squadron markings in 1960. With the arrival of 83 Squadron at Scampton in October 1960, it was noted that S-Sugar had strong links to the squadron. It transpired that the aircraft had originally served at Scampton with No. 83 Squadron and was given the squadron code OL-Q (Q-Queenie). When No. 83 Squadron converted to the Lancaster Mk.III in September 1943, Lancaster Q-Queenie was transferred to No. 467 Squadron who were then based at RAF Bottesford. The aircraft was subsequently re-coded PO-S (S-Sugar).

Lancaster R5868 was dismantled at Scampton in November 1970, by personnel from No. 71 Maintenance Unit RAF. It was removed and is now on permanent exhibition at the Royal Air Force Museum London, Hendon.

==== Lancaster NX611 Just Jane ====
The next gate guardian was another restored Lancaster, repatriated from a French island in the South Pacific. This later Lancaster, Just Jane NX611, is now at the Lincolnshire Aviation Heritage Centre at the former RAF East Kirkby.

==== Hawk XX306 ====
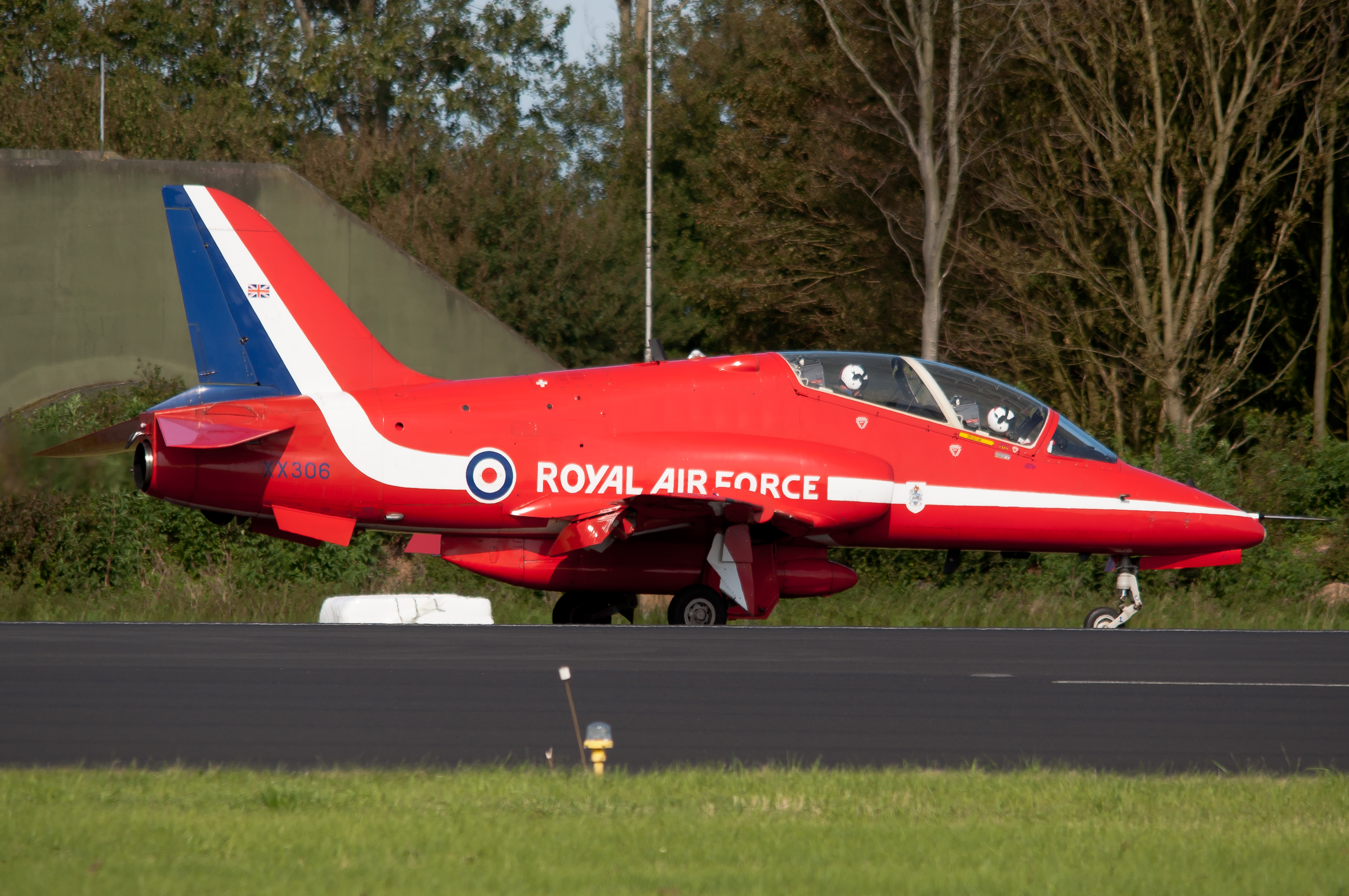
XX306 during its service life

The last gate guardian at Scampton was a former Red Arrows Hawk T.1 XX306. Positioned in front of the Station Headquarters, it was unveiled by the then Station Commander Wing Commander Michael Harrop during a ceremony on 12 October 2015.

The aircraft was constructed at BAe Dunsfold and handed over to the RAF on 23 May 1980. The jet spent two months at RAF Valley before flying to RAF Kemble (the Red Arrows' previous home) and joined the Squadron on 3 July 1980, being one of the first of its type operated by the Red Arrows following their conversion from the Folland Gnat at the end of the 1979 display season.

During its operational life XX306 amassed a total flying time of 7,378hrs 15 mins accumulating 13,007 landings. It was retired from the aerobatic team on 20 October 2012, having last been used in a display on 26 September of that year.

=== RAF Scampton Heritage Centre ===
RAF Scampton was home to a heritage centre, detailing the station's history and displaying several hundred artefacts including a Blue Steel Missile. More ambitious plans were put forward in 2013 to turn part of RAF Scampton into a major tourist attraction. This project was driven by Lincolnshire County Council. It had been estimated that the total investment required for the complete plan would be £80 million, of that total £40 million would be required to complete the first phase, which concerned two hangars and an exhibition hall. Such amounts would have required substantial monetary grants from the National Lottery in order for it to succeed.

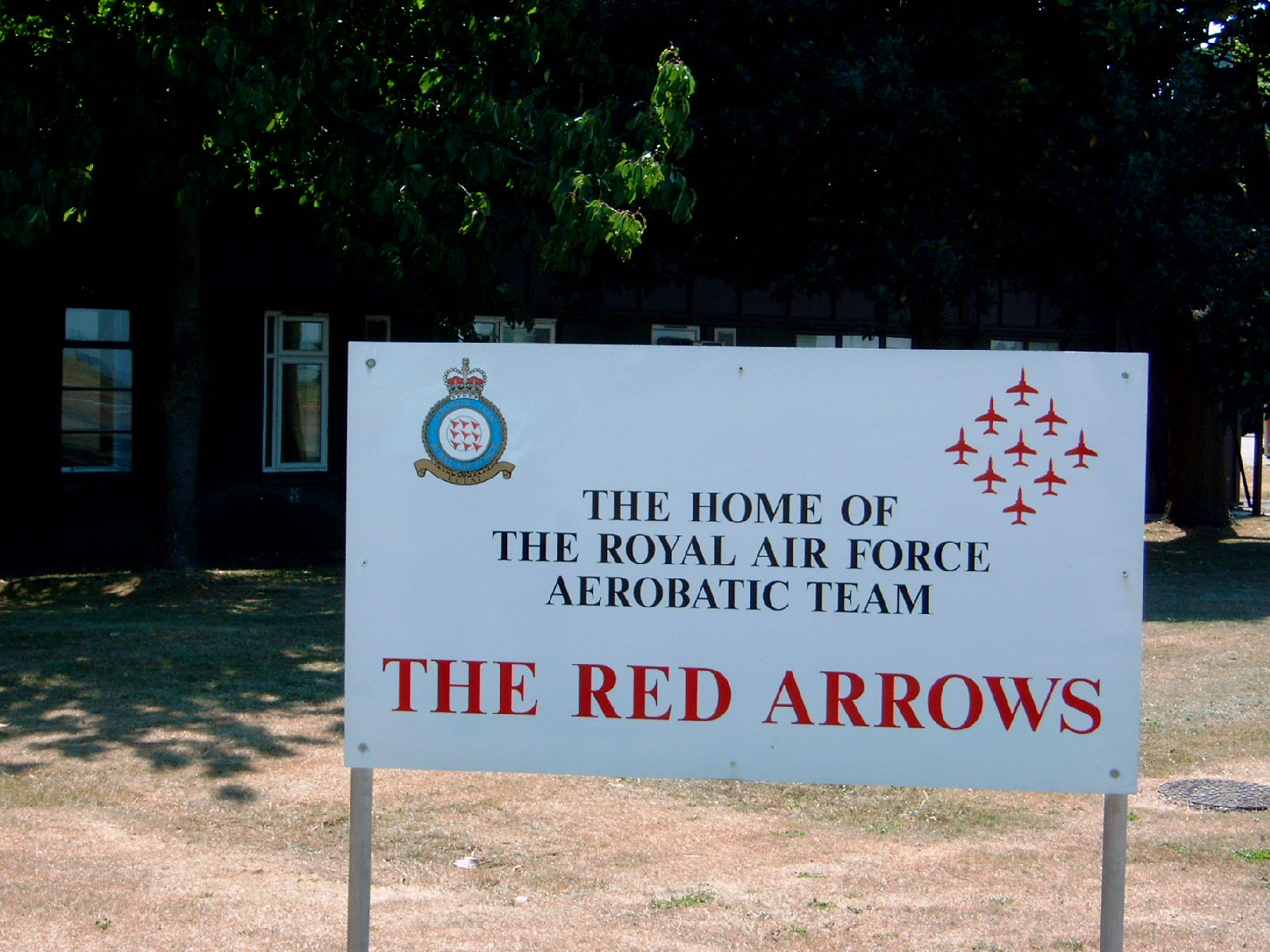
RAF Scampton: The former home of the Red Arrows

The plans would have converted two of the station's four hangars into exhibition halls and the Officer's Mess into a hotel. Council officials held talks with the RAF and the Defence Infrastructure Organisation, which managed the Ministry of Defence's estate, regarding the proposals which estimated the creation of 100 jobs locally and annual visitor numbers in the region of 200,000.

An independent study commissioned by Lincolnshire County Council in October 2013, concluded that the proposal was viable and had the potential to succeed.

Exhibitions would focus on the Red Arrows, aviation in the First and Second World Wars, the Cold War as well as Lincolnshire's aviation engineering heritage and the Dambusters Raid. It was hoped the project would secure the future of the station and complement the proposals to establish an air show at Scampton. It was hoped that the facility would have been opened by 2018 in order to mark the centenary of the creation of the RAF. In July 2020 campaigners were hoping to establish a charitable trust to raise funds for the scheme.

== See also ==
- List of V Bomber dispersal bases
- List of surviving Avro Lancasters
