= RAF Kirton in Lindsey =

Former Royal Air Force station in Lincolnshire, England

RAF Kirton in Lindsey Rapier Barracks USAAF Station 349
- Scunthorpe, Lincolnshire in England

Site information
- Type: Royal Air Force station sector station 1940-42
- Code: KL
- Owner: Ministry of Defence
- Operator: Royal Air Force; United States Army Air Forces
- Controlled by: RAF Fighter Command 1940-?? * No. 9 Group RAF * No. 12 Group RAF * No. 81 (OTU) Group RAF; RAF Flying Training Command; Eighth Air Force

Location
- Shown within Lincolnshire RAF Kirton in Lindsey (the United Kingdom)
- Coordinates: 53°27′41″N 000°34′41″W

Site history
- Built: 1939/40
- Built by: John Laing & Son Ltd
- In use: May 1940 – 2013
- Battles/wars: European theatre of World War II, Cold War, War in Afghanistan

Airfield information
- Elevation: 61 metres (200 ft) AMSL
Runways
Direction	Length and surface
00/00	Grass
00/00	Grass

Royal Air Force Kirton in Lindsey or more simply RAF Kirton in Lindsey is a former Royal Air Force station located 15 miles (24 km) north of Lincoln, Lincolnshire, England.

It is a custom of the RAF (inherited from the RFC) to name its bases after the nearest railway station, possibly to simplify the process of issuing Rail Warrants to personnel posted there. By that token, the site should be RAF Kirton Lindsey, Kirton Lindsey being the name of the nearby railway station constructed in 1849. No.255 Squadron's Operations Record Book (ORB) consistently uses that version of the name. So does the airfield's separate ORB, from the date of the site's WWII creation (15 May 1940) through to May 1941. After mid-1941 and the departure of No. 255 Squadron, the name RAF Kirton-in-Lindsey begins to appear in the site's own records; eventually dominating.

On 25 March 2013 it was announced the MOD planned to dispose of the airfield and technical facilities with only accommodation remaining, which was emptied later that year. The airfield used to host No. 1 Air Control Centre (1ACC), the RAF's only deployable ground-based early warning and air control radar unit, which was parented by RAF Scampton.

== First World War ==
The Royal Flying Corps and later Royal Air Force airfield at Kirton in Lindsey was used during the First World War from December 1916 to June 1919. Although referred to as Kirton Lindsey this airfield was actually outside the town, north along the B.1398. The airfield was used by B Flight of 33 Squadron from nearby Gainsborough until June 1918; 33 Squadron was a home defence squadron equipped with the Bristol Fighters and Avro 504s.

With the end of the war, the airfield was returned to agricultural use.

== RAF Fighter Command use ==
The airfield was built on a new site by John Laing & Son in the late 1930s. It opened in May 1940 as a Fighter Command Station covering the NE of England during the Second World War. Many Boulton Paul Defiant and Supermarine Spitfire Squadrons rested here for a short time during the Battle of Britain.

Sgt Ian Clenshaw was the first pilot casualty during the Battle of Britain, when he flew on a dawn patrol from here on 10 July 1940, and was killed in what is generally regarded as a disorientation accident.

The airfield was home of Number 71 Squadron of the RAF's Fighter Command. The squadron was made up of mostly American pilots and was one of the "Eagle Squadrons" of American volunteers who fought in the Second World War prior to the American entry into the war. 71 Squadron was assigned the squadron code XR.

The squadron arrived at the station in November 1940 and by January the squadron was declared combat ready. They began flying convoy escorts over the North Sea. On 9 April No. 71 was moved to RAF Martlesham Heath.

The following units were also here at some point:

- No. 2 Gliding Centre RAF
- No. 2 Grading Unit (Airwork) RAF (1952-53)
- No. 2 Officer Cadet Training Unit RAF
- No. 4 Initial Training School RAF
- No. 6 Anti-Aircraft Co-operation Unit RAF
- No. 6 Air Crew Holding Unit RAF
- No. 7 Anti-Aircraft Co-operation Unit RAF
- No. 7 Flying Training School RAF
- No. 16 Personnel Transit Centre
- No. 22 Gliding School RAF
- No. 101 Flying Refresher School RAF
- No. 1489 (Fighter) Gunnery Flight RAF
- No. 2702 Squadron RAF Regiment
- No. 2733 Squadron RAF Regiment
- No. 2773 Squadron RAF Regiment
- Aircrew Transit Unit RAF
- Airwork Grading Unit RAF
- Central Synthetic Training Establishment RAF
- Flying Refresher School RAF
- Link Trainer School RAF
- Officer Cadet Training Unit RAF

== RAF units and aircraft ==
Dates	Unit	Aircraft	Variant	Notes
1942	No. 43 (China-British) Squadron RAF	Hawker Hurricane	I	Short stay in September before the squadron moved to North Africa
1941	No. 65 (East India) Squadron RAF	Supermarine Spitfire	IIA	February to September operating coastal patrols before moving south
1940–1941	No. 71 (Eagle) Squadron RAF	Hawker Hurricane	I	Eagle Squadron
1940	No. 74 Squadron RAF	Supermarine Spitfire	IIA	Short stay August/September 1940
1940	No. 85 Squadron RAF	Hawker Hurricane	I	Short stay October/November 1940
1941	No. 121 (Eagle) Squadron RAF	Hawker Hurricane	I and IIB	Eagle Squadron formed May 1941 before moving to RAF North Weald
1941–1942	No. 133 (Eagle) Squadron RAF	Supermarine Spitfire	IIA then VA and VB	Eagle Squadron
1941	No. 136 Squadron RAF	Hawker Hurricane	IIA and IIB	Squadron formed August 1941 before moving to the Far East
1942	No. 169 Squadron RAF	North American Mustang	I	Detachments from Doncaster
1940	No. 222 (Natal) Squadron RAF	Supermarine Spitfire	I	Two short stays
1940	No. 253 (Hyderabad State) Squadron RAF	Hawker Hurricane	I	May to July
1940–1941	No. 255 Squadron RAF	Boulton Paul Defiant; Hawker Hurricane	I I	
1940	No. 264 (Madras Presidency) Squadron RAF	Boulton Paul Defiant	I	
1943	No. 302 Polish Fighter Squadron	Supermarine Spitfire	VB	
1942; 1942–1943	No. 303 Squadron RAF	Supermarine Spitfire	VB	
1942	No. 306 Polish Fighter Squadron	Supermarine Spitfire	VB	
1940	No. 307 Polish Night Fighter Squadron	Boulton Paul Defiant	I	Formed September 1940
1941–1942	No. 409 Squadron RCAF	Bristol Beaufighter	IIF	Detachment from Coleby Grange
1941	No. 452 Squadron RAAF	Supermarine Spitfire	I and IIA	
1942	No. 457 Squadron RAAF	Supermarine Spitfire	VB	Short stay before move to Australia.
1942	No. 486 Squadron RNZAF	Hawker Hurricane	II	Formed March 1942
1940–1941	No. 616 (South Yorkshire) Squadron AAF	Supermarine Spitfire	I	

== USAAF use ==
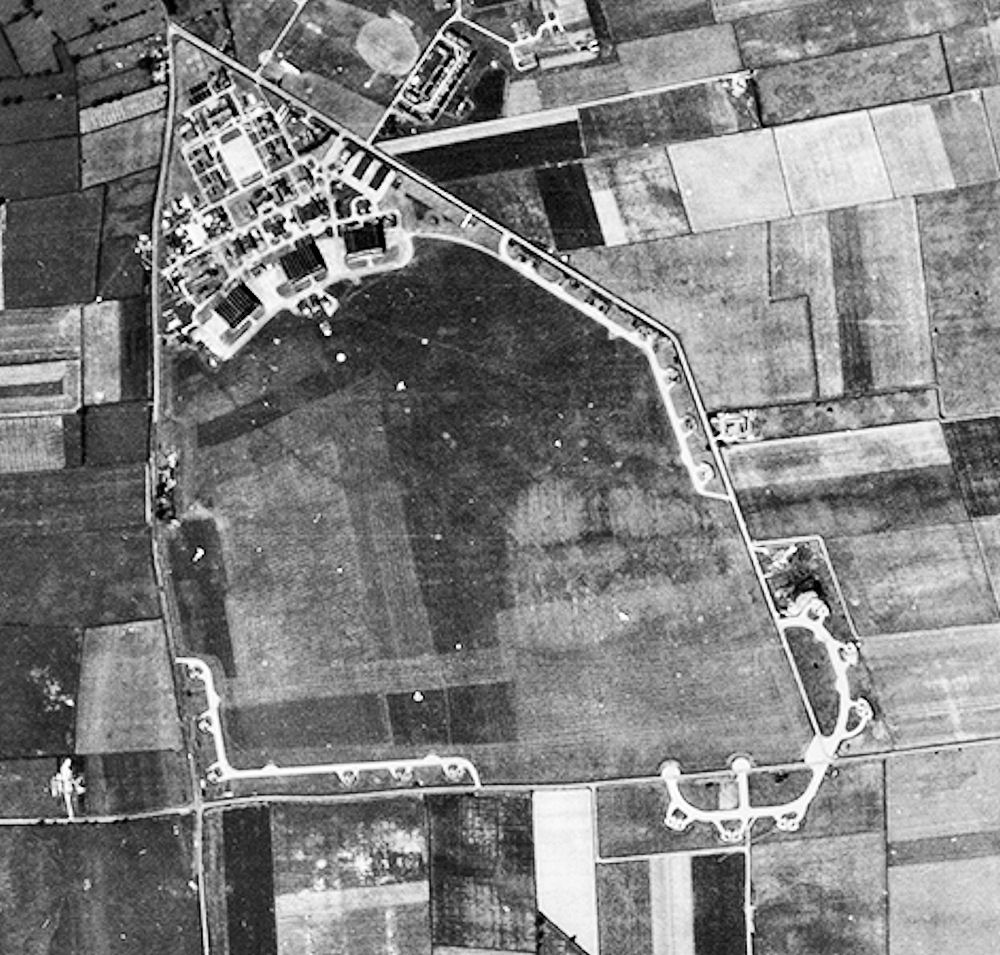
Aerial photograph of RAF Kirton in Lindsey showing, the technical site with three C-Type hangars to the top (north), 27 July 1948.

Kirton in Lindsey was allocated to the United States Army Air Forces Eighth Air Force in 1942. It was assigned USAAF Station number 349, code "KL"

=== 1st Fighter Group ===
Beginning in June 1942, the 94th Fighter Squadron of the 1st Fighter Group at RAF Goxhill used the station for training with Lockheed P-38 Lightnings. The squadron remained until October.

=== 81st Fighter Group ===
In October 1942, the 91st Fighter Squadron of the 81st Fighter Group used the station for training. The squadron arrived in Europe from Muroc Army Air Field, California flying Bell P-39 Airacobras. The squadron remained until December then departed for French Morocco as part of Twelfth Air Force.

== RAF Flying Training Command use ==
In May 1943, the station was returned to RAF control for use as a Fighter Operational Training Unit with Spitfires of No. 53 OTU from Llandow. Caistor and Hibaldstow being used as satellite airfields. Kirton in Lindsay was a training station and had the following units stationed at it, during the Cold War

- May 1946 to 1948, No. 7 Service Flying Training School RAF with Oxfords from Sutton Bridge, moved to Cottesmore.
- 1948 to 1952, Used by non-flying RAF Training Schools.
- 1952 to 1957, No. 2 ITS (later renamed No. 1 ITS), an Officer Cadet Training Unit with de Havilland Tiger Moths.
- 1957 to 1959, Airfield closed and on Care and Maintenance (but still used by 643 Volunteer Gliding School).
- August 1959 to December 1965, Reopened with No. 7 School of Technical Training and 643 Volunteer Gliding School.

== British Army use ==
In 1966, control of Kirton in Lindsey was transferred to the British Army.

The 1st Battalion, Royal Northumberland Fusiliers arrived in June 1966 and were immediately sent to Aden from August 1966 to June 1967. On 23 April 1968, the battalion was amalgamated into the Royal Regiment of Fusiliers and the camp was known as 'St. Georges Barracks'. The regiment completed tours of Northern Ireland, before departing for Gibraltar in 1971.

In 1972 the site was passed on to the Royal Artillery and the station was renamed 'Napier Barracks'. In 2004 22 Regiment Royal Artillery left Kirton in Lindsey, to be absorbed into 39 Regiment at Albemarle Barracks, Northumberland.

Due to the Royal Artillery association, the Army Cadet Force detachment which is still housed there has the Royal Artillery cap badge.

== Return to RAF control ==
In 2004, the station was returned to RAF control and became the home of No. 1 Air Control Centre (No. 1 ACC), a deployable Air Surveillance and Control System, which relocated from RAF Boulmer. The unit refurbished the hangars and associated buildings on the technical site, as well as reopening the Junior Ranks accommodation and Mess. Across the road the historic Officers' Mess was reopened as a Combined Officers, Warrant Officers, and SNCOs' Mess. The associated Service Families Accommodation was also occupied as well as the Gymnasium. In 2005, the opening of the Control and Reporting Centre at nearby RAF Scampton increased personnel numbers significantly. Junior Ranks from both stations were accommodated on the RAF Kirton in Lindsey technical site, SNCOs re-occupied the former SNCOs Mess at RAF Scampton and the Officers' Mess at RAF Kirton in Lindsey reverted to Officers only. At this time the unit became a satellite administered by, RAF Scampton.

In 2012, the technical site was vacated when No. 1 ACC moved to RAF Scampton. During the same period the Junior Ranks Mess, accommodation blocks and dental centre were all closed. Junior Ranks were moved to accommodation at RAF Scampton, while the Officers' Mess again became a Combined Mess for Officers, Warrant Officers and SNCOs. The Gym and a number of Service Families Accommodation were retained until 2014 when the final occupants vacated and the houses were handed back to Annington Homes who put them on the open market. The technical site was also sold by the MOD in 2014 to Acorn Recyclers. Parts of the site are now being used for Airsoft games.

== Present day ==
After 85 years, on 11 June 2025 RAF Kirton started to be demolished for 350 homes to be built on the site. Also, the landlord requires the Trent Valley Gliding Club, which operated on the main runways, to leave the site by the end of this year, so that it can be returned to agricultural use. The club has said they are looking for alternative locations.

Despite this, the site was visited on 22 May 2025 by the Stowarzyszenie Lotników Polskich (Association of Polish Pilots), who were travelling through Europe to celebrate the 80th anniversary of the end of World War II and to commemorate the wartime Polish pilots. RAF Kirton was one of the many bases used by wartime Polish pilots.

== See also ==
- List of former Royal Air Force stations
