= RAF East Kirkby =

Former RAF station in Lincolnshire, England

RAF East Kirkby
- Near East Kirkby, Lincolnshire in England
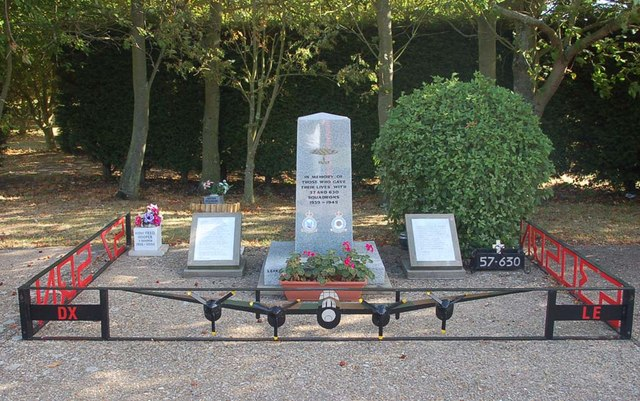
- Memorial to Number 57 and 630 Sqn, East Kirkby

Site information
- Type: Royal Air Force station * Parent station 1943-44
- Code: EK
- Owner: Ministry of Defence
- Operator: Royal Air Force; United States Air Force
- Controlled by: RAF Bomber Command * No. 5 Group RAF

Location
- Shown within Lincolnshire RAF East Kirkby (the United Kingdom)
- Coordinates: 53°08′20″N 00°00′02″W

Site history
- Built: 1942/43
- Built by: John Laing & Son Ltd
- In use: August 1943 - April 1970
- Battles/wars: European theatre of World War II; Cold War

Airfield information
- Elevation: 12 metres (39 ft) AMSL
Runways
Direction	Length and surface
00/00	Concrete
00/00	Concrete
00/00	Concrete

Royal Air Force East Kirkby or more simply RAF East Kirkby is a former Royal Air Force station near the village of East Kirkby, south of Horncastle in Lincolnshire, just off the A155. The airfield is now home to the Lincolnshire Aviation Heritage Centre.

== History ==
RAF East Kirkby opened on 20 August 1943 as a RAF Bomber Command Station and is situated not far from RAF Coningsby.

Stationed at East Kirkby were:

- No. 57 Squadron RAF (5 Group) which flew the Avro Lancaster, 27 August 1943 – 25 November 1945.
- No. 630 Squadron RAF (5 Group) which also flew the Lancaster, 15 November 1943 – 18 July 1945.

RAF East Kirkby served also as the headquarters of No. 5 (Bomber) Group RAF in command of satellite stations at RAF Strubby, RAF Spilsby, RAF Hemswell and RAF Manby.

The following units were also here at some point:

- No. 55 Base RAF (April 1944 - November 1945)
- No. 93 Maintenance Unit RAF (? - December 1950)
- No. 139 Squadron RAF
- No. 350 Wing RAF (May 1945) became No. 553 Wing RAF (May 1945 - ?)
- No. 351 Wing RAF (May 1945) became No. 554 Wing RAF (May 1945 - ?)
- 3931st Air Base Group

=== Operations ===
On 17 April 1945, near the end of the Second World War, a No. 57 Squadron Lancaster was being loaded with bombs when a fully armed 1000lb (450kg) bomb was unintentionally dropped onto the tarmac. Because the bomb had had its fuse inserted it detonated, setting off the rest of the Lancaster's bombload. A massive explosion killed three airmen, injured 16 others, wrote off six other Lancasters beyond repair and badly damaged a nearby aircraft hangar.

The final wartime raid from East Kirkby was flown on 25 April 1945. In total, 212 operations were carried out during the war, from which 121 Lancasters did not return. Another 29 aircraft were lost due to operational crashes or accidents.

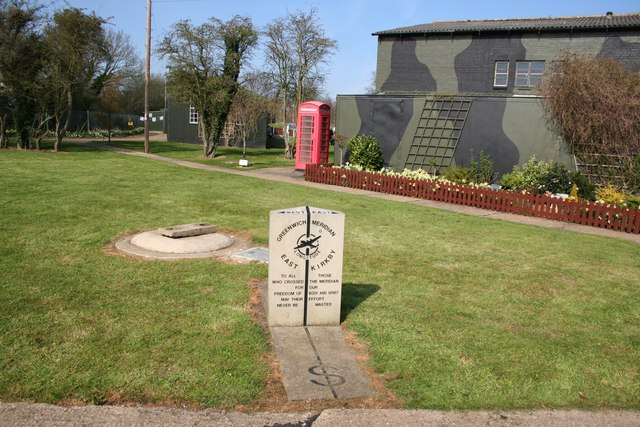
The Greenwich meridian passes through the airfield.

=== Post war use ===
No. 630 Squadron disbanded in July that year and its place was taken by No. 460 Squadron RAAF from RAF Binbrook. This squadron joined No. 57 for transfer to the Far East as part of Tiger Force. In the 1950s, the airfield was used by the United States Air Force for Air Rescue squadrons for four years. The station (code name Silksheen) closed in 1958. It was sold by the government in 1964.

== Aviation museum ==
The airfield became the site of broiler sheds, and is now home to an air museum, Lincolnshire Aviation Heritage Centre. The centre's main exhibit is an Avro Lancaster Mk.VII, with registration NX611, named Just Jane after the popular wartime comic character.

The airfield was featured in a 1980s BBC series about World War II airfields. Much of the runway is still intact today but mainly used by local farmers as hard standing and by model aircraft enthusiasts. Occasional civilian light aircraft have landed on the remaining runway and the airfield still appears on Civil Aviation Maps as a diversion emergency landing location. A memorial to the fallen can be found outside the main gate where the guard house once stood.

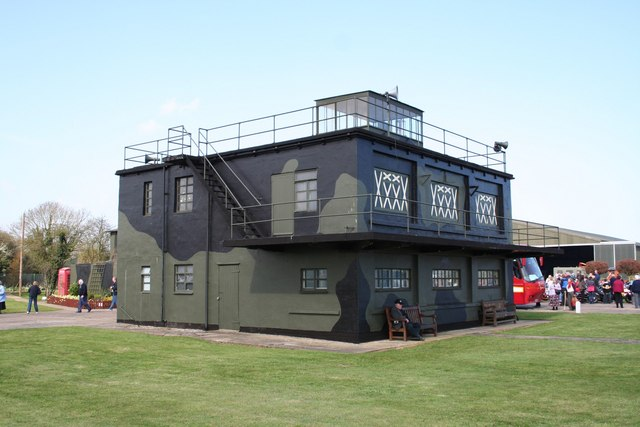
East Kirkby watchtower

The control tower is claimed to be haunted and the base was investigated by the Most Haunted team in 2003 in the first episode in their third series on Living TV. Yvette Fielding and her team investigated the museum and site for alleged paranormal activity.

In 2008 the museum opened an unlicensed part-grass and part-concrete landing strip for visiting aircraft.
