= RAF Boulmer =

Royal Air Force station in Northumberland, England

RAF Boulmer
- Near Boulmer, Northumberland in England
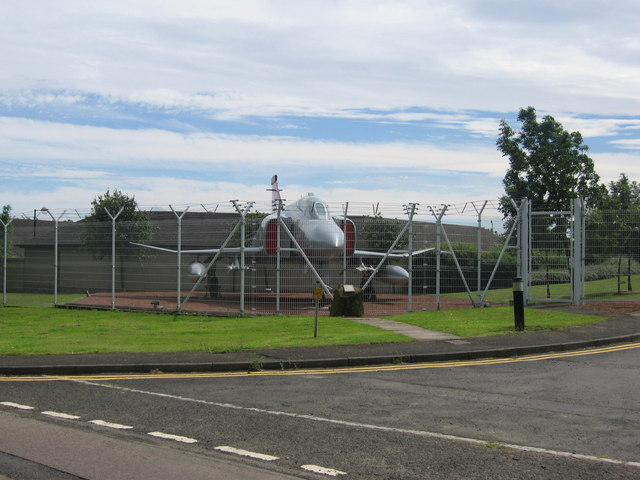
- A Phantom aircraft as gate guardian

- Semper in exubitu vigilans (Latin for 'Always the Vigilant Sentry')

Site information
- Type: Royal Air Force station
- Owner: Ministry of Defence
- Operator: Royal Air Force
- Controlled by: No. 2 Group RAF
- Open to the public: No
- Size: 1,000 Service personnel, civil servants and contractors
- Website: www.raf.mod.uk/our-organisation/stations/raf-boulmer/

Location
- Shown within Northumberland
- Coordinates: 55°25′19″N 001°36′12″W

Site history
- Built: 1940 (Original site); 1953 (Current site)
- In use: 1940-1945 (Original site); 1953-present (Current site)

Garrison information
- Current commander: Wing Commander Joe Redhead

Royal Air Force Boulmer or more simply RAF Boulmer /ˈbuːmər/ (Note: The majority of Royal Air Force personnel pronounce the station as Bulmer, however, the local version is pronounced Boomer.) is a Royal Air Force station near Alnwick in Northumberland, England, and is home to the Air Command and Control Force, 19 Sqn - Control and Reporting Centre (CRC) Boulmer, 20 Sqn - Operational Conversion Unit (OCU) and 144 Signals Unit (SU).

The School of Aerospace Battle Management and support staff was based there until 26 July 2019; it has since moved to RAF Shawbury. Until 30 September 2015, it was also home to A Flight, No. 202 Squadron RAF, who flew the Westland Sea King HAR.3 in the SAR (Search and Rescue) role.

== History ==
=== Second World War ===
In 1940 a decoy airfield was set up near the village of Boulmer to divert German attacks from nearby Royal Air Force (RAF) airfields such as RAF Acklington. As the air threat to the United Kingdom receded, the decoy airfield, with its grass runways and plywood and canvas Hurricanes, was abandoned.

In March 1943 RAF Boulmer was reopened as a satellite airfield to house the advanced flights of No. 57 Operational Training Unit RAF (a Supermarine Spitfire training unit based at RAF Eshott, Boulmer's parent unit).

Part of the airfield formed the basis of a caravan site with the runway and taxiway being used as an access road to the site. The site remains and is called Seaton Park.

=== Cold War ===
By 1950, the threat of the atomic bomb had caused a serious rethink in the organisation of air defence and a plan, codenamed ROTOR, was brought in to replace many of the existing stations with new protected underground operations rooms. The site chosen for one of these new underground Ground-controlled interception (GCI) stations was close to the former RAF Boulmer which had been returned to agriculture at the end of the Second World War.

The station was to have a two-level underground operations room designated as an R3. The R3 was never intended to survive a direct hit from a nuclear weapon but was designed to withstand a near miss from Russian bombing with 2,200 lb armour-piercing high explosive bombs dropped from 35,000 feet.

A target date for completion of the station was set as 21 August 1953 and although not complete, the station opened on time with limited capabilities using an American AN/FPS3 long-range search radar and an AN/TPS10 height finder. The station became known as 500 Signals Unit under the control of RAF Acklington and part of 13 Group - the station motto 'Semper in excubitu vigilans' is taken from 500 Signals Unit's badge. On completion of the R3 in September 1954 the station became fully operational.

In the autumn of 1957 RAF Boulmer was designated a Group Control Centre, with responsibility for the RAF Radar Stations at Buchan and Killard Point. By 1958, Boulmer was selected to be upgraded with the installation of the more modern-high powered Type 84 Surveillance radar. This increased the range of detection and was able to penetrate the latest Soviet jamming technology.

In 1971 Border Radar was established at Boulmer: this was a joint military/civil facility providing air traffic control services to co-ordinate civil and military traffic. Although still operational until the late 1980s, the unit closed when all Area Air Traffic Services were centralised between West Drayton and Prestwick.

By 1974 the Station had evolved to become both a Sector Operations Centre (SOC) and Control and Reporting Centre (CRC).

In 1978 RAF Boulmer took on an additional role as a search and rescue station following the closure of RAF Acklington, a role that it fulfilled until 30 September 2015. Initially the station was equipped with Westland Whirlwind helicopters; however, in December 1978 the station was re-equipped with Westland Sea King aircraft.

The next major change came in 1982 when the R3 bunker was vacated and work begun to upgrade it to an R3A. During this period the CRC was relocated to an above ground facility while the work was carried out.

In 1990, Boulmer's links with Air Defence were reinforced by the arrival of the School of Fighter Control from RAF West Drayton. Following an extensive refurbishment the bunker was returned to operations in 1993. However, with the end of the Cold War the CRC was used in a standby role only with the homeland defence task being conducted from RAF Buchan and RAF Neatishead.

=== Post Cold War ===
In 1994, No. 1 Air Control Centre (No 1 ACC) reformed at RAF Boulmer, providing the Royal Air Force with deployable fielded air command and control capability.

In 2002, the Station began a major refurbishment of the underground bunker and installation of new equipment as part of the UKADGE Capability Maintenance Programme (UCMP). Valued at £60 million, the first phase of the programme was declared operational at RAF Boulmer on 16 August 2004.

In 2004 RAF Boulmer's newly refurbished NATO Control and Reporting Centre (CRC) took over all air defence functions previously administered by the CRCs at RAF Buchan and RAF Neatishead.

In late July 2004 it was announced that RAF Boulmer would close by 2012, with the majority of its functions transferring to RAF Scampton. The first action taken in response to this announcement was for No 1 ACC to move to RAF Kirton in Lindsey, a former RAF Fighter Command airfield in Lincolnshire. This would bring the Air Command and Control elements of the Air Surveillance and Control System (ASACS) (the new CRC at RAF Scampton) geographically closer to the ISTAR elements such as the E3 Sentry AWACS force at RAF Waddington. No 1 ACC's move to Kirton was completed in early 2005.

On 10 January 2008 it was announced that a study had been conducted into where to locate the elements of the Air Surveillance and Control System (ASACS). The results concluded that the best option in both financial and operational terms is to retain RAF Boulmer as the ASACS hub and as a result the station would stay open beyond 2012.

'A' Flight was one of the three operational flights of No. 202 Squadron RAF and was based at RAF Boulmer, the Sea King HAR.3 helicopter was used, 'A' Flight provided round-the-clock search and rescue cover for a large area, stretching from Fife in the north to Hartlepool in the south and encompassing the Lake District in the west.

On 30 September 2015 'A' Flight of No. 202 Squadron departed RAF Boulmer and the provision of SAR from RAF Boulmer ceased. SAR is now carried out by HM Coastguard through a contract with Bristow Helicopters.

The RAF School of Aerospace Battle Management (SABM), formerly the School of Fighter Control (SFC), was located at RAF Boulmer from 1990 to 2019. The school became part of the Defence College of Air and Space Operations on its creation in April 2016. The SABM played a central part in delivering the training required for Weapons Controllers and Identification Officers of the Air Operations Branch and airmen and airwomen of the Air and Space Operations Specialists (Aerospace Systems) Trade Group. The school relocated to RAF Shawbury in Shropshire in August 2019.

In 2021, Boulmer's Control and Reporting Centre (CRC) was allocated the No. 19 Squadron number plate.

== Based units ==
The following notable flying and non-flying units are based at RAF Boulmer.

=== Royal Air Force ===
No. 2 Group

- Air Command and Control (Air C2) Force
  - No. 19 Squadron – Control and Reporting Centre
  - No. 20 Squadron – ASACS Operational Conversion Unit
  - No.144 Signals Unit – ASACS Engineering Unit

== Operations ==
RAF Boulmer's mission statement is to 'generate and sustain an operationally agile air command and control capability.'

=== Air Command and Control (Air C2) Force ===
Homeland defence of the UK remains the cornerstone of the ASACS Force Command's operational output. However, the ASACS Force Command also has a wider responsibility in support of deployed operations worldwide. With the stand up of the ASACS Force Command Headquarters at RAF Boulmer in January 2006, the Station Commander also has the operational role of ASACS Force Commander responsible for the generation, sustainment and operational output of the ASACS organisation. According to The Daily Telegraph, there were 187 interceptions between 2005 and 2016.

The Force Elements under the control of the Air C2 Force Commander are:

- 19 Squadron – RAF Boulmer
- 20 Squadron – RAF Boulmer
- 144 Signals Unit – RAF Boulmer
- Remote Radar Head (RRH) Benbecula in the Outer Hebrides
- RRH Saxa Vord in Shetland
- RRH Buchan in Aberdeenshire
- RRH Brizlee Wood in Northumberland
- RRH Neatishead in Norfolk
- RRH Portreath in Cornwall
- RRH Staxton Wold in North Yorkshire

=== Control and Reporting Centre ===
The Control and Reporting Centre (CRC) at RAF Boulmer, named Hotspur, is tasked with compiling a Recognised Air Picture within NATO Air Policing Area 1, and providing tactical control of the Quick Reaction Alert Force. The CRC is manned 24/7 to support NATO and national Quick Reaction Alert requirements. Managing the UK's network-enabled capability for the Homeland Defence task, the CRC also supports the training of Air Surveillance and Control System personnel, UK and NATO partner aircrew for deployment on operations worldwide.

=== Business Management Hub ===
The Business Management Hub is based at RAF Boulmer. Its role is to provide specialist financial support & guidance to the Air C2 Force Command whilst ensuring value for money and compliance with RAF Air Command's Corporate Governance policies.

=== Air Base ===
The Air Base has approximately 100 service and civil servant personnel, who along with a large number of contractors support operations. The Air Base comprises two squadrons: Force Development Squadron which is responsible for all the key elements necessary to deliver Force Development Training, including the Training and Development Flight, Physical Education Section, Regiment Section and the Learning Centre. Personnel Management Squadron which includes Personnel Services Flight, the Service Community Support Officer, HIVE, General Duties Flight and the Medical and Dental Centres. Management Support Squadron which comprises Catering, Retail and Leisure, Estates and Facilities Management, Media and Communications and the Station i-Hub and Central Registry.

== Other facilities ==
RAF Boulmer also has a 25-metre (82 ft) shooting range that is often used by Air Cadets of Durham / Northumberland Wing, ATC using the L98A2 Cadet GP Rifle. The station is the location of a Met Office automatic weather reporting station, used in the extended Shipping Forecast broadcast on BBC Radio 4.

== List of station commanders ==
- June 1953, Squadron Leader E G Holmes.
- July 1955, Wing Commander F V Morello OBE.
- June 1957, Group Captain J B Coward AFC.
- December 1959, Group Captain Cyril Stanley John West DFC (29 January 1918 - 14 March 1977), he had a road accident in March 1962, which killed a doctor.

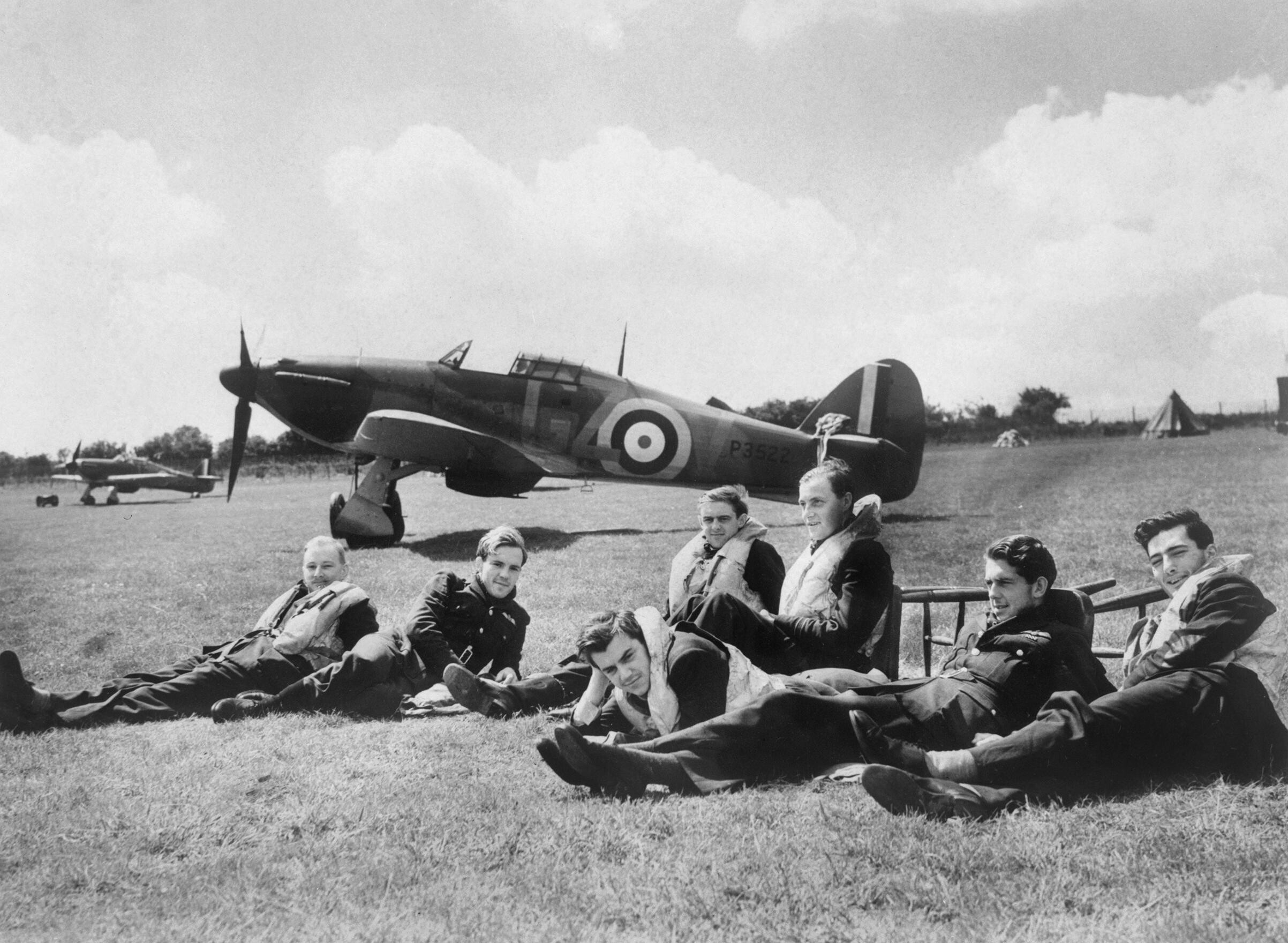
Peter Malam Brothers, third from right

- May 1962, Group Captain H E Walmsley DFC.
- February 1965, Group Captain Peter Malam Brothers CBE DSO DFC (1917-2008), former Battle of Britain pilot with 257 Squadron, and head of 57 Squadron at RAF Waddington, flying the Avro Lincoln.
- September 1965, Group Captain John R Gibbons AFC, aged 42, he attended Birkenhead School, he flew in the war with 103 Squadron.
- September 1966, Group Captain Eric Batchelar, a former wartime fighter pilot with 17 and 135 Squadron.
- April 1969, Wing Commander I Boyd OBE.
- September 1972, Group Captain E P Bennett.
- August 1974, Group Captain James Kenneth Rogers OBE MBIM (20 January 1924 * 18 April 2006), a navigator, from Wrexham, who joined the RAF, after a navigation course in Canada, and flew nightfighter Mosquito aircraft with 169 Squadron at RAF Little Snoring in Norfolk, awarded the OBE in the 1967 Birthday Honours.
- August 1976, Group Captain Peter Graham Botterill OBE AFC, from 1962-64 as Sqn Ldr, he commanded the 74 Squadron, Tiger Squadron, an aerobatic squadron of Lightning aircraft at RAF Leuchars.
- November 1978, Group Captain John Barrie Blakeley OBE.
- February 1981, Group Captain Peter Gordon Naz OBE, he attended Welwyn Garden City Grammar School, where he lived on Beechfield Road.
- January 1983, Group Captain Chris William Bruce OBE.
- January 1985, Group Captain John H W Davis OBE.
- March 1987, Group Captain Richard Cloke AFC FBIM.
- March 1989 Group Captain Simon N Bostock, from Tixall in Staffordshire.
- March 1991, Group Captain Edward W Ward.
- March 1993, Group Captain Tim C Willbond.
- August 1995, Group Captain Mike J Good.
- November 1997, Group Captain Martyn R Bettel OBE ADC BSc MInstAM, attended Harrogate Grammar School from 1963-66.
- February 2000, Group Captain Brian E Rogers MBE.
- May 2002, Group Captain Nick J Gordon MBE MBA FCIPD.
- August 2004, Group Captain Malcolm K Crayford OBE MA.
- November 2006, Group Captain W Jayne Millington MA MA(Oxon) RAF, later Air Commodore, died of cancer aged 55 in May 2017
- January 2009, Group Captain Phil H Cox MA RAF.
- September 2010, Group Captain J B Portlock MA RAF.
- July 2012, Group Captain Paul W Atkinson BA MA CMgr FCMI RAF.
- July 2014, Group Captain Mark S P Coleman MA RAF.
- July 2016, Group Captain Rich G Jacob BA(Hons) RAF.
- September 2018, Group Captain Kevin S Cowieson MA MBA MSc(HRM) BSc RAF.
- August 2020, Group Captain Dave L Keighley MA RAF.
- August 2022, Wing Commander Charlotte M Best BSc(Hons) MA RAF.
- August 2025, Wing Commander Joe Redhead BA(Hons) RAF.

== See also ==
- Improved United Kingdom Air Defence Ground Environment – UK air defence radar system in the UK between the 1990s and 2000s
- List of Royal Air Force stations
- NATO Integrated Air Defence System
