= No. 1 Air Control Centre RAF =

No 1. Air Control Centre
- Organisation badge
- Active: 1965–1982; 1995 – present
- Country: United Kingdom
- Branch: Royal Air Force
- Type: Non-flying unit
- Role: Deployable Air Surveillance and Control system (ASACS) capability
- Part of: Air Command and Control Force
- Station: RAF Boulmer
- Motto: Ever Alert

No. 1 Air Control Centre (also known as 1 ACC) is a deployable mobile command and control unit of the Royal Air Force that is currently based at RAF Boulmer in Northumberland. The unit acts in conjunction with the Control and Reporting Centre (CRC) also at RAF Boulmer, but also detaches staff to overseas locations when the Royal Air Force is engaged in operations. Some of these postings are permanent, such as in the Falklands Islands and at Cyprus.

1 ACC's remit is to protect the United Kingdom's, and deployed airspace, from hostile aircraft.

== History ==
No. 1 Air Control Centre started out as No. 9 Signals Unit (9 SU) at RAF Rattlesden in Suffolk in 1964. A year later on 9 September 1965 it was renamed as No. 1 Air Control Centre, and remained at Rattlesden. In 1967, it moved to RAF Wattisham, where it remained until 1979 until it moved to Nancekuke in Cornwall (later RAF Portreath and then RRH Portreath).

Between 2006 and 2009, No. 1 ACC was deployed to Afghanistan on Operation Herrick.

In 2008, plans were announced in Parliament to relocate 1 ACC from RAF Kirton in Lindsey and the CRC from Scampton to RAF Coningsby in Lincolnshire. Whilst this move did not proceed as intended, 1 ACC moved to RAF Scampton in 2012 and the technical site at RAF Kirton in Lindsey was sold off, although the domestic site was retained for RAF personnel.

In 2018, the RAF announced that RAF Scampton would close by 2022, which would involve moving all units out of the station to other locations. 1 ACC moved to RAF Boulmer in early 2023, just before Scampton’s closure on 31 March 2023.

Staffing of the unit fluctuates with demand and role, but in 2015, the number of personnel at the unit was around 220.

== Role ==
The main role of 1 ACC is to provide deployed air control operations, both in the United Kingdom and on deployed operations worldwide. Whilst working in the United Kingdom, 1 ACC feeds into the CRC at RAF Boulmer and helps to protect UK airspace from hostile aircraft.

== Locations ==
=== Permanent locations ===
==== Current ====
- RAF Boulmer, (2023 - present)
- RAF Scampton, (2013 – 2023)
- Mount Olympus (Cyprus)
- Mount Alice (Falklands)
- Byron Heights (Falklands)
- Mount Kent (Falklands)

==== Historical ====
- RAF Rattlesden, (1965 – 1967)
- RAF Wattisham, (1967 – 1979)
- RAF Portreath, (1979 – 1982)
- RAF Boulmer, (1995 – 2005)
- RAF Kirton in Lindsey, (2005 – 2013)

=== Short deployments ===
- Zambia, (1967)
- Exercise Saif Sareea II, (2001)
- Operation Telic, (2004)
- Operation Herrick, (2006–2009)
