= No. 630 Squadron RAF =

- Active: 15 November 1943 – 18 July 1945
- Country: United Kingdom
- Branch: Royal Air Force
- Type: Inactive
- Role: Bomber Squadron
- Part of: No. 5 Group RAF RAF Bomber Command
- Base: RAF East Kirkby, Lincolnshire
- Mottos: Latin: Nocturna Mors "Death by night"

Insignia
- Squadron Badge heraldry: On an ogress, a Lancaster rose fimbriated
- Squadron Codes: LE (Nov 1943 – Jul 1945)

Aircraft flown
- Bomber: Avro Lancaster; Four-engined heavy bomber

No. 630 Squadron RAF was a heavy bomber squadron of the Royal Air Force during the Second World War.

== History ==
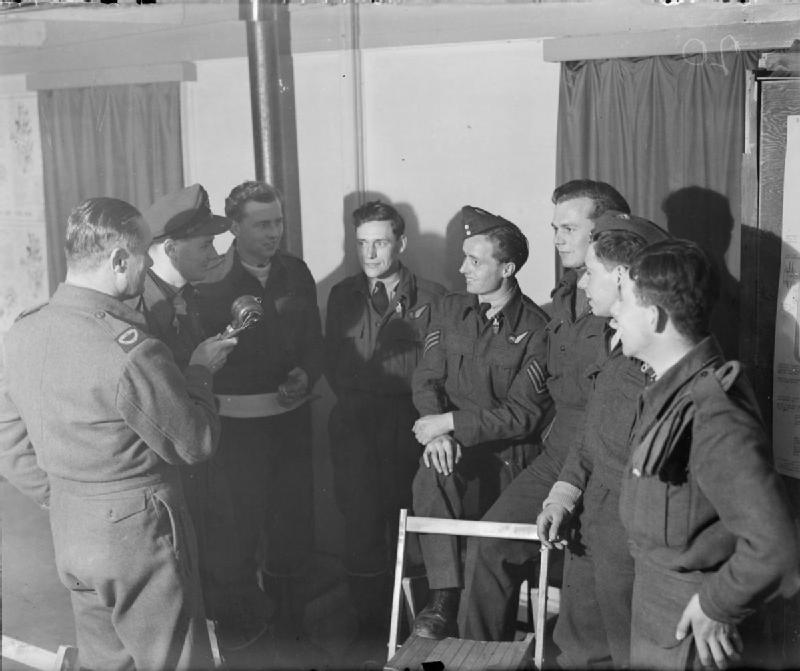
Crew of Avro Lancaster "S for Sugar" of 630 Squadron on their return to RAF East Kirkby after bombing the marshalling yards at Juvisy-sur-Orge, France

The squadron was formed at RAF East Kirkby, near Spilsby in Lincolnshire on 15 November 1943 from 'B' Flight of No. 57 Squadron RAF, equipped with Lancaster Mk.I bombers as part of No. 5 Group RAF in Bomber Command. It re-equipped with Lancaster Mk.III bombers the same month, carrying out strategic bombing roles. Between 18/19 November 1943 and 25 April 1945, the squadron took part in many major raids, including each of the 16 big raids made by Bomber Command on the German capital during what became known as the "Battle of Berlin".

== Operational service ==
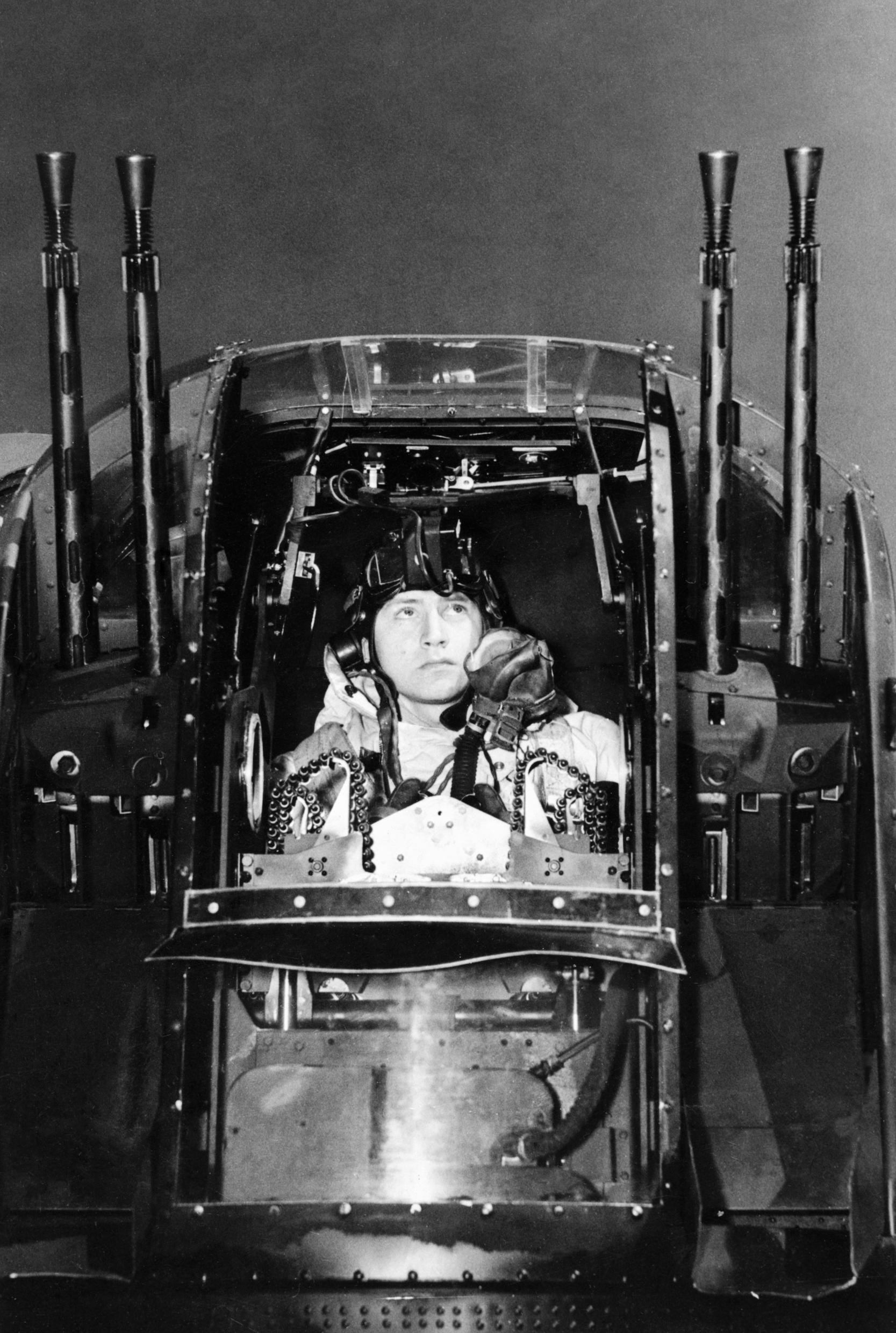
Flight sergeant J Morgan, the rear gunner of an Avro Lancaster of No. 630 Squadron at RAF East Kirkby, checks his guns before taking off on a night raid on the marshalling yards at Juvisy-sur-Orge, France

The units first operation was the night of 18/19 November 1943 when 9 of its Lancasters bombed Berlin and its last bombing sortie was 25 April 1945 with 5 Lancasters bombing Obersalzberg. Its last military operation was minelaying in Onions area (Oslofjord off Horten) on 25/26 April 1945.

Following April 1945 the squadron became involved in Operation Exodus: ferrying POWs back to Britain, finally disbanding on 18 July 1945.

== Aircraft operated ==
Aircraft operated by no. 630 Squadron RAF, data from
From	To	Aircraft	Version
November 1943	July 1945	Avro Lancaster	Mks.I & III

== See also ==
- List of Royal Air Force aircraft squadrons
