= East Kirkby =

Village and civil parish in the East Lindsey district of Lincolnshire, England

Coordinates: 53.142158°N 0.003037°W

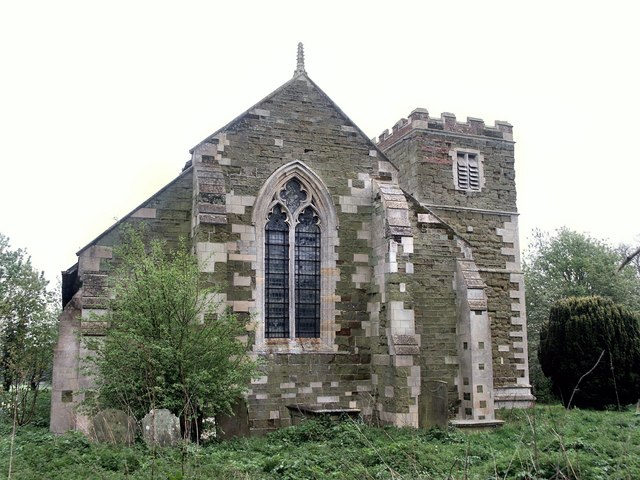
- Church of St Nicholas, East Kirkby

- Location within Lincolnshire
- Population: 303 (Including Hagnaby. 2011)
- OS grid reference: TF336624
  - London: 110 mi (180 km) S
- District: East Lindsey
- Shire county: Lincolnshire
- Region: East Midlands
- Country: England
- Sovereign state: United Kingdom
- Post town: Spilsby
- Postcode district: PE23
- Police: Lincolnshire
- Fire: Lincolnshire
- Ambulance: East Midlands
- UK Parliament: Louth and Horncastle

East Kirkby is a village and civil parish in the East Lindsey district of Lincolnshire, England. It is situated 7 miles (11 km) south-east from Horncastle, and on the A155 road.

East Kirkby 13th century Grade II* listed Anglican parish church is dedicated to St Nicholas. The church tower and nave arcades are of Decorated style, and the chancel screen, Perpendicular. In the south aisle is a 14th-century slab to Sir Robert Sylkestone (d. 1347), founder of the chantry.

A Wesleyan chapel was established in 1862.

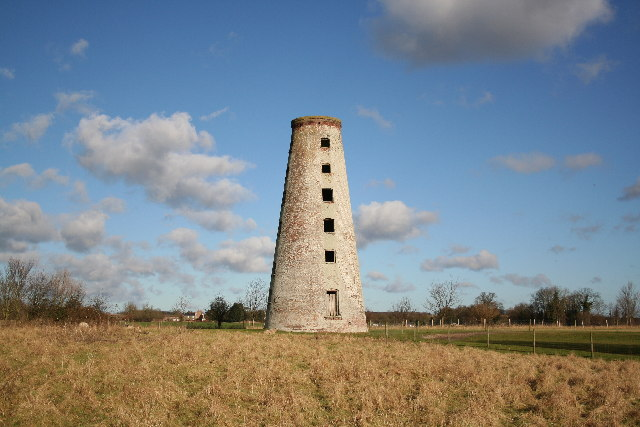
East Kirkby Mill

East Kirkby was the birthplace of Thomas Goodrich, or Goodricke, (1494–1554). Goodrich was Bishop of Ely (1533–54) and Lord High Chancellor of England from 1551.

East Kirkby has a disused 1820 Grade II listed tower mill. The village's public house is the Red Lion on Fen Lane.

The Prime Meridian passes just to the east of East Kirkby through the former RAF East Kirkby airfield, which has a meridian marker. The airfield was a Second World War Royal Air Force station, part of which now houses the Lincolnshire Aviation Heritage Centre.
