= RAF Ouston =

Former Royal Air Force station in Northumberland, England

RAF Ouston
- Near Ouston, Northumberland in England
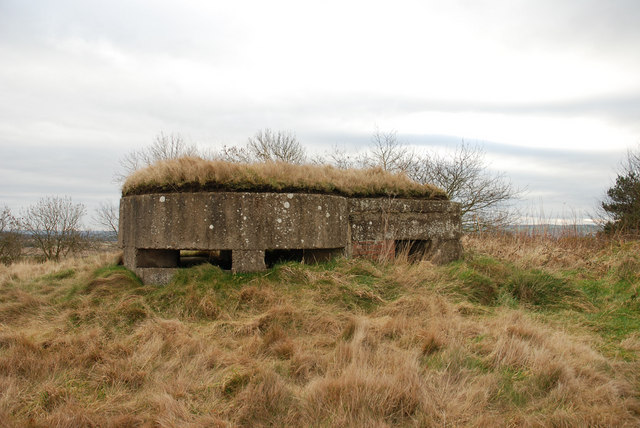
- A Second World War pillbox at former RAF Ouston

Site information
- Type: Royal Air Force station
- Code: OS
- Owner: Air Ministry (1940–1964); Ministry of Defence (1964–1974)
- Operator: Royal Air Force
- Controlled by: RAF Fighter Command * No. 9 Group RAF * No. 12 Group RAF * No. 13 Group RAF
- Condition: Closed

Location
- Shown within Northumberland RAF Ouston (the United Kingdom)
- Coordinates: 55°01′29″N 01°52′21″W

Site history
- Built: 1940–1941
- In use: March 1941–1974
- Fate: Transferred to the British Army to become Albemarle Barracks.
- Battles/wars: European theatre of World War II

Airfield information
- Elevation: 450 feet (137 m) AMSL
Runways
Direction	Length and surface
04/22	5,970 feet (1,820 m) Concrete
08/26	3,770 feet (1,150 m) Concrete
14/32	4,300 feet (1,300 m) Concrete

Royal Air Force Ouston or more simply RAF Ouston is a former Royal Air Force station that was located near the village of Stamfordham and the village of Heddon-on-the-Wall on Hadrian's Wall near Newcastle upon Tyne. It was built as a Second World War aerodrome and is today used by the British Army as Albemarle Barracks. Just north of the airfield is Richmond Hill in the parish of Stamfordham.

== History ==
In late 1938, the Air Ministry instructed a group of officials to go to Ouston to evaluate the possibility of building an airfield there. Unfortunately, the signal sent out by the ministry wasn't specific enough and some of the officials went to the one located a few miles southwest of Hexham. However, the intent at the time was for an airfield at the Ouston 12 mi (19 km) west of Newcastle and north of the Stanegate Roman road to Carlisle, Cumbria.

Construction work was slow to begin with because the area was quite remote from communication lines and there was some opposition from the local farming community, despite the land being of quite low quality. The station was built to a fairly standard design, having a mixture of prewar-style buildings and the utility types which came later. A "J"-type hangar dominated the airfield, with the control tower situated in front of it.

The station opened on 10 March 1941 as a Fighter Sector HQ under No. 13 Group RAF (13 Gp) to replace RAF Usworth, with its staff mainly being drawn from that station. The station's badge was a lion rampant in front of a Roman helmet. This was influenced by the nearby Hadrian's Wall and the lion is taken from the Percy family arms (the Percys being local landowners). The station motto underneath the badge was 'Persist'.

The first squadron at the station was No. 317 Polish Fighter Squadron, which had been transferred over from RAF Acklington at the end of April 1941. Equipped with Hawker Hurricanes, the recently formed Polish unit claimed its first kill on 2 June when a Junkers Ju 88 was sent into the North Sea. Relieved by No. 122 Squadron RAF (122 Sqn) from RAF Turnhouse on 26 June 1941; 317 Sqn then went south to RAF Colerne.

In July 1941, No. 232 Squadron RAF arrived with Hurricanes and then No. 122 Sqn transferred to RAF Catterick in August 1941, leaving No. 232 Squadron which eventually left for the Middle East in November. No. 131 Squadron RAF (131 Sqn), reformed at Ouston on 20 June 1941 with a large proportion of Belgian pilots but soon moved to Catterick too.

Another squadron that didn't register any kills whilst at Ouston was No. 81 Squadron RAF, which had moved in from RAF Turnhouse by early 1942. Its Spitfires returned to RAF Turnhouse five weeks later, although a further month was spent at Ouston during the early Summer of the same year.

Throughout 1941, the station had also served as a satellite landing ground for No. 55 Operational Training Unit RAF Hurricanes from RAF Usworth until No. 55 OTU moved to RAF Annan at the end of April 1942.

The Spitfires of No. 242 Squadron RAF were at Ouston for two weeks in May and June 1942. They were replaced by the reformed No. 243 Squadron RAF on 1 June. No. 243 Sqn became operational within a fortnight and flew coastal patrols and scrambles in defence of the North East until moving to RAF Turnhouse at the beginning of September. No. 72 Squadron RAF (72 Sqn) were at RAF Ouston briefly in the autumn of 1942 to re-equip before an overseas posting.

To cover Air-Sea Rescue off the East coast, No. 281 Squadron RAF (281 Sqn) had been formed at Ouston on 29 March 1942, equipped initially with Boulton Paul Defiants. In February 1943, Supermarine Walrus amphibians were added and by June, when the squadron moved to RAF Woolsington, the Defiants replaced by Avro Ansons.

Also in 1942, a flight from No. 410 Squadron RCAF (410 Sqn) was detached to Ouston for night-fighter patrol using Boulton-Paul Defiants initially, re-equipping with Bristol Beaufighters, despite some reluctance on the part of the crews.

No. 613 Squadron RAF, an Army Co-operation (AC) squadron, arrived in August 1942 flying North American Mustang Is, and exercised with local army units before departing at the beginning of March 1943. It was joined for a while in August by Douglas Bostons of No. 226 Squadron RAF, who were unfortunate enough to suffer three aircraft lost through crashes on their first day at Ouston. Other unusual lodgers were the Hurricanes of 804 Naval Air Squadron from RAF Machrihanish who arrived in early June 1943 and left for RNAS Twatt on 4 February the following year.

Austers appeared on 31 January 1943 when No. 657 Squadron RAF formed at Ouston, flying many Army exercises at Otterburn until leaving for North Africa in August. No. 198 Squadron RAF (198 Sqn) flew its Hawker Typhoons in from RAF Digby late in January 1943, but transferred to RAF Acklington soon after to complete its familiarization on the new type.

The last operational squadron to be based at RAF Ouston was No. 350 (Belgian) Squadron RAF. They spent most of June and July 1943 flying coastal and convoy patrols before returning to Acklington. On 21 June 1943, No. 62 Operational Training Unit began to move in from RAF Usworth, which had been found increasingly unsuitable for its work. The unit continued to train radar operators for the night-fighter force until disbanding on 6 June 1945. Ansons were used at first, but in the final months Vickers Wellingtons began to replace them.

No. 80 Operational Training Unit RAF which specialized in the training of French pilots on Spitfires, came to RAF Ouston from RAF Morpeth in July 1945 and flew from here prior to disbanding in March 1946. The North American Harvards of No. 22 Service Flying Training School RAF were displaced from RAF Calveley in Cheshire to Ouston in May 1946, before moving on to RAF Syerston in February 1948.

Under the aegis of the Royal Auxiliary Air Force, No. 607 Squadron RAF reformed with Spitfires on 10 May 1946, converted to de Havilland Vampires in 1951 and operated them up to March 1957 when it disbanded. No. 1965 Flight RAF embedded within No. 664 Squadron RAF, was also based at Ouston from 1 September 1949 until 14 February 1954 with Auster AOP.6s.

Continuing in its reserve role, the station housed Northumbrian Universities Air Squadron, No. 11 Air Experience Flight RAF (11 AEF), No. 641 Gliding School RAF (641 GS), and was employed as an RLG by the BAC Jet Provosts of No. 6 Flying Training School RAF (6 FTS) from Acklington. In 1967 Ouston became the North East Regional Airport for five months while Newcastle Airport's runway was being lengthened and renovated.

Up to the mid-1960s the servicing of Percival Provosts and BAC Jet Provosts of No. 6 Flying Training School RAF (6 FTS), was carried out by a civilian firm at Ouston under contract to the RAF.

HQ No. 13 Group RAF was located at Ouston until 1961, when it was disbanded by being redesignated No. 11 Group RAF.

== Cold war ==
As part of the nuclear deterrent, Ouston had its 04/22 main runway extended to 6,000 ft (1,800 m) and Operational Readiness Platforms added at each end of the extended runway, for use by aircraft dispersed from their parent stations.

== Units ==
The following units were here at some point:

- No. 3 Radio Servicing Section RAF
- No. 7 Anti-Aircraft Co-operation Unit RAF
- No. 13 Group Anti-Aircraft Co-operation Flight RAF
- No. 13 Group Communication Flight RAF (??-1961) became No. 11 Group Communication Flight RAF (1961-??)
- No. 27 Gliding School RAF (??-1955)
- No. 55 Operational Training Unit RAF
- No. 62 Operational Training Unit RAF (??-1945)
- No. 80 (French) Operational Training Unit RAF (??-1946)
- No. 607 Squadron RAF
- No. 1423 (Fighter) Flight RAF (??-1943)
- No. 1490 (Fighter Gunnery) Flight RAF
- No. 1508 (GEE Training) Flight RAF (??-1944)
- Durham University Air Squadron (??-1963) became Northumbrian Universities Air Squadron (1963-??)

== Motorsport ==
Ouston
- Location: Northumberland, England
- Opened: 1962
- Length: 1.5 mi (2.4 km)

There is a possibility that racing first took place at Ouston as early as 1961, but it is certain that the Newcastle & District Motor Club organised a race meetings there on 24 June 1962, 23 June 1963 and 21 June 1964, the last named being a joint car and motorcycle event. Jackie Stewart was a competitor at the 1963 meeting driving a Jaguar E-Type; he won the race and this is believed to have been his first victory.

Jim Clark attended the meeting in 1964 and was driven round the circuit in an open-topped Jaguar E-Type and then presented the prizes. It is possible that this may have been the last car meeting at Ouston as Croft Circuit in North Yorkshire had reopened in 1964.

In 1965, Motor Cycle magazine commented, when reporting on a motorcycle race meeting organised by the Newcastle Club held on Sunday 20 June, that there were 20,000 spectators present.

== Current use ==
RAF Ouston is now Albemarle Barracks.

== See also ==
- List of former Royal Air Force stations
