= James Bazin =

British flying ace of WWII

- Born: 2 December 1913; Kashmir, India
- Died: 9 January 1985 (aged 71); United Kingdom
- Military career
- Allegiance: United Kingdom
- Branch: Royal Air Force
- Service years: 1939–1945; 1946–1951
- Rank: Wing Commander
- Commands: No. 9 Squadron (1944–1945); No. 607 Squadron (1949–1951)
- Conflicts: Second World War: Battle of France; Battle of Britain; Operation Paravane; Operation Obviate
- Awards: Distinguished Service Order; Distinguished Flying Cross; Mention in Despatches

James Bazin, DSO, DFC (2 December 1913 – 9 January 1985) was a British flying ace who served with the Royal Air Force (RAF) during the Second World War. He was credited with having shot down ten aircraft and was also involved in Bomber Command's campaign to sink the battleship Tirpitz.

Born in India but raised in England, Bazin was called up for service in the RAF on the outbreak of the Second World War. He served with No. 607 Squadron during the Battle of France and in the subsequent Battle of Britain, destroying several aircraft during this time and awarded the Distinguished Flying Cross. For most of the period from 1941 to 1943, he carried out fighter controller duties but then transferred to Bomber Command. After a period of training on the Avro Lancaster heavy bomber, he was briefly posted to No. 49 Squadron before, in June 1944, being appointed to command of No. 9 Squadron. In September and October, he flew sorties to Norway to bomb the Tirpitz but his aircraft developed a fault on the squadron's last sortie to attack the ship on 12 November and did not contribute to its sinking that day. Awarded the Distinguished Service Order after the end of the war, he returned to civilian life but also served from 1946 to 1951 in the Royal Auxiliary Air Force, latterly as the commander of his former unit, No. 607 Squadron. He died in early 1985 at the age of 71.

== Early life ==
James Michael Bazin was born in the Kashmir region of India, on 2 December 1913, but his childhood was spent at Newcastle-upon-Tyne in the United Kingdom. Once his education was completed, he worked as an engineer. He enlisted in the Auxiliary Air Force in 1935 as a pilot with No. 607 Squadron, being commissioned as a pilot officer that December. Based at Usworth, the squadron flew Westland Wapitis light bombers but the following year it took up Hawker Demons, switching to a fighter role. In June 1937, Bazin was promoted to flying officer.

== Second World War ==
Mobilised for service in the Royal Air Force (RAF) on the outbreak of the Second World War in August 1939, No. 607 Squadron shortly relocated to Acklington with its Gloster Gladiator fighters, which it had commenced operating the previous December. It was tasked with patrol duties along the coastline and on 17 October Bazin was involved of the squadron's earliest engagements with the Luftwaffe. His section sighted and fired on four seaplanes although without success.

=== Battle of France ===
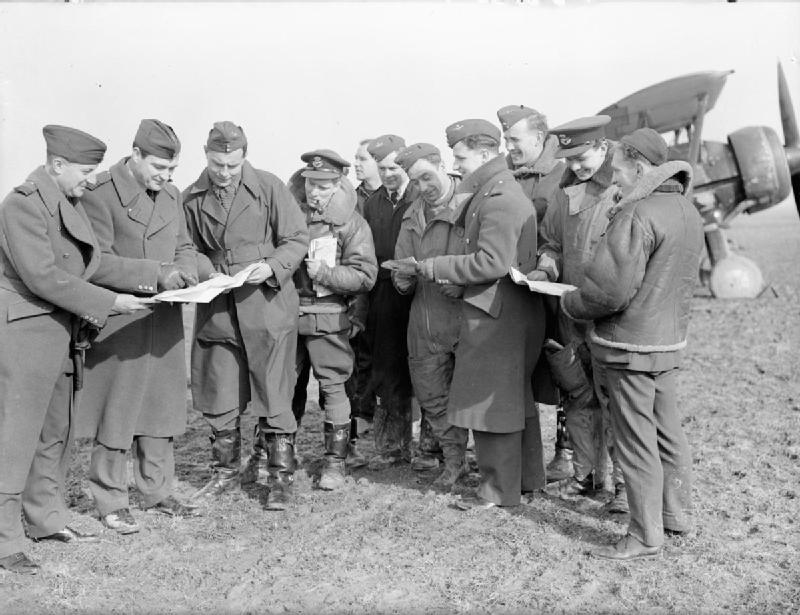
Pilots of No. 607 Squadron in France, 1940

In November No. 607 Squadron deployed to France as part of the Air Component of the British Expeditionary Force (BEF), designated as part of No. 60 Mobile Wing. It was rarely active against the Luftwaffe and in March 1940, the squadron began converting to the Hawker Hurricane fighter, a process which took until May to complete.

On 10 May, the opening day of the invasion of France, Bazin, flying a Hurricane, destroyed a Heinkel He 111 medium bomber to the north of Douai. The next day he destroyed another He 111 this time to the southeast of Brussels. He claimed further aerial victories during the course of the remainder of the squadron's service in France although the details of these are not known as its records were lost or destroyed during the retreat to the coast. He himself was also shot down on one occasion. After a frantic period of operations and having lost many of its aircraft due to bombings, No. 607 Squadron personnel left Boulogne on 21 May for England.

=== Battle of Britain ===
No. 607 Squadron duly reassembled at Croydon before moving north to Usworth to rest and refit. By August it was operational but aside from a scramble on 15 August to intercept He 111s heading to Newcastle and Tyneside, it was engaged mostly in convoy patrols and escorts. At the start of September, it was sent south to Tangmere to reinforce No. 11 Group and became operational in its sector on 8 September. By this time Bazin held the rank of flight lieutenant. On 15 September, now known as Battle of Britain Day, he destroyed one Dornier Do 17 medium bomber and damaged a second, both near Tenterden. He shot down a Junkers Ju 88 medium bomber on September 30, and was also credited with the probable destruction of a second Ju 88 the same day.

On 5 October an engine failure on his Hurricane resulted in him making a forced landing at Hurn. Later in the month, and in recognition of his successes, Bazin was awarded the Distinguished Flying Cross (DFC); the citation, published in The London Gazette, read:

This officer has shot down some ten enemy aircraft. He himself was shot down on one occasion, over enemy territory, but with amazing initiative and determination rejoined his unit within 24 hours. In August, 1940, he destroyed two enemy aircraft in raids on the North-East coast, and in September, 1940, he led two squadrons in a head-on attack against 100 to 120 enemy aircraft. The enemy were completely nonplussed and fled. As a leader Flight Lieutenant Bazin has shown marked ability and initiative.

— London Gazette, No. 34978, 25 October 1940

Later in October, No. 607 Squadron relocated to Turnhouse in Scotland, where it took on new pilots to replace those lost in previous weeks. Bazin was posted away from No. 607 Squadron in early January 1941, and subsequently took up a post as a controller with No. 14 Group, based at its operations room in Inverness. At the end of the year he was promoted to temporary squadron leader. He was mentioned in despatches on 1 January 1943.

After undergoing refresher flying training, at the start of 1944 Bazin was posted to Bomber Command. He trained at No. 16 Operational Training Unit and, after a conversion course on the Avro Lancaster heavy bomber, in May was posted to No. 49 Squadron at Fiskerton. In June, he was given command of No. 9 Squadron. This was based at Bardney and operating Lancasters on strategic bombing duties in support of the invasion of France.

=== Attacks on Tirpitz ===
Two months later, No. 9 Squadron was selected for Bomber Command's campaign to sink the German battleship Tirpitz. On 11 September the squadron, along with Lancasters from No. 617 Squadron, flew to Yagodnik, in the Soviet Union, for the first attack, code named Operation Paravane, on the Tirpitz. From there would launch their sortie on the ship, anchored at Kåfjord in Norway. After a delay due to poor weather, the operation commenced on the morning of 15 September; arriving at Kåfjord, Bazin piloted the seventh bomber to make a run on the battleship. Cloud obscured the target so he made a second run but a smoke screen prevented accurate placement of his bombs when released. The Lancasters returned to Yagodnik and subsequent reconnaissance confirmed that the Tirpitz remained afloat. The next day both squadrons flew back to their bases in the United Kingdom.

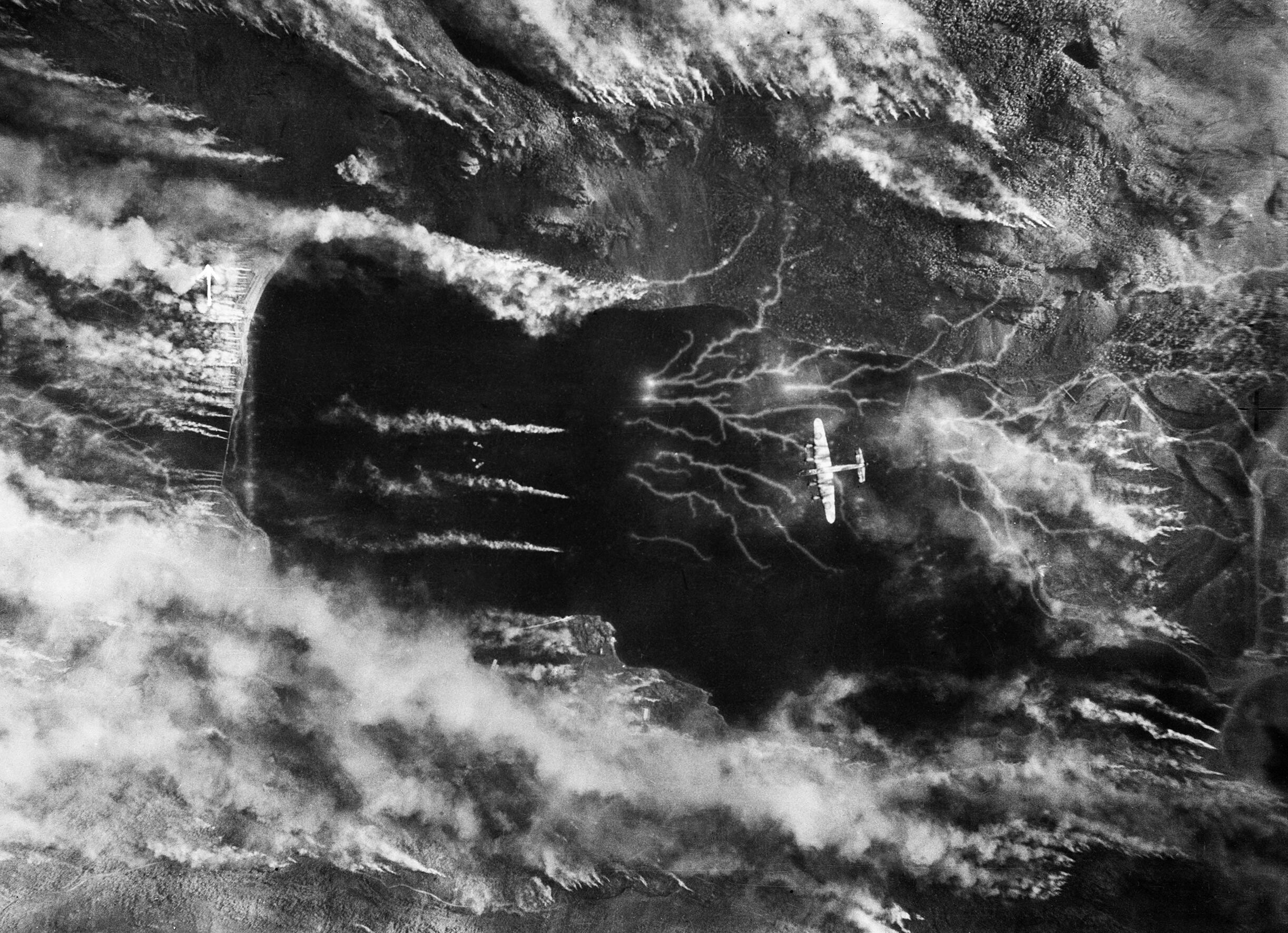
An Avro Lancaster over Kåfjord during Operation Paravane, 15 September 1944

Nos. 9 and 617 Squadrons made another attack on Tirpitz, now berthed at Tromsø, in October. This time, the sortie, code named Operation Obviate, commenced from bases in northern Scotland. The Lancasters involved had undergone modifications to increase their range, being made lighter and with extra fuel tanks. The attack was made on 28 October but cloud cover prevent accurate bombing. The ship was damaged with some flooding of compartments but was still floating. A further attempt, also mounted from northern Scotland, was made on 12 November but Bazin's aircraft was one of two that were insufficiently de-iced and unable to takeoff. The remaining bombers successfully bombed the Tirpitz, which keeled over and sank.

In May 1945, having flown 25 sorties with No. 9 Squadron, Bazin was released from the RAF as an acting wing commander. He was subsequently awarded the Distinguished Service Order in September in recognition of his wartime services. He was credited with the destruction of ten aircraft although the details of six of these are not known. He damaged one aircraft and probably destroyed another.

== Later life ==
With his RAF service at an end, Bazin resumed his prewar profession as an engineer. However in June 1946, No. 607 Squadron, which had been disbanded at the end of the war, reformed as part of the Royal Auxiliary Air Force and Bazin became a member of its complement as a flight lieutenant. It operated Spitfires from a base at Ouston as its previous airfield had become Sunderland's airport. In October 1949, Bazin was promoted to squadron leader and took command of the squadron. His tenure as commander of No. 607 Squadron ended in March 1951, and he transferred to the Reserve.

Bazin died on 9 January 1985. Cremated, his ashes were scattered at Tangmere cemetery. His son and daughter-in-law published a biography of Bazin, titled From the Battle of Britain to Bombing Hitler's Berchtesgaden, in 2023.
