= No. 81 Group RAF =

Former Royal Air Force operations group

No. 81 (Training) Group No. 81 (OTU) Group RAF
- Royal Air Force Ensign
- Active: 16 December 1940 – 15 April 1943; 1 January 1952 – 31 March 1958
- Country: United Kingdom
- Branch: Royal Air Force
- Type: Royal Air Force group
- Role: Fighter Command Operational Training Units and Operational Conversion Units
- Part of: RAF Fighter Command
- Mottos: Latin: Fulmina Ex Igne Politiora ("Lightning is cleaner than fire")

Commanders
- Notable commanders: Air Commodore Colin Campbell McMullen CBE, AFC

No. 81 Group (81 Gp) was a group within the Royal Air Force's Fighter Command during the Second World War and the post-war era, which disbanded at the end of March 1958. It was initially formed during December 1940, lasting almost two and a half years before disbanding in April 1943. It reformed at the start of 1952.

== History ==
No. 81 Group was formed on 16 December 1940 at RAF Sealand, as part of Fighter Command, to control the Operational Training Units. On 19 February 1941 the group headquarters moved to Tallow Hall in Worcester, and then on 22 December 1941 it was based at Avening Court in Gloucestershire. It was disbanded on 15 April 1943 when all controlled units were moved to No. 9 Group.

The group was reformed on 1 January 1952 at RAF Watnall, in Nottinghamshire to control all training units within Fighter Command. On 16 May 1952 it moved to RAF Rudloe Manor, in Wiltshire. On 1 November 1954 the Central Flying School was transferred to No. 81 Group. It was finally disbanded on 31 March 1958.

== Organisation ==
=== 1 January 1941 ===
The group was organised as follows;

- Group Headquarters at Antumn Avenue, Worcester
  - No. 54 Operational Training Unit RAF at RAF Church Fenton with Bristol Blenheims & Bristol Beaufighters
  - No. 55 Operational Training Unit RAF at RAF Aston Down with Supermarine Spitfires, Hawker Hurricanes & Bristol Blenheims
  - No. 56 Operational Training Unit RAF at RAF Sutton Bridge with Hawker Hurricanes
  - No. 57 Operational Training Unit RAF at RAF Hawarden with Supermarine Spitfires
  - No. 58 Operational Training Unit RAF at RAF Grangemouth with Supermarine Spitfires

=== 1 May 1942 ===
The group was organised as follows;

- Group Headquarters, RAF Avening Court, Stroud, Gloucestershire
  - No. 51 Operational Training Unit RAF at RAF Cranfield with Bristol Blenheims & Bristol Beaufighters
  - No. 52 Operational Training Unit RAF at RAF Aston Down with Supermarine Spitfires
  - No. 53 Operational Training Unit RAF at RAF Llandow and RAF Rhoose with Supermarine Spitfires
  - No. 54 Operational Training Unit RAF at RAF Charterhall and RAF Winfield with Bristol Blenheims & Bristol Beaufighters
  - No. 55 Operational Training Unit RAF at RAF Annan and RAF Longtown with Hawker Hurricanes
  - No. 56 Operational Training Unit RAF at RAF Tealing and RAF Kinnell with Hawker Hurricanes
  - No. 57 Operational Training Unit RAF at RAF Hawarden with Supermarine Spitfires
  - No. 58 Operational Training Unit RAF at RAF Grangemouth and RAF Balado Bridge with Supermarine Spitfires
  - No. 59 Operational Training Unit RAF at RAF Crosby on Eden and RAF Longtown with Hawker Hurricanes
  - No. 60 Operational Training Unit RAF at RAF East Fortune and RAF Macmerry with Bristol Blenheims & Bristol Beaufighters
  - No. 61 Operational Training Unit RAF at RAF Rednal and RAF Montford Bridge with Supermarine Spitfires

=== 1 March 1943 ===
The group was organised as follows;

- Group Headquarters, RAF Avening Court, Stroud, Gloucestershire
  - No. 41 Operational Training Unit RAF at RAF Hawarden and RAF Poulton with North American Mustangs & Hawker Hurricanes
  - No. 51 Operational Training Unit RAF at RAF Cranfield and RAF Twinwood Farm with Bristol Blenheims & Bristol Beaufighters
  - No. 52 Operational Training Unit RAF at RAF Aston Down with Supermarine Spitfires
  - No. 53 Operational Training Unit RAF at RAF Llandow and RAF Rhoose with Supermarine Spitfires
  - No. 54 Operational Training Unit RAF at RAF Charterhall and RAF Winfield with Bristol Blenheims & Bristol Beaufighters
  - No. 55 Operational Training Unit RAF at RAF Annan and RAF Longtown with Hawker Hurricanes
  - No. 56 Operational Training Unit RAF at RAF Tealing and RAF Kinnell with Hawker Hurricanes and Supermarine Spitfires
  - No. 57 Operational Training Unit RAF at RAF Eshott and RAF Boulmer with Supermarine Spitfire fighters
  - No. 58 Operational Training Unit RAF at RAF Grangemouth and RAF Balado Bridge with Supermarine Spitfires
  - No. 59 Operational Training Unit RAF at RAF Milfield, RAF Brunton and RAF Boulmer with Hawker Hurricanes
  - No. 61 Operational Training Unit RAF at RAF Rednal and RAF Montford Bridge with Supermarine Spitfires
  - No. 62 Operational Training Unit RAF at RAF Usworth with Avro Ansons

=== 1 April 1953 ===
The group was organised as follows;

- Group Headquarters, RAF Pembrey, Wales
  - No. 229 Operational Conversion Unit RAF at RAF Chivenor with de Havilland Vampires
  - No. 238 Operational Conversion Unit RAF at RAF Colerne with de Havilland Vampires
  - No. 228 Operational Conversion Unit RAF at RAF Leeming with Gloster Meteors
  - No. 233 Operational Conversion Unit RAF at RAF Middle Wallop with de Havilland Vampires
  - No. 1906 Air Observation Post Flight RAF at RAF Middle Wallop with Sikorsky Hoverflys
  - School of Control and Reporting RAF at RAF Middle Wallop with Supermarine Spitfires
  - No. 226 Operational Conversion Unit RAF at RAF Stradishall with Gloster Meteors

== Air Officers Commanding ==
=== 1940 to 1943 ===
- 16 December 1940 – Air Commodore F J Vincent
- 29 July 1942 – Air Commodore W H Dunn

=== 1952 to 1958 ===
- 1 January 1952 – Air Commodore L W C Bower
- January 1954 – Air Commodore C C McMullen
- 19 February 1954 – Vacant
- 2 April 1954 – Air Commodore H A V Hogan
- 15 August 1955 – Air Commodore R C Mead
