= RAF Longtown =

Former RAF airfield in Cumbria, England

RAF Longtown
- Near Longtown, Cumbria in England

Site information
- Type: Royal Air Force satellite station
- Code: IO
- Owner: Air Ministry
- Operator: Royal Air Force
- Controlled by: RAF Fighter Command 1941-43 * No. 9 Group RAF * No. 13 Group RAF * No. 81 (OTU) Group RAF; RAF Coastal Command 1943- * No. 17 Group RAF

Location
- Shown within Cumbria RAF Longtown (the United Kingdom)
- Coordinates: 55°00′21″N 002°55′15″W

Site history
- Built: 1941
- In use: July 1941 - April 1946

Airfield information
- Elevation: 30 metres (98 ft) AMSL
Runways
| Direction | Length and surface |
|---|---|
| 00/00 | 2,000 yards (1,829 m) Concrete |
| 00/00 | 1,380 yards (1,262 m) Concrete |
| 00/00 | 1,150 yards (1,052 m) Concrete |

Royal Air Force Longtown or more simply RAF Longtown is a former Royal Air Force satellite station located 2 miles (3.2 km) east of Longtown, Cumbria and 7.7 miles (12.4 km) northeast of Carlisle, Cumbria, England.

== History ==
The following units were posted here at some point:

- No. 1 (Coastal) Engine Control Demonstration Unit RAF
- No. 6 (Coastal) Operational Training Unit RAF
- No. 9 (Coastal) Operational Training Unit RAF
- No. 41 Squadron RAF between 1 August and 11 August 1942 with Supermarine Spitfire VB's
- No. 55 Operational Training Unit RAF
- No. 59 Operational Training Unit RAF
- No. 1332 (Transport) Heavy Conversion Unit RAF
- No. 1521 (Radio Aids Training) Flight RAF
- No. 1674 Heavy Conversion Unit RAF

== Current use ==
The site is currently farmland.
