= Balado, Kinross =

Village in Perth and Kinross, Scotland

Coordinates: 56.206°N 3.462°W

Balado, from Scottish Gaelic: Am Baile Àthach is a hamlet in Kinross-shire in the council area of Perth and Kinross.

T in the Park was forced to relocate in 2011.

It includes RAF Balado Bridge.
