= RAF Grangemouth =

Former Royal Air Force station in Stirlingshire, Scotland

RAF Grangemouth
- Grangemouth, Stirlingshire in Scotland

Site information
- Type: Royal Air Force station Parent Station
- Code: GW
- Owner: Air Ministry
- Operator: Royal Air Force
- Controlled by: RAF Fighter Command * No. 9 Group RAF * No. 13 Group RAF * No. 14 Group RAF * No. 81 (OTU) Group RAF

Location
- Shown within Falkirk RAF Grangemouth (the United Kingdom)
- Coordinates: 56°01′11″N 003°41′30″W

Site history
- Built: 1938/39
- In use: May 1939 – 1945
- Battles/wars: European theatre of World War II

Airfield information
- Elevation: 4 metres (13 ft) AMSL
Runways
Direction	Length and surface
00/00	Tarmac
00/00	Tarmac

Royal Air Force Grangemouth or more simply RAF Grangemouth was a Royal Air Force station located 3 miles (4.8 km) north east of Falkirk, Stirlingshire, Scotland.

== History ==
It was opened as the Central Scotland Airport in May 1939 and operated as a Civilian Air Navigation School (CANS) until early September 1939. After the war it was used as Gliding School until 1946. It was then used by RAF Maintenance Command until its closure in June 1955.

=== Second World War ===
From September 1939 – March 1941 it was used by 602 Squadron flying Supermarine Spitfires, 141 Squadron flying Bristol Blenheims and Gloster Gladiators and 263 Squadron flying Westland Whirlwinds. In December 1940 it was used by No. 58 Operational Training Unit (later renamed No. 2 Tactical Exercise Unit RAF).

The air traffic control tower (watch tower) was of a pre-war civilian type. There were 10 Hangars, two were of a civil type and the other eight were of the Blister type.

In an attempt to reduce the number of crashes caused by over-shooting, the east–west runway was extended by about 300 yards in the summer of 1942. This runway intersected with the Inchyra Road runway and extended west to where Candie Crescent now starts off Overton Road. The Charlotte Dundas Shopping Centre was built over part of the remains of this runway in 1960–1961.

=== Post war ===
After the war, it was used as a gliding school and by No. 13 Refresher Flying School RAF, then by RAF Maintenance Command until closure in 1955.

Unfortunately at 0200 one Sunday in 1952 a fire started & some of the buildings were destroyed.

=== Timeline ===
- 01/05/1939: Opened as Central Scotland Airport.
- 01/05/1939 – 09/39: No. 35 E&RFTS with Hawker Harts and de Havilland Tiger Moths and No. 10 Civilian Air Navigation School with Avro Ansons.
- 09/39 – 03/41: Airfield used by 602 Sqn Spitfires, 141 Sqn Blenheims and Gladiators and 263 Sqn Hurricanes and 614 Sqn Lysanders.
- 12/40 – 06/44: No. 58 Operational Training Unit with Spitfires, from 1942 satellite airfield at RAF Balado Bridge.
- 10/43: No. 58 Operational Training Unit renamed No. 2 Tactical Exercise Unit.
- 1945-46: Used as a Gliding School.
- 1948-49: 13 Refresher Flying School with de Havilland Tiger Moths, then used by RAF Maintenance Command until closure.

=== Operational units and aircraft ===
Unit	From	To	Aircraft	Version	Notes
No. 35 Elementary and Reserve Flying Training School RAF	1 May 1939	3 Sep 1939	Hawker Hart de Havilland Tiger Moth	I II	
No. 10 Civil Air Navigation School RAF	Sep 1939	Oct 1939	Avro Anson	I	
No. 10 Air Observers Navigation School RAF	1 Nov 1939	2 Dec 1939	Avro Anson	I	
No. 602 Squadron RAF	7 Oct 1939	13 Oct 1939	Supermarine Spitfire	I	
No. 141 Squadron RAF	19 Oct 1939	28 June 1940	Bristol Blenheim; Gloster Gladiators	IF; I	
No. 263 Squadron RAF	28 June 1940	2 Sep 1940	Hawker Hurricane; Westland Whirlwind	I I	Detachment at RAF Montrose.
No. 614 Squadron RAF	8 Jun 1940	5 Mar 1941	Westland Lysander	II	

=== Other Units/Wings ===
No. 52 (Army Co-operation) Wing RAF

9 June 1940 – 14 July 1940.

No. 58 Operational Training Unit

No. 58 Operational Training Unit was planned to form at RAF Grangemouth in October 1940 within No. 10 Group to train night fighter crews. This was changed in early December when it actually formed as a day fighter pilot training unit, using Spitfires and Masters. It was transferred to No. 81 Group at the end of December 1940 and disbanded in early October 1943 when it was redesignated No. 2 Combat Training Wing (changed again to No. 2 Tactical Exercise Unit at a later date).

In the event of a German invasion the OTU would have become No. 558 Squadron (and later also as No. 563 Squadron) to operate from RAF Turnhouse.

The unit reformed on 15 March 1945, at RAF Poulton in No. 12 Group, as half an Operational Training Unit equipped with Spitfires from the day fighter element of No. 41 Operational Training Unit until it was disbanded on 20 July 1945.

Codes used: -

- PQ Dec 1940 – Oct 1943
- P9 Mar 1945 – Jul 1945

No. 4 Aircraft Delivery Flight RAF (April 1941 – January 1942)

Commanding Officer Squadron Leader Eric Valentine Hulbert appointed 16 April 1943.

No. 2 Combat Training Wing RAF (October 1943)

See No. 58 Operational Training Unit Above.

No. 2 Tactical Exercise Unit RAF (October 1943 – June 1944)

See No. 58 Operational Training Unit Above.

Sub site of No. 14 Maintenance Unit RAF (October 1944 – August 1949)

== Present day ==
Today the site is now part of Inchyra Park, a light industrial area, the Charlotte Dundas Shopping Centre, and a housing estate. The shorter runway is now Inchyra Road, Grangemouth. Contrary to many reports, the vast majority of the site is NOT now covered by petrochemicals industry. Only a relatively small area east of Inchyra Road has such industry on it and which was only built on during the 1970s and thereafter.

Some of the hangars still remain intact at Latitude, Longitude 56.013348N, 3.707562W.

In 2008, a memorial garden was unveiled, to commemorate those who died, planted on ground granted for the purpose and located on the perimeter of the original airfield. Within the garden, a wall features the names of 71 trainee pilots from 11 countries who died whilst in training. On Thursday 9 May 2013, a full size replica of a Mk1 Spitfire was unveiled in the memorial garden.

The memorial remembers the contribution of hundreds of Polish and other international pilots who developed their skills at the airfield as members of No. 58 Operational Training Unit during the Second World War.

== Wartime Deaths ==
The many British and Polish pilots dying of wounds on return are buried to the south in Grandsable Cemetery.
