= RAF Caistor =

Former Royal Air Force station in Lincolnshire, England

RAF Caistor
- Near Caistor, Lincolnshire in England
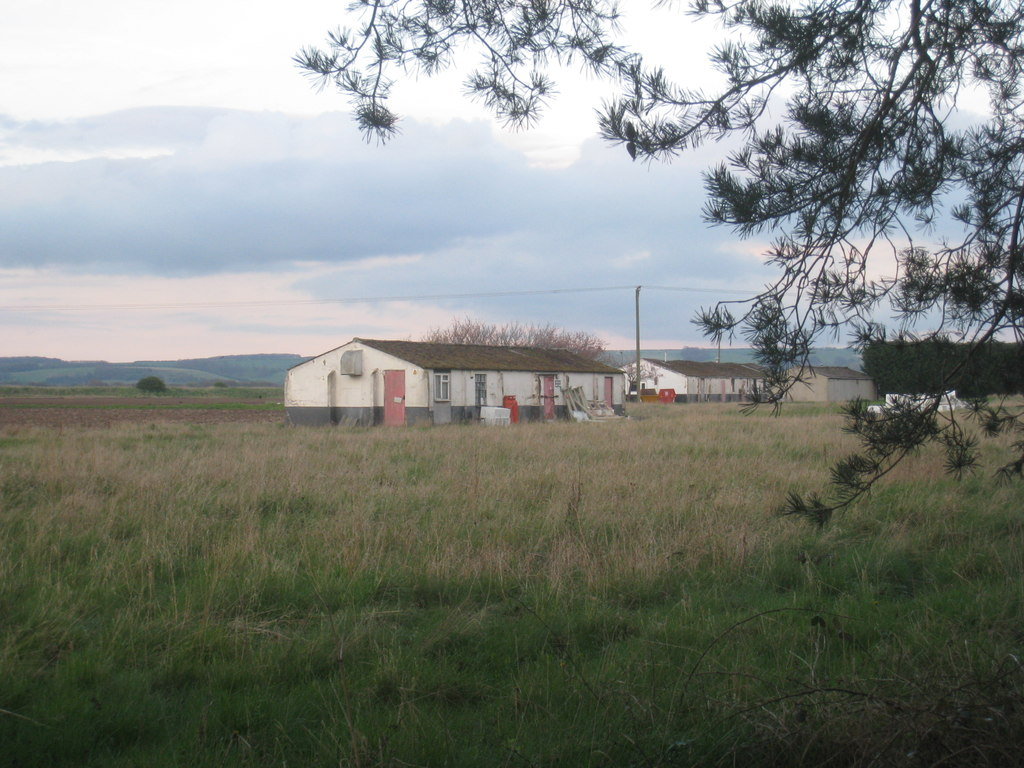

Site information
- Type: RAF relief landing ground
- Owner: Air Ministry
- Operator: Royal Air Force
- Controlled by: RAF Fighter Command * No. 9 Group RAF * No. 81 (OTU) Group RAF

Location
- Shown within Lincolnshire RAF Caistor (the United Kingdom)
- Coordinates: 53°30′10″N 000°21′50″W

Site history
- Built: 1941
- In use: 1941-1963
- Battles/wars: European theatre of World War II

Airfield information
- Elevation: 100 feet (30 m) AMSL
Runways
Direction	Length and surface
00/00	Grass
00/00	Grass
00/00	Grass
00/00	Grass

Royal Air Force Caistor or more simply RAF Caistor is a former Royal Air Force relief landing ground located 6 miles (10 km) south east of Brigg, Lincolnshire and 9 miles (14 km) north west of Binbrook, Lincolnshire, England, the site is now used for farming.

== History ==
=== Second World War ===
- Satellite of No. 1 Air Armament School RAF (December 1942 - June 1943)
- Relief Landing Ground for No. 15 (Pilots) Advanced Flying Unit RAF (June - September 1942)
- No. 53 Operational Training Unit RAF (1943-44)
- A detachment of No. 85 Squadron RAF
- Sub site for No. 93 Maintenance Unit RAF (December 1948 - December 1950)
- Sub site for No. 233 Maintenance Unit RAF (February 1945 - ?)
- Relief Landing Ground for RAF College SFTS (June 1943 - March 1944) became Relief Landing Ground for No. 17 Service Flying Training School RAF (March 1944 - February 1945)

=== Cold War ===
- No. 269 Squadron RAF with PGM-17 Thors

== Current use ==
The site has now returned to agricultural use, and little remains of the military facilities.
