= No. 9 Group RAF =

Formation of the British Royal air force 1918-1944

No. 9 (Fighter) Group RAF ~~No. 9 (Operations) Group RAF~~
- Royal Air Force Ensign
- Active: 1 April 1918 – 15 May 1919; 9 August 1940 – 17 September 1944
- Country: United Kingdom
- Branch: Royal Air Force
- Type: Royal Air Force group
- Role: Fighter cover for North West England and Northern Ireland
- Part of: RAF Fighter Command
- Garrison/HQ: RAF Barton Hall
- Engagements: World War II: European theatre of World War II; Battle of Britain

Commanders
- Notable commanders: Air Vice Marshal Wilfred McClaughry CB, DSO, MC, DFC

No. 9 Group RAF (9 Gp) was a group of the Royal Air Force, which existed for periods, at the end of the First World War, and during the Second World War when its role was air defence.

== History ==
The group was first formed on 1 April 1918 in No. 2 Area. The next month it was transferred to South-Western Area and then disbanded on 15 May 1919.

Its next incarnation was as part of RAF Fighter Command. In 1940, the need for another Group headquarters to control fighter operations became more and more apparent. No. 9 Group was formed in September 1940 to cover North West England and Northern Ireland. It was based at RAF Barton Hall and initially only controlled No. 308 Polish Fighter Squadron at RAF Speke.

On 1 January 1941 the group was equipped with the Hawker Hurricane Mk I fighter.

- No. 96 Squadron RAF at RAF Cranage
- No. 229 Squadron RAF at RAF Speke
- No. 306 Polish Fighter Squadron at RAF Tern Hill
- No. 308 Polish Fighter Squadron at RAF Baginton
- No. 312 (Czechoslovak) Squadron RAF at RAF Speke

No. 275 Squadron RAF was formed at RAF Valley on 15 October 1941 as 9 Group's Air Sea Rescue unit, to cover the Irish Sea. The Group supplied the staff that were trained by Robert Watson-Watt, the inventor of radar, to operate the Chain Home early warning system. The staff being RAF females (they were never WAAF members).

On 1 May 1942 the group contained:

- No. 131 Squadron RAF at RAF Llanbedr, Spitfires
- No. 232 Squadron RAF at RAF Atcham, Spitfires
- No. 255 Squadron RAF at RAF High Ercall, Beaufighters
- No. 257 Squadron RAF at RAF Honiley, Hurricanes and Spitfires
- No. 315 Polish Fighter Squadron at RAF Woodvale, Spitfires

On 1 March 1943 it consisted of:

- No. 41 Squadron RAF at RAF High Ercall, Spitfires
- No. 96 Squadron RAF at RAF Honiley, Beaufighters
- No. 195 Squadron RAF at RAF Woodvale, Typhoons
- No. 219 Squadron RAF at RAF Scorton, Beaufighters
- No. 256 Squadron RAF at RAF Woodvale, Beaufighters
- No. 456 Squadron RAAF at RAF Valley, Beaufighters and Mosquitos

No. 9 Group had a relatively short life. By 1944 it was predominantly a training formation.

On 6 June 1944 it comprised:

- two sector stations, RAF Honiley and RAF Woodvale,
- eight Operational Training Units:
  - No. 13 Operational Training Unit at RAF Bicester and RAF Finmere, Mosquitos and Bostons
  - No. 41 Operational Training Unit at RAF Hawarden and RAF Poulton, Mustangs and Hurricanes
  - No. 42 Operational Training Unit at RAF Ashbourne and RAF Darley Moor, Whitleys, Oxfords, Ansons and Albemarles
  - No. 51 Operational Training Unit at RAF Cranfield and RAF Twinwood Farm, Mosquitos
  - No. 53 Operational Training Unit RAF at RAF Kirton-in-Lindsey, RAF Hibaldstow and RAF Caistor, Spitfires
  - No. 54 Operational Training Unit at RAF Charterhall and RAF Winfield, Beaufighters
  - No. 57 Operational Training Unit at RAF Eshott and RAF Boulmer, Spitfires
  - No. 59 Operational Training Unit at RAF Boulmer, Hurricanes and Typhoons
  - No. 60 Operational Training Unit at RAF High Ercall, Mosquitos
  - No. 61 Operational Training Unit at RAF Rednal and RAF Montford Bridge, Spitfires
  - No. 62 Operational Training Unit at RAF Ouston, Ansons and Wellingtons
- three Tactical Exercise Units:
  - No. 1 Tactical Exercise Unit at RAF Kinnell, Hurricanes and Spitfires
  - No. 2 Tactical Exercise Unit at RAF Grangemouth and RAF Balado Bridge, Spitfires
  - No. 3 Tactical Exercise Unit at RAF Annan, Typhoons and Spitfires
- AI Conversion Unit
- Fighter Leaders School RAF
- No. 2 Aircraft Delivery Flight
- No. 58 Repair and Salvage Unit
- three other support/supply units
- 9 Group Communications Flight flying Hawker Hurricanes and Airspeed Oxfords from Samlesbury Aerodrome.

It was absorbed into 12 Group on 15 September 1944.

== Commanders ==
The following officers had command of No. 9 Group:

=== 1918 to 1919 ===
- 1 April 1918 Brigadier-General H. D. Briggs

=== 1940 to 1944 ===
- 16 September 1940 Air Vice-Marshal Wilfred McClaughry
- April 1942 Air Vice-Marshal Leonard Slatter
- 26 June 1942 Air Vice-Marshal William Dickson
- 1942 Air Commodore Charles Steele (Temporary appointment)
- 10 November 1942 Air Vice-Marshal John Whitworth-Jones
- 2 July 1943 Air Vice-Marshal Leslie Hollinghurst
- 6 November 1943 Air Commodore Cecil Stevens (Temporary appointment)
- 7 December 1943 Air Vice-Marshal Donald Stevenson

== See also ==
- List of Royal Air Force groups
