= RAF Rhoose =

Former Royal Air Force satellite station in Vale of Glamorgan, Wales (1942–1946)

RAF Rhoose
- Near Barry, Vale of Glamorgan in Wales

Site information
- Type: Satellite station
- Code: RH
- Owner: Air Ministry
- Operator: Royal Air Force
- Controlled by: RAF Fighter Command 1942 – 1944 * No. 81 (OTU) Group RAF; RAF Flying Training Command 1944; RAF Maintenance Command 1944; *No. 40 Group RAF

Location
- Shown within the Vale of Glamorgan RAF Rhoose (the United Kingdom)
- Coordinates: 51°23′48″N 003°20′36″W

Site history
- Built: 1941/42
- In use: April 1942 – 1946
- Battles/wars: European theatre of World War II

Garrison information
- Occupants: 1944; Officers – 26 (2 WAAF); Other Ranks – 624 (110 WAAF)

Airfield information
- Elevation: 280 feet (85 m) AMSL
Runways
Direction	Length and surface
03/21	1,550 yards (1,417 m) Asphalt concrete
12/30	1,100 yards (1,006 m) Asphalt concrete

Royal Air Force Rhoose, or more simply RAF Rhoose, is a former Royal Air Force satellite station located near Rhoose, 10 miles (16 km) south west of Cardiff and 2 miles (3 km) east of RAF St Athan, Vale of Glamorgan, Wales. It was first used by an Operational Training Unit in April 1942, as additional space, until May 1943. The airfield then remained unused until February 1944, when an Air Gunnery School operated out of RAF Rhoose until August 1944. It was then placed into care and maintenance until transferred to RAF Maintenance Command in November 1944. After the Second World War, the airfield became a sub-site of a Maintenance Unit. The MU and airfield closed in 1948.

The new airfield at Rhoose was urgently needed to relieve RAF Llandow. The latter opened as an Aircraft Storage Unit (A.S.U.) but was then allocated a training unit on top. There were a number of reasons, there was a need for space to accommodate operational squadrons in the south-east of England, and a need to move the training schools and trainee pilots away from any Luftwaffe incursions.

RAF Rhoose was used immediately upon opening, by the training unit, alleviating RAF Llandow. However, as there were little facilities available at the satellite, all aircraft maintenance had to be done at the parent base.

By the end of 1944 the airfield was utilised for aircraft storage, but with hangar space being limited, most of the aircraft were stored in the open, covered with tarpaulin, and the airfield continued in this role until the end of the Second World War. For a short period in 1946, Rhoose was used as a bomb storage depot. However, this was kept as a secret from the local community for fear of complaints and creating panic.

== History ==
=== Station design ===
Farmland, a couple of miles from the airfield at RAF St Athan, next to the village of Rhoose was requisitioned by the Air Ministry. The airfield was constructed as a satellite airfield to RAF Llandow, which was struggling to accommodate No. 53 Operational Training Unit RAF, as well as being an Aircraft Storage Unit (A.S.U.)

RAF Rhoose was constructed during 1941/42 with a cross-shaped runway configuration. The perimeter track formed a square around the airfield, joining up the runways. Four, Extra Over blister hangars were constructed (these could each hold four de Havilland Mosquito sized aircraft) and other hangars were planned but not initially constructed. The support buildings were situated on the southeast corner. Most of the other accommodation and administration building was to the east of the airfield.

=== Satellite station ===
In April 1942, No. 53 Operational Training Unit RAF moved into RAF Rhoose, becoming the first unit to be based there. The unit operated with Supermarine Spitfire, a single-seat fighter aircraft, and Miles Master, a two-seat monoplane advanced trainer aircraft. No. 53 OTU remained for roughly a year and then left for RAF Kirton in Lindsey in May 1943.

RAF Llandow was unused for eight months, until 8 February 1944, when No. 7 Air Gunners School RAF arrived from RAF Stormy Down. It used RAF Rhoose as a satellite while RAF Stormy Down was being improved. It had poor drainage and a poor surface and needed extensive repairs and hard runways. The unit was formed of twenty-three Avro Anson, a twin-engined, multi-role aircraft and twenty Miles Martinet target tug aircraft. All forty-three aircraft along with the pilots and ground crew moved over to RAF Rhoose.

No. 587 Squadron RAF, an anti-aircraft co-operation squadron, briefly used RAF Rhoose in early 1944, operating Miles Martinet aircraft. They were attached to Thornbury Maritime Royal Artillery Range, but returned to RAF Pengam Moors in May 1944.

The repair work at RAF Stormy Down took longer than expected and No. 7 AGS, aircraft and personnel, moved back there on 2 August 1944.

=== Maintenance Unit ===
From 1 November 1944 the airfield was repurposed for storage. RAF Rhoose was transferred to No. 40 Group RAF, RAF Maintenance Command. It became a sub-site of No. 214 Maintenance Unit RAF, at Newport. No. 59 Maintenance Unit RAF, an explosives storage unit, arrived on 15 April 1946, having used RAF Rhoose as a detached site since 6 June 1945. The unit disbanded on 29 February 1947.

After the disbandment of No. 59 M.U. And the sub-site of No. 214 M.U. the airfield closed at the beginning of 1948 and fell into disuse for four years.

Other units included:

- No. 65 Gliding School RAF (1944-??)

=== Cardiff Airport ===
Charter flights were using the aerodrome by 1950 and in 1952, Aer Lingus began to operate a service between Cardiff and Dublin. On 1 April 1954, the airfield became the base for Cambrian Airways and all civil flying was transferred from RAF Pengam Moors. In April 1965 Glamorgan County Council took over the airport and by this time a terminal and hangar had been constructed. In 1978, the airport became known officially as Cardiff airport.

== Units ==
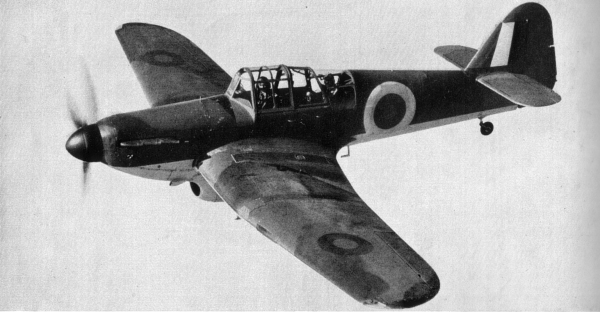
Miles Master, a two-seat monoplane advanced trainer aircraft, an example of those used by No. 53 OTU

During the course of the operation of the station, the following units were at sometime based at RAF Rhoose:

04/42 to 05/43, No. 53 Operational Training Unit.

02/44 to 08/44, No. 7 Air Gunners School.

11/44 to 02/47, No. 59 Maintenance Unit.

05/44 to ? No. 65 Glider School

No. 65 EGS / W65 EGS tbc

== Post-RAF and Current use ==
The site is currently owned by the Welsh Government, operating at it as Cardiff International Airport Ltd.

== See also ==
- Cardiff Airport, which now occupies the site
- RAF Llandow, parent airfield and home of No. 53 Operational Training Unit RAF
- MOD St Athan, a separate but close by RAF station
- RAF Stormy Down, parent airfield and home of No. 7 Air Gunnery School RAF
