= RAF Rednal =

Former Royal Air Force station in Shropshire, England

RAF Rednal
- Oswestry, Shropshire in England

Site information
- Type: Royal Air Force station
- Owner: Air Ministry
- Operator: Royal Air Force
- Controlled by: RAF Fighter Command * No. 9 Group RAF * No. 81 (OTU) Group RAF

Location
- Shown within Shropshire
- Coordinates: 52°50′28″N 2°55′57″W

Site history
- Built: 1941/42
- In use: April 1942 - 1945
- Battles/wars: European theatre of World War II

Airfield information
- Elevation: 300 feet (91 m) AMSL
Runways
Direction	Length and surface
00/00	Concrete
00/00	Concrete
00/00	Concrete

Royal Air Force Rednal, or more simply RAF Rednal, is a former Royal Air Force station located near Oswestry in Shropshire, England.

== History ==
=== R.A.F. use ===
The airfield was laid out in 1941. It involved the requisition of much farmland, notably at Haughton to the south where the perimeter track ran along the back of the Haughton Farm and only a few yards away from the farmhouse was a storage area holding 9,000 gallons of high octane aircraft fuel. Because of the latter home's closeness to the flight path, it was given by the RAF a reinforced steel kitchen table under which occupants could shelter in emergencies.

It began operational use the following year, when the airfield was initially a training base for Supermarine Spitfire pilots. At its highest strength it had 1,600 servicemen and women stationed there, accommodated in huts dispersed widely among the woods and fields for a considerable distance. The remote station arranged special stops at the nearest railway line for trains to embark or disembark personnel.

In the summer of 1944 it accepted wounded personnel from the Normandy landings for onward transmission to military hospitals elsewhere in Shropshire. In 1945 the services provided by the station were removed to Keevil, Wiltshire and the airfield was vacated in 1946 although it was not sold by the Air Ministry until 1962.

=== Units stationed ===
The following units were here at some point:

- No. 6 Anti-Aircraft Co-operation Unit RAF
- No. 7 Anti-Aircraft Co-operation Unit RAF
- No. 61 Operational Training Unit RAF
  - 'Q' Flight RAF was reformed here during October 1943 as part of No. 61 OTU and operated Gloster Gladiators and Vickers Wellingtons before being disbanded still here during January 1944
- No. 2803 Squadron RAF Regiment

=== Present day ===
Many of the station outbuildings were extant as of 2013 and the airfield held the headquarters of The Classic and Vintage Aeroplane Company who operated displays of restored vintage aircraft at air shows and other major events.

== Memorials ==
At the roadside at the entrance to the airfield is a memorial stone with plaque to a Belgian pilot, Jean Joseph Albert Noizet who was killed in a training flight from Rednal on 22 August 1943 when his aircraft crashed into woods near Lilleshall, Shropshire. On an outbuilding of Haughton Farm (private property, above mentioned) is a plaque in memory of another trainee pilot, Sergeant Pilot S.P. Lister who was killed on 8 September 1942 when his Spitfire, while taking off from a runway, crash landed on the premises.
