= No. 55 Operational Training Unit RAF =

Operational Training Unit of the Royal Air Force

No. 55 Operational Training Unit RAF

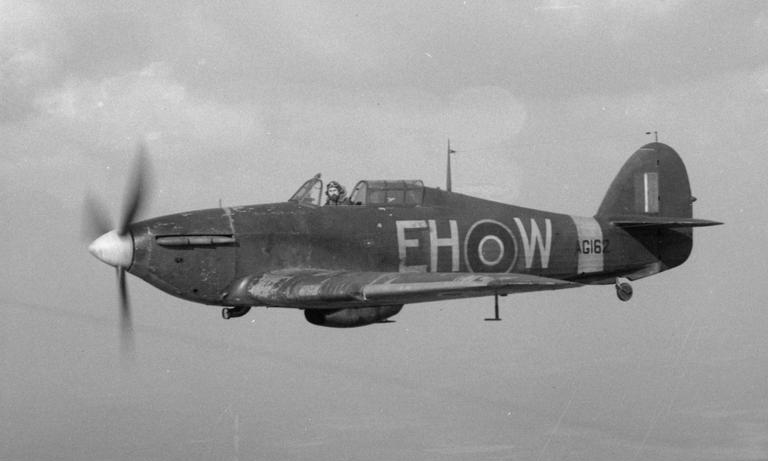
- 55 OTU Hurricane Mk X in flight c1941
- Active: 1 November 1940 – 26 January 1944; 18 December 1944 - 14 June 1945
- Country: United Kingdom
- Branch: Royal Air Force
- Type: Operational Training Unit
- Role: Fighter Pilot Flight Training
- Part of: No. 10 Group RAF; No. 81 Group RAF; No. 9 Group RAF; No. 12 Group RAF

No. 55 Operational Training Unit RAF (55 OTU) was an Operational Training Unit of the Royal Air Force, formed in November 1940 at RAF Aston Down to train fighter pilots.

== History ==
No. 55 Operational Training Unit RAF was an Operational Training Unit of the Royal Air Force, formed in November 1940 at RAF Aston Down, in Gloucestershire, to train fighter pilots, formed initially from No. 5 OTU, flying Hawker Hurricane single seat fighter aircraft, Supermarine Spitfire single seat fighter aircraft and Bristol Blenheim, a twin-engined light bomber. When the unit initially formed it was under the control of No. 10 Group, but at the end of December 1944, it was transferred over to No. 81 Group. From March 1941 No. 55 OTU was posted to RAF Usworth in Sunderland, flying Hawker Hurricane. In July 1941 one pilot was lost flying a Hurricane from RAF Usworth in Sunderland. In April 1942 the unit was transferred to RAF Annan in Dumfriesshire, flying Miles Master, a two-seat advanced trainer and Hawker Typhoon fighter-bomber. Around one year later the unit was transferred to No. 9 Group. It disbanded on 26 January 1944, at RAF Annan, to become No. 4 Tactical Exercise Unit RAF.

No. 4 Tactical Exercise Unit RAF was operational for only three months when it was disbanded and redesignated No. 3 Tactical Exercise Unit RAF, itself a reformation, on 21 March 1944, at RAF Annan. During 1944 the unit relocated to RAF Aston Down, where it disbanded after nine months of operations on 18 December 1944, to be redesignated No. 55 Operational Training Unit.

In December 1944, when No. 55 OTU reformed at RAF Aston Down, it was part of No. 12 Group. The unit was equipped with over a hundred Hawker Typhoon aircraft, and acted as a ground attack training unit until it was disbanded in June 1945.

No. 55 OTU can trace its existence back to No. 12 Group Pool RAF which formed on 15 September 1939 at RAF Aston Down. It operated with a variety of aircraft: Gloster Gladiator I, Avro Tutor, Fairey Battle, North American Harvard I, Bristol Blenheim I and Hawker Hurricane I. It remained operational for around six months and then disbanded on 6 March 1940 to become No. 5 Operational Training Unit.

No. 5 Operational Training Unit RAF was essentially a redesignation of No. 12 Group Pool, and it absorbed its aircraft but also operated with, Boulton Paul Defiant, Supermarine Spitfire I, Miles Magister and Miles Master I. No. 5 OTU disbanded on 1 November 1940, at RAF Aston Down, to become No. 55 Operational Training Unit RAF.

== See also ==
- List of Royal Air Force Operational Training Units
