= Grandsable Cemetery =

Cemetery east of Falkirk, Scotland

Coordinates: 55°59′37″N 3°43′39″W

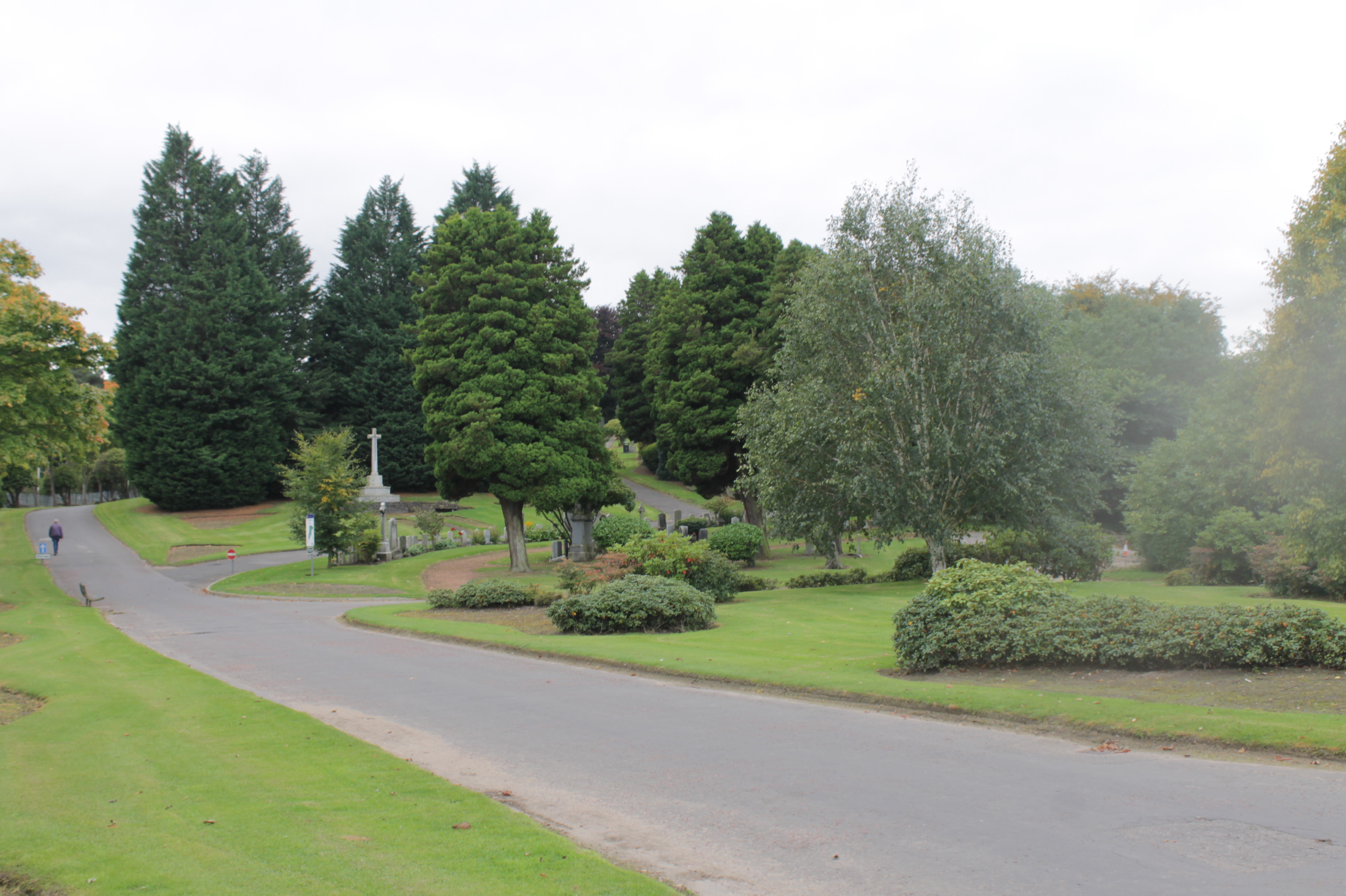
Grandsable Cemetery from the north

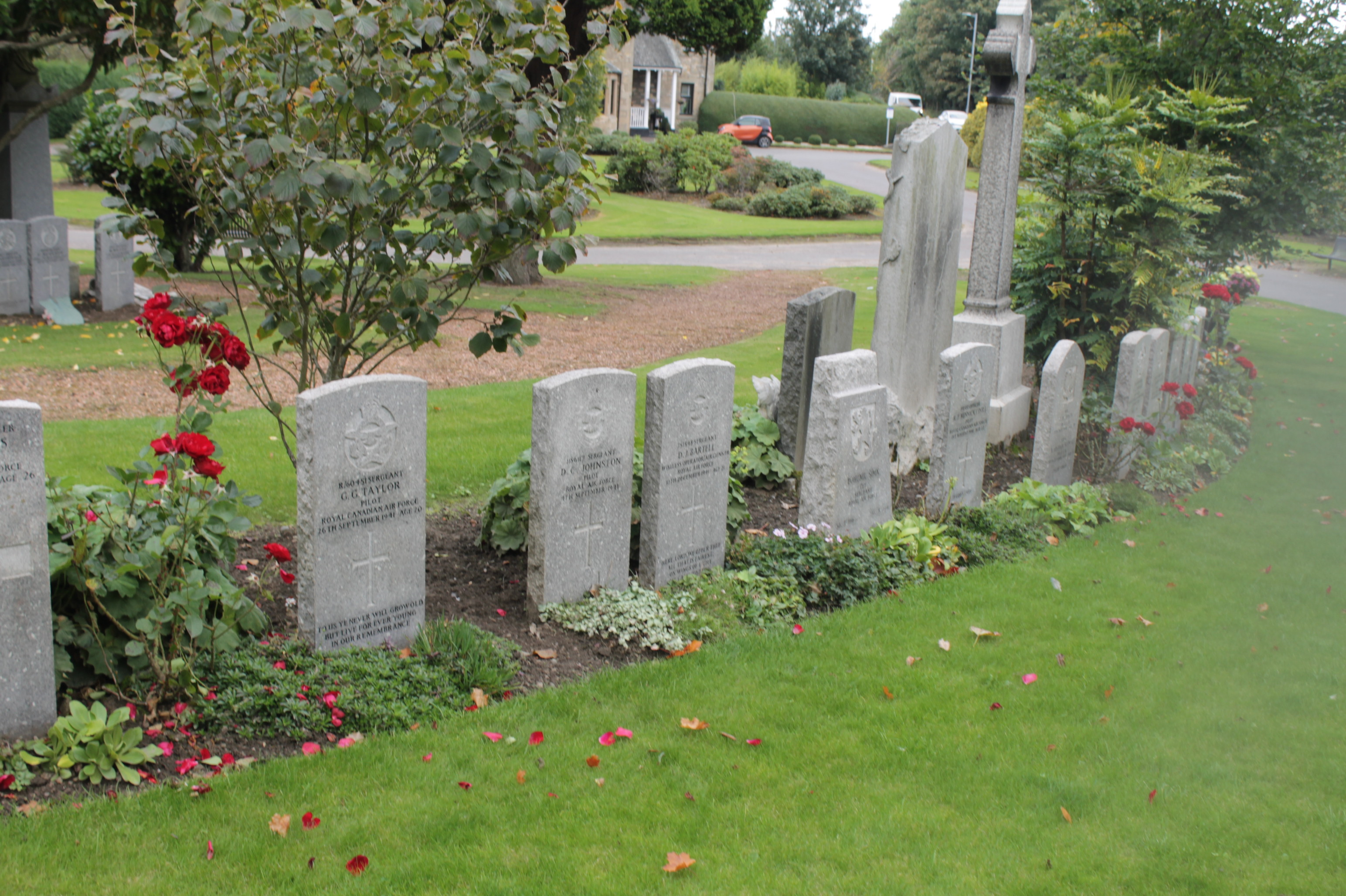
Polish, Czech and British war graves, Grandsable Cemetery

Grandsable Cemetery (sometimes called Grangemouth Cemetery) lies east of Falkirk, between the A9 and A803 south of Grangemouth near Polmont. It lies on a small hill with views over the Firth of Forth. It is well-maintained with a mature and well-laid landscape. The cemetery is operated by Falkirk Council.

== Background ==
The cemetery was founded in the early 20th century. The land was purchased in 1901 but the first burial appears to be in 1910. Unlike most Scottish cemeteries of the period it reverted to a curvilinear layout, more typical of cemeteries at their outset in the 1840s.

Its proximity to RAF Grangemouth accounts for a high number of pilots. Over and above this there are an abnormal number of accidental deaths relating to local mining, shipping and flying incidents. There are also a high number of "secondary memorials" to fallen sons - buried in France and Flanders during the First World War.

It has a number of war graves of those dying of wounds having safely reached home including several Polish pilots flying with the RAF.

In total it has 91 war graves, 22 of which are from the First World War.

== New Grandsable ==
New Grandsable was opened in the early 21st century to complement the original cemetery providing woodland burials, on a site west of the original.
