= RAF Kinnell =

Former Royal Air Force station in Angus, Scotland

RAF Kinnell
- Friockheim, Angus in Scotland

Site information
- Type: Royal Air Force satellite station
- Code: KL
- Owner: Air Ministry
- Operator: Royal Air Force
- Controlled by: RAF Fighter Command; 1942-44 * No. 9 Group RAF * No. 81 (OTU) Group RAF; RAF Flying Training Command; 1944-45; RAF Maintenance Command 1945

Location
- Shown within Angus RAF Kinnell (the United Kingdom)
- Coordinates: 56°38′55″N 002°38′14″W

Site history
- Built: 1941/42
- In use: 1942-1945
- Battles/wars: European theatre of World War II

Airfield information
- Elevation: 46 metres (151 ft) AMSL
Runways
Direction	Length and surface
00/00	Asphalt
00/00	Asphalt

Royal Air Force Kinnell or more simply RAF Kinnell is a former Royal Air Force satellite station located near to Friockheim, Angus, Scotland.

== History ==
The following units were here at some point:

- Satellite of No. 1 Combat Training Wing RAF (1943-44)
- Satellite of No. 1 Tactical Exercise Unit RAF (January - July 1944)
- Satellite of No. 2 Flying Instructors School (Advanced) RAF (September 1944 - July 1945)
- Relief Landing Ground of No. 9 (Pilots) Advanced Flying Unit RAF (September 1944)
- Satellite of No. 44 Maintenance Unit RAF (MU) (August 1945 - ?)
- Satellite of No. 56 Operational Training Unit RAF (March 1942 - October 1943)
- Satellite of No. 260 MU RAF (November 1945 - ?)

== Current use ==
The site is now used as farmland.
