= Colin McMullen =

Australian-born Royal Air Force officer

Colin C. McMullen
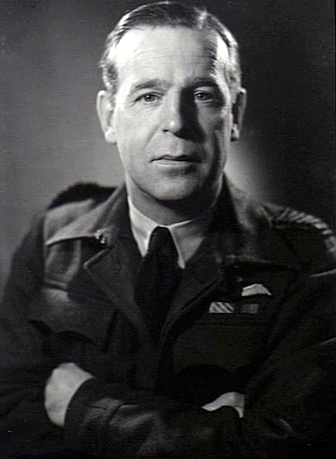
- Group Captain C.C. McMullen in March 1945
- Born: 27 August 1908; Summer Hill, New South Wales, Australia
- Died: 17 February 1954 (aged 45); Hungerford, United Kingdom
- Military career
- Allegiance: United Kingdom
- Branch: Royal Air Force
- Service years: 1931–54
- Rank: Air Commodore
- Commands: No. 81 Group (1954); RAF Bardney (c. 1944); No. 109 Squadron (c. 1941); No. 79 Squadron (1939–40)
- Conflicts: World War II
- Awards: Commander of the Order of the British Empire; Air Force Cross; Mentioned in Despatches (2)

Air Commodore Colin Campbell McMullen, CBE, AFC (27 August 1908 – 17 February 1954) was an Australian-born Royal Air Force (RAF) officer. McMullen was educated in Sydney, and commissioned as an officer in the RAF after moving to the United Kingdom in 1931. During World War II he commanded two flying squadrons, as well as an air station. He continued to serve after the war and was appointed to command a group shortly before his death in 1954.

== Early life ==
McMullen was born in Summer Hill, New South Wales, on 27 August 1908, the son of Frank and Blanche MacMullen, and was educated at Fort Street High School before completing a degree in veterinary studies at the University of Sydney. A well-known rugby union player, he was a member of the University and Drummoyne teams. He was also a member of an air cadet unit located at Royal Australian Air Force Station Richmond.

== RAF career ==
McMullen moved from Australia to the United Kingdom in 1931 to continue flight training, and received a temporary commission as an officer in the Royal Air Force (RAF) shortly afterwards. This commission was later made permanent. He placed first in a flying course conducted at RAF Station Grantham in early 1932, and was later trained to operate combat aircraft at RAF Tangmere. On 1 March 1933 a fighter aircraft he was piloting collided with another RAF plane. McMullen escaped with only minor injuries after successfully making an emergency landing, but the pilot of the other aircraft was killed.

In January 1939 McMullen was appointed commander of a fighter unit, No. 79 Squadron, and led it following the outbreak of World War II until February 1940. In July 1940 he was mentioned in despatches for "meritorious service with the RAF". In December 1941 McMullen assumed command of No. 109 Squadron, a unit responsible for the development of new technologies. McMullen was responsible for encouraging Don Bennett to try the de Havilland Mosquito, which proved crucial for the effective use of the Oboe target finding device.

McMullen was promoted acting wing commander on 11 March 1943, and awarded an Air Force Cross in the 1943 New Year Honours. McMullen was raised to temporary group captain on 21 January 1944. As the commanding officer of RAF Bardney he led the deployment of two squadrons of Avro Lancaster bombers to the Soviet Union in September that year during Operation Paravane, an attack on the German battleship Tirpitz in northern Norway. He also led the deployment of these squadrons to Scotland during the two subsequent attacks on the Tirpitz, Operation Obviate in October and Operation Catechism in November. McMullen was mentioned in despatches again on 1 January 1945. On 1 January 1946 he was appointed a Commander of the Order of the British Empire (CBE).

McMullen was permanently promoted to the rank of group captain on 22 July 1947. He was raised to air commodore in January 1954, and appointed the commanding officer of No. 81 Group. On 17 February that year he collapsed at Hungerford while driving and subsequently died.
