= RAF Winfield =

Former Royal Air Force station in Scottish Borders, Scotland

RAF Winfield
- Paxton, Scottish Borders in Scotland

Site information
- Type: Satellite Station
- Code: IW
- Owner: Air Ministry
- Operator: Royal Air Force
- Controlled by: RAF Fighter Command * No. 9 Group RAF * No. 13 Group RAF * No. 81 (OTU) Group RAF

Location
- Shown within the Scottish Borders RAF Winfield (the United Kingdom)
- Coordinates: 55°44′56″N 002°09′52″W

Site history
- Built: 1941/42
- Built by: James Miller & Partners Ltd
- In use: May 1942 - May 1945
- Battles/wars: European theatre of World War II

Airfield information
- Elevation: 52 metres (171 ft) AMSL
Runways
Direction	Length and surface
00/00	Tarmac
00/00	Tarmac

Royal Air Force Winfield or more simply RAF Winfield is a former Royal Air Force satellite station located near Paxton, Scottish Borders, Scotland and west of Berwick-upon-Tweed, Northumberland, England.

The following units were here at some point:

- Satellite for No. 54 Operational Training Unit RAF (May 1942 - May 1945)
- A detachment from No. 88 Squadron RAF (1941-42)
- No. 222 Squadron RAF during August 1942 with the Supermarine Spitfire Vb
