= RAF Montford Bridge =

Former Royal Air Force station in Shropshire, England

RAF Montford Bridge
- Montford Bridge, Shropshire in England
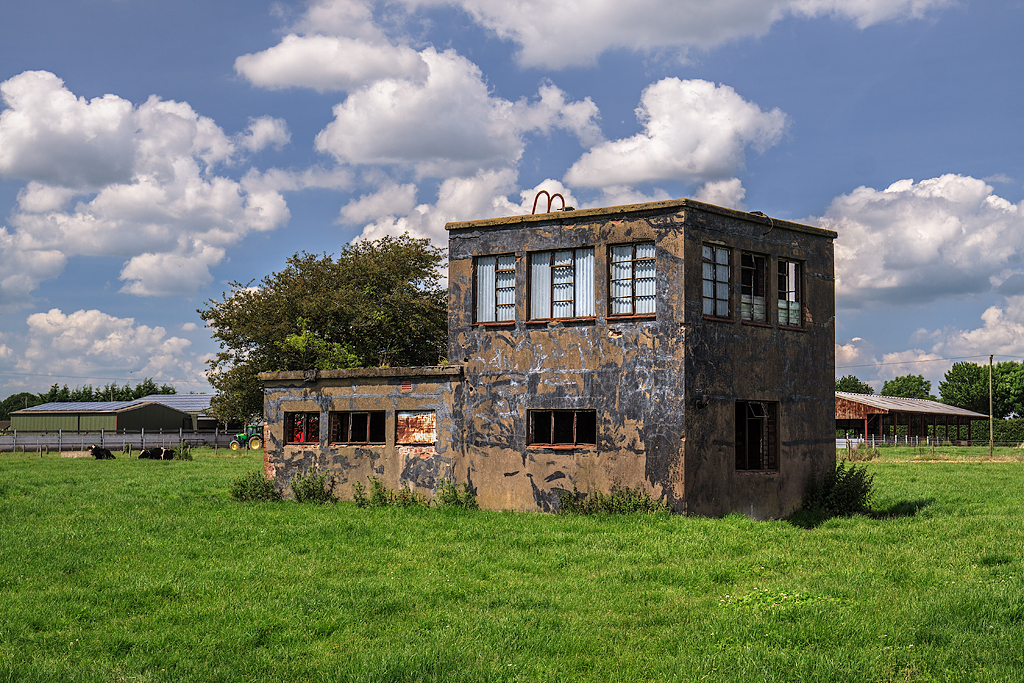
- Ruins of the watch office in 2019

Site information
- Type: Satellite Station
- Code: MD
- Owner: Air Ministry
- Operator: Royal Air Force
- Controlled by: RAF Fighter Command * No. 9 Group RAF * No. 81 (OTU) Group RAF

Location
- Shown within Shropshire
- Coordinates: 52°44′54″N 002°50′47″W

Site history
- Built: 1941/42
- In use: April 1942 - December 1945
- Battles/wars: European theatre of World War II

Airfield information
- Elevation: 265 feet (81 m) AMSL
Runways
Direction	Length and surface
00/00	Tarmac
00/00	Tarmac
00/00	Tarmac

Royal Air Force Montford Bridge, or more simply RAF Montford Bridge, is a former Royal Air Force satellite station, located near Shrewsbury, Shropshire, England.

== History ==
The following units were here at some point:

- No. 7 Anti-Aircraft Co-operation Unit RAF
- No. 11 (Pilots) Advanced Flying Unit RAF
- No. 34 Maintenance Unit RAF
- No. 61 Operational Training Unit (1942-45)
- A detachment of No. 577 Squadron RAF

== Current use ==
The site is currently used as farmland.
