= No. 607 Squadron RAuxAF =

No. 607 (County of Durham) Squadron RAuxAF
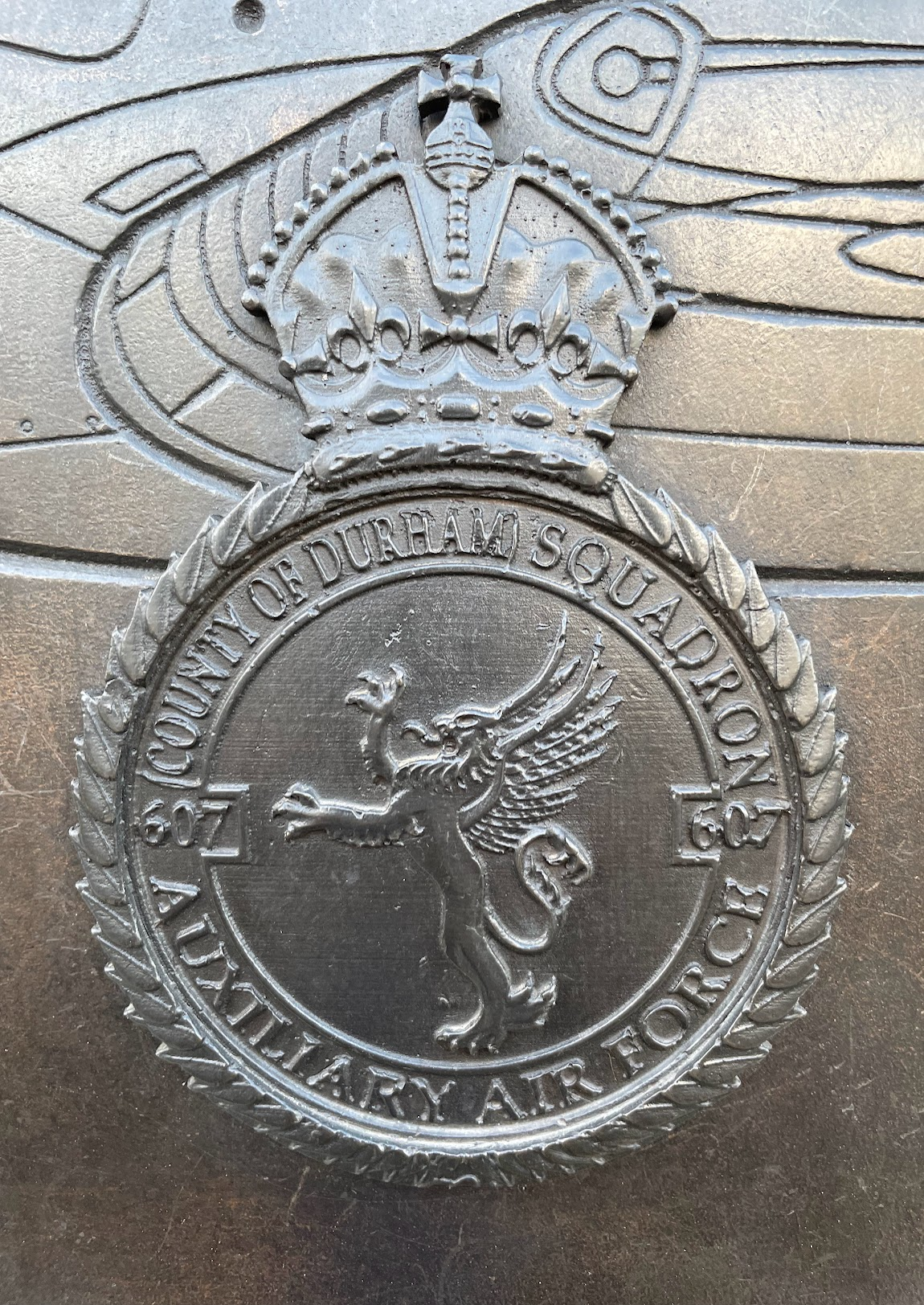
- Heraldic badge of the squadron displayed on the Battle of Britain Monument in London
- Active: 17 March 1930 – 31 July 1945; 10 May 1946 – 10 March 1957; 5 January 2015 – present
- Country: United Kingdom
- Branch: Royal Air Force
- Part of: Royal Auxiliary Air Force
- Nickname: County of Durham
- post 1951 aircraft insignia
- Battle honours: France & Low Countries, 1939–40; Battle of Britain, 1940; Fortress Europe, 1941–42; Channel & North Sea, 1942; Arakan, 1942–44; Manipur, 1944; Burma, 1944–45; These seven honours are emblazoned on the squadron standard

Commanders
- Honorary Air Commodore: The Marquess of Londonderry (1932–1939); The Viscount Runciman of Doxford (1939–1957); Lady Charlotte Peel, The Countess Peel (2015–present)

Insignia
- Squadron Badge heraldry: A winged lion salient, the hind legs also winged
- Squadron Codes: LW (March 1939 – September 1939); AF (September 1939 – May 1945); RAN (June 1946 – 1949); LA (1949 – April 1951)

No. 607 (County of Durham) Squadron is an auxiliary squadron of the Royal Air Force. It was formed in 1930 as a bomber unit in the Auxiliary Air Force and changed in 1936 to the fighter role. It fought in that role during the Second World War in Europe and Asia. After the war, in 1946, the squadron reformed as a fighter unit. Awarded the title Royal Auxiliary Air Force by King George in 1947, 607 Sqn was disbanded with all the other flying units of the RAuxAF on 10 March 1957. It reformed on 5 January 2015, as a General Service Support Squadron (GSS).

== History ==
=== Formation and early years ===
No. 607 Squadron was formed on 17 March 1930 at the then new airfield of RAF Usworth, County Durham as a day bomber unit of the Auxiliary Air Force (AuxAF). They became operational in the summer of 1933, having received their first aircraft in December 1932, flying Westland Wapitis. First commanding officer was Walter Leslie Runciman (later the 2nd Viscount Runciman of Doxford). In September 1936 the squadron was told that it was to re-role to a fighter squadron and was re-equipped with Hawker Demons. In the run up to WW2, 607 received Gloster Gladiators, which arrived in December 1938.

=== Second World War ===
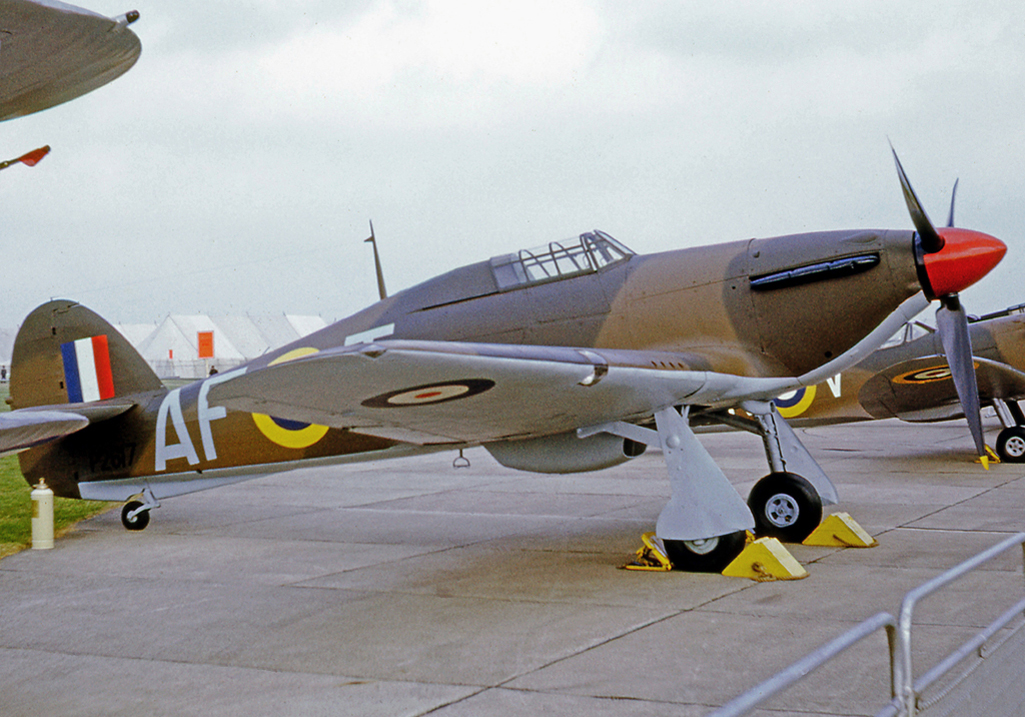
Hawker Hurricane I operated by 607 Squadron in 1940 and preserved postwar in period marks including the unit's AF code letters.

Having achieved their first success downing a DO 18 flying boat in the North Sea and still equipped with Gladiators, the squadron was deployed to France as part of the Air Component of the British Expeditionary Force in November 1939. During the Battle of France, the squadron operated from various locations, including Saint-Inglevert. In March 1940, the squadron was re-equipped with Hawker Hurricanes, just in time to effectively operate against the modern Luftwaffe aircraft during the Blitzkrieg. Following the British withdrawal, the squadron returned to the UK and served throughout the Battle of Britain, firstly in the air defence of the North East of England then on the South coast with 11Gp. In October 1941, the Squadron moved to RAF Manston and remained there undertaking anti shipping operations and cross channel fighter sweeps until 1942. During this period, 607 became the first unit to operate the Hurricane in the fighter bomber role and using their "Hurri-bombers" destroyed or damaged several enemy support vessels during the German capital ships "Channel dash!" on 12 February 1942.

During 1942, the Squadron was transported to India. There, it joined No. 166 Wing RAF on 25 May 1942. In September 1943, the Squadron's Hurricanes were replaced with Supermarine Spitfires. This change in machine, made the squadron the first unit in South East Asia Command to operate such aircraft. It re-equipped with the Spitfire Mk.VIII in March 1944, and flew these in support of XIV Army, including the Imphal and Kohima actions, until disbanding on 19 August 1945 at Mingaladon in Burma.

607 were one of the last units to finish operations in this theatre.

=== Post-war ===
On 10 May 1946, No. 607 Squadron reformed at RAF Ouston as a day fighter squadron of the Royal Auxiliary Air Force. After flying Spitfire F.14 and F.22s for five years, it converted to De Havilland Vampires. These were flown until February 1957 when, along with all the other flying units of the RAuxAF, it was disbanded on 10 March 1957.

=== Reformation ===
Re-formed 5 January 2015, the squadron is now a General Service Support Squadron (GSS) and operates from RAF Leeming in North Yorkshire. The squadron has an established strength of almost 120 staff and has won awards for its recruitment and retention abilities.

== Aircraft operated ==
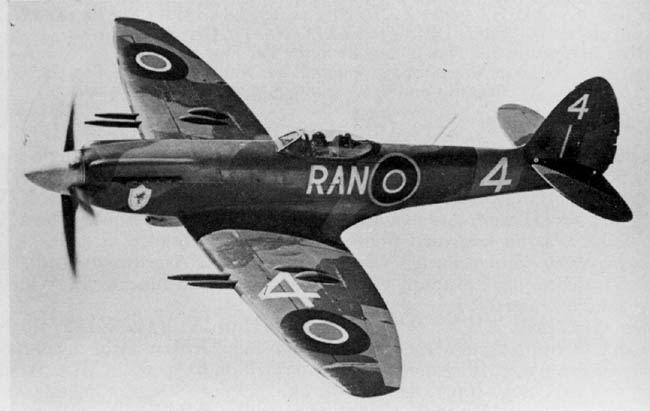
A Spitfire F.22 from No. 607 Squadron with the squadron badge on the cowling and racing number "4" for the Cooper Trophy race of 1948

Aircraft operated by no. 607 Squadron RAF, data from
From	To	Aircraft	Version
December 1932	January 1937	Westland Wapiti	Mk.IIa
September 1936	August 1939	Hawker Demon	
December 1938	May 1940	Gloster Gladiator	Mks.I, II
March 1940	September 1941	Hawker Hurricane	Mk.I
June 1941	November 1941	Hawker Hurricane	Mk.IIa
July 1941	March 1942	Hawker Hurricane	Mk.IIb
June 1942	February 1943	Hawker Hurricane	Mk.IIc
February 1943	September 1943	Hawker Hurricane	Mk.IIb
September 1943	March 1944	Supermarine Spitfire	Mk.Vc
March 1944	July 1945	Supermarine Spitfire	Mk.VIII
November 1946	March 1949	Supermarine Spitfire	F.14
January 1949	June 1951	Supermarine Spitfire	F.22
March 1951	March 1957	De Havilland Vampire	FB.5
April 1956	February 1957	De Havilland Vampire	FB.9

== Squadron locations ==
Airfields used by no. 607 Squadron RAF, data from
From	To	Airfield
17 March 1930	12 August 1939	RAF Usworth, County Durham
12 August 1939	24 August 1939	RAF Abbotsinch, Renfrewshire, Scotland Annual Summer Camp only.
24 August 1939	9 October 1939	RAF Usworth, County Durham
9 October 1939	14 November 1939	RAF Acklington, Northumberland (Det. at RAF Drem, East Lothian, Scotland)
14 November 1939	15 November 1939	RAF Croydon, Surrey
15 November 1939	13 December 1939	Merville, France
13 December 1939	12 April 1940	Vitry-en-Artois, France (Dets. at Abbeville and Saint-Inglevert)
12 April 1940	26 April 1940	Abbeville, France
26 April 1940	18 May 1940	Vitry-en-Artois, France
18 May 1940	22 May 1940	Norrent-Fontes, France
22 May 1940	4 June 1940	RAF Croydon, Surrey
4 June 1940	1 September 1940	RAF Usworth, County Durham
1 September 1940	10 October 1940	RAF Tangmere, West Sussex
10 October 1940	8 November 1940	RAF Turnhouse, Fife, Scotland
8 November 1940	12 December 1940	RAF Drem, East Lothian, Scotland
12 December 1940	16 January 1941	RAF Usworth, County Durham
16 January 1941	2 March 1941	RAF Macmerry, East Lothian, Scotland
2 March 1941	16 April 1941	RAF Drem, East Lothian, Scotland
16 April 1941	27 July 1941	RAF Skitten, Caithness, Scotland
27 July 1941	20 August 1941	RAF Castletown, Caithness, Scotland
20 August 1941	10 October 1941	RAF Martlesham Heath, Suffolk
10 October 1941	21 March 1942	RAF Manston, Kent
21 March 1942	25 May 1942	en route to British India
25 May 1942	23 August 1942	RAF Alipore, Bengal
23 August 1942	16 December 1942	RAF Jessore, Bengal
16 December 1942	23 January 1943	RAF Feni, Bengal
23 January 1943	2 April 1943	RAF Chittagong, Bengal
2 April 1943	1 October 1943	RAF Alipore, Bengal
1 October 1943	15 October 1943	RAF Amarda Road, Bengal
15 October 1943	29 November 1943	RAF Alipore, Bengal
29 November 1943	25 February 1944	RAF Ramu, Bengal
25 February 1944	21 March 1944	RAF Nidania, Bengal
21 March 1944	17 April 1944	RAF Rumkhapalong ('Rumkha'), Bengal
17 April 1944	27 April 1944	RAF Wangjing, Manipur
27 April 1944	6 July 1944	RAF Imphal, Manipur
6 July 1944	24 November 1944	RAF Baigachi, Bengal
24 November 1944	11 December 1944	RAF Sapam, Manipur
11 December 1944	16 January 1945	RAF Tulihal, Manipur
16 January 1945	5 April 1945	RAF Tabingaung, Burma
5 April 1945	19 April 1945	RAF Dwehla, Burma
19 April 1945	28 April 1945	RAF Kwetnge, Burma
28 April 1945	8 May 1945	RAF Kalaywa, Burma
8 May 1945	14 May 1945	RAF Thedaw, Burma (Det. at 'Tennant' airfield, Burma)
14 May 1945	19 August 1945	RAF Mingaladon, Burma
10 May 1946	10 March 1957	RAF Ouston, County Durham
16 July 1951	20 August 1951	RAF Thornaby, North Yorkshire (detachment)
20 August 1951	10 September 1951	RAF Linton-on-Ouse, North Yorkshire (detachment)
10 September 1951	10 October 1951	RAF Acklington, Northumberland (detachment)
10 October 1951	10 March 1957	RAF Ouston, Northumberland
January 2015	present	RAF Leeming, North Yorkshire

== Commanding officers ==
Officers commanding no. 607 Squadron RAF, data from
From	To	Name
March 1930	January 1939	S/Ldr. W.L. Runciman
January 1939	May 1940	S/Ldr. L.E. Smith
May 1940	May 1940	S/Ldr G.M.Fidler Sqd OB May 1940
18 May 1940	October 1940	S/Ldr J.A. Vick Sqd OB May 1940
October 1940	March 1941	S/Ldr. A.W. Vincent
March 1941	November 1941	S/Ldr. G.D. Craig
November 1941	December 1941	S/Ldr. H.C. Dawson
December 1941	October 1942	S/Ldr. N.J. Mowatt, DSO
October 1942	March 1943	S/Ldr. R.H. Holland, DFC
March 1943	April 1943	S/Ldr. N.J. Mowatt, DSO
April 1943	March 1944	S/Ldr. P.J.T. Stephenson, DFC
March 1944	May 1945	S/Ldr. G.G.A. Davies
May 1945	June 1945	S/Ldr. C.M. Humphreys
June 1945	August 1945	S/Ldr. C.O.J. Pegge, DFC
May 1946	1949	S/Ldr. J.R. Kyall, DSO, OBE, DFC
1949	1951	S/Ldr. J.M. Bazin, DSO, DFC
1951	September 1953	S/Ldr. A.B. Dunford, DFC
September 1953	June 1956	S/Ldr. J.A. Stephen
June 1956	March 1957	S/Ldr. G. Gray
January 2015	January 2015	Sqn Ldr A Hall
January 2015	June 2018	Wing commander A Dobson
February 2019		Wg Cdr M Shuttleworth

== See also ==
- List of Royal Air Force aircraft squadrons
