= RAF Annan =

Former Royal Air Force station in Dumfries and Galloway, Scotland

RAF Annan
- Near Annan, Dumfries and Galloway in Scotland
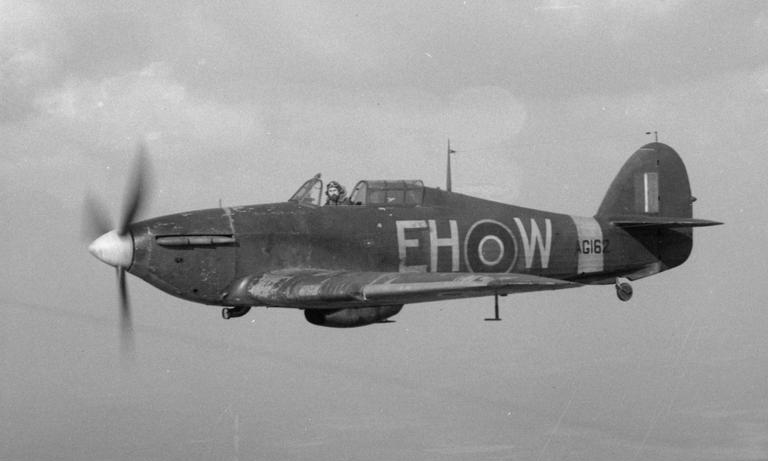
- Hurricane Mk. X (AG162 "EH-W") of No. 55 OTU

Site information
- Type: Royal Air Force station
- Code: AG
- Owner: Air Ministry
- Operator: Royal Air Force
- Controlled by: RAF Fighter Command 1942-44 * No. 9 Group RAF * No. 81 (OTU) Group RAF; RAF Maintenance Command 1944-

Location
- Shown within Dumfries and Galloway RAF Annan (the United Kingdom)
- Coordinates: 55°01′00″N 3°13′45″W
- Area: 154.10 hectares (380.8 acres)

Site history
- Built: 1941/42
- Built by: John Laing & Son Ltd
- In use: April 1942–1945
- Fate: Closed, now Chapelcross nuclear power station
- Battles/wars: European theatre of World War II

Airfield information
- Elevation: 30 feet (9 m) AMSL
Runways
| Direction | Length and surface |
|---|---|
| 04/22 | 4,843 feet (1,476 m) |
| 13/31 | 4,770 feet (1,454 m) |

Royal Air Force Annan or more simply RAF Annan is a former Royal Air Force station located about 2 miles (3.2 km) north-east of the town of Annan, Dumfries and Galloway, Scotland, which was operational during the Second World War.

== Station history ==
Initially serving as a sub-site of No. 18 Maintenance Unit in 1940–1941, RAF Annan was opened as an air station in April 1942 as the base for No. 55 Operational Training Unit RAF (OTU), to train fighter pilots. As part of No. 81 Group 55 OTU pilots flew at low level over the Solway Firth training to fly "Rhubarb" missions, crossing the English Channel to attack targets of opportunity in France and the Low Countries. Initially they flew Hawker Hurricanes; and later, Miles Master trainers and Hawker Typhoon fighter-bombers. In June 1943 55 OTU was transferred to No. 9 Group; and on 26 January 1944 was redesignated No. 4 Tactical Exercise Unit (TEU), then No. 3 TEU on 28 March 1944. No. 3 TEU moved to RAF Aston Down in July 1944, and Annan then served as a sub-site of No. 14 Maintenance Unit from August 1944 until August 1952.

== Units ==
The following units were based at RAF Annan:

- Sub-site, No. 18 Maintenance Unit RAF (1940 – 1941)
- No. 55 Operational Training Unit RAF (April 1942 – January 1944)
  - Night Conversion Unit (March – April 1944) (Part of 55 OTU)
  - No. 4 Tactical Exercise Unit (January – March 1944)
  - No. 3 Tactical Exercise Unit (March – May 1944)
- Detachment, No. 10 (Observers) Advanced Flying Unit RAF (April 1942)
- No. 107 Squadron RAF (August 1942)
- Sub-site, No. 14 Maintenance Unit RAF (August 1944 – August 1952)
- No. 56 (Maintenance) Wing RAF (July 1944 - May 1946)

== Station facilities ==
The air station had two concrete runways at right angles, running north-east/south-west (1,476 m (4,843 ft)), and north-west/south-east (1,454 m (4,770 ft)). The main technical area was in the north-eastern sector, and there were at least seven blister hangars around the perimeter. There was a camp about 600 metres (2,000 ft) north-east of the airfield near the village of Creca which contained various accommodation buildings, huts, and air raid shelters. Another camp existed about 500 metres (1,600 ft) south of the airfield.

== Fate ==
On 1 July 1955 the site was taken over for the construction of the Chapelcross nuclear power station.

== See also ==
- List of former Royal Air Force stations
