= No. 131 Squadron RAF =

Defunct flying squadron of the Royal Air Force

No. 131 (County of Kent) Squadron RAF
- Active: 1 March 1918 – 17 August 1918; 28 June 1941 – 10 June 1945; 26 June 1945 – 31 December 1945
- Country: United Kingdom
- Branch: Royal Air Force
- Nickname: County of Kent
- Mottos: Latin: Invicta ("Unconquered")

Insignia
- Squadron Badge: In front of an estoile of sixteen points, a horse forcene.
- Squadron Codes: NX (Jun 1941 – Dec 1945)

No. 131 (County of Kent) Squadron RAF was a Royal Air Force Squadron formed to be a bomber unit in World War I and reformed as a fighter unit in World War II.

== History ==
=== Formation and World War I ===
No. 131 Squadron Royal Flying Corps was formed on 1 March 1918 and became a unit of the Royal Air Force, but it disbanded on 17 August 1918 without becoming operational.

=== Reformation in World War II ===
The squadron reformed in 1941 at RAF Ouston as a fighter unit equipped with Spitfires and then provided air defence for convoys from RAF Atcham and Llanbedr in Wales. It moved to India in October 1944. The squadron re-assembled at Amarda Road on 5 February 1945 but its Spitfires were re-allocated to the Royal Indian Air Force and the squadron was disbanded on 10 June 1945. Sixteen days later, 134 Squadron was renumbered to 131 and was equipped with Thunderbolts to begin training to support the invasion of Malaya. It was disbanded on 31 December 1945 at Kuala Lumpur, Malaysia.

== Aircraft operated ==
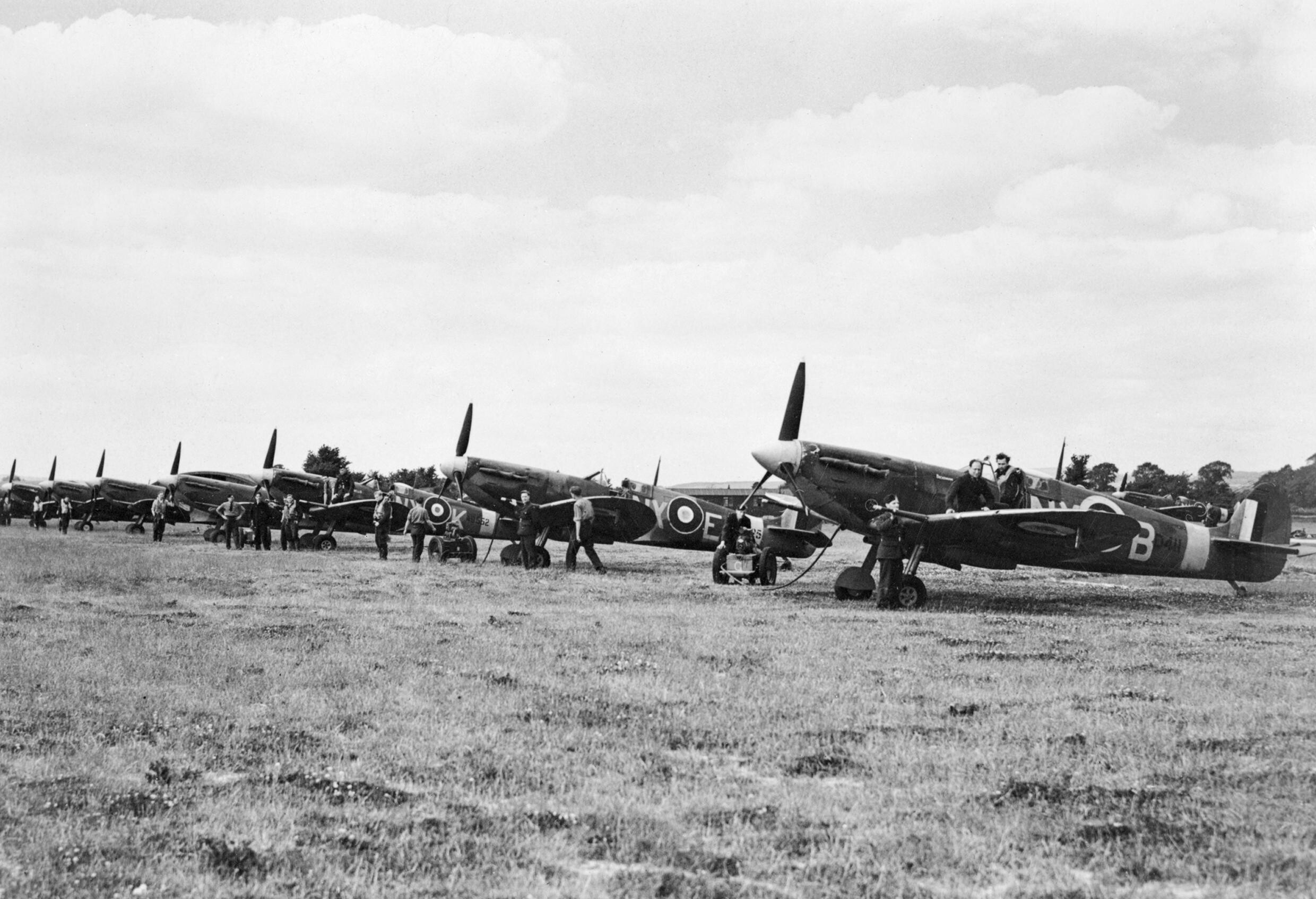
No. 131 Squadron Spitfires

Aircraft operated by no. 131 Squadron RAF
From	To	Aircraft	Variant
Jun 1941	Nov 1941	Supermarine Spitfire	IA
Sep 1941	Jan 1942	Supermarine Spitfire	IIA
Dec 1941	Sep 1943	Supermarine Spitfire	VB
Dec 1942	Sep 1943	Supermarine Spitfire	VC
Sep 1943	Mar 1944	Supermarine Spitfire	IX
Mar 1944	Oct 1944	Supermarine Spitfire	VII
Feb 1945	Jun 1945	Supermarine Spitfire	VIII
Jun 1945	Dec 1945	Republic P-47 Thunderbolt	II
