= RAF Poulton =

Former RAF base in Cheshire, England

RAF Poulton
- Near Poulton, Cheshire in England
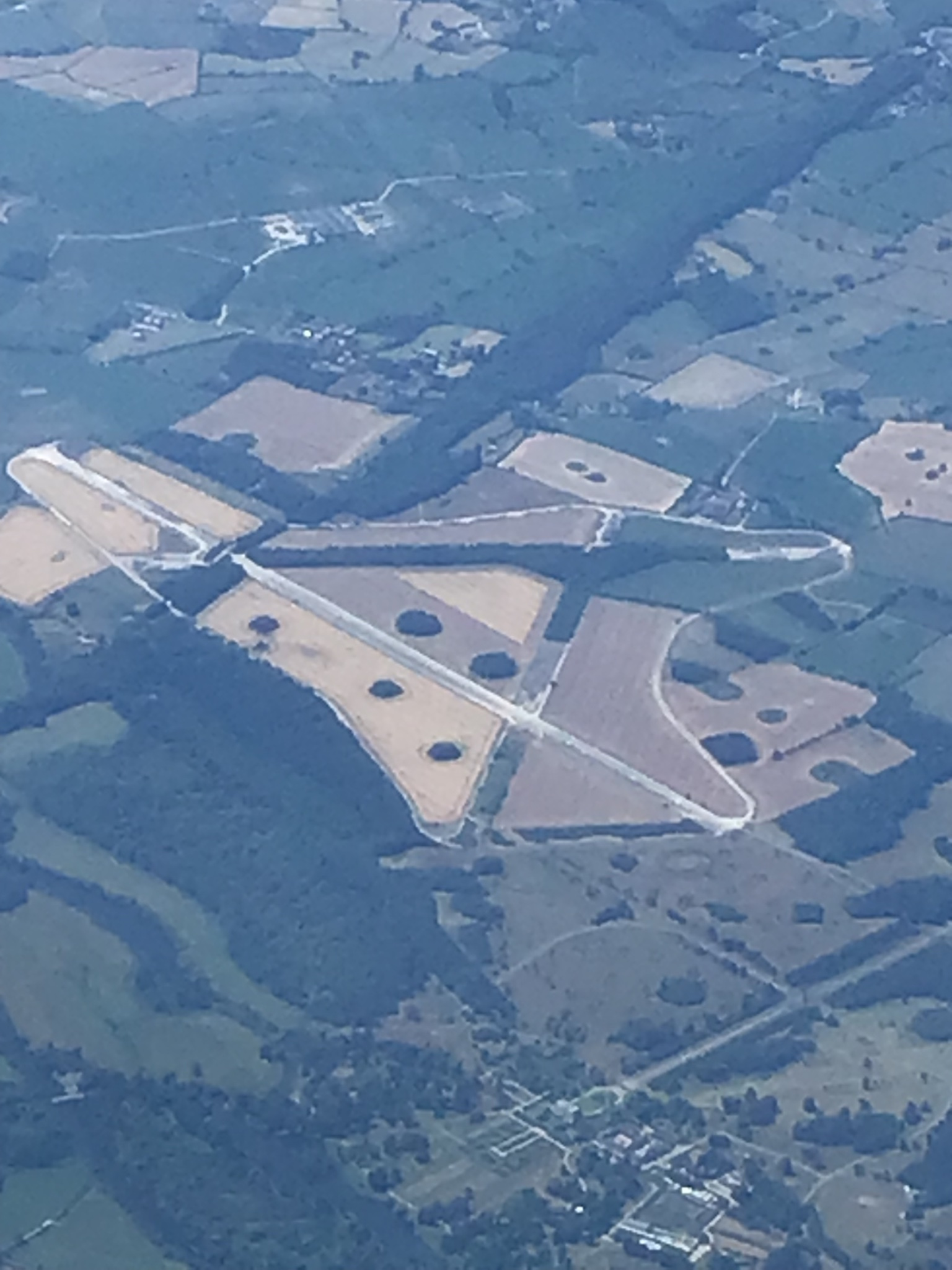
- RAF Poulton, July 2022

Site information
- Type: Royal Air Force satellite station
- Code: PU
- Owner: Air Ministry
- Operator: Royal Air Force
- Controlled by: RAF Fighter Command * No. 9 Group RAF * No. 81 (OTU) Group RAF

Location
- Shown within Cheshire RAF Poulton (the United Kingdom)
- Coordinates: 53°07′46″N 002°53′42″W

Site history
- Built: 1942/43
- Built by: George Wimpey & Co Ltd
- In use: March 1943 - August 1945
- Battles/wars: European theatre of World War II

Airfield information
- Elevation: 50 feet (15 m) AMSL
Runways
Direction	Length and surface
01/19	1,800 metres (5,906 ft) Concrete
06/24	1,245 metres (4,085 ft) Concrete
14/32	1,254 metres (4,114 ft) Concrete

Royal Air Force Poulton or more simply RAF Poulton (X4PL) is a former Royal Air Force satellite station located near Poulton, Cheshire and was operational from 1 March 1943 until 1945. It was used as an Operational Training Unit (OTU) and Tactical Exercise Unit (TEU) for Hawker Hurricanes.

== History ==
It was part of 12 Group and was used as a satellite of RAF Hawarden. It had 8 Blister and 1 Bessonneau hangars.

== Based units and aircraft ==
- No. 3 Tactical Exercise Unit RAF (TEU), using the Hawker Hurricane. Arrived Nov 43. Possibly moved to Aston Down on 18 Dec 44 and re-designated as No 55 OTU.
- No. 12 (Pilots) Advanced Flying Unit RAF ((P) AFU), using the Airspeed Oxford.
- No. 1515 (Beam Approach Training) Flight RAF, almost certainly using the Airspeed Oxford.
- No. 41 Operational Training Unit RAF (OTU) (Day Fighter Wing), possibly using the Hawker Hurricane. Moved to Poulton from Hawarden 1 Feb 45, and was re-designated as...
- No. 58 OTU on 15 Mar 45, using the Supermarine Spitfire. Disbanded 20 Jul 45.
- Detachment from No. 595 Squadron RAF

== Current use ==
Part of the site remains in use as a private airfield.

== See also ==
- List of former Royal Air Force stations
