= RAF Balado Bridge =

Former Royal Air Force station in Perth and Kinross, Scotland

RAF Balado Bridge
- Near Kinross, Perth and Kinross in Scotland
- T in the Park on the former Balado airfield in 2005

Site information
- Type: Royal Air Force satellite station
- Owner: Air Ministry
- Operator: Royal Air Force; War Department 1944-
- Controlled by: RAF Fighter Command * No. 81 (OTU) Group RAF

Location
- Shown within Perth and Kinross RAF Balado Bridge (the United Kingdom)
- Coordinates: 56°12′43″N 003°27′44″W

Site history
- Built: 1941
- In use: March 1942-1957
- Battles/wars: European theatre of World War II

Airfield information
- Elevation: 420 feet (128 m) AMSL
Runways
Direction	Length and surface
02/20	3,272 ft (997 m) Concrete
08/26	4,765 ft (1,452 m) Concrete

Royal Air Force Balado Bridge or more simply RAF Balado Bridge is a former Royal Air Force satellite station located 2 miles (3 kilometres) west of Kinross, in central Scotland. It opened in 1942 as a satellite airfield to RAF Grangemouth, and closed in 1957. It has since served as a NATO satellite station, a microlight flying base, and as the venue for the T in the Park music festival.

== History ==
=== Second World War ===
RAF Balado Bridge opened on 30 March 1942. The airfield would have been named "RAF Kinross" however the naming of airfields at the time avoided confusion with other place names. In this case it may have been confused with RAF Kinloss, near Forres, which was the home to No. 19 OTU, a Bomber Command OTU flying Armstrong Whitworth Whitleys. No. 58 Operational Training Unit RAF (03/1942 – 06/1944) was primarily based at RAF Grangemouth. It used RAF Balado as a satellite, to ease the pressure on the airfield at Grangemouth.

Balado Bridge had two runways, both made of concrete. The tower was of the Watch Office for Fighter Satellite Station type (it was updated throughout its life). There were two hangars, the larger of the two is a B1 type, designed by the engineers T Bedford as an aircraft repair shed, mainly for heavy bombers. This type first appeared in 1942 and was larger than the Bellman hangar which was also a temporary and transportable type. The smaller hangar was a Super Robin type. The airfield was taken over by the War Department in November 1944.

The following units were here at some point:

- Satellite site for No. 2 Combat Training Wing RAF (October 1943) became Satellite site for No. 2 Tactical Exercise Unit RAF (October 1943 – June 1944)
- Relief landing ground for No. 9 (Pilots) Advanced Flying Unit RAF (September 1944 – July 1945)

=== Post War ===
After the war it became an aircraft graveyard when many hundreds of surplus Fleet Air Arm aircraft were broken up. The work reached its peak in 1946/7, but even as late as February 1952 their many airframes could still be seen in various stages of dismemberment. The most numerous were North American Harvards but there were also Fairey Fulmars, Fairey Fireflies, Miles Martinets, Fairey Barracudas, Beech Expeditors and a rare Fairchild Cornell FT673. Three Expeditors were all that remained in 1955. It was also used from 1946 for light aircraft and gliding until its final closure in 1957.

== Later use ==
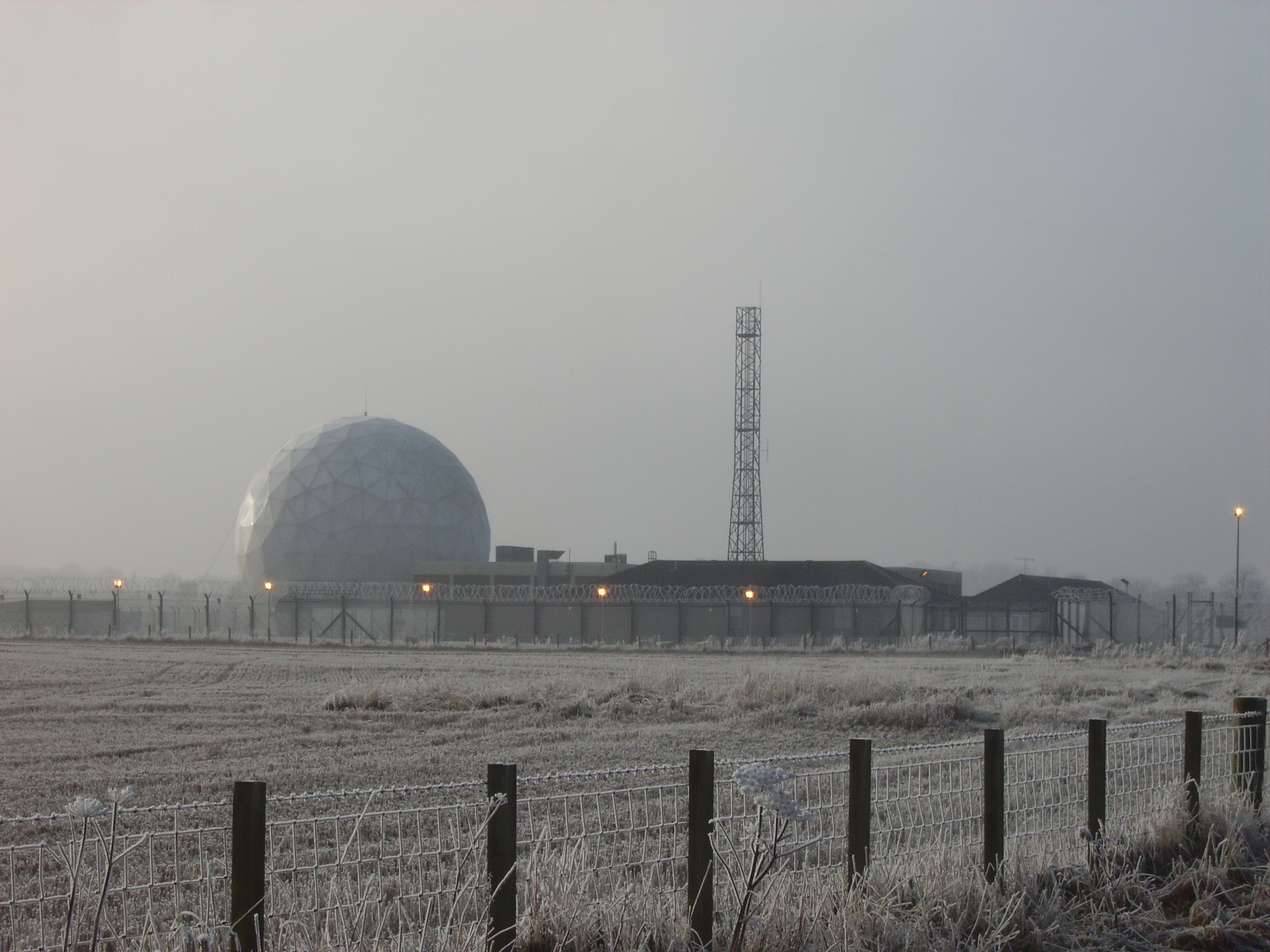
Balado Satellite Ground Station in January 2006

Following decommissioning as an RAF station, part of the site served as a NATO communication satellite groundstation, which operated from 1985 to 2006. From 1997 to 2014 Balado was the home of the annual T in the Park music festival, however, due to safety concerns about an oil pipeline lying directly underneath parts of the airfield the festival was moved to Strathallan Castle in 2015. There are a number of poultry farm buildings on parts of the old runways. The remaining section of the airfield, including the control tower, is used as a base for microlight flying.
