= Eshott Airfield =

Airfield in Northumberland, England

Eshott Airfield RAF Eshott (1942–1944)
- IATA: none; ICAO: none

Summary
- Airport type: Public
- Owner/Operator: Eshott Airfield Ltd.
- Location: Felton, Northumberland
- Elevation AMSL: 197 ft / 60 m
- Coordinates: 55°16′45″N 01°43′15″W
- Website: www.eshottairfield.com

Map
- Location in Northumberland

Runways
Direction	Length		Surface
Direction	m	ft	Surface
01/19	610	2,001	Asphalt
01/19	550	1,804	Grass
07/25	550	1,804	Asphalt

Eshott Airfield is a general aviation airfield in the civil parish of Thirston, in the county of Northumberland, England, 20 miles (32 km) north of Newcastle, and midway between Morpeth and Alnwick. It is a former Second World War Royal Air Force (RAF) station and is also known as Bockenfield Aerodrome.

== Second World War ==
From 10 November 1942 Eshott was home to No. 57 Operational Training Unit RAF. Training on Supermarine Spitfires was carried out there along with a satellite airfield at RAF Boulmer between March 1943 and June 1945, until the unit was disbanded on 6 June 1945.

The following units were also here at some point:

- No. 289 Squadron RAF between 18 May and 5 June 1945
- No. 291 Squadron RAF detachment from 1943 to 1945
- No. 2777 Squadron RAF Regiment
- No. 2803 Squadron RAF Regiment

== Current use ==
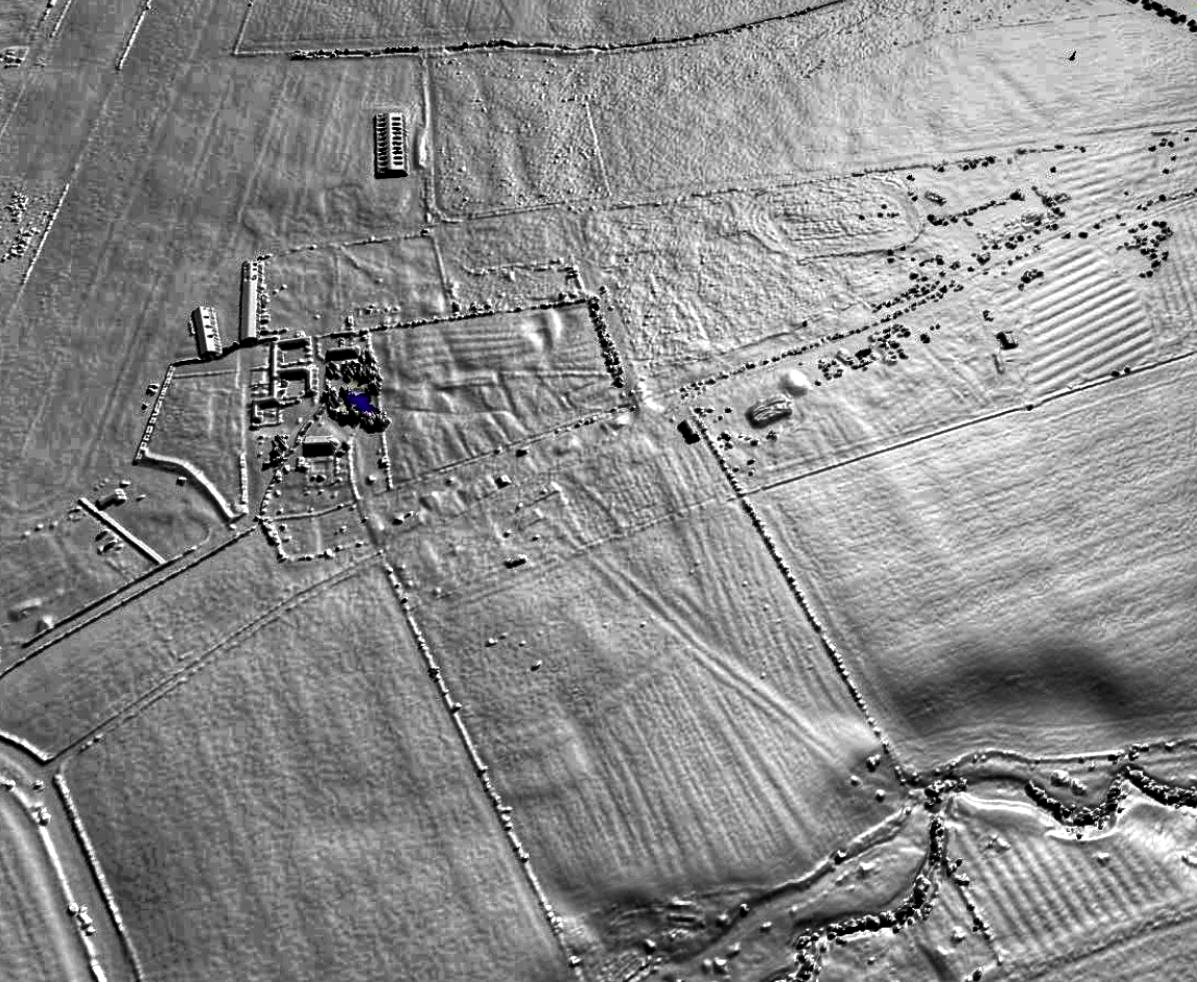
A lidar view of Bockenfield deserted Medieval settlement at Eshott Airfield

Eshott, now a civil general aviation field, is used by light aircraft and microlights. It has both tarmac and grass runways.

The airfield is home to more than 40 aircraft and has a clubhouse, parking, and three hangar blocks.
