= No. 53 Operational Training Unit RAF =

Operational Training Unit of the Royal Air Force

No. 53 Operational Training Unit

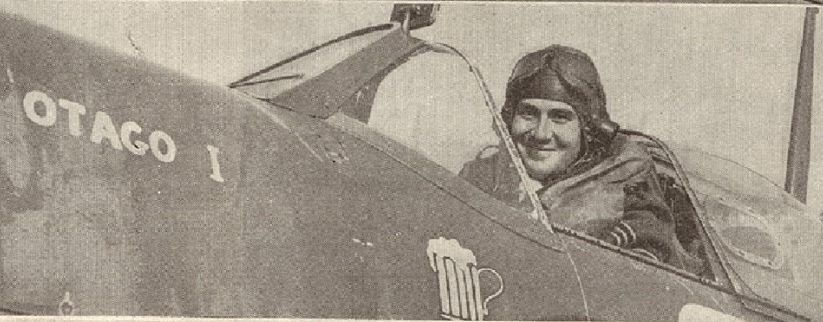
- 55 Sgt. W.M. Krebs photographed in the cockpit of Spitfire Mk 1A P9375 in 53 OTU RAF, Heston
- Active: 1941 – 1945
- Country: United Kingdom
- Branch: Royal Air Force
- Type: Operational Training Unit
- Role: Pilot Training
- Nickname(s): 53 OTU
- Engagements: World War Two

Aircraft flown
- Fighter: Supermarine Spitfire

No. 53 Operational Training Unit RAF was an Operational Training Unit of the Royal Air Force, formed in 1941 to train Spitfire pilots, and disbanded in 1945.

== History ==
53 OTU RAF was an Operational Training Unit of the Royal Air Force. It was formed at RAF Heston in February 1941 to train Spitfire pilots for Fighter Command. In July 1941 it moved to RAF Llandow in Wales, and in May 1943 to RAF Kirton-in-Lindsey in Lincolnshire. Pilots trained initially on Miles Master aircraft and later on Spitfires.

Had a German invasion of England taken place, 53 OTU RAF would have become No's 553 and 554 Squadron, operating from RAF Church Fenton.

When WW2 ended in Europe, No 53 OTU was disbanded at Kirton-in-Lindsey on 15 May 1945.

== Commanding Officers ==
- March 1943 Wing Commander P H Hamley
- 18 May 1943 Group Captain G C Tomlinson
- 24 November 1943 Group Captain J G Hawtrey
- 18 January 1945 Group Captain M H Rhys

== See also ==
- List of Royal Air Force Operational Training Units
