= Kemble, Gloucestershire =

Village in the Cotswolds of England

Coordinates: 51°41′N 2°01′W

Kemble
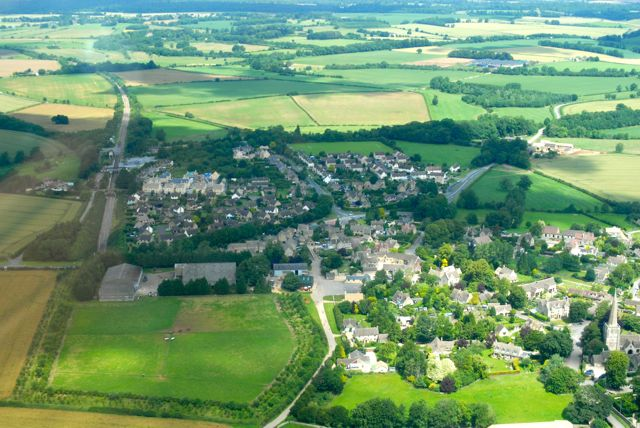
- Kemble from above

- Location within Gloucestershire
- Area: 0.4050 km^{2} (0.1564 sq mi)
- Population: 940 (2020 estimate)
  - Density: 2,321/km^{2} (6,010/sq mi)
- OS grid reference: ST987973
- Civil parish: Kemble and Ewen
- District: Cotswold
- Shire county: Gloucestershire
- Region: South West
- Country: England
- Sovereign state: United Kingdom
- Post town: CIRENCESTER
- Postcode district: GL7
- Dialling code: 01285
- Police: Gloucestershire
- Fire: Gloucestershire
- Ambulance: South Western
- UK Parliament: South Cotswolds

Kemble is a village in the civil parish of Kemble and Ewen, in the Cotswold district of Gloucestershire, England. Historically part of Wiltshire, it lies 4 miles (6.4 km) from Cirencester and is the settlement closest to Thames Head, the source of the River Thames. In 2020 it had an estimated population of 940. At the 2011 census the parish had a population of 1,036.

== Governance ==
The village lies in Kemble electoral ward of Cotswold District Council, which stretches from Somerford Keynes to the south-east over to Rodmarton in the north-west. The ward population recorded in the 2011 census was 1,955.

== Church and history ==
Kemble was the site of a 7th-century pagan, Anglo-Saxon cemetery. The village church today, All Saints Church, has a Norman door and a tower dating from 1250, to which a spire was added in 1450. The full restoration in 1872 included bringing here brick by brick the chapel of ease at nearby Ewen, to form a new south transept.

Kemble Church is part of the Thameshead benefice, covering the congregations of Kemble, Ewen, Poole Keynes, Somerford Keynes, and Shorncote. The benefice since 2001 also includes Coates, Rodmarton, Sapperton, Tarlton and Frampton Mansell.

In June 2026, All Saints Church was the venue for the wedding of Harriet Sperling and Peter Phillips, son of Anne, Princess Royal.

== Air facilities ==
Cotswold Airport (previously known as Kemble Airport) on the edge of the village hosted the RAF Red Arrows aerobatic display team from 1966 until 1983. After the Red Arrows moved to RAF Scampton, the station was used by the US Air Force as a maintenance facility.

The airfield today is used by light industry, flying clubs and private aircraft owners, for events including two annual air displays, and for scrapping and storage of airliners. The firm Delta Jets rebuilds, maintains and flies historic jet aircraft, particularly Hawker Hunters. The Bristol Aero collection had a museum at the airfield until 31 May 2012.

Aston Down airfield, 3 miles (4.8 km) to the north-west, formerly belonged to the RAF but is now used for gliding by the Cotswold Gliding Club.

== Amenities ==
Kemble railway station is on the Golden Valley Line, served by eastbound Great Western Railway trains to Swindon and London Paddington, and westbound services to Gloucester and Cheltenham Spa. Kemble was once a railway junction. The branch lines from Cirencester and Tetbury were dismantled in the 1960s.

Kemble Primary School has about 100 pupils. The pub, The Tavern, is next to the station. The village also has a combined post office and local store.

== Possible new town ==
In May 2024, it was reported that Conservative led Gloucestershire County Council had drawn up plans for a potential new town with 23,000 homes, linking Kemble and Cirencester. These plans were opposed by Liberal Democrat led Cotswold District council. As of January 2025, no progress has been made on these plans.

== See also ==
- All Saints Church, Shorncote
