= Ground Force (Bristol) =

Mixed-use development under construction in Bristol, England

Artist's impression of Ground Force

Ground Force is a mixed-use development under construction at Skyline Park, an industrial estate in Brislington, Bristol, England, built around a Boeing 727 fuselage to be mounted on shipping containers. The estate is owned by Johnny Palmer, who had earlier installed a separate Boeing 727 on the same site.

== Background ==
Palmer moved the first Boeing 727 from Cotswold Airport at Kemble to Skyline Park by road in February 2021. In February 2025 Bristol Live reported that he intended to install a second aircraft on top of community buildings on the estate, and that he would hold a public engagement day at the site on 5 April 2025 to gather local views and ideas. The newspaper quoted Palmer as saying the plan was for co-working space, a café, a community sauna or spa, a community meeting place and some accommodation.

== Planning ==
In July 2025 Skyline Park's owner, Johnny Palmer, applied to Bristol City Council to install a second Boeing 727 fuselage on the equivalent of three storeys of containers, in addition to a Boeing 727 installation already on the estate. Palmer said he wanted to create a "placemaking landmark"; he told planners that the structure would provide co-working and office space, a coffee shop and public amenities, and said that the development would create 34 jobs. Bristol Live reported that early comments logged shortly after the application was submitted were 11 in favour to 3 against. By 21 August 2025 the application had received 70 letters of support and nine objections. The council granted planning permission in October 2025 after the application had received 77 letters of support and 15 objections; the decision was reported in early November 2025. The approved scheme comprises a café, co-working space, office, wellness facility, first-class lounge and the aircraft, which is to be available for events, filming and private hire. The wellness facility includes a sauna branded "Sky Sauna", which Palmer described as a community sauna that would be the highest in the South West. The council's planners judged that the development was far enough from residential property not to be overbearing.

== Design ==
TheBusinessDesk.com reported in November 2026 that the building would have a public café on the ground floor with phone and e-bike charging, a drinking-water fountain and a public toilet; meeting and office space on the first floor; and the Aether Sauna "Sky Spa" and a rebuilt Boeing 747 first-class cabin on the second floor, with the 727 fuselage above. The fuselage is to sit on stacked shipping containers roughly three storeys above the estate, higher than the earlier aircraft on the same site.

== Construction ==
Boeing 727-76 2-MMTT at Cotswold Airport, November 2026

In August 2025 Palmer said that, if permission was granted, ground works would start in January 2026 with an official launch in March. In May 2026 Bristol Live reported that foundations for the structure were being laid at a unit on the estate. In August 2026 Insider Media reported, citing a post by Palmer, that the first floor of the structure had been installed. TheBusinessDesk.com reported in November 2026 that the first floor of containers had been installed during the summer.

=== Events licence ===
On 30 April 2026 a Bristol City Council licensing sub-committee granted a premises licence for Skyline Park permitting up to four large events a year with a capacity of 1,500 people including staff. The licence was granted for one year, after which the operators would assess the impact before any application for a permanent licence.

== Aircraft ==
Interior of the Boeing 727-76 formerly registered 2-MMTT, November 2026

The aircraft bought by Palmer for the development is a Boeing 727-76 formerly registered 2-MMTT, which was reported as purchased in early November 2026. The "2-" is part of the registration; only one aircraft was bought. It first flew in July 1966, was originally delivered to an Australian domestic airline, and later served as a corporate aircraft for Occidental Petroleum before passing through several private owners. It made its final flight to Cotswold Airport at Kemble in December 2018 and has since been stored there by Air Salvage International. The aircraft is expected to be moved to Bristol by road, but no date had been confirmed as of November 2026.

== Criticism ==
Some neighbours objected to the planning application on grounds including noise, citing parties held at the estate's existing, separate aircraft installation. Objectors also described the proposal as a "vanity project" or a "publicity stunt", and one called the existing aircraft an "absolute eyesore". The council's planning officers noted the objections about noise but concluded that, as an office use within an established industrial estate, the additional uses would not be considered to cause increased noise pollution. Palmer said that noise had not been directly attributed to the existing fuselage and that other events and venues in the area made noise, and that he had submitted a formal response to each objection. In May 2026 Palmer rejected criticism that the project was little more than a stunt, saying his aim was to "create something memorable, commercially successful and culturally important". When the events licence for Skyline Park was considered in April 2026, a local resident and a local councillor warned that the events would cause noise nuisance, including from people leaving; the committee said it could consider only the licence application and not personal concerns about Palmer.
