= St Mary & St Giles Church, Stony Stratford =

St Mary and St Giles' Church, Stony Stratford
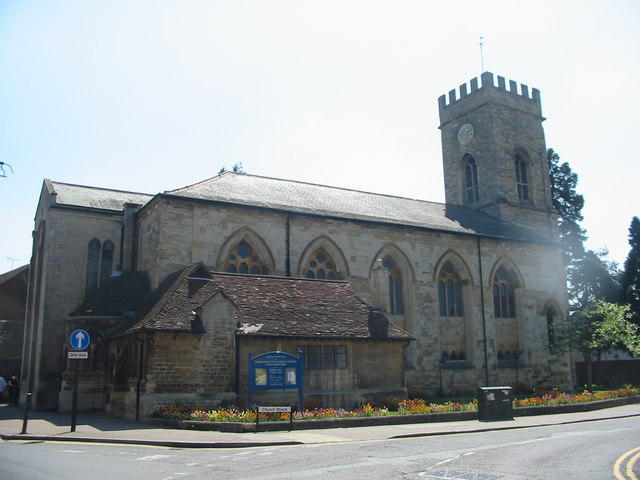
- St Mary and St Giles Church of England Church
- St Mary and St Giles' Church, Stony Stratford
- 52°3′25.2″N 0°51′12.9″W
- OS grid reference: SP 78702 40464
- Location: Stony Stratford, Milton Keynes, Buckinghamshire
- Country: England
- Denomination: Church of England
- Churchmanship: Anglo-Catholic
- Website: parishstonystratfordcalverton.com/st-mary-st-giles

History
- Dedication: St Mary the Virgin and St Giles

Architecture
- Heritage designation: Grade II* listed
- Architect: Francis Hiorne
- Completed: 1776

Administration
- Diocese: Oxford
- Archdeaconry: Buckingham
- Deanery: Milton Keynes
- Parish: Stony Stratford with Calverton

St Mary & St Giles Church is a parish church in Stony Stratford, in Milton Keynes (in north Buckinghamshire), England. It is a Grade II* listed building.

== History ==
The present parish church is dedicated to Saint Mary the Virgin & St Giles, the latter being the patron saint of cripples. Saint Giles was born at Athens in 645; he was a cripple, and though he had the means of obtaining all the comforts he wished, he would not, but devoted his life and his means in endeavouring to ameliorate the sufferings of the afflicted. Most churches dedicated to his name, are erected by the road side, the supposition for such being, that all weary travellers could enter and find rest and peace. Devotion to him was brought to the British Isles as he founded the abbey in Saint-Gilles-du-Gard whose tomb became a place of pilgrimage and which was on the Crusader route to the Holy Land. It was also a stop on the road that led from Arles to Santiago de Compostela, the pilgrim Way of St. James. Giles is one of the Fourteen Holy Helpers.

=== Present day ===
The parish stands in the Anglo-Catholic tradition of the Church of England. Until 2024, the parochial church council (PCC) had passed resolutions to reject the ordination of women and was under the alternative episcopal oversight of the Bishop of Ebbsfleet and then the Bishop of Oswestry, the provincial episcopal visitors for traditionalist Anglo-Catholics. On 12 March 2024, the PCC rescinded the resolution, therefore returning to the oversight of the Bishop of Oxford, and leaving The Society and Forward in Faith.

== Architecture and fittings ==
The tower is an embattled specimen in the Perpendicular style and contains a clock, and a peal of six bells. The height of the tower from the battlements to the ground is 80 feet. In the year 1757 the chancel, or at least the east end of it, was found to be so very ruinous that it was necessary to be taken down, and being reduced a little in size, was rebuilt by Mr. Irons, of Warwick, and several years later, circa 1776, the church was rebuilt by Francis Hiorne, with the exception of the tower, which is the only part standing of the original structure.

The building was reseated in 1866. It is a lofty building, and consists of a nave, two side aisles, a chancel, and galleries on either side. The beauty of the church is principally constituted in the plastered groined ceiling, which is supported by eight clustered columns of iron, cased in wood.

In 1892, the old vestry at the west end, the basement of the tower, being found inadequate, two new vestries were built, adjoining the north side of the chancel. They were designed by E. Swinfen Harris, the contractors being Mansfield and Buttrum, of Stony Stratford. The vestries were opened in 1892 by the bishop of Reading.

The vestries are English Gothic of the 13th century, the clergy vestry being apsidal on plan, and the choir vestry covers the remainder of the available space. The partition separating the old vestry from the church, was subsequently taken away, and the space now forms a baptistry. There are tablets at each corner of the church, all placed very high. The large oval one over the organ is very much worn, and the inscription nearly obliterated; it is to the memory of Leonard Sedgewick, a former vicar.

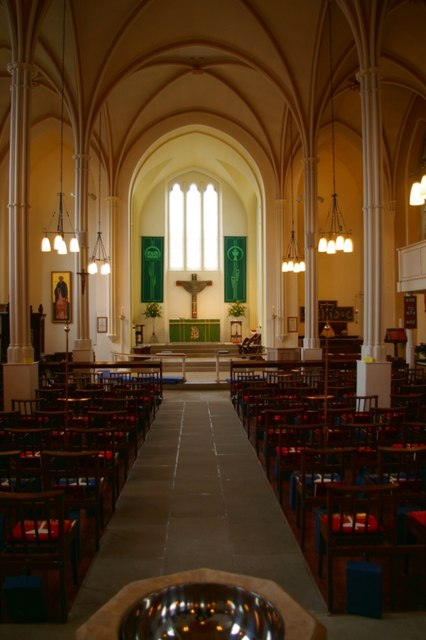
Interior view

The east window is a beautiful specimen of its kind, and contains representations of the 12 apostles with their names inscribed beneath. This was erected to the memory of the Rev. W. T. Sankey, who died in 1875, by his widow and son. There are two other large stained windows, the one on the north side . The large window on the south side is to the memory of Josiah Michael and Ann Smith. There are six small stained windows under the galleries, dedicated to former people, notably two to the memory of the late Rev. J. Spark, a former curate. It was this gentleman who devised by his will ^50 towards providing better vestry accommodation, and this money formed the nucleus of a fund for building the new vestries, before alluded to. Near the vestry door is an oil painting in a gilt frame, over which is a gilt dove, and the following inscription is appended to the frame : "This painting, illustrating the epistle for Quinquagesima Sunday, with the gilded dove which surmounted the pulpit in this church in the 18th and earlier part of the 19th century, and here placed by William Osborn Boyes, who died 25th May, 1896, and for many years churchwarden of this parish."

The church is a Grade II* listed building.

== Organ ==
The first record of an organ in the church is from 1812 when an instrument by Henry Lincoln was installed. This was later modified by Stringer around 1890 and Kirkland in 1902.

Following a small fire and destruction of the previous organ, the present organ arrived in 1967 when it was installed by Starmer Shaw of Northampton. This instrument is originally by ‘Father’ Henry Willis with additional pipe work and a new three manual console provided by Henry Willis III. It was restored in stages with restoration completed in 2016, and is currently in the care of Harrison & Harrison who hold the tuning and maintenance contract. This instrument previously stood in St George's Church, Edinburgh, until that church's closure. A specification can be found on the National Pipe Organ Register.
