= Church of St Mary the Virgin, Tetbury =

Church in Gloucestershire, England

Coordinates: 51.6368°N 2.1594°W

Church of St Mary the Virgin
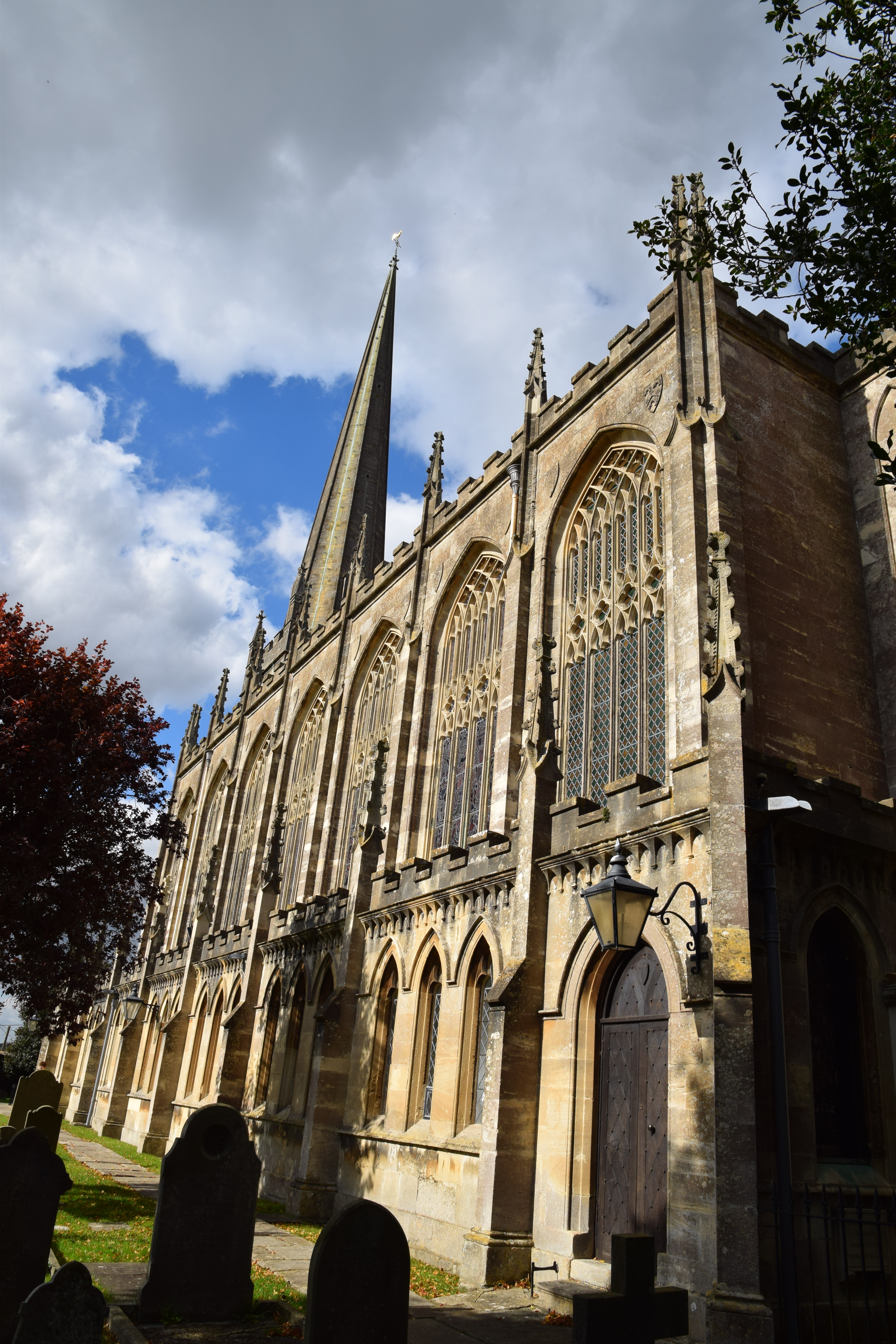

- Denomination: Church of England
- Website: tetburychurch.co.uk

Architecture
- Heritage designation: Grade I listed building
- Designated: 21 March 1985

Administration
- Province: Canterbury
- Diocese: Gloucester

The Church of St Mary the Virgin is the parish church of Tetbury in the Cotswold District of Gloucestershire, England. It was built in 1781 incorporating elements of an earlier church. It is a grade I listed building.

== History ==
The site of a church since the 7th century, and may have been the site of a Saxon monastery. The current building was designed by Francis Hiorne and opened in 1781 replacing a medieval structure which was demolished in 1777. The building cost was £5,059. 12s. 0d.

The 14th-century tower and spire of the previous building were retained until it was rebuilt in 1891 using the same stones.

== Architecture ==
The Gothic Revival stone building has a hipped slate and Cotswold stone roof with an embattled parapet. It is a seven-bay hall church with nave, chancel and aisles.

The tower is 57 metres (187 ft) high and is wrongly believed to be the fourth highest in the country. It contains a ring of eight bells most of which were cast in 1722 and all were made by Rudhall of Gloucester.

The church has some box pews which are accessed from a passageway around the church rather than the central aisle. Stained glass includes work by Clayton and Bell and William Wailes. Two large chandeliers dating from 1781 hang above the nave.

Within the church is a roll of honour commemorating those from the parish who served in World War I. There are some effigies in the north aisle passage which were transferred from the earlier building.
