= No. 187 Squadron RAF =

Defunct flying squadron of the Royal Air Force

- Active: 1 April 1918–1919; 1 February 1945 – 1 Dec 1946; 1 February 1953 – 2 Sept 1957
- Country: United Kingdom
- Branch: Royal Air Force
- Motto: Versatile

Insignia
- Squadron Badge: A buzzard carrying a propeller in its claws
- Squadron codes: PU (Feb 1945 – Dec 1946)

No. 187 Squadron RAF was a Royal Air Force Squadron that was a transport unit towards the end of World War II.

== History ==
=== Formation in World War I ===
The squadron formed on 1 April 1918 as a night training unit and disbanded in 1919 without acquiring its own aircraft.

=== Formation in World War II ===
The squadron reformed on 1 February 1945 at RAF Merryfield and equipped with Halifax transport aircraft. It then equipped with Dakotas for trooping flights to India and then destinations in Europe including Bari, Italy. The squadron disbanded in Austria on 1 November 1946 upon renumbering as No. 53 Squadron RAF.

=== Postwar period ===
On 7 February 1952 No. 2 Home Ferry Unit was established at Aston Down. On 1 February 1953 the unit was renamed No. 187 Squadron.

The squadron ferried aircraft in the UK and to Germany before it was finally disbanded on 2 September 1957.

== Aircraft operated ==
Aircraft operated by No. 187 Squadron RAF
From	To	Aircraft	Variant
Feb 1945	Mar 1945	Handley Page Halifax	III
Mar 1945	Oct 1946	Douglas Dakota	II
Feb 1953	Sep 1957	Avro Anson	C.19
Mar 1955	Sep 1957	Vickers Varsity	T.1
Apr 1955	Sep 1957	Avro Anson	C.12
