= The Church House, Tetbury =

Building in Tetbury, Gloucestershire, England

Coordinates: 51°38′13″N 2°9′35″W

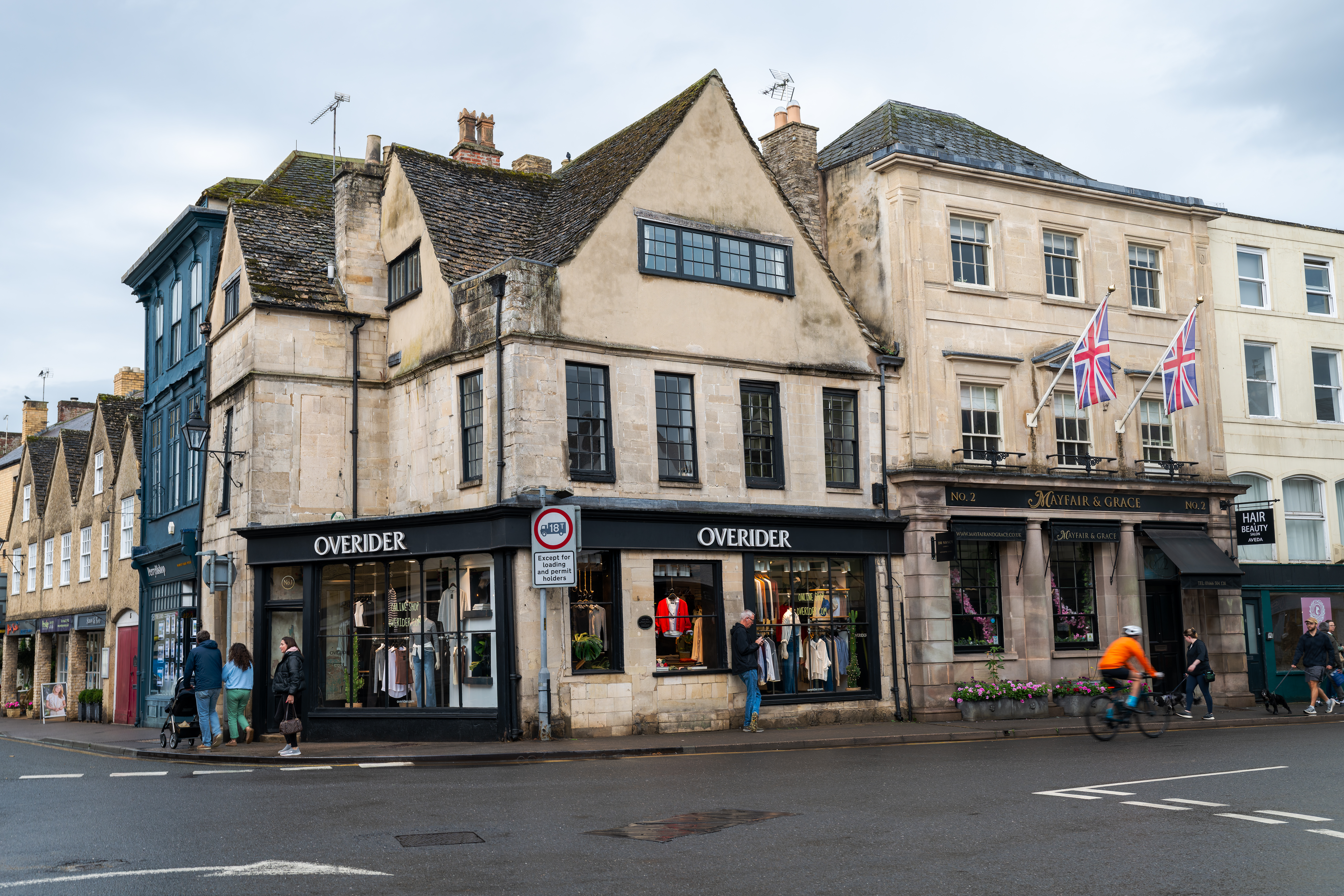
The house and the corner where it is located

The Church House, No.1 Church Street, Tetbury, Gloucestershire, England, is a prominent Grade II listed building located on the corner of Church Street and Long Street. It is noted for its range of large handsome windows, porch and shop fronts to both Church Street and Long Street. Both gables have a range of windows indicating its possible former use as a weaver's workshop.

== History ==
The property, once owned by the Feoffees, was often used as a venue for fund raising. One of these was very popular and was known as 'Church Ales', when a barrel or two of weak ale was provided and sold off at a party to raise money for a worthy cause.

Around 1752 the property was sold for £250 to help pay for the rebuilding of the Parish Church of St Mary's. This came about apparently because the tenant at the time forgot to take up his option to renew the lease and occupation on the appropriate day and the Church snatched the opportunity to raise more money. The parish retained the right to hold 'Church Ales' on the ground floor of the building.

During recent redevelopment of the cellar ancient, probably medieval, remains were uncovered. The shop is now used as a clothes and fashion retail outlet.
