= Tetbury =

Town in Gloucestershire, England

Coordinates: 51.636°N 2.158°W

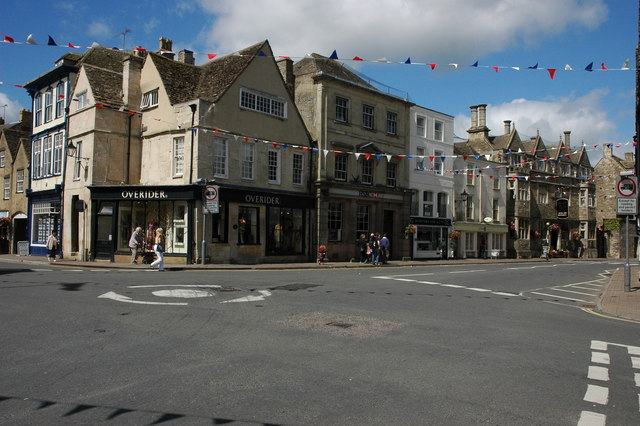

- Location within Gloucestershire
- Population: 6,453 (2021 Census)
- OS grid reference: ST890930
- Civil parish: Tetbury
- District: Cotswold
- Shire county: Gloucestershire
- Region: South West
- Country: England
- Sovereign state: United Kingdom
- Post town: TETBURY
- Postcode district: GL8
- Dialling code: 01666
- Police: Gloucestershire
- Fire: Gloucestershire
- Ambulance: South Western
- UK Parliament: South Cotswolds

Tetbury is a town and civil parish in the Cotswold district of Gloucestershire, England. It lies on the site of an ancient hill fort, on which an Anglo-Saxon monastery was founded in 681, probably by Ine of Wessex. The population of the parish was 5,250 in the 2001 census, increasing to 5,472 by 2011 and 6,453 in 2021.

== History ==
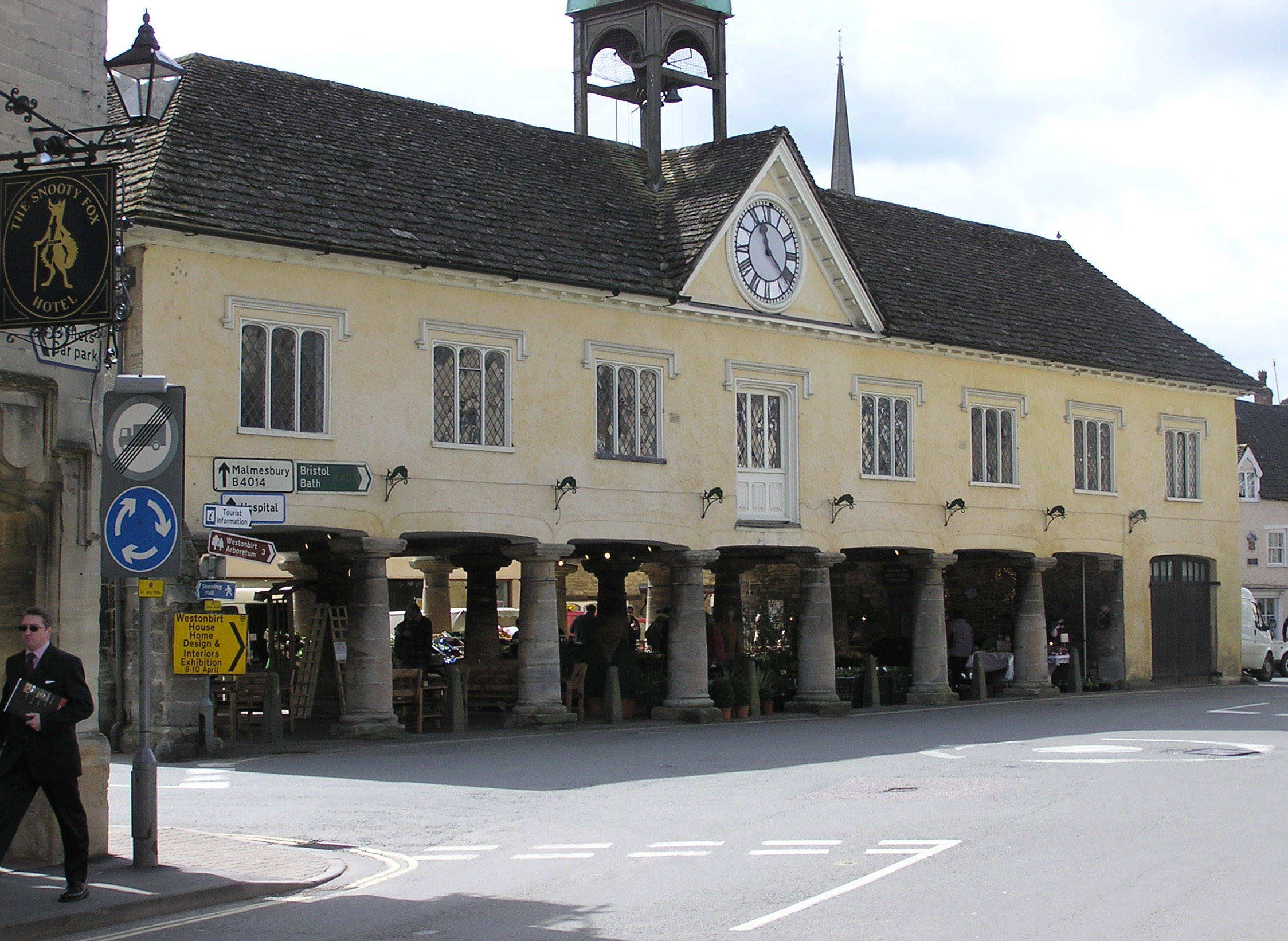
The 17th-century Tetbury Market House

The town's name derives from the Old English tetteburh meaning 'Tette's burh' (fortification). (Note: Select 'Tetbury, Gloucestershire'.)

During the Middle Ages, Tetbury became an important market for Cotswold wool and yarn. Notable buildings in the town include the Church House and the late 18th century Gothic revival parish church of St Mary the Virgin and St Mary Magdalene and much of the rest of the town centre, dates from the 16th and 17th centuries. The Market House, dating from 1655, with restorations done in 1817, is a fine example of a Cotswold pillared market house that used to trade wool and yarn; (Note: This was the main source of the town's wealth.) it is still in use as a meeting place and market. Other attractions include the Tetbury Police Museum and Courtroom, Chavenage House, Highgrove House and Westonbirt Arboretum lie just outside the town.

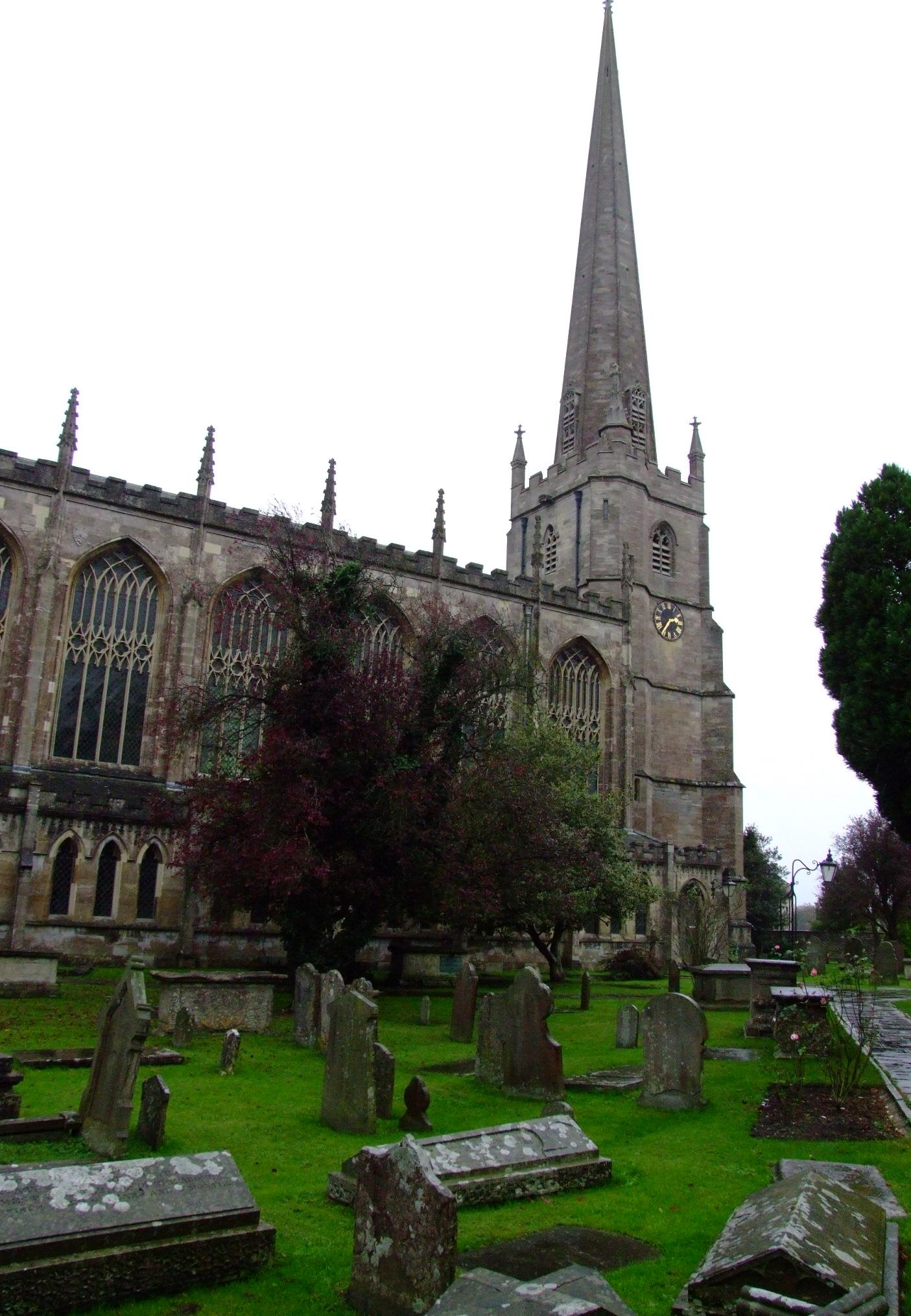
The 18th-century parish church of St Mary the Virgin, with its late 19th-century steeple

The Tetbury Woolsack Races, founded in 1972, is an annual competition where participants must carry a 60-pound (27 kg) sack of wool up and down a steep hill (Gumstool Hill); they take place annually on the Spring Bank Holiday in late May.

== Geography ==
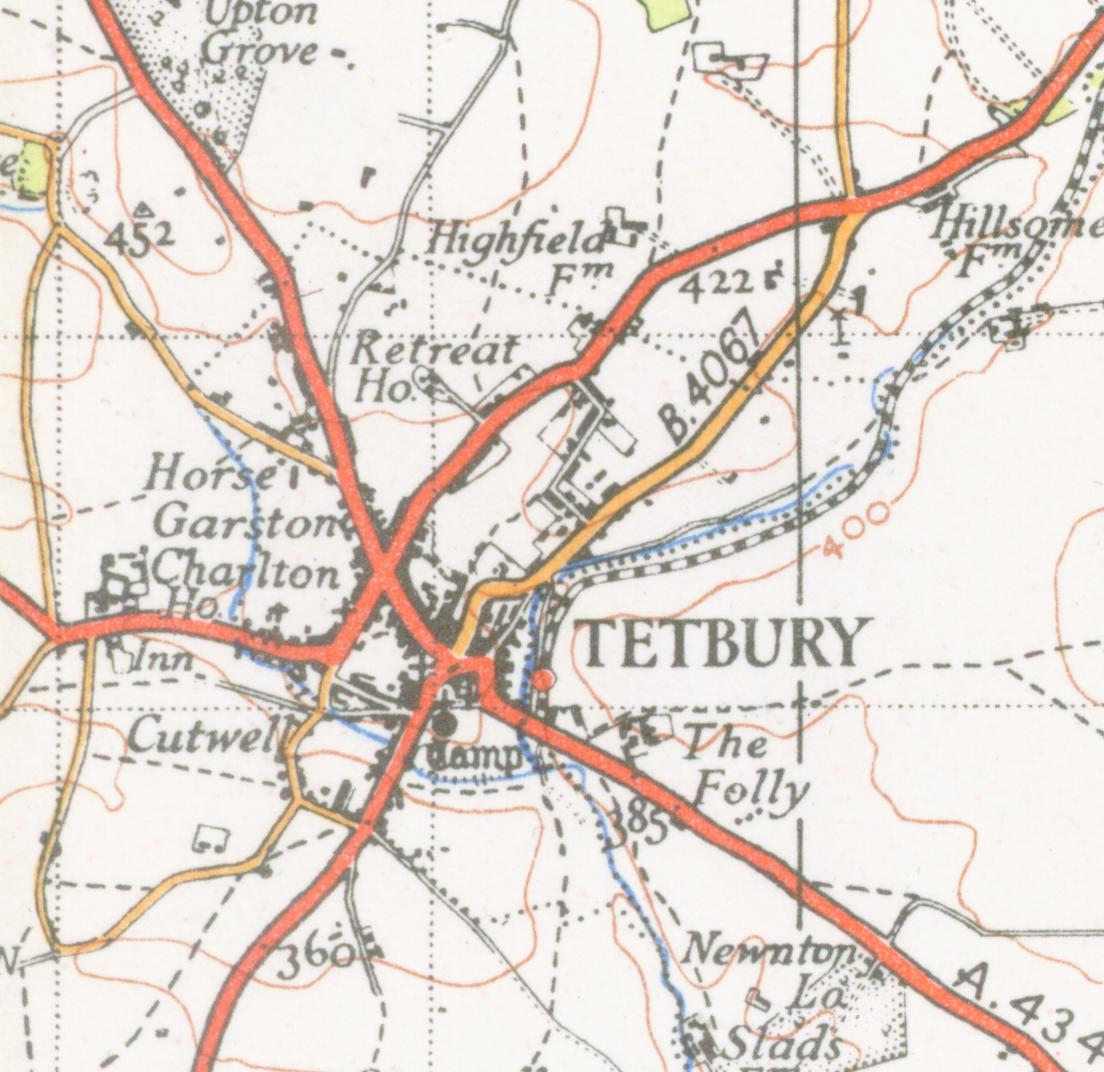
A map of Tetbury from 1946

Tetbury is situated in a landscape of gently rolling hills primarily used for farmland, including grazing of sheep and grain production. Its location is associated with a nearby major east–west trade or drovers trail, which would account for its early importance as a wool trade centre. Nearby to the west are Owlpen Manor, Beverston Castle and Calcot Manor. The Tetbury Avon, a tributary of the Bristol Avon, known locally as the Ingleburn rises to the north of the town.

== Governance ==
Most of Tetbury falls in the Tetbury parish, although some of the northern parts of the town are officially in Tetbury Upton.

Tetbury is in the Cotswold district, and amenities are run by Cotswold District Council. Gloucestershire County Council is also responsible for some services in the town.

Nationally, Tetbury was part of the Cotswold constituency from 1997 to 2024. Since then, it forms a part of the new South Cotswolds constituency, represented in Parliament by the Liberal Democrat Roz Savage.

== Economy ==
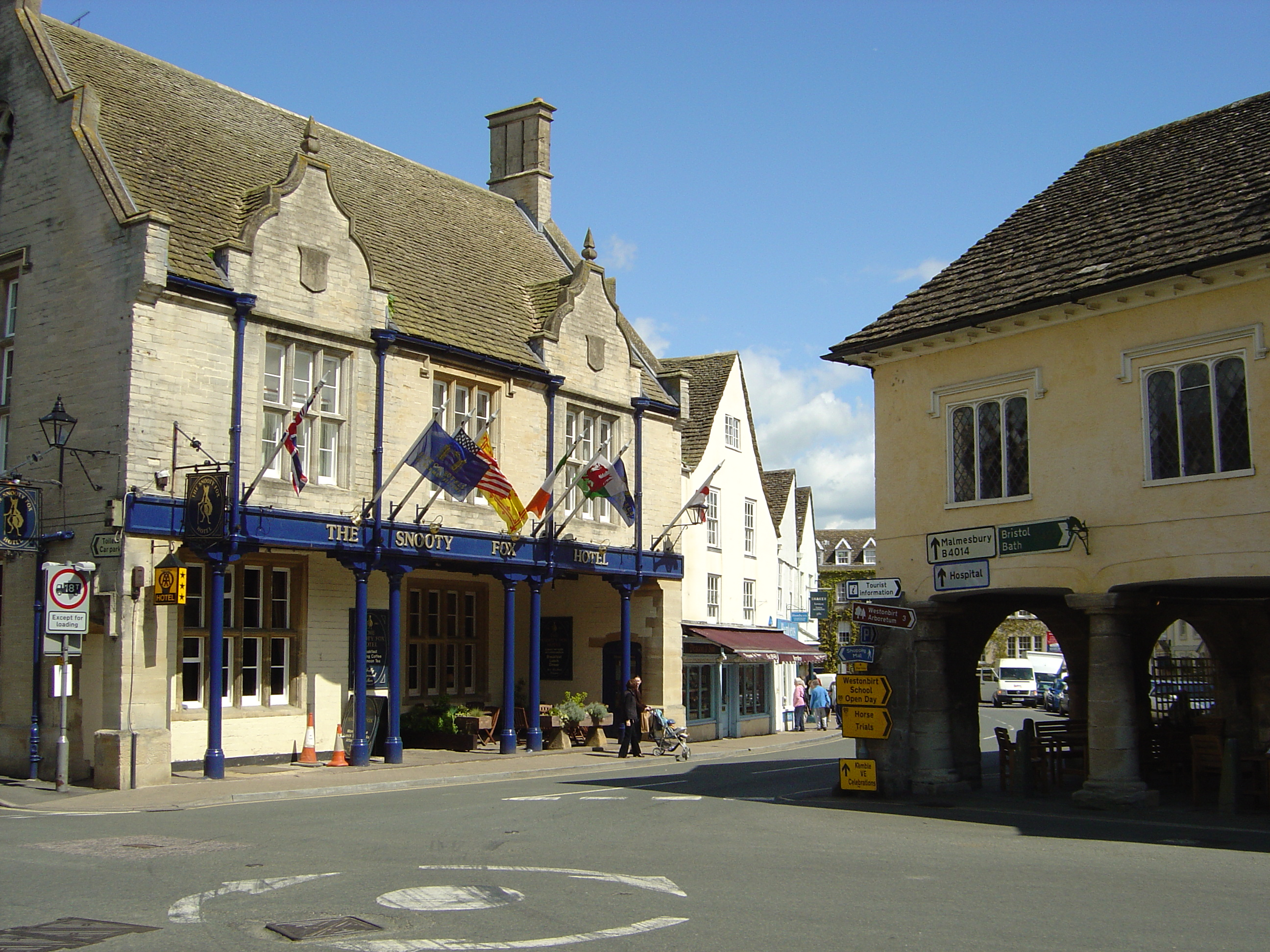
The town centre

Tetbury is renowned for its antique and bric-à-brac shops; Homes & Antiques magazine named Long Street one of the UK's top ten favourite streets for shopping in December 2018. The town centre also has a number of independent specialist food and clothing shops, banks, charity shops, and estate agents; other shops include the King's original Highgrove Shop, which opened in 2008.

A Tesco supermarket was opened just outside of the town centre in July 2002. The high street is the home to a number of specialist shops selling cheese, breads and meats.

The town has pubs and hotels, including the Royal Oak Inn which was featured in the 1971 film Dulcima and in an episode of BBC One's Bonekickers. The Trouble House Inn, which lies immediately outside the town, was served by Trouble House Halt between 1959 and 1964 on the former railway route from Kemble.

== Healthcare ==
Tetbury Hospital is a privately-run facility which funds itself from government funding and charitable donations. The hospital, which homes a Minor Injuries Unit, was rated as "needing improvement" by the Care Quality Commission in 2016.

The nearest Accident and Emergency Department is in Cirencester.

== Education ==
The town has three schools:

- St Mary's Primary School
- Sir William Romney's School, a secondary school which specialises in creative arts
- Westonbirt School is an independent school for girls aged 11 to 18.

Some Tetbury children travel further afield, with students at the two grammar schools, Marling School for boys and Stroud High School for girls, both in Stroud, with some at the Deer Park comprehensive school in Cirencester.

== Transport ==
Stagecoach West operates bus services to Bath, Cirencester, Gloucester and Stroud.

Tetbury railway station closed in 1964; the nearest is now at Kemble. Great Western Railway operates services between London Paddington, Gloucester and Cheltenham Spa.

The nearest passenger airport is Bristol Airport; general aviation uses Kemble Airport. The former airfield at Long Newnton, 1 mile (1.6 km) south-east of Tetbury, was home to the Cotswold Gliding Club from 1964 to 1967 when it moved to nearby Aston Down.

The town is on the A433, with easy access to the M4 and M5 motorways. The A4135 originates in Tetbury and proceeds westerly through Beverston.

== Culture ==
Events in the town include:

- Woolsack Day, which is held annually on the Spring Bank Holiday in late May, is famous for the races and street fair
- The Tetbury Fiesta flower show has been held at the recreation ground since 2008
- Tetbury Music Festival is held in early October
- Tetfest, another family music festival, is held in the town during July. It draws fun-goers from all around, sometimes with crowds of over 4,000 visiting the event.

Tetbury has won five consecutive annual Gold awards in the Regional Heart of England in Bloom competition in 2006-10; it was Best Small Town in 2008-10. In 2010, Tetbury was Overall Winner of Heart of England in Bloom and won a judge's discretionary award for community achievement. Tetbury won Silver Gilt as a first-time entrant in the National Britain in Bloom Campaign in 2009 and a second Silver Gilt in Britain in Bloom in 2011.

== Notable people ==
=== Present ===
- King Charles III has a private residence of Highgrove House at Doughton
- Anne Hooper, journalist, author and counsellor
- Josh Kumra, singer/songwriter
- David Mabberley, professor of botany, writer, and educator
- Jake Meyer, the youngest British person to climb Mount Everest
- Neil Woodford, investment fund manager.

=== Past ===
- Jet Black, drummer and founder member of rock band the Stranglers, died in 2022
- Charlotte Eliza Collins, the noted diarist, married Edward Tenney Bousfield at Tetbury in 1853
- Cecil "Sam" Cook, Gloucestershire cricketer and umpire, died in 1996
- Robert Crowley, stationer, poet and Protestant clergyman in the 16th century
- Rod Keller, Canadian Army major general, died in 1954
- Alice Liddell Hargreaves, inspiration behind Alice in Wonderland
- Esther Lewis, poet, married Robert Clark of Tetbury in 1760 and is buried there; shedied in 1794
- Laurens van der Post, a writer, owned a nearby farm in the 1930s, died in 1996
- Brian Trubshaw, first British test-pilot of Concorde, died in 2001.

== See also ==
- Listed buildings in Tetbury
- St Saviour's Church, Tetbury
