= Listed buildings in Tetbury =

Buildings in Worcester, England

Tetbury is a town and civil parish in Gloucestershire, England. It contains 224 listed buildings that are recorded in the National Heritage List for England. Of these four are grade I, four are grade II* and 216 are grade II.

This list is based on the information retrieved online from Historic England.

== Key ==
Grade	Criteria
I	Buildings that are of exceptional interest
II*	Particularly important buildings of more than special interest
II	Buildings that are of special interest

== Listing ==
Name	Grade	Location	Type	Completed (Note: The date given is the date used by Historic England as significant for the initial building or that of an important part in the structure's description.)	Date designated	Grid ref. (Note: The grid reference is based on the British national grid reference system, sometimes known as OSGB36, used by the Ordnance Survey.) Geo-coordinates	Notes	Entry number (Note: The "List Entry Number" is a unique number assigned to each listed building and scheduled monument by Historic England.)	Image	Wikidata
Bath Bridge	II	Bath Road			21 March 1985	ST8893592876; 51°38′04″N 2°09′41″W		1089689	Upload Photo	Q26382103
The Old Toll House	II	6, Bath Road			2 June 1989	ST8890392784; 51°38′02″N 2°09′42″W		1089575	The Old Toll House More images	Q26381986
20, Bath Road	II	20, Bath Road			21 March 1985	ST8884392675; 51°37′58″N 2°09′45″W		1341244	Upload Photo	Q26625357
15, Charlton Road	II	15, Charlton Road			21 March 1985	ST8870893173; 51°38′14″N 2°09′52″W		1152361	Upload Photo	Q26445291
Summerhouse in Garden at Five Trees	II	Chavenage Lane			21 March 1985	ST8875993655; 51°38′30″N 2°09′50″W		1341182	Upload Photo	Q26625299
Baptist Chapel Behind Number 11 Church Street	II	Church Street			6 September 1954	ST8900493109; 51°38′12″N 2°09′37″W		1089659	Upload Photo	Q26382073
Butt Memorial, Immediately West Of Summers Memorial In Churchyard Of Church Of St Mary	II	Church Street			21 March 1985	ST8904192986; 51°38′08″N 2°09′35″W		1089627	Upload Photo	Q26382039
Chappell Memorial, About 7 Metres North West Door In Churchyard Of Church Of St Mary	II	Church Street			21 March 1985	ST8902292978; 51°38′08″N 2°09′36″W		1089634	Upload Photo	Q26382046
Church of St Mary the Virgin	I	Church Street			21 March 1985	ST8904392959; 51°38′07″N 2°09′35″W		1153076	Church of St Mary the Virgin More images	Q17524648
Cox Memorial, About 11 Metres South West Of North West Gate In Churchyard Of Church Of St Mary	II	Church Street			21 March 1985	ST8901493006; 51°38′09″N 2°09′36″W		1304383	Cox Memorial, About 11 Metres South West Of North West Gate In Churchyard Of Church Of St Mary More images	Q26591367
Former Chapel Building Behind Number 9 Church Street	II	Church Street			6 September 1954	ST8900993118; 51°38′12″N 2°09′37″W		1304711	Upload Photo	Q26591660
Freeman Memorial, About 2 Metres South Of Cox Memorial In Churchyard Of Church Of St Mary	II	Church Street			21 March 1985	ST8901492997; 51°38′08″N 2°09′36″W		1089635	Upload Photo	Q26382047
Goldin Memorial, About 1 Metre To East Of Chappell Memorial In Churchyard Of Church Of St Mary	II	Church Street			21 March 1985	ST8902692975; 51°38′08″N 2°09′36″W		1089636	Upload Photo	Q26382048
Group Of 3 Unidentified Memorials, About 1 Metre West Of North West Path At 10 Metres From Path Crossing In Churchyard Of Church Of St Mary	II	Church Street			21 March 1985	ST8902892991; 51°38′08″N 2°09′36″W		1341197	Group Of 3 Unidentified Memorials, About 1 Metre West Of North West Path At 10 Metres From Path Crossing In Churchyard Of Church Of St Mary More images	Q26625313
Group Of 5 Chest Tombs, About 7 To 12 Metres From North East Corner Of North Aisle In Churchyard Of Church Of St Mary	II	Church Street			21 March 1985	ST8907492969; 51°38′08″N 2°09′33″W		1304411	Group Of 5 Chest Tombs, About 7 To 12 Metres From North East Corner Of North Aisle In Churchyard Of Church Of St Mary More images	Q26591393
Hillier Memorial, About 4 Metres From North East Corner Of Chancel In Churchyard Of Church Of St Mary	II	Church Street			21 March 1985	ST8907292962; 51°38′07″N 2°09′33″W		1341171	Hillier Memorial, About 4 Metres From North East Corner Of Chancel In Churchyard Of Church Of St Mary More images	Q26625288
Holborow Memorial, About 9 Metres From North East Corner Of Chancel In Churchyard Of Church Of St Mary	II	Church Street			21 March 1985	ST8907492963; 51°38′07″N 2°09′33″W		1153113	Holborow Memorial, About 9 Metres From North East Corner Of Chancel In Churchyard Of Church Of St Mary More images	Q26445877
Hooper Memorial, About 6 Metres West Of North West Path At 5 Metres From Path Crossing In Churchyard Of Church Of St Mary	II	Church Street			21 March 1985	ST8902292981; 51°38′08″N 2°09′36″W		1153288	Upload Photo	Q26446038
Ludlow Memorial, About 8 Metres East North West Path At 21 Metres From Path Crossing In Churchyard Of Church Of St Mary	II	Church Street			21 March 1985	ST8903293010; 51°38′09″N 2°09′36″W		1089628	Upload Photo	Q26382040
Pair Of Sealy Memorials, About 3 Metres West Of North West Path At 5 Metres From Path Crossing In Churchyard Of Church Of St Mary	II	Church Street			21 March 1985	ST8903092979; 51°38′08″N 2°09′36″W		1089637	Upload Photo	Q26382050
Pair Of Swinerton Memorials, About 5 Metres West Of North West Path At 14 Metres From Path Crossing In Churchyard Of Church Of St Mary	II	Church Street			21 March 1985	ST8901792995; 51°38′08″N 2°09′36″W		1089638	Upload Photo	Q26382051
Pair Of Unidentified Memorials, Immediately To North Of Paul Memorial In Churchyard Of Church Of St Mary	II	Church Street			21 March 1985	ST8907292946; 51°38′07″N 2°09′33″W		1089668	Pair Of Unidentified Memorials, Immediately To North Of Paul Memorial In Churchyard Of Church Of St Mary More images	Q26382083
Paul Memorial, About 8 Metres South East Of Chancel In Churchyard Of Church Of St Mary	II	Church Street			21 March 1985	ST8907092943; 51°38′07″N 2°09′34″W		1089667	Paul Memorial, About 8 Metres South East Of Chancel In Churchyard Of Church Of St Mary More images	Q26382082
Pike Memorial, About 13 Metres West South West Of North East Gate In Churchyard Of Church Of St Mary	II	Church Street			21 March 1985	ST8905493003; 51°38′09″N 2°09′34″W		1341194	Pike Memorial, About 13 Metres West South West Of North East Gate In Churchyard Of Church Of St Mary More images	Q26625311
Sloper Memorial, About 7 Metres West Of Swinerton Memorials In Churchyard Of Church Of St Mary	II	Church Street			21 March 1985	ST8901092986; 51°38′08″N 2°09′37″W		1153380	Upload Photo	Q26446128
Summers Memorial, About 7 Metres North East Of Path Crossing In Churchyard Of Church Of St Mary	II	Church Street			21 March 1985	ST8904492989; 51°38′08″N 2°09′35″W		1089629	Summers Memorial, About 7 Metres North East Of Path Crossing In Churchyard Of Church Of St Mary More images	Q26382041
The Bartons	II	Church Street			21 March 1985	ST8899092946; 51°38′07″N 2°09′38″W		1341198	The Bartons More images	Q26625314
Thorpe Memorial, About 1 Metres East Of North East Path At 9 Metres From Path Crossing In Churchyard Of Church Of St Mary	II	Church Street			21 March 1985	ST8905092983; 51°38′08″N 2°09′35″W		1089669	Thorpe Memorial, About 1 Metres East Of North East Path At 9 Metres From Path Crossing In Churchyard Of Church Of St Mary More images	Q26382084
Unidentifed Memorial, About 1 Metre North West Of North East Path At 11 Metres From Crossing In Churchyard Of Church Of St Mary	II*	Church Street			21 March 1985	ST8905492994; 51°38′08″N 2°09′34″W		1341195	Unidentifed Memorial, About 1 Metre North West Of North East Path At 11 Metres From Crossing In Churchyard Of Church Of St Mary More images	Q17537010
Unidentifed Memorial, About 2 Metres East Of North West Path At 17 Metres From Path Crossing In Churchyard Of Church Of St Mary	II	Church Street			21 March 1985	ST8903292999; 51°38′08″N 2°09′36″W		1304372	Unidentifed Memorial, About 2 Metres East Of North West Path At 17 Metres From Path Crossing In Churchyard Of Church Of St Mary More images	Q26591356
Unidentifed Memorial, About 3 Metres East Of North West Path At 13 Metres From Path Crossing In Churchyard Of Church Of St Mary	II	Church Street			21 March 1985	ST8903692994; 51°38′08″N 2°09′35″W		1089632	Upload Photo	Q26382044
Unidentifed Memorial, About 5 Metres North East Of Path Crossing In Churchyard Of Church Of St Mary	II	Church Street			21 March 1985	ST8904692987; 51°38′08″N 2°09′35″W		1089631	Unidentifed Memorial, About 5 Metres North East Of Path Crossing In Churchyard Of Church Of St Mary More images	Q26382043
Unidentifed Memorial, About 6 Metres North East Of Path Crossing In Churchyard Of Church Of St Mary	II	Church Street			21 March 1985	ST8904292985; 51°38′08″N 2°09′35″W		1341196	Unidentifed Memorial, About 6 Metres North East Of Path Crossing In Churchyard Of Church Of St Mary More images	Q26625312
Unidentifed Memorial, About 8 Metres South West Of North East Gate In Churchyard Of Church Of St Mary	II	Church Street			21 March 1985	ST8905792995; 51°38′08″N 2°09′34″W		1089630	Unidentifed Memorial, About 8 Metres South West Of North East Gate In Churchyard Of Church Of St Mary More images	Q26382042
Unidentifed Memorial, About 9 Metres East Of North West Path At 20 Metres From Path Crossing In Churchyard Of Church Of St Mary	II	Church Street			21 March 1985	ST8904093005; 51°38′09″N 2°09′35″W		1089633	Upload Photo	Q26382045
Unidentifed Memorial, About 9 Metres East Of North West Path At 21 Metres From Path Crossing In Churchyard Of Church Of St Mary	II	Church Street			21 March 1985	ST8904193009; 51°38′09″N 2°09′35″W		1153264	Unidentifed Memorial, About 9 Metres East Of North West Path At 21 Metres From Path Crossing In Churchyard Of Church Of St Mary More images	Q26446015
Unidentified Memorial, About 1 Metre East Of North East Path At 10 Metres From Path Crossing In Churchyard Of Church Of St Mary	II	Church Street			21 March 1985	ST8905292984; 51°38′08″N 2°09′35″W		1153172	Upload Photo	Q26445930
Unidentified Memorial, About 1 Metre West Of North West Path At 4 Metres From Path Crossing In Churchyard Of Church Of St Mary	II	Church Street			21 March 1985	ST8903692982; 51°38′08″N 2°09′35″W		1089640	Unidentified Memorial, About 1 Metre West Of North West Path At 4 Metres From Path Crossing In Churchyard Of Church Of St Mary More images	Q26382054
Unidentified Memorial, About 1 Metre West Of Path Crossing In Churchyard Of Church Of St Mary	II*	Church Street			21 March 1985	ST8903592981; 51°38′08″N 2°09′35″W		1153413	Unidentified Memorial, About 1 Metre West Of Path Crossing In Churchyard Of Church Of St Mary More images	Q17536413
Unidentified Memorial, About 10 Metres East Of West Gate In Churchyard Of Church Of St Mary	II	Church Street			21 March 1985	ST8901592974; 51°38′08″N 2°09′36″W		1153392	Unidentified Memorial, About 10 Metres East Of West Gate In Churchyard Of Church Of St Mary More images	Q26446140
Unidentified Memorial, About 10 Metres From North East Corner Of Chancel In Churchyard Of Church Of St Mary	II	Church Street			21 March 1985	ST8907892960; 51°38′07″N 2°09′33″W		1341173	Unidentified Memorial, About 10 Metres From North East Corner Of Chancel In Churchyard Of Church Of St Mary More images	Q26625290
Unidentified Memorial, About 10 Metres South Of Bay 5 Of Nave (From West), In Churchyard Of Church Of St Mary	II	Church Street			21 March 1985	ST8902992939; 51°38′07″N 2°09′36″W		1304427	Unidentified Memorial, About 10 Metres South Of Bay 5 Of Nave (From West), In Churchyard Of Church Of St Mary More images	Q26591406
Unidentified Memorial, About 10 Metres West Of North West Door In Churchyard Of Church Of St Mary	II	Church Street			21 March 1985	ST8902692976; 51°38′08″N 2°09′36″W		1089639	Upload Photo	Q26382053
Unidentified Memorial, About 11 Metres From South East Corner Of Chancel In Churchyard Of Church Of St Mary	II	Church Street			21 March 1985	ST8907792948; 51°38′07″N 2°09′33″W		1153165	Unidentified Memorial, About 11 Metres From South East Corner Of Chancel In Churchyard Of Church Of St Mary More images	Q26445923
Unidentified Memorial, About 12 Metres East Of Path Crossing In Churchyard Of Church Of St Mary	II	Church Street			21 March 1985	ST8905892975; 51°38′08″N 2°09′34″W		1089670	Upload Photo	Q26382085
Unidentified Memorial, About 14 Metres South Of North West Gate In Churchyard Of Church Of St Mary	II*	Church Street			21 March 1985	ST8902092995; 51°38′08″N 2°09′36″W		1153440	Unidentified Memorial, About 14 Metres South Of North West Gate In Churchyard Of Church Of St Mary More images	Q17536424
Unidentified Memorial, About 14 Metres West Of Tower In Churchyard Of Church Of St Mary	II	Church Street			21 March 1985	ST8900792968; 51°38′07″N 2°09′37″W		1341172	Upload Photo	Q26625289
Unidentified Memorial, About 2 Metres North Of Bay 2 Of North Aisle (From East) In Churchyard Of Church Of St Mary	II	Church Street			21 March 1985	ST8905492968; 51°38′07″N 2°09′34″W		1304414	Unidentified Memorial, About 2 Metres North Of Bay 2 Of North Aisle (From East) In Churchyard Of Church Of St Mary More images	Q26591396
Unidentified Memorial, About 3 Metres West Of Cox Memorial In Churchyard Of Church Of St Mary	II	Church Street			21 March 1985	ST8901193004; 51°38′09″N 2°09′37″W		1089642	Upload Photo	Q26382056
Unidentified Memorial, About 3 Metres West Of North West Path At 5 Metres From Path Crossing In Churchyard Of Church Of St Mary	II	Church Street			21 March 1985	ST8903092983; 51°38′08″N 2°09′36″W		1089641	Unidentified Memorial, About 3 Metres West Of North West Path At 5 Metres From Path Crossing In Churchyard Of Church Of St Mary More images	Q26382055
Unidentified Memorial, About 4 Metres West Of North West Path At 6 Metres From Path Crossing In Churchyard Of Church Of St Mary	II	Church Street			21 March 1985	ST8902292982; 51°38′08″N 2°09′36″W		1153436	Upload Photo	Q26446182
1, Church Street	II	1, Church Street			6 September 1954	ST8904593136; 51°38′13″N 2°09′35″W		1089657	1, Church Street More images	Q7722853
2, Church Street	II	2, Church Street			21 March 1985	ST8905593097; 51°38′12″N 2°09′34″W		1304678	2, Church Street More images	Q26591629
Herbert Memorial, 2 Metres North West Of Butt Memorial, In Churchyard Of Church Of St Mary	II	Church Street			21 March 1985	ST8904092988; 51°38′08″N 2°09′35″W		1341193	Herbert Memorial, 2 Metres North West Of Butt Memorial, In Churchyard Of Church Of St Mary More images	Q26625310
3 Memorials, Partly To Ralph Family, About 3 Metres South West Of Swinerton Memorials In Churchyard Of Church Of St Mary	II	Church Street			21 March 1985	ST8901792988; 51°38′08″N 2°09′36″W		1153443	Upload Photo	Q26446188
3, Church Street	II	3, Church Street			6 September 1954	ST8904293130; 51°38′13″N 2°09′35″W		1152533	Upload Photo	Q26445449
4, Church Street	II	4, Church Street			21 March 1985	ST8904893094; 51°38′12″N 2°09′35″W		1089663	4, Church Street More images	Q26382077
5, Church Street	II	5, Church Street			6 September 1954	ST8903093124; 51°38′13″N 2°09′36″W		1089658	Upload Photo	Q26382072
6, Church Street	II	6, Church Street			21 March 1985	ST8904293089; 51°38′11″N 2°09′35″W		1152651	6, Church Street More images	Q26445555
8, Church Street	II	8, Church Street			21 March 1985	ST8903793084; 51°38′11″N 2°09′35″W		1341169	8, Church Street More images	Q26625286
10, Church Street	II	10, Church Street			21 March 1985	ST8903393079; 51°38′11″N 2°09′36″W		1152668	10, Church Street More images	Q26445572
12, Church Street	II	12, Church Street			21 March 1985	ST8903093072; 51°38′11″N 2°09′36″W		1089664	12, Church Street More images	Q26382078
13 and 15, Church Street	II	13 and 15, Church Street			6 September 1954	ST8901793094; 51°38′12″N 2°09′36″W		1304721	13 and 15, Church Street More images	Q26591668
14, Church Street	II	14, Church Street			6 September 1954	ST8903293062; 51°38′11″N 2°09′36″W		1341170	14, Church Street More images	Q26625287
16 and 18, Church Street	II	16 and 18, Church Street			21 March 1985	ST8902093055; 51°38′10″N 2°09′36″W		1152701	16 and 18, Church Street More images	Q26445604
Talboys House	II	17, Church Street			6 September 1954	ST8901293087; 51°38′11″N 2°09′37″W		1089660	Talboys House More images	Q26382074
19, Church Street	II	19, Church Street			6 September 1954	ST8900793081; 51°38′11″N 2°09′37″W		1152579	Upload Photo	Q26445489
20, Church Street	II	20, Church Street			21 March 1985	ST8901793044; 51°38′10″N 2°09′36″W		1089665	20, Church Street More images	Q26382079
21, Church Street	II	21, Church Street			6 September 1954	ST8900393075; 51°38′11″N 2°09′37″W		1089661	21, Church Street More images	Q26382075
22 and 24, Church Street	II	22 and 24, Church Street			21 March 1985	ST8901993034; 51°38′10″N 2°09′36″W		1153070	22 and 24, Church Street More images	Q26445839
23, Church Street	II	23, Church Street			6 September 1954	ST8900393065; 51°38′11″N 2°09′37″W		1341168	Upload Photo	Q26625285
26, Church Street	II	26, Church Street			21 March 1985	ST8901793025; 51°38′09″N 2°09′36″W		1089666	Upload Photo	Q26382080
31, Church Street	II	31, Church Street			21 March 1985	ST8899593039; 51°38′10″N 2°09′37″W		1089662	31, Church Street More images	Q26382076
Chipping Croft	II	Cirencester Road			6 September 1954	ST8919693345; 51°38′20″N 2°09′27″W		1153450	Upload Photo	Q26446194
The Royal Oak	II	Cirencester Road			21 March 1985	ST8933993365; 51°38′20″N 2°09′20″W		1341199	The Royal Oak More images	Q26625315
12, 14 and 16, Cirencester Road	II	12, 14 and 16, Cirencester Road			21 March 1985	ST8920393366; 51°38′20″N 2°09′27″W		1277767	Upload Photo	Q26567159
Croft Cottage	II	18, Cirencester Road			6 September 1954	ST8921493346; 51°38′20″N 2°09′26″W		1248748	Upload Photo	Q26540940
22, Cirencester Road	II	22, Cirencester Road			21 March 1985	ST8929193350; 51°38′20″N 2°09′22″W		1089643	22, Cirencester Road More images	Q26382058
24, Cirencester Road	II	24, Cirencester Road			21 March 1985	ST8931793380; 51°38′21″N 2°09′21″W		1153472	Upload Photo	Q26446216
Cutwell Bridge	II	Cutwell			21 March 1985	ST8873192994; 51°38′08″N 2°09′51″W		1089644	Upload Photo	Q26382059
Wiltshire Bridge	II	Fox Hill			27 May 1981	ST8927192963; 51°38′07″N 2°09′23″W		1227608	Wiltshire Bridge More images	Q26521511
The Crown Inn	II	Gumstool Hill			6 September 1954	ST8915393163; 51°38′14″N 2°09′29″W		1341226	The Crown Inn More images	Q26625341
1, Gumstool Hill	II	1, Gumstool Hill			6 September 1954	ST8917593149; 51°38′13″N 2°09′28″W		1089608	1, Gumstool Hill More images	Q26382019
2, 2a, 4 and 6, Gumstool Hill	II	2, 2a, 4 and 6, Gumstool Hill			6 September 1954	ST8913793144; 51°38′13″N 2°09′30″W		1341225	2, 2a, 4 and 6, Gumstool Hill More images	Q26625340
8, Gumstool Hill	II	8, Gumstool Hill			6 September 1954	ST8914393155; 51°38′14″N 2°09′30″W		1089609	8, Gumstool Hill More images	Q26382020
14 and 16, Gumstool Hill	II	14 and 16, Gumstool Hill			21 March 1985	ST8916693173; 51°38′14″N 2°09′29″W		1089610	14 and 16, Gumstool Hill More images	Q26382021
18, Gumstool Hill	II	18, Gumstool Hill			6 September 1954	ST8917493185; 51°38′15″N 2°09′28″W		1089611	18, Gumstool Hill More images	Q26382022
20, Gumstool Hill	II	20, Gumstool Hill			6 September 1954	ST8917693189; 51°38′15″N 2°09′28″W		1153657	20, Gumstool Hill More images	Q26446385
22, Gumstool Hill	II	22, Gumstool Hill			6 September 1954	ST8918293196; 51°38′15″N 2°09′28″W		1089612	22, Gumstool Hill More images	Q26382023
24, Gumstool Hill	II	24, Gumstool Hill			6 September 1954	ST8918693203; 51°38′15″N 2°09′28″W		1153686	24, Gumstool Hill More images	Q26446411
26, Gumstool Hill	II	26, Gumstool Hill			6 September 1954	ST8919693205; 51°38′15″N 2°09′27″W		1089613	26, Gumstool Hill More images	Q26382025
28, Gumstool Hill	II	28, Gumstool Hill			6 September 1954	ST8920293209; 51°38′15″N 2°09′27″W		1153702	28, Gumstool Hill More images	Q26446426
Delburn House	II	38 and 40, Gumstool Hill			21 March 1985	ST8922893259; 51°38′17″N 2°09′25″W		1089614	Upload Photo	Q26382026
1, Hampton Street	II	1, Hampton Street			6 September 1954	ST8888493418; 51°38′22″N 2°09′43″W		1153747	Upload Photo	Q26446469
2 and 4, Hampton Street	II	2 and 4, Hampton Street			6 September 1954	ST8885493420; 51°38′22″N 2°09′45″W		1089615	Upload Photo	Q26382027
Former Tetbury Brewery, Behind Number 6	II	Hampton Street			6 September 1954	ST8883893429; 51°38′22″N 2°09′46″W		1153722	Upload Photo	Q26446442
Brewer's Cottage	II	16, Hampton Street			21 March 1985	ST8879693526; 51°38′26″N 2°09′48″W		1089616	Upload Photo	Q26382028
29, Hampton Street	II	29, Hampton Street			6 September 1954	ST8884493493; 51°38′24″N 2°09′45″W		1089617	Upload Photo	Q26382029
3 and 5, London Road	II	3 and 5, London Road			21 March 1985	ST8891193403; 51°38′22″N 2°09′42″W		1089618	Upload Photo	Q26382030
7, London Road	II	7, London Road			6 September 1954	ST8891793410; 51°38′22″N 2°09′42″W		1304144	Upload Photo	Q26591151
Former Stable Block at Number 44 (the Old House)	II	Long Street			21 March 1985	ST8888293299; 51°38′18″N 2°09′43″W		1089588	Upload Photo	Q26381999
Number 32,Including Doorway To Number 34	II	32, Long Street			6 September 1954	ST8893093252; 51°38′17″N 2°09′41″W		1089585	Upload Photo	Q26381996
1, Long Street	II	1, Long Street			6 September 1954	ST8905793159; 51°38′14″N 2°09′34″W		1341187	1, Long Street More images	Q26625304
2, Long Street	II	2, Long Street			21 March 1985	ST8903993139; 51°38′13″N 2°09′35″W		1089624	Upload Photo	Q26382036
3 and 5, Long Street	II	3 and 5, Long Street			6 September 1954	ST8905093162; 51°38′14″N 2°09′35″W		1153793	Upload Photo	Q26446536
6, Long Street	II	6, Long Street			21 March 1985	ST8902893146; 51°38′13″N 2°09′36″W		1154017	6, Long Street More images	Q26446832
7, Long Street	II	7, Long Street			6 September 1954	ST8904593166; 51°38′14″N 2°09′35″W		1089619	Upload Photo	Q26382031
The Close Hotel	II	8, Long Street			6 September 1954	ST8901793157; 51°38′14″N 2°09′36″W		1341191	The Close Hotel More images	Q26625308
10 and 12, Long Street	II	10 and 12, Long Street			6 September 1954	ST8899593180; 51°38′14″N 2°09′37″W		1154036	Upload Photo	Q26446859
11, 13 and 15, Long Street	II	11, 13 and 15, Long Street			21 March 1985	ST8902993178; 51°38′14″N 2°09′36″W		1089620	Upload Photo	Q26382032
14, Long Street	II	14, Long Street			6 September 1954	ST8897893193; 51°38′15″N 2°09′38″W		1089625	Upload Photo	Q26382037
18, Long Street	II	18, Long Street			6 September 1954	ST8896493205; 51°38′15″N 2°09′39″W		1089626	Upload Photo	Q26382038
20, Long Street	II	20, Long Street			6 September 1954	ST8896193208; 51°38′15″N 2°09′39″W		1303975	Upload Photo	Q26590992
22, Long Street	II	22, Long Street			6 September 1954	ST8895793215; 51°38′15″N 2°09′39″W		1341192	Upload Photo	Q26625309
The Ormond at Tetbury	II	23, Long Street, GL8 8AA			21 March 1985	ST8899893205; 51°38′15″N 2°09′37″W		1153846	Upload Photo	Q26446607
24, Long Street	II	24, Long Street			6 September 1954	ST8895393222; 51°38′16″N 2°09′40″W		1154090	Upload Photo	Q26447004
25, Long Street	II	25, Long Street			6 September 1954	ST8899293211; 51°38′15″N 2°09′38″W		1341188	Upload Photo	Q26625305
26, Long Street	II	26, Long Street			6 September 1954	ST8895093230; 51°38′16″N 2°09′40″W		1089584	Upload Photo	Q26381995
27, Long Street	II	27, Long Street			21 March 1985	ST8898993219; 51°38′16″N 2°09′38″W		1153864	Upload Photo	Q26446633
28, Long Street	II	28, Long Street			21 March 1985	ST8894393235; 51°38′16″N 2°09′40″W		1341212	Upload Photo	Q26625327
29, Long Street	II	29, Long Street			6 September 1954	ST8898493225; 51°38′16″N 2°09′38″W		1089621	Upload Photo	Q26382033
Gastrell House	II	33, Long Street			21 March 1985	ST8897993235; 51°38′16″N 2°09′38″W		1153883	Upload Photo	Q26446659
Spencer House	II	34, Long Street			6 September 1954	ST8892793262; 51°38′17″N 2°09′41″W		1341213	Upload Photo	Q26625328
35 And Adjoining Building To Left	II	Long Street			21 March 1985	ST8897293241; 51°38′16″N 2°09′39″W		1341189	Upload Photo	Q26625306
36 and 38, Long Street	II	36 and 38, Long Street			6 September 1954	ST8892193272; 51°38′17″N 2°09′41″W		1089586	Upload Photo	Q26381998
39a and 39, Long Street	II	39a and 39, Long Street			6 September 1954	ST8896393255; 51°38′17″N 2°09′39″W		1304062	Upload Photo	Q26591075
41, Long Street	II	41, Long Street			6 September 1954	ST8895393269; 51°38′17″N 2°09′40″W		1089622	41, Long Street More images	Q26382034
Porch House	I	42, Long Street			6 September 1954	ST8891493284; 51°38′18″N 2°09′42″W		1089587	Porch House More images	Q17540469
43, Long Street	II	43, Long Street			6 September 1954	ST8894493280; 51°38′18″N 2°09′40″W		1089623	Upload Photo	Q26382035
The Old House	II	44, Long Street			6 September 1954	ST8890593298; 51°38′18″N 2°09′42″W		1341214	Upload Photo	Q26625329
45, Long Street	II	45, Long Street			6 September 1954	ST8894093285; 51°38′18″N 2°09′40″W		1304045	Upload Photo	Q26591058
46, Long Street	II	46, Long Street			6 September 1954	ST8890693313; 51°38′19″N 2°09′42″W		1341215	Upload Photo	Q26625330
48, Long Street	II	48, Long Street			6 September 1954	ST8890393323; 51°38′19″N 2°09′42″W		1089589	Upload Photo	Q26382000
50 and 52, Long Street	II	50 and 52, Long Street			6 September 1954	ST8889893330; 51°38′19″N 2°09′43″W		1089590	Upload Photo	Q26382001
54 and 56, Long Street	II	54 and 56, Long Street			6 September 1954	ST8889093342; 51°38′20″N 2°09′43″W		1154198	Upload Photo	Q26447223
55, Long Street	II	55, Long Street			6 September 1954	ST8891893329; 51°38′19″N 2°09′42″W		1341190	Upload Photo	Q26625307
57, Long Street	II	57, Long Street			6 September 1954	ST8891493335; 51°38′19″N 2°09′42″W		1304014	Upload Photo	Q26591030
58, Long Street	II	58, Long Street			6 September 1954	ST8888593349; 51°38′20″N 2°09′43″W		1089591	Upload Photo	Q26382002
Belgrave House (Number 8), Grosvenor House (Number 9) And Grosvenor Cottage	II	Market Place			6 September 1954	ST8912193097; 51°38′12″N 2°09′31″W		1089594	Upload Photo	Q26382005
K6 Telephone Kiosk	II	Market Place			21 June 1990	ST8915093136; 51°38′13″N 2°09′29″W		1089180	K6 Telephone Kiosk More images	Q26381586
Market House	I	Market Place			6 September 1954	ST8906293118; 51°38′12″N 2°09′34″W		1303914	Market House More images	Q17525719
3, Market Place	II	3, Market Place			21 March 1985	ST8908093110; 51°38′12″N 2°09′33″W		1089592	3, Market Place More images	Q26382003
4, Market Place	II	4, Market Place			6 September 1954	ST8908993114; 51°38′12″N 2°09′33″W		1154254	4, Market Place More images	Q26447299
5, Market Place	II	5, Market Place			6 September 1954	ST8909393114; 51°38′12″N 2°09′32″W		1089593	Upload Photo	Q26382004
10 and 11, Market Place	II	10 and 11, Market Place			21 March 1985	ST8913493112; 51°38′12″N 2°09′30″W		1154271	10 and 11, Market Place More images	Q26447321
13, Market Place	II	13, Market Place			21 March 1985	ST8914493109; 51°38′12″N 2°09′30″W		1089595	13, Market Place More images	Q26382006
The Talbot Hotel	II	14, Market Place			6 September 1954	ST8916693121; 51°38′12″N 2°09′29″W		1303881	The Talbot Hotel More images	Q26590912
Crew House	II	15, Market Place			6 September 1954	ST8916893130; 51°38′13″N 2°09′28″W		1089596	Crew House More images	Q26382007
Avon House	II	16, Market Place			6 September 1954	ST8917193142; 51°38′13″N 2°09′28″W		1154300	Avon House More images	Q26447361
17, Market Place	II	17, Market Place			21 March 1985	ST8913293137; 51°38′13″N 2°09′30″W		1341216	17, Market Place More images	Q26625331
18, Market Place	II	18, Market Place			6 September 1954	ST8912693140; 51°38′13″N 2°09′31″W		1303837	18, Market Place More images	Q26590872
19, Market Place	II	19, Market Place			6 September 1954	ST8911793140; 51°38′13″N 2°09′31″W		1341217	19, Market Place More images	Q26625332
20, Market Place	II	20, Market Place			6 September 1954	ST8910893140; 51°38′13″N 2°09′32″W		1303842	20, Market Place More images	Q26590877
21 and 22, Market Place	II	21 and 22, Market Place			6 September 1954	ST8910193141; 51°38′13″N 2°09′32″W		1089597	21 and 22, Market Place More images	Q26382008
23, Market Place	II	23, Market Place			6 September 1954	ST8909493146; 51°38′13″N 2°09′32″W		1089598	23, Market Place More images	Q26382009
The Snooty Fox Hotel	II	24, Market Place			21 March 1985	ST8908693162; 51°38′14″N 2°09′33″W		1154392	The Snooty Fox Hotel More images	Q26447482
Church of St Saviour	II*	New Church Street			18 April 1973	ST8877693261; 51°38′17″N 2°09′49″W		1154438	Church of St Saviour More images	Q7595439
Lychgate at Church of St Saviour	II	New Church Street			21 March 1985	ST8880493250; 51°38′17″N 2°09′47″W		1089600	Upload Photo	Q26382011
War Memorial In The Churchyard Of The Church Of St Saviour	II	New Church Street			3 April 2012	ST8879693254; 51°38′17″N 2°09′48″W		1406890	War Memorial In The Churchyard Of The Church Of St Saviour More images	Q26675904
Elgin House	II	1, New Church Street			6 September 1954	ST8886893382; 51°38′21″N 2°09′44″W		1341218	Upload Photo	Q26625333
2-10, New Church Street	II	2-10, New Church Street			21 March 1985	ST8887593336; 51°38′19″N 2°09′44″W		1154483	Upload Photo	Q26447602
Number 3 (part of Coombe House) with Railings and Gate	II	3, New Church Street			21 March 1985	ST8886193368; 51°38′20″N 2°09′44″W		1154406	Upload Photo	Q26447503
Number 5 with Railings and Gate	II	5, New Church Street			21 March 1985	ST8885493354; 51°38′20″N 2°09′45″W		1089599	Upload Photo	Q26382010
12-20, New Church Street	II	12-20, New Church Street			21 March 1985	ST8885393303; 51°38′18″N 2°09′45″W		1341220	Upload Photo	Q26625335
19, 21 and 23, New Church Street	II	19, 21 and 23, New Church Street			21 March 1985	ST8881693294; 51°38′18″N 2°09′47″W		1154430	Upload Photo	Q26447535
25, New Church Street	II	25, New Church Street			21 March 1985	ST8881293284; 51°38′18″N 2°09′47″W		1341219	Upload Photo	Q26625334
27 and 29, New Church Street	II	27 and 29, New Church Street			21 March 1985	ST8877193217; 51°38′16″N 2°09′49″W		1089601	Upload Photo	Q26382012
Stone Wall	II	New Church Street & West Street			12 July 2007	ST8876593132; 51°38′13″N 2°09′49″W		1392198	Upload Photo	Q26671433
3, Silver Street	II	3, Silver Street			21 March 1985	ST8914693097; 51°38′12″N 2°09′30″W		1303790	3, Silver Street More images	Q26590830
7, Silver Street	II	7, Silver Street			6 September 1954	ST8914293076; 51°38′11″N 2°09′30″W		1089602	7, Silver Street More images	Q26382013
York House	II	8, Silver Street			6 September 1954	ST8916193080; 51°38′11″N 2°09′29″W		1341222	York House More images	Q26625337
9, Silver Street	II	9, Silver Street			6 September 1954	ST8914293069; 51°38′11″N 2°09′30″W		1303764	9, Silver Street More images	Q26590805
10, Silver Street	II	10, Silver Street			6 September 1954	ST8915993069; 51°38′11″N 2°09′29″W		1154571	10, Silver Street More images	Q26447725
The Old Surgery	II	11, Silver Street			6 September 1954	ST8913893062; 51°38′11″N 2°09′30″W		1341221	The Old Surgery More images	Q26625336
12, Silver Street	II	12, Silver Street			21 March 1985	ST8916493061; 51°38′10″N 2°09′29″W		1089604	12, Silver Street More images	Q26382015
13 and 15, Silver Street	II	13 and 15, Silver Street			21 March 1985	ST8913793050; 51°38′10″N 2°09′30″W		1154540	13 and 15, Silver Street More images	Q26447683
14, Silver Street	II	14, Silver Street			21 March 1985	ST8917093051; 51°38′10″N 2°09′28″W		1154650	14, Silver Street More images	Q26447834
Number 16 and Rosemount	II	Silver Street			21 March 1985	ST8917493041; 51°38′10″N 2°09′28″W		1154683	Number 16 and Rosemount More images	Q26447881
Old Fox House	II	34, Silver Street			21 March 1985	ST8921393009; 51°38′09″N 2°09′26″W		1304250	Old Fox House More images	Q26591250
35, Silver Street	II	35, Silver Street			21 March 1985	ST8920392995; 51°38′08″N 2°09′27″W		1089603	Upload Photo	Q26382014
Former Stable Block in Yard at Back of the Priory	II	The Chipping			21 March 1985	ST8906093323; 51°38′19″N 2°09′34″W		1089655	Upload Photo	Q26382069
Malt House, To Rear Of Numbers 13 And 15	II	The Chipping			21 March 1985	ST8917493217; 51°38′16″N 2°09′28″W		1152409	Upload Photo	Q26445336
Oak House	II	1, The Chipping			6 September 1954	ST8913993196; 51°38′15″N 2°09′30″W		1304787	Oak House More images	Q26591725
5, 13 and 15, The Chipping	I	5, 13 and 15, The Chipping			6 September 1954	ST8916293221; 51°38′16″N 2°09′29″W		1089690	5, 13 and 15, The Chipping More images	Q17540492
The Manse	II	10, The Chipping			6 September 1954	ST8907693246; 51°38′16″N 2°09′33″W		1341204	The Manse More images	Q26625320
12, The Chipping	II	12, The Chipping			6 September 1954	ST8907793254; 51°38′17″N 2°09′33″W		1089652	12, The Chipping More images	Q26382066
Stafford House	II	14, The Chipping			6 September 1954	ST8908593260; 51°38′17″N 2°09′33″W		1341205	Stafford House More images	Q26625321
Berkeley House	II	16, The Chipping			6 September 1954	ST8908993271; 51°38′17″N 2°09′33″W		1089653	Berkeley House More images	Q26382067
St Michael's House	II	17, The Chipping			6 September 1954	ST8916993236; 51°38′16″N 2°09′28″W		1341183	St Michael's House More images	Q26625300
18, The Chipping	II	18, The Chipping			6 September 1954	ST8909293284; 51°38′18″N 2°09′32″W		1341206	18, The Chipping More images	Q26625322
Ferndale House	II	19, The Chipping			6 September 1954	ST8917593246; 51°38′16″N 2°09′28″W		1089691	Ferndale House More images	Q26382104
21 and 23, The Chipping	II	21 and 23, The Chipping			6 September 1954	ST8917993255; 51°38′17″N 2°09′28″W		1304767	21 and 23, The Chipping More images	Q26591708
22, The Chipping	II	22, The Chipping			6 September 1954	ST8912593270; 51°38′17″N 2°09′31″W		1152521	22, The Chipping More images	Q26445438
24, The Chipping	II	24, The Chipping			6 September 1954	ST8913993263; 51°38′17″N 2°09′30″W		1089656	24, The Chipping More images	Q26382070
25, The Chipping	II	25, The Chipping			6 September 1954	ST8918393263; 51°38′17″N 2°09′28″W		1089692	25, The Chipping More images	Q26382105
29 and 31, The Chipping	II	29 and 31, The Chipping			6 September 1954	ST8918893273; 51°38′17″N 2°09′27″W		1089649	29 and 31, The Chipping More images	Q26382063
33, The Chipping	II	33, The Chipping			6 September 1954	ST8919093279; 51°38′18″N 2°09′27″W		1341203	33, The Chipping More images	Q26625319
35, The Chipping	II	35, The Chipping			6 September 1954	ST8919493288; 51°38′18″N 2°09′27″W		1089650	35, The Chipping More images	Q26382064
37, The Chipping	II	37, The Chipping			6 September 1954	ST8919693293; 51°38′18″N 2°09′27″W		1089651	37, The Chipping More images	Q26382065
The Priory	II	The Chipping			6 September 1954	ST8909293317; 51°38′19″N 2°09′32″W		1089654	The Priory More images	Q26382068
Barton Abbotts	II	The Green			6 September 1954	ST8912292993; 51°38′08″N 2°09′31″W		1089646	Barton Abbotts More images	Q26382060
East Barton	II	The Green			21 March 1985	ST8913692992; 51°38′08″N 2°09′30″W		1153542	East Barton More images	Q26446276
Former Stable Entrance To Barton Abbotts, About 8 Metres East Of East Barton	II	The Green			21 March 1985	ST8915093001; 51°38′09″N 2°09′29″W		1341201	Former Stable Entrance To Barton Abbotts, About 8 Metres East Of East Barton More images	Q26625317
Number 9 (Including Back Door To Number 9, Formerly Number 3) And Incorporating Former Number 11 And 13	II	9, The Green			6 September 1954	ST8908593003; 51°38′09″N 2°09′33″W		1341200	Number 9 (Including Back Door To Number 9, Formerly Number 3) And Incorporating Former Number 11 And 13 More images	Q26625316
Stables at the Vicarage	II	The Green			21 March 1985	ST8906793019; 51°38′09″N 2°09′34″W		1153581	Upload Photo	Q26446312
The Vicarage	II	The Green			6 September 1954	ST8905493054; 51°38′10″N 2°09′34″W		1341202	The Vicarage More images	Q26625318
1, The Green	II	1, The Green			6 September 1954	ST8907693002; 51°38′09″N 2°09′33″W		1304254	1, The Green More images	Q26591254
2 and 4, The Green	II	2 and 4, The Green			21 March 1985	ST8902793022; 51°38′09″N 2°09′36″W		1153571	2 and 4, The Green More images	Q26446303
Tithe House	II	10, The Green			6 September 1954	ST8908093020; 51°38′09″N 2°09′33″W		1089605	Tithe House More images	Q26382016
12, The Green	II	12, The Green			6 September 1954	ST8908993020; 51°38′09″N 2°09′33″W		1341223	12, The Green More images	Q26625338
14, The Green	II	14, The Green			6 September 1954	ST8909693019; 51°38′09″N 2°09′32″W		1089606	14, The Green More images	Q26382017
15, The Green	II	15, The Green			6 September 1954	ST8909893001; 51°38′09″N 2°09′32″W		1153526	15, The Green More images	Q26446261
19, The Green	II	19, The Green			6 September 1954	ST8916792995; 51°38′08″N 2°09′29″W		1089647	19, The Green More images	Q26382061
Sundial House	II	20, The Green			6 September 1954	ST8912893024; 51°38′09″N 2°09′31″W		1341224	Sundial House More images	Q26625339
21, The Green	II	21, The Green			6 September 1954	ST8917592999; 51°38′08″N 2°09′28″W		1304236	21, The Green More images	Q26591236
23, The Green	II	23, The Green			6 September 1954	ST8918492998; 51°38′08″N 2°09′28″W		1089648	23, The Green More images	Q26382062
Pump	II	The Green			21 March 1985	ST8917493011; 51°38′09″N 2°09′28″W		1089607	Pump More images	Q26382018
23, West Street	II	23, West Street			21 March 1985	ST8893692992; 51°38′08″N 2°09′41″W		1341242	23, West Street More images	Q26625355
Former Police Station And Petty Sessional Court, Now Known As Tetbury Council Offices And Police Museum	II				2 October 2013	ST8890593358; 51°38′20″N 2°09′42″W		1415897	Upload Photo	Q26676473
Highfield Farmhouse	II	Off A433			21 March 1985	ST8957194256; 51°38′49″N 2°09′08″W		1303644	Upload Photo	Q26590691
Numbers 25 and 25a Church Street and 1 Warns Court	II				6 September 1954	ST8899193047; 51°38′10″N 2°09′38″W		1152613	Upload Photo	Q26445520
Summerhouse in Woods about 100 Metres South West of Centre of Wiltshire Bridge	II				21 March 1985	ST8920892890; 51°38′05″N 2°09′26″W		1152322	Upload Photo	Q26445257
Summerhouse in Woods about 90 Metres Due South of Centre of Wiltshire Bridge	II				21 March 1985	ST8925392899; 51°38′05″N 2°09′24″W		1089688	Upload Photo	Q26382102
Waters Bridge	II				21 March 1985	ST8894592863; 51°38′04″N 2°09′40″W		1152348	Upload Photo	Q26445282

== See also ==
- Grade I listed buildings in Gloucestershire
- Grade II* listed buildings in Gloucestershire

== Sources ==
- Verey, David; Brooks, Alan (1999), Gloucestershire 1: The Cotswolds, The Buildings of England, New Haven and London: Yale University Press, ISBN 978-0-300-09604-0
