= Francis Hiorne =

British architect (1744–1789)

Francis Hiorne FSA (1744 – 9 December 1789) was an architect and builder based in Warwick.

== Background ==
He was the son of William Hiorne (c.1712 – 22 April 1776) and Mary Duncalfe. He was elected a Fellow of the Society of Antiquaries on 7 April 1784.

== Works ==
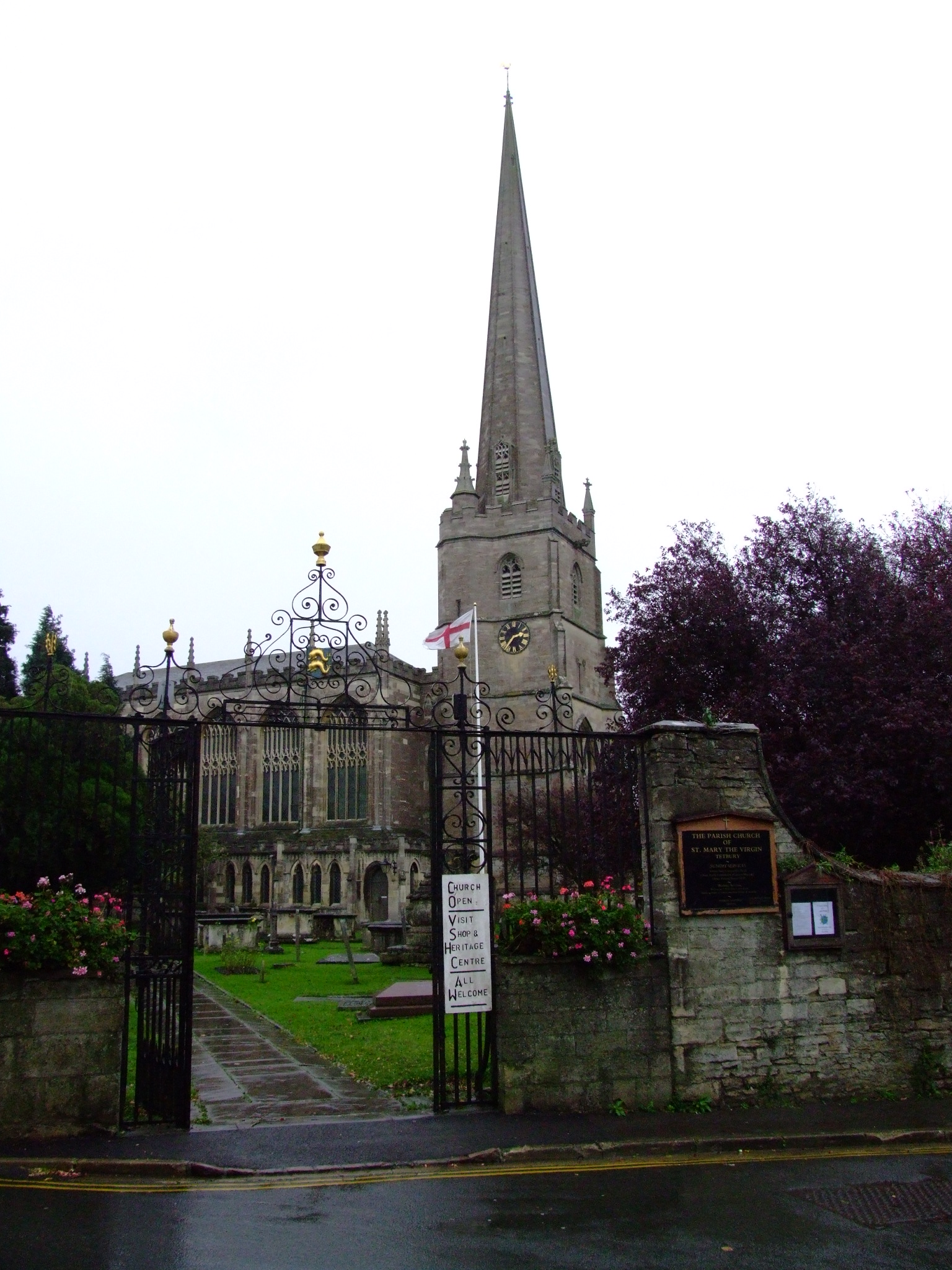
St Mary’s Church, Tetbury

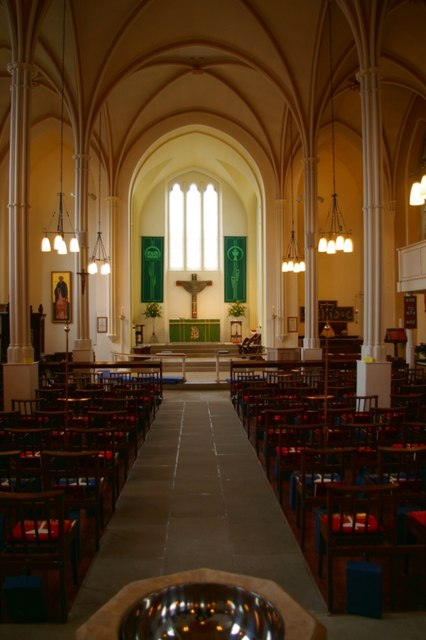
St Mary and St Giles, Stoney Stratford

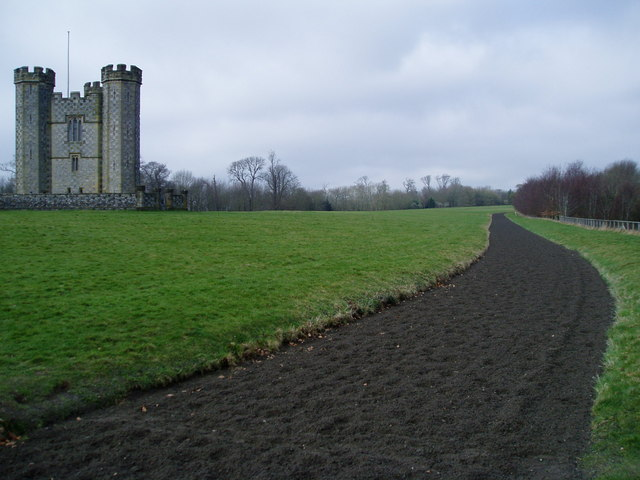
Hiorne Tower, Arundel Castle

- Galleries in St Mary’s Church, Warwick, 1769 reconstruction
- St Mary’s Church, Tetbury, Glos. (1771–1781)
- St Anne’s Church, Belfast (1772–1776) demolished 1900. St. Anne's Cathedral now stands on the site.
- St Bartholomew’s Church, Tardebigge 1776 – 1777
- St Mary & St Giles Church, Stony Stratford 1777
- Hiorne’s Tower, Arundel Castle 1789 - 1790

He also influenced the design of Rosemary Street Presbyterian Church, Belfast, erected in 1783.
