= Tetbury Woolsack Races =

U.K. sporting event

Coordinates: 51.6375°N 2.1564°W

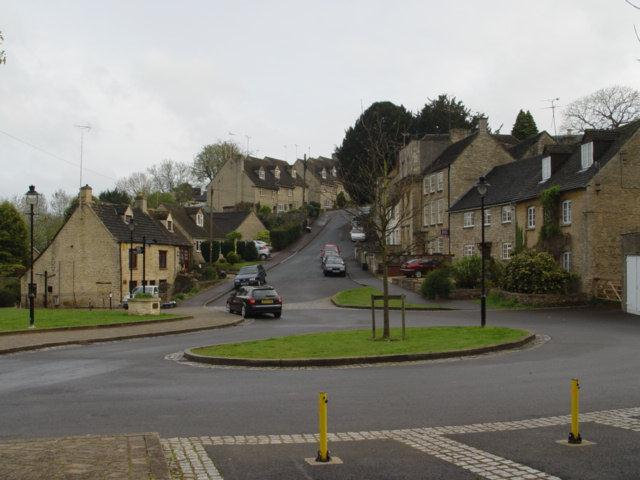
View of Tetbury, looking up Gumstool Hill

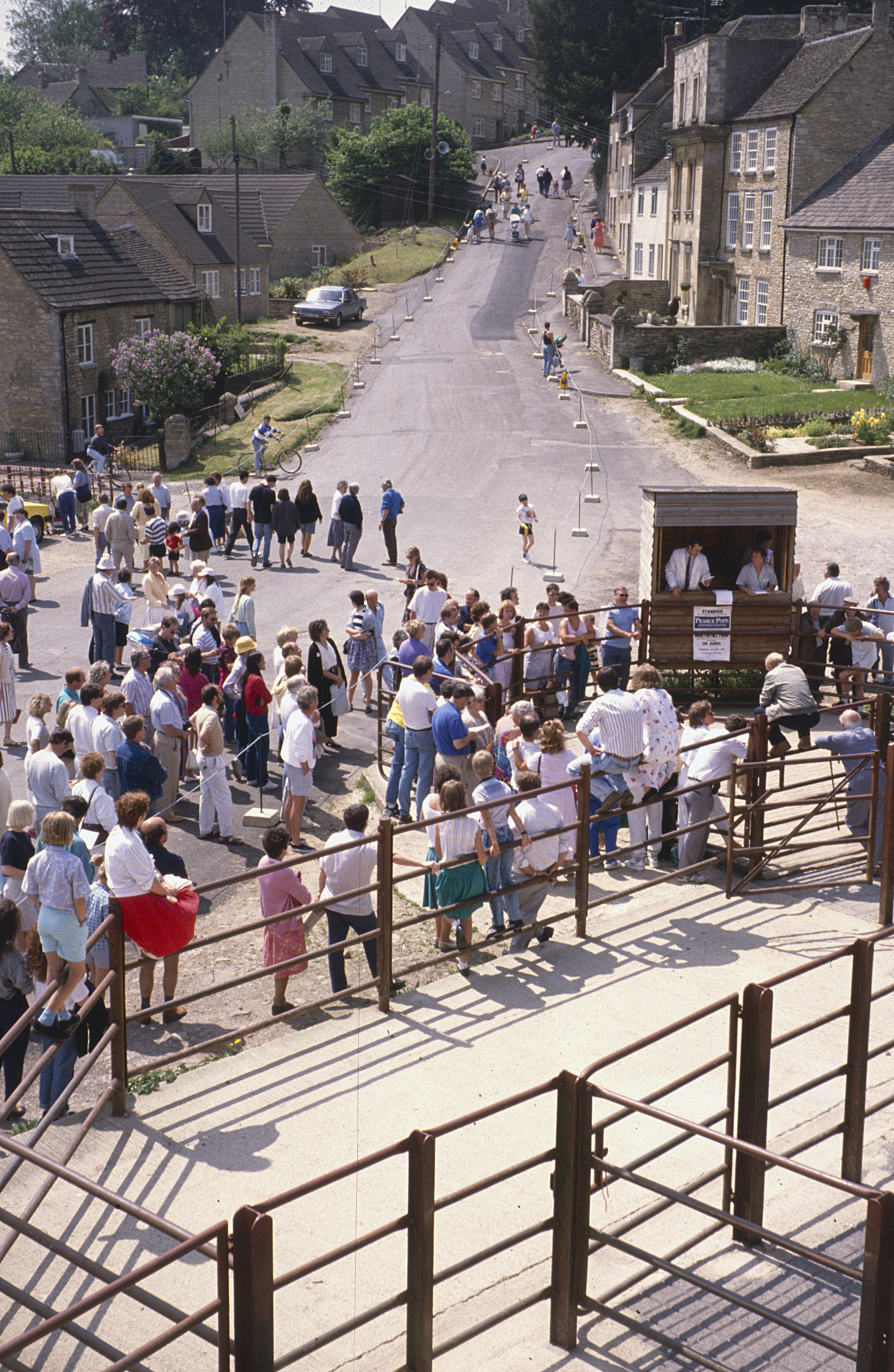
Spectators at the 1985 Tetbury Woolsack Race

The Tetbury Woolsack Races are an annual sporting event in the English town of Tetbury, in Gloucestershire, where competitors must race up and down the steepest street in the town carrying a full woolsack on their back. It is held each year on the Whitsun Bank Holiday Monday.

The races take place on Gumstool Hill between two public houses, the Royal Oak (the bottom of the hill) and the Crown (at the top). People can take part either as individuals or as part of a team. The individuals race up the hill, the teams (with four members swapping places at each end of the course) race up and down the hill twice.

The men race with a 60-pound (27 kg) woolsack, women have 30 pounds (14 kg). There are also youth races where boys ages 16–18 races with a 30 lb sack, and a children's class. The weight of the children's woolsack is unspecified but is likely about the same as a pillow.

Regular competitors include local rugby teams, the British Army and the Norfolk Mountain Rescue Team.
