= Aston Down =

- Aston Down from the south
- IATA: none; ICAO: none

Summary
- Airport type: Private
- Owner: Cotswold Gliding Club
- Operator: Cotswold Gliding Club
- Location: Minchinhampton, Gloucestershire
- In use: October 1938 – 1967 (RAF)
- Elevation AMSL: 600 ft / 183 m
- Coordinates: 51°42′27″N 002°07′28″W

Map
- Location in Gloucestershire

Runways
Direction	Length		Surface
Direction	ft	m	Surface
02/20	4,855	1,480	Tarmac
08/26	3,280	1,000	Tarmac
- (grid reference SO9101)

Aston Down is in Gloucestershire, South West England, 2.5 miles (4 km) east of Minchinhampton, 6 miles (10 km) southeast of Stroud and 7 miles (11 km) west of Cirencester. The nearest settlement is the large village of Chalford, 1 mile (1.6 km) to the northwest.

The airfield was used by the Royal Air Force from the First World War until 1967 when the Cotswold Gliding Club moved in from their previous base near Tetbury. In 2002 the land and most of hangars surrounding the airfield were sold by the Ministry of Defence to private developers for use as industrial units.

== History ==
=== First World War ===
The airfield was originally opened as RAF Minchinhampton and was first used in the First World War, serving as an aerodrome for the Australian Flying Corps with No. 2 Squadron AFC flying the Royal Aircraft Factory S.E.5a and the Sopwith Pup and No. 3 Squadron AFC flying the Avro 504. The airfield closed shortly afterwards.

=== Reopening ===
In 1938 the airfield reopened under the new name of RAF Aston Down at the request of the residents of Minchinhampton town, which lies about 1 mile (1.6 km) to the west of the airfield, who feared not enemy attack, but a fall in the value of their houses.

During the Second World War the main present unit was No. 20 Maintenance Unit RAF (MU) which stored and prepared aircraft. The unit arrived during October 1938 and left in September 1960. The next unit to arrive was No. 12 Group Pool RAF which arrived during August 1939, the units name was changed to No. 5 Operational Training Unit RAF (OTU) before being renamed No. 55 OTU. The unit trained Hawker Hurricane and Bristol Blenheim pilots before being renamed No. 3 Tactical Exercise Unit RAF at RAF Annan. This was redesignated on 18 December 1944 and moved back to Aston Down where the unit flew Hawker Typhoons.

During 1941 the second longest staying unit arrived which was No. 9 Ferry Pool ATA of the Air Transport Auxiliary which transported aircraft from the buildings of No. 20 MU to operational airfields. The unit was renamed No. 187 Squadron RAF and moved to RAF Benson during January 1953. In August 1941 No. 52 OTU joined the station from RAF Debden and the unit trained daytime fighter pilots but after two years in August 1943 the unit moved out. The Fighter Leader School moved in during August 1943 operating Supermarine Spitfires moving from RAF Charmy Down but after only four months the unit left.

First operational squadron to arrive was No. 180 Squadron RAF which had moved to RAF Dunsfold on 18 August 1943 and a detachment was based at RAF Aston Down until 12 April 1943 flying the North American Mitchell. During the time No. 4 Squadron RAF arrived on 3 January 1944 and stayed until 2 March 1944 flying the de Havilland Mosquito XVI.

=== Post Second World War ===
Sometime after the Second World War the hangars were used by No. 5 Maintenance Unit RAF which was based at RAF Kemble.

On 1 February 1953 No. 187 Squadron RAF reformed at the airfield. The unit was renamed from No. 2 Home Ferry Unit and initially only flew the Avro Anson C.19 but in March 1955 the Vickers Varsity T.1 was added and in April of the same year Anson C.12's were also added but just over two years later the unit disbanded on 2 September 1957 at the airfield.

More recently the airfield was used as a satellite airfield for the Central Flying School at RAF Little Rissington, with trainee flying instructors practising their circuits in BAC Jet Provosts. Visits by the Red Arrows were also frequent until their departure from the nearby Kemble Airport in 1983. Since the sale of the airfield it no longer sees any RAF flying activity.

The following RAF Regiment squadrons and unit were here at some point:

- No. 2717 Squadron RAF Regiment
- No. 2719 Squadron RAF Regiment
- No. 2724 Squadron RAF Regiment
- No. 2742 Squadron RAF Regiment
- No. 2757 Squadron RAF Regiment
- No. 2759 Squadron RAF Regiment
- No. 2777 Squadron RAF Regiment
- No. 2804 Squadron RAF Regiment
- No. 27 Group Communication Flight RAF

== Current use ==
In 1967 the Cotswold Gliding Club (CGC) moved to Aston Down, which in 1981 became surplus to requirements and was sold to the Club by the Ministry of Defence (MOD). Having since acquired further land, the CGC now owns most of the airfield within the perimeter track.

DEFRA occupy a secure facility to the north of the airfield housing the SVS Aston Down Wildlife Unit.

== Industry and the environment ==
The land surrounding the airfield, including a number of large hangars (visible in the photograph above), continued to be used by the MOD until 2002, when it was sold to the development firm Leda Properties to be let as warehousing and industrial units. In 2005, following a Freedom of Information request, the local newspaper revealed that Aston Down is contaminated with arsenic, hydrocarbons and radium.

== See also ==
- Cotswold Gliding Club
- List of former Royal Air Force stations
