= Cotswold Airport =

Civilian airport in Gloucestershire, England

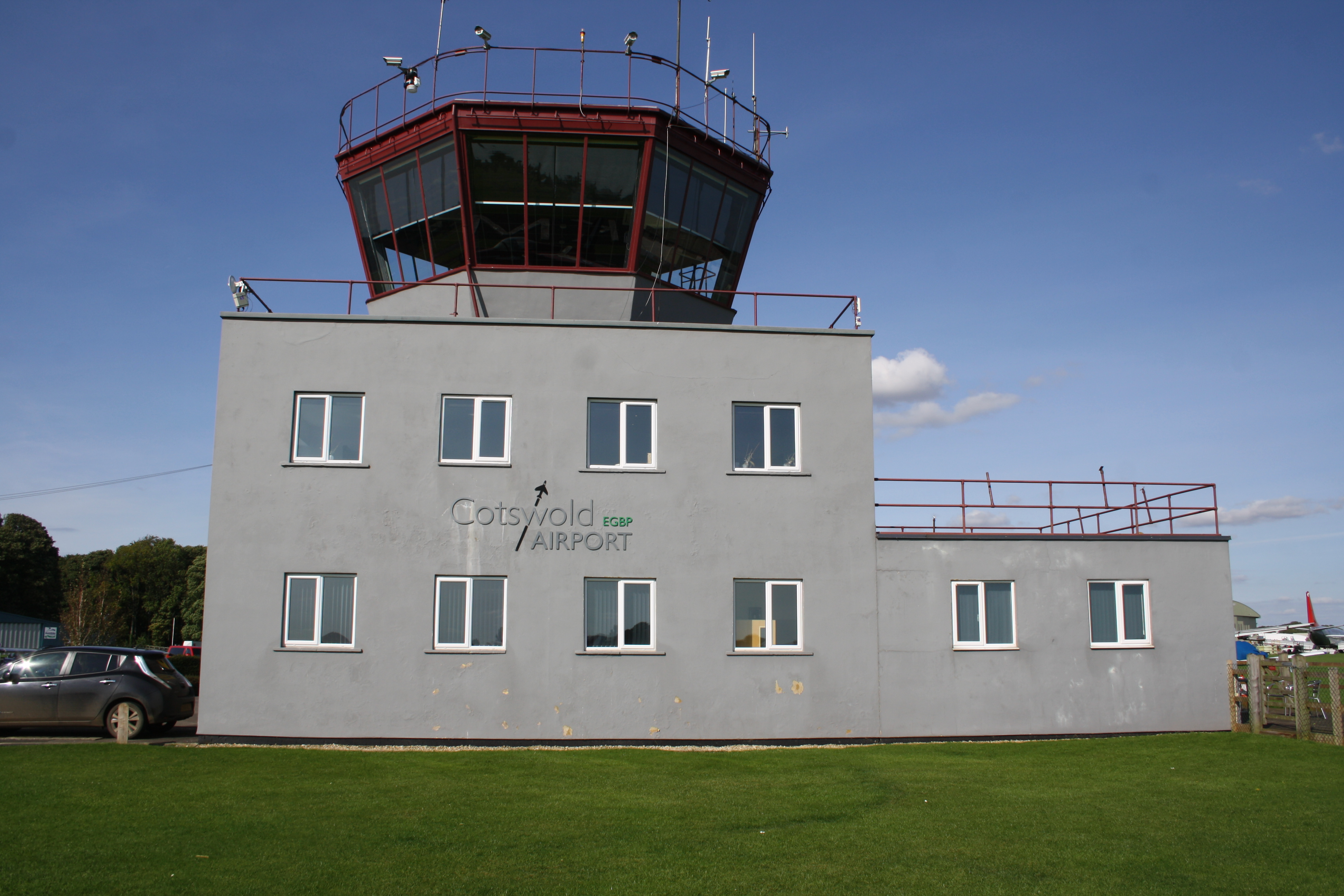
- Cotswold Airport control tower
- IATA: GBA; ICAO: EGBP

Summary
- Airport type: Private
- Owner: Ronan Harvey
- Operator: Kemble Air Services Limited
- Location: Cirencester
- Elevation AMSL: 436 ft (133 m)
- Coordinates: 51°40′05″N 002°03′25″W
- Website: www.cotswoldairport.com

Map
- Location in Gloucestershire

Runways
Direction	Length		Surface
Direction	m	ft	Surface
08/26	2,009	6,561	Asphalt
08/26	560	1,837	Grass
- Sources: UK AIP at NATS

Cotswold Airport (IATA: GBA, ICAO: EGBP; formerly Kemble Airfield) is a private general aviation airport, near the village of Kemble in Gloucestershire, England. Located 5 miles (8.0 km) southwest of Cirencester, it was built as a Royal Air Force (RAF) station and was known as RAF Kemble. The Red Arrows aerobatics team was based there until 1983. Since 2000, it is used for the storage and recycling of retired airliners, as well as flying schools, clubs, and industry.

Cotswold Airport is clear of controlled airspace, allowing free movement for training aircraft. It is centrally positioned between Cheltenham, Gloucester and Swindon. The nearest railway station is at Kemble.

== History ==
=== RAF Kemble ===
Construction work for RAF Kemble began in 1936, and the first operational unit to arrive at the station was No. 5 Maintenance Unit on 22 June 1938. In 1940, No. 4 Service Ferry Pool moved to the station from Cardiff, and Kemble became one of the main bases for the aircraft ferrying operations of the Air Transport Auxiliary in this region of the British Isles. Around the same time, Kemble was also the home of No. 1 Overseas Aircraft Preparation Unit (OAPU).

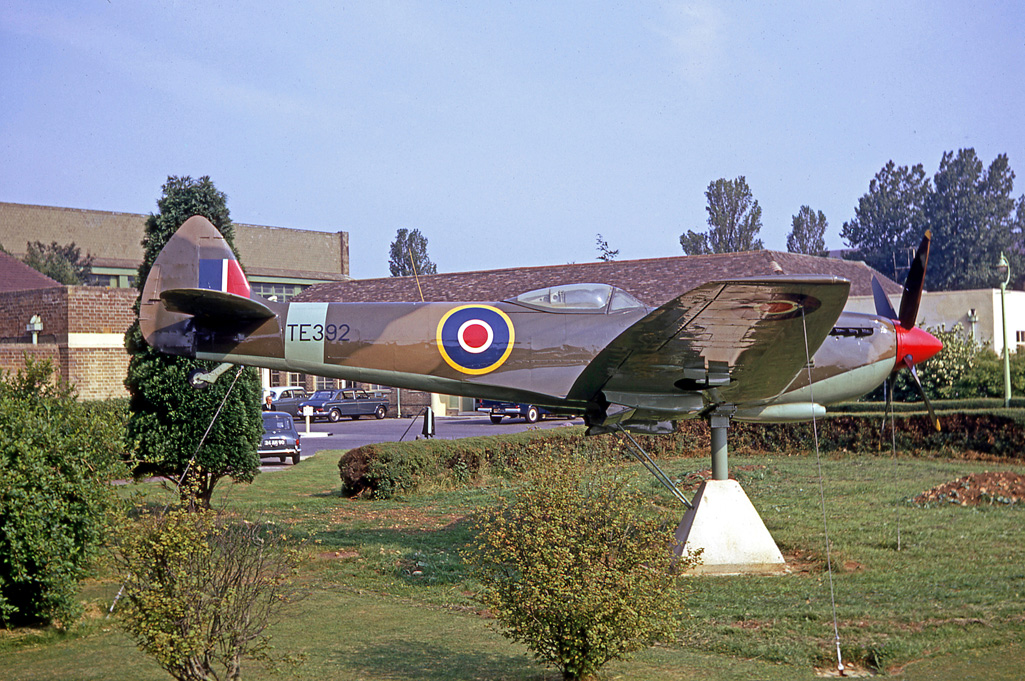
The RAF Kemble main entrance area in 1967 with a pre-war hangar in the left background and a Mk XVI Spitfire as gate guardian

From 1966 until 1983, Kemble housed the Red Arrows, the RAF's aerobatic display team, which operated Folland Gnats and BAe Hawks. After the Red Arrows moved to RAF Scampton, the station was used by the US Air Force as a maintenance facility, initially for Fairchild Republic A-10 Thunderbolt II aircraft, followed by Northrop F-5s, McDonnell Douglas F-15 Eagles, Lockheed C-130 Hercules and Boeing KC-135 Stratotankers.

Following the end of the Cold War, the US Air Force left the station and it was returned to the Ministry of Defence (MoD) on 31 March 1992 with airfield operations stopping. The Royal Air Force withdrew on 31 July 1992. The British Army made use of the site to store surplus vehicles and equipment.

=== Civilian use ===
The MoD initially leased buildings on the former station before selling the site to Ronan Harvey, a local businessman, in March 2001. As of 2023, Harvey retains ownership through his company Cotswold Airport Holding, and his daughter Suzannah Harvey is a director of two subsidiaries, Kemble Airfield Estates and Kemble Air Services . In 2021, she was described as CEO of the airport.

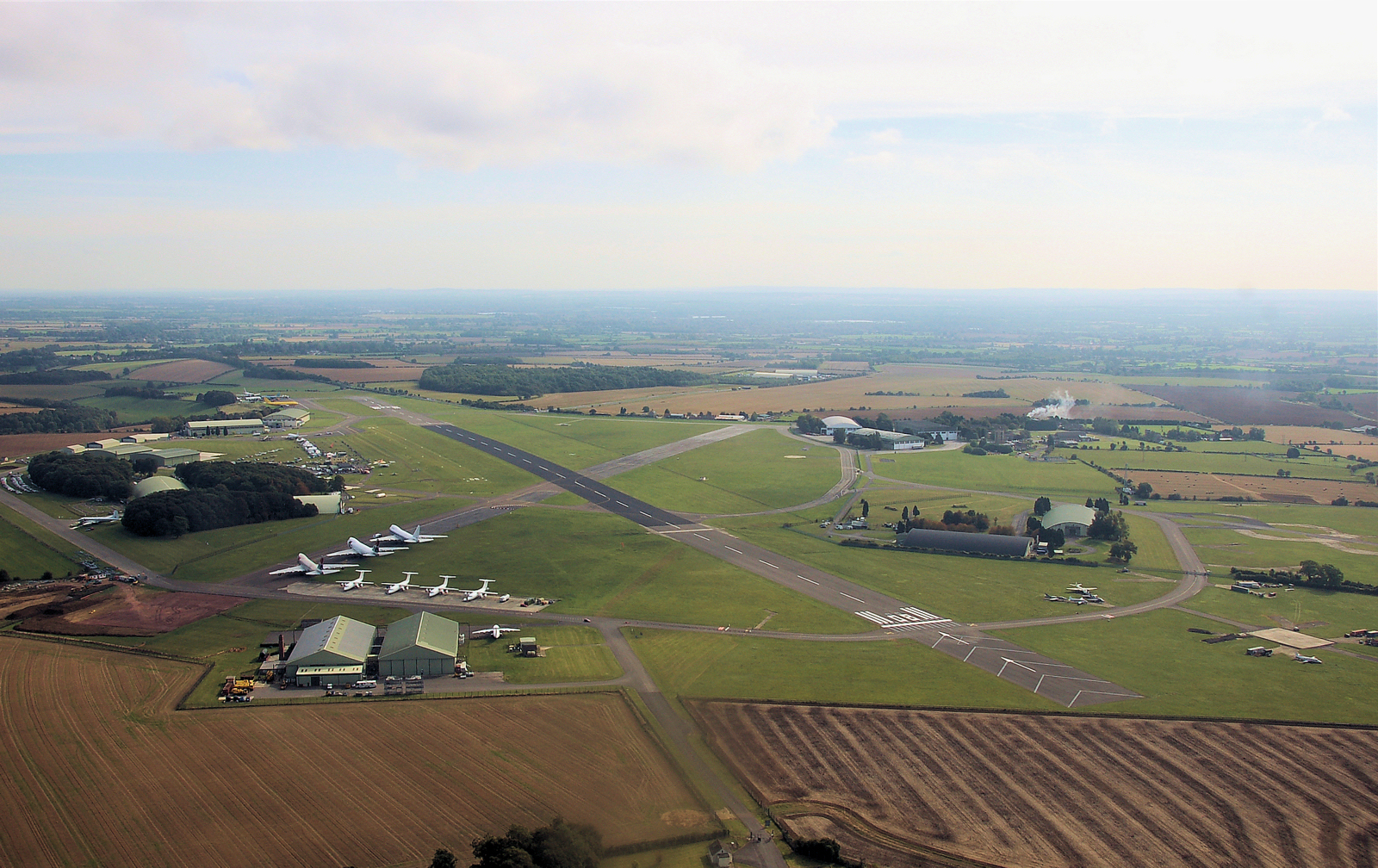
The airport, looking east

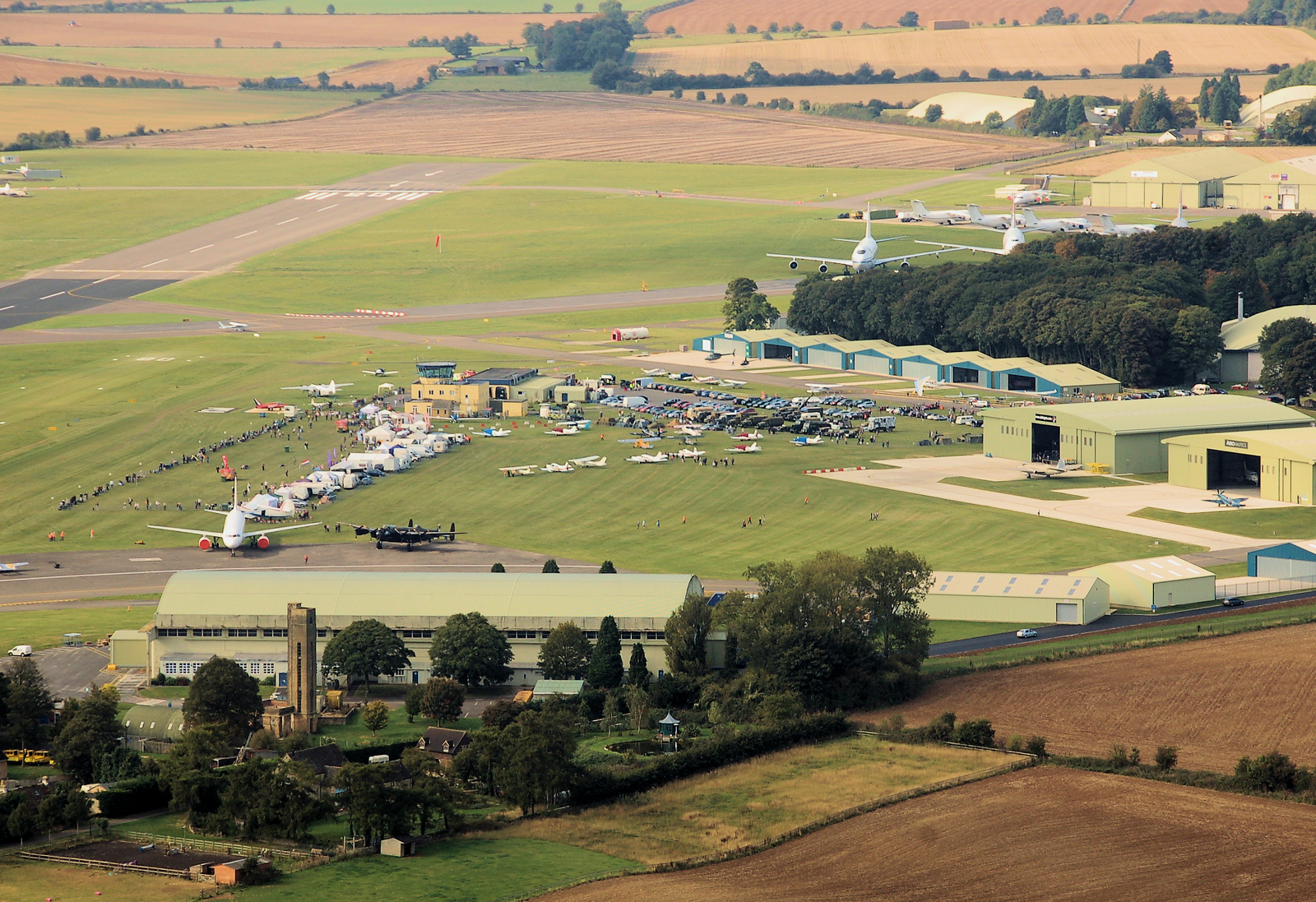
The central area of the airport, looking west

Aston Down airfield lies 3 miles (4.8 km) to the north-west. It formerly belonged to the RAF but is now used for gliding by the Cotswold Gliding Club.

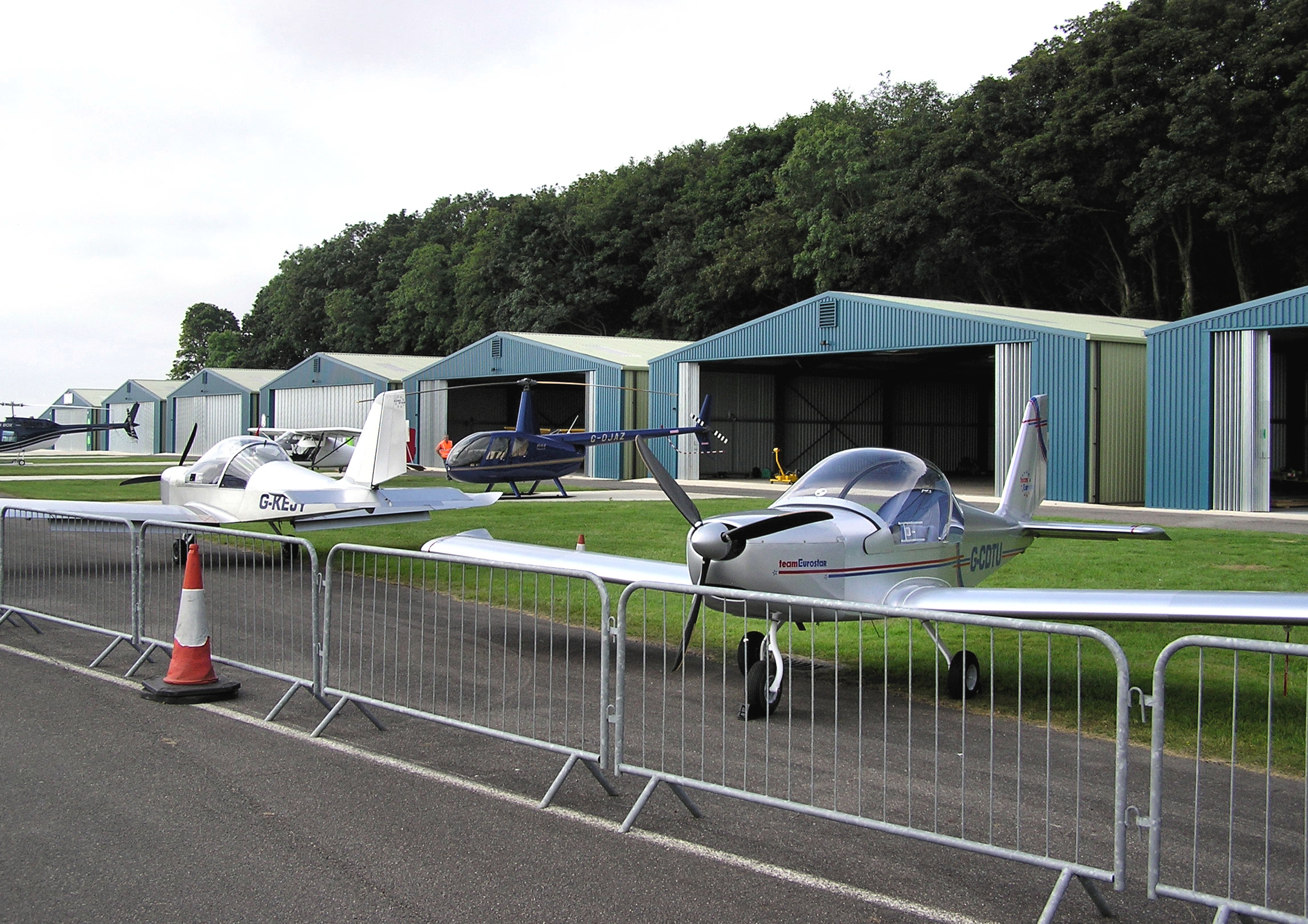
Hangars for light aircraft and helicopters

== Other uses ==
The airport is home to Chevron Aircraft Maintenance, an EASA part 145 approved aircraft maintenance facility which has been based at the airport since January 2004, carrying out maintenance, storage and dismantling of aircraft.

It is also the operating base of Air Salvage International, who describe themselves as Europe's leading aircraft decommissioning company. Air Salvage moved from Alton, Hampshire in late 2009 to Cotswold Airport, setting up base in Hangar J1. During 2010, the company took over 130,000 square feet (12,000 m^{2}) of hangar space formerly used by Aeronautic and Delta Jets, and has grown substantially thereafter. In 2017, the airport was described as "Europe's leading airliner recycling location."

Between 1996 and 2012, hangars at the airport housed the exhibits of the Bristol Aero Collection.

The airport has also been used for Formula One straight line testing, and has one of the largest race tracks for radio-controlled cars in the UK.

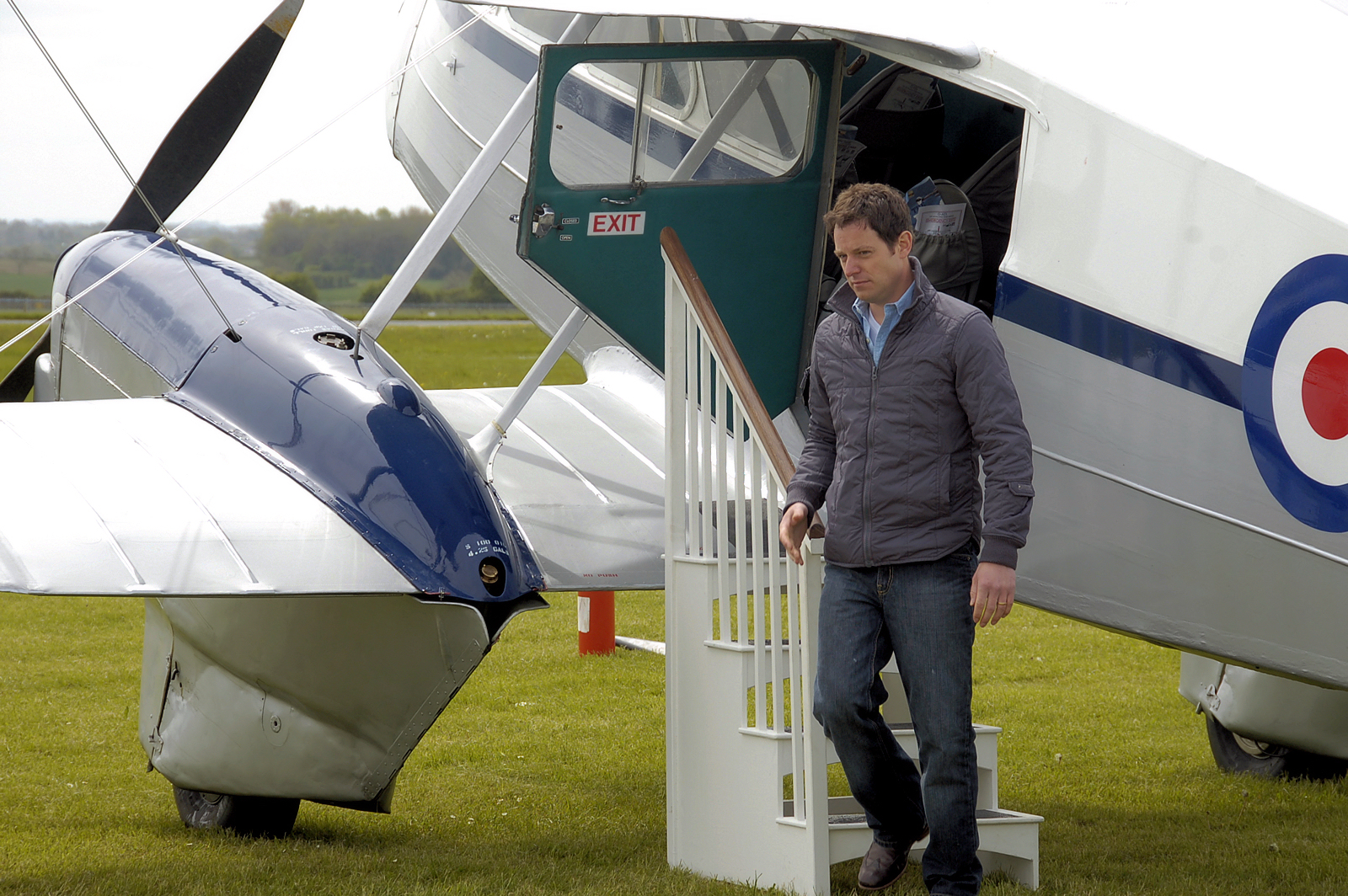
A Countryfile segment being filmed with Matt Baker at Cotswold Airport

When the airport was used by the RAF it had two hard-surface runways (13/31 and 08/26). However, the north–south runway has been closed off, and as of 2017 is used as a taxiway and for aircraft parking.

A proposal was put forward in 2015 for a "sustainable village" with shops and leisure facilities to be built on the 420-acre (170 ha) site but this did not come to fruition. As of 2018, the recently appointed airport manager, Christian Ackroyd (a former Army colonel and pilot) stated his intent to increase and diversify aviation business. This included plans for new hangars, a new GNSS (GPS) approach to enable more corporate jet use, and a Part 145 maintenance organisation based at the airport. Several buildings on the site are marketed as Cotswold Business Park, a mixed-use business park.

On 26 October 2020, the airport was announced as the preservation location for G-CIVB, a Boeing 747-400 formerly operated by British Airways in the Negus & Negus livery used by BA during the 1970s and 1980s, where it is to serve as an events location, conference site and educational airframe. This plane was purchased for one pound.

== In popular culture ==
The airport has been used as a film location for a number of television programmes and series, including Top Gear, Casualty, Ultimate Force, Car of the Year Show, Wheeler Dealers, Classic Car Club, Alex Rider, Drop the Celebrity and Fifth Gear.
