= Cotswold Gliding Club =

Coordinates: 51.712°N 2.131°W

Location of CGC at Aston Down airfield (see detailed map sources])

The Cotswold Gliding Club (CGC) is based at Aston Down airfield, between Cirencester and Stroud in Gloucestershire, South West England. The club maintains a fleet of aircraft for training purposes, and is a centre for cross-country gliding and competitions.

== History and Club Make-up ==
CGC was formed in 1964. It was initially based at Long Newnton airfield near Tetbury, but in 1967 moved to its current home, Aston Down—at that time still a military airfield. In 1980-1, with the help of Sports Council grants and other loans, the club purchased a large part of the airfield when it was auctioned off by the Ministry of Defence. Having since acquired further land, CGC now owns most of the airfield within the perimeter track.

CGC has around 150 members, as well as varying numbers of students from the University of the West of England (UWE) in Bristol, and various associated members, including both pilots (with limited flying rights) and aeromodellers, as well as social members. In 2007 the CGC widened its membership to include Blokarters.

== Airfield ==
Aston Down airfield from the south

Aston Down is, by gliding standards, a large airfield. The 1500 m main runway (about one mile) offers scope for launches of 450 to 700 m (1,500 to 2,300 ft)—and sometimes up to 900 m (3,000 ft) when the wind direction is straight down the runway. For many years most launches at Aston Down were by the reverse pulley method, but since the year 2000 the principal method of launch has been by winch. The high launches make it easy to contact the abundant thermals that rise from the well-drained Cotswold limestone to give excellent soaring conditions. Aerotow launching is increasingly available, particularly in competitions and when westerly or north-westerly winds generate lift off the Cotswold ridge (or "Edge") or wave lift downwind of the Welsh mountains.

The picture shows Aston Down taken from the south. The main (northeast-southwest) runway runs from bottom left to top right, while the shorter 1,000 m (3,300 ft) east-west runway runs left to right. The disused runway in the distance has been partly removed to allow more room for gliders landing on the grass. Blokarting and aeromodelling are restricted to the runway not currently in use for gliding (which varies according to wind direction).

== Club fleet ==
The club DG-500 being launched by winch

The club's fleet of aircraft includes two ASK-21 all-round two-seat training gliders, a DG 500 advanced cross-country trainer which can also be used for aerobatics training, and an ASK-13 two-seat trainers. An ASK-23 is available for early solo pilots, along with a Sport Vega for more advanced solo pilots. The club also has limited access to the gliders owned by UWE Gliding Club, which include another ASK-13 and a Ka8 for solo pilots. All Club gliders have similar instrumentation and are equipped with audio variometers.

== Gliding activity ==
The club operates seven days a week during the soaring season (April to September), and on Wednesdays and at weekends during the winter months. Members of the public can book trial lessons or more intensive one-day courses, as well as five-day courses. Group flying for work parties, clubs, etc takes place on Tuesday and Thursday evenings in the summer.

In 2008 the club introduced courses specifically designed to give power pilots a hands-on introduction to soaring flight.

Members receive training from the club's 30 BGA-qualified instructors. This training takes pilots to solo and well beyond—to advanced cross-country flying. Privately owned motor gliders based at Aston Down are available for club members for field landing and Cross Country Endorsement checks. During the soaring season many members fly private gliders, usually owned jointly by two or more partners. This flying takes the form of either local soaring or more ambitious cross-country flights, often covering several hundred kilometres. Some examples of recent flights by members of the club can be seen on the BGA Ladder website (2008, the last complete season, and 2009).

== Competitions ==
Competition grid at 2004 Standard Class Nationals, Aston Down

=== Aston Down ===
The excellent runway and facilities available at Aston Down make it a frequent choice for hosting regional and national gliding competitions. As early as 1962 the National Gliding Championships were held at Aston Down under the auspices of the RAF Gliding and Soaring Association, with the UK's first ever 300-km task being set. Recent competitions hosted by CGC include the following:

- 2004 Standard Class Nationals (shown on the right)
- 2004 Competition Enterprise
- 2006 15 Metre Nationals
- 2007 Inter University Task Week
- 2008 Club Class Nationals
- 2009 15 Metre Nationals
- 2010 Open Class and Standard Class Nationals
- 2011 Junior Championships
- 2013 Open Class & Standard Class Nationals
- 2015 Junior Nationals and Cotswold Regionals
- 2016 20m Multi-Seat and Standard Class Nationals
- 2017 Standard, Open, 15m & 20m Multi-Seat Nationals
- 2018 Standard, Open & 15m Nationals
- 2019 Club Class Nationals
- 2021 Junior Nationals and Cotswold Regionals
- 2022 Standard, Open & 15m Nationals
- 2023 Cotswold Regionals
- 2024 Standard, Open & 15m Class Nationals
- 2025 Junior Nationals and Cotswold Regionals
- 2025 Competition Enterprise

=== Other sites ===
Pilots from Cotswold Gliding Club regularly take part in regional and national competitions, as well as informal competitions such as:

Rockpolishers League
An informal group of six local gliding clubs who organize friendly cross-country competitions.
Two Seater Competition at Pocklington
In 2007 the club DG 500 and a private Duo Discus from Aston Down took 15th and 5th positions, respectively, out of 33 entrants. In 2011 Duo Discus 572 was placed first in the National two seater championship
Competition Enterprise
In 2008 the same two gliders also took part in this competition, which was held at North Hill in Devon.

=== Other sports ===
In 2007 Aston Down was the venue for the British Blokart Championships. In July 2008 the Cotswold Cycle Racing League held its final round at Aston Down with a 30 km race comprising six circuits of the airfield.

== Facilities ==
The original control tower houses a briefing room, club room, kitchen and residential accommodation; caravan and camping facilities are also available on site. A large hangar accommodates the club fleet, most of the private gliders owned by club members being stored in trailers or a large, modern back-to-back hangar when not being flown. There is a workshop for maintenance of aircraft, vehicles and winches. The club has built its own glider flight simulator to expand the training opportunities for club members.
