= Gerald Stapleton =

South African World War II flying ace

Basil Gerald Stapleton
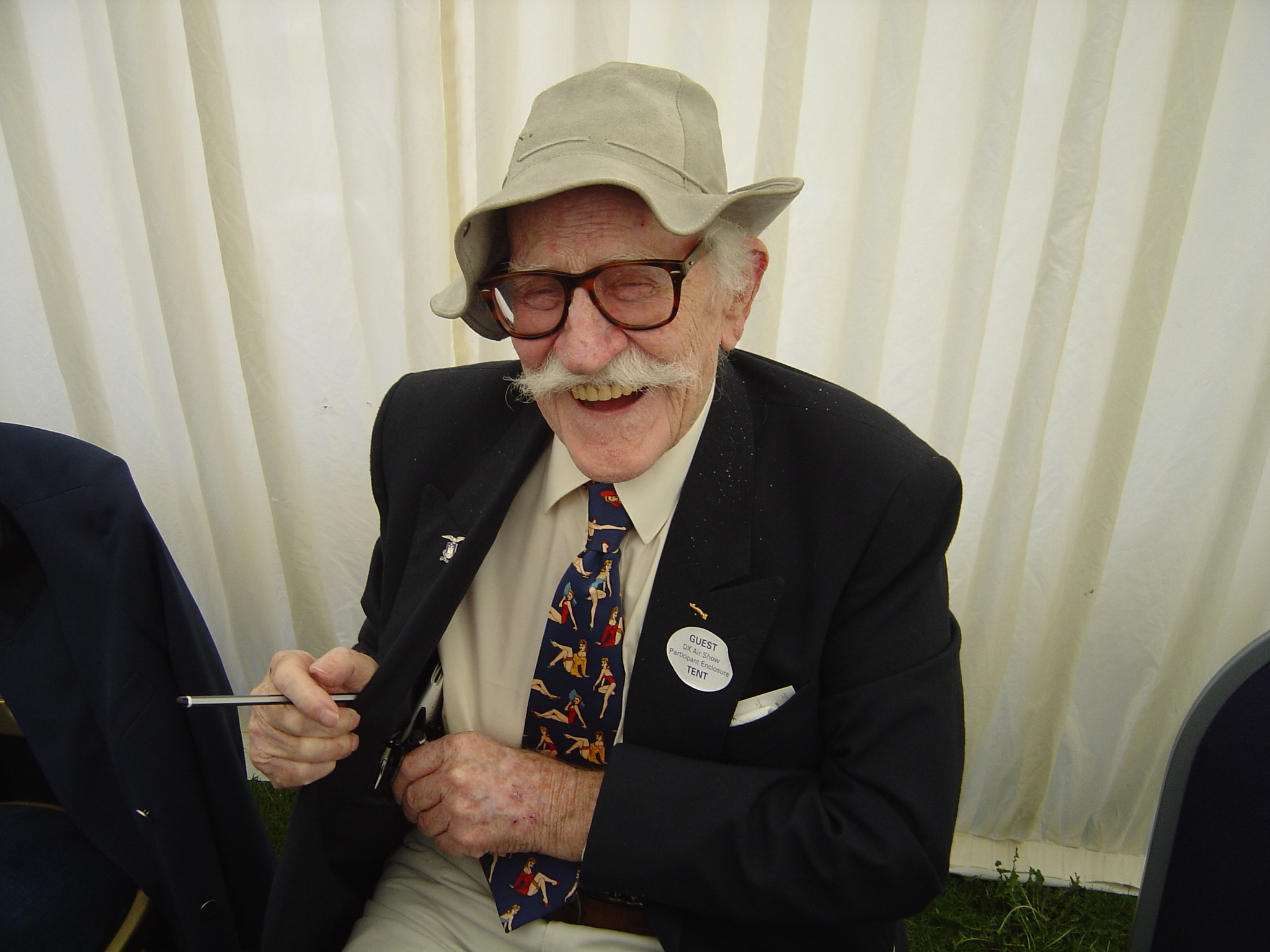
- Stapleton in 2004
- Born: 12 May 1920; Durban, Natal, Union of South Africa
- Died: 13 April 2010 (aged 89)
- Relatives: Deryck Stapleton (brother)
- Military career
- Allegiance: United Kingdom
- Branch: Royal Air Force
- Service years: 1939–46
- Rank: Squadron Leader
- Nickname: "Stapme"
- Service number: 41879
- Units: No. 603 Squadron; No. 257 Squadron
- Commands: No. 247 Squadron
- Conflicts: Second World War: Battle of Britain; Operation Market Garden
- Awards: Distinguished Flying Cross; Airman's Cross (Netherlands)
- Other work: BOAC pilot

Basil Gerald "Stapme" Stapleton, DFC (12 May 1920 – 13 April 2010) was a Royal Air Force (RAF) officer and fighter ace who flew Spitfires and Typhoons during the Second World War. He preferred the name Gerald and was nicknamed "Stapme" after a phrase used in his favourite cartoon strip Just Jake published in The Daily Mirror. His score of 6 enemy aircraft destroyed, 2 shared destroyed, 8 probably destroyed and 2 damaged, all achieved on Spitfires during the Battle of Britain, made him one of the outstanding pilots of that battle. He was revered as one of Richard Hillary's contemporaries, in whose book, The Last Enemy, he features. Without doubt he was one of the real 'characters' to survive the war and to many the quintessential image of a Battle of Britain fighter pilot, complete with handlebar moustache.

== Early life ==
Born on 12 May 1920 in Durban, Natal, Union of South Africa, Stapleton was educated in England, at King Edward VI School at Totnes, Devon.

== Military career ==
In January 1939 he signed up for a short service commission with the RAF, and following pilot training, and after a short period flying Blenheim night fighters, he was transferred to No. 603 (City of Edinburgh) Squadron at RAF Montrose, Scotland, in October 1939.

In the early months of the war, Scotland endured many German bomber raids mainly targeting the shipyards of the Clyde. On 16 October 1939, Stapleton's squadron intercepted the first German air raid on the British Isles, during which the first enemy aircraft of the Second World War were shot down. During this raid Stapleton shared two German bombers shot down in the estuary of the Firth of Forth.

=== Battle of Britain ===
For the first period of the Battle of Britain, 603 Squadron remained in Scotland. On 27 August 1940, 603 were sent south to join 11 Group based at RAF Hornchurch in Essex. This was during the critical phase of the battle, when the fighter airfields were being attacked. Pilot attrition was high, as 603 found out the next day.

Stapleton recalled:

603 Squadron arrived at Hornchurch from Scotland on 27 August and were embroiled in the action the very next day, losing three pilots killed. Pilot Officer Don Macdonald and Flight Lieutenant Laurie Cunningham died when we were bounced by 109s whilst still trying to gain a height advantage. Macdonald was on his first patrol and had only fifteen hours on Spitfires while Laurie Cunningham was experienced with over 160 hours. Neither knew what hit them. On our last patrol of the day we were bounced again and Pilot Officer Noel Benson was shot down. Almost certainly killed instantly by cannon fire, 'Broody' had over 160 hours on type. He had been so eager to get at the Germans but never had the chance. Experience didn't really count for much when you were bounced.

To avoid it happening again, the CO, Squadron Leader 'Uncle' George Denholm, employed a system of climbing on a reciprocal heading to that given by the controllers after take-off. Only when he believed they had gained sufficient altitude did they turn onto the heading given by the controllers towards the enemy but still the losses mounted.

The loss of Flying Officer Robin Waterston in combat on the 31st was a blow to the whole Squadron. He was my closest friend and the brightest character in the Squadron. We had shared sunny days with the kids at Tarfside just weeks earlier. During the day while we were airborne, our ground crew chaps had a bad time of it when Hornchurch was bombed. Four of them were killed adding to the toll. With no time to grieve we just got on with our job. We had to, we were fighting for our lives, our freedom and that of the country. Despite the casualties, today, when I look back, I recall we also had great fun. It was an exciting time and we made the most of our opportunities to live it up. We tended to treat each occasion as if it were our last

No. 603 Squadron lost 13 pilots during the summer of 1940 with many more seriously injured, most of whom were good friends of Stapleton. These included Richard Hillary on 3 September, who was shot down, badly burned and wrote his book during recovery, and on 5 September one of the flight commanders, Flight Lieutenant Fred 'Rusty' Rushmer, who was killed. But it was not all bad news as Stapleton, 603 and the RAF were scoring kills and inflicting heavy losses on the Luftwaffe.

During the same patrol in which Rusty lost his life, I managed to shoot down a Messerschmitt 109 which, unlike my first attack, was possible to confirm. During my dive from altitude I spotted a Spitfire at about 6,000 feet diving vertically, half inverted, towards the ground, its tail shot away. I then spotted a lone 109 in the same airspace as an RAF pilot descending by parachute. I latched onto the German and pursued him at low-level over the Kent countryside. As I fired short bursts he attempted to shake me off but I could see my tracer striking his aircraft and I closed in. I remember at one stage being concerned that there was a village in my line of fire. He had nowhere to go but down and eventually force-landed in a field. I flew low over the site. The German was soon apprehended, initially by the unarmed cook from the local searchlight battery!

A short time after the war Stapleton learned that the pilot was Oberleutnant Franz von Werra, whose exploits were made famous in the book and film The One That Got Away, the only German pilot PoW to escape captivity (from Canada) during World War II and return to Germany. On 7 September the Luftwaffe changed tactics and began bombing British cities. On that day, Stapleton was shot down,

I was fortunate in many ways not least of which I was never wounded and only shot down once when, on 7 September, my Spitfire was hit in combat with 109s. Having escaped the melée I managed to nurse my damaged aircraft back over the Channel, applying throttle intermittently so as not to overheat the engine, gradually losing height in the process as I neared the coast. I eventually managed to force-land in a ploughed field adjacent to a hop-garden. On climbing out of my aircraft I slid the canopy shut and turned to look for the nearest road. I spotted a couple having a picnic in the gateway to the field, their Austin Ruby saloon parked close-by. As I approached I was joined by a sergeant-pilot who had landed by parachute in a nearby orchard. The couple offered us a cup of tea and then a lift, not back to my aerodrome but to the nearest pub. What a contrast to the aerial combat in which we had been fighting for our lives just a short time before!

Gerald was awarded the Distinguished Flying Cross on 15 November 1940 and in December the unit returned to Scotland.

=== Other duties ===
Stapleton left 603 Squadron in April 1941 and served in various units, including flying 'Hurricats' (Hurricane fighters converted as catapult-launched convoy escorts) with the Merchant Ship Fighter Unit, as a flight commander with 257 Squadron, and as an instructor at Central Gunnery School before taking over Command of No. 247 (China-British) Squadron, part of 124 Wing, 2nd Tactical Air Force, flying Typhoons from beachhead code B.6, northern France in August 1944. Initially the squadron helped close the Falaise Gap but as the Allied forces moved inland, so they followed: from B.6 – Coulombs to B.68 (Amiens/Glisy), B.58 (Melsbroek) and B.78 (Eindhoven).

=== Operation Market Garden ===
No. 247 Squadron provided aerial support throughout the Arnhem campaign during Operation Market Garden.

It was a particularly intense period, moving from one makeshift airfield to another, carrying out regular ground-attack operations in support of the ground troops. Living conditions were very basic and we lived in tents most of the time when conditions were dependent on the weather. Nevertheless, we made the most of it and the spirit was good. On that note, not only did we drink the local Calvados, we also used it to fuel our Zippo lighters and hurricane lamps! During this period we lost a lot of good pilots. Attacking the Germans at low-level meant no margin for error. If you were hit you had no time to bail out. German anti-aircraft fire was almost ever-present and we were particularly vulnerable when pulling up after an attack when you became a prime target for the German gunners. After firing my rockets I tended to stay low which worked to my advantage. We also saw the carnage on the ground at close quarters. There is no glamour in war.

In January 1946 he received notification he had been awarded the Dutch DFC for his leadership of 247 Squadron throughout Operation Market Garden, conferred by Queen Wilhelmina of the Netherlands. There was no ceremony; he received the medal in the post.

=== Prisoner of war ===
On 23 December 1944 Stapleton was forced to land behind enemy lines and became a prisoner of war.

Luck finally ran out for me on 23 December 1944. As part of a force of 16 Typhoons from 247 and 137 Squadrons at Eindhoven, led by Wing Commander Kit North-Lewis, we were ordered to seek out 15-plus German tanks forcing their way into the American sector. The weather was awful and we were lucky to avoid collisions. Unable to locate the tanks we were ordered split into our individual squadrons and continue the armed reconnaissance. I spotted a train and led the attack. One of my rockets must have entered the firebox as there was a terrific explosion and my radiator was punctured as I flew through the debris. I tried to nurse my aircraft back at low level but simply ran out of height. I force-landed about 2 miles inside the German lines and was taken prisoner. I was initially taken to a rear echelon platoon HQ and from there, ironically by train, to the interrogation centre at Oberursel, near Frankfurt. I was then taken to Stalag Luft I, Barth, on the Baltic Coast where I remained until May 1945 when I was repatriated as part of Operation Exodus.

== Post-war ==
He left the RAF in April 1946 and went to work for British Overseas Airways Corporation (BOAC) flying Doves, Herons and Dakotas on the West African routes until 1948 when he returned to the United Kingdom. Later Stapleton emigrated to South Africa, where he had a number of very different jobs, including in Botswana, a country he refers to as 'God's Own'. In 1994, he returned to the UK with his wife, Audrey.

To commemorate the 50th Anniversary of the formation of the Battle of Britain Memorial Flight in 2007, for the next two seasons the Flight's Supermarine Spitfire IIa, P7350, which fought in 603 Squadron during the Battle of Britain will carry the letters XT-L, Stapleton's personal aircraft.

== Biography ==
In 2002 an authorised biography was published (co-written by David Ross) in which Stapleton recounted his wartime experiences. They both also attended many commemorative functions. Ross also wrote a biography of Richard Hillary.

== See also ==
- List of World War II aces from South Africa
- Non-British personnel in the RAF during the Battle of Britain
