= Tim Elkington =

British RAF fighter pilot (1920–2019)

Tim Elkington
- Born: John Francis Durham Elkington; 23 December 1920; Edgbaston, Birmingham, England
- Died: 1 February 2019 (aged 98); London, England
- Military career
- Allegiance: United Kingdom
- Branch: Royal Air Force
- Service years: 1939 – 1975
- Rank: Wing Commander
- Nickname: Tim
- Units: No. 1 Squadron RAF; No. 601 Squadron RAF; No. 134 Squadron RAF; No. 539 Squadron RAF; No. 197 Squadron RAF
- Conflicts: Second World War; Battle of Britain; Defence of the Soviet Arctic; Burma Campaign; Northern Ireland conflict
- Awards: 1939–1945 Star with Battle of Britain clasp; Arctic Star; Air Crew Europe Star with Atlantic clasp; Burma Star; Defence Medal; War Medal 1939–1945; General Service Medal with Northern Ireland clasp; Medal of Ushakov (Russia)
- Other work: Founder of picture-framing business

Wing Commander John Francis Durham "Tim" Elkington (23 December 1920 – 1 February 2019) was a British Royal Air Force (RAF) fighter pilot who flew during the Battle of Britain, and was one of the last surviving aircrew known as "The Few".

== Early life ==
Elkington was born in Edgbaston near Birmingham on 23 December 1920, the only child of Alan Durham Elkington and his wife Isabel Frances (née Griffin). He was educated at Hockley Heath and Bedford School.

== Military career ==
Elkington joined the Royal Air Force in September 1939 as a Flight Cadet at the Royal Air Force College Cranwell. Between October 1939 and April 1940 he trained at No. 9 Elementary Flying Training School at RAF Ansty. Elkington then undertook further training with No. 17 Service Flight Training School at RAF Cranwell. He was commissioned on 14 July 1940 and joined No. 1 Squadron RAF at RAF Northolt a day later and flew Hawker Hurricanes during the Battle of Britain. His first confirmed "kill" came on 15 August 1940, downing a Messerschmitt Bf 109.

A day later he was shot down and wounded on 16 August 1940 (research shows that he was shot down by Helmut Wick). After recuperating at the Royal West Sussex Hospital at Chichester he rejoined No. 1 Squadron on 1 October 1940 at RAF Wittering.

After a spell with No. 55 Operational Training Unit as an instructor, in late May 1941 he joined No. 601 Squadron RAF at RAF Manston. He was promoted to Flying Officer on 14 July 1941. From there he joined No. 134 Squadron RAF at RAF Leconfield in July 1941. On 12 August 1941 the squadron embarked on HMS Argus and took off from the carrier on 7 September for an airfield near Murmansk. Until mid-October 1941 Elkington took part in escorting bombers and also trained Russian pilots to fly the Hurricane. On 6 October 1941 Elkington together with Sgt. B. Barnes from the No. 134 Squadron shot down a German bomber Junkers Ju 88 over Vayenga. He returned from Russia in January 1942.

In April 1942 he joined the Merchant Ship Fighter Unit (MSFU) at RAF Speke until August 1942. After a short period with No. 1 Squadron again, in September 1942, Elkington joined No. 539 Squadron RAF at RAF Acklington flying Hurricanes alongside Douglas A-20 Havoc aircraft on night operations. He was promoted Flight Lieutenant 14 October 1942.

After 539 Squadron was disbanded in late January 1943, he joined No. 197 Squadron RAF at RAF Drem flying the Hawker Typhoon. After operations from RAF Tangmere he was posted to No. 67 Squadron RAF at Alipore, Calcutta in December 1943. When the tour expired, Elkington spent three years commanding AFDU at RAF Amarda Road and he returned home in October 1946.

== Post war ==
Elkington had a long and varied career, including a tour with an Avro Shackleton Squadron in Northern Ireland.

He was promoted to Squadron Leader in 1946 and Wing Commander in 1961. Elkington retired from the Royal Air Force on 23 December 1975.

== Later life ==
After leaving the RAF, Elkington set up an art and picture-framing business.
