= RAF Charterhall =

Former Royal Air Force base in the Borders of Scotland

RAF Charterhall
- Greenlaw, Scottish Borders in Scotland
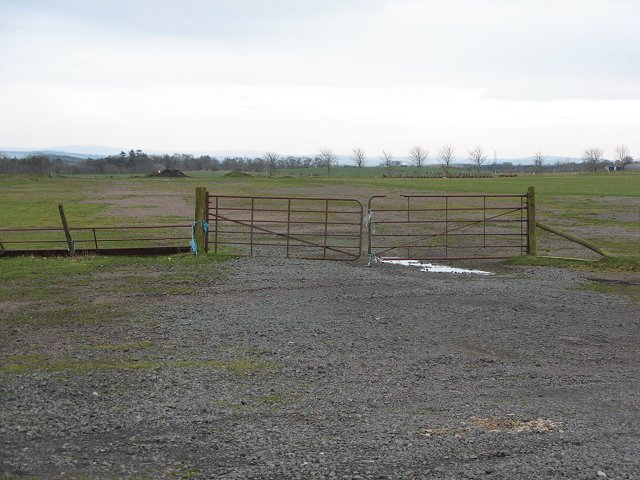
- A disused runway of RAF Charterhall taken in 2007

Site information
- Type: Royal Air Force satellite station
- Code: KH
- Owner: Air Ministry
- Operator: Royal Air Force
- Controlled by: RAF Fighter Command * No. 9 Group RAF * No. 81 (OTU) Group RAF

Location
- Location within the Scottish Borders RAF Charterhall (the United Kingdom)
- Coordinates: 55.707°N 2.376°W
- Area: 143 hectares

Site history
- Built: 19171941/42
- Built by: WW2: James Miller & Partners Ltd
- In use: 1917-1919; April 1942 – March 1946
- Battles/wars: First World War; European theatre of World War II

Airfield information
- Elevation: 112 metres (367 ft) AMSL
Runways
Direction	Length and surface
07/25	Tarmac
00/00	Tarmac

Royal Air Force Charterhall or more simply RAF Charterhall is a former Royal Air Force satellite station located in the Scottish Borders and the historic county of Berwickshire between the village of Greenlaw and Duns. It was originally a First World War landing ground named Eccles Toft. The airfield was reconstructed in 1942 and was used mainly by No. 54 Operational Training Unit during Second World War. The RAF left in 1947 and the airfield was officially closed.

The location was then left for agricultural use before becoming a motor racing track in 1952. Various forms of motorsport took place at Charterhall, including Formula Two, Formula Libre and Formula Junior with drivers such as Jim Clark, Jackie Stewart and Stirling Moss all having competed there until motor racing ceased at the airfield in 1964. However, in the recent years, the Border Ecosse Car Club have organised the "Charterhall Stages Rally" at the airfield which also ceased in 2013.

The airfield is now sometimes used as a private airstrip, however it does not have any basic maintenance or refueling facilities and its use is very limited.

== History ==
=== First World War ===
RAF Charterhall started as a first world war landing ground named RFC Eccles Tofts for No. 77 Squadron from at least the beginning of 1917. The squadron, who were based further north at Edinburgh, flew the Royal Aircraft Factory B.E.2c/d/e, B.E.12, R.E.8 reconnaissance aircraft, Airco DH.6 and Avro 504k. However, the airfield was not kept open for long and soon returned to its original state in 1919.

=== Second World War ===
The airfield was reconstructed during 1941 and opened on 30 April 1942. It was used initially for the short-term placement of trainees, one of the primary units based at Charterhall was No. 54 Operational Training Unit (OTU). The unit primarily carried out instruction on the Bristol Blenheim light bomber and the Bristol Beaufighter, some of these aircraft were fitted with aircraft interception (AI) radar and some Blenheims were dual control, these aircraft were used until 1944 when they were replaced gradually by the de Havilland Mosquito.

Many of the crews arriving at Charterhall were brought in mainly from the Commonwealth after passing their basic flying training instruction.

After No. 54 OTU left in November 1945 for RAF East Moor, a variety of fighter squadrons used the airfield flying the Supermarine Spitfires, North American Mustangs and the Gloster Meteor jet fighter before the RAF left in 1947 and closed the airfield.

As with many wartime training units, RAF Charterhall gained a reputation for having a high accident rate of the trainee crews that passed through there, suffering in the region of 2,000 accidents in 1942 alone, of which just under 200 would be fatal, earning the nickname "Slaughterhall". One such accident occurred on 8 January 1943, a Bristol Blenheim Mk V light bomber piloted by Australian Battle of Britain ace Richard Hillary, author of The Last Enemy, stalled and crashed near the runway when on approach. Hillary was retraining as a night fighter pilot after he recovered from severe burns to his face and hand after his Spitfire was shot down on 3 September 1940. Both Hillary and his observer Sergeant Wilfred Fison was killed.

The accident was probably the result of airframe ice accretion along with the difficulty the Hillary was having in controlling the aircraft due to his injuries.

A memorial to Richard Hillary, Wilfred Fison and everyone who died serving RAF Charterhall between May 1942 and May 1945 was unveiled on 6 November 2001 by the Duke of Kent.

On 19 July 2022, a Scottish temperature record of 34.8 °C was measured in this area, which would eventually be followed by 35.1 °C in Kelso, Scottish Borders

The following units were here at some point:

- No. 3 Armament Practice Station RAF (November 1945 – March 1946 & November 1946 – March 1947)
- No. 130 Squadron RAF (1945–46)
- No. 165 Squadron RAF (1945–46)
- No. 263 Squadron RAF (1946)
- No. 303 Squadron RAF (1946)
- A detachment of 770 Naval Air Squadron (1945)
- A detachment of 772 Naval Air Squadron (1945 & 1946)
- No. 2780 Squadron RAF Regiment

== Post RAF use ==
The site was equipped with two runways during the Second World War with a third one planned but never completed. These, along with the taxiways remain relatively intact. The control tower has since been demolished but two of the original hangars still remain, although in a poor state of repair.

=== Motor racing ===
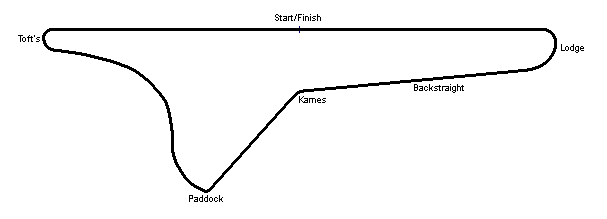
Charterhall Circuit (1952–1964)

After the RAF left in 1947, the airfield was left mainly for use in agriculture until motor racing began with the first Formula Libre race hosted on 6 April 1952, a two-mile-long (three-kilometre) track was marked out on the land using parts of the old disused runway, making a very long straight which helped overtaking manoeuvres. However, at the time, the drivers reported that the circuit was quite bumpy, although it was better than other circuits south of the border at the time.

Motor Racing continued at the airfield for twelve years, hosting numerous Formula Two and Formula Libre races and being used as a test track for the Ecurie Ecosse team. Some well-known drivers who raced there includes Roy Salvadori, Giuseppe Farina and Jim Clark. Jim Clark would spend much of his racing career at Charterhall, the location where he won his first motor race, competing in 31 events. Motor Racing Events ceased at the airfield in 1964 when the Borders and District Motor Club began organising events at the new Ingliston Racing Circuit.

From 1986, the "Charterhall Stages Rally" was organised and held at the airfield by the Border Ecosse Car Club. This event was last held on 30 March 2013.

=== Private airstrip ===
The site is still employed for minor civil use using a small unlicensed landing strip which is the most recently resurfaced part of runway 07/25. The other runway, 02/20, is unsuitable for use. Pilots landing at the airfield are also recommended to check the runway for livestock before landing as the site is also used for farming.

There is also no refueling or maintenance facilities at the site.

== See also ==
- List of former Royal Air Force stations
- List of Royal Air Force Operational Training Units
