= No. 603 Squadron RAuxAF =

Force Protection squadron of the Royal Auxiliary Air Force

No. 603 (City of Edinburgh) Squadron RAuxAF
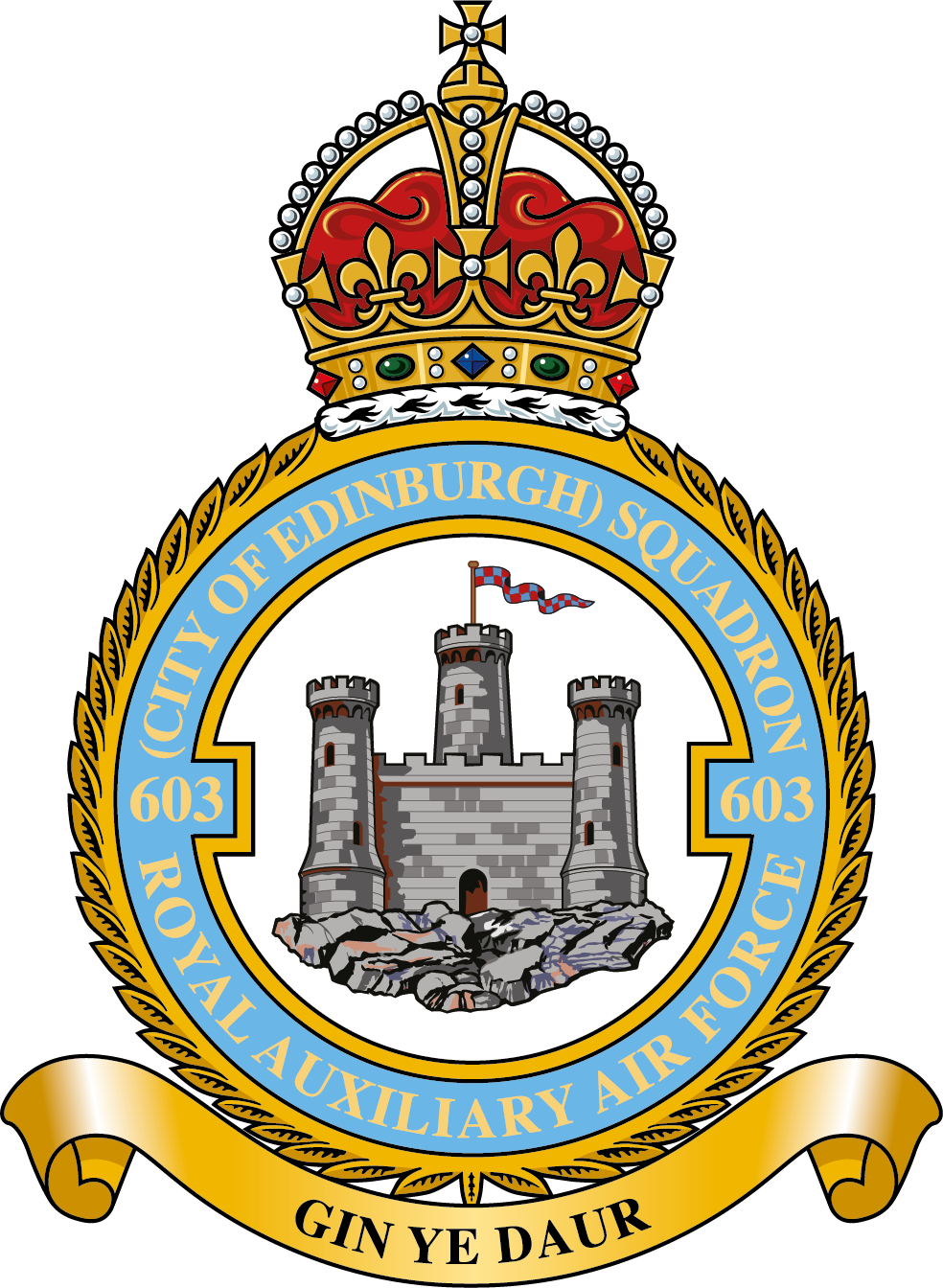
- 603 (City of Edinburgh) Squadron Royal Auxiliary Air Force badge
- Active: 14 October 1925 – 26 December 1944; 10 January – 15 August 1945; 10 May 1946 – 10 March 1957; 1 October 1999 – present
- Country: United Kingdom
- Allegiance: United Kingdom
- Branch: Royal Auxiliary Air Force
- Role: Force Protection/RAF Police and RAF Regiment
- Part of: Combat Readiness Force
- Headquarters: Learmonth Terrace, Edinburgh
- Nickname(s): City of Edinburgh
- Motto(s): Scots: Gin ye daur ("If you dare")
- Battle honours: Home Defence, 1940–42*; Battle of Britain, 1940*; Channel & North Sea, 1941*; Fortress Europe, 1941*; Malta, 1942*; Mediterranean, 1943*; Sicily, 1943*; South-East Europe, 1943–44*; France & Germany 1945; Honours marked with an asterisk* are those emblazoned on the Squadron Standard

Commanders
- Current commander: Sqn Ldr Scottie Rankin (Aug 25)
- Honorary Air Commodore: Alexander Douglas-Hamilton, 16th Duke of Hamilton
- Notable commanders: Queen Elizabeth II was the Royal Honorary Air Commodore until her death on 8 September 2022; George Douglas-Hamilton, 10th Earl of Selkirk; Lord David Douglas-Hamilton; Christopher Foxley-Norris

Insignia
- Squadron Badge heraldry: On a rock a triple-towered castle, flying therefrom to the sinister a pennon The castle in the badge is similar to that in the Arms of the City of Edinburgh
- Squadron Codes: RL (April 1939 – September 1939); XT (September 1939 – April 1942, January 1945 – August 1945, 1949 – April 1951); RAJ (May 1946 – 1949)

No. 603 (City of Edinburgh) Squadron is a squadron of the Royal Auxiliary Air Force, based in Edinburgh, Scotland. On reforming on 1 October 1999, the primary role of 603 Squadron was as a Survive to Operate squadron, as well as providing force protection.

603 Sqn re-roled to become a reserve RAF Police unit from 1 April 2013. The Squadron retains a squadron's complement of RAF Regiment as part of its overall contribution to Force Protection and it still operates from a magnificent Victorian Town Mansion close to Edinburgh's city centre, as it has since the Town Headquarters was bought for the squadron in 1925.

== History ==
=== Formation and early years ===
No. 603 Squadron was formed on 14 October 1925 at RAF Turnhouse as a day bomber unit of the Auxiliary Air Force. Originally equipped with DH.9As and using Avro 504Ks for flying training, the squadron re-equipped with Wapitis in March 1930, these being replaced by Harts in February 1934. On 24 October 1938, No. 603 was redesignated a fighter unit and flew Hinds until the arrival of Gladiators at the end of March 1939.

=== Second World War ===
In August 1939, the squadron began to transition to Spitfires. As war approached the squadron was put on a full-time footing, and within two weeks of the outbreak of the Second World War, Brian Carbury was permanently attached and the squadron began to receive Spitfires, passing on its Gladiators to other squadrons during October.

==== On Spitfires ====
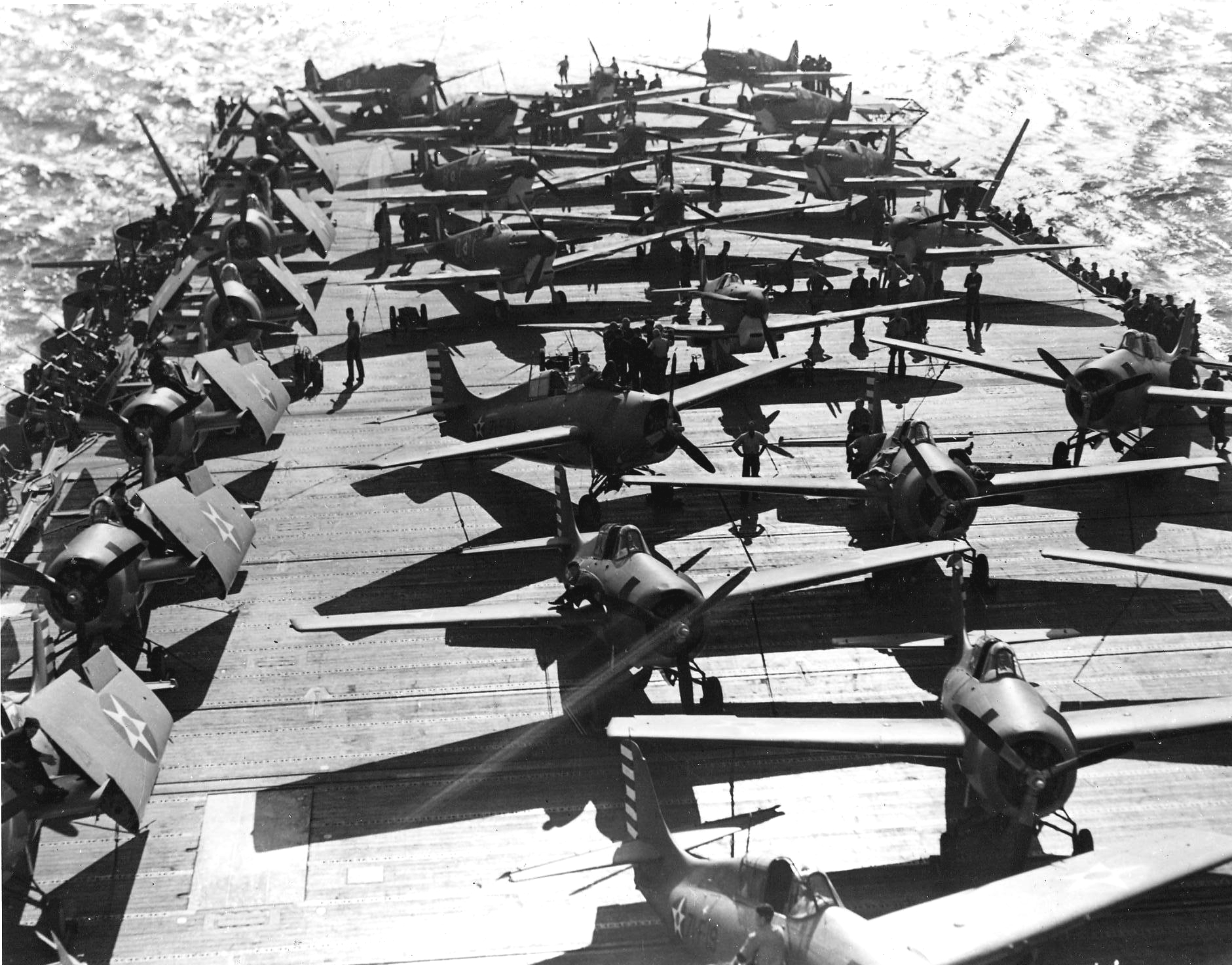
603 Sqn Spitfires and U.S. Navy Wildcats on USS Wasp (CV-7), 19 April 1942.

Scotland was in range of Nazi Germany's long-range bombers and reconnaissance aircraft. The Luftwaffe's main operations being mainly against the Royal Naval Home Fleet anchored in Scapa Flow. The squadron was operational with Spitfires in time to intercept the first German air raid on the British Isles on 16 October, when it shot down a Junkers Ju 88 bomber into the Firth of Forth north of Port Seton – the first enemy aircraft to be shot down over Great Britain since 1918, and the first RAF victory in the Second World War. It remained on defensive duties in Scotland until 27 August 1940, when it moved on rotation to Southern England, based with No 11 Group at RAF Hornchurch, where it was operational from 27 August 1940 for the remaining months of the Battle of Britain.

Two days after the squadron became operational in southern England, Carbury claimed the first of his 15½ victories, becoming the fifth highest scoring fighter ace of the battle. He was awarded the Distinguished Flying Cross and Bar with 603 Squadron during the battle. P/O R. 'Ras' Berry claimed some 9 (of an eventual total of 14) victories during this time, while P/O 'Sheep' Gilroy claimed over 6 victories. Plt Off Richard Hillary (5 victories) was shot down on 3 September in combat with Bf 109s of Jagdgeschwader 26 off Margate at 10:04hrs – rescued by the Margate lifeboat, he was severely burned and spent the next three years in hospital, during which time he wrote a book, The Last Enemy. By the end of the Battle of Britain, according to more recent academic research including the scrutiny of German records, 603 Squadron were identified as the highest-scoring Battle of Britain fighter squadron.

Returning to Scotland at the end of December, Carbury damaged a Ju 88 on Christmas Day over St Abb's Head, before leaving squadron in January 1941 as an instructor at the Central Flying School. In May 1941, the squadron moved south again to take part in sweeps over France (termed "rhubarbs"), until the end of the year.

After a further spell in Scotland, No. 603 left in April 1942 for the Middle East where its ground echelon arrived early in June. Concurrently, Flt Sgt Joe Dalley moved from the squadron to PRU duties and flew a Spitfire PR direct from RAF Benson to Malta, joining No. 69 Squadron RAF to become one of four pilots known as the "Eyes and Ears" on the Island. The squadron's aircraft were embarked on the U.S. aircraft carrier Wasp and flown off to Malta on 20 April to reinforce the island's beleaguered fighters. After nearly four months defending Malta, the remaining pilots and aircraft were absorbed by 229 Squadron on 3 August 1942.

==== On Beaufighters ====
At the end of June 1942, No. 603's ground echelon had moved to Cyprus, where it spent six months as a servicing unit before returning to Egypt. In February 1943, Bristol Beaufighters and crews arrived to begin convoy patrols and escort missions along the North African coast and in August sweeps over German held islands in the Aegean and off Greece began. Attacks on enemy shipping continued until the lack of targets enabled the squadron to be returned to the UK in December 1944.

==== Spitfires again ====
On 10 January 1945, No. 603 reassembled at RAF Coltishall and by curious coincidence, took over the Spitfires of No. 229 Squadron RAF and some of its personnel, the same squadron which had absorbed No. 603 at Ta' Qali in 1942. Fighter-bomber sweeps began in February over the Netherlands and continued until April, when the squadron returned to its home base at Turnhouse for the last days of the war. On 15 August 1945, the squadron was disbanded.

=== Post war ===
603 Sqn reformed as a unit of the Auxiliary Air Force on 10 May 1946 and began recruiting personnel to man a Spitfire squadron during June at RAF Turnhouse. Receiving its first Spitfire in October, it flew this type until conversion to De Havilland Vampire FB.5s in May 1951. By July it was completely equipped and the type was flown until disbandment on 10 March 1957.

== Present role ==
The new 603 Squadron was formed from No. 2 (City of Edinburgh) Maritime Headquarters Unit (MHU) in October 1999. It was used to provide the basis for the new No. 602 (City of Glasgow) Squadron RAuxAF in 2006 while 603 remained in Edinburgh. To commemorate the 50th Anniversary of the formation of the Battle of Britain Memorial Flight in 2007, for the next 2 seasons the Flight's Supermarine Spitfire IIa, P7350, which fought in 603 Sqn during the Battle of Britain carried the 603 Squadron letters XT-L, those of Gerald 'Stapme' Stapleton's personal aircraft.

For a number of years up until 2013 the primary trade available at 603 Sqn was RAF Regiment although the Squadron also supported small numbers in the Mission Support and Flight Operations trades, However, in late 2012 it was announced that during 2013 the squadron would begin recruiting for RAF Police and the Squadron is now primarily a RAF Police unit, with an embedded Flight of RAF Regiment.

== Aircraft operated ==
Aircraft operated by no. 603 Squadron RAuxAF, data from
From	To	Aircraft	Version
October 1925	March 1930	Airco DH.9	DH.9A
October 1925	March 1930	Avro 504	504.K (used for flying training)
March 1930	March 1934	Westland Wapiti	Mk.I
February 1934	February 1938	Hawker Hart	
February 1938	March 1939	Hawker Hind	
October 1938	August 1939	Gloster Gladiator	Mk.II
August 1939	November 1940	Supermarine Spitfire	Mk.I
October 1940	May 1941	Supermarine Spitfire	Mk.IIa
May 1941	December 1941	Supermarine Spitfire	Mk.Va
August 1941	March 1942	Supermarine Spitfire	Mk.Vb
April 1942	August 1942	Supermarine Spitfire	Mk.Vc
February 1943	November 1943	Bristol Beaufighter	Mks.Ic and If
February 1943	October 1943	Bristol Beaufighter	Mk.VIc
August 1943	October 1943	Bristol Beaufighter	Mk.XI
October 1943	December 1944	Bristol Beaufighter	Mk.TFX
January 1945	August 1945	Supermarine Spitfire	LF.16e
1945	1945	Taylorcraft Auster	Mk.I (Communications flight)
June 1946	1953	North American Harvard	T.2B
October 1946	June 1948	Supermarine Spitfire	LF.16e
February 1948	July 1951	Supermarine Spitfire	F.22
1951	November 1955	De Havilland Vampire	FB.3
May 1951	March 1957	De Havilland Vampire	FB.5
May 1951	March 1957	Gloster Meteor	T.7 (used for flying training)
1956	March 1957	De Havilland Vampire	T.11 (used for flying training)
June 1956	January 1957	De Havilland Vampire	FB.9 (2 aircraft, WL518 and WG841)

== Commanding officers ==
Officers commanding no. 603 Squadron RAF, data from
From	To	Name
1 August 1925	14 April 1931	Sqn Ldr J.A. McKelvie, AFC
14 April 1931	1 April 1934	Sqn Ldr H. Murray-Philipson, MP
1 April 1934	1 April 1938	Sqn Ldr Lord G.N. Douglas-Hamilton, AFC
1 April 1938	4 June 1940	Sqn Ldr E.H. Stevens
4 June 1940	1 April 1941	Sqn Ldr G.L. Denholm, DFC
1 April 1941	25 July 1941	Sqn Ldr F.M. Smith
25 July 1941	17 October 1941	Sqn Ldr M.J. Loudon
17 October 1941	18 December 1941	Sqn Ldr R.G. Forshaw
18 December 1941	20 July 1942	Sqn Ldr Lord D. Douglas-Hamilton
20 July 1942	3 August 1942	Sqn Ldr W.A. Douglas
10 April 1942	4 June 1942	Sqn Ldr P. Illingworth (Officer commanding Ground Party)
3 August 1942	28 January 1943	Sqn Ldr F.W. Marshall
28 January 1943	1 December 1943	Wg Cdr H.A. Charter
1 December 1943	15 June 1944	Wg Cdr J.R.H. Lewis, DFC
15 June 1944	2 August 1944	Wg Cdr J.T.D. Revell
2 August 1944	23 September 1944	Sqn Ldr C.D. Paine (Acting)
23 September 1944	26 December 1944	Wg Cdr C.N. Foxley-Norris
10 January 1945	26 January 1945	Sqn Ldr E.H.M. Patterson, DFC
26 January 1945	1 April 1945	Sqn Ldr T.C. Rigler, DFC, DFM
1 April 1945	15 August 1945	Sqn Ldr H.R.P. Pertwee, DFC
11 June 1946	23 September 1949	Sqn Ldr G.K. Gilroy, DSO, DFC
23 September 1949	1 December 1950	Sqn Ldr J.W.E. Holmes, DFC, AFC
1 December 1950	22 March 1953	Sqn Ldr P.J. Anson, DFC
23 March 1953	25 August 1953	Sqn Ldr R.L.R. Davies, DFC
25 August 1953	9 May 1956	Sqn Ldr R. Schofield
9 May 1956	10 March 1957	Sqn Ldr M.E. Hobson, AFC
1 October 1999	2006	Wg Cdr A.J. Beaton
2006	1 March 2010	Sqn Ldr D Morrison QVRM AE
1 March 2010	29 February 2012	Sqn Ldr J D Rodgers
1 March 2012	14 October 2018	Sqn Ldr J J Riley
15 October 2018	30 June 2019	Sqn Ldr A Liggat
1 July 2019	1 March 2020	Flt Lt C Loughlin RAF (Acting)
2 March 2020	TBC	Sqn Ldr D Read RAuxAF
TBC	Present	Flt Lt J Young RAF (Acting)

=== Notable personnel ===
- Flt Lt Brian Carbury DFC*, who claimed 15½ victories with No. 603, making him the fourth-highest scoring ace of the Battle of Britain
- Flight Lieutenant Richard Hillary, Spitfire pilot who was shot down on 3 September 1940, was badly burned, and wrote a book The Last Enemy.
- Squadron Leader B. G. 'Stapme' Stapleton who shot down Franz von Werra, who became the only German PoW to escape and return to the Third Reich.
- Flight Lieutenant George Gilroy, became a flying ace during the Battle of Britain

== Freedom of the City of Edinburgh ==
After a vote by the council in February 2018, Lord Provost of Edinburgh Frank Ross presented The Freedom of the City of Edinburgh to the Squadron at the City Chambers on Tuesday 3 July 2018. The Parade was followed by a private reception in the Palace of Holyroodhouse where the Squadron was hosted by its Royal HAC, Queen Elizabeth.

== The Queen's Platinum Jubilee ==
With the Queen as the Squadron's Royal Honorary Air Commodore, the Squadron was tasked with providing personnel to join the RAF detachment that made up part of the military parade as part of the Queen's Platinum Jubilee Pageant parade on Sunday 5 June 2022.

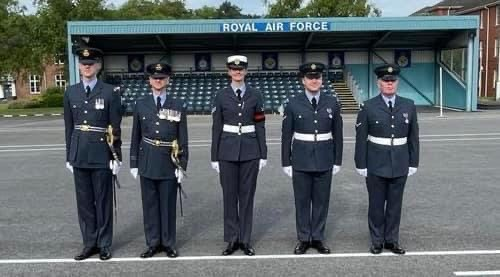
Queen's Platinum Jubilee Parade - No1 Uniform

== See also ==
- List of Royal Air Force aircraft squadrons
