= George Denholm =

Scottish fighter pilot and flying ace

George Lovell Denholm
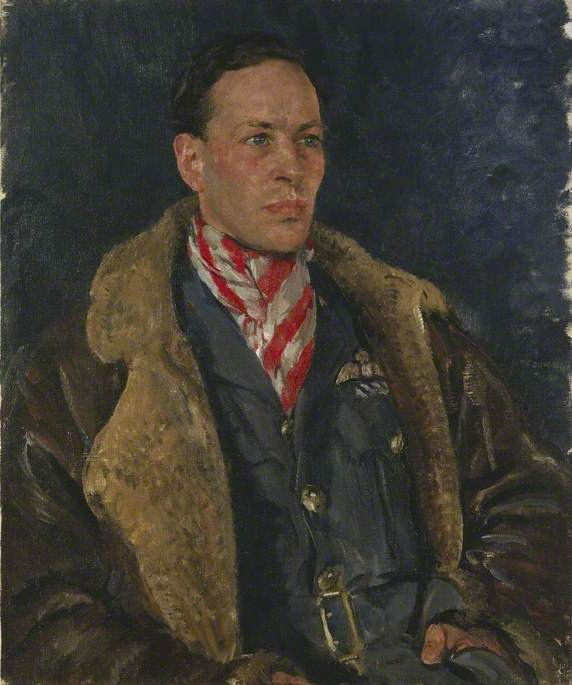
- Denholm in 1940, by Thomas Cantrell Dugdale
- Born: 20 December 1908; Bo'ness, West Lothian
- Died: 15 June 1997 (aged 88); Bo'ness, West Lothian
- Military career
- Allegiance: United Kingdom / British Empire
- Branch: Royal Air Force
- Service years: 1933–1947
- Rank: Group Captain
- Nickname: Uncle
- Service number: 90190
- Commands: RAF North Weald (c.1944–45); No. 605 Squadron (1942–43); No. 1460 Flight (1941–42); No. 603 Squadron (1940–41)
- Conflicts: Second World War: Battle of Britain
- Awards: Distinguished Flying Cross; Mentioned in Despatches; King Haakon VII Freedom Cross (Norway)

Group Captain George Lovell "Uncle" Denholm, DFC (20 December 1908 – 15 June 1997) was a Scottish fighter pilot and flying ace of the Royal Air Force during the Second World War. He flew Spitfires during the Battle of Britain, and is counted amongst the ranks of 'The Few'.

== Early life ==
Denholm was born at Tidings Hill in Bo'ness, West Lothian, the son of a coal exporters and pit-prop/timber importer. He attended Cargilfield Preparatory School and Fettes College, and later studied law at St John's College, Cambridge.

At Cambridge, he joined the University Cadet Corps. In 1933, Denholm took an interest in planes and joined No. 603 (City of Edinburgh) Squadron of the Royal Auxiliary Air Force. He took flight training on Airco DH.9A biplanes at RAF Macmerry and RAF East Fortune in East Lothian. In August 1939, Denholm was drafted as a flight commander to 603 Squadron at RAF Drem.

== RAF career ==
=== RAF Drem ===
By the start of the Second World War, Denholm had converted to fly the new Mk.I Spitfire. It was whilst on combat patrol in his Spitfire on 16 October 1939 that he shared in the shooting down of a Heinkel He 111 (which was attempting to bomb the Forth Railway Bridge) near Port Seton in East Lothian. It was the first German bomber to be shot down over Great Britain in the Second World War. On 12 March 1940 he damaged a Dornier Do 17 off the coast near Aberdeen.

Due to Denholm being 32 at the time, and much older than other pilots in the squadron he was nicknamed "Uncle George".

=== Battle of Britain ===
With the Battle of Britain in full swing in the summer of 1940, Denholm's squadron was transferred to RAF Hornchurch in southern England. Flying regular bomber interception sorties, Denholm claimed a probable He 111 on 26 June and shared Junkers Ju 88 on 3 July, plus a Messerschmitt Bf 109 destroyed and another probable on 28 August. On 30 August, whilst in combat with Bf 110s over Snargate in Kent he was shot down but managed to bail out.

Two days later (1 September 1940), Denholm was back in action, and claimed a Bf 109 damaged. On 15 September claimed two Do 17's and a single Bf 109 damaged. However, it was during this sortie that he himself was shot down. His Spitfire crashed at Warren Farm, Fairlight, East Sussex, but he came down safely at Guestling.

Another damaged Bf 109 was claimed by Denholm on 18 September and on 27 September. He shared a Bf 109 destroyed (plus a probable Bf 109 and a shared probable Bf 109). On 20 October 1940 he damaged another Bf 109.

On 22 October 1940 acting Squadron Leader Denholm was awarded the DFC. His citation in the London Gazette read:

Since the commencement of hostilities, Squadron Leader Denholm has led his squadron, flight or section in innumerable operational patrols against the enemy. His magnificent leadership has contributed largely to the success of the squadron, which has destroyed fifty-four enemy aircraft in about six weeks; four of these aircraft were destroyed by Squadron Leader Denholm himself.

On 11 November he shot down and destroyed a Bf 109, and on 29 November he shot down another Bf 110.

In April 1941, he relinquished command of No. 603 Squadron and was posted as Fighter Controller to the Operations Room at RAF Turnhouse in Edinburgh. On 10 May 1941, Denholm was on duty when Rudolf Hess's Bf 110 was intercepted over Scotland and the Reich Deputy Führer was arrested.

=== Later commands ===
In mid-December 1941 Denhom was posted as commander of No. 1460 Flight RAF at RAF Acklington with Turbinlite searchlights fitted to British Douglas Havoc night fighters. He latter remarked that the experiment was a great success.

In March 1942 he was posted as commander of No. 605 Squadron RAF at RAF Ford. The squadron was equipped with de Havilland Mosquito fighter-bombers and were tasked in the run up to D-Day in June 1944 with strafing enemy positions in the Pas-de-Calais area and throughout northern France. Low flying was a perilous activity and the squadron suffered many losses.

Denholm subsequently became the Station Commander at RAF North Weald, where Norwegian and Danish squadrons operated. He developed a close friendship with the Norwegian Commanding Officer, Helge Mehre, and Denholm accompanied him at the end of the war to receive the German surrender in Norway at Gardermoen outside Oslo.

Denholm's last 'kill' came on 11 March 1943 when he shot down an unidentified enemy aircraft over Gilze-Rijen in the Netherlands. In January 1945 he was awarded a Mention in Despatches and stayed with the RAF until discharged in 1947 as a group captain.

=== Richard Hillary ===
Denholm had been Richard Hillary's senior commander at No. 603 Squadron, and Hillary had written about how highly regarded "Uncle George" was in his 1943 memoir The Last Enemy. Hillary had been severely burnt after bailing out of a plane but managed to get back into active service. However, on 18 January 1943 he was killed along with his navigator when their Bristol Blenheim crashed during a night training exercise. Following the cremation of Hillary's body at Golders Green, it was Denholm who scattered his ashes over the English Channel.

== Air combat record ==
Denholm ended the war an ace, claiming 6 confirmed destroyed (4 destroyed and 4 shared), 3 probables, 1 shared probable and 5 damaged.

Claim	Date	Squadron	Enemy aircraft	Notes
Shared	16 October 1939	No. 603 Squadron	He 111	Port Seton, East Lothian
Damaged	13 March 1940	No. 603 Squadron	Do 17	Off coast near Aberdeen
Probable	26 June 1940	No. 603 Squadron	He 111	
Share	3 July 1940	No. 603 Squadron	Ju 88	
Destroyed	28 August 1940	No. 603 Squadron	Bf 109	
Probable	28 August 1940	No. 603 Squadron	Bf 109	
Damaged	1 September 1940	No. 603 Squadron	Bf 109	
Damaged	15 September 1940	No. 603 Squadron	Bf 109 and two Do 17s	
Damaged	18 September 1940	No. 603 Squadron	Bf 109	
Shared	27 September 1940	No. 603 Squadron	Bf 109	
Probable	27 September 1940	No. 603 Squadron	Bf 109	
Shared probable	No. 603 Squadron	No. 64 Squadron	Bf 109	
Damaged	20 October 1940	No. 603 Squadron	Bf 109	
Destroyed	11 November 1940	No. 603 Squadron	Bf 109	
Destroyed	29 November 1940	No. 603 Squadron	Bf 110	
Destroyed	11 March 1943	No. 605 Squadron	Unknown	

== Post war ==
After the war Denholm returned to the family shipping agency, John Denholm & Co Ltd, based in Bo’ness and later Grangemouth. This firm was separate from the larger shipping and logistics company J & J Denholm (The Denholm Group), with which he is sometimes incorrectly associated in secondary sources. In the 1950s he served briefly on Bo’ness Municipal Council. He married Betty Tooms in 1939. They had two sons and two daughters.
