= George Gilroy (RAF officer) =

British flying ace of WWII

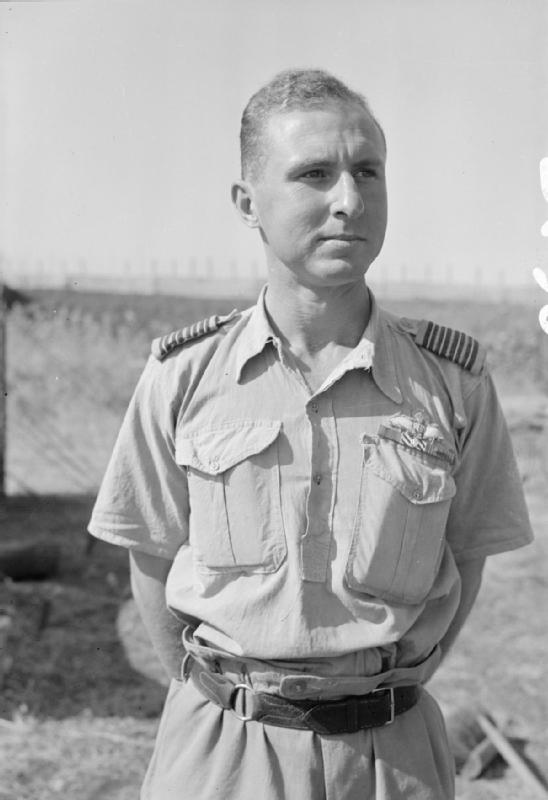
- Gilroy in 1943, when he was commander of No. 324 Wing
- Born: 1 June 1914; Edinburgh, Scotland
- Died: 25 March 1995 (aged 80)
- Military career
- Allegiance: United Kingdom
- Branch: Royal Air Force; Royal Auxiliary Air Force
- Service years: 1939–1945 (RAF); 1938–1939; 1946–1949 (RAuxAF)
- Rank: Group Captain
- Commands: No. 609 Squadron; No. 324 Wing; RAF Wittering; RAF Blakelaw
- Conflicts: Second World War: Battle of Britain; Circus offensive; Tunisian campaign; Invasion of Sicily
- Awards: Distinguished Service Order; Distinguished Flying Cross & Bar; Mention in despatches Distinguished Flying Cross (United States); Croix de Guerre (Belgium)

George Gilroy, DSO, DFC & Bar (1 June 1914 – 25 March 1995) was a British flying ace who served in the Royal Air Force (RAF) during the Second World War. He was credited with having shot down at least twenty-four aircraft.

Born in Edinburgh, Gilroy was working as a sheep farmer when he joined the Royal Auxiliary Air Force (RAuxAF) in 1938. He was called up for service in the RAF on the outbreak of the Second World War, serving with No. 603 Squadron, he flew in the Battle of Britain and achieved a number of aerial victories during this time. Awarded the Distinguished Flying Cross near the end of the battle, he later was involved in the Circus offensive. From July 1941 he commanded No. 609 Squadron until the following May, at which time he was rested. He returned to operations in late 1942 with a posting to East Africa before going on to lead a fighter wing in the Tunisian campaign and the subsequent Allied invasion of Sicily. Awarded the Distinguished Service Order, he subsequently returned to England and his later war service was spent as commander of RAF stations in England, during which time he was awarded the United States Distinguished Flying Cross. After the war he returned to sheep farming but also served in the RAuxAF for a time. He died in 1995, aged 80.

== Early life ==
George Kemp Gilroy was born on 1 June 1914 in Edinburgh, Scotland. He commenced sheep farming when he completed his schooling. He joined the Royal Auxiliary Air Force (RAuxAF) in 1938, and was commissioned as an acting pilot officer in No. 603 Squadron on 10 November. Based at Turnhouse, the squadron was operating the Gloster Gladiator fighter at the time of Gilroy's commissioning, but the following year was one of the earliest fighter units to operate the Supermarine Spitfire.

== Second World War ==
Just before the outbreak of the Second World War, Gilroy was called up for service with the Royal Air Force (RAF). No. 603 Squadron was involved in one of the RAF's earliest actions against the Luftwaffe, when several pilots, including Gilroy, were scrambled on 16 October 1939 to intercept Heinkel He 111 medium bombers attacking Royal Navy vessels in the Firth of Forth. His Spitfire was lightly damaged in the engagement. He was credited with a share in the shooting down of a He 111 over the Firth of Forth on 28 October. Early the following year, the squadron moved to Dyce and on 19 January, he shared in the destruction of a He 111 to the east of Aberdeen. Combining with four other pilots on 7 March, he destroyed another He 111 some 70 miles (110 km) from Aberdeen.

The squadron moved to Drem in April and then the following month back to Turnhouse. On 3 July he shared in the shooting down of a Junkers Ju 88 medium bomber to the south of Aberdeen and this was followed three days with the shared destruction of a Dornier Do 215 medium bomber about 100 miles (160 km) to Aberdeen's east. Another He 111 was shot down by Gilroy in combination with two other pilots over Aberdeen on 12 July. He damaged a He 111 near Peterhead on 24 July.

=== Battle of Britain ===
In late August No. 603 Squadron went south to England, and was stationed at Hornchurch. Gilroy was quickly in action, shooting down a Messerschmitt Bf 109 fighter over Kent on 28 August. Three days later, he destroyed another but was subsequently shot down himself. He bailed out of his Spitfire over London but once he reached the ground, was not recognised as a RAF pilot and attacked by a mob. Injured before calm could be restored, he had to be hospitalised at King George Hospital, in Ilford. He did not rejoin his squadron until 17 September. In the interim, he was awarded the Distinguished Flying Cross (DFC).

Gilroy shot down a Bf 109 near Kenley on 28 October. The following month, on 21 November, he shared in the destruction of a He 111 near Faversham. In early December, the squadron was sent north to Drem for a period of rest. Here he was injured in an accident on 17 December, when a Spitfire making a landing at the airfield collided with his own aircraft. His wounds required extensive medical treatment so he did not return to operations until February 1941. During his convalescence, he was mentioned in despatches in the 1941 New Years Honours.

=== Circus offensive ===
In May No. 603 Squadron returned to Hornchurch; it flew in the Circus offensive as part of the Hornchurch Wing, carrying out sweeps and bomber escorts to France. At this time, it started to re-equip with the new Spitfire Mark VB. Gilroy, promoted to acting flight lieutenant, was now commanding one of the squadron's flights. He damaged Bf 109s over northern France on 21 June and 8 July; a further Bf 109 was damaged over the English Channel on 12 July. The following week he was promoted to acting squadron leader and appointed commander of No. 609 Squadron. This unit, also using Spitfire Mark VBs, had a significant contingent of Belgian pilots and was based at Gravesend where it was involved in the Circus offensive. Gilroy, who received a substantive promotion to flight lieutenant the previous month, shot down a pair of Bf 109s on 27 October.

On 8 November, Gilroy destroyed a Bf 109 over northeast France, his final aerial victory of the year as No. 609 Squadron moved to Digby later that month. It remained there for several months, during which time it was heavily engaged in training. In early March 1942, Gilroy was awarded the Croix de Guerre by the Government of Belgium. Later in the month the squadron returned to operations with a posting to Duxford and started patrolling duties and sweeps to France. On one of these, carried out on 8 March, Gilroy damaged a Focke-Wulf Fw 190 fighter. The following month it started converting to the new Hawker Typhoon fighter although it continued to use Spitfires on operations and on 15 Gilroy destroyed a Fw 190 over Le Touquet. In May Gilroy was rested from operations and soon afterwards was awarded a Bar to his DFC; the citation, published in The London Gazette, read:

Since this officer was awarded the Distinguished Flying Cross in July, 1940, he has destroyed an additional 7 enemy aircraft and damaged a further 2, making a total of 10 destroyed and 4 damaged. Under his command his squadron has met with considerable success in the destruction of enemy aircraft. He is a first class fighter pilot and an excellent leader.

— London Gazette, No. 35605, 23 June 1942

=== North Africa ===
Gilroy returned to operations in November as a wing leader in East Africa, commanding No. 325 Wing. His tenure was brief for at the end of the month, he was given command of No. 324 Wing, which operated Spitfires in the Tunisian campaign. With another pilot he damaged a Ju 88 on 30 November, and a week later damaged a Bf 109 together with two other pilots. On 16 December the wing caught several Bf 109s on the ground, and Gilroy shared in the destruction of three of these. His final aerial victories of the year were on 28 December, to the south of Pont du Fahs, when he destroyed two of what he believed were Ju 88s but were actually Henschel Hs 129 ground-attack aircraft.

On 2 January 1943, over Pont du Fahs itself, Gilroy shot down a Bf 109 and this was followed on 11 January with a share in a destroyed Bf 109. He shot down another Bf 109 near Bou Arada on 18 January. Ten days later he was involved in a collision with another Spitfire when taking off from Souk-el-Khemis Airfield. Gilroy, slightly injured, bailed out but the other pilot, Edward Mortimer-Rose, was killed. Resuming flying duties, on 23 February Gilroy shared in the probable destruction of one Bf 109 and damaging of another near Kasserine. He was awarded the Distinguished Service Order the following month.

Gilroy shot down a Bf 109 in the vicinity of Medjez el Bab on 3 April. Later in the month, on 22 April, he shared in the destruction of what was claimed to be a Junkers Ju 52 transport aircraft to the northeast of Cap Bizerta but was actually the similar looking Fiat G.12 transport. Two days later he destroyed another Bf 109 in the Bou Arada area. On the first day of May, he combined with four other pilots to shoot down a He 111 to the west of Plane Island. Four days afterwards, he damaged a Bf 109, his final claim in the Tunisian campaign which ended on 13 May with the surrender of Axis forces in North Africa.

=== Later war service ===
With the end of the fighting in North Africa, attention now shifted to Italy and the forthcoming invasion of the island of Sicily. Gilroy led his wing to Malta on 12 June where it was to be based at Hal Far, carrying out sweeps to Sicily. At this time, Gilroy's command included Nos. 43, 72, 93, 111 and 243 Squadrons. On the day of the invasion itself, Gilroy led the wing twice on patrols as it provided cover for the landing beaches for the Allies, unsuccessful engaging a Macchi C.20 fighter on the second. Four days later he and another pilot together probably destroyed a Ju 88 over Catania, one of a number of bombers sighted by the patrol he was leading. He shot down a Macchi C.200 fighter on 4 September near Messina although this was subsequently identified as a Reggiane Re.2002 fighter.

Gilroy returned to the United Kingdom in November 1943 and was promoted to acting group captain. He was appointed the station commander at the RAF's airfield at Wittering. His wing commander rank was made substantive in January 1944. He later commanded the RAF station at Blakelaw and in November was awarded the United States Distinguished Flying Cross "in recognition of valuable services rendered in connection with the war".

Gilroy ended the war credited with having shot down twenty-four aircraft, ten of which being shared with other pilots. He was also credited with shares in two aircraft probably destroyed, nine aircraft damaged, four of which were shared.

== Later life ==
Gilroy left the service of the RAF at the end of the war, and returned to sheep farming. He subsequently returned to the RAuxAF as a squadron leader. When No. 603 Squadron was reestablished at Turnhouse in 1946, Gilroy was appointed its commander but it did not reach full operational capacity until the following year. He relinquished command in September 1949 and returned to sheep farming. He died on 25 March 1995; his remains were cremated and the ashes scattered over Table Mountain in Cape Town, South Africa.
