= No. 1460 Flight RAF =

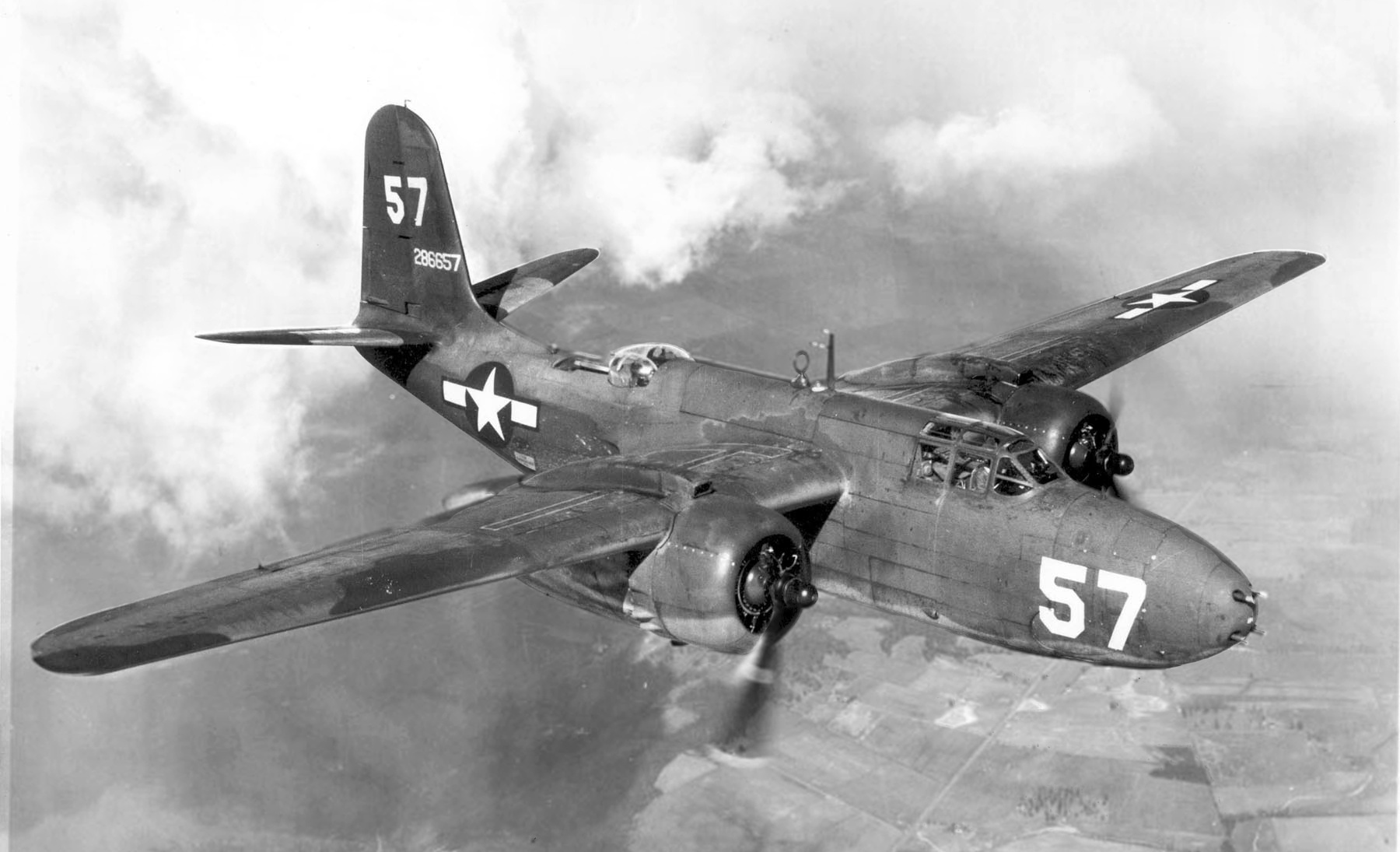
- An A-20 Havoc of the USAAF, like the ones used by the flight
- Active: 15 Dec 1941 – 2 Sep 1942
- Country: United Kingdom
- Branch: Royal Air Force
- Role: Night Fighter (Turbinlite)
- Part of: No. 13 Group RAF, Fighter Command

Insignia
- Squadron Badge heraldry: No known badge
- Squadron Codes: No known identification code for the flight is known to have been carried

No. 1460 (Fighter) Flight was formed at RAF Acklington on 15 December 1941, equipped with Turbinlite Douglas Boston and Douglas Havoc aircraft. The flight became operational in May 1942 and made its first and only contact with the enemy in June of that year. On operations they cooperated first with the Hawker Hurricanes of 43 Squadron and later with those of 1 Squadron. The flight was replaced with 539 Squadron on 2 September 1942 but officially disbanded as late as 23 January 1943.

539 Squadron, which had taken over the men and machines, carried on flying the Turbinlite Bostons and Havocs until the system was abandoned on 25 January 1943, when Turbinlite squadrons were, due to lack of success on their part and the rapid development of AI radar, thought to be superfluous.

== Aircraft operated ==
Aircraft operated by no. 1460 Flight RAF, data from
| From | To | Aircraft | Version |
|---|---|---|---|
| 15 December 1941 | 2 September 1942 | Douglas Havoc | Mk.I |
| 15 December 1941 | 2 September 1942 | Douglas Havoc | Mk.I (Turbinlite) |
| 15 December 1941 | 2 September 1942 | Douglas Boston | Mk.I |
| 15 December 1941 | 2 September 1942 | Douglas Boston | Mk.II (Turbinlite) |
| 15 December 1941 | 2 September 1942 | Douglas Boston | Mk.III (Turbinlite) |

== Flight bases ==
Bases and airfields used by no. 1460 Flight RAF, data from
| From | To | Base |
|---|---|---|
| 15 December 1941 | 2 September 1942 | RAF Acklington, Northumberland |

== Commanding officers ==
Officers commanding no. 1460 Flight RAF, data from
| From | To | Name |
|---|---|---|
| 15 December 1941 | March 1942 | S/Ldr. G.J. Denholm, DFC |
| March 1942 | 2 September 1942 | S/Ldr. J.S. Morton, DFC |
