= Edward Mortimer-Rose =

British flying ace of WWII

- Born: 1920; Littleport, Cambridgeshire, United Kingdom
- Died: 28 January 1943 (aged 22–23); Souk-el-Khemis Airfield, Tunisia
- Burial place: Medjez-el-Bab War Cemetery, Tunisia
- Military career
- Allegiance: United Kingdom
- Branch: Royal Air Force
- Service years: 1939–1943
- Rank: Flight Lieutenant
- Commands: No. 249 Squadron; No. 185 Squadron
- Conflicts: Second World War: Battle of Britain; Circus offensive; Siege of Malta; Tunisian campaign
- Awards: Distinguished Flying Cross & Bar; Mention in despatches

Edward Mortimer-Rose, DFC & Bar (1920 – 28 January 1943) was a flying ace who served in the Royal Air Force (RAF) during the Second World War. During his service with the RAF, he was credited with having destroyed at least thirteen German aircraft.

Born in Littleport, Mortimer-Rose joined the RAF in early 1939. Once his training was completed, he was posted to No. 234 Squadron. He flew in the Battle of Britain and the Circus offensive of 1941, during which he claimed a number of aerial victories. He was sent to Malta in December 1941 and took command of No. 249 Squadron during the siege of that island. He was wounded towards the end of the month and spent several weeks in hospital before returning to duty in February 1942 as commander of No. 185 Squadron. Rested from operations in May, he later served with No. 111 Squadron in the Tunisian campaign. He was killed in a flying accident when his Supermarine Spitfire fighter collided with another aircraft while taking off from an airfield in Tunisia.

== Early life ==
Edward Mortimer-Rose was born in 1920 at Littleport in Cambridgeshire, the United Kingdom. He attended Haileybury School and once his education was completed, he joined the Royal Air Force on a short-service commission. He commenced his initial training in February 1939 before proceeding to No. 6 Flying Training School at Little Rissington two months later as an acting pilot officer. His flight training was completed in November, by which time the Second World War had broken out.

== Second World War ==
Mortimer-Rose was posted to No. 234 Squadron on 6 November. This was a newly formed fighter squadron based at Leconfield and working towards operational status with Bristol Blenheim heavy fighters. In March 1940, it began to re-equip with the Supermarine Spitfire fighter and two months later became operational, by which time it was based at Church Fenton. The following month the squadron moved to St. Eval as part of No. 10 Group, and then onto Middle Wallop. It subsequently became drawn into Fighter Command's efforts to defend against the Luftwaffe campaign against southern England.

=== Battle of Britain ===
Mortimer-Rose made his first claim for an aerial victory on 8 August, for a share in a Junkers Ju 88 medium bomber that was probably destroyed in the region of Falmouth. A week later he shot down a Messerschmitt Bf 110 heavy fighter to the southwest of Swanage. In the afternoon of 18 August, what is now known as The Hardest Day, No. 234 Squadron was scrambled to intercept a Luftwaffe raid on Gosport. Mortimer-Rose destroyed a Messerschmitt Bf 109 fighter that was escorting Junkers Ju 87 dive bombers attacking Gosport. He engaged a second Bf 109 but ran out of ammunition; this Bf 109 was deemed to have been probably destroyed.

On 26 August Mortimer-Rose destroyed a Bf 109 to the south of the Isle of Wight. The squadron's losses by this time saw it withdrawn back to St. Eval from where it saw out the final weeks of the Battle of Britain at a lowered operational tempo, with fewer sorties. Flying from here on 9 October, he shared in the probable destruction of a Ju 88 south of Falmouth. Another Ju 88 was claimed as probably destroyed by Mortimer-Rose over Land's End on 26 October. He shared in the shooting down of a Dornier Do 17 medium bomber near St. Eval on 24 November. He damaged another Do 17 on 20 December to the south of Land's End and on Christmas Day he damaged a Ju 88 near Falmouth.

=== Circus offensive ===
Mortimer-Rose damaged a Ju 88 near St. Eval on 11 February 1941. Later in the month No. 234 Squadron moved to Warmwell, where it began to re-equip with the Spitfire Mk IIa and changed duties; while it still carried out defensive patrols, it also started to undertake offensive operations over occupied France and Belgium as part of the RAF's Circus offensive. On 11 March, some 20 miles (32 km) to the southwest of Portland, Mortimer-Rose shared in the destruction of a Bf 110. A few days later, he was mentioned in despatches in March.

On 23 March Mortimer-Rose shared in damaging a Do 17 over the Isle of Wight. Early the following month, on 2 April, he probably destroyed a Ju 88 to the southwest of Lyme Regis. He damaged a Do 17 near Portland on 8 May. Shortly afterwards the squadron began to receive new Spitfire Mk Vbs and flying one of these on 19 May, Mortimer-Rose destroyed a pair of Bf 109s over the English Channel. His successes over the previous several months was recognised with an award of a Distinguished Flying Cross (DFC) in early June. The published citation read:

This officer has displayed great skill as a fighter pilot. In a recent combat he destroyed two of five enemy aircraft destroyed by his flight thus bringing his victories to at least six. He has set a splendid example and has contributed materially to the high standard of efficiency in his squadron.

— London Gazette, No. 35183, 6 June 1941

On 17 June Mortimer-Rose shared in the destruction of a Bf 109 near Cherbourg. The following month, on 14 July, he destroyed one Bf 109 and damaged a second, also in the vicinity of Cherbourg. He damaged a pair of Bf 109s off Le Havre on 15 October.

=== Siege of Malta ===
In November Mortimer-Rose was posted to the Middle East and soon after his arrival in Egypt, was sent to Malta as an acting squadron leader to assume command of No. 249 Squadron. This was based at Ta Kali and operated Hawker Hurricane fighters, defending the island from the bombing raids mounted by the air forces of Germany and Italy. A few days after his arrival on Malta on 6 December, he was awarded a Bar to his DFC. The published citation read:

This officer is a relentless and inspiring fighter pilot. He has participated in every operational sortie undertaken by his squadron and, many times, has carried out individual attacks in enemy occupied country with great success. Flight Lieutenant Mortimer-Rose has destroyed at least 7 and damaged a further 9 enemy aircraft.

— London Gazette, No. 35378, 12 December 1941

He made his first claim with his new unit on 19 December, when he destroyed a Ju 88 over Malta. He shared in the destruction of another Ju 88 on 24 December. The day after Christmas, he was wounded in an engagement and crash landed his Hurricane on the airstrip at Luqa. His wounds, to his feet, required hospitalisation and it was not until late February 1942 that he returned to duty as commander of No. 185 Squadron. This was another Hurricane-equipped unit on Malta, based at Hal Far. He destroyed a pair of Bf 110s over the island on 21 March and this was followed two days later with shares in three damaged Ju 88s. The next day he was injured when the airfield at Hal Far was bombed. In May he was taken off operations.

In January 1943, Mortimer-Rose, having reverted to his substantive rank of flight lieutenant, was posted to No. 111 Squadron as one of its flight commanders. The squadron was serving in the Tunisian campaign at the time of his arrival. On 28 January he was involved in a collision with another Spitfire when taking off from Souk-el-Khemis Airfield. While the other pilot, Wing Commander George Gilroy, was slightly injured and successfully bailed out, Mortimer-Rose was killed.

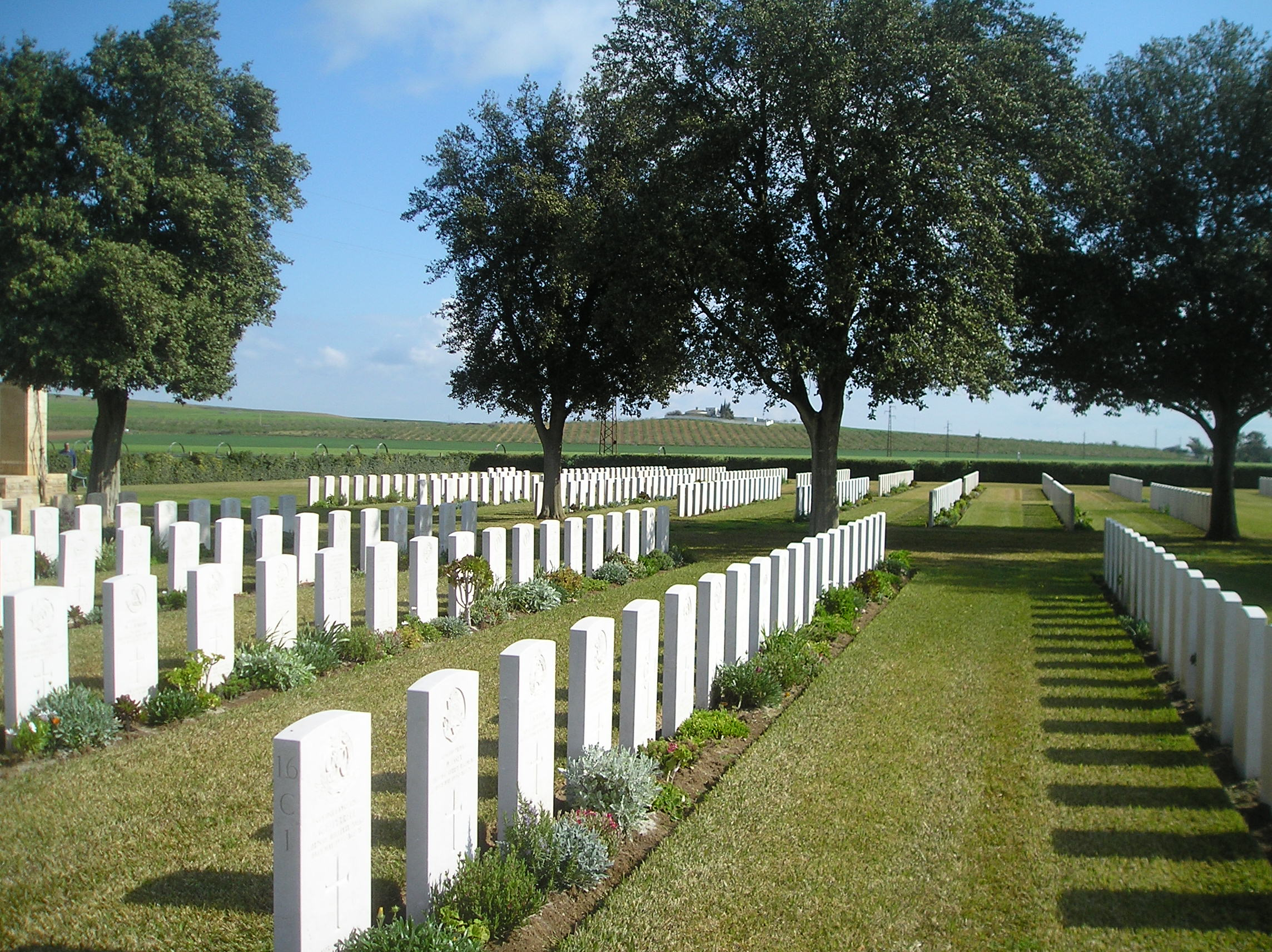
Mortimer-Rose is buried in Medjez-El-Bab War Cemetery, in Tunisia

His remains were interred at the Medjez-El-Bab War Cemetery in Tunisia. He is credited with the destruction of at least thirteen aircraft, four of which shared with other pilots. He is also credited with three aircraft probably destroyed, and shares in a further two probables. Additionally, he damaged eleven aircraft although six of these were shared.
