= Richard Hillary =

Australian flying ace (1919–1943)

Richard Hope Hillary
- Born: 20 April 1919; Sydney, Australia
- Died: 8 January 1943 (aged 23) near Greenlaw, Scotland
- Military career
- Allegiance: United Kingdom, British Empire
- Branch: Royal Air Force
- Service years: 1939–1943
- Rank: Flight Lieutenant
- Unit: No. 603 Squadron RAF
- Conflicts: Second World War; Battle of Britain

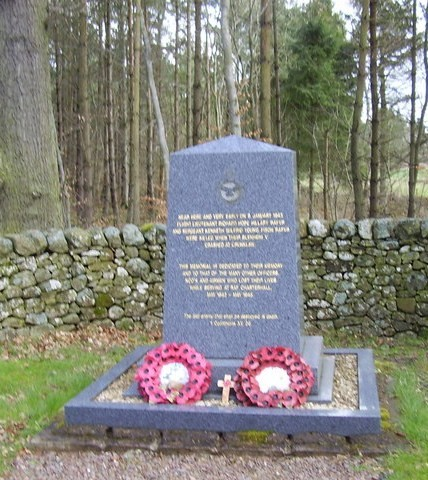
Memorial to Richard Hillary and his crew at the site of the former RAF Charterhall, near Greenlaw, Berwickshire.

Flight Lieutenant Richard Hope Hillary (20 April 1919 – 8 January 1943) was an Anglo-Australian Royal Air Force fighter pilot during the Second World War. He wrote the book The Last Enemy about his experiences during the Battle of Britain.

== Early life ==
Hillary was the son of an Australian government official and his wife (Michael and Edwyna Hillary) and was sent to England to be educated at Shrewsbury School and Trinity College, Oxford. He lived with his parents until the age of seven; from then until he was eighteen he saw them only during the summer holidays. Whilst at Oxford it has been claimed that he was secretary of the Oxford University Boat Club and president of the Rugby Club, but both claims are questionable. He rowed in the successful Trinity College VIII of 1938. He joined the Oxford University Air Squadron and the Royal Air Force Volunteer Reserve in 1939. Hillary was a descendant of Sir William Hillary, founder of the Royal National Lifeboat Institution.

== Second World War ==
Hillary was called up to the Royal Air Force in October 1939 and in July 1940, having completed his training, he was posted to B Flight, No. 603 Squadron RAF, located at RAF Montrose, flying Spitfires. The Squadron moved south to RAF Hornchurch on 27 August 1940 and immediately saw combat. In one week of combat Hillary personally claimed five Bf 109s shot down, claimed two more probably destroyed and one damaged.

Hillary wrote about his first experience in a Supermarine Spitfire in The Last Enemy:

The Spitfires stood in two lines outside 'A' Flight pilots' room. The dull grey-brown of the camouflage could not conceal the clear-cut beauty, the wicked simplicity of their lines. I hooked up my parachute and climbed awkwardly into the low cockpit. I noticed how small was my field of vision. Kilmartin swung himself on to a wing and started to run through the instruments. I was conscious of his voice, but heard nothing of what he said. I was to fly a Spitfire. It was what I had most wanted through all the long dreary months of training. If I could fly a Spitfire, it would be worth it. Well, I was about to achieve my ambition and felt nothing. I was numb, neither exhilarated nor scared. I noticed the white enamel undercarriage handle. "Like a lavatory plug," I thought. Kilmartin had said, "See if you can make her talk." That meant the whole bag of tricks, and I wanted ample room for mistakes and possible blacking-out. With one or two very sharp movements on the stick I blacked myself out for a few seconds, but the machine was sweeter to handle than any other that I had flown. I put it through every manoeuvre that I knew of and it responded beautifully. I ended with two flick rolls and turned back for home. I was filled with a sudden exhilarating confidence. I could fly a Spitfire; in any position I was its master. It remained to be seen whether I could fight in one.

On 3 September 1940 he had just made his fifth "kill" when he was shot down by a Messerschmitt Bf 109 flown by Hauptmann Helmuth Bode of II./JG 26:

I was peering anxiously ahead, for the controller had given us warning of at least fifty enemy fighters approaching very high. When we did first sight them, nobody shouted, as I think we all saw them at the same moment. They must have been 500 to 1,000 feet above us and coming straight on like a swarm of locusts. I remember cursing and going automatically into line astern; the next moment we were in among them and it was each man for himself. As soon as they saw us they spread out and dived, and the next ten minutes was a blur of twisting machines and tracer bullets. One Messerschmitt went down in a sheet of flame on my right, and a Spitfire hurtled past in a half-roll; I was weaving and turning in a desperate attempt to gain height, with the machine practically hanging on the airscrew. Then, just below me and to my left, I saw what I had been praying for – a Messerschmitt climbing and away from the sun. I closed in to 200 yards, and from slightly to one side gave him a two-second burst: fabric ripped off the wing and black smoke poured from the engine, but he did not go down. Like a fool, I did not break away, but put in another three-second burst. Red flames shot upwards and he spiralled out of sight. At that moment, I felt a terrific explosion which knocked the control stick from my hand, and the whole machine quivered like a stricken animal. In a second, the cockpit was a mass of flames: instinctively, I reached up to open the hood. It would not move. I tore off my straps and managed to force it back; but this took time, and when I dropped back into the seat and reached for the stick in an effort to turn the plane on its back, the heat was so intense that I could feel myself going. I remember a second of sharp agony, remember thinking "So this is it!" and putting both hands to my eyes. Then I passed out.

Unable to bail out of the flaming aircraft immediately, Hillary sustained extensive burns to his face and hands. Before it crashed he fell out of the stricken Spitfire unconscious. Regaining his senses whilst falling through space, he deployed a parachute and landed in the North Sea, where he was subsequently rescued by lifeboat Lord Southborough (ON 688) from the Margate Station.

Hillary was taken for medical treatment to the Royal Masonic Hospital, Hammersmith, London; and afterwards, under the direction of the surgeon Archibald McIndoe, to the Queen Victoria Hospital, East Grinstead, in Sussex. He endured three months of repeated surgery in an attempt to repair the damage to his hands and face, and went on to become one of the best known members of McIndoe's "Guinea Pig Club". He wrote an account of his experiences, published in 1942 under the title Falling Through Space in the United States, and as The Last Enemy in Great Britain.

Gradually I realized what had happened. My face and hands had been scrubbed and then sprayed with tannic acid. [...] My arms were propped up in front of me, the fingers extended like witches' claws, and my body was hung loosely on straps just clear of the bed.

Shortly after my arrival at the Masonic the Air Force plastic surgeon, A. H. McIndoe, had come up to see me. [...] Of medium height, he was thick-set and the line of his jaw was square. Behind his horn-rimmed spectacles a pair of tired friendly eyes regarded me speculatively.

"Well," he said, "you certainly made a thorough job of it, didn't you?" He started to undo the dressings on my hands and I noticed his fingers – blunt, capable, incisive. By now all the tannic had been removed from my face and hands. He took a scalpel and tapped lightly on something white showing through the red granulating knuckle of my right forefinger. "Bone," he remarked laconically. He looked at the badly contracted eyelids and the rapidly forming keloids, and pursed his lips. "Four new eyelids, I'm afraid, but you're not ready for them yet. I want all this skin to soften up a lot first."

This time when the dressings were taken down I looked exactly like an orang-outang. McIndoe had pinched out two semicircular ledges of skin under my eyes to allow for contraction of the new lids. What was not absorbed was to be sliced off when I came in for my next operation, a new upper lip.

In 1941, Hillary persuaded the British authorities to send him to America to rally support for Britain's war effort. While in the United States, he spoke on the radio, had a love affair with the actress Merle Oberon, and drafted much of The Last Enemy.

Hillary managed to bluff his way back into a flying position even though, as was noted in the officers' mess, he could barely handle a knife and fork. He returned to service with No 54 Operational Training Unit at RAF Charterhall near Berwick-upon-Tweed after recovering from his injuries, for a conversion course to pilot night fighter aircraft.

== Death ==
Hillary was killed in his 24th year on 8 January 1943, along with Navigator/Radio Operator Sgt. Wilfred Fison, when he crashed a Bristol Blenheim night fighter during a night training flight in adverse weather conditions, the aircraft coming down on farmland in Berwickshire, Scotland.

A funeral took place at St Martin-in-the-Fields, London, on 25 January 1943 at 12:30pm, followed by the cremation of his body at Golders Green Crematorium, where he is commemorated on the Commonwealth War Graves Commission memorial. His ashes were scattered from a Douglas Boston over the English Channel by his former 603 Squadron commanding officer, Wing Commander George Denholm.

== Commemoration ==
In 2001 a memorial to Hillary was unveiled at the site of the former RAF Charterhall near Greenlaw, Berwickshire.

His love affair with Mary Booker, which lasted from December 1941 until his death, was the subject of Michael Burn's book Mary and Richard (1988).

He is today remembered in his alma mater of Trinity College, Oxford, by an annual literature prize, a portrait outside the college library (which hangs below the blade awarded for the 1938 headship), and an annual lecture in his honour (initiated in 1992). Lecturers have included Sebastian Faulks, Beryl Bainbridge (2000), Ian McEwan (2001), Julian Barnes (2002), Graham Swift (2003), Jeanette Winterson (2004), Mark Haddon (2005), Monica Ali (2006), Philip Pullman (2007), Howard Jacobson (2008), Colm Tóibín (2009), Carol Ann Duffy (2010), Tom Stoppard (2011), Andrew Motion (2012), Anne Enright (2013), Will Self (2014), Simon Armitage (2015) and David Hare (2016).

== Works ==
- Richard H. Hillary, The Last Enemy ISBN 0-88751-103-1 (1942); German translation: Der letzte Feind (Zürich, 1942); French translation: La dernière victoire (London, 1944); Italian translation: "L'ultimo avversario" (with an essay by Arthur Koestler) (Verona, 1946); Dutch translation: De laatste vijand (1958); Spanish translation: El último enemigo (Barcelona, 2012)
