= RAF Acklington =

Former Royal Air Force station in Northumberland, England

RAF Acklington RAF Southfields RFC Southfields
- Near Acklington, Northumberland in England
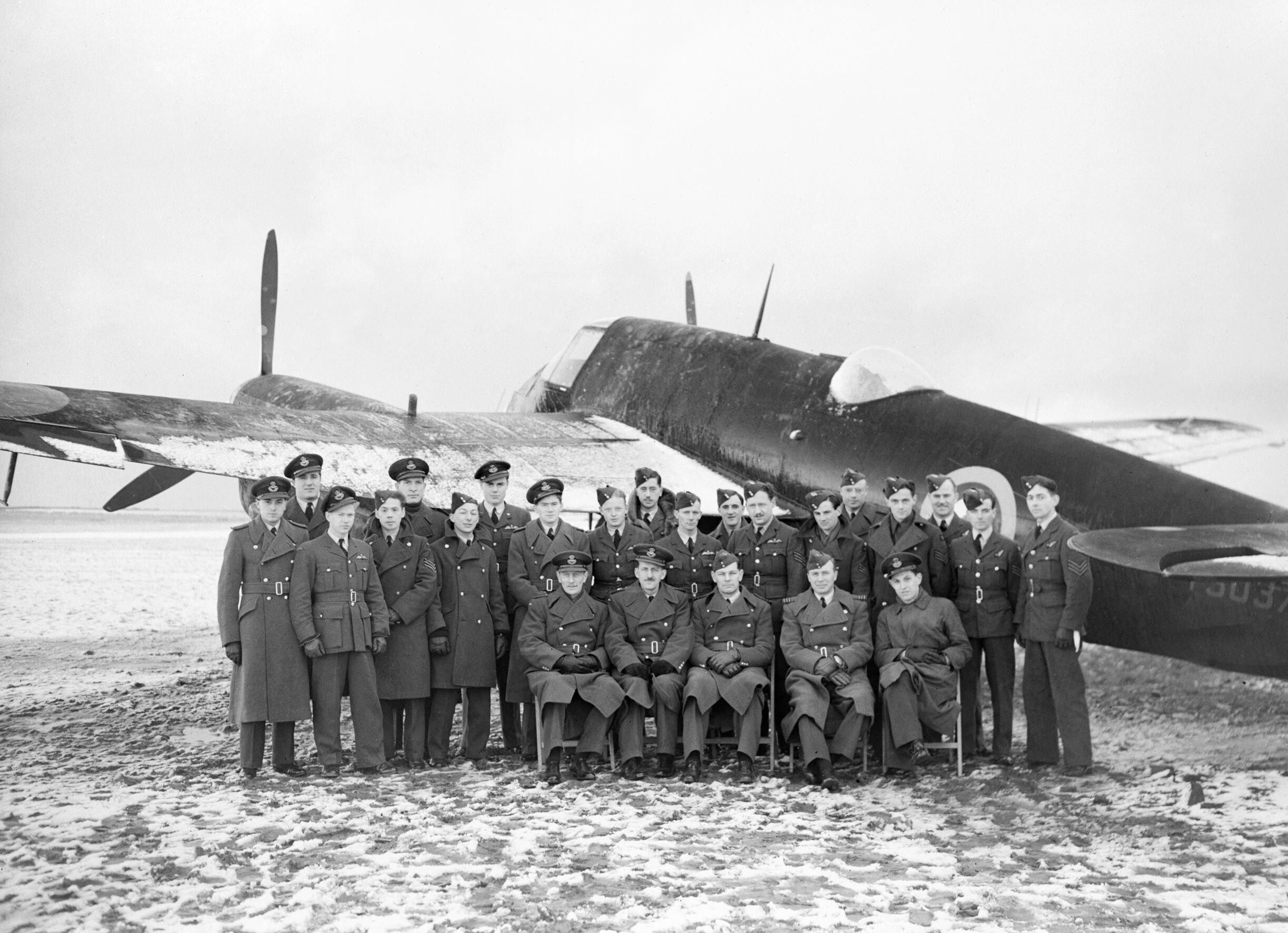
- 'B' flight, No. 409 Sqn RCAF with one of their Bristol Beaufighters in January 1942.

Site information
- Type: Royal Air Force station
- Code: AI
- Owner: Ministry of Defence
- Operator: Royal Flying Corps; Royal Air Force
- Controlled by: RAF Fighter Command * No. 13 Group RAF

Location
- Shown within Northumberland RAF Acklington (the United Kingdom)
- Coordinates: 55°17′46″N 001°38′04″W
- Grid reference: NU230010

Site history
- Built: 1916
- In use: 1916–1920; 1938–1975
- Battles/wars: European theatre of World War II; Cold War

Airfield information
- Elevation: 120 feet (37 m) AMSL
Runways
Direction	Length and surface
01/19	1,390 metres (4,560 ft) Asphalt
05/23	1,740 metres (5,709 ft) Asphalt
12/30	1,100 metres (3,609 ft) Asphalt

Royal Air Force Acklington, simply known as RAF Acklington, is a former Royal Flying Corps and Royal Air Force station located 3.2 miles (5.1 km) southwest of Amble, Northumberland, England and 35 kilometres (22 mi) north of Newcastle upon Tyne.

The airfield was operational initially from 1916 being used by the Royal Flying Corps (RFC) and from April 1918 its successor the Royal Air Force (RAF) before being closed in 1920 however it was reopened in 1938 being used by the RAF until 1972. After 1972 the site was turned over to Her Majesty's Prison Service for the creation of two new prisons.

== History ==
=== First World War ===
Acklington was an aerodrome during the First World War and known as Royal Flying Corps Station Southfields.

=== Second World War ===
The airfield was reopened on Friday 1 April 1938 being renamed to RAF Acklington where No. 7 Armament Training Station was formed which on 15 November 1938 transformed into No. 2 Air Observers School. During September 1939 the school moved to RAF Warmwell and the airfield was handed over to RAF Fighter Command as part of 13 Group where it became a sector airfield.

The following squadrons were at some point posted or attached to RAF Acklington:

- 43 (China-British), 46, 111, 152 (Hyderabad), 245 (Northern Rhodesian), 258, 600 (City of London) Squadron AAF, 607 (County of Durham) Squadron AAF and 609 (West Riding) Squadron AAF.

On 3 February 1940 three Hawker Hurricane fighters from 43 Squadron at Acklington intercepted and shot down a Luftwaffe Heinkel He 111 bomber at Whitby. The formation was led by Flight Lieutenant Peter Townsend. It was the first German aircraft to fall on English soil in the Second World War (although it was not the first to be shot down in the United Kingdom, that having occurred in Scotland). The intercept was based on a plot by operators at RAF Danby Beacon, a radar station about ten miles west of Whitby. Townsend visited the German rear gunner in hospital the next day, and visited him again in 1968 when Townsend was writing his highly-successful book about the Battle of Britain, "Duel of Eagles," which recounts the incident in detail.

On 21 October 1942 well known test pilot Gerry Sayer departed from RAF Acklington in a Hawker Typhoon to test a gunsight during gun firing into Druridge Bay Ranges, and was accompanied by another Typhoon. Neither aircraft returned and it was assumed that they collided over the bay. Sayer was replaced as Gloster's chief test pilot by his deputy, Michael Daunt.

==== Battle of Britain ====
RAF Acklington was home to the following squadrons during the Battle of Britain:

- 72 Squadron between 6 June 1940 and 31 August 1940 with the Supermarine Spitfire Mk I before moving to RAF Biggin Hill.
- 79 (Madras Presidency) Squadron between 13 July 1940 and 27 August 1940 with the Hawker Hurricane Mk I before moving to RAF Biggin Hill.
- 32 Squadron between 28 August 1940 and 15 December 1940 with the Hurricane Mk I before moving to RAF Middle Wallop.
- 610 (County of Chester) Squadron AAF between 31 August 1940 and 15 December 1940 with the Spitfire I before moving to RAF Westhampnett.

==== October 1940–1945 ====
The following squadrons were at some point posted or attached to RAF Acklington:

- 1, 25, 43 (China-British), 56, 63, 74, 130 (Punjab), 141, 164 (Argentine–British), 167 (Gold Coast), 198, 219 (Mysore), 222 (Natal), 263 (Fellowship of the Bellows), 266 (Rhodesia), 278, 288, 289, 291, 309, 315, 316, 317, 322 (Dutch), 349 (Belgian), 350 (Belgian), 406 RCAF, 409 RCAF, 410 RCAF, 504 (County of Nottingham) Squadron AAF, 539 and 609 (West Riding) Squadron AAF.

Other units active at the station during this period included:

- No. 1460 (Fighter) Flight RAF (December 1941 – September 1942)
- 416th Night Fighter Squadron, United States Army Air Forces, 11 June – 4 August 1943

=== Postwar use ===
The following squadron were at some point posted or attached to RAF Acklington:

- 18, 19 with Mustangs, 23, 25, 29 with Meteors & Javelins, 41, 54, 56, 64, 65, 66, 92 with Hunters, 74, 85, 91, 130, 140, 202, 219 with Mosquitoes, 228, 247, 257, 263 with Meteors, 264, 266 and 275.

== Airfield units ==
The following units were at some point posted or attached to RAF Southfields/Acklington:

- Armament Practice Station, Acklington RAF was here between 1 May 1946 and 27 July 1956
- No. 1 Fighter Command Servicing Unit RAF
- No. 3 Aircraft Delivery Flight RAF (November 1943)
- A detachment from No. 3 Tactical Exercise Unit RAF (May 1944 – June 1944)
- No. 4 Aircraft Delivery Flight RAF (November 1943 – March 1944)
- No. 6 Flying Training School RAF with Provost and Jet Provosts (July 1961 – June 1968)
- No. 13 Group Target Towing Flight RAF became No. 1490 (Target Towing) Flight RAF (December 1941 – May 1942)
- No. 24 (Base Defence) Wing RAF (February 1944 – March 1944)
- No. 59 Operational Training Unit RAF (February 1945 – June 1945)
- No. 147 Airfield Headquarters RAF (February 1944 – May 1944)
- No. 1630 (Anti-Aircraft Co-operation) Flight RAF (June 1943 – December 1943)
- Fighter Armament Trials Unit RAF (November 1946 – July 1956)
- No. 2718 Squadron RAF Regiment
- No. 2738 Squadron RAF Regiment
- No. 2741 Squadron RAF Regiment
- No. 2765 Squadron RAF Regiment
- No. 2799 Squadron RAF Regiment
- No. 2800 Squadron RAF Regiment
- No. 2803 Squadron RAF Regiment
- No. 2820 Squadron RAF Regiment

== Current use ==
RAF Acklington closed in 1975 and the main camp became the site of Acklington and Castington prisons. These have since been amalgamated and transferred into private ownership and are simply known as H. M. P. Northumberland. The airfield is virtually unrecognisable today having been subjected to open cast coal mining.

== See also ==
- List of former Royal Air Force stations
