= The Last Enemy (autobiography) =

Book by Richard Hillary

- First edition
- Author: Richard Hillary
- Language: English
- Genre: War memoir
- Publisher: Macmillan
- Publication date: 1942, reprinted April 1998
- Media type: Paperback
- Pages: 178
- ISBN: 1-58080-056-4
- OCLC: 38073310
- Dewey Decimal: 940.54/4941 21
- LC Class: D786 .H5 1997

The Last Enemy (first published in America as Falling Through Space), is a war memoir written by the Second World War Anglo-Australian fighter pilot Richard Hillary detailing his experiences during the Battle of Britain in 1940.

== Background ==
Hillary joined the Royal Air Force at the start of the Second World War as a university undergraduate. Its text details his experiences as a Spitfire pilot during the Battle of Britain, during which he was shot down in action, sustaining severe injuries.

He wrote the book in New York City whilst still recuperating from his wounds during a propaganda publicity tour in the United States in 1941 organized by the British Government to attempt to raise support for the Allied cause and the U.S.A.'s entry into the war. However, he was not allowed to appear in public personally, owing to concerns that his severely facially scarred appearance might prove counter-productive, and his work was confined to newspaper interviews and radio broadcasts.

Hillary was killed aged 23 whilst piloting an aircraft in a training accident in 1943.

== Publication history ==
The book was first published in 1942 under the US title Falling Through Space, with a cover showing an airman plummeting through the sky. For the British publication the title was amended to The Last Enemy, taken from (I Corinthians 15:26, "The last enemy that shall be destroyed is death". A Dutch translation was published in 1958 under the title De laatste vijand.

== Other media ==
A television dramatization of the book was produced in 1956.

== Reception ==
Hillary's biographer, Denis Richards, writes that the book and its author met with instant acclaim, although the book was unusual in the depth of its storytelling:

The author was acclaimed not only as a natural writer, but also as a representative of the doomed youth of his generation, although in his constant self-analysis he was in fact a most untypical British fighter pilot of 1940.

In the preface for the book's first edition in 1942 J. B. Priestley wrote: "The Last Enemy differs from all other books about the R.A.F. because its author, Richard Hillary, is by temperament and inclination, and to some extent training, a writer. ... The value of this book lies in the fact that it is a statement of a fully articulate young man about life in a Service which is generally inarticulate. Richard Hillary happens to be a kind of young man who doesn't often find his way into the R.A.F. He is in my view a born writer."
